= Women's football in Turkey =

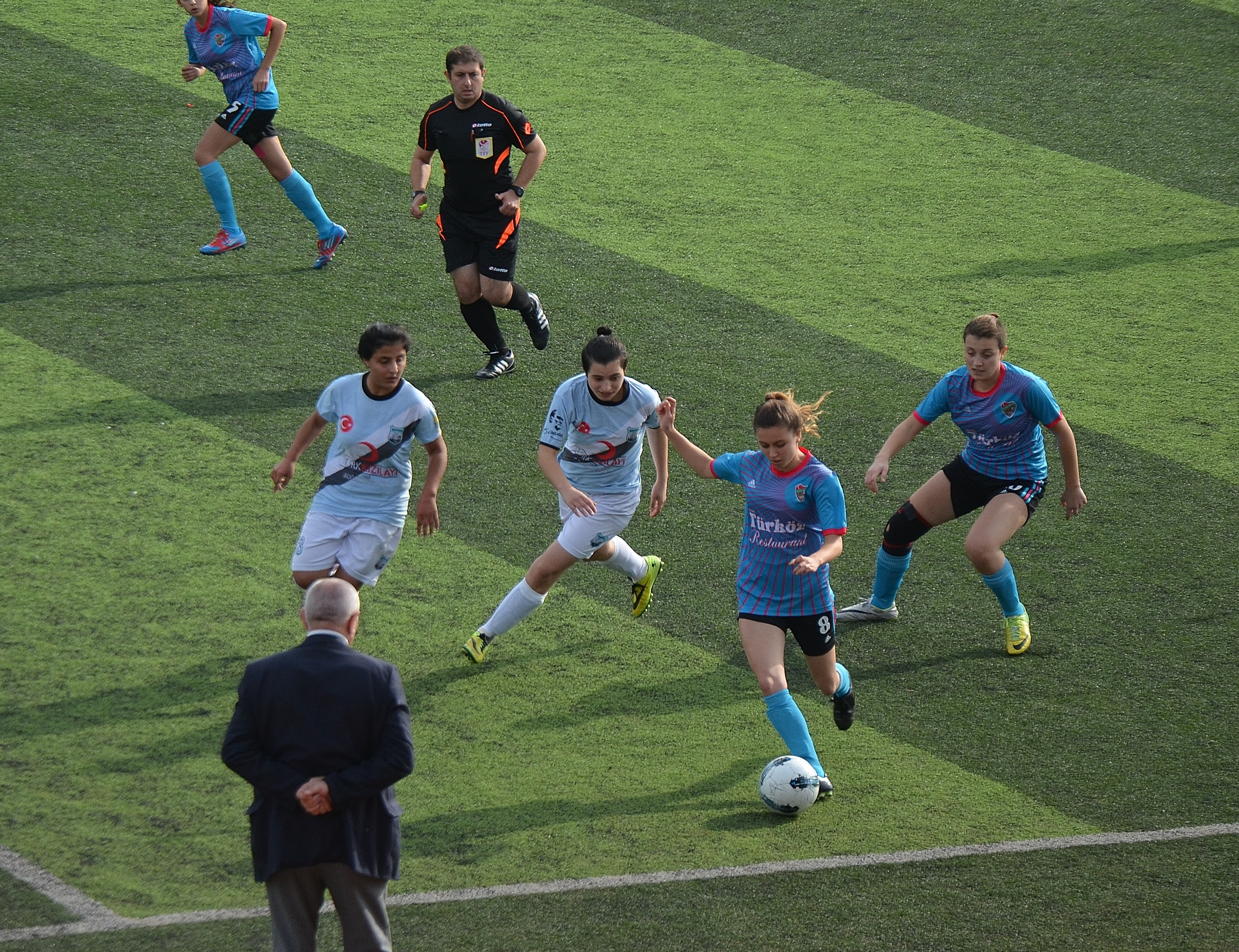
- Turkish Women's Football Third League match during the 2015–16 season.
- Country: Turkey
- Governing body: Turkish Football Federation
- National team: Women's national team

International competitions
- Champions League; FIFA Women's World Cup (National Team); European Championship (National Team)

Women's football in Turkey is the women's branch of football in Turkey and is governed by the Turkish Football Federation (TFF).

== History ==
=== Friendship matches ===
Although Turkey is one of the first countries to adapt women's rights, its practical realization in every part of the society took time. Due to differentiation in the society between men's and women's sports, Turkish women fell behind men in sports. The slogan "football is a men's sport" caused that women were not interested in football in the early days. This incorrect assessment and approach hindered that the number of participants in women's football, like women audience, women footballers, women coaches, women managers and women referees, did not reach the desired level.

The first recorded involvement of women in football took place when six women played in a mixed-gender match in İzmir on 24 May 1954. The first ever football match of only women was played between the İzmir Women's Football team and Istanbul Women's Football team at Mithatpaşa Stadium in Istanbul, today Vodafone Park, on 4 July 1954. During a sports festival on 10 July 1955, one more football match was played between women's teams. There is no indication of women's football event between 1955 and 1969. On 22 August 1969, the first international women's football game in Turkey was played between Italy Girls' and the Joint-Europe Girls' teams at Mithatpaşa Stadium. The match ended with a draw of 1–1 while the Turkish player Afitap scored the only goal of the Joint-Europe team. In 1969, Kınalıada Sports Club in Istanbul formed a girls' football team, which played miniature football in the gym. The team later continued their activities competing against boys' football teams.

In 1971, Haluk Hekimoğlu formed a women's team named "Istanbul Kız Futbol Takımı" (Istanbul Girls' Football Team) with 13 young women on his own personal efforts. This team pioneered the foundation of the country's first women's football club Dostluk Spor (Turkish for "Friendship"), which was officially registered as an association on 19 April 1973 at Moda neighborhood of Kadıköy district in Istanbul. Due to lack of any other women's football teams, Dostluk Spor played demonstration games with men's teams of retired or junior players before some jubilee matches, derbies and season's opening games between 1973 and 1978. The team contributed much to the women's football in Turkey playing in many cities of the country. Their fundraising matches after the 1976 Çaldıran–Muradiye earthquake in Van, eastern Turkey helped growing of social responsibility in the society. The team's advertisement in the newspapers to recruit women players found positive response.

Dostluk Spor's success led soon to the establishment of other women's football teams such as Filizspor in İzmir formed in 1978 by the female students of the Namık Kemal High School, and İncirlispor, Nazende Spor in Ankara the same year. A friendly match played between Filizspor and Dostluk Spor at İzmir Alsancak Stadium ended with the Dostluk Spor's victory of 14–0. Foundation of women's teams in Kocaeli and Samsun followed later. In 1979, Dostluk Spor played a friendly match with the German team SC 07 Bad Neuenahr losing 0–4. This was Dostluk Spor team's first ever international match, and also the first ever international women's football match at clubs' level played in Turkey. On 17 August 1980, Dostluk Spor met Filizspor from İzmir again at Vefa Stadium, Istanbul. An outpoint like in the first match in 1978 was not possible this time, the team from İzmir was defeated only by 2–1. With the foundation of Atılımspor and Deryaspor in 1980, the number of women's football teams in Istanbul reached three.

=== Establishment of leagues ===
With the formation of Dinarsu Women's Football Team in 1982, women's football in Turkey rose to higher levels. Finally, the Turkish Football Federation (TFF) decided at its board meeting on 22 December 1993, to officially establish a league for women's football. Later on, the TFF published the format and the rules for the Turkish Women's Football League. On 1 March 1994, the schedule of the league matches was determined for a total of 16 teams in four groups to meet each other in turn. The beginning of the first women's league season was planned for 20 March 1994. However, the start was postponed to 2–3 April due to the 1994 local elections held on 27 March.

Ten years later, there were ten teams active, and the Women's League was dissolved. According to Adnan Ersan, deputy secretary general of the TFF, the league based on a wrong system. The clubs paid barely attention to the provision of experience and training for young players. They did not look ahead for the future, and deployed players older than twenty years of age. Moreover, the women's national team played no matches from Mai 2000 on. A great many of factors, which sent women's football in Turkey into offside.

In 2006, the Turkish Women's League was re-established with seven teams, and the Turkish women participated again at international competitions. In the meantime, the government supported the development. The Turkish Ministry of National Education coined a concept in cooperation with the Football Federation that envisaged the establishment of girls' football teams in primary and secondary schools. The women's football in Turkey revived, however the national team was composed of young players of amateur-level experience only. National teams of girls' U-17 and U-15 were established in order to feed the women's national team. Young women's footballers in Germany with Turkish-background were seen as a fill-in to strengthen the national team qualitatively, and were called up.

In order to contribute to the development of women's football, the Board of Directors of the Turkish Football Federation decided on 27 October 2021 to establish the Türkcell Women's Super Football League as the top-flight of the Turkish women's football league system beginning in the 2021–22 season. The 2021–22 Türkcell Women's Football Super League consisted of 24 teams.

In the 2022–23 season, the number of leagues increased to four.

Development of women's football in Turkey
Season	No. of clubs	No. of players
2005–06	7	130
2006–07	15	316
2007–08	39	591
2008–09	51	798
2009–10	54	1,080
2010–11	72	1,500

The number of women's clubs was seven with 130 licensed footballers in the 2005–06 season. As of the 2010–11 season, there were 72 clubs with 1,500 players.

== Pyramid ==
Level	League(s)/division(s)			
1	Women's Süper Lig (16 clubs)			
2	Women's 1. Lig; Group A (9 clubs)		Women's 1. Lig; Group B (8 clubs)	
3	Women's 2. Lig; Group A (8 clubs)	Women's 2. Lig; Group B (7 clubs)	Women's 2. Lig; Group C (8 clubs)	Women's 2. Lig; Group D (8 clubs)
4	Women's 3. Lig (74 clubs across 16 groups)			

== Competitions ==
Until the 2021–22 season, the following competition categories existed for women's football:

=== Women's football leagues ===
Number of clubs by league and season
(max. 3 leagues between 2006 – 2022)

2006–07	_{15} / 15
2007–08	_{25} / 25
2008–09	_{10} / _{19} / _{22} / 51
2009–10	_{10} / _{10} / _{23} / 43
2010–11	_{12} / _{10} / 22
2011–12	_{12} / _{35} / 47
2012–13	_{10} / _{50} / 60
2013–14	_{8} / _{69} / 77
2014–15	_{10} / _{12} / _{57} / 79
2015–16	_{10} / _{12} / _{82} / 104
2016–17	_{10} / _{14} / _{103} / 127
2017–18	_{10} / _{16} / _{98} / 124
2018–19	_{10} / _{15} / _{85} / 110
2019–20	_{12} / _{13} / _{79} / 104
2020–21	_{16} / 16
2021–22	_{24} / _{26} / _{85} / 135

Total: 1139

Women's Regional League (2009–2011); Women's Third League (2022–2023); Total (45)

Women's Third League (2014–2020, 2021–2022, 22–23); Women's Second League (2022–2023); Total (589)

Women's Second League (2008–2020, 2021–2022); Women's First League (022-2023); Total (301)

Women's League (1993–2008); Women's First League (2008–2020); Women's League (2020–2021); Women's Super League (2021–2023); Total (204)

Source: Data from the archive of the Turkish Football Federation

From the 2022–23 season on, the women's league system was extended to four leagues.

Number of clubs by league and season
(4 leagues from the 2022– 23 season on)

2022–23	_{19} / _{13} / _{20} / _{91} / 143
2023–24	_{16} / _{17} / _{31} / _{74} / 138
2024–25	_{14} / _{17} / _{36} / _{151} / 218
2025–26	_{16} / _{17} / _{30} / _{169} / 232

Total: 731

Women's Third League (2022–23) - present Total (485)

Women's Second League (2022–23) - present Total (117)

Women's First League (2022-23) - present Total (64)

Women's Super League (2022–23) - present Total (65)

Source: Data from the archive of the Turkish Football Federation

==== Top level league ====
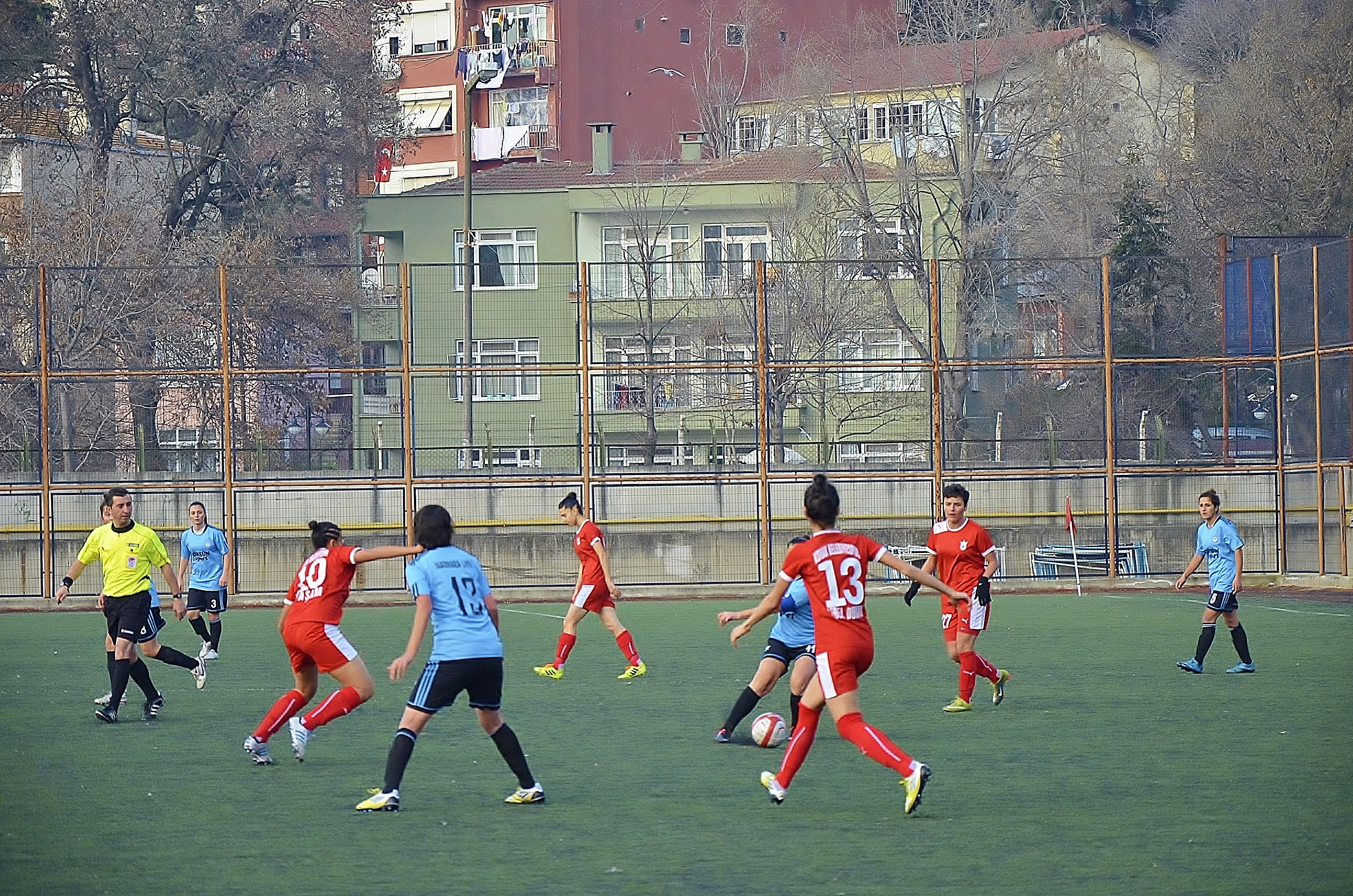
Marmara Üniversitesi Spor (blue/black) vs Konak Belediyespor (red) at the 2013–14 Turkish Women's First League

===== Women's Football League (1993–2003, 2006–2008) =====
The Women's First League (Turkish: Kadınlar 1. Ligi) is the top national competition for women's football in Turkey. The league was established in 1993 starting with the 1993–94 season. The 2000–01 season was apparently the first official competition. Three consecutive seasons between 2003 and 2005 were not played.

===== Women's Football First League (2008–2020) =====
The number of clubs competing in the First League varied from season to season, and dropped from ten in the 2012–13 season to eight in the 2013–14 season. The last standing clubs are relegated to the lower Second League. The number of clubs competing in the First League increased from 10 to 12 in the 2019–20 First League season.

===== Women's Football League (2020–21) =====
With the sponsorship of the mobile phone operator Türkcell, the league was named 2020–21 Turkcell Women's Football League as other sub-level leagues were not played dure to the pandemic. The number of clubs increased from 12 to 16 with promoting of four clubs from the 2019–20 Women's Second League to the existing 12 clubs.

===== Women's Football Super League (2021– ) =====
By October 2021, the Turkish Football federation (TFF) established the Türkish Women's Football Super League (Turkish: Türkish Kadın Futbol Süper Lig), which is called Turkcell Women's Football Super League for sponsorship reasons. Eight clubs of the Süper Lig founded women's football teams and joined the newly established league, which consists of 24 clubs. The 2021–22 Turkcell Women's Football Super League is played in two groups of 12 teams. The first standing four teams compete in the play-offs, and the last standing four teams of each group will in the play-outs. Four unsuccessful team relegate to the second-level league.

The following teams played once in the top-level league:

Club	Hometown
Altay S.K.	İzmir
Amasya Eğitim Spor	Amasya
Antalya Yenikapıspor	Antalya
Beden Eğitimispor	
Bucaspor	İzmir
Bursa Sağlıkgücü Gençlikspor	Bursa
Çamlıcaspor	Istanbul
Derince Belediyespor	Kocaeli
Dinarsuspor	Istanbul
Dostluk Spor	Istanbul
Dudullu Spor	Istanbul
Elitspor	İzmir
Eskişehirspor	Eskişehir
Eskişehir Lisesi Spor	Eskişehir
Gazi Üniversitesispor	Ankara
Gazikentspor	Gaziantep
Gölcükspor	Kocaeli
Hatay Dumlupınarspor	Hatay
Hatayspor	Hatay
İlkadım Belediyesi	Samsun
İzmit Çenesuyu Plajyoluspor	Kocaeli
İzmit Belediyespor	Kocaeli
Karşıyaka BESEM Spor	İzmir
Kartalspor	Istanbul
Kayseri Kadın FK	Kayseri
Kireçburnu Spor	Istanbul
Kocaeli Bayan F.K.	Kocaeli
Lüleburgaz 39 Spor	Kırklareli
Malatya Gençlikspor	Malatya
Maltepe Yalıspor	Istanbul
Marmara Üniversitesi Spor	Istanbul
Marshall Boyaspor	Istanbul
Mersin Camspor	Mersin
Mersin Gençlerbirliği	Mersin
Mersingücü Cengiz Topelspor	Mersin
Sakarya Yenikent Güneşspor	Sakarya
Sivasspor	Sivas
Soyaspor Gençlik	Ordu
Zeytinburnuspor	Istanbul

Champions

League champion team represents Turkey at the UEFA Women's Champions League.

Season	Club	City	No. of clubs
1994	Dinarsuspor	Istanbul	20
1994–95	Dinarsuspor (2)	Istanbul	20
1995–96	Dinarsuspor (3)	Istanbul	28
1996–97	Dinarsuspor (4)	Istanbul	19
1997–98	Zara Ekinlispor	Istanbul	19
1998–99	Marshall Boyaspor	Istanbul	14
1999-00	Delta Mobilyaspor	Istanbul	11
2000–01	Kuzeyspor	Istanbul	12
2001–02	Zeytinburnuspor	Istanbul	
2002–03	Samsungücü	Samsun	10
2003–04	no league played		
2004–05	no league played		
2005–06	no league played		
2006–07	Gazi Üniversitesispor	Ankara	15
2007–08	Gazi Üniversitesispor (2)	Ankara	15
2008–09	Trabzonspor	Trabzon	10
2009–10	Gazi Üniversitesispor (3)	Ankara	10
2010–11	Ataşehir Belediyespor	Istanbul	12
2011–12	Ataşehir Belediyespor (2)	Istanbul	12
2012–13	Konak Belediyespor	İzmir	10
2013–14	Konak Belediyespor (2)	İzmir	8
2014–15	Konak Belediyespor (3)	İzmir	10
2015–16	Konak Belediyespor (4)	İzmir	10
2016–17	Konak Belediyespor (5)	İzmir	10
2017–18	Ataşehir Belediyespor (3)	Istanbul	10
2018–19	Beşiktaş J.K.	Istanbul	10
2019–20	ALG Spor	Gaziantep	12
2020–21	Beşiktaş J.K. (2)	Istanbul	16
2021–22	ALG Spor	Gaziantep	24
2022–23	Ankara BB Fomget GSK	Ankara	19
2023–24	Galatasaray	Istanbul	16
2024–25	Ankara BB Fomget GSK (2)	Ankara	14
2025–26			16

Notes:

- ^{1}) declared league first by the Turkish Football Federation after the season discontinued due to the outbreak of the COVID-19 pandemic in Turkey.

==== Second level league ====
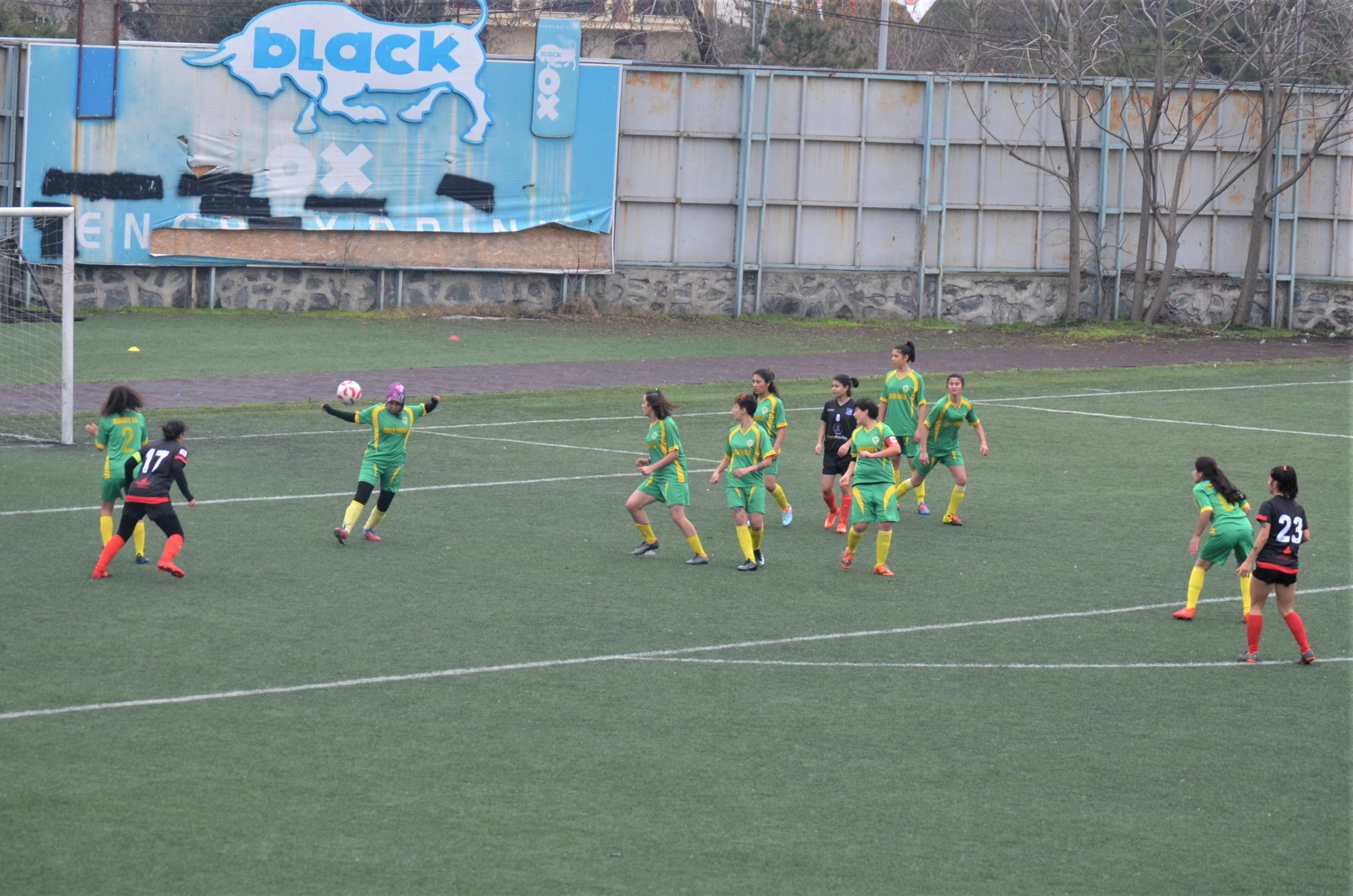
Turkish Women's Second League match between Akdeniz Nurçelik Spor (black/red) and Osmaniye Kadın Spor (green/yellow) in the 2018–19 season.

===== Women's Football Second League (2008–2020) =====
The Women's Second League (Turkish: Kadınlar 2. Ligi) is the regional organization for all the clubs, which do not take part in the Women's First League. At the end of each league season, last placed teams of the First League are relegated to the Second League. The top standing teams of the Second League are promoted to the First League. Since there exist no lower-level league than the Second League, no relegation takes place from this league.

In the 2013–14 season, a total of 69 teams competed in eight divisions as following: With the 2015–16 season, the number of teams competing in the Second League was set to twelve. In the 2020–21 season no second league was played due to COVID-19 pandemic in Turkey.

===== Women's Football First League (2022– ) =====
In the 2022–23 season, the TFF extended the league system to four leagues. The former Women's Football Second League became Women's Football First league. ın the 2022–23 Turkish Women's Football First League, 14 teams, four relegated teams of the Super League, and ten teams of the former Second League after relegation of 16 teams to the third level league, will compete in two groups.

==== Third level league ====
===== Women's Football Regional League (2008–2010) =====
The Turkish Women's Football Regional League (Turkish: Kadın Futbolu Bölgesel Ligi) existed two seasons between 2009 and 2011. 22 to 23 teams competed in four groups. Four seasons after its establishment, the Women's Third League was established in the 2014–15 season.

===== Women's Football Third League (2014–2020, 2021–2022) =====
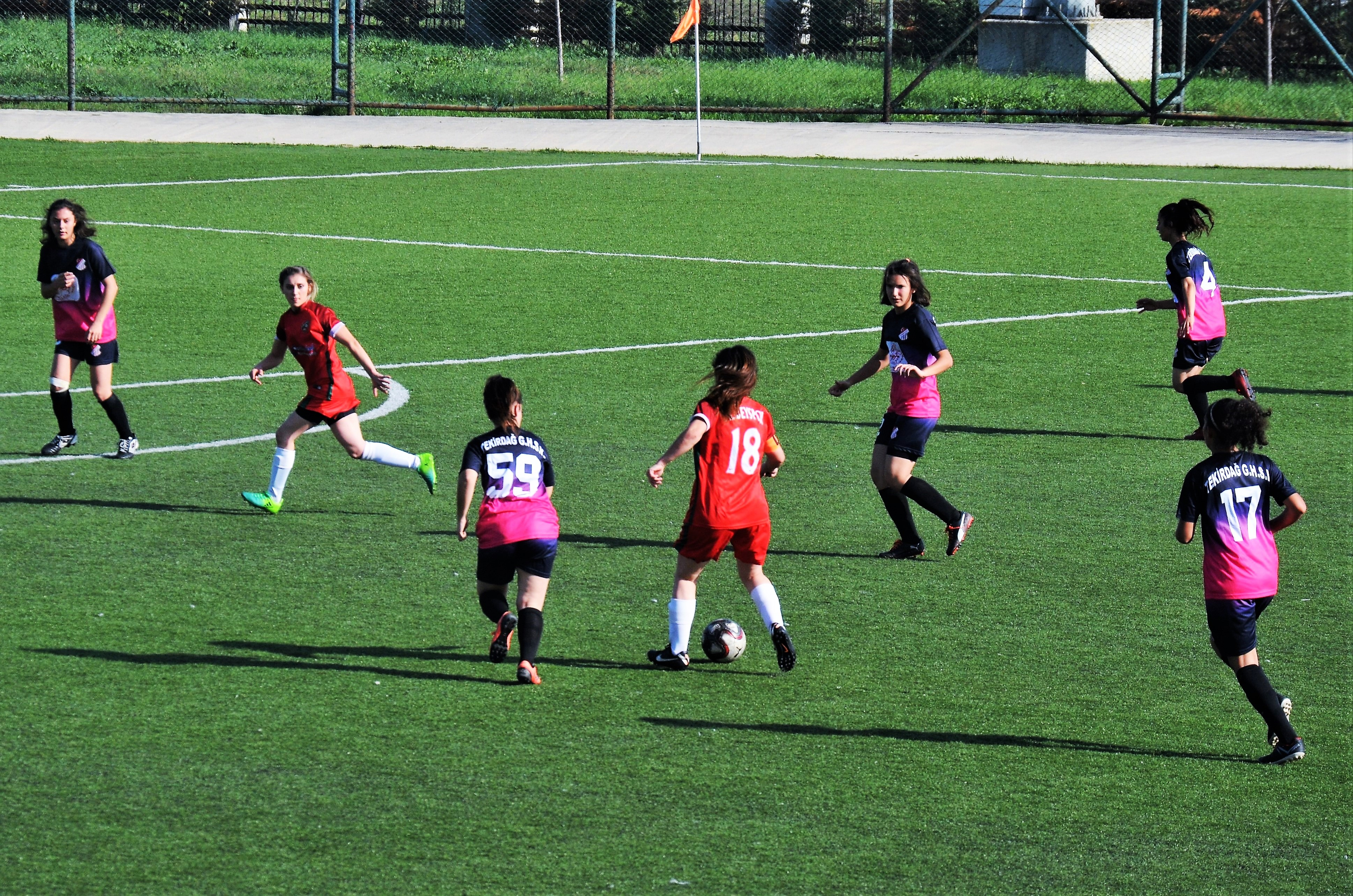
Silivri Alibey Spor (red) vs Tekirdağ G.H.S.K. (navy/purple) in the 2019–20 season match of the Turkish Women's Third League.

The Turkish Women's Third Football League was a regional league and is composed of fifteen groups with five to six teams each, making a total of 85 women's teams.

===== Women's Football Second League (2022– ) =====
In the 2022–23 season, the former Women's Third Football League was renamed Women's Football Second League. The league consists of 20 teams in three groups with 16 teams relegated from the former Second League and 8 teams promoted from the former Third League. Four of the teams did not register. The group matches started on 12 March and will end on 3 June.

==== Fourth level league ====
===== Women's Football Third League (2022– ) =====
In the 2022–23 season, the former Women's Football Third League will be played with the former Third League teams. A total of 91 teams in 20 groups will compete between 18 March and 19 April.

=== Girls' football championships ===
As of the 2022–23 season, the TFF made compulsory that the Women's Super League clubs hold a juniors or youth team to play in any girls' championship.

A junior or youth team of a club, which has no team playing in any league, may be promoted up to a league when they meet the status criteria of league teams.

==== Girls' U-17 Turkey Championship ====
For the girls of age group 15–17, the Girls' U-17 Turkey Championship (Turkish: U17 Kızlar Türkiye Şampiyonası) is being held. It is an important organization in respect of the development of women's football in Turkey.

The first leg of the 2009 Girls' U-17 Turkey Championship (Turkish: Genç Kızlar Türkiye Şampiyonası) was held between 9–12 July 2009 with the participation of 36 clubs in six groups across Turkey each having six teams. The top first teams of the six groups were entitled to play the finals. The finals were held between 23–25 July 2009 in Bartın. Mevlana Lisesi from Ümraniye, Istanbul became champion of the 2008–09 season defeating İzmir Konak Belediyespor by 1–0 in the final match.

The Girls' U-17 Turkey Championship developed rapidly in the following years so that the number of participating teams increased from 27 in 2008 to 110 in 2018.

The TFF announced by August 2019 in its 2019–20 season's competition status that the Girls' U-17 Championship was abolished. The decision was sharply criticized by some women's football club managers. It was claimed that girl footballers of age group 15–16 will be forced to play in the senior team of their club with the disadvantage of appearing against older and much experienced opponents.

Development of Girls' U-17 Turkey Championship
Year	No. of Groups	No. of Teams	Ref.
2008	7	27	
2009	6	36	
2010	7	43	
2012	8	35	
2013	13	55	
2014	16	73	
2015	20	105	
2016	29	129	
2017	25	114	
2018	32	110	
2020	Abolished		

==== Girls' U-15 Regional Championship ====
The Girls' U-15 Regional Championship (Turkish: U15 Kızlar Bölgesel Şampiyonası) is organized for the girls' teams in the age category 13–14.

It was held in the 2008–09 season between 18–20 July 2009 with the participation of six teams in two groups. The leaders of the two groups, Kocaeli Gölcükspor and Bursa Sağlıkgücüspor, played the finals in Düzce. Gölcükspor became champion by winning 3–0.

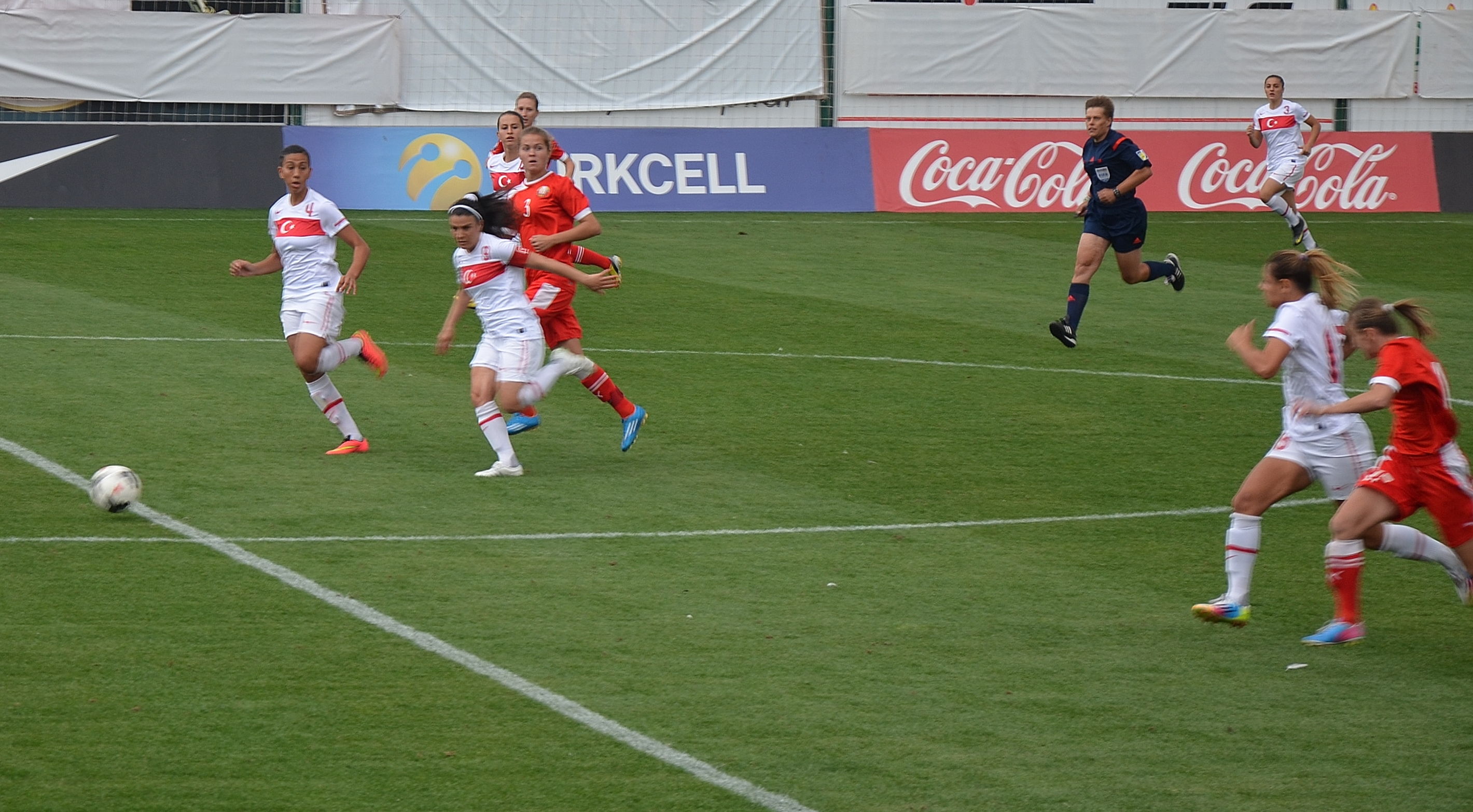
2015 FIFA Women's World Cup qualification match of Turkey women's (white) vs Belarus women's (red)

Horozkentspor (Denizli) won the 2016 championship title. Kocaeli Harb-İş became runner-up and Konak Belediyespor (İzmir) placed third.

==== Girls' U-13 Local Championships ====
The Girls' U-13 Local Championships Turkish: U13 Kızlar Yerel Şampiyonaları) are held in provinces, where at least four teams participate. The teams consists of a goalkeeper, seven players and five substitutes.

=== Eligibility criteria ===
Taking the extension of the women's football league system in the 2022–23 season into account, the TFF set new eligibility criteria for players and coaches.

==== Player eligibility criteria ====
Player eligibility
Criterion	Super League	First League	Second League	Third League	U-17 Turkey Champ.	U-15 Reg. Champ.	U-13 Local Champ.
Age	min. 14	min. 14	min. 14	min. 14	15–16	13–14	11–12
Foreigner	max. 8	max. 3	No	No	No	No	No

==== Coach eligibility criterion ====
Coach eligibility
Criterion	Super League	First League	Second League	Third League	Junior & Youth Cahmps
Licence level	min. UEFA A	min. UEFA A	min. TFF Grassroots C	min. TFF Grassroots C	min TFF Grassroots C

=== Player transfer fees ===
In case of the transfer of a player, a fee is paid to the former club as follows:

Player transfer fees (2022–23)
Player	Age 18–24	Age 25–29	Age 30+
Non-national	₺22,500	₺15,000	No
National	₺60,000	₺37,500	No

== National teams ==
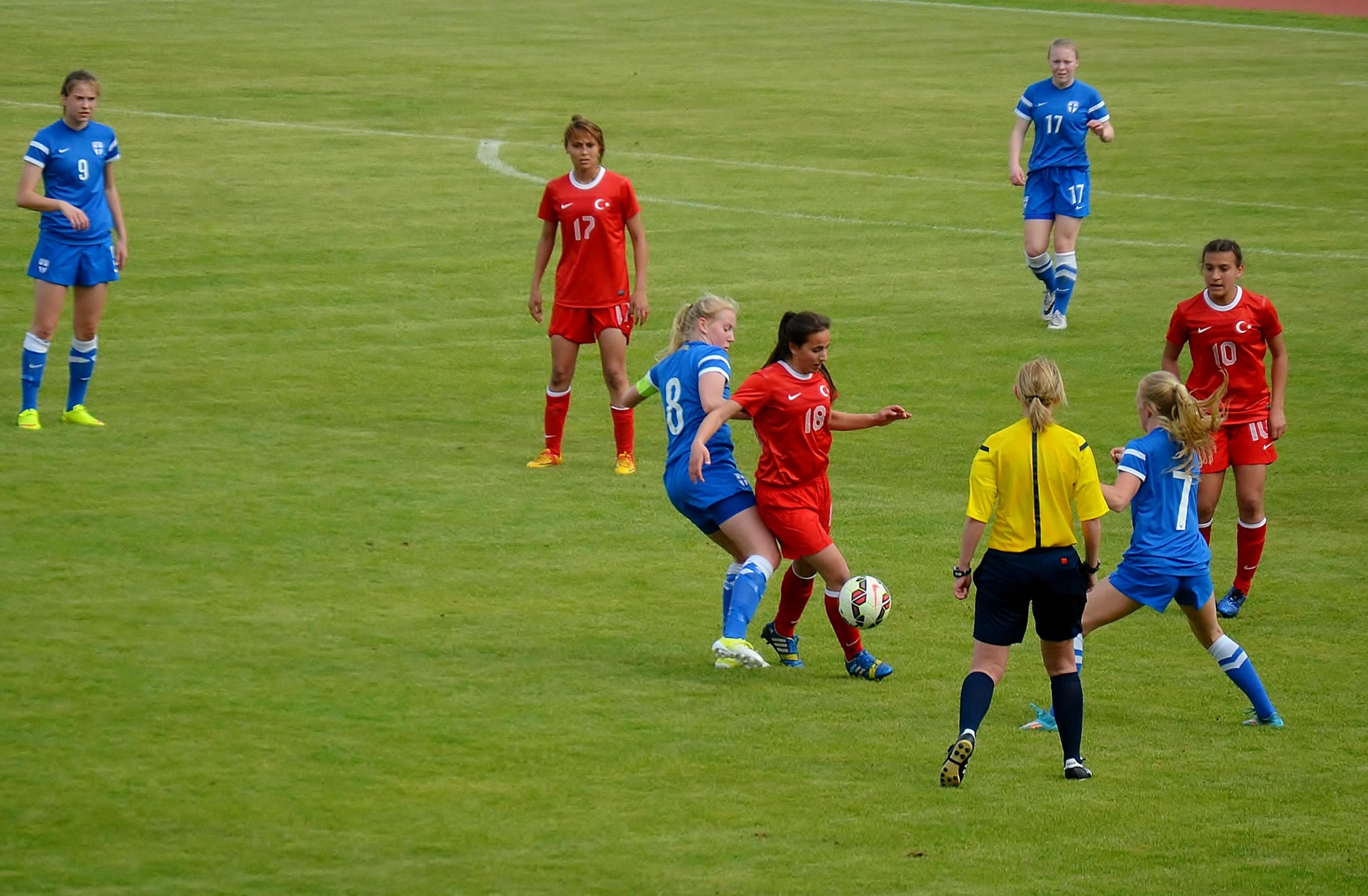
2015 UEFA Championship Second qualifying round – Group 1 match Turkey girls' U-17 (red) vs Finland girls' U-17 (blue)

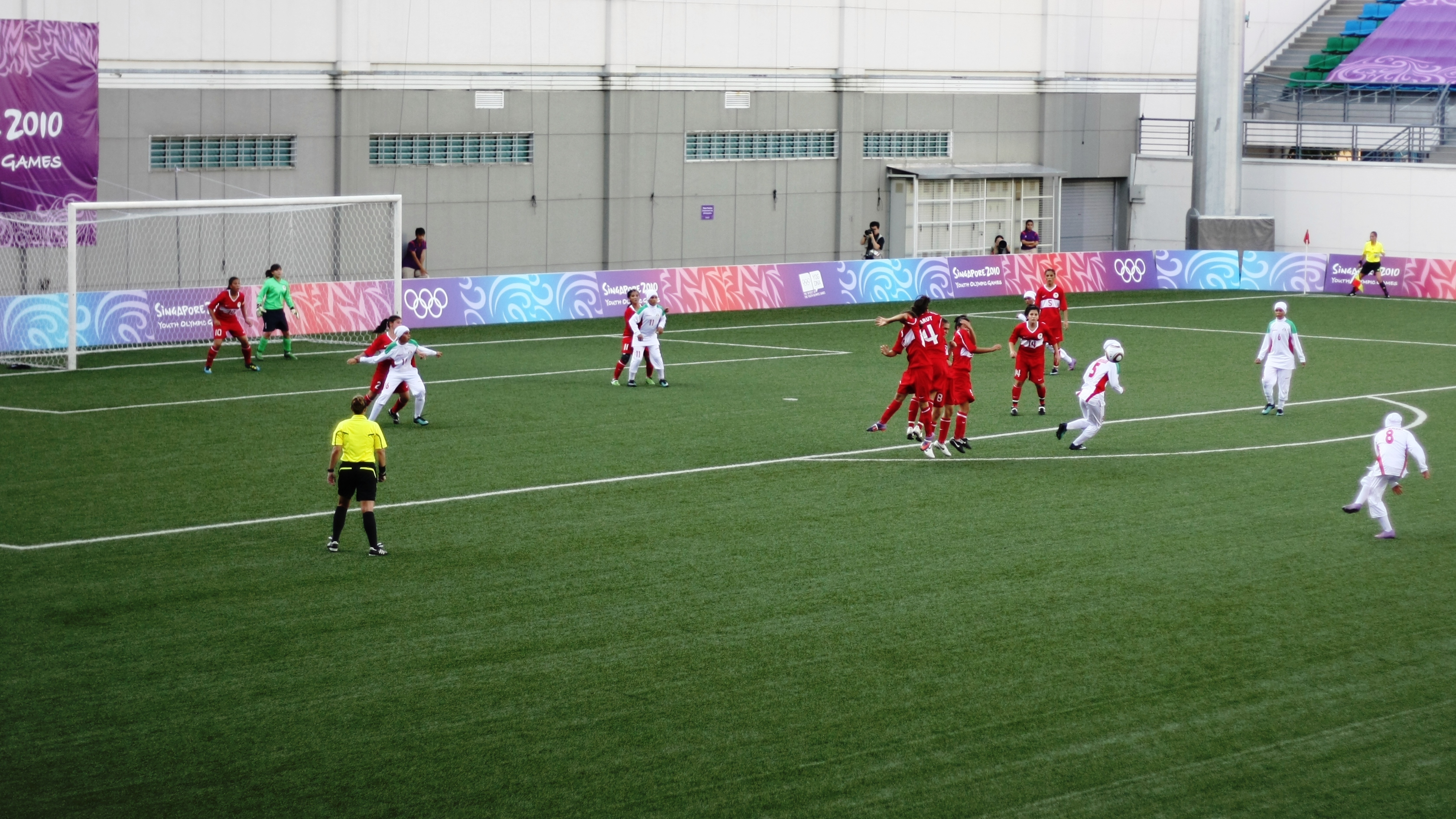
Turkey (red) vs Iran (white) at the 2010 Youth Olympics in Singapore

Women's football in Turkey is represented in international competitions by:

- Turkey women's national football team (Kadınlar A Milli Futbol Takımı),
- Turkey women's national under-19 football team (Genç Kadınlar U-19 Milli Futbol Takımı) and
- Turkey women's national under-17 football team (Yıldız Kızlar U-17 Milli Futbol Takımı).

A 2013-FIFA report stated that Turkey makes serious efforts to develop a strong women's national team at senior level by using foreign resources. Turkish-descent female players from diverse nations, including Australia, Belgium, Canada, Germany, Netherlands, Sweden and the US, are called up to international events. The idea behind is the hope that the experience of these players will help improve the standards, and give the youngsters at home a boost.

== UEFA Women's Champions League ==
By virtue of winning 2008–09 Turkey National Women's First League, Trabzonspor played in August 2009 in the Group D for qualification to the 2009–10 UEFA Women's Champions League. This was the first time ever a Turkish women's football team participated in the play-offs for the UEFA league established in the 2001–2002 season. The team won its first match against ŽNK Krka from Slovenia by 2–0, however lost the following plays to Torres Calcio Femminile of Italy by 0–9 and to Slovan Duslo Šaľa from Slovakia by 1–2. Trabzonspor women's team failed so to participate in the 2009–2010 UEFA Champions League.

In the following years, Gazi Üniversitesispor in 2010–11, Ataşehir Belediyespor, twice in 2011–12 and 2012–13, and Konak Belediyespor, also twice in 2013–14 and 2014–15, played in the UEFA Women's Champions League. In the 2013–14 season, Konak Belediyespor became the first ever Turkish women's team to play in the league's Round of 16 knockout phase.

UEFA Women's Champions League As of 25 May 2024
Season	Team	Pld	W	D	L	GF	GA	GD	Round
2009–10	Trabzonspor	3	1	0	2	3	11	−8	Qualifying Round
2010–11	Gazi Üniversitesispor	3	0	1	2	3	22	−19	Qualifying Round
2011–12	Ataşehir Belediyespor (1)	3	0	1	2	3	9	−6	Qualifying Round
2012–13	Ataşehir Belediyespor (2)	3	1	0	2	5	10	−5	Qualifying Round
2013–14	Konak Belediyespor (1)	7	4	1	2	7	8	−1	Round of 16
2014–15	Konak Belediyespor (2)	3	2	0	1	13	5	+8	Qualifying Round
2015–16	Konak Belediyespor (3)	3	1	0	2	7	14	−7	Qualifying Round
2016–17	Konak Belediyespor (4)	3	1	0	2	7	8	−1	Qualifying Round
2017–18	Konak Belediyespor (5)	3	2	0	1	11	4	+7	Qualifying Round
2018–19	Ataşehir Belediyespor (3)	3	1	1	1	10	10	0	Qualifying Round
2019–20	Beşiktaş	3	1	2	0	6	3	+3	Qualifying Round
2020–21	ALG Spor	1	0	1	0	3	3	0	First Qualifying Round
2021–22	Beşiktaş (2)	2	1	0	1	4	7	−3	First Qualifying Round
2022–23	ALG Spor (2)	1	0	0	1	0	1	−1	First Qualifying Round
2023–24	Fomget Gençlik	2	1	0	1	7	2	+5	First Qualifying Round

Overall Table As of 25 May 2024
Part	Team	Pld	W	D	L	GF	GA	GD	P	Best Achievements
5	Konak Belediyespor	19	10	1	8	45	39	+6	31	Round of 16
3	Ataşehir Belediyespor	9	2	2	5	18	29	−11	8	Qualifying Round
2	Beşiktaş	5	2	2	1	10	10	0	8	Qualifying Round
2	ALG Spor	2	0	1	1	3	4	−1	1	First Qualifying Round
1	Trabzonspor	3	1	0	2	3	11	−8	3	Qualifying Round
1	Gazi Üniversitesispor	3	0	1	2	3	22	−19	1	Qualifying Round
1	Fomget Gençlik	2	1	0	1	7	2	+5	3	Qualifying Round
14	Toplam	43	16	7	20	89	117	−28	55	Son 16

== Women coaches ==
Former notable women coaches are:

- Fatma Yağmur Aydın
- Zerrin Bakır (born 1981)
- Aysun Boyacı (born 1972)
- Tülin Dedeman
- Emine Nurten Doğruyol
- Özgür Gözüaçık
- Huriye Aslı Ertunç (born 1973)
- Fatma Gültekin
- İlknur İdil
- Handan Kasapoğlu (born 1982)
- Çiğdem Kayhan (born 1967)
- Nurper Özbar
- Zeynep Özcan
- Leyla Öztürk
- Meryem Özyumşak (born 1972)
- Ana Rosca (born 1974)
- Zeliha Şimşek (born 1981)
- Ayfer Topluoğlu (born 1977)
- Lalezar Veliyeva
- Asiye Veral
- Çilem Yaşar (born 1975)
- Emine Yılmaz (born (born 2000)

Current women coaches are:

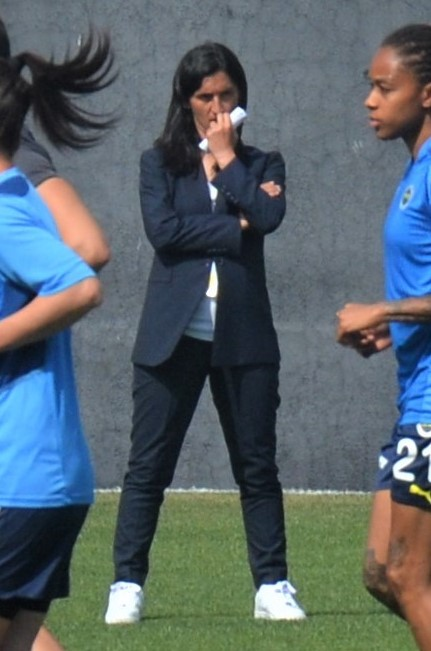
Nihan Su, coach of Fenerbahçe women's in the 2021-22 Turkish Women's Football Super League on 28 May 2022

- Necla Akdoğan (born 1971)
- Özlem Araç (born 1989)
- Nurcan Çelik (born 1980)
- Hatice Bahar Özgüvenç (born 1984)
- Aslı Canan Sabırlı (born 1991)
- Nihan Su (born 1981)
- Cemile Timur (born 1988)

== Women referees ==
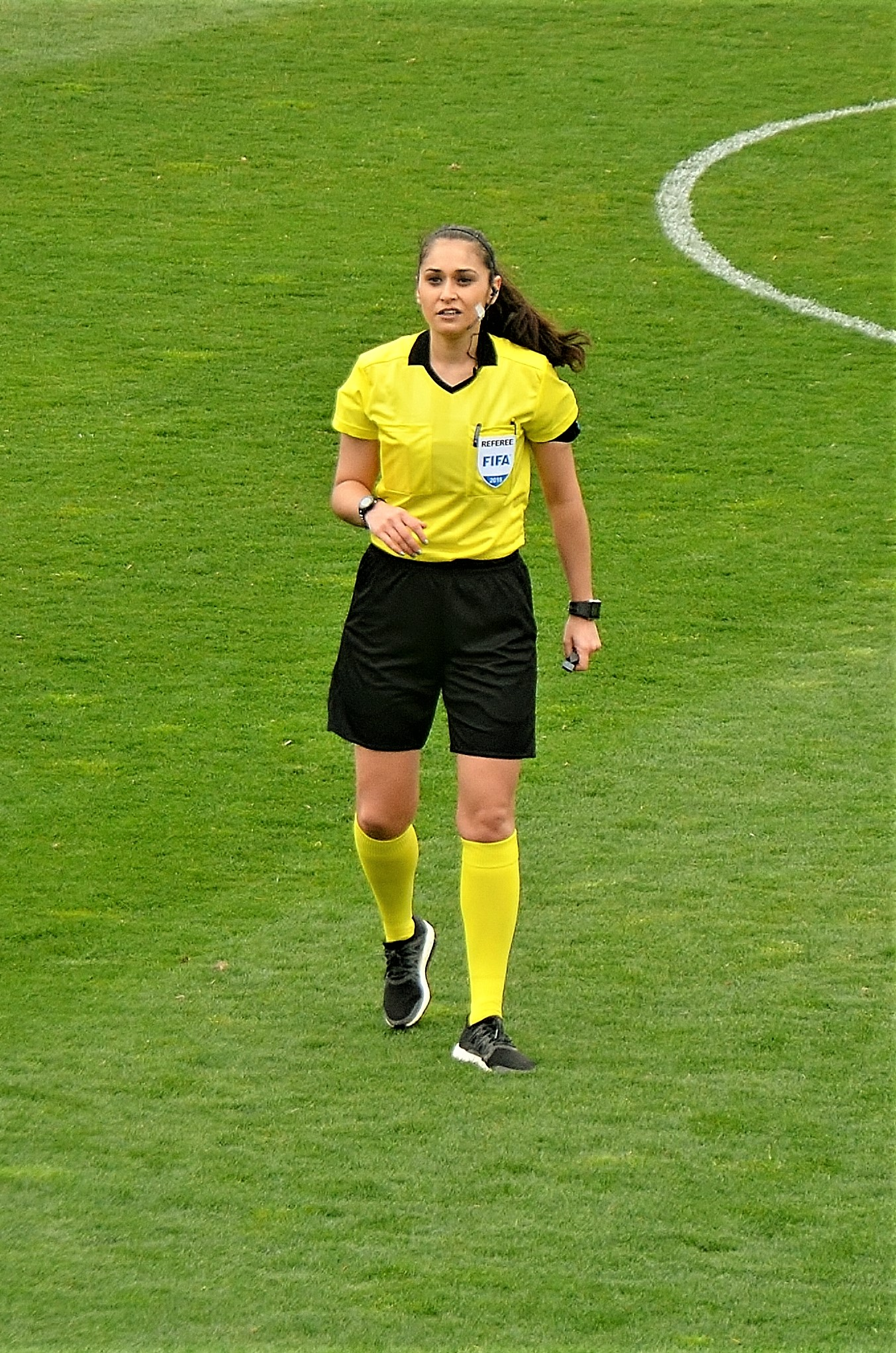
Neslihan Muratdağı officating the friendly match Turkey women's vs Estonia at TFF Riva Facility on 7 April 2018

- Necla Akdoğan (born 1971)
- Drahşan Arda (born 1945)
- Leman Bozacıoğlu
- İpek Emiroğlu (born 1992)
- Dilan Deniz Gökçek (born 1976)
- Kadriye Gökçek
- Özge Kanbay (1996–2019)
- Dilek Koçbay (born 1982)
- Sibel Kolçak (born 1990)
- Neslihan Muratdağı (born 1988)
- Lale Orta (born 1960)
- Melis Özçiğdem (born 1982)
- Cemile Timur (born 1988)
- Cansu Tiryaki
- Yeliz Topaloğlu (born 1978)
- Hilal Tuba Tosun Ayer (born 1970)
- Fatma Özlem Tursun (born 1988)
- Mürvet Yavuztürk (born 1985)
- Betül Nur Yılmaz

== See also ==
- Turkish women in sports
- Women's association football around the world
