= Nurcan Çelik =

Turkish footballer (1980–2026)

Personal information
- Date of birth: 1 January 1980
- Place of birth: Artvin, Turkey
- Date of death: 14 February 2026 (aged 46)
- Place of death: Istanbul, Turkey
- Position: Goalkeeper

Youth career
- 1995–1997: Bursaspor

Senior career*
Years	Team	Apps	(Gls)
1997–1999	Bursaspor		
1999	Gemlik Zeytinspor		
2001–2002	Zeytinburnuspor		
2003	Maltepe Yalıspor		
2003–2004	VfL Wolfsburg	0	(0)
2006–2007	Dostluk Spor		
2007–2009	Zeytinburnuspor	27	(1)
2010	Akdeniz Spor Birliği	2	(0)
2011–2020	Akdeniz Nurçelik Spor	49	(3)
2020–2021	Kireçburnu Spor	3	(0)

International career
1997–1998	Turkey U19	3	(0)
1999–2008	Turkey	6	(0)

Managerial career
- 2021–2022: Galatasaray
- * Club domestic league appearances and goals

Nurcan Çelik (1 January 1980 – 14 February 2026) was a Turkish footballer who played as a goalkeeper. She played for the Turkey under-19 national team before she became a member of the Turkey senior national team. She was the founder and president of Akdeniz Nurçelik Spor. After retiring from active playing, she became manager of the newly reestablished women's team of Galatasaray.

== Background ==
Nurcan Çelik was born in a low-income family as the youngest of three children, a son and two daughters, in Artvin, northeastern Turkey on 1 January 1980. Her mother died from breast cancer when Nurcan was four years old. Her father remarried, and the family moved a couple of years later from Artvin to Bursa. Her father died when she was 16 years old. Her elder sister was killed by a gunman. In 2013, her stepmother died also from breast cancer.

== Club career ==
Çelik became interested in football as a young girl. She idolized the Polish striker Roman Kosecki, who played for Galatasaray S.K. in Turkey between 1990 and 1992.

Çelik learned from a cousin that a women's football team was being established in Turkey. At that time, she was able to juggle the ball 500–600 times. She entered the selection trials, and her football career started as a player in Bursaspor in 1995, where she played two seasons in the youth setup. She was a member of Bursaspor until 1999. Her coach wanted her in the goalkeeper position against her will. Even her father was against it. She unwillingly accepted the goalkeeper position. Her father was shocked when he saw her playing as a goalkeeper during a match visit.

She transferred to Gemlik Zeytinspor in Gemlik, Bursa Province. In the second half of the 2000–01 season and joined the Istanbul-based club Zeytinburnuspor. She moved to Maltepe Yalıspor at the beginning of the second half of the 2003–04 season.

In 2003, as the Turkish Football Federation suspended the women's football leagues, players found no chance to continue competition football. The women with an educated profession found employment. Çelik applied to the German club VfL Wolfsburg upon their advertisement on the internet. She signed a six-month contract with the club and obtained a residence permit for six months. The first half season, she took part in training only. After that period, she had to return to Turkey because her residence permit was not extended.

Returning home, she signed for Dostluk Spor, where she stayed for one season. She then returned to her former club Zeytinburnuspor in the 2007–08 season, where she played three seasons until 2010.

In June 2010, she moved to Northern Cyprus, and obtained a license. She played in two matches for Akdeniz Spor Birliği in the KTFF Women's League. However, she had to return home after the final match in July 2010 due to cancellation of her license, which was issued out of the transfer period by way of an exception.

In the 2011–12 season, she played one match for İstanbul Nurçelik Spor. Following a break of one year, she again played for her club, which was renamed Akdeniz Nurçelik Spor in the 2013–14 season. Aside from playing as a goalkeeper, she occasionally played as a midfielder.

For the 2020–21 Turkcell Women's League season, she joined Kireçburnu Spor as a goalkeeper. This was her return to the First League after twelve years.

== International career ==
Çelik was admitted to the Turkey women's national U-19 team, and debuted in the 1998 UEFA Women's Under-18 Championship qualifying round match against Russia on 17 November 1997. Later, she played in two matches of the 1999 UEFA Women's Under-18 Championship qualifying round against Ukraine and Norway in September 1998.

She was nominated to play for the Turkey women's national football team in February 1999. After playing for the first time for the national team in a friendly match against Israel on 3 July 1999, she took part in two matches of the UEFA Women's Euro 2001 qualification round the same year. In 2007 and 2008, Çelik played three matches in the UEFA International Support Tournament.

== Club founder and president ==
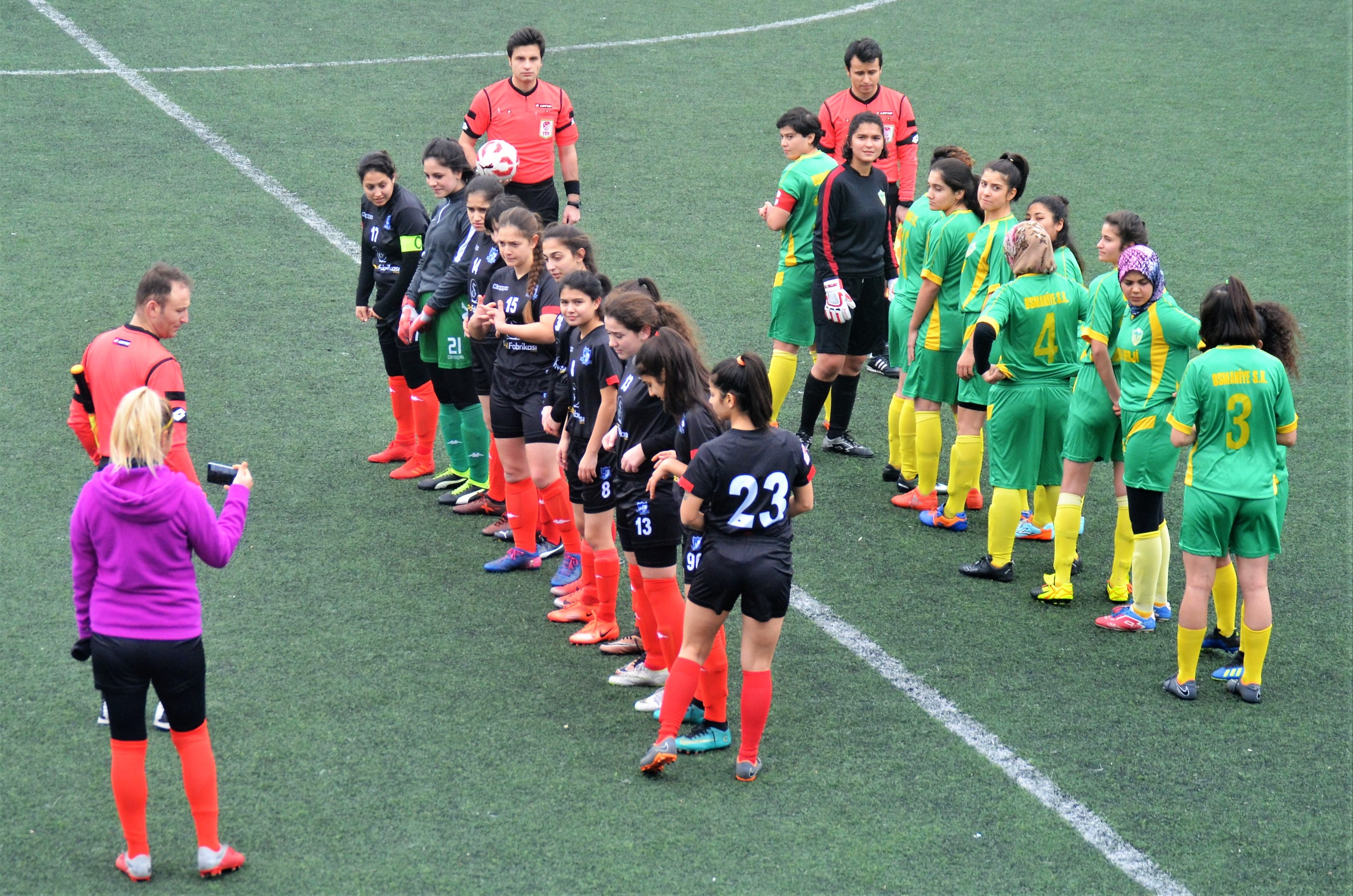
Akdeniz Nurçelik Spor (black/red) vs. Osmaniye Spor (green/yellow) in the 2018–19 Turkish Women's Second Football League match. Nurcan Çelik (left in lilac/black/red) shooting a photograph of her team.

In 2010, she founded her own football club İstanbul Nurçelik Spor in Turkey giving her name to the club. She took over the players of her former club Zeytinburnuspor, which had recently folded. She established a women-only club, and did not open a men's branch for fear that one day a club president may decide to close the women's branch. She intended to bring women footballers from Northern Cyprus to Turkey. However, this became impossible as an international embargo was imposed on the Turkish Republic of Northern Cyprus. Therefore, the two clubs, İstanbul Nurçelik Spor and Akdeniz Spor Birliği, were merged into Akdeniz Nurçelik Spor in the 2013–14 season. Çelik acted as the president of her club.

== Managerial career ==
As of September 2021, Galatasaray Club established a women's football team and appointed Çelik as the coach. In the notification made on 10 August 2022, it was announced that the contract with Çelik, who served as the Technical Director in the 2021–22 season, concluded their tenure with the organization.

== Illness and death ==
In 2008, Çelik was diagnosed with thyroid cancer. After surgery and radiation treatment, she underwent eight months of chemotherapy at her family house in a village in Bursa. In 2010, she was diagnosed with breast cancer that invaded lymph nodes. As a result, one of her breasts was removed, and she underwent chemotherapy for eight months in a hospital in Bursa.

Çelik died on 14 February 2026, at the age of 46. She was buried in her hometown of Artvin.

== Career statistics ==
Appearances and goals by club, season and competition
Club	Season	League			National cup		Continental		Total	
Club	Season	Division	Apps	Goals	Apps	Goals	Apps	Goals	Apps	Goals
Bursaspor	1995–1999				3	0	–		3	
Bursaspor	Total				3	0	0	0	3	
Gemlik Zeytinspor; Zeytinburnuspor; Maltepe Yalıspor; VfL Wolfsburg; Dostluk Spor	1999–2006				3	0	–			
Gemlik Zeytinspor; Zeytinburnuspor; Maltepe Yalıspor; VfL Wolfsburg; Dostluk Spor	Total				3	0	0	0	3	0
Zeytinburnuspor	2007–08	First League	9	0	2	0	–		11	0
Zeytinburnuspor	2008–09	First League	11	0	1	0	–		12	0
Zeytinburnuspor	2009–10	Second League	7	1	0	0	–		7	1
Zeytinburnuspor	Total		27	1	3	0	0	0	30	1
Akdeniz Spor Birliği	2009–10	KTFF Women's League	2	0	0	0	–		2	0
İstanbul Nurçelik Spor	2011–12	Second League	1	0	0	0	–		1	0
Akdeniz Nurçelik Spor	2013–14	Second League	1	0	0	0	–		1	0
Akdeniz Nurçelik Spor	2014–15	Third League	8	3	0	0	–		8	3
Akdeniz Nurçelik Spor	2017–18	Second League	12	0	0	0	–		12	0
Akdeniz Nurçelik Spor	2018–19	Second League	17	0	0	0	–		17	0
Akdeniz Nurçelik Spor	2019–20	Second League	10	0	0	0	–		10	0
Akdeniz Nurçelik Spor	Total		49	3	0	0	0	0	49	3
Kireçburnu Spor	2020–21	First League	3	0	0	0	–		3	0
Career total			81	4	9	0	0	0	90	4

== Managerial statistics ==
Team	From	To	Record				
Team	From	To	G	W	D	L	Win %
Galatasaray S.K.
Galatasaray S.K.	2021	2022	22	8	5	9	36.36
Total			22	8	5	9	36.36
Grand total	2021	2022	22	8	5	9	36.36
