= Reyhan Yüksekoğlu =

Turkish women's footballer

Personal information
- Date of birth: 20 August 1980 (age 46)
- Place of birth: Rize, Turkey
- Position: Midfielder

Senior career*
Years	Team	Apps	(Gls)
1995	Gümüşsuyu Spor		
1997	Gençosman Sitespor		
19997–1999	Zara Ekinlispor		
1999–2000	Marshall Boyaspor		
2001–2002	Zeytinburnuspor	11	(4)
2003	Maltepe Yalıspor	-	(-)
2006–2007	Dostluk Spor		
2007–2008	Zeytinburnuspor		
2008–2009	Maltepe Yalıspor	7	(3)
2009–2011	Düvenciler Lisesispor	35	(20)
2011–2012	Lüleburgaz 39 Spor	7	(2)
Total		60	(29)

International career^{‡}
1998	Turkey U-19	2	(1)
1997–2002	Turkey	29	(2)
- * Club domestic league appearances and goals ‡ National team caps and goals as of 23 May 2002

Reyhan Yüksekoğlu (born 20 August 1980) is a retired Turkish women's footballer, who last played in the Turkish Women's First League in midfielder position for Lüleburgaz 39 Spor with jersey number 8. She was a member of the Turkey girls' national U-19 and women's national teams.

== Club career ==
Yüksekoğlu started her football career at Gümüşsuyu Spor in 1995. Later, in 1997, she was with Gençosman Sitespor. She then played for the Zara Ekinlispor, Marshall Boyaspor, Zeytinburnuspor and Maltepe Yalıspor between 1997-2002. In 2003. No women's leagues competitions were held in Turkey in the years between 2003 and 2006. In 2006, she transferredto Dıostluk Spor. In the following seasons, she was with her former clubs Maltepe Yalıspor and Zeytinburnuspor until 2009. After playing all the time in the Women's First League for Istanbul-based clubs, she moved in the 2009-10 Women's Second League season to the high school team Düvenciler Lisesispor in Kırklareli. The team finished the season as champion, and they were promoted to the Women's First League. The team was renamed to Lüleburgaz 39 Spor in the 2011-12 Women's First League season. She captained her team together with Esra Erol.

On 15 January 2012, she suffered rupture of the cruciate ligament on her left leg. After the surgery, she had to stay away about six months from the football pitch. She ended her active sports career.

== International career ==
Yüksekoğlu played for the Turkey girls' national U-17 team in two matches of the 1999 UEFA Women's Under-18 Championship qualifying round and scored one goal against Ukraine.

She was admitted to the Turkey women's national team, and debuted in the 1999 FIFA Women's World Cup qualification (UEFA) match against Georgie on 25 September 1997. She took part at the UEFA Women's Euro 2001 qualifying and 2003 FIFA Women's World Cup qualification (UEFA). She scored two goals in a total of 29 matches played.

== Honours ==
Turkish Women's Second Football League

Düvenciler Lisesispor
Winners (1): 2009-10.
