= Denmark women's national football team records and statistics =

This article comprises an overview of the Denmark women's national football team records and statistics, from their first official match against Sweden in 1974 to the present day.

== Most appearances ==
As of 9 June 2026

The table below lists the 25 most capped players for Denmark. (Note: Players denoted in bold are still available for selection.)

Rank	Player	Span	Caps	Goals
1	Katrine Pedersen	1994–2013	210	9
2	Sanne Troelsgaard	2008–2025	197	57
3	**Pernille Harder**	2009–present	173	85
4	**Katrine Veje**	2009–present	171	9
5	Johanna Rasmussen	2002–2018	153	41
6	Merete Pedersen	1993–2009	136	65
7	Theresa Eslund	2008–2020	133	5
8	Line Røddik Hansen	2006–2020	132	13
9	Cathrine Paaske-Sørensen	2000–2010	121	36
10	Anne Dot Eggers Nielsen	1993–2007	118	26
11	Nanna Christiansen	2009–2021	112	12
12	Lene Jensen	1996–2010	109	26
13	Nadia Nadim	2009–2025	108	38
14	Mariann Gajhede Knudsen	2003–2015	107	6
15	Lene Terp	1993–2003	105	4
16	Louise Hansen	1995–2007	98	5
16	**Simone Boye**	2011–present	98	5
18	**Frederikke Thøgersen**	2014–present	96	3
19	Janni Arnth	2010–2019	93	2
20	Julie Rydahl Bukh	2001–2013	91	10
21	Gitte Krogh	1994–2001	90	46
22	**Sofie Junge Pedersen**	2011–present	89	7
23	Stina Lykke Petersen	2011–2018	83	0
24	**Stine Ballisager**	2012–present	81	4
25	Heidi Elgaard Johansen	2000–2012	80	0
25	**Stine Sandbech**	2015–present	80	22

== Goalscorers ==
As of 9 June 2026

=== Top goalscorers ===
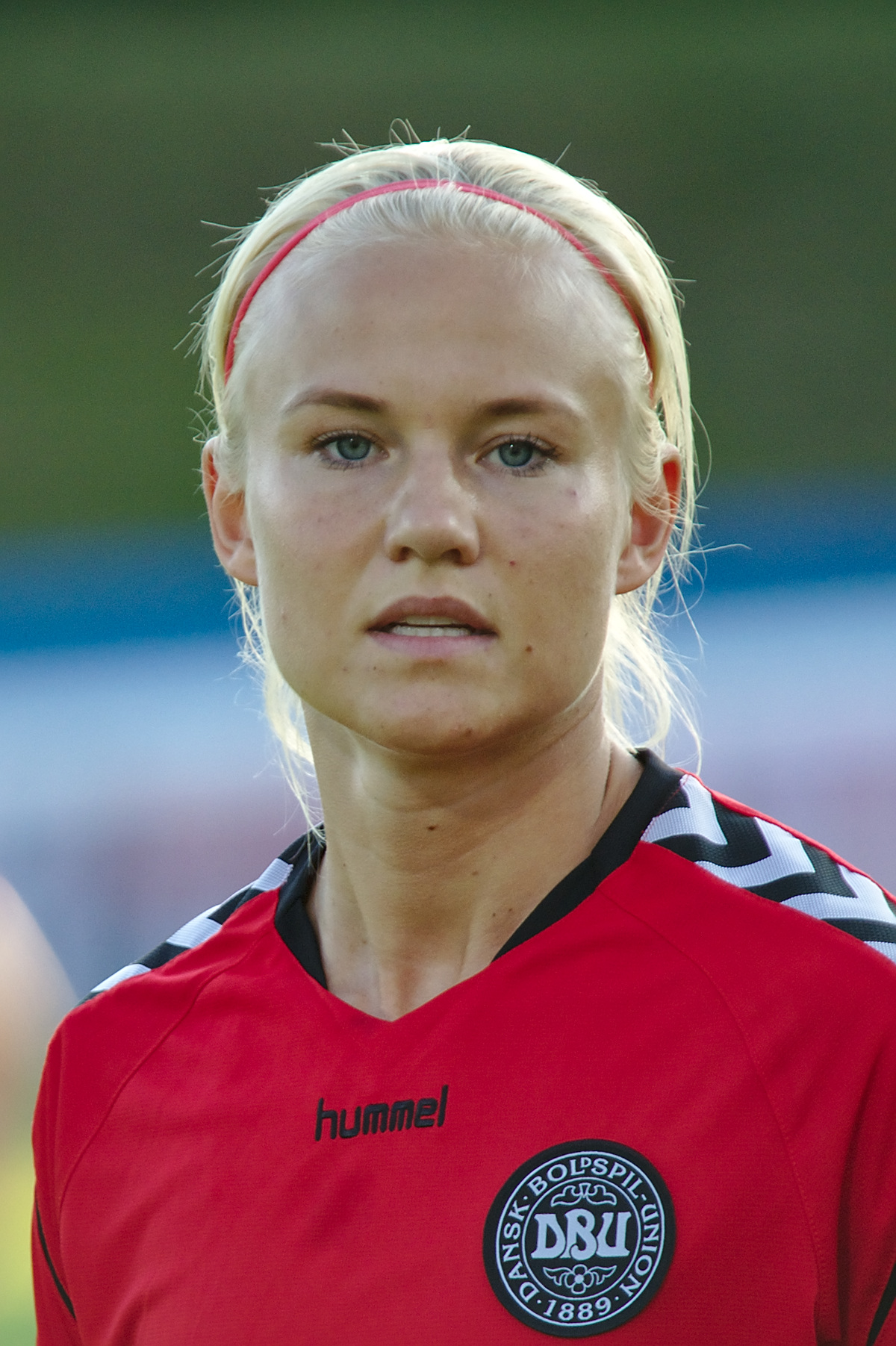
With 85 goals, Pernille Harder is currently the all-time goalscorer in the history of Danish football.

The table below lists players with 10 goals or more for Denmark. (Note: Players denoted in bold are still available for selection.)

#	Player	Career	Goals	Caps	Pct.
1	**Pernille Harder**	2009–present	85	173	0.491
2	Merete Pedersen	1993–2009	65	136	0.478
3	Sanne Troelsgaard	2008–present	57	197	0.289
4	Gitte Krogh	1994–2001	46	90	0.511
5	Johanna Rasmussen	2002–2018	41	153	0.268
6	Helle Jensen	1987–1996	38	77	0.494
6	Nadia Nadim	2009–present	38	108	0.352
8	Cathrine Paaske Sørensen	2000–2010	36	121	0.298
9	Lene Jensen	1996–2010	26	109	0.239
9	Anne Dot Eggers Nielsen	1993–2007	26	118	0.22
11	**Signe Bruun**	2017–present	25	55	0.455
12	Maiken Pape	2006–2010	23	48	0.479
13	Lone Smidt Nielsen	1977–1988	22	57	0.386
13	**Stine Sandbech**	2015–present	22	80	0.275
15	Annie Gam-Pedersen	1982–1991	15	56	0.268
16	**Amalie Vangsgaard**	2022–present	14	47	0.298
17	Annette Thychosen	1988–1994	13	46	0.283
17	Line Røddik Hansen	2006–2020	13	132	0.098
19	Nanna Christiansen	2009–2021	12	112	0.107
20	Inge Hindkjær	1977–1984	11	25	0.44
20	Susanne Niemann	1974–1982	11	31	0.355
20	Janne Rasmussen	1991–1999	11	40	0.275
20	**Janni Thomsen**	2020–present	11	57	0.193
24	Hanne Nissen	1989–1993	10	29	0.345
24	Lene Madsen	1994–1996	10	32	0.313
24	Janni Lund Johansen	1997–2004	10	41	0.244
24	Mette Jokumsen	1999–2005	10	44	0.227
24	Christina B. Petersen	1992–2001	10	70	0.143
24	Julie Rydahl	2001–2013	10	91	0.11

== Team captains ==
As of 27 October 2025

The table below lists the ten players with the most caps as Denmark captains.

Rank	Player	Years	Caps (Total)	Avg.
1	Katrine S. Pedersen	2003–2013	124 (210)	59%
2	Pernille Harder	2016–present	96 (166)	57%
3	Lene Terp	1998–2003	63 (105)	60%
4	Line Røddik Hansen	2013–2016	19 (132)	14.3%
5	Rikke Holm Brink	1996–1998	18 (60)	30%
6	Karina Sefron	1991	14 (71)	19.7%
7	Maren Barsballe	1975–1979	13 (20)	65%
8	Helle Jensen	1995	12 (77)	15.5%
8	Bonny Madsen	1993–1995	12 (70)	17.1%
10	Annette Mogensen	1987–1988	11 (45)	24.4%
