= Ayşe Kuru =

Turkish footballer (born 1974)

Personal information
- Date of birth: January 2, 1974 (age 52)
- Place of birth: Cide, Kastamonu, Turkey
- Position: Defender

Senior career*
Years	Team	Apps	(Gls)
1996–1999	Dinarsuspor		
1999	Zara Ekinlipor		
1999–2001	Marshall Boyaspor		

International career
1995–2001	Turkey	30	(0)
- * Club domestic league appearances and goals

Ayşe Kuru (born 2 January 1974) is a Turkish former women's football defender. She was part of the Turkish women's national team between 1995 and 2001.

== Playing career ==
=== Club ===
Kuru obtained her license for Dinarsuspor on 30 August 1996. She played in the Turkish Women's Football League, and was captain of her team. After Dinarsuspor withdrew from the league, she transferred to Zara Ekinlispor in August 1999, and then moved to Marshall Boyaspor in November the same year.

Kuru became the first ever Turkish women's footballer to play abroad after she moved to Germany to join FCR Duisburg.

=== International ===
Kuru was admitted to the Turkey women's national football team and debuted at the UEFA Women's Euro 1997 qualification - Group 8 match against Bulgaria on 21 October 1995. She played in five matches of the qualification round. She played in seven matches of the 1999 FIFA Women's World Cup qualification - Group 7, in three matches of the 1998 Women's Harvest Cup, in six matches of the UEFA Women's Euro 2001 qualification - Group 8 and in one match of the 2003 FIFA Women's World Cup qualification - Group 8. She capped 30 times in total for the women's national team.
