= Yalıspor =

Yalıspor may refer to:

- Trabzon Yalıspor, a sport club in Trabzon, Turkey
- Maltepe Yalıspor, a sport club in Maltepe district of Istanbul, Turkey
