= Ayfer =

Ayfer is a Turkish given name for females. People named Ayfer include:

- Ayfer Topluoğlu (born 1977), Turkish footballer and manager
- Ayfer Tunç (born 1964), Turkish writer
- Ayfer Yılmaz (born 1956), Turkish civil servant, politician and former government minister
