= Bulut =

Bulut is a Turkish given name for men and a surname (meaning "cloud") and may refer to:

== Surname ==
- Dušan Domović Bulut, Serbian basketball player
- Erol Bulut, Turkish-German football player
- Erol Bulut (1955–2021), Turkish painter
- Gamze Bulut (born 1992), Turkish athlete
- Kerem Bulut, Turkish-Australian football player
- Nazan Bulut (born 1973), Turkish women's football player and teacher
- Onur Bulut (born 1994), Turkish football player
- Samet Bulut (born 1996), Dutch football player
- Umut Bulut (born 1983), Turkish football player
- Yiğit Bulut (1972–2025), Turkish journalist and political advisor
