= Feride Akgün =

Turkish footballer (born 1973)

Personal information
- Date of birth: August 24, 1972 (age 54)
- Place of birth: Nazımiye, Tunceli, Turkey
- Position: Forward

Senior career*
Years	Team	Apps	(Gls)
1992–1997	Dinarsuspor		
1997–2001	Marshall Boyaspor		

International career^{‡}
1995–2002	Turkey	29	(2)
- * Club domestic league appearances and goals ‡ National team caps and goals as of 23 May 2002

Feride Akgün (born 24 August 1972) is a Turkish former footballer, who played as forward in the Turkish Women's League for various clubs, and the Turkey women's national team. She was named the league's top goalscorer three times.

== Early years ==
Akgün professionally played volleyball at Galatasaray. She then switched over to football.

== Club career ==
Akgün played for the Istanbul-based Turkish Women's League clubs Dinarsuspor (1992-1997) and Marshall Boyaspor (1997–2001). She enjoyed four league champion and one Federation Cup champion titles. During her time at Dinarsuspor, she became the most goalscorer with 54 goals. She was named three times top goalscorer.

In 2001, she went to Germany, and played trials with FCR 2001 Duisburg and the B-team of FC Bayern Munich.

== International career ==
Akgğn was a member of the Turkey national team between 1995 and 2002, capping 29 matches and scoring one goal. She played at the UEFA Euro 1997 qualifying, 1999 FIFA World Cup qualification, UEFA Euro 2001 qualifying, and 2003 FIFA World Cup qualification matches.

== Later years ==
In 2016, "İstanbul Akademi Futbol Okulları" (Istanbul Academy Football Schools), an institution for football infrastructure, added Akgün to their staff.
