= Dinarsuspor =

Former women's football club in Istanbul

- Founded: 1991; 34 years ago
- Dissolved: 1997
- League: Turkish Women's League
- 1994 1994–95 1995–96 1996–97: champion champion champion champion

Dinarsuspor was a women's football club based in Istanbul, Turkey.

Dinarsuspor was founded in 1991 by six women's footballers, who left Dostluk Spor. The team was the women's football side of the same-named club, which was established in 1982 by the carpeting and artificial turf producer Dinarsu. With the establishment of the Turkish Women's Football League by the Turkish Football Federation (TFF) in 1994, the team started to play regular matches. The team became champion already in the first ever league season in 1994. The team repeated their success in a row in the following three seasons also. The team won the Federation Cup in 1997 as well.

Dinarsuspor took part at international tournaments. They became champion of the Schwäbisch Hall Tournament in Germany in 1996. They placed in the 1997 Stuttgart-tockach Tournament, at which 42 teams participated from Austria, Switzerland, Poland and Germany. The team won 26 of the 39 international matches and scored 108 goals in total.

In 1997, club president İlker İnat decided to withdraw from the league after his demand on assignment of a stadium and referees for a friendly match with a women's team from Romania was not met by the TFF although nine players of the team were members of the national team.

== Notable players ==
Players, who were member of the Turkey women's national team:

- Feride Akgün
- Aysun Boyacı
- Nazan Bulut
- Bilgin Defterli
- Melahat Eryurt
- Seyhan Gündüz
- Meral Halıcı
- Ayşe Kuru
- Yasemin Metin
- Alev Paçal
- İlknur Şenol
- Ayfer Topluoğlu

== Honours ==
Turkish Women's Football League

- Winners (4): 1994, 1994–95, 1995–96, 1996–97

Turkish Women's Federation Cup

- Winners (1): 1996-97
