= Zerrin Bakır =

Turkish footballer and coach (b. 1981)

Personal information
- Date of birth: 27 June 1981 (age 45)
- Place of birth: Çanakkale, Turkey

Senior career*
Years	Team	Apps	(Gls)
1998-1999	Çanakkale Belediyespor		
1999-2000	Gemlik Zeytinspor		
2000-2001	Kuzeyspor		
2001-2002	Maltepe Yalıspor		
2008-2009	Marmara Üniversitesispor		
2009-2010	Kartalspor		
2010-2011	Marmara Üniversitesispor		
Total		31	(10)

International career^{‡}
1999	Turkey U-19	5	(0)
1999-2002	Turkey	16	(2)

Managerial career
- 2014-2016: Esenler Öz Yavuzselim Spor
- * Club domestic league appearances and goals ‡ National team caps and goals as of 5 April 2002

Zerrin Bakır (born 27 June 1981) is a Turkish football coach, and former football player in the top Turkish women's football leagues. She was a member of the Turkey women's national U-19 and A teams.

== Private life ==
Zerrin Bakır was born in Çamakkale on 27 June 1981.

== Club career ==
Bakır started her football career at her hometown club Çanakkale Belediyespor (1998-1999). She then played for Gemlik Zeytinspor (1999-2000), Kuzeyspor (2000-2001), and Maltepe Yalıspor (2001-2002) in the Women's League, Marmara Üniversitesispor (208-2009) in the Women's Second League as well as Kartalspor (2009-2010) and again Marmara Üniversitesispor (2010-2011) in the Women's First League. She scored ten goals in a total of 31 league matches.

== International career ==
In 1999, she became member of the Turkey girls' U-19 team, and appeared in two matches of the 2000 UEFA Women's Under-19 Championship qualifying First round and in three matches of the Second round.

She was admitted to the Turkey women's national team and debuted in the friendly match against Israel on 1 July 1999. She played at three matches of the UEFA Women's Euro 2001 qualifying and six matches of the 2003 FIFA Women's World Cup qualification (UEFA). She scored two goals in a total of 16 international matches.

== Manager career ==
Bakır started a manager career after obtaining a UEFA A Coaching Licence. In 2014, she was appointed head coach of the newly established girls football club Öz Yavuzselimspor in Esenler district of Istanbul. ın 2015, Her team competed in the Turkish Girls' U-15 Regional Championship's Group Istanbul. The team took part in the Girls' U-17 Turkey Championship in 2016.
