= UEFA Women's Euro 2001 qualifying =

Qualifying stage of football tournament

The qualification for the UEFA Women's Euro 2001 was held between 21 August 1999 & 28 November 2000. The first-placed of the group stage qualified directly. The second-placed and the third-placed teams played in two playoff matches for four other berths.

== CLASS A ==
=== Group 1 ===
Team	Pts	Pld	W	D	L	GF	GA
France	14	6	4	2	0	10	5
Sweden	11	6	3	2	1	18	7
Spain	4	6	1	1	4	6	17
Netherlands	3	6	0	3	3	5	10

29 September 1999
19:00

Sweden	2–2	France
Nordlund 29'; Ljungberg 90'	Report (in French); FFF Report (in French); SvFF Report (in Swedish)	Jézéquel 30', 47'

Gammliavallen, Umeå
Attendance: 7,511
Referee: Christine Frai (Germany)

30 October 1999
19:30

Netherlands	1–1	France
van Eyk 75'	Report (in French); FFF Report (in French); KNVB Report (in Dutch)	Diacre 53'

Jan Louwers Stadion, Eindhoven
Attendance: 5,000
Referee: Ovedie Bente Skogvang (Norway)

7 November 1999
13:00

Spain	2–5	Sweden
Mateos; Rodríguez	SvFF Report (in Swedish)	Andersson; Ljungberg; Svensson

Estadio Municipal de Plasencia, Plasencia
Attendance: 3,000
Referee: Claudine Brohet (Belgium)

27 November 1999
19:00

France	1–0	Spain
Diacre 68' (pen.)	Report (in French); FFF Report (in French)

Stade Francis Turcan, Martigues
Attendance: 2,967
Referee: Maria Trampusch (Austria)

12 December 1999
12:00

Spain	1–1	Netherlands
Moreno 75'	KNVB Report (in Dutch)	Smith 36'

El Fontanar, Córdoba
Attendance: 2,000
Referee: Elke Günthner (Germany)

1 April 2000

Netherlands	1–2	Spain
Kiesel-Griffioen 70'	KNVB Report (in Dutch)	Gimbert 29'; Fuentes 90+3'

Polman Stadion, Almelo
Attendance: 6,500
Referee: Nicole Mouidi-Petignat (Switzerland)

15 April 2000
18:00

France	2–1	Netherlands
Diacre 33'; Lattaf 58'	Report (in French); KNVB Report (in Dutch)	Smith 16'

Complexe Sportif de Lautard, Castanet-Tolosan
Attendance: 4,500
Referee: Katriina Elovirta (Finland)

29 April 2000
15:00

Sweden	1–1	Netherlands
Sjögran 85'	KNVB Report (in Dutch); SvFF Report (in Swedish)	Smith 62'

Påskbergsvallen, Varberg
Attendance: 2,505
Referee: Lotte Rye Frederiksen (Denmark)

17 May 2000
19:30

Netherlands	0–3	Sweden
	KNVB Report (in Dutch); SvFF Report (in Swedish)	Moström 15', 21'; Nordlund 90'

Het Kasteel, Rotterdam
Attendance: 5,000
Referee: Marta Atzori (Italy)

21 May 2000
12:00

Spain	1–2	France
Mateos Franco 85'	Report (in French)	Mugneret-Béghé 43', 82'

Estadio A Lomba, Vilagarcía de Arousa
Attendance: 2,000
Referee: Vibeke Karlsen (Norway)

1 June 2000
19:00

France	2–0	Sweden
Zenoni 67'; Herbert 83'	Report (in French); SvFF Report (in Swedish)

Stade des Costières, Nîmes
Attendance: 6,787
Referee: Wendy Toms (England)

11 June 2000
16:00

Sweden	7–0	Spain
Svensson 23', 49', 58'; Törnqvist 45'; Fagerström 64'; Call 80'; Bengtsson 90'	SvFF Report (in Swedish)

Nobelstadion, Karlskoga
Attendance: 1,610
Referee: Antje Witteweg (Germany)

France qualified for the final tournament.

Sweden and Spain advanced for the playoff A.

Netherlands advanced for the playoff A-B.

=== Group 2 ===
Team	Pts	Pld	W	D	L	GF	GA
Norway	18	6	6	0	0	25	0
England	10	6	3	1	2	8	13
Portugal	4	6	1	1	4	4	14
Switzerland	3	6	1	0	5	1	11

11 September 1999
15:00

Norway	4–0	Switzerland
R. Gulbrandsen 15'; Aarønes 20'; Knudsen 49'; Lehn 89'	NFF Report (in Norwegian)

Skogen Stadion, Strusshamn
Attendance: 1,300
Referee: Geja Mulder (Netherlands)

16 October 1999

Switzerland	0–3	England

Sportanlagen Trinermatten, Switzerland
Attendance: 800

23 October 1999
15:00

Portugal	0–4	Norway
	FPF Report (in Portuguese); NFF Report (in Norwegian)	Aarønes 12', 53', 90'; Jørgensen 73'

Estádio Vila Amália, Sesimbra
Referee: Cristina Gozzi (Italy)

27 November 1999
15:00

Portugal	0–1	Switzerland
	FPF Report (in Portuguese)	Bea Mettler 44'

Estádio Dr. Magalhães Pessoa, Leiria
Attendance: 1,300
Referee: Florence Dorigny (France)

20 February 2000
14:00

England	2–0	Portugal
Smith 23'; Walker 30'	FPF Report (in Portuguese)

Oakwell, Barnsley
Attendance: 5,114 (new British record)
Referee: Maria Trampusch (Austria)

7 March 2000
19:45

England	0–3	Norway
	NFF Report (in Norwegian)	Pettersen 1'; Kvitland 33'; Rapp 45'

Carrow Road, Norwich
Attendance: 5,142 (new British record)
Referee: Claudine Brohet (Belgium)

1 April 2000
18:00

Switzerland	0–2	Portugal
	FPF Report (in Portuguese)	Maria João Xavier 85'; Anabela 90'

Stade des Trois-Chênes, Thônex
Attendance: 1,200
Referee: Bente Folsing (Denmark)

22 April 2000
16:00

Portugal	2–2	England
Carla Couto 7'; Patrícia Sequeira 57'	FPF Report (in Portuguese)	Burke 40'; Smith 79'

Campo do Sacavenense, Sacavém
Referee: Geja Mulder (Netherlands)

7 May 2000
14:00

Norway	5–0	Portugal
S. Gulbrandsen 13', 38'; Pettersen 72', 87'; R. Gulbrandsen 77'	FPF Report (in Portuguese); NFF Report (in Norwegian)

Melløs stadion, Moss
Attendance: 200
Referee: Maria Patrascu (Romania)

13 May 2000

England	1–0	Switzerland

Memorial Stadium, England
Attendance: 5,900 (new British record)

4 June 2000
18:00

Norway	8–0	England
Mellgren 5', 61'; Rapp 17', 63'; Pettersen 32', 72', 82'; S. Gulbrandsen 42'	NFF Report (in Norwegian)

Melløs stadion, Moss
Referee: Maria Jose Alcantara Negrin (Spain)

24 June 2000
16:00

Switzerland	0–1	Norway
	NFF Report (in Norwegian)	S. Gulbrandsen 87'

Sportplatz Langenen, Interlaken
Attendance: 650
Referee: Lale Orta (Turkey)

Norway qualified for the final tournament.

England and Portugal advanced for the playoff A.

Switzerland advanced for the playoff A-B.

=== Group 3 ===
Team	Pts	Pld	W	D	L	GF	GA
Germany	16	6	5	1	0	27	5
Italy	9	6	2	3	1	6	7
Ukraine	5	6	1	2	3	6	14
Iceland	2	6	0	2	4	4	17

22 August 1999

Ukraine	2–2	Iceland
Zinchenko 45'; Frishko 65'	KSÍ Report (in Icelandic)	Ögmundsdóttir 57'; Helgadóttir 90+2'

Shakhtar Stadium, Donetsk
Attendance: 3,000
Referee: Eva Ödlund (Sweden)

22 September 1999

Iceland	0–0	Italy
	KSÍ Report (in Icelandic); FIGC Report (in Italian)

Laugardalsvöllur, Reykjavík
Attendance: 617
Referee: Bente Ovedie Skogvang (Norway)

23 September 1999
14:00

Germany	3–0	Ukraine
Grings 30', 85'; Fitschen 90'	DFB Report (in German)

Playmobil-Stadion, Fürth
Attendance: 1,900
Referee: Vibeke Karlsen (Norway)

13 October 1999

Italy	1–0	Ukraine
Panico 13'	FIGC Report (in Italian)

Stadio Osvaldo Martini, Castelfranco di Sotto
Referee: Katriina Elovirta (Finland)

14 October 1999

Germany	5–0	Iceland
Grings 6'; Wiegmann 25', 64'; Voss 39'; C. Müller 86'	DFB Report (in German); KSÍ Report (in Icelandic)

Marschweg-Stadion, Oldenburg
Attendance: 2,050
Referee: Lotte Rye Frederiksen (Denmark)

11 November 1999

Italy	4–4	Germany
Panico 29', 37', 68'; Zorri 76'	DFB Report (in German); FIGC Report (in Italian)	Fitschen 7'; Grings 12', 30'; Wiegmann 72'

Nuovo Stadio Contrada Le Piane, Isernia
Attendance: 1,300
Referee: Nicole Petignat (Switzerland)

6 April 2000
15:05

Germany	3–0	Italy
Prinz 18'; Grings 43'; Smisek 82'	DFB Report (in German); FIGC Report (in Italian)

Stadion am Bornheimer Hang, Frankfurt
Attendance: 5,800
Referee: Marianne Mattsson (Sweden)

11 May 2000

Ukraine	1–6	Germany
Verazubova 24'	DFB Report (in German)	Prinz 16', 17', 38', 58'; Grings 40'; C. Müller 73'

NSK Olimpiyskyi, Kyiv

7 June 2000

Italy	1–0	Iceland
Masia 85'	KSÍ Report (in Icelandic); FIGC Report (in Italian)

Stadio Montefeltro, Urbino
Attendance: 2,000
Referee: Rita Ruiz Tacoronte (Spain)

17 June 2000

Ukraine	0–0	Italy
	FIGC Report (in Italian)

Valeriy Lobanovskyi Dynamo Stadium, Kyiv
Referee: Waede (Denmark)

17 August 2000

Iceland	0–6	Germany
	KSÍ Report (in Icelandic); DFB Report (in German)	Jones 3'; Hingst 5'; Prinz 18', 42'; Meinert 85'; C. Müller 90'

Kópavogsvöllur, Kópavogur
Attendance: 250
Referee: Ingrid Jonsson (Sweden)

22 August 2000

Iceland	2–3	Ukraine
Færseth 3'; Ögmundsdóttir 50'	KSÍ Report (in Icelandic)	Myshchenko 11'; Zinchenko 15'; Mazurenko 65'

Laugardalsvöllur, Reykjavík
Attendance: 411
Referee: Regina Konink-Belksma (Netherlands)

Germany qualified for the final tournament.

Italy and Ukraine advanced for the playoff A.

Iceland advanced for the playoff A-B.

=== Group 4 ===
Team	Pts	Pld	W	D	L	GF	GA
Russia	18	6	6	0	0	19	4
Denmark	9	6	3	0	3	22	12
Finland	6	6	2	0	4	5	11
FR Yugoslavia	3	6	1	0	5	2	21

21 August 1999
14:00

Finland	0–2	Russia
	RFS Report (in Russian)	Barbashina 31'; Filippova 74'

Kauniaisten Keskuskenttä, Kauniainen
Attendance: 412
Referee: Regina Belksma-Konink (Netherlands)

18 September 1999

FR Yugoslavia	2–0	Finland
1'; 64'

Čair Stadium, Yugoslavia
Attendance: 3,000
Referee: Rinaldi (Italy)

29 September 1999
18:00

Denmark	2–4	Russia
M. Pedersen 37'; Jokumsen 69'	DBU Report (in Danish); RFS Report (in Russian)	Grigorieva 44'; Sand Christensen 55' (o.g.); Savina 67', 76'

Odense Stadion, Odense
Attendance: 626
Referee: José María Alcantara Negrin (Spain)

9 October 1999
13:00

Russia	4–0	FR Yugoslavia
Egorova 36'; Barbashina 40', 78'; Grigorieva 67'	RFS Report (in Russian)

Eduard Streltsov Stadium, Moscow
Referee: Marianne Mattsson (Sweden)

10 November 1999
19:00

Denmark	6–0	FR Yugoslavia
M. Pedersen 51', 83'; Krogh 71', 77', 85'; Petersen 90'	DBU Report (in Danish)

Odense Stadion, Odense
Attendance: 577
Referee: Wendy Toms (England)

12 April 2000
18:00

Denmark	3–1	Finland
Jokumsen 1', 20', 40'	DBU Report (in Danish)	Ekström 36'

Odense Stadion, Odense
Attendance: 228
Referee: Elke Fielenbach (Germany)
Finland info

20 May 2000
13:00

Russia	3–0	Finland
Svetlitskaya 57', 60'; Barbashina 74'	RFS Report (in Russian)

Stroitel Stadium, Selyatino
Referee: Wendy Toms (England)

24 May 2000
19:00

FR Yugoslavia	0–8	Denmark
	DBU Report (in Danish)	J. Johansen 14', 86'; Krogh 15', 53'; M. Pedersen 23' ?? 40' (o.g.); M. Møller 55'; J. Madsen 89'

Stadion Karađorđe, Novi Sad
Attendance: 2,700
Referee: Eva Ödlund (Sweden)

1 June 2000
13:00

Finland	2–1	Denmark
Lappi-Seppälä 55'; Julin 57'	DBU Report (in Danish)	Krogh 26'

Mikkelin Urheilupuisto, Mikkeli
Attendance: 849
Referee: Bente Ovedie Skogvang (Norway)
Finland info

14 June 2000
13:00

Russia	5–2	Denmark
Svetlitskaya 7'; Letyushova 20'; Savina 61', 65', 90'	DBU Report (in Danish); RFS Report (in Russian)	Krogh 3'; L. Jensen 5'

Stroitel Stadium, Selyatino
Referee: Nicole Petignat (Switzerland)

24 June 2000
18:00

FR Yugoslavia	0–1	Russia
	RFS Report (in Russian)	Kremleva 37'

Stadion kraj Carske pruge, Niš
Referee: Christine Frai (Germany)

1 July 2000

Finland	2–0	FR Yugoslavia
Ekström; Kalmari

Finland
Referee:
Finland info

Russia qualified for the final tournament.

Denmark and Finland advanced for the playoff A.

Yugoslavia advanced for the playoff A-B.

== CLASS B ==
=== Group 5 ===
Team	Pts	Pld	W	D	L	GF	GA
Belgium	16	6	5	1	0	20	4
Poland	11	6	3	2	1	16	11
Austria	4	6	1	1	4	6	14
Wales	2	6	0	2	4	3	16

18 September 1999

Poland	4–1	Austria

Poland

3 October 1999

Wales	0–4	Poland

Wales

16 October 1999
16:00

Belgium	3–1	Austria
Maes 62', 69'; Carnol 90'	KBVB Report (in Dutch)	Hufnagl 49'

Sportstadion Deroover, Machelen
Referee: Galina Doneva (Bulgaria)

24 October 1999

Austria	1–1	Wales

Austria

6 November 1999
15:00

Belgium	4–1	Poland
Saelens 7'; Carnol 27', 90'; Maes 34'	KBVB Report (in Dutch)	Szondermajer 24'

Stade Justin Peeters, Wavre
Referee: Anri Saarivainio Hänninen (Finland)

1 December 1999
20:00

Wales	0–2	Belgium
	KBVB Report (in Dutch)	Maes 49', 54'

Stebonheath Park, Llanelli
Referee: Kristin Nordal Mette (Norway)

26 March 2000
16:00

Belgium	6–0	Wales
Saelens 4', 24', 90'; Callebaut 27'; Dermul 70'; Heiremans 83'	KBVB Report (in Dutch)

Lambert Stadion, Ciney
Referee: Nadezhda Ulyanovskaya (Russia)

15 April 2000
17:30

Austria	0–3	Belgium
	KBVB Report (in Dutch)	Faustenhammer 19' (o.g.); Maes 66'; Carnol 89'

Waldviertler Volksbank Arena, Horn
Referee: Cristina Ionescu Floarea (Romania)

29 April 2000

Austria	2–3	Poland

Austria

6 May 2000
16:30

Poland	2–2	Belgium
Cubala 36'; Otrebska 53'	KBVB Report (in Dutch)	Vanden Broeke 32'; Carnol 33'

Miejski Im. Złotej Jedenastki, Konin
Referee: Sabrina Rinaldi (Italy)

14 May 2000

Wales	0–1	Austria

Wales

27 May 2000

Poland	2–2	Wales

Poland

Belgium advanced for the playoff A-B.

=== Group 6 ===
Team	Pts	Pld	W	D	L	GF	GA
Czech Republic	13	6	4	1	1	18	5
Scotland	12	6	4	0	2	16	11
Republic of Ireland	7	6	2	1	3	6	12
Croatia	3	6	1	0	5	7	19

3 October 1999
14:00

Scotland	3–0	Republic of Ireland
Burns 8', 64'; Fleeting 56'	FAI Report

Broadwood, Cumbernauld
Referee: Tiziana Calamosca (Italy)

17 October 1999
14:00

Czech Republic	1–1	Republic of Ireland
Došková 13'	FAI Report; FAČR Report (in Czech)	O'Shea 87'

FK Chmel, Blšany
Attendance: 950
Referee: Iwona Malek-wybraniec (Poland)

23 October 1999
15:30

Croatia	4–3	Scotland
Logarušić 25'; Kozić 49'; Milas 57'; Franić 72'	HNS Report	?? ?? ??

Veli Jože, Poreč
Attendance: 70
Referee: Antonia Kokotou (Greece)

30 October 1999
19:30

Republic of Ireland	2–0	Croatia
Grant 53'; O'Shea 88'	FAI Report; HNS Report

Richmond Park, Dublin
Referee: Maria Patrascu (Romania)

14 November 1999
14:00

Scotland	2–1	Czech Republic
Fleeting 71', 80'	FAČR Report (in Czech)	Chlumecká 6'

Broadwood, Cumbernauld
Referee: Geja Mulder (Netherlands)

29 April 2000
13:30

Republic of Ireland	0–3	Scotland
	FAI Report	Fleeting 44', 45'; James 69'

Richmond Park, Dublin
Referee: Christine Frai (Germany)

6 May 2000
17:00

Croatia	1–3	Republic of Ireland
Jakšić 89'	FAI Report; HNS Report	Reilly 56'; Thorpe 73'; Grant 90'

ŠRC Velika Gorica, Velika Gorica
Attendance: 400
Referee: Rita Ruiz Tacoronte (Spain)

14 May 2000

Scotland	4–1	Croatia
?? ?? ?? ??	HNS Report	Damjanović 5'

Forthbank Stadium, Stirling
Referee: Marianne Mattsson (Sweden)

28 May 2000
14:00

Republic of Ireland	0–4	Czech Republic
	FAI Report; FAČR Report (in Czech)	Chlumecká 21'; Ščasná 68'; Dudová 74'; Došková 81'

Bridgewater Centre Park, Arklow
Referee: Nadezhda Ulyanovskaya (Russia)

17 June 2000
17:00

Croatia	1–2	Czech Republic
Milas 8'	FAČR Report (in Czech); HNS Report	Došková 45'; Urbancová 48'

NK Inter Zaprešić, Zaprešić
Referee: Hilal Tuba Tosun (Turkey)

1 July 2000
16:30

Czech Republic	5–0	Croatia
Chlumecká 18'; Ščasná 25'; Macková 45'; Jedličková 54'; Adámková 80'	FAČR Report (in Czech); HNS Report

SK Vranovice, Vranovice
Attendance: 1,200
Referee: Marta Atzori (Italy)

26 August 2000
16:30

Czech Republic	5–1	Scotland
Chlumecká 7', 35'; Jedličková 45', 51'; Dudová 75'	FAČR Report (in Czech)	Fleeting 1'

FK Chmel, Blšany
Attendance: 1,061
Referee: Galina Doneva (Bulgaria)

Czech Republic advanced for the playoff A-B.

=== Group 7 ===
Team	Pts	Pld	W	D	L	GF	GA
Romania	22	8	7	1	0	34	5
Belarus	16	8	5	1	2	20	9
Slovakia	15	8	5	0	3	23	10
Israel	6	8	2	0	6	5	26
Estonia	0	8	0	0	8	6	38

11 August 1999

Belarus	4–1	Estonia
?? ?? ?? ??	EJL Report (in Estonian)	Vaher 22' (pen.)

Spartak Stadium, Bobruisk
Attendance: 1,000
Referee: Dagmar Damková (Czech Republic)

4 September 1999

Estonia	0–4	Slovakia
	EJL Report (in Estonian) / SFZ Report (in Slovak)	Budošová 35' Škodlerová 41'; Juríková 55' Babuliaková 70'

Kuressaare linnastaadion, Kuressaare
Attendance: 100
Referee: Elke Fielenbach (Germany)

16 September 1999

Estonia	2–6	Romania
Morkovkina 51', 88'	EJL Report (in Estonian)	?? ?? ?? ?? ?? ??

Valga Keskstaadion, Valga
Attendance: 80
Referee: Lotte Rye Frederiksen (Denmark)

17 September 1999

Israel	0–5	Belarus

Israel

7 October 1999

Belarus	1–0	Slovakia
Sysoeva 73'	/ SFZ Report (in Slovak)	Budošová (yellow card) 88'

City Stadium, Molodechno
Attendance: Regina Konink-Belksma Nederland

19 October 1999

Israel	2–1	Estonia
?? ??	EJL Report (in Estonian)	Kuusik 8'

Herzliya Municipal Stadium, Herzliya
Attendance: 200
Referee: Antje Witteweg (Germany)

24 October 1999

Romania	1–1	Belarus

Romania

31 October 1999

Israel	0–4	Romania

Israel

16 November 1999

Israel	0–5	Slovakia
Avidan (yellow card) 52' Jean (yellow card) 73'	/ SFZ Report (in Slovak)	Lukácsová 28', 39', 61' Geržová 46' Gajdošová 83'

Bat-Yam, Israel
Referee: Nadezhda Ulianovskaia Russia

25 April 2000

Slovakia	4–0	Israel
Geržová 30', 81' Beregszasziova 36', 90' Čillíková (yellow card) 89'	/ SFZ Report (in Slovak)	Knafo (yellow card) 25'

Nitra, Slovakia
Referee: Antonia Kokotou Greece

17 May 2000

Estonia	0–7	Belarus
	EJL Report (in Estonian)

Valga Keskstaadion, Valga
Attendance: 142
Referee: Urszula Norek Wrona (Poland)

18 May 2000

Romania	4–1	Slovakia
Ciorba 1', 15', 73' Nagy (yellow card) 38' Enache 45+2' Ciorba (yellow card) 54' Ducan (yellow card) 66' Gabor (yellow card) 77'	/ SFZ Report (in Slovak)	Beregszasziova (yellow card) 24' Čillíková (yellow card) 48' Gajdošová (yellow card) 57' Gajdošová 67'

Campina, Romania
Referee: Sabrina Rinaldi Italia

6 June 2000

Romania	5–1	Israel

Romania

15 June 2000

Slovakia	0–3	Romania
	/ SFZ Report (in Slovak)	Ciorba 59', 86'; Laslo 7'

Myjava, Slovakia
Referee: Iwona Malek-Wybraniec Poland

27 June 2000

Estonia	1–2	Israel
Morkovkina 19' (pen.)	EJL Report (in Estonian)	?? ??

Maarjamäe Stadium, Tallinn
Attendance: 100
Referee: Natalia Avdonchenko (Russia)

29 June 2000

Belarus	0–1	Romania

Yunost Stadium, Mozyr

5 July 2000

Belarus	1–0	Israel

Traktor Stadium, Minsk

5 August 2000

Slovakia	6–1	Belarus
Lukácsová 22', 76' Beregszasziova 45', 84' Gajdošová 51' Budošová 82' Surovcová (yellow card) 45'	/ SFZ Report (in Slovak)	Kuzniatsova 59' Shpak (yellow card) 8' Ryzhova (yellow card) 51' Astashova (yellow card) 52' Kuzniatsova (yellow card) 63'

Stropkov, Slovakia
Referee: Vibeke Karlsen Norway

26 August 2000

Romania	10–0	Estonia
	EJL Report (in Estonian)

Stadionul Poiana, Câmpina
Attendance: 100
Referee: Florence Dorigny (France)

29 August 2000

Slovakia	3–1	Estonia
Lukácsová 12' Beregszasziova 14' Ižová 33' Čillíková (yellow card) 25' Gajdošová (yellow card) 85'	EJL Report (in Estonian) / SFZ Report (in Slovak)	Morkovkina 87'

Mestský Stadión, Žiar nad Hronom
Attendance: 1,130
Referee: Ilonka Milanova Djaleva (Bulgaria)

Romania advanced for the playoff A-B.

=== Group 8 ===
Team	Pts	Pld	W	D	L	GF	GA
Hungary	18	6	6	0	0	44	2
Greece	10	6	3	1	2	10	17
Turkey	7	6	2	1	3	13	20
Bosnia and Herzegovina	0	6	0	0	6	4	32

24 July 1999
17:30

Bosnia and Herzegovina	2–6	Turkey
?? ??	TFF Report	Gündüz 11'; Eryurt 30', 40'; Yüksekoğlu 50'; Çakmak 87'; Bakır 88'

Gradski Stadion, Velika Kladuša
Referee: Marta Atzori (Italy)

4 September 1999

Hungary	13–0	Bosnia and Herzegovina

Hungary

2 October 1999

Greece	0–8	Hungary

Greece

16 October 1999

Bosnia and Herzegovina	1–3	Greece

Bosnia and Herzegovina

3 November 1999
14:00

Turkey	2–8	Hungary
Çakmak 22', 64'	TFF Report	?? ?? ?? ?? ?? ?? ?? ??

Alsancak Stadi, İzmir
Referee: Lilach Asulin (Israel)

18 December 1999

Greece	0–0	Turkey
	TFF Report

Municipal Stadium, Karditsa
Referee: Nicole Mouidi-Petignat (Switzerland)

16 February 2000
13:30

Turkey	3–1	Bosnia and Herzegovina
Eryurt 53', 57'; Demirci 66'	TFF Report	??

Vefa Stadium, Istanbul
Referee: Galina Doneva (Bulgaria)

4 March 2000

Greece	4–0	Bosnia and Herzegovina

Greece

8 April 2000

Hungary	6–0	Greece

Hungary

26 April 2000
16:00

Hungary	6–0	Turkey
	TFF Report

Széktói Stadion, Kecskemét
Referee: Bente Ovedie Skogvang (Norway)

13 May 2000
16:00

Turkey	2–3	Greece
Gündüz 19', 63'	TFF Report	Su 32' (o.g.) ?? ??

19 Mayıs Stadium, Ankara
Referee: Antje Witteweg (Germany)

13 May 2000

Bosnia and Herzegovina	0–3	Hungary

Bosnia and Herzegovina

Hungary advanced for the playoff A-B.

== PLAYOFF A ==
=== First leg ===
18 October 2000
19:00

Sweden	5–1	Finland
Nordlund 8'; Sandell 14'; Ljungberg 16', 40', 56'	SvFF Report (in Swedish)	Seppänen 45'

Stadsparksvallen, Jönköping
Attendance: 3,746
Referee: Rita Ruiz Tacoronte (Spain)
Finland info

18 October 2000
15:30 (UTC+1)

Italy	3–0	Portugal
D'Astolfo 7'; Zorri 54'; Guarino 90'	FPF Report (in Portuguese); FIGC Report (in Italian)

Stadio Renzo Barbera, Palermo
Referee: Ingrid Jonsson (Sweden)

22 October 2000

Spain	1–6	Denmark
Gimbert 26'	DBU Report (in Danish)	L. Jensen 17'; Krogh 54', 56', 80'; M. Pedersen 70', 85'

Estadio El Plantío, Burgos
Attendance: 4,300
Referee: Christine Frai (Germany)

30 October 2000

Ukraine	1–2	England

Kolos, Boryspil
Referee: Bente Ovedie Skogvang (Norway)

=== Second leg ===
5 November 2000
13:00

Finland	2–5	Sweden
Kalmari 21'; Sarapää 44'	SvFF Report (in Swedish)	M. Andersson 13'; Silander 17' (o.g.); Ljungberg 56', 72'; Moström 83'

ISS Stadion, Vantaa
Attendance: 590
Referee: Geja Mulder (Netherlands)
Finland info

Sweden won 10–3 on aggregate.

21 November 2000
18:00

Denmark	4–2	Spain
Krogh 20', 21'; C. Petersen 50'; M. Pedersen 56'	DBU Report (in Danish)	Cabezón 3'; Mateos 57'

Odense Stadion, Odense
Attendance: 621
Referee: Wendy Toms (England)

Denmark won 10–3 on aggregate.

22 November 2000
15:00 (UTC)

Portugal	1–0	Italy
Bé 51' (pen.)	FPF Report (in Portuguese); FIGC Report (in Italian)

Estádio Municipal de Portalegre, Portalegre
Referee: Claudine Brohet (Belgium)

Italy won 3–1 on aggregate.

28 November 2000

England	2–0	Ukraine

Brisbane Road, London
Attendance: 7,102 NEW BRITISH RECORD
Referee: Sabrina Rinaldi (Italy)

England won 4–1 on aggregate.

Sweden, Denmark, Italy and England qualified for the final tournament.

== PLAYOFF A-B ==
=== First leg ===
21 September 2000

Romania	2–2	Iceland
?? ??	KSÍ Report (in Icelandic)	Færseth 25'; Ögmundsdóttir 75'

Stadionul Poiana, Câmpina
Attendance: 300
Referee: Dagmar Damková (Czech Republic)

14 October 2000
12:00

Hungary	0–3	Netherlands
	KNVB Report (in Dutch)	Muller 28'; Noom 64'; Kiesel-Griffioen 80'

Büki TK Bükfürdő, Bük
Attendance: 400
Referee: Iwona Malek-Wybraniec (Poland)

14 October 2000
15:00

Belgium	1–1	Switzerland
Kimpe 83'	KBVB Report (in Dutch)	Kälin 70'

Frans Lathouwersstadion, Wolvertem
Referee: Natalia Avdonchenko (Russia)

14 October 2000
15:00

Czech Republic	1–0	FR Yugoslavia
Šmeralová 37'	FAČR Report (in Czech)

Fotbalový Stadion, Brumov-Bylnice
Attendance: 1,150
Referee: Floarea Babadac-Ionescu (Romania)

=== Second leg ===
30 September 2000

Iceland	8–0	Romania
Helgadóttir 23'; Ögmundsdóttir 31', 64', 69', 79'; K. Jónsdóttir 58'; G. Jónsdóttir 67'; Hendriksdóttir 87'	KSÍ Report (in Icelandic)

Laugardalsvöllur, Reykjavík
Attendance: 357
Referee: Bente Folsing (Denmark)

Iceland won 10–2 on aggregate.

18 November 2000
16:00

Switzerland	0–0	Belgium
	KBVB Report (in Dutch)

Condémines, Sierre
Referee: Katriina Elovirta (Finland)

Switzerland won 1–1 on away goals.

18 November 2000
19:00

Netherlands	2–0	Hungary
Torny 2', 86'	KNVB Report (in Dutch)

Polman Stadion, Almelo
Attendance: 6,200
Referee: Lale Orta (Turkey)

Netherlands won 5–0 on aggregate.

19 November 2000
13:30

FR Yugoslavia	2–3	Czech Republic
Žukovski 48'; Stanojevič 78'	FAČR Report (in Czech)	Ščasná 4'; Šmeralová 7'; Došková 25'

Čair Stadium, Niš
Attendance: 1,500
Referee: Caroline De Boeck (Belgium)

Czech Republic won 4–2 on aggregate.
