= Nurhan =

Nurhan is a Turkish unisex name and may refer to:

== Given name ==
- Nurhan Atasoy (born 1934), Turkish art historian
- Nurhan Çakmak (born 1981), Turkish women's footballer
- Nurhan Çınar (born 1994), Turkish field hockey player
- Nurhan Fırat (born 1972), Turkish karateka
- Nurhan Süleymanoğlu (born 1971), Turkish boxer
