= Özge Kanbay =

Turkish footballer and referee (1996–2019)

- Born: 4 November 1996; Hamburg, Germany
- Died: 25 February 2019 (aged 22); Manisa, Turkey
Association football career
Senior career*
Years	Team	Apps	(Gls)
2013–2015	Karşıyaka BESEM Spor	24	(4)
2015–2016	Manisa Esnaf GS	6	(6)
Total		30	(10)
Refereeing career
- Other occupation: Student
Domestic
Years	League	Role
2016–2017	Reg. Dev. U-14, U-15, U-16, U-17	Asst. referee
2016–2017	Reg. Dev. U-14, U-15, U-16, U-17	Referee
2017	Reg. Dev. U-17	Fourth Official
2016	Women's Third	Asst. referee
2017	Women's Third	Referee
2017–2018	U-21	Referee
2017–2018	U-21	Fourth Official
2017	Reg. Amateur	Fourth Official
2017–2018	Reg. Dev. U-19	Referee
2017–2018	Women's First	Referee
- * Club domestic league appearances and goals

Özge Kanbay (4 November 1996 – 25 February 2019) was a Turkish women's footballer, and female football referee. She was also a rugby sevens player. The 2019–20 Turkish women's football season and the 2020 Turkish Women's Rugby sevens League season were named in honor of her, after she died in February 2019 from cancer.

== Private life ==
Kanbay was born in Hamburg, Germany, on 4 November 1996. She has an elder sister Gamze Kanbay Özkan.

Kanbay was a final grade student of physical education and sports teaching in the Faculty of Sports Sciences at the Manisa Celal Bayar University (MCBÜ).

== Playing career ==
Kanbay obtained her footballer license from the İzmir-based club Karşıyaka BESEM Spor on 31 October 2013. She appeared for her team in 14 matches of the 2013-14 Women's Second League and scored four goals. Her team finished the league season as group runner-up. She enjoyed her team's promotion to the Women's First League in the 2014–15 season. She capped in ten matches of the Women's First League. At the end of the season, her team was relegated to the Second League. She then transferred to Manisa Esnaf GS to play in the Women's Third League. After appearing in six matches and netting six goals in the first half of the season, she ended her football playing career.

Kanbay was also a rugby sevens player.

== Officiating career ==
Kanbay began her officiating career on 9 September 2016 as an assistant referee in a Regional Development Boys U-15 match. On 3 December the same year, she officiated a Regional Development Boys U-14 match as referee. She served as an assistant referee in a Women's Third League match on 25 December 2016. She was tasked as the fourth official in a Men's U-21 match on 17 September 2017, and the as referee again in a Men's U-21 match on 30 September that year. On 3 December 2017, Kanbay officiated for the first time a Women's First League match as a referee. She continued her career as referee mostly for Men's U-21 and Women's First League matches. She served at various positions in 56 matches until 7 May 2018.

== Illness and death ==
Kanbay contracted uterine cancer. She was hospitalized in the Hafsa Sultan Hospital of the MCBÜ in Manisa for treatment, where she died at the age of 22 on 25 February 2019.

== Legacy ==
The Turkish Football Federation named the 2019-20 women's football league seasons in her commemoration. The Turkish Rugby Federation dedicated the 2020 Women's Rugby sevens League season to Özge Kanbay. The newly established women's beach rugby team, named "Özge Kanbay" in honor of her, won the women's category of the 4th International Istanbul Beach rugby tournament held in Kadıköy, Istanbul in mid July 2019.
