= Nurhan Çakmak =

Turkish footballer (born 1981)

Personal information
- Full name: Nur Nurhan Çakmak
- Date of birth: June 3, 1981 (age 45)
- Place of birth: Istanbul, Turkey
- Position: Forward

Team information
- Current team: Kireçburnu Spor
- Number: 20

Senior career*
Years	Team	Apps	(Gls)
1999–2003	Onurspor		
2010–2011	Bakırköy Gençlikspor	10	(12)
2011–2013	Bakırköy Zaraspor	13	(10)
2014	Kireçburnu Spor	8	(5)

International career^{‡}
1999	Turkey U18	2	(5)
1999–2000	Turkey	6	(4)
- * Club domestic league appearances and goals as of April 27, 2014 ‡ National team caps and goals as of April 26, 2000

Nur Nurhan Çakmak (born June 3, 1981) is a Turkish former women's footballer who played as a forward. She was a member of the Turkish national team in the years 1999 and 2000.

== Life ==
Nur Nurhan Çakmak was born in Istanbul, Turkey on June 3, 1981.

== Playing career ==
=== Club ===
Nurhan Çakmak obtained her license for Maltepe Yalıspor on November 10, 1999. She was loaned out to Onurspor, where she played between 1999 and 2003. The women's football leagues were suspended between 2004 and 2006. In the 2010–11 season, she was part of Bakırköy Gençlikspor, for which she appeared in 10 games and scored 12 goals. In 2011, Çaymak was transferred by Bakırköy Zaraspor. In two seasons, the team's captain was capped 13 times netting 10 goals. Currently, she plays for Kireçburnu Spor in Division 6 of the Second League.

=== International ===
Çakmak was admitted to the Turkey women's national under-18 football team and played in two 1999 UEFA Women's Under-18 Championship qualification round matches. She scored in her first match four goals against the Moldovian junior women and then one goal against the Slovenians.

She debuted in the senior women's national team in the friendly match against Israel on July 1, 1999, at which she netted a goal. Çakmak appeared at the 2001 UEFA Women's Championship qualification – Group 8 matches scoring one goal against Bosnia and Herzegovina and two honor goals of her team against Hungary. She capped ten times in total for the national team until April 2000, playing in eight matches of the 2001 UEFA Women's Championship qualification round.

International goals
Date	Venue	Opponent	Result	Competition	Scored
Turkey women's national under-18
May 11, 1999	Sakarya Atatürk Stadium, Adapazarı, Turkey	Moldova	7–1	1999 UEFA Women's Under-18 Championship qualification	4
May 15, 1999	Sakarya Atatürk Stadium, Adapazarı, Turkey	Slovenia	8–0	1999 UEFA Women's Under-18 Championship qualification	1
Turkey women's national
July 1, 1999	Vefa Stadium, Istanbul, Turkey	Israel	2–0	Friendly	1
July 24, 1999	Velika Kladuša, Bosnia and Herzegovina	Bosnia and Herzegovina	6–2	2001 UEFA Women's Championship qualification – Group 8	1
November 3, 1999	Alsancak Stadium, İzmir, Turkey	Hungary	2–8	2001 UEFA Women's Championship qualification – Group 8	2
