= Necla Akdoğan =

Turkish footballer, manager, and referee

Personal information
- Date of birth: 10 November 1971 (age 54)
- Place of birth: Çarşamba, Samsun, Turkey

Senior career*
Years	Team	Apps	(Gls)
1997–1998	Bursa Delphi Packardspor		
1998	Gürtaşspor		

International career
1995–1998	Turkey	13	(0)

Managerial career
- 2010–2013: Ankara Gençlik Gücü Spor
- 2013: Ankara 1910 Spor
Refereeing career
Domestic
Years	League	Role
2003–2009	TFF Third	1st Ass. referee
2003–2009	Amateur, TFF Third	2nd Ass. referee
2004–2008	TFF Third	Fourth official
2005–2009	Amateur, Women's First	Referee
International
Years	League	Role
2006–2008	UEFA U-19 Champ.	Ass. referee
- * Club domestic league appearances and goals

Necla Akdoğan (born 10 November 1971) is a Turkish former footballer, referee and manager. She was a member of the Turkey women's national team. She serves a teacher of physical education.

== Personal life ==
Necla Akdoğan was born in Çarşamba district of Samsun Province, northern Turkey on 10 November 1971. She has three sisters and a brother.

Akdoğan was inspired in playing football by her elder brother, a footballer. Her brother used to choose her as a partner for training. She decided to pursue a footballer career when she admired the female footballer in the television film Zafere Kaçış ("Escape to Victory"), she had watched once. In her youth, she performed athletics. She won titles in middle-distance and long-distance running.

She graduated in physical education from the Karadeniz Technical University in Trabzon. She was appointed to a school in Anlkara as a teacher of physical education.

== Club career ==
Akdoğa began her football playing career during her university years. She obtained her license for the Bursa Delphi Packardspor on 15 August 1997. The next season, she transferred to the newly established Gürtaşspor in Ankara playing in the Women's League.

She is the first ever recipient of the Fair Play Award of the Women's League in the 1994–95 season.

== International career ==
Akdoğan was admitted to the Turkey women's team, and debuted in the friendly match against Romania on 8 September 1995. She played in two matches of the UEFA Women's Euro 1997 qualification – Group 8 against Hungary and Bulgaria in 1995 and 1996. She appeared in five games of the 1999 FIFA Women's World Cup qualification (UEFA) – Group 7 against Georgia, Bulgaria, Greece and Yugoslavia in 1997 and 1998. She capped thirteen times for the Turkey national team.

== Refereeing career ==
Akdoğan served as referee between 2003 and 2009. She officiated in total 69 matches in the men's and women's leagues of Amateur, TFF Third and Women's First as assistant referee, fourth official and referee.

Between 2006 and 2008, she served as a FIFA-listed assistant referee. She was assigned assistant to FIFA-listed female Turkish referee Dilan Deniz Gökçek in the matches at the 2007 UEFA Women's U-19 Championship qualifying round in Italy on 10–15 April. She officiated as assistant referee the 7th European Women's Championship in Turkey in November 2006.

In February 2010, she resigned from her referee post when her expectation to become a FIFA-listed referee did not realize.

She is occasionally invited to officiate unofficial friendly matches even after her retirement.

== Managerial career ==
Akdoğa served as an instructor for children of age 7–8 in the farm of Gençlerbirliği S.K. in Ankara in 2011. She also had the a mother role although not married.

She was in charge of manager of the women's football clubs in Ankara. She coached Ankara Gençlik Gücü Spor three seasons beginning in the 2010–11 season. She then transferred to the Ankara 1910 Spor for the 2013–14 season.

Akdoğan was on the board member of the Turkey Football Managers Association's (Turkish: Türkiye Futbol Antrenörleri Derneği) Ankara Branch.

== Honours ==
- Fair Play Award (1994–95).
