= 1994 Turkish Women's Football League =

Turkish Women's First Football League
- Season: 1994
- Dates: 2 April 1994 – 21 May 1994
- Champions: Dinarsuspor 1st title
- Matches: 42
- All statistics correct as of 21 My 1994.

The 1994 season of the Turkish Women's Football League was the first season of Turkey's premier women's football league. In its meeting on 22 December 1993, the Turkish Football Federation decided to officially establish a women's football league in Turkey. The league consisted of 16 totally amateur clubs competing in four groups. The league started with group matches on 2 April 1994, and ended on 21 May 1994 with the final match played. Dinarsuspor became the first league champion after defeating Acarlarspor with 3–1 in the final.

== Teams ==
Location of teams in the 1984 season of Turkish Women's Football League. Number of teams in parentheses.

Team	Location
Acarlarspor	Istanbul
Altay	İzmir
Ankara BB	Ankara
Bursaspor	Bursa
Demetevler	Ankara
Dinarsuspor	Istanbul
Dostluk	Istanbul
Edirnespor	Edirne
Gümüşsuyuspor	Istanbul
Kartalspor	Istanbul
Kütahya Çinispor	Kütahya
Mersin Camspor	Mersin
Özbostancı	Istanbul
Sitespor	Istanbul
Taçspor	Istanbul
Yeni Dünya Spor	Sakarya

== League table ==
Group 1

Pos	Team	Pld	W	D	L	GF	GA	GD	Pts
1	Özbostancı	6	6	0	0	51	0	+51	16
2	Demetevler	6	2	1	3	16	21	-5	7
3	Taçspor	5	2	1	2	8	17	-9	7
4	Kütahya Çinispor	5	0	0	5	2	39	-37	0

Group 2

Pos	Team	Pld	W	D	L	GF	GA	GD	Pts
1	Acarlarspor	5	4	1	0	21	6	+15	13
2	Ankara BB	5	3	1	1	11	5	^6	10
3	Mersin Camspor	6	2	0	4	5	13	-8	6
4	Yeni Dünya	4	0	0	4	3	16	-13	0

Group 3

Pos	Team	Pld	W	D	L	GF	GA	GD	Pts
1	Altay	5	4	1	0	29	8	+21	13
2	Dostluk	4	3	0	1	15	9	+6	9
3	Bursaspor	5	1	1	3	9	15	-6	4
4	Gümüşsuyu	4	0	0	4	5	26	-21	0

Group 4

Pos	Team	Pld	W	D	L	GF	GA	GD	Pts
1	Dinarsuspor	6	5	0	1	33	2	+31	15
2	Sitespor	5	4	0	1	20	8	+12	12
3	Kartal	6	2	0	4	17	18	-1	6
4	Edirne	5	0	0	5	1	43	-42	0

Green marks a team promoted to the semi-finals.

Final

Dinarsuspor 3–1 Acarlarspor
