= Aysun Boyacı =

Turkish footballer (born 1972)

Personal information
- Date of birth: 1972 (age 53–54)
- Place of birth: Karadeniz Ereğli, Turkey

Senior career*
Years	Team	Apps	(Gls)
1991–1996	Dinarsuspor		

Managerial career
- 2005–2010: Turkey girls' U-15; Turkey girls' U-17; Turkey women's U-19; Turkey women's
- * Club domestic league appearances and goals

Aysun Boyacı (born 1972) is a Turkish former footballer, a national teams coach and high school teacher of physical education.

Boyacı played for the Istanbul-based Dinasruspor in the Turkish Women's League between 1991 and 1996. After graduation in Physical Education with distinction in Football from Marmara University in 1996, she started a career as a teacher for physical education.

In 2005, she was appointed coach for the Turkey women's national football teams by the Turkish Football Federation. She served until 2010 as the coach of the Turkey women's national, the women's U-19, the girls' U-17 team, and technical director of the girls' U-15 team.

Currently, she works as a teacher at the Vocational High School in Kadıköy, Istanbul, and serves as the coach of the school's football team for boys.
