= Mitzi Møller =

Danish footballer (born 1979)

Personal information
- Date of birth: 2 October 1979 (age 47)
- Position: Defender

Senior career*
Years	Team	Apps	(Gls)
- Hillerød G&IF

International career
	Denmark	43	(0)
- * Club domestic league appearances and goals

Mitzi Møller (born 2 October 1979) is a Danish retired defender who played for Hillerød G&IF and the Danish national team.

== International career ==
Møller was also part of the Danish team at the 2001 European Championships.
