= Marshall Boyaspor =

Marshall Boyaspor was a Turkish women's football club based in Istanbul.

== History ==
Marshall Boyaspor were founded as a women's football club of the paint producer "Marshall Boya", which was established as a Turkish company in 1954, and was bought by the Amsterdam-based Dutch multinational corporation AkzoNobel in 1998. Club's colors were green and white. Club president was Ender Merter.

The team became champion in the 1997-98 Women's League season and 1998–99 Women's League season.

== Honours ==
Turkish Women's Football League

- Winners (2): 1997–98*, 1998–99, ~~1999-00~~
- Runners-up (2): 1996–97**, 1999–00

Turkish Women's Federation Cup

- Winners (1): 1997–98*,

* as Zara Ekinlispor, ** as İstanbul Sitespor

== Scandal ==
The team finished the Turkish Women's 1999–2000 League season at top place. Upon the request of Delta Mobilyaspor, which finished the season at second place, the Turkish Football Federation launched an investigation into a possible foul play, and determined that the team and Gemlik Zeytinspor have match-fixed. The Federation ruled that both teams were to be relegated to one lower league. As there existed no Women's Second League at that time, both teams were barred from playing for the period of one year. Players of both teams were allowed to transfer to other clubs.

As league champion of the 1999–2000 season, Delta Mobilyaspor were registered.

== Notable players ==
Players, who were member of the Turkey women's national team:

- Feride Akgün
- Seyhan Gündüz
- Ayşe Kuru
