= Ayfer Topluoğlu =

Turkish footballer and manager

Personal information
- Date of birth: January 31, 1977 (age 49)
- Place of birth: Çatalca, Istanbul, Turkey
- Position: Goalkeeper

Senior career*
Years	Team	Apps	(Gls)
1993–1997	Dinarsuspor		
1997–1998	Adana Yataşspor		
1998–1999	Gemlik Zeytinspor		
1999–2000	Delta Mobilyaspor		
2002–2003	Adana İdmanyurduspor		

International career
1995–2001	Turkey	31	(0)
- * Club domestic league appearances and goals

Ayfer Topluoğlu (born January 31, 1977) is a Turkish former women's football goalkeeper and manager. She was member of the Turkey women's national team between 1995 and 2003.

== Early life ==
Ayfer Topluoğlu was born in Çatalca district of Istanbul Province on January 31, 1977. She graduated from Büyükçekmece Highschool.

== Playing career ==
Before she switched over to football sport, Ayfer Topluoğlu was a professional basketball player for Bakırköyspor in Istanbul from 1990 to 1993.

=== Clubs ===
Between 1993 and 1997, she played football as goalkeeper in Dinarsuspor, where she enjoyed four Women's League champions titles consecutively, two of them as undefeated. She then transferred to Adana Yataşspor (1997–1998), Gemlik Zeytinspor (1998–1999). In the 1999–2000 season, she played for Delta Mobilyaspor, which became league champion. Finally, she moved to Adana İdmanyurduspor for the 2002–03 season.

=== International ===
She debuted at the Turkey women's national team in the friendly match against Romania on September 10, 1995. She participated at the 1997 UEFA Women's Championship qualification – Group 8, 1999 FIFA Women's World Cup qualification (UEFA) – Group G, 1998 Women's Harvest Cup, 2001 UEFA Women's Championship qualification – Group 8 and 2003 FIFA Women's World Cup qualification (UEFA) – Group 8 matches. She capped in total 30 times for the women's national team, and became so one of the most capped players.

== Coaching career ==
Following her retirement from active sports at the end of the 2002–03 season, Topluoğlu pursued a manager career. In the years 2002–2004, she acted as goalkeeper coach in the Tunkaya Football School, and then between 2004 and 2006 team coach at Gürpınarspor. In 2003, she was appointed assistant coach of the Turkey junior women's national team.

== Current profession ==
Topluoğlu was sports journalist at a local newspaper and sports commentator at a local radio station between 2003 and 2004. Later, she was appointed to the club staff of Gürpınarspor, a position she held until 2009.

Currently, she serves as sports advisor to the mayor of Beylikdüzü district in Istanbul.

== Honours ==
=== Clubs ===
Dinasuspor

- Champions (4): 1993–94, 1994–954, 1995–96, 1996–97

Delta Mobilyaspor

- Champions (1): 1999–2000

=== Individual ===
- Fair Play Award 1995–96

== See also ==
- Turkish women in sports
