= Nazan Bulut =

Turkish former women's footballer

Personal information
- Date of birth: 24 May 1973 (age 53)
- Place of birth: Akçalören, İvrindi, Balıkesir, Turkey

Senior career*
Years	Team	Apps	(Gls)
1995–1997	Gürtaşspor		
1997	Dinarsuspor		

International career
1995–1996	Turkey	7	(1)
- * Club domestic league appearances and goals

Nazan Bulut (born 24 May 1973) is a Turkish former women's footballer. She was a member of the Turkey women's national team. She is a teacher for physical education.

Nazan Bulut was born at Akçalören village of İvrindi district in Balıkesir Province, western Turkey on 24 May 1973.

She serves as a teacher for physical education in the special education and rehabilitation center in Çamlık, Denizli (Turkish: Denizli Çamlık Özel Eğitim Merkezi).

== Playing career ==
=== Club ===
Bulut began her football playing career in the Ankara-based club Gürtaşspor on 30 March 1995. In the second half of the 1996–97 season, she transferred to Dinarsuspor in Istanbul.

=== International ===
Bulut was admitted to the Turkey women's team, and debuted in the friendly match against Romania on 8 September 1995. She played in five matches of the UEFA Women's Euro 1997 qualification – Group 8 against Hungary, Bulgaria and Ukraine in 1995 and 1996. She scored the only goal of Turkey in the match against Hungary on 9 May 1996. She capped seven times for the Turkey national team.
