= Cecile Carnol =

Belgian footballer (born 1977)

Personal information
- Date of birth: 10 March 1977 (age 49)
- Position: Forward

Senior career*
| Years | Team | Apps | (Gls) |
| 1993–2006 | Standard Fémina de Liège | | |

International career
| 1996–2003 | Belgium | 37 | (12) |
- * Club domestic league appearances and goals

Cecile Carnol (born 10 March 1977) is a retired Belgian football player who played as a forward for Standard Fémina de Liège and the Belgium women's national team.
