= Heidi Johansen =

Heidi Johansen may refer to:

- Heidi Johansen (footballer)
- Heidi Johansen (handballer)

== See also ==
- Heidi Johansen-Berg, professor of cognitive neuroscience
