= Dilan Deniz Gökçek =

Turkish football referee

Dilan Deniz Gökçek İşcan
- Born: January 1, 1976 (age 50)
- Other occupation: Sports instructor

Domestic
| Years | League | Role |
| 1998– | A2 Ligi | assistant referee |
| 1999–present | TFF Third League | referee |
| 2001– | A2 Ligi | referee |
| 2008–present | TFF Second League | referee |
| 2001–present | Turkish Women's First Football League | referee |

International
| Years | League | Role |
| 2012–present | UEFA Women's U-19 Championship | referee |
| 2013–present | FIFA Women's World Cup | referee |

Dilan Deniz Gökçek İşcan (born 1976) is a Turkish referee and sports instructor from profession. She is a FIFA listed woman referee since 2005.

Gökçek's interest in football began through her elder brother. Six sisters used to watch all football matches with their elder brother, and listen to his comments. Her elder sister Kadriye Gökçek decided to become a football referee inspired by the Turkish woman football referees Lale Orta and Hilal Tuba Tosun Ayer. Dilan Deniz followed the footsteps of Kadriye as her sister attended a referee course. Her parents objected in beginning because this occupation is not coupled with social security. After she completed her studies for physical education at Marmara University, she pursued a profession as sports instructor.

Dilan Deniz Gökçek began her career as an assistant referee on February 8, 1998, in the A2 Ligi. After one year of serving as an assistant referee in the TFF Third League, she qualified to supervise matches as referee in that league on April 4, 1999. Since then, she serves in various levels of competitions.

Gökçek received the FIFA badge in 2005. As of 2013, she is the country's one of the four international woman referees. In 2012, Gölçek oversaw the 2013 UEFA Women's U-19 Championship First qualifying round matches of Austria against Greece on October 20 and Italy against Austria on October 25 in Gloggnitz, Austria. Gökçek supervised the knockout stage match between the Norwegian Røa IL and the Kazakh BIIK Kazygurt at the 2012–13 UEFA Women's Champions League on October 4, 2012, in Oslo, Norway. At the 2013 UEFA Women's U-19 Championship held in Wales, she officiated the preliminary matches Sweden against Finland in Llanelli on August 19 and Wales against England in Carmarthen on August 22. Gökçek oversaw the Group 4 match between Scotland and Bosnia and Herzegovina at 2015 FIFA Women's World Cup qualification in Motherwell, Scotland on September 26, 2013.

She served in the men's football Süper Lig's 2015–16 season match Beşiktaş J.K. vs Kasımpaşa S.K. as the fourth official.
