= Mette Jokumsen =

Danish footballer (born 1977)

Personal information
- Date of birth: 11 February 1977 (age 49)
- Position: Forward

Senior career*
Years	Team	Apps	(Gls)
- IK Skovbakken

International career
	Denmark	44	
- * Club domestic league appearances and goals

Mette Jokumsen (born 11 February 1977) is a Danish retired midfielder who played for IK Skovbakken and the Danish national team.

== International career ==
Jokumsen was also part of the Danish team at the 2001 European Championships.
