= Gitte Krogh =

Danish footballer (born 1977)

Personal information
- Date of birth: 13 May 1977 (age 49)
- Place of birth: Horsens, Denmark
- Height: 5 ft 7 in (1.70 m)
- Position: Forward

Youth career
- Stensballe IK

Senior career*
Years	Team	Apps	(Gls)
1994–1998	HEI		
1998–2001	OB		

International career
1994–2001	Denmark	90	(46)
- * Club domestic league appearances and goals

Gitte Krogh (born 13 May 1977) is a Danish former football forward. She was part of the Denmark women's national football team.

She competed at the 1996 Summer Olympics, playing three matches.

After playing for Denmark in their 1–0 UEFA Women's Euro 2001 semi-final defeat by Sweden, Krogh made a shock retirement from football at the age of 24.

== International career ==
Krogh made her debut for the senior Denmark team as a 17-year-old, in a 1–0 friendly defeat by the Netherlands in Hoogezand on 14 September 1994. She scored three goals at the 1995 FIFA Women's World Cup, and a tournament preview of the 1999 FIFA Women's World Cup on the SoccerTimes.com website described her as a "top striker".

== See also ==
- Denmark at the 1996 Summer Olympics
