= Lale Orta =

Turkish football referee (born 1960)

- Born: 1 April 1960 (age 66); Gümüşhane, Turkey
- Other occupation: University lecturer

Domestic
Years	League	Role
1990–98	A2 Ligi	referee
1990-04	TFF Third League	referee
1996-04	TFF Second League	referee
1996-04	TFF First League	referee
1997-01	Turkish Cup	referee
1999-04	Süper Lig	referee
2000–02	Women's First League	referee

International
Years	League	Role
2002–07	UEFA Women's Champions League	referee

Lale Orta (born 1 April 1960) is a Turkish former football player, coach, sports commentator and referee. She was Turkey's first ever FIFA listed woman referee. Currently, she is an academic in the field of sports science. End January 2023, she was appointed chairperson of the Central Referee Committee of the Turkish Football Federation.

== Personal life ==
Lale Orta was born 1960 in Istanbul. Following her primary and secondary education in schools at Aksaray, Cibali and Bakırköy, she studied Accounting and Finance at Marmara University graduating in 1986. She continued her higher education in Sport management at the same university and earned a Master's degree in 1993. She received a PhD degree with a thesis on "Football Organizations in Turkey and the World - An Analytical Approach" (Turkish: "Dünyada ve Türkiye'de Futbol Organizasyonları - Analitik bir Yaklaşım") at her alma mater in 2002.

Between 1998 and 2003, Orta served as lecturer at the Istanbul Technical University. From 2003 to 2009, she taught at Çanakkale Onsekiz Mart University. Since then she has been employed by Okan University in Istanbul, first as an assistant professor and as an associate professor starting in 2015, and has acted as the head of the Department of Sports Management between 2009-2011 and 2015 onwards.

Lale Orta is married to film and stage actor Ahmet Orta.

== Sports career ==
=== Player and coach ===
Between 1976 and 1989, she played football as goalkeeper in Dostluk Spor, the first women's football team of Turkey, and served as its captain. She became later the country's first female certified football coach, and worked as such for Dostluk Spor and the Turkey women's national football team.

=== Referee ===
Orta began her referee career as an assistant referee in a match of the Turkish reserve team league, called A2 Ligi, on 10 September 1990. She made her debut as a referee in the same league on 7 October 1990. She was then promoted to officiate in the TFF Third League on 27 October 1990, and in the TFF Second League on 28 January 1996. Orta was appointed to supervise the highest-level Turkish league competitions in the Süper Lig for the first time in the match Sakaryaspor against MKE Ankaragücü on 29 May 1999. She served as referee in the Turkish Women's First Football League debuting on 9 April 2000. After officiating more than 1,500 amateur and professional football matches including 60 international in various competitions, she retired from active referee career in domestic football after her last match on 5 December 2004. The Turkish Football Federation named her official observer for the Super Lig matches with effect of the 2007–08 season.

In 1995, she received the FIFA badge as one of the first 54 women referees from 27 countries in the world. In this capacity, she officiated international matches in eleven years. Orta was named a "UEFA Elite Referee" among 17 European referees in 2003. On 28 November 2002 Orta supervised the quarter-finals match between Arsenal Ladies and CSK VVS Samara at the 2002–03 UEFA Women's Cup held in St Albans England. She oversaw the preliminary round match between Russia and France at the 2005 UEFA Women's Championship qualification in Moscow, Russia on 16 May 2004 and the final match of 2005 UEFA Women's Cup between the German 1. FFC Turbine Potsdam and the Swedish Djurgården/Älvsjö on 15 May 2005. Due to 45-years of age limit for referees set by the FIFA, Orta's international referee career ended after the 2007 FIFA Women's World Cup qualification (UEFA) match she officiated between the national women's teams of Spain and Belgium played in Madrid, Spain on 5 November 2005. For the 2007–08 UEFA Women's Cup semi-final second-leg match between the Italian A.S.D. C.F. Bardolino Verona and the German 1. FFC Frankfurt teams played in Verona, Italy on 5 April 2008, she served as the official observer.

== Sports administrator ==
Orta was appointed chairperson of the Central Referee Committee (Turkish: Merkez Hakem Kurulu, MHK) of the Turkish Football Federation on 29 January 2023.

== Honors ==
- 26 March 2002 IOC trophy "Women and Sport in Europe"
- 2003 UEFA Elite Referee
