= Dostluk S.K. =

Multi-sport club in Istanbul, Turkey

Dostluk Spor
- Full name: Dostluk Spor Kulübü
- Founded: April 19, 1973; 53 years ago
- Based in: Bakırköy, Istanbul, Turkey
- Colors
- President: Mahmut Güngör
- Branches: Basketball, swimming, tennis and volleyball
- Motto: Dostluk Kazansın (May Friendship Win)
- Website: www.dostlukspor.com

Dostluk Spor Kulübü is a multi-sport club established 1973 as a women's football club in Istanbul, Turkey. It is known as the country's first ever women's football club. The club also maintains the branches of basketball, swimming, tennis and volleyball to its activities. The club's colors are orange and black. "Dostluk" is the Turkish word for "Friendship".

Dostluk Spor was founded by a group of young women with the slogan "We can do it as good as men do." at the Moda neighborhood of Kadıköy district in Istanbul on April 19, 1973. The club was preceded by the Istanbul Kız Futbol Takımı (Istanbul Girls' Football Team), which was formed by 13 women with the personal initiative of Haluk Hekimoğlu in 1971. The club's success initiated soon the establishment of other women's football teams in İstanbul, İzmir and Ankara. Dostluk Spor women's football team became runner-up in the 1999–2000 season of the Turkish Women's First Football League.

After existing many years as a women's football club only, the club extended its sport activities to basketball, swimming, tennis and volleyball in 1999. Currently, the club is based in Bakırköy district of Istanbul.

Dostluk Spor fostered many sportspeople, who transferred later to major clubs. Doğukan Sönmez of Galatasaray men's basketball is one of them, who began his career in Dostluk Spor. A notable member of the club is Lale Orta, who played football as a goalkeeper and captain from 1976 to 1989 in the women's team, served later as a trainer and then became Turkey's first ever female football referee. Between 2002 and 2007, she officiated international women's football competitions with FIFA badge.

== See also ==
- Turkish women in sports
