= Maltepe Yalıspor =

Maltepe Yalıspor Yalıspor
- Full name: Maltepe Yalı Spor Kulübü
- Chairman: Ali Kaya

Maltepe Yalıspor, shortly Yalıspor, is the women's football team of the club located in Maltepe district of Istanbul, Turkey.

== History ==
Yalıspor played in the 2007–08 season in the Women's League. With the establishment of two leagues in 2008, they were admitted to the Turkish Women's First Football League. However, at the end of the season, Yalıspor was relegated to the Second League. Competed in the Second League in the 2009–10 season, they were promoted to the First League. The team played lastly in the First League in the 2010–11 season. They became latest with only victory, and were relegated again to the Second League, however, the women's football team dissolved.
