= Turkey women's national football team results =

Below are the Turkey women's national football team all time results:

Win Draw Loss

== Best / worst results ==
=== Best ===
As of 25 March 2022

Number	Year	Opponent	Result
1	2006	Georgia	9–0
2	2019	Luxembourg	9–1
3	1998	Israel	8–0
4	2008	Estonia	6–0
5	2015	Georgia	6–0
6	2008	Latvia	5–0
7	2018	Georgia	5–0
8	1999	Bosnia and Herzegovina	6–2
9	2001	Bosnia and Herzegovina	5–1
10	2010	Malta	5–1
11	2009	Georgia	4–0
12	2009	North Macedonia	4–0
13	2020	Estonia	4–0
14	1998	Israel	5–2
15	2011	Greece	4–1
16	2021	Albania	4–1
17–21		5 times	3–0
22–25		4 times	4–2
26–29		4 times	3–1

=== Worst ===
As of 25 March 2022

Number	Year	Opponent	Result
1	1999	Germany	1–12
2	2012	Germany	0–10
3	2011	Spain	1–10
4	1995	Romania	0–8
5	2013	England	0–8
6	2014	Ukraine	0–8
7	2019	Netherlands	0–8
8	2021	Germany	0–8
9	1996	Romania	1–8
10	2015	Germany	0–7
11	1999	Hungary	2–8
12	1995	Hungary	0–6
13	2000	Hungary	0–6
14	2001	Romania	0–6
15	2016	Germany	0–6
16	1996	Romania	1–6
17	2019	Slovenia	1–6
18	1997	Yugoslavia	0–5
19	2009	Spain	0–5
20	2012	Germany	0–5
21	2012	Switzerland	0–5
22	1997	Estonia	1–5
23	2002	Belarus	1–5
24	2010	Spain	1–5
25	2014	Wales	1–5
26–33		8 times	0–4
34	2022	Serbia	2–5
35–37		3 times	1–4
38–46		9 times	0–3
47	2020	Russia	2–4
48–50		3 times	1–3

== Main results ==
As of 24 March 2022

Tournament	Pld	W	D	L	GF	GA	Dif	Pts
FIFA World Cup Qualification	41	12	4	25	58	117	–59	40
UEFA European Championship Qualification	43	6	5	32	41	143	–101	23
Total	84	18	9	57	99	260	–161	63

== Minor Results ==
- 1998 Harvest Cup
- 2007 UEFA Women's Support International Tournament
- 2008 Women's Support International Tournament
- 2008 UEFA Women's Support International Tournament
- 2009 Women's Support International Tournament
- 2017 Goldcity Women's Cup
- Friendly

== 1995–99 ==
=== 1995 ===
8 September 1995 Friendly	Turkey	0–8	Romania	(Turkey) Fenerbahçe Stadium, Istanbul
16:00		(Report)		Referee: (Turkey) Lale Orta

10 September 1995 Friendly	Turkey	0–1	Romania	(Turkey) Zeytinburnu Stadium, Istanbul
14:30		(Report)		Referee: (Turkey) Gürkan Gürakan

4 October 1995 EURO W. '97 Q.	Hungary	6–0	Turkey	(Hungary) Széktói Stadion, Kecskemét
14:00		(Report)		Referee: (Czech Republic) Pavlin Jirku

21 October 1995 EURO W. '97 Q.	Turkey	0–4	Bulgaria	(Turkey) Yusuf Ziya Öniş Stadium, Istanbul
14:30		(Report)		Referee: (Israel) Haim Lipkovitch

=== 1996 ===
14 April 1996 EURO W. '97 Q.	Ukraine	3–0	Turkey	(Ukraine) Shakhtar Stadium, Donetsk
16:00		(Report)		Referee: (Latvia) Romans Lajuks

9 May 1996 EURO W. '97 Q.	Turkey	1–2	Hungary	(Turkey) Şenlikköy Stadium, Istanbul
15:30	Bulut 73'	(Report)		Referee: (Israel) Dani Koren

5 June 1996 Friendly	Romania	6–1	Turkey	(Romania) Minerul Filipesti De Padure, Lupeni
17:00		(Report)	Kılıç 36'	Referee: (Romania) Valeriv Idnita

7 June 1996 Friendly	Romania	8–1	Turkey	(Romania) Minerul Filipesti De Padure, Lupeni
17:30		(Report)	Demirci 50'	Referee: (Romania) Stoico Adrian

16 June 1996 EURO W. '97 Q.	Bulgaria	3–0	Turkey	Bulgaria
		(Report)		Referee: (Russia) Serguei Anokhine

24 August 1996 EURO W. '97 Q.	Turkey	0–3	Ukraine	(Turkey) Zeytinburnu Stadium, Istanbul
17:00		(Report)		Referee: (Azerbaijan) Asim Khudiev

=== 1997 ===
30 August 1997 Friendly	Estonia	5–1	Turkey	(Estonia) Kehtna Stadium, Rapla County
18:00		(Report)		Referee: (Estonia) Margus Kotter

25 September 1997 1999 WWC Q.	Georgia	0–1	Turkey	(Georgia (country)) Metallurgi Stadium, Rustavi
16:00		(Report)	Akgün 89'	Referee: (Romania) Maria Petrescu

30 October 1997 1999 WWC Q.	Turkey	0–5	FR Yugoslavia	(Turkey) Sakarya Atatürk Stadium, Sakarya
14:00		(Report)		Referee: (Wales) Raymond Ellingham

23 November 1997 1999 WWC Q.	Bulgaria	1–2	Turkey	(Bulgaria) Stadion Balgarska Armia, Sofia
14:30		(Report)	Gündüz 13', 25'	Referee: (Poland) Marek Wygraniec Jwona

17 December 1997 1999 WWC Q.	Turkey	1–1	Greece	(Turkey) Vefa Stadium, Istanbul
14:00	Kılıç 30'	(Report)		Referee: (Albania) Yevi Kollari

=== 1998 ===
9 February 1998 Friendly	Israel	2–5	Turkey	(Israel) Wingate Institute, Netanya
14:30		(Report)	Akgün 3' Eryurt 17', 80', 88' Gündüz 71'	Referee: (Israel) Lilach Asolin

11 February 1998 Friendly	Israel	0–8	Turkey	(Israel) Wingate Institute, Netanya
14:30		(Report)	Gündüz 6', 17' Eryurt 15', 58', 88'; Demircan 20', 40'; Yükseloğlu 48'	Referee: (Israel) Lilach Asolin

8 March 1998 1999 WWC Q.	Greece	3–2	Turkey	(Greece) Kalamaria Stadium, Thessaloniki
14:00	Turan 15' (o.g.)	(Report)	Gündüz 30' Eryurt 40'	Referee: (Netherlands) Regina Belksma-Konink

20 May 1998 1999 WWC Q.	FR Yugoslavia	4–0	Turkey	(Federal Republic of Yugoslavia) Stadion Milan Sredanović, Kula
16:00		(Report)		Referee: (Switzerland) Nicole Petignat

20 June 1998 1999 WWC Q.	Turkey	1–1	Bulgaria	(Turkey) Namık Kemal Stadium, Tekirdağ
16:30	Eryurt 10'	(Report)		Referee: Gunthener Elka

29 July 1998 Harvest Cup	Turkey	0–1	Austria	(Slovakia) Štadión Sihoť, Trenčín
15:30		(Report)		Referee: (Slovakia) Bezak

30 July 1998 Harvest Cup	Turkey	0–4	Slovakia	(Slovakia) Dubnica nad Váhom
17:30		(Report)		Referee: (Slovakia) Miloš Kopča

1 August 1998 Harvest Cup	Turkey	3–0	Israel	(Slovakia) Liptovský Mikuláš
17:00	Altındere 8' Eryurt 48' Öz 83'	(Report)		Referee: (Slovakia) Miroslav Jaska

=== 1999 ===
14 February 1999 Friendly	Turkey	1–12	Germany	(Turkey) Boğaziçi Stadium, Istanbul
13:30	Aldırmaz 78'	(Report)		Referee: (Turkey) Lale Orta

1 July 1999 Friendly	Turkey	3–1	Israel	(Turkey) Şenlikköy Stadium, Istanbul
17:00	Gündüz 45' Eryurt 47'	(Report)		Referee: (Turkey) Yaşar Filiz

3 July 1999 Friendly	Turkey	2–0	Israel	(Turkey) Vefa Stadium, Istanbul
18:00	Bakır 56' Çakmak 67'	(Report)		Referee: (Turkey) Levent Yardımcı

24 July 1999 EURO W. 2001 Q.	Bosnia and Herzegovina	2–6	Turkey	(Bosnia and Herzegovina) Gradski Stadion, Velika Kladuša
17:30		(Report)	Gündüz 11' Eryurt 30', 40' Yükseloğlu 50' Çakmak 87' Bakır 88'	Referee: (Italy) Marta Atzori

3 November 1999 EURO W. 2001 Q.	Turkey	2–8	Hungary	(Turkey) Alsancak Stadium, İzmir
14:00	Çakmak 22', 64'	(Report)		Referee: (Israel) Lilach Asolin

18 December 1999 EURO W. 2001 Q.	Greece	0–0	Turkey	(Greece) Municipal Stadium, Karditsa
		(Report)		Referee: (Switzerland) Nicole Petignat

== 2000–09 ==
=== 2000 ===
16 February 2000 EURO W. 2001 Q.	Turkey	3–1	Bosnia and Herzegovina	(Turkey) Vefa Stadium, Istanbul
13:30	Eryurt 53', 57' Demirci 66'	(Report)		Referee: (Bulgaria) Galina Doneva

26 April 2000 EURO W. 2001 Q.	Hungary	6–0	Turkey	(Hungary) Széktói Stadion, Kecskemét
16:00		(Report)		Referee: (Norway) Bente Ovedie Skogvang

13 May 2000 EURO W. 2001 Q.	Turkey	2–3	Greece	(Turkey) 19 Mayis Stadium, Ankara
16:00	Gündüz 19', 63'	(Report)	Su 32' (o.g.)	Referee: (Germany) Antje Witteweg

=== 2001 ===
20 May 2001 Friendly	Greece	1–0	Turkey
16:30		(Report)

12 August 2001 Friendly	Romania	6–0	Turkey
18:00		(Report)

14 August 2001 Friendly	Romania	1–0	Turkey
16:30		(Report)

28 September 2001 2003 WWC Q.	Belarus	4–0	Turkey	(Belarus) Spartak Stadium, Mogilev
17:00		(Report)

13 October 2001 2003 WWC Q.	Turkey	0–3	Slovakia	(Turkey) Şenlikköy Stadium, Istanbul
15:00		(Report)

27 October 2001 2003 WWC Q.	Turkey	5–1	Bosnia and Herzegovina	(Turkey) Zeytinburnu Stadium, Istanbul
15:00	Eryurt 19', 59' Altındere 39', 42' Defterli 46'	(Report)

21 November 2001 2003 WWC Q.	Turkey	1–4	Hungary	(Turkey) Şenlikköy Stadium, Istanbul
13:00	Defterli 55'	(Report)

=== 2002 ===
27 February 2002 Friendly	Turkey	1–0	Romania	(Turkey) TFF Riva Facility, Istanbul
13:00	Eryurt 25'	(Report)		Referee: (Turkey) Neslihan Bayraktar

1 March 2002 Friendly	Turkey	0–1	Romania	(Turkey) TFF Riva Facility, Istanbul
13:00		(Report)		Referee: (Turkey) Dilan Deniz Gökçek

24 March 2002 2003 WWC Q.	Turkey	1–5	Belarus	(Turkey) Vefa Stadium, Istanbul
13:00	Gündüz 70'	(Report)

5 April 2002 2003 WWC Q.	Slovakia	3–0	Turkey	(Slovakia) Stadium ŠKP Inter Dúbravka, Dúbravka
15:30		(Report)

2 May 2002 2003 WWC Q.	Bosnia and Herzegovina	3–2	Turkey	(Bosnia and Herzegovina) Gradski stadion, Prijedor
17:00		(Report)	Gündüz 41' Defterli 76'	Referee: (Romania) Cristina Dorcioman

23 May 2002 2003 WWC Q.	Hungary	4–1	Turkey	(Hungary) Szusza Ferenc Stadion, Újpest
16:30		(Report)	Eryurt 75'	Referee: (Croatia) Snjezana Focic

=== 2003–05 ===
Women football leagues, governed by the Turkish Football Federation, were not held in the seasons 2003–04, 2004–05 and 2005–06. Consequently, no women's national team were formed, and Turkey's participation at international competitions did not take place.

=== 2006 ===
18 November 2006 EURO W. 2009 Q.	Turkey	1–0	Northern Ireland	(Turkey) Tevfik Sırrı Gür Stadium, Mersin
13:30	Erol 85'	(Report)		Referee: (Sweden) Lena Arwedahl

20 November 2006 EURO W. 2009 Q.	Turkey	1–2	Croatia	(Turkey) Burhanettin Kocamaz Stadium, Mersin
13:30	Özgüvenç 3'	(Report)		Referee: (Ukraine) Tetiana Aseeva

23 November 2006 EURO W. 2009 Q.	Turkey	9–0	Georgia	(Turkey) 5 Ocak Stadium, Adana
13:30	Şeker 39', 51' Defterli 41', 62' Yağ 52' Ercimen 55' Kıraç 60' Uraz 76', 90'	(Report)		Referee: (Switzerland) Esther Staubli

=== 2007 ===
4 November 2007 UEFA Women's Support International Tournament	Bulgaria	2–2	Turkey	(Turkey) Buca Stadium, İzmir
14:00		(Report)	Özgüvenç 13' Düner 82'	Referee: (Azerbaijan) Venere Muradova

8 November 2007 UEFA Women's Support International Tournament	Turkey	4–2	Azerbaijan	(Turkey) Buca Stadium, İzmir
14:00	Defterli 50' Şeker 57' Özgüvenç 76', 90'	(Report)		Referee: (Azerbaijan) Venere Muradova

=== 2008 ===
27 June 2008 UEFA Women's Support International Tournament	Estonia	0–6	Turkey	(Estonia) Paide linnastaadion, Paide
18:30		(Report)	Defterli 30', 38' İnan 44' Erol 80' Yaren 82' Gelirli 87'	Referee: (Belarus) Irina Turovskaya

29 June 2008 UEFA Women's Support International Tournament	Turkey	4–2	Croatia	(Estonia) Rakvere Linnastaadion, Rakvere
17:00	Yaren 21', 49' Defterli 56', 73'	(Report)		Referee: (Finland) Ivana Zukovski

2 July 2008 UEFA Women's Support International Tournament	Malta	0–3	Turkey	(Estonia) Rakvere Linnastaadion, Rakvere
14:00		(Report)	Erol 49', 62' Düner 56'	Referee: (Poland) Monika Mularczyk

15 December 2008 UEFA Women's Support International Tournament	Turkey	2–2	Croatia	(Turkey) Atatürk Stadium, Sakarya
13:30	Şeker 28' Kıraç 90'	(Report)		Referee: (Hungary) Katalin Kulcsár

19 December 2008 UEFA Women's Support International Tournament	Latvia	0–5	Turkey	(Turkey) İsmetpaşa Stadium, Kocaeli
13:30		(Report)	Kıraç 4' Şeker 8', 19' Defterli 48' Gelirli 88'	Referee: (Hungary) Katalin Kulcsár

=== 2009 ===
11 May 2009 UEFA Women's Support International Tournament	Turkey	1–0	Azerbaijan	(Georgia (country)) Mikheil Meskhi Stadium, Tbilisi
16:00	Elgalp 2'	(Report)		Referee: (Slovenia) Tanja Subotič

13 May 2009 UEFA Women's Support International Tournament	Turkey	4–0	Georgia	(Georgia (country)) Poladi Stadium, Rustavi
16:00	Şeker 16', 34' Ersoy 58' Kara 72'	(Report)		Referee: (Slovenia) Tanja Subotič

16 May 2009 UEFA Women's Support International Tournament	Turkey	4–0	Macedonia	(Georgia (country)) Mikheil Meskhi Stadium, Tbilisi
16:00	Defterli 34' Şeker 52', 90' İnan 76'	(Report)

21 November 2009 2011 WWC Q.	Turkey	0–5	Spain	(Turkey) 19 Mayıs Stadium, Manisa
14:00		(Report)		Referee: (Bulgaria) Aneliya Sinabova

26 November 2009 2011 WWC Q.	Turkey	0–3	England	(Turkey) Buca Arena, İzmir
14:00		(Report)		Referee: (Portugal) Sandra Braz Bastos

== 2010–19 ==
=== 2010 ===
27 March 2010 2011 WWC Q.	Turkey	2–0	Malta	(Malta) Centenary Stadium, Ta' Qali
16:30	Uraz 21', 56'	(Report)		Referee: (Russia) Irina Tereshchenko

7 April 2010 2011 WWC Q.	Turkey	1–5	Spain	(Spain) Estadio Pedro Escartín, Guadalajara
15:00	Elgalp 55'	(Report)		Referee: (Slovakia) Zuzana Kováčová

11 April 2010 2011 WWC Q.	Turkey	5–1	Malta	(Turkey) Hüseyin Avni Aker Stadium, Trabzon
14:30	Yağ 6', 40' Uraz 38', 60' Defterli 44'	(Report)		Referee: (Belarus) Irina Turovskaya

23 June 2010 2011 WWC Q.	Austria	4–0	Turkey	(Austria) Anger Stadium, Anger
18:30		(Report)		Referee: (Serbia) Gordana Kuzmanović

29 July 2010 2011 WWC Q.	England	3–0	Turkey	(England) Bescot Stadium, Walsall
21:00		(Report)		Referee: (Romania) Floarea Babadac-Ionescu

25 August 2010 2011 WWC Q.	Turkey	2–2	Austria	(Turkey) 19 Mayıs Stadium, Samsun
19:00	Defterli 21' Yağ 50'	(Report)		Referee: (Hungary) Katalin Kulcsar

=== 2011 ===
27 April 2011 Friendly	Turkey	1–1	Greece	(Turkey) Bolu Atatürk Stadium, Bolu
14:00	Erol 89'	(Report)

29 April 2011 Friendly	Turkey	4–1	Greece	(Turkey) Bolu Atatürk Stadium, Bolu
14:00	Defterli 32' Kocaçınar 57', 61' Erol 76'	(Report)		Referee: (Turkey) Kadriye Gökçek

23 August 2011 Friendly	Portugal	2–0	Turkey	(Portugal) Complexo Desportivo das Caldas da Rainha, Caldas da Rainha
17:00		(Report)		Referee: (Portugal) Berta Tavares

25 August 2011 Friendly	Portugal	2–1	Turkey	(Portugal) Estádio Municipal de Rio Maior, Rio Maior
17:00		(Report)	Güngör 76'	Referee: (Portugal) Sandra Braz

17 September 2011 EURO W. 2013 Q.	Turkey	1–10	Spain	(Turkey) Recep Tayyip Erdoğan Stadium, Istanbul
19:00	Güngör 20'	(Report)		Referee: (Austria) Tanja Schett

22 September 2011 EURO W. 2013 Q.	Kazakhstan	2–0	Turkey	(Kazakhstan) Kazhymukan Munaitpasov Stadium, Shymkent
14:00		(Report)		Referee: (Slovakia) Petra Chudá

22 October 2011 EURO W. 2013 Q.	Turkey	0–0	Kazakhstan	(Turkey) Burhanettin Kocamaz Stadium, Tarsus
14:00		(Report)		Referee: (Belgium) Leen Martens

27 October 2011 EURO W. 2013 Q.	Romania	7–1	Turkey	(Romania) Stadionul Mogoșoaia, Bucharest
17:00		(Report)	Defterli 45'	Referee: (Bulgaria) Donka Jeleva-Terzieva

23 November 2011 EURO W. 2013 Q.	Turkey	1–2	Romania	(Turkey) Buca Arena, İzmir
14:00		(Report)		Referee: (Poland) Karolina Radzik-Johan

=== 2012 ===
15 February 2012 EURO W. 2013 Q.	Turkey	0–5	Germany	(Turkey) Buca Arena, İzmir
16:00		(Report)		Referee: (Serbia) Gordana Kuzmanović

31 March 2012 EURO W. 2013 Q.	Switzerland	5–0	Turkey	(Switzerland) Stadion Brügglifeld, Aarau
19:00		(Report)		Referee: (Russia) Marina Mamaeva

21 June 2012 EURO W. 2013 Q.	Spain	4–0	Turkey	(Spain) La Ciudad del Fútbol, Madrid
12:30	Kıraç 85' (o.g.)	(Report)		Referee: (Republic of Ireland) Rhona Daly

15 September 2012 EURO W. 2013 Q.	Turkey	1–3	Switzerland	(Turkey) Atatürk Olympic Stadium, Istanbul
18:00	Uraz 27'	(Report)		Referee: (Latvia) Ginta Pēce

19 September 2012 EURO W. 2013 Q.	Germany	10–0	Turkey	(Germany) MSV-Arena, Duisburg
18:00		(Report)		Referee: (Russia) Natalia Avdonchenko

=== 2013 ===
26 September 2013 2015 WWC Q.	England	8–0	Turkey	(England) Fratton Park, Portsmouth
21:05		(Report)		Referee: (Czech Republic) Olga Zadinová

31 October 2013 2015 WWC Q.	Turkey	0–4	England	(Turkey) Adana 5 Ocak Stadium, Adana
17:00		(Report)		Referee: (Kazakhstan) Yuliya Medvedeva-Keldyusheva

28 November 2013 2015 WWC Q.	Turkey	3–1	Montenegro	(Turkey) Buca Arena, İzmir
16:00	Çınar 11' Uraz 68' Topçu 75'	(Report)		Referee: (Belgium) Leen Martens

=== 2014 ===
13 February 2014 2015 WWC Q.	Turkey	0–1	Ukraine	(Turkey) Adana 5 Ocak Stadium, Adana
14:30		(Report)		Referee: (Serbia) Ana Minić

4 April 2014 2015 WWC Q.	Turkey	1–5	Wales	(Turkey) Eskişehir Atatürk Stadium, Eskişehir
15:00	Karabulut 89'	(Report)		Referee: (Bulgaria) Aneliya Sinabova

7 May 2014 2015 WWC Q.	Belarus	1–2	Turkey	(Belarus) Spartak Stadium, Mogilev
18:00		(Report)	Uraz 73' Kara 90'	Referee: (Slovakia) Zuzana Kováčová

14 June 2014 2015 WWC Q.	Wales	1–0	Turkey	(Wales) Bridge Meadow Stadium, Haverfordwest
15:00		(Report)		Referee: (Poland) Monika Mularczyk

19 June 2014 2015 WWC Q.	Montenegro	2–3	Turkey	(Montenegro) Stadion pod Malim brdom, Petrovac
17:00		(Report)	Duman 45' Uraz 58' Kara 80'	Referee: (France) Sabine Bonnin

13 September 2014 2015 WWC Q.	Ukraine	8–0	Turkey	(Ukraine) Arena Lviv, Lviv
18:00		(Report)		Referee: (Germany) Riem Hussein

17 September 2014 2015 WWC Q.	Turkey	3–0	Belarus	(Turkey) Minareliçavuş Spor Tesisleri, Bursa
15:00	Kara 40' Uraz 60', 69'	(Report)		Referee: (Denmark) Marianne Svendsen

=== 2015 ===
24 February 2015 Friendly	Turkey	4–2	Georgia	(Turkey) Rize Atatürk Stadium, Rize
14:00	Topçu 54' Erol 65' Uraz 83' Karabulut 90'	(Report)		Referee: (Turkey) Dilan Deniz Gökçek

26 February 2015 Friendly	Turkey	6–0	Georgia	(Turkey) Hüseyin Avni Aker Stadium, Trabzon
14:00	Karabulut 15' Uraz 17', 32', 46' Hız 75' Topçu 79'	(Report)		Referee: (Turkey) Dilek Koçbay

19 August 2015 Friendly	Albania	1–0	Turkey	(Albania) Elbasan Arena, Elbasan
18:00		(Report)

21 August 2015 Friendly	Albania	0–1	Turkey	(Albania) Elbasan Arena, Elbasan
18:00		(Report)	Topçu 76'

17 September 2015 EURO W. 2017 Q.	Turkey	1–4	Croatia	(Turkey) Kazım Karabekir Stadium, Erzurum
17:30	Uraz 17'	(Report)		Referee: (Malta) Esther Azzopardi

21 October 2015 EURO W. 2017 Q.	Hungary	1–0	Turkey	(Hungary) Ferencváros Stadion, Budapest
16:00		(Report)		Referee: (Sweden) Tess Petersson

25 October 2015 EURO W. 2017 Q.	Germany	7–0	Turkey	(Germany) BWT-Stadion am Hardtwald, Sandhausen
14:15		(Report)		Referee: (Republic of Ireland) Rhona Daly

25 November 2015 EURO W. 2017 Q.	Turkey	0–0	Russia	(Turkey) Fethiye Şehir Stadium, Fethiye
16:00		(Report)		Referee: (Portugal) Ana Aguiar

30 October 2015 EURO W. 2017 Q.	Croatia	3–0	Turkey	(Croatia) Stadion Rujevica, Rijeka
16:00		(Report)		Referee: (North Macedonia) Ivana Projkovska

=== 2016 ===
8 April 2016 EURO W. 2017 Q.	Turkey	0–6	Germany	(Turkey) Recep Tayyip Erdoğan Stadium, Istanbul
17:00		(Report)		Referee: (France) Florence Guillemin

2 June 2016 EURO W. 2017 Q.	Russia	2–0	Turkey	(Russia) Arena Khimki, Khimki
18:00		(Report)		Referee: (Netherlands) Vivian Peeters

6 June 2016 EURO W. 2017 Q.	Turkey	2–1	Hungary	(Turkey) Akdeniz University Stadium, Antalya
18:00	Türkoğlu 4'	(Report)		Referee: (Austria) Julia-Stefanie Baier

=== 2017 ===
1 March 2017 Goldcity Women's Cup	Turkey	1–3	Romania	(Turkey) Gold City Stadium, Antalya
17:30	Pekel 87'	(Report)		Referee: (Turkey) Neslihan Muratdağı

5 March 2017 Goldcity Women's Cup	Kosovo	2–4	Turkey	(Turkey) Gold City Stadium, Antalya
15:30		(Report)	Topçu 3' Çınar 63', 77' Altunkulak 73'	Referee: (Turkey) Melis Özçiğdem

7 March 2017 Goldcity Women's Cup	Poland	2–1	Turkey	(Turkey) Gold City Stadium, Antalya
15:30		(Report)	Pekel 36'	Referee: (Turkey) Neslihan Muratdağı

6 April 2017 2019 WWC Q.	Turkey	3–0	Montenegro	(Faroe Islands) Tórsvøllur, Tórshavn
17:00	Topçu 15', 39' Altunkulak 28'	(Report)		Referee: (Hungary) Eszter Urban

8 April 2017 2019 WWC Q.	Turkey	9–1	Luxembourg	(Faroe Islands) Tórsvøllur, Tórshavn
21:30	Topçu 10' Pekel 17', 51', 70' Altunkulak 57', 75', 86' Karagenç 90+3'	(Report)		Referee: (England) Sarah Garratt

11 April 2017 2019 WWC Q.	Faroe Islands	2–1	Turkey	(Faroe Islands) Tórsvøllur, Tórshavn
15:00		(Report)	Pekel 17'	Referee: (Hungary) Eszter Urban

27 November 2017 Friendly	Turkey	1–2	Jordan	(Turkey) TFF Riva Facility, Istanbul
11:00	Topçu 38'	(Report)		Referee: (Turkey) Neslihan Muratdağı

=== 2018 ===
4 April 2018 Friendly	Turkey	3–2	Estonia	(Turkey) TFF Riva Facility, Istanbul
16:00	Karabulut 19' Altunkulak 56', 88'	(Report)		Referee: (Turkey) Alper Ulusoy

7 April 2018 Friendly	Turkey	3–0	Estonia	(Turkey) TFF Riva Facility, Istanbul
13:00	Topçu 19' Altunkulak 56' Korkmaz 73'	(Report)		Referee: (Turkey) Neslihan Muratdağı

8 November 2018 Friendly	Georgia	0–2	Turkey	(Georgia (country)) Tbilisi
13:00		(Report)	Pekel 66' Topçu 89'	Referee: (Georgia (country)) Giorgi Vadatchkoria

11 November 2018 Friendly	Georgia	0–5	Turkey	(Georgia (country)) Tbilisi
13:00		(Report)	Cumert 3' Dişli 38' Karagenç 59' Hançar 86'	Referee: (Georgia (country)) Irakli Kvırıkashvili

=== 2019 ===
19 January 2019 Friendly	Turkey	0–0	Slovakia	(Turkey) Arslan Zeki Demirci Sports Complex, Antalya
14:00		(Report)		Referee: (Turkey) Neslihan Muratdağı

22 January 2019 Friendly	Turkey	1–1	Slovakia	(Turkey) Arslan Zeki Demirci Sports Complex, Antalya
14:00	Türkoğlu 21'	(Report)		Referee: (Turkey) Cansu Tiryaki

14 June 2019 Friendly	Moldova	0–2	Turkey	(Moldova) CSR Orhei, Orhei
19:00		(Report)	Hançar 45+2' Arhan 90+3'	Referee: (Moldova) Dumitru Munteanu

17 June 2019 Friendly	Moldova	0–0	Turkey	(Moldova) CSR Orhei, Orhei
19:00		(Report)		Referee: (Moldova) Dumitru Munteanu

30 August 2019 EURO W. 2022 Q.	Kosovo	2–0	Turkey	(Kosovo) Fadil Vokrri Stadium, Pristina
20:00		(Report)		Referee: (Norway) Emilie Dokset

3 September 2019 EURO W. 2022 Q.	Netherlands	3–0	Turkey	(Netherlands) Abe Lenstra Stadion, Heerenveen
20:00		(Report)		Referee: (Romania) Iuliana Demetrescu

4 October 2019 EURO W. 2022 Q.	Turkey	0–0	Estonia	(Turkey) Sancaktepe Stadium, Istanbul
16:00		(Report)		Referee: (Spain) Marta Frias Acedo

8 October 2019 EURO W. 2022 Q.	Turkey	1–6	Slovenia	(Turkey) Kocaeli Stadium, İzmit
16:00	Kara 89'	(Report)		Referee: (Portugal) Silvia Domingos

8 November 2019 EURO W. 2022 Q.	Turkey	0–8	Netherlands	(Turkey) Bornova Aziz Kocaoğlu Stadium, İzmir
19:00		(Report)		Referee: (Serbia) Jelena Cvetković

11 November 2019 Friendly	Turkey	0–4	Ukraine	(Turkey) Menemen Stadium, İzmir
16:00		(Report)		Referee: (Turkey) Melis Özçiğdem

== 2020–29 ==
=== 2020 ===
17 January 2020 Friendly	Malta	1–2	Turkey	Ta' Qali, Malta
15:00 UTC+3	Bugeja 38'	Report	Erol 28'; Hançar 64'	Stadium: Centenary Stadium; Referee: Trustin Farrugia Cann (Malta)

18 September 2020 UEFA Women's Euro 2022 qualifying Group A	Slovenia	3–1	Turkey	Kranj, Slovenia
20:00 UTC+3	Zver 28' (pen.); Prašnikar 41'; Kolbl 77'	Report	Hız 18'	Stadium: Stanko Mlakar Stadium; Referee: Emilie Dokset (Norway)

23 October 2020 UEFA Women's Euro 2022 qualifying Group A	Turkey	0–0	Kosovo	Manavgat, Turkey
19:00 UTC+3		Report		Stadium: Arslan Zeki Demirci Sports Complex; Referee: Stacey Pearson (England)

27 October 2020 UEFA Women's Euro 2022 qualifying Group A	Russia	4–2	Turkey	Moscow, Russia
17:00 UTC+3	Korovkina 13'; Chernomyrdina 22', 46'; Mashina 49'	Report	Arhan 76'; Karagenç 86'	Stadium: Sapsan Arena; Referee: Elvira Nurmustafina (Kazakhstan)

27 November 2020 UEFA Women's Euro 2022 qualifying Group A	Estonia	0–4	Turkey	Tallinn, Estonia
18:00 UTC+3		Report	Türkoğlu 29'; Civelek 55'; Hız 76'; Uraz 81'	Stadium: Sportsland; Referee: Volha Tsiareshka (Belarus)

1 December 2020 UEFA Women's Euro 2022 qualifying Group A	Turkey	1–2	Russia	Manavgat, Turkey
17:00 UTC+3	Arhan 55'	Report	Belomyttseva 28'; Fedorova 45+1'	Stadium: Arslan Zeki Demirci Sports Complex; Referee: Ewa Augustyn (Poland)

=== 2021 ===
14 June 2021 Friendly	Turkey	3–1	Bulgaria	Istanbul, Turkey
18:00 UTC+3	Uraz 23'; Cumert 25'; Karabulut 47'	Report	Popadinova 78'	Stadium: TFF Riva Facility; Referee: Melis Özçiğdem (Turkey)

12 July 2021 Friendly	Albania	1–2	Turkey	Elbasan, Albania
18:00 UTC+3	Curraj 4'	Report	Altıntaş 38'; Topçu 68'	Stadium: Elbasan Arena; Referee: Emanuela Rusta (Albania)

15 July 2021 Friendly	Albania	1–4	Turkey	Tirana, Albania
18:00 UTC+3	Doci 9'	Report	Tağ 16'; Türkoğlu 66'; Topçu 68'; Kuru 87'	Stadium: Selman Stërmasi Stadium; Referee: Mirela Cemeri (Albania)

16 September 2021 2023 FIFA Women's World Cup qualification – UEFA Group H	Turkey	1–1	Portugal	Alanya, Turkey
19:00 UTC+3	Uraz 29'	Report	Silva 58'	Stadium: Bahçeşehir Okulları Stadium; Referee: Maika Vanderstiche (France)

21 September 2021 Friendly	Ukraine	1–0	Turkey	Kyiv, Ukraine
19:00 UTC+3	Boychenko 12'	Report		Stadium: Bannikov Stadium; Referee: Denys Shurman (Ukraine)

21 October 2021 2023 FIFA Women's World Cup qualification – UEFA Group H	Turkey	1–0	Bulgaria	Istanbul, Turkey
18:00 UTC+3	Uraz 75'	Report		Stadium: Esenyurt Necmi Kadıoğlu Stadium; Referee: Jurgita Mačikunytė (Lithuania)

26 October 2021 2023 FIFA Women's World Cup qualification – UEFA Group H	Serbia	2–0	Turkey	Gornji Milanovac, Serbia
18:00 UTC+3	Stefanović 28'; Damjanović 54' (pen.)	Report		Stadium: Stadion Metalac; Referee: Katalin Sipos (Hungary)

26 November 2021 2023 FIFA Women's World Cup qualification – UEFA Group H	Germany	8–0	Turkey	Braunschweig, Germany
16:00 UTC+3	Tağ 1' (o.g.); Schüller 10', 11', 66'; Brand 62'; Freigang 74'; Nüsken 80'; Bühl 87'	Report		Stadium: Eintracht-Stadion; Referee: Aleksandra Česen (Slovenia)

30 November 2021 2023 FIFA Women's World Cup qualification – UEFA Group H	Turkey	3–2	Israel	Mersin, Turkey
18:00 UTC+3	Sadıkoğlu 70'; Taşkın 90+2'; Topçu 90+6' (pen.)	Report	Hazan 9'; Sofer 23'	Stadium: Mersin Arena; Referee: Justina Lavrenovaite (Lithuania)

=== 2022 ===
23 February 2022 2023 FIFA Women's World Cup qualification– UEFAGroup H	Turkey	2–5	Serbia	İzmir
--:--	Uraz 42'; Topçu 57' (pen.)	Report	Filipović 8', 72'; J. Damnjanović 12'; N. Damjanović 37'; Čanković 65'	Stadium: Gürsel Aksel Stadium; Referee: Deborah Anex (Switzerland)

7 April 2022 2023 FIFA Women's World Cup qualification– UEFAGroup H	Bulgaria	0–2	Turkey	Plovdiv
--:--		Report	Türkoğlu 41'; Topçu 88'	Stadium: Plovdiv Stadium; Referee: Tanja Račić (Bosnia and Herzegovina)

12 April 2022 2023 FIFA Women's World Cup qualification– UEFAGroup H	Israel	1–0	Turkey	Petah Tikva
--:--		Report		Stadium: HaMoshava Stadium; Referee: Ewa Augustyn (Poland)

25 June 2022 Friendly	Turkey	2–0	Azerbaijan	Istanbul
17:00	Türkoğlu 63'; Nigar 75' (o.g.)			Stadium: TFF Riva Facility; Referee: Ana Maria Terteleac (Romania)

28 June 2022 Friendly	Turkey	2–2	Azerbaijan	Istanbul
18:00	Acar 55' (o.g.); Topçu 90+1' (pen.)		Jafarzada 60'; Bakarandze 75'	Stadium: TFF Riva Facility; Referee: Ana Maria Terteleac (Romania)

3 September 2022 2023 FIFA Women's World Cup qualification– UEFAGroup H	Turkey	0–3	Germany	Bursa
--:--		Report	Rauch 57' (pen.); Bühl 59'; Schüller 77'	Stadium: Timsah Park; Referee: Maria Marotta (Italy)

6 September 2022 2023 FIFA Women's World Cup qualification– UEFAGroup H	Portugal	4–0	Turkey	Vizela
	Encarnação 33'; Nazareth 36'; Tağ 49' (o.g.); Faria 79'	Report (FIFA); Report (UEFA)		Stadium: Estádio do FC Vizela; Referee: Jana Adámková (Czech Republic)

12 November 2022 Friendly	Turkey	7–0	Jordan	İzmir, Turkey
--:-- UTC+3	Sadıkoğlu 7'; Topçu 29'; Uraz 46', 51'; Keskin 54'; Hançar 80'; Esen 90'

15 November 2022 Friendly	Turkey	5–0	Jordan	Manavgat, Turkey
16:00 UTC+3	Uraz 27'; Topçu 33'; Hançar 37'; Cin 55'; Keskin 90+2'	Report		Stadium: Emirhan Otel Spor Kompleksi 1 Nolu Saha

=== 2023 ===
15 February 2023 Turkish Women's Cup	Turkey	v	South Africa	Alanya, Turkey
				Stadium: Miracle Sport Complex

18 February 2023 Turkish Women's Cup	Venezuela	v	Turkey	Alanya, Turkey
				Stadium: Goldcity Sport Complex

21 February 2023 Turkish Women's Cup	Turkey	v	Slovenia	Alanya, Turkey
				Stadium: Goldcity Sport Complex

8 April 2023 Friendly	Turkey	1–0	Azerbaijan	Baku, Azerbaijan
16:00	Şeker 5'			Stadium: Dalga Arena; Referee: Teona Sturua (GEO)

11 April 2023 Friendly	Turkey	0–0	Azerbaijan	Baku, Azerbaijan
16:00				Stadium: Dalga Arena; Referee: Kristina Mariana Trandafir (ROM)

14 July 2023 Friendly	Estonia	0–3	Turkey	Tallinn, Estonia
				Stadium: TBC

17 July 2023 Friendly	Estonia	2–2	Turkey	Tallinn, Estonia
				Stadium: TBC

22 September 2023 2023–24 UEFA Nations League	Georgia	0–3	Turkey	Tbilisi, Georgia
16:00 (18:00 GET)		Report	Cin 5'; Sadikoğlu 41'; Uraz 71'	Stadium: Mikheil Meskhi Stadium; Attendance: 800; Referee: Audrey Gerbel (France)

26 September 2023 2023–24 UEFA Nations League	Turkey	2–0	Lithuania	Elazığ, Turkey
17:00 (18:00 TRT)	Sadıkoğlu 29'; Civelek 85'	Report		Stadium: Elazığ Atatürk Stadium; Referee: Rita Vehapi (Kosovo)

27 October 2023 2023–24 UEFA Women's Nations League	Luxembourg	0–4	Turkey	Esch-sur-Alzette, Luxembourg
19:30		Report	Sadıkoğlu 21', 45+2'; Topçu 52' (pen.); Karabulut 84'	Stadium: Stade Émile Mayrisch; Referee: Miriama Bočková (Slovakia)

31 October 2023 2023–24 UEFA Women's Nations League	Turkey	1–0	Luxembourg	Çorum, Turkey
17:00 (19:00 TRT)	Sadıkoğlu 14'	Report		Stadium: Çorum Sehir Stadi; Referee: Maral Mirzai Beni (Sweden)

1 December 2023 2023–24 UEFA Nations League	Lithuania	0–4	Turkey	Vilnius, Lithuania
16:00 (17:00 EET)		Report	Hız 10'; Uraz 20'; Neverdauskait 53' (o.g.); Çal 89'	Stadium: LFF Stadium; Referee: Olivia Tschon (Austria)

5 December 2023 2023–24 UEFA Nations League	Turkey	2–0	Georgia	Mersin, Turkey
16:00 (18:00 TRT)	Hız 26'; Türkoğlu 41'	Report		Stadium: Mersin Stadium; Referee: Jeļena Jermolajeva (Latvia)

=== 2024 ===
25 February Friendly	Turkey	1–2	Greece	Manavgat, Turkey
15:30	Uraz 12'	Report	Kapnisi 49'; Spyridonidou 90+5'	Stadium: Emirhan Sport Complex

28 February Friendly	Romania	0–1	Turkey	Manavgat, Turkey
		Report	Abrahamsson 54'	Stadium: Emirhan Sport Complex

5 April Euro 2025 qualifying	Switzerland	3–1	Turkey	Zürich
	Calligaris 30', 78'; Bühler 52'	Report	Türkoğlu 80'	Stadium: Letzigrund; Referee: Sandra Braz (Portugal)

9 April Euro 2025 qualifying	Turkey	2–1	Hungary	Istanbul
	Türkoğlu 80' Cin 87'	Report	Csányi 45+1'	Stadium: Pendik Stadyumu; Referee: Katarzyna Lisiecka-Sęk (Poland)

31 May Euro 2025 qualifying	Turkey	1–0	Azerbaijan	Erzincan
	Topçu 43' (pen.)	Report		Stadium: Erzincan 13 Şubat Şehir Stadium

4 June Euro 2025 qualifying	Azerbaijan	1–0	Turkey	Baku
	Mirzaliyeva 89'	Report		Stadium: Dalga Arena

12 July Euro 2025 qualifying	Turkey	0–2	Switzerland	İzmit
TBC		Report	Schertenleib 58'; Crnogorčević 65'	Stadium: Kocaeli Stadium

16 July UEFA Euro 2025 qualifying	Hungary	1–4	Turkey	Győr
	Kaján 66'		Şeker 14'; Keskin 55'; Sadıkoğlu 51'; Hançar 79'	Stadium: Gyirmóti Stadion

25 October UEFA Euro 2025 qualifying	Turkey	1–1	Ukraine	Istanbul
18:00	Keskin 61'	Report	Apanashchenko 31'	Stadium: Esenler Stadium

29 October UEFA Euro 2025 qualifying	Ukraine	2–0	Turkey	Chișinău, Moldova
18:00	Karataş 14' (o.g.); Yana Kotyk 34'	Report		Stadium: Zimbru Stadium

=== 2025 ===
21 February UEFA Nations League - B2	Republic of Ireland	1–0	Turkey	Dublin, Republic of Ireland
22:30	Carusa 45+3'	Report		Stadium: Tallaght Stadium; Referee: Molnár (HUN); Hegedus-Barath (HUN); Bizder (HUN)

25 February UEFA Nations League - B2	Turkey	1–0	Greece	Istanbul, Turkey
18:30	Keskin 33'	Report		Stadium: Pendik Stadium; Referee: Bočková (SVK), Pastoreková (SVK), Valentová (SVK)

4 April UEFA Nations League - B2	Slovenia	3–0	Turkey	Ljubljana, Slovenia
17:30	Kolbl 29'; Kramžar 36'; Prašnikar 65' (pen.)	Report		Stadium: Športni park Referee: Beyer (FRA); Maubacq (FRA); Jourdain (FRA)

8 April UEFA Nations League - B2	Turkey	0–1	Slovenia	Sivas, Turkey
19:00		Report	Kramžar 62'	Stadium: Yeni 4 Eylül Stadium; Referee: Michel GER; Uerstfeĺd GER; Fritzius; GER

30 May UEFA Nations League - B2	Turkey	1–2	Republic of Ireland	Istanbul, Turkey
20:00	Hançar 49'	Report	Şeker 80' (o.g.); Murphy 89'	Stadium: Esenler Stadium; Referee: Georgieva (BUL); Valeva (BUL); Dumbalakova (BUL)

3 June UEFA Nations League - B2	Greece	0–1	Turkey	Heraklion, Greece
20:00		Report	Hançar 42'	Stadium: Theodoros Vardinogiannis Stadium; Referee: Vanderstichel (FRA); Brassard (FRA); Boudina (FRA)

24 October 2025 UEFA Nations League play-off	Kosovo	0–4	Turkey	Pristina, Kosovo
18:00		Report	Hançar 5', 10'; Pekel 23' şeker 81'	Stadium: Fadil Vokrri Stadium; Referee: Pachtova (CZE); Ratajova (CZE); Holakovská (CZE)

28 October 2025 UEFA Nations League play-off	Turkey	3–0	Kosovo	İzmir, Turkey
20:00	Pekel 22'; Hançar 29' (pen.); Şeker 78'	Report		Stadium: Gürsel Aksel Stadium; Referee: Bočková (SVK); Baranowska (POL); Mostowska (POL)

28 November Friendly	Albania	1-1	Turkey	Istanbul, Turkey
19:00	Hilaj 20'		Topçu 50'	Stadium: Esenyurt Necmi Kadıoğlu Stadium; Referee: Lutfaliyeva (AZE), Nuriyeva(AZE), Akbarzada (AZE)

1 December 2025 Friendly	Turkey	2–0	Albania	Istanbul, Turkey
19:00	Şeker 14'; Altunkulak 81'			Stadium: THY Fielad; Referee: Lutfaliyeva (AZE), Nuriyeva(AZE), Akbarzada (AZE)

=== 2026 ===
3 March 2027 FIFA Women's World Cup qualification	Turkey	3–0	Malta	Istanbul, Turkey
17:00 TRT (UTC+03:00)	Farrugia 7' (o.g.); Topçu 29'; Karabulut 88'	Report		Stadium: Pendik Stadium; Attendance: 275; Referee: Eugenia Gil Soriano (Spain)

7 March 2027 FIFA Women's World Cup qualification	Northern Ireland	0–1	Turkey	Lurgan, Northern Ireland
19:00 GMT (UTC+00:00)		Report	Türkoğlu 24'	Stadium: Mourneview Park; Attendance: 2,186; Referee: Olivia Tschon (Austria)

14 April 2027 FIFA Women's World Cup qualification	Switzerland	3–1	Turkey	Zurich, Switzerland
19:00 CEST (UTC+02:00)	Csillag 49', 75'; Calligaris 80'	Report	Topçu 52'	Stadium: Letzigrund; Attendance: 12,355; Referee: Sofiya Prychyna (Ukraine)

18 April 2027 FIFA Women's World Cup qualification	Turkey	1–1	Switzerland	Sinop, Turkey
19:00 TRT (UTC+03:00)	Altınkulak 79'	Report	Crnogorčević 52'	Stadium: Sinop Şehir Stadium; Attendance: 5,981; Referee: Katalin Kulcsár (Hungary)

5 June 2027 FIFA Women's World Cup qualification	Turkey	2–1	Northern Ireland	Istanbul, Turkey
20:00 TRT (UTC+03:00)	Pekel 26'; Şeker 48'	Report	Bell 45' (pen.)	Stadium: Pendik Stadium; Attendance: 1,117; Referee: Alexandra Collin (France)

9 June 2027 FIFA Women's World Cup qualification	Malta	0–3	Turkey	Ta' Qali, Malta
19:00 CEST (UTC+02:00)		Report	Gatt 8' (o.g.); Türkoğlu 38'; Altunkulak 52'	Stadium: Centenary Stadium; Attendance: 994; Referee: Sabina Bolić (Croatia)

9 October 2027 FIFA Women's World Cup qualification play-offs	Turkey	3–3	Slovenia	Istanbul, Turkey
19:00 TRT (UTC+03:00)	Hançar 18' (pen.); Altunkulak 25', 75'	Report	Kajzba 62', 90+3'; Kastelec 81' Kastelec	Stadium: Pendik Stadium; Referee: Lina Lehtovaara (Finland)

13 October 2027 FIFA Women's World Cup qualification play-offs	Slovenia	2–0	Turkey	Domžale, Slovenia
17:00 CEST (UTC+02:00)	Sternad 83'; Kastelec 90+3'	Report		Stadium: Domžale Sports Park; Referee: Eugenia Gil Soriano (Spain)

== Head-to-head record ==
The following table shows Turkey's all-time international record, as of 16 April 2026.

Positive Record Neutral Record Negative Record

Opponents	Pld	W	D	L	GF	GA	GD
Albania	6	4	1	1	10	4	+6
Austria	3	0	1	2	2	7	-5
Azerbaijan	8	5	2	1	11	5	+6
Belarus	4	2	0	2	6	10	-4
Bosnia and Herzegovina	4	3	0	1	16	7	+9
Bulgaria	8	4	2	2	11	12	-1
Croatia	5	1	1	3	8	13	-5
England	4	0	0	4	0	18	-18
Estonia	8	5	2	1	22	9	+13
Faroe Islands	1	0	0	1	1	2	-1
Georgia	9	9	0	0	36	2	+34
Germany	7	0	0	7	1	51	-50
Greece	10	3	3	4	13	12	+1
Hungary	10	3	0	7	13	34	-21
Israel	7	6	0	1	24	6	+18
Jordan	3	2	0	1	12	2	+10
Kazakhstan	2	0	1	1	0	2	-2
Kosovo	5	3	1	1	7	4	+3
Latvia	1	1	0	0	5	0	+5
Lithuania	2	2	0	0	6	0	+6
Luxembourg	3	3	0	0	14	1	+13
Malta	5	5	0	0	15	2	+13
Moldova	2	1	1	0	2	0	+2
Montenegro	3	3	0	0	9	3	+6
Netherlands	2	0	0	2	0	11	-11
North Macedonia	1	1	0	0	4	0	+4
Northern Ireland	2	2	0	0	2	0	+2
Poland	1	0	0	1	1	2	-1
Portugal	4	0	1	3	2	9	-7
Republic of Ireland	2	0	0	2	1	3	-2
Romania	12	2	0	10	7	43	-36
Russia	4	0	1	3	3	8	-5
Slovakia	5	0	2	3	1	11	-10
Slovenia	4	0	0	4	2	13	-11
Spain	4	0	0	4	2	24	-22
Serbia (Note: Includes the results of FR Yugoslavia.)	4	0	0	4	2	16	-14
Switzerland	5	0	0	5	3	16	-13
Ukraine	6	0	0	6	0	20	-20
Wales	2	0	0	2	1	6	-5
Total (39)	178	70	19	89	275	388	-113

== See also ==
- Turkey women's national football team head to head
- Turkey national football team results
- Turkish football clubs in European competitions
- Turkey national under-21 football team
- Turkey national under-19 football team
- Turkey national under-17 football team
- Turkey women's national under-21 football team
- Turkey women's national under-19 football team
- Turkey women's national under-17 football team
