= UEFA Women's Euro 2013 qualifying Group 2 =

Football tournament qualification stage

The UEFA Women's Euro 2013 qualifying – Group 2 was contested by six teams competing for one spot for the final tournament.

Spain's María Paz set a new competition record when she scored seven goals against Kazakhstan.

== Standings ==
Team qualified for UEFA Women's Euro 2013
Team competes in Play-off round

Team	Pld	W	D	L	GF	GA	GD	Pts
Germany	10	9	1	0	64	3	+61	28
Spain	10	6	2	2	43	14	+29	20
Romania	10	5	1	4	20	20	0	16
Switzerland	10	5	0	5	29	24	+5	15
Kazakhstan	10	2	1	7	4	55	−51	7
Turkey	10	0	1	9	4	48	−44	1

Source: UEFA.com

== Fixtures ==
All times are UTC+2.

17 September 2011
13:00

Kazakhstan	0–3	Romania
	Report	Rus 7'; Bortan 15'; Laiu 51'

Kazhimukana Munaytpasova, Shymkent
Attendance: 205
Referee: Caroline De Boeck (Belgium)
17 September 2011
15:45

Germany	4–1	Switzerland
Bajramaj 32', 66'; Bresonik 73'; Müller 79'	Report	Bachmann 68'

Impuls Arena, Augsburg
Attendance: 6,632
Referee: Silvia Tea Spinelli (Italy)
17 September 2011
18:00

Turkey	1–10	Spain
Güngör 20'	Report	Adriana 9', 51'; Borja 11', 65'; Boquete 26', 46', 69'; Sonia 44'; Corredera 82'; Olabarrieta 86'

Recep Tayyip Erdoğan Stadium, Istanbul
Attendance: 442
Referee: Tanja Schett (Austria)

21 September 2011
18:30

Switzerland	4–1	Romania
Crnogorčević 43', 87'; Bachmann 73', 84'	Report	Duşa 54'

Stadion Brügglifeld, Aarau
Attendance: 650
Referee: Katalin Kulcsar (Hungary)

22 September 2011
13:00

Kazakhstan	2–0	Turkey
Li 57'; Kirgizbaeva 89'	Report

Kazhimukana Munaytpasova, Shymkent
Attendance: 350
Referee: Petra Chudá (Slovakia)

22 October 2011
14:00

Turkey	0–0	Kazakhstan
	Report

Burhanettin Kocamaz, Tarsus, Mersin
Attendance: 1,652
Referee: Leen Martens (Belgium)
22 October 2011
16:00

Romania	0–3	Germany
	Report	Goeßling 21'; Bajramaj 56'; Behringer 59' (pen.)

Stadionul Mogoşoaia, Bucharest
Attendance: 200
Referee: Jana Adámková (Czech Republic)

23 October 2011
12:00

Spain	3–2	Switzerland
Adriana 19', 36'; Boquete 71'	Report	Bachmann 58'; Mehmeti 69'

La Ciudad del Fútbol, Madrid
Attendance: 350
Referee: Jenny Palmqvist (Sweden)

27 October 2011
11:00

Kazakhstan	0–4	Spain
	Report	Sonia 19', 82'; Adriana 50' (pen.); Meseguer 86'

BIIK Stadium, Shymkent
Attendance: 80
Referee: Mihaela Basimamović (Croatia)
27 October 2011
16:00

Romania	7–1	Turkey
Laiu 6'; Sârghe 34'; Duşa 37', 47', 60'; Rus 74', 86'	Report	Defterli 45+2'

Stadionul Mogoşoaia, Bucharest
Attendance: 50
Referee: Donka Jeleva-Terzieva (Bulgaria)

19 November 2011
15:45

Germany	17–0	Kazakhstan
Okoyino da Mbabi 3', 10', 14', 16'; Popp 5', 11', 31', 59'; Laudehr 23', 41'; Behringer 36' (pen.); Bajramaj 51'; Peter 62', 65', 89'; Müller 74', 85'	Report

BRITA-Arena, Wiesbaden
Attendance: 6,528
Referee: Carina Vitulano (Italy)

20 November 2011
15:00

Romania	0–4	Spain
	Report	Sonia 42'; Boquete 52', 73'; Adriana 84'

Stadionul Buftea, Buftea
Attendance: 106
Referee: Gyöngyi Gaál (Hungary)

23 November 2011
13:00

Turkey	1–2	Romania
Ficzay 86' (o.g.)	Report	Rus 11'; Ficzay 62'

Buca Arena, İzmir
Attendance: 282
Referee: Karolina Radzik-Johan (Poland)

24 November 2011
18:00

Switzerland	8–1	Kazakhstan
Dickenmann 4', 45+1', 81'; Mändly 16'; Moser 28' (pen.); Wälti 44'; Bachmann 56', 60'	Report	Karibayeva 42'

Stadion Brügglifeld, Aarau
Attendance: 750
Referee: Gordana Kuzmanović (Serbia)
24 November 2011
20:30

Spain	2–2	Germany
Boquete 57'; Willy 90+1'	Report	Goeßling 27'; García 30' (o.g.)

Estadio Escribano Castilla, Motril
Attendance: 2,600
Referee: Kateryna Monzul (Ukraine)

15 February 2012
16:00

Turkey	0–5	Germany
	Report	Marozsán 10'; Okoyino da Mbabi 11'; Bresonik 71'; Behringer 76', 90'

Buca Arena, İzmir
Attendance: 1,342
Referee: Gordana Kuzmanović (Serbia)

31 March 2012
10:00

Romania	3–0	Kazakhstan
Bănuță 53', 87'; Duşa 65'	Report

Stadionul Buftea, Buftea
Attendance: 60
Referee: Sabine Bonnin (France)
31 March 2012
16:00

Germany	5–0	Spain
Okoyino da Mbabi 24', 58', 68', 86'; Popp 61'	Report

Carl-Benz-Stadion, Mannheim
Attendance: 11,617
Referee: Efthalia Mitsi (Greece)
31 March 2012
18:00

Switzerland	5–0	Turkey
Mändly 3', 9'; Bachmann 30'; Crnogorčević 53'; Dickenmann 87'	Report

Stadion Brügglifeld, Aarau
Attendance: 1,200
Referee: Marina Mamaeva (Russia)

5 April 2012
12:00

Spain	13–0	Kazakhstan
Boquete 20' (pen.), 68' (pen.); Bermúdez 22'; Borja 29', 54'; Vilas 33', 38', 45', 51', 59', 60', 79'; Torrejón 78'	Report

La Ciudad del Fútbol, Madrid
Attendance: 250
Referee: Lilach Asulin (Israel)
5 April 2012
18:15

Switzerland	0–6	Germany
	Report	Okoyino da Mbabi 16', 38', 71', 85'; Mittag 24'; Egli 64' (o.g.)

Stadion Brügglifeld, Aarau
Attendance: 3,600
Referee: Tanja Schett (Austria)

31 May 2012
18:00

Germany	5–0	Romania
Bresonik 1'; Popp 34', 50', 90'; Marozsán 40'	Report

Bielefelder Alm, Bielefeld
Attendance: 8,183
Referee: Saša Ihringová (England)

16 June 2012
18:30

Switzerland	4–3	Spain
Bachmann 18', 80'; Crnogorčević 54'; Zumbühl 82'	Report	Vilas 25'; García 37'; Boquete 73' (pen.)

Stadion Brügglifeld, Aarau
Attendance: 760
Referee: Kirsi Heikkinen (Finland)

21 June 2012
11:30

Spain	4–0	Turkey
Sonia 13'; Vilas 32', 34'; Kıraç 73' (o.g.)	Report

La Ciudad del Fútbol, Madrid
Attendance: 100
Referee: Rhona Daly (Ireland)
21 June 2012
18:00

Romania	4–2	Switzerland
Rus 41', 60', 81'; Duşa 61'	Report	Crnogorčević 8'; Abbé 64'

Stadionul Buftea, Buftea
Attendance: 100
Referee: Natalia Avdonchenko (Russia)

15 September 2012
15:00

Kazakhstan	0–7	Germany
	Report	Okoyino da Mbabi 8', 42'; Odebrecht 33'; Mittag 55'; Schmidt 63'; Müller 86'; Goeßling 87'

Shakhtyor Müller, Karagandy
Attendance: 1,000
Referee: Monica Larsen (Norway)
15 September 2012
17:00

Turkey	1–3	Switzerland
Uraz 27'	Report	Dickenmann 25'; Bachmann 70', 73'

Atatürk Olympic Stadium, Istanbul
Attendance: 124
Referee: Ginta Pēce (Latvia)

19 September 2012
11:00

Kazakhstan	1–0	Switzerland
Yalova 58'	Report

Shakhtyor Stadium, Karagandy
Attendance: 300
Referee: Marija Damjanović (Croatia)
19 September 2012
17:00

Germany	10–0	Turkey
Okoyino da Mbabi 17', 74'; Mittag 24'; Laudehr 45+1' (pen.); Behringer 52', 60' (pen.); Müller 72', 86', 90+2'; Bajramaj 85'	Report

Schauinsland-Reisen-Arena, Duisburg
Attendance: 6,467
Referee: Natalia Avdonchenko (Russia)
19 September 2012
18:00

Spain	0–0	Romania
	Report

La Ciudad del Fútbol, Madrid
Attendance: 298
Referee: Anastasia Pustovoitova (Russia)

== Goalscorers ==
17 goals

- (Germany) Célia Okoyino da Mbabi

11 goals

- (Switzerland) Ramona Bachmann

10 goals

- (Spain) Verónica Boquete
- (Spain) María Paz Vilas

8 goals

- (Germany) Alexandra Popp

7 goals

- (Germany) Martina Müller
- (Romania) Laura Rus

6 goals

- (Germany) Melanie Behringer
- (Romania) Cosmina Duşa
- (Spain) Adriana Martín
- (Spain) Sonia Bermúdez

5 goals

- (Germany) Fatmire Bajramaj
- (Switzerland) Ana-Maria Crnogorčević
- (Switzerland) Lara Dickenmann

4 goals

- (Spain) Priscila Borja

3 goals

- (Germany) Linda Bresonik
- (Germany) Lena Goeßling
- (Germany) Simone Laudehr
- (Germany) Anja Mittag
- (Germany) Babett Peter
- (Switzerland) Sandy Mändly

2 goals

- (Germany) Dzsenifer Marozsán
- (Romania) Anne-Marie Bănuță
- (Romania) Andreea Laiu

1 goal

- (Germany) Viola Odebrecht
- (Germany) Bianca Schmidt
- (Kazakhstan) Saule Karibayeva
- (Kazakhstan) Begaim Kirgizbaeva
- (Kazakhstan) Larisa Li
- (Kazakhstan) Mariya Yalova
- (Romania) Ioana Bortan
- (Romania) Maria Ficzay
- (Romania) Raluca Sârghe
- (Spain) Marta Corredera
- (Spain) Ruth García
- (Spain) Silvia Meseguer
- (Spain) Amaia Olabarrieta
- (Spain) Marta Torrejón
- (Spain) Willy
- (Switzerland) Caroline Abbé
- (Switzerland) Jehona Mehmeti
- (Switzerland) Martina Moser
- (Switzerland) Lia Wälti
- (Switzerland) Selina Zumbühl
- (Turkey) Bilgin Defterli
- (Turkey) Leyla Güngör
- (Turkey) Yağmur Uraz

1 own goal

- (Romania) Maria Ficzay (playing against Turkey)
- (Spain) Ruth García (playing against Germany)
- (Switzerland) Marie-Andrea Egli (playing against Germany)
- (Turkey) Seval Kıraç (playing against Spain)
