= Eryurt =

Eryurt is a Turkish surname. Notable people with the surname include:

- Dilhan Eryurt (1926–2012), Turkish astrophysicist
- Melahat Eryurt (born 1975), Turkish footballer
