= Bilgin Defterli =

Turkish women's football forward

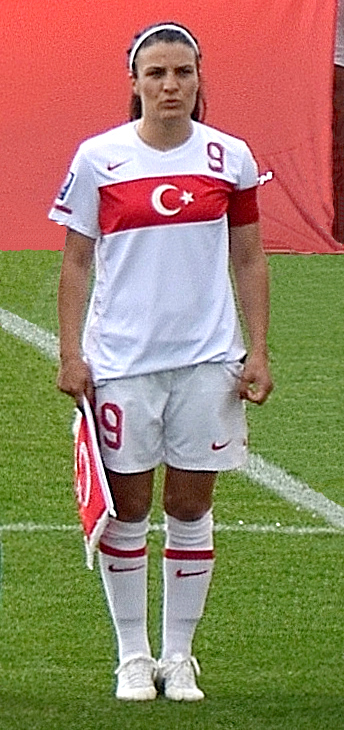
- Bilgin Defterli for Turkey national team in the match against Belarus.

Personal information
- Date of birth: 1 November 1980 (age 45)
- Place of birth: Erzurum, Turkey
- Height: 1.60 m (5 ft 3 in)
- Position: Forward

Senior career*
Years	Team	Apps	(Gls)
1996–1997	Istanbul Dinarsu Spor		
1997–1999	Feriköy SK		
1999–2000	Delta Mobilyaspor		
2001–2003	Kuzeyspor		
2002–2003	→ Hatay Sanayispor (on loan)		
2004–2005	FSV Frankfurt		
2005–2009	FFC Brauweiler Pulheim		
2009–2014	1. FC Köln		
2014–2016	Alemannia Aachen		

International career^{‡}
1999–2014	Turkey	52	(16)
- * Club domestic league appearances and goals as of December 2, 2013 ‡ National team caps and goals as of September 17, 2014

Bilgin Defterli (born 1 November 1980) is a Turkish former women's football forward. She had been a member of the Turkey women's national football team from 1999 to 2014 and served as their captain. Defterli is 160 cm (5 ft 3 in) tall.

== Early life ==
Defterli was born on November 1, 1980, in Erzurum, Turkey. She was the youngest of six children, four girls and two boys. Between 1991 and 1996, she participated in several sports, winning five titles and two second places. She enjoyed football, playing with boys in the neighborhood and competing on the school boys' team that took part in tournaments. Her secondary school physical education teacher noticed Defterli's talent and convinced her parents that she had a football playing future. Defterli entered the women's football club Istanbul Dinarsu Spor in 1996.

== Playing career ==
=== Club ===
==== In Turkey ====
At Istanbul Dinarsu Spor, she played and experienced championships in the Turkish Women's First Football League. Defterli was loaned out then to Feriköy SK, where she won a championship in the Second League and helped her team to get promoted to the First League. That season, she was honored with the title Top Scorer for her 29 goals in 20 league matches. In the 2000 season with Delta Mobilyaspor, Defterli finished with another league championship and her second Top Scorer title. The following year she was with Kuzeyspor, where she earned a First League championship once again. After playing one year on loan at Hatay Sanayispor, she returned home to Istanbul and learned that the women's football leagues in Turkey would be dissolved.

==== In Germany ====
Seeing no chance to play football in Turkey due to the dissolution of women's football leagues in 2003, she decided to go abroad. She applied to women's football clubs around Frankfurt in Germany, where her uncle was living. She received an invitation from FSV Frankfurt to take part in trainings limited to one month. In 2004, the Turkish women's national football player was accepted to join the squad of FSV Frankfurt. Lacking knowledge of any foreign language, Defterli did not have an easy time there in the beginning. She transferred to FFC Brauweiler Pulheim the next season, where she scored 28 goals in 24 matches. Her club disbanded in 2009 and she joined 1. FC Köln. The club competes in the German Regionalliga West. Scoring 22 goals in 20 league matches in her first year with 1. FC Köln, she was awarded the title Top Scorer for the third time in her career, and became the first foreign player honored with this title in the "2. Fußball-Bundesliga für Frauen". In June 2013, she extended her contract with 1. FC Köln.

After playing five years for 1. FC Köln, Defterli transferred to Alemannia Aachen in July 2014, which was recently promoted to the 2. Fußball-Bundesliga für Frauen.

Bilgin Defterli is nicknamed Billy by her fans in Germany. She is known for turning a somersault on the field after scoring a goal.

=== International ===
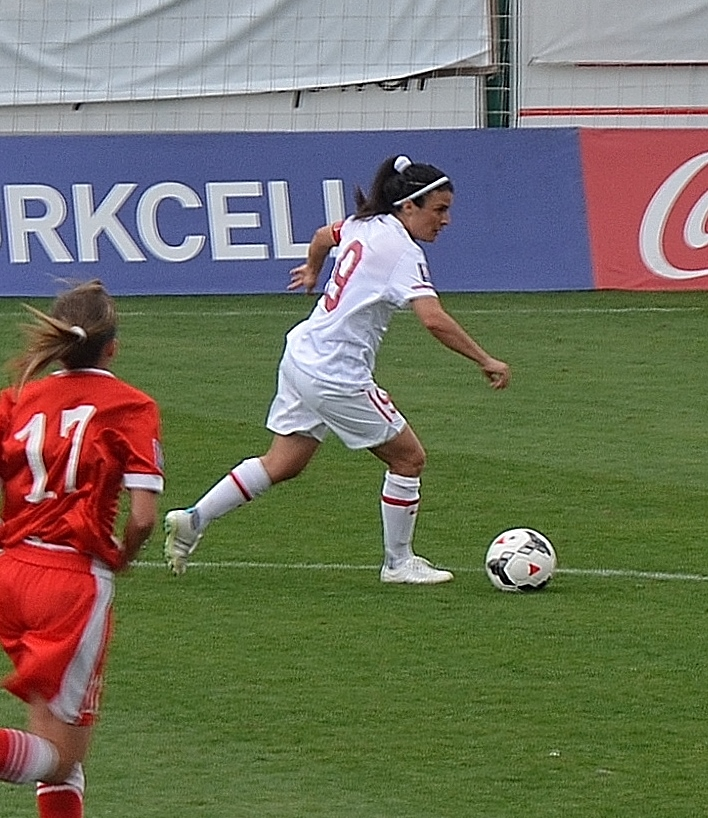
Bilgin Defterli in the 2015 FIFA Women's World Cup qualification – UEFA Group 6 match against Belarus.

Defterli made her national-team debut in the UEFA Women's Euro 2001 qualifying match against the Greek team, which was held on December 18, 1999, in Karditsa, Greece.

At the 2003 FIFA World Cup qualification (UEFA) – Group 8 round, she scored a goal against both Bosnia and Herzegovina and Hungary. Defterli netted two of the nine goals scored against the Georgian women's team at the UEFA Women's Euro 2009 qualifying in 2006. At UEFA Support International Tournament matches between 2007 and 2009, she scored a total of seven goals. She scored goals in the 2011 FIFA Women's World Cup qualification – UEFA Group 5 matches against both Malta and Austria. Defterli netted a goal in the friendly game against Greece on April 29, 2011. At the UEFA Women's Euro 2013 qualifying – Group 2 match against the Romanian team, which the Turkish women lost 1–7, she scored the only goal for her country.

International goals
Date	Venue	Opponent	Result	Competition	Scored
October 27, 2001	Zeytinburnu Stadium Istanbul, Turkey	Bosnia and Herzegovina	5–1	2003 FIFA World Cup qualification (UEFA) – Group 8	1
November 21, 2001	Şenlikköy Stadium Istanbul, Turkey	Hungary	1–4	2003 FIFA World Cup qualification (UEFA) – Group 8	1
May 2, 2002	Stadion Rudara Kakanj, Bosnia and Herzegovina	Bosnia and Herzegovina	2–3	2003 FIFA World Cup qualification (UEFA) – Group 8	1
November 23, 2006	Adana 5 Ocak Stadium Adana, Turkey	Georgia	9–0	UEFA Women's Euro 2009 qualifying	2
November 8, 2007	Buca Arena Buca, İzmir Province, Turkey	Azerbaijan	4–2	UEFA Support International Tournament	1
June 27, 2008	Paide linnastaadion Paide, Estonia	Estonia	6–0	UEFA Support International Tournament	2
June 29, 2008	Rakvere linnastaadion Rakvere, Estonia	Croatia	4–2	UEFA Support International Tournament	2
December 19, 2008	İsmet Paşa Stadium İzmit, Turkey	Latvia	5–0	UEFA Support International Tournament	1
May 16, 2009	Mikheil Meskhi Stadium Tbilisi, Georgia	Macedonia	4–0	UEFA Support International Tournament	1
April 11, 2010	Hüseyin Avni Aker Stadium Trabzon, Turkey	Malta	5–1	2011 FIFA Women's World Cup qualification – UEFA Group 5	1
August 25, 2010	Samsun 19 Mayıs Stadium Samsun, Turkey	Austria	2–2	2011 FIFA Women's World Cup qualification – UEFA Group 5	1
April 29, 2011	Bolu Atatürk Stadium Bolu, Turkey	Greece	4–1	Friendly	1
October 27, 2011	Stadionul Mogoşoaia Bucharest, Romania	Romania	1–7	UEFA Women's Euro 2013 qualifying – Group 2	1

== Honors ==
=== Individual ===
- Top Scorer 1998–99 – Turkish Women's Second Football League with Feriköy SK
- Top Scorer 2000–2001 – Turkish Women's First Football League with Kuzeyspor
- Top Scorer 2009–10 – 2. Fußball-Bundesliga für Frauen, Group South with 1. FC Köln
