= Reyhan Şeker =

Turkish footballer (born 1984)

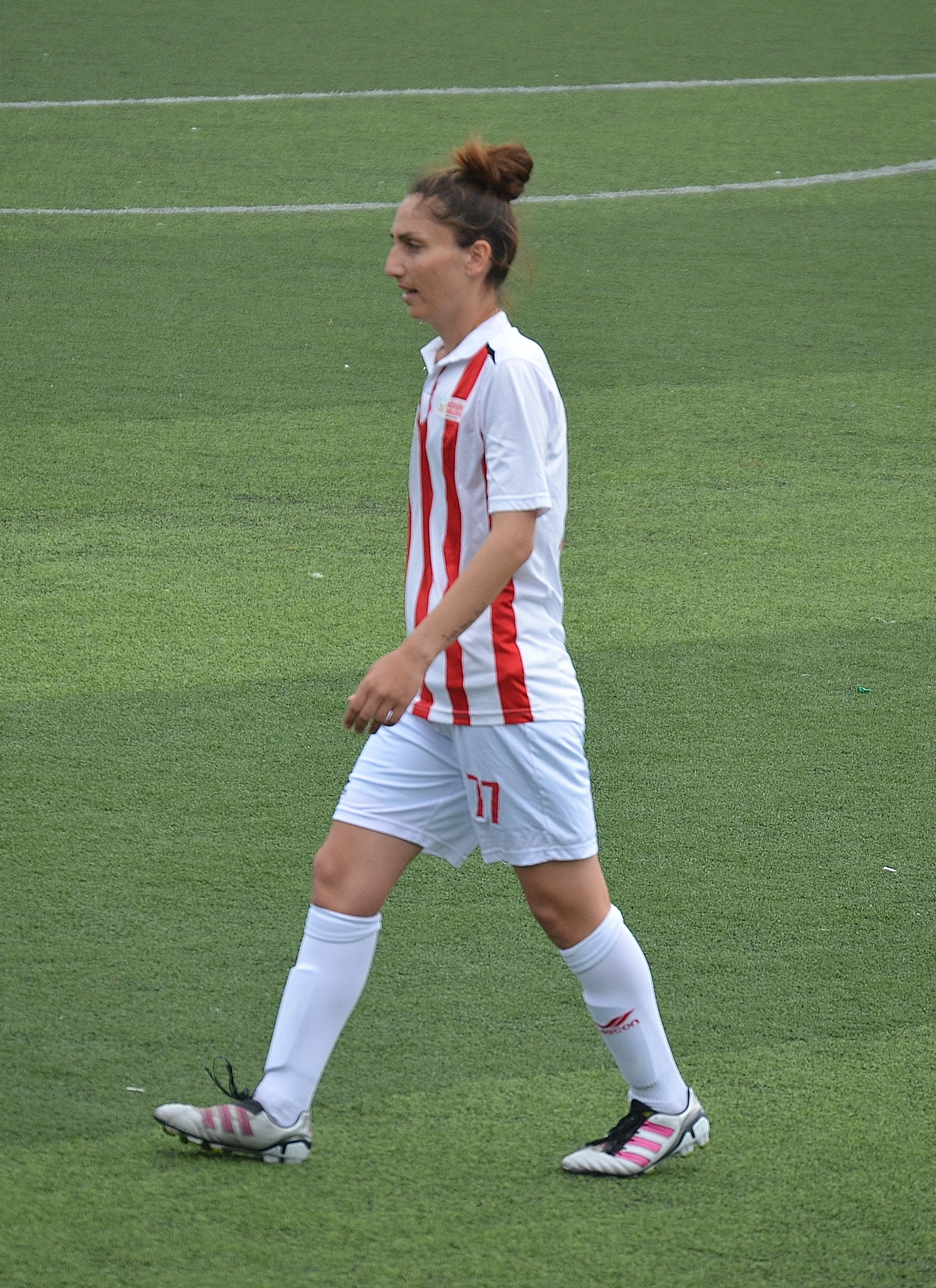
- Reyhan Şeker for Ataşehir Belediyespor in 2014

Personal information
- Date of birth: May 22, 1984 (age 42)
- Place of birth: Ankara, Turkey
- Position: Midfielder

Senior career*
| Years | Team | Apps | (Gls) |
| 2008–2010 | Gazi Üniversitesispor | 35 | (49) |
| 2010–2018 | Ataşehir Belediyesi | 137 | (53) |
| Total | | 172 | (102) |

International career^{‡}
| 2006–2012 | Turkey | 21 | (10) |
- * Club domestic league appearances and goals as of January 13, 2018 ‡ National team caps and goals as of September 19, 2012

Reyhan Şeker (born May 22, 1984) is a Turkish retired women's footballer who plays as a midfielder. She last played in the Turkish Women's First Football League for Ataşehir Belediyesi in Istanbul. She is a member of the Turkey women's national football team since 2006.

== Playing career ==
=== Club ===
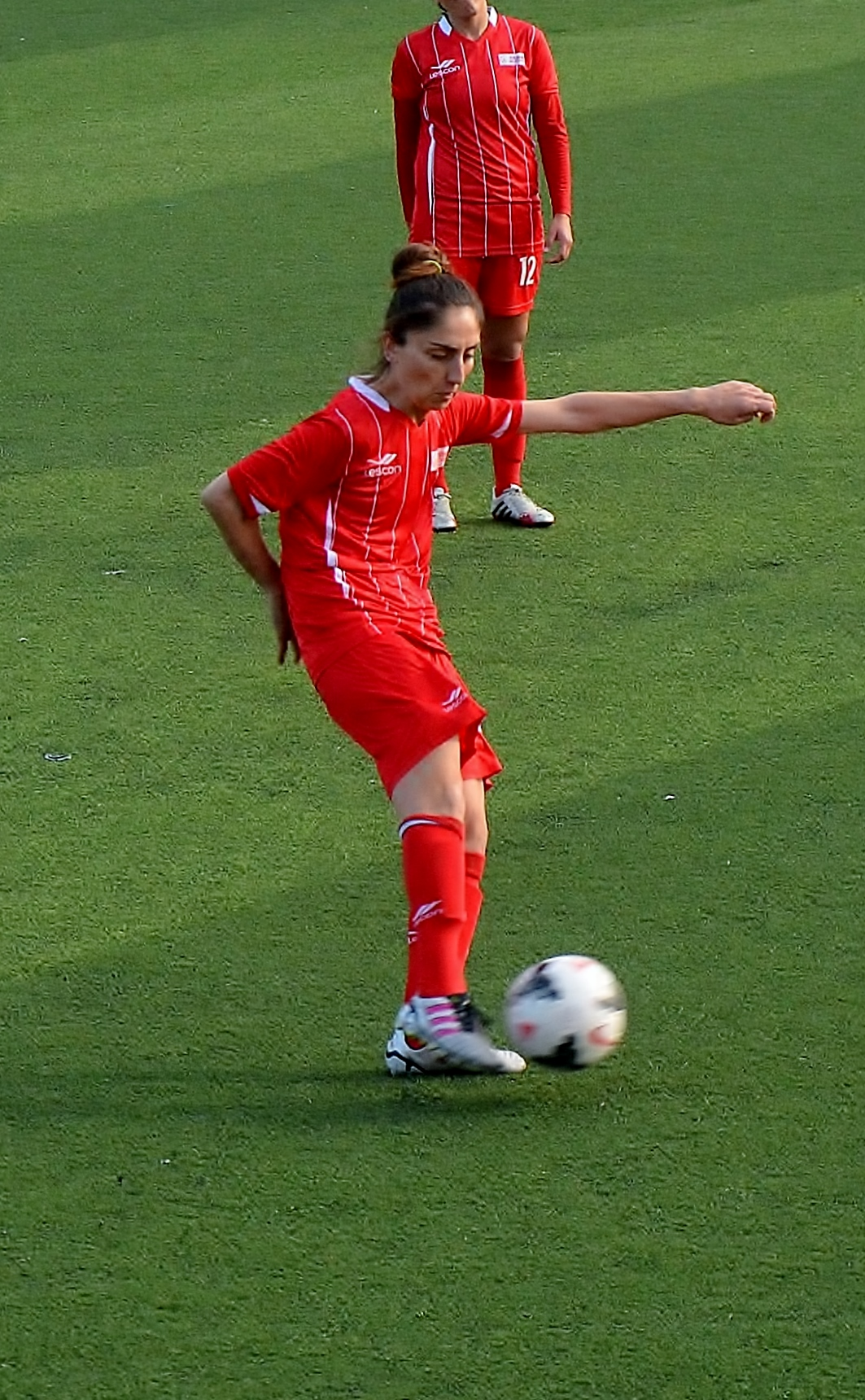
Reyhan Şeker playing for Ataşehir Belediyespor in the 2014–15 season

By receiving her license on March 4, 2003, Reyhan Şeker began football playing at the club Gazi Üniversitesispor in Ankara, where she was born. She played in all the age teams of the club, and became finally part of the senior team in the 2008–09 season. In the 2009–10 season, her team finished the Women's First League as champion, and she was honored with the title Top Scorer for her 32 goals.

In the 2010–11 season, Şeker transferred to Ataşehir Belediyesi in Istanbul. In two successive seasons, 2010–11 and 2011–12, she enjoyed league championships with her club Ataşehir Belediyespor.

She debuted in the UEFA Women's Champions League playing in the 2011–12 qualifying round match with Ataşehir Belediyesi against Gintra Universitetas from Lithuania on August 11, 2011.

=== International ===
She made her first appearance in the national team taking part at the UEFA Women's Euro 2009 qualifying match against Northern Ireland on November 18, 2006.

Şeker was the scorer of two goals in the match, which the Turkey nationals defeated the Georgia women's national football team 9–0 at the UEFA Women's Euro 2009 qualifying round. At the UEFA Support International Tournament in 2007, she scored a goal against Azerbaijan. Şeker netted a goal in the match against the Croatian women and two against the Latvians in the 2008 UEFA Support International Tournament played in Turkey. At the 4th UEFA Support International Tournament held 2009 in Georgia, she scored a goal against Georgia and two goals against Macedonia.

International goals
| Date | Venue | Opponent | Result | Competition | Scored |
|---|---|---|---|---|---|
| November 23, 2006 | Adana 5 Ocak Stadium Adana, Turkey | Georgia | 9–0 | UEFA Women's Euro 2009 qualifying – Group A1 | 2 |
| November 8, 2007 | Buca Arena Buca, İzmir Province, Turkey | Azerbaijan | 4–2 | 2nd UEFA Support International Tournament | 1 |
| December 12, 2008 | Sakarya Atatürk Stadium Adapazarı, Turkey | Croatia | 2–2 | 3rd UEFA Support International Tournament | 1 |
| December 19, 2008 | İsmet Paşa Stadium İzmit, Turkey | Latvia | 5–0 | 3rd UEFA Support International Tournament | 2 |
| May 13, 2009 | Poladi Stadium Rustavi, Georgia | Georgia | 4–0 | 4th UEFA Support International Tournament | 1 |
| May 16, 2009 | Mikheil Meskhi Stadium Tbilisi, Georgia | Macedonia | 4–0 | 4th UEFA Support International Tournament | 2 |

== Career statistics ==
As of January 13, 2018.

| Club | Season | League | | | Continental | | National | | Total | |
| Club | Season | Division | Apps | Goals | Apps | Goals | Apps | Goals | Apps | Goals |
|---|---|---|---|---|---|---|---|---|---|---|
| Gazi Üniversitesispor | 2006–09 | First League | 17 | 17 | – | – | 12 | 9 | 29 | 26 |
| Gazi Üniversitesispor | 2009–10 | First League | 18 | 32 | – | – | 6 | 0 | 24 | 32 |
| Gazi Üniversitesispor | Total | | 35 | 49 | – | – | 18 | 9 | 53 | 58 |
| Ataşehir Belediyespor | 2010–11 | First League | 18 | 17 | – | – | 1 | 0 | 19 | 17 |
| Ataşehir Belediyespor | 2011–12 | First League | 18 | 11 | 3 | 0 | 1 | 0 | 22 | 11 |
| Ataşehir Belediyespor | 2012–13 | First League | 18 | 13 | 2 | 0 | 2 | 0 | 22 | 13 |
| Ataşehir Belediyespor | 2013–14 | First League | 16 | 1 | – | – | 0 | 0 | 16 | 1 |
| Ataşehir Belediyespor | 2014–15 | First League | 17 | 4 | – | – | 0 | 0 | 17 | 4 |
| Ataşehir Belediyespor | 2015–16 | First League | 18 | 5 | – | – | 0 | 0 | 18 | 5 |
| Ataşehir Belediyespor | 2016–17 | First League | 23 | 2 | – | – | 0 | 0 | 23 | 2 |
| Ataşehir Belediyespor | 2017–18 | First League | 9 | 0 | – | – | 0 | 0 | 9 | 0 |
| Ataşehir Belediyespor | Total | | 137 | 53 | 5 | 0 | 4 | 0 | 146 | 53 |
| Career total | | | 172 | 102 | 5 | 0 | 22 | 9 | 199 | 111 |

== Honours ==
=== Club ===
Turkish Women's First League Champion

Gazi Üniversitesispor
Winners (1): 2009–10

Ataşehir Belediyespor
Winners (2): 2010–11, 2011–12
Runners-up (4): 2012–13, 2013–14, 2014–15, 2015–16
Third places (1): 2016–17

=== Individual ===
Top Scorer 2009–10 Women's First League (32 goals) with Gazi Üniversitesispor
