= Helga Nadire İnan Ertürk =

Turkish-German footballer

Nadire İnan
Personal information
- Full name: Helga Nadire İnan Ertürk
- Date of birth: 10 September 1984 (age 42)
- Place of birth: Mönchengladbach, North Rhine-Westphalia, Germany
- Position: Midfielder

Senior career*
Years	Team	Apps	(Gls)
2003	FSC Mönchengladbach		
2004–2005	FCR 2001 Duisburg		
2006–2008	SG Wattenscheid 09 Women		
2009–2011	FFC Zuchwil 05		
2012–present	Sakarya; Yenikent Güneşspor		

International career^{‡}
2008–2010	Turkey	10	(2)
- * Club domestic league appearances and goals ‡ National team caps and goals as of 27 March 2010

Helga Nadire İnan Ertürk, aka Nadija Inan or Nadja Inan (born Helga Nadire İnan on 10 September 1984), is a Turkish-German women's football who plays as a midfielder in the Turkish Women's Second Football League for Sakarya Yenikent Güneşspor. She was a member of the Turkey national team between 2008 and 2010.

== Club career ==
Inan entered in her hometown club FSC Mönchengladbach in July 2003, and played until the end of that year. Then, she played in other German clubs FCR 2001 Duisburg (January 2004 – June 2005) and SG Wattenscheid 09 Women (July 2006 – June 2008).

Inan transferred to FFC Zuchwil 05, competing at the Nationalliga A Women in Switzerland between 2009 and 2011.

In January 2012, she moved to Turkey to play for Sakarya Yenikent Güneşspor with the initiative of her uncle, who is the father of women's national player Burcu Düner.

== International career ==
She scored her first goal for Turkey at the UEFA Support Tournament against Estonia women's national football team in 2008. In the UEFA Support Tournament next year, she netted a goal against Macedonian women.

== Career statistics ==
International goals
Date	Venue	Opponent	Result	Competition	Scored
27 June 2008	Paide linnastaadion Paide, Estonia	Estonia	6–0	UEFA Support International Tournament	1
16 May 2009	Mikheil Meskhi Stadium Tbilisi, Georgia	Macedonia	4–0	4th UEFA Support International Tournament	1

== See also ==
- Turkish women in sports
