= Hasret Altındere =

Turkish footballer (born 1980)

Personal information
- Date of birth: January 1, 1980 (age 46)
- Place of birth: Bornova, İzmir Province, Turkey

Senior career*
Years	Team	Apps	(Gls)
1997–1998	Balıkesir Belediyespor		
1998–1999	Susurluk Barışspor		
1999–2001	Gemlik Zeytinspor		
2001–2002	Kuzeyspor	10	(3)

International career
1998	Turkey U-19	2	(0)
1998–2002	Turkey	18	(3)
- * Club domestic league appearances and goals

Hasret Altındere (born January 1, 1980) is a Turkish former women's footballer. She was part of the Turkish women's national team between 1998 and 2002.

== Life ==
Hasret Altındere was born in Bornova district of İzmir Province, Turkey.

== Playing career ==
=== Club ===
She began her sports career after receiving her license for Balıkesir Belediyespor on October 24, 1997. She transferred to Susurluk Barışspor for the 1998–99 season. After one season, she moved to Gemlik Zeytinspor. In the beginning of 2001, Altındere signed for Kuzeyspor, where she played two seasons until 2002.

=== International ===
Hasret Altındere was admitted to the national team in 1998. After sitting on the bench in her first match at the 1999 FIFA Women's World Cup qualification (UEFA) - Group G match against Bulgaria, she debuted in the Women's Harvest Cup match against the Austrian team on July 29, 1998. She netted a goal in the match with Israel of the same tournament.

Altındere was also part of the Turkey women's U-19 team in two matches of the 1999 UEFA Women's Under-19 Championship qualifying round.

She played in one match of the 2001 UEFA Women's Championship qualification - Group 8 and in eight matches of the 2003 FIFA Women's World Cup qualification (UEFA) - Group 8 round. Altındere netted two goals against the women from Bosnia and Herzegovina. She capped in a total of 20 games for Turkey, and scored three goals.

International goals
Date	Venue	Opponent	Result	Competition	Scored
August 1, 1998	Mestský štadión, Dubnica, Slovakia	Israel	3-0	Women's Harvest Cup	1
October 27, 2001	Zeytinburnu Stadium, Istanbul, Turkey	Bosnia and Herzegovina	5-1	2003 FIFA Women's World Cup qualification (UEFA) - Group 8	2

== See also ==
- Turkish women in sports
