= Seyhan Gündüz =

Turkish footballer (born 1980)

Personal information
- Date of birth: September 15, 1980 (age 46)
- Place of birth: Bakırköy, Istanbul, Turkey
- Position: Forward

Youth career
- 1993–1996: Taçspor

Senior career*
| Years | Team | Apps | (Gls) |
| 1996–1999 | Dinarsuspor | | |
| 1999 | Zara Ekinlispor | | |
| 1999–2000 | Marshall Boyaspor | | |
| 2001–2002 | Zeytinburnuspor | 11 | (6) |

International career
| 1997–2002 | Turkey | 30 | (12) |
- * Club domestic league appearances and goals

Seyhan Gündüz (born September 15, 1980) is a Turkish former women's footballer who plays as a forward. She last played in the Turkish Women's First Football League for Zeytinburnuspor in Istanbul. She was part of the Turkish women's national team between 1997 and 2002.

== Playing career ==
=== Club ===
Seyhan Gündüz began football playing with boys in the neighborhood. With the support of her parents, she joined Taçspor, a local football club, at the age of 13. On September 19, 1996, she obtained her license, and began playing for Dinarsusspor, which was already the Turkish Women's Football League champion for three successive seasons. In her first season with Dinarsuspor, the 1996–97 season, her club won the championship, their fourth successive achievement. In August 1999, she transferred to Zara Ekinlispor, who was the league champion for the second consecutive time. She left it to move to Marshall Boyaspor in November that year, and played two seasons there. In May 2001, she signed for Zeytinburnuspor. At the end of the 2001–02 season, Gündüz retired from active playing.

=== International ===
Gündüz made her national team debut at the age of 17 in the friendly match against Estonia women's national football team on August 30, 1997. At the 1999 FIFA Women's World Cup qualification (UEFA) – Group G matches, she scored two goals against Bulgaria that helped her team win by 2–1. She netted later in the tournament one goal against Greece. Gündüz netted one goal against the women from Bosnia and Herzegovina and two goals against the Greek nationals at the 2001 UEFA Women's Championship qualification – Group 8 matches. Gündüz took part at the 2003 FIFA World Cup qualification (UEFA) – Group 8 matches, and scored one goal against Belarus and another against Bosnia and Herzegovina.

She capped 32 times, scoring a total of 12 goals for the national team, including four goals in international friendly matches, with an overall of 0.375 per match. Her last appearance was in the match against Hungary at the 2003 FIFA World Cup qualification round on May 23, 2002.

International goals ^{†}
| Date | Venue | Opponent | Result | Competition | Scored |
|---|---|---|---|---|---|
| November 23, 1997 | CSKA Stadium, Sofia, Bulgaria | Bulgaria | 2–1 | 1999 FIFA Women's World Cup qualification (UEFA) – Group G | 2 |
| March 8, 1998 | Kalamaria Stadium, Thessaloniki, Greece | Greece | 2–3 | 1999 FIFA Women's World Cup qualification (UEFA) – Group G | 1 |
| July 24, 1999 | Krajsnik Stadium, Velika Kladuša, Bosnia and Herzegovina | Bosnia and Herzegovina | 6–2 | 2001 UEFA Women's Championship qualification – Group 8 | 1 |
| May 13, 2000 | Ankara 19 Mayıs Stadium, Ankara, Turkey | Greece | 2–3 | 2001 UEFA Women's Championship qualification – Group 8 | 2 |
| March 24, 2002 | Vefa Stadium Istanbul, Turkey | Belarus | 1–5 | 2003 FIFA Women's World Cup qualification (UEFA) – Group 8 | 1 |
| May 2, 2002 | Stadion Rudara, Breza, Bosnia and Herzegovina | Bosnia and Herzegovina | 2–3 | 2003 FIFA Women's World Cup qualification (UEFA) – Group 8 | 1 |

- ^{†} Goals at international friendly matches not included.

== Honors ==
=== Club ===
Women's League Champion

- Dinarsuspor: 1996–97
