= Neslihan Muratdağı =

Turkish football referee

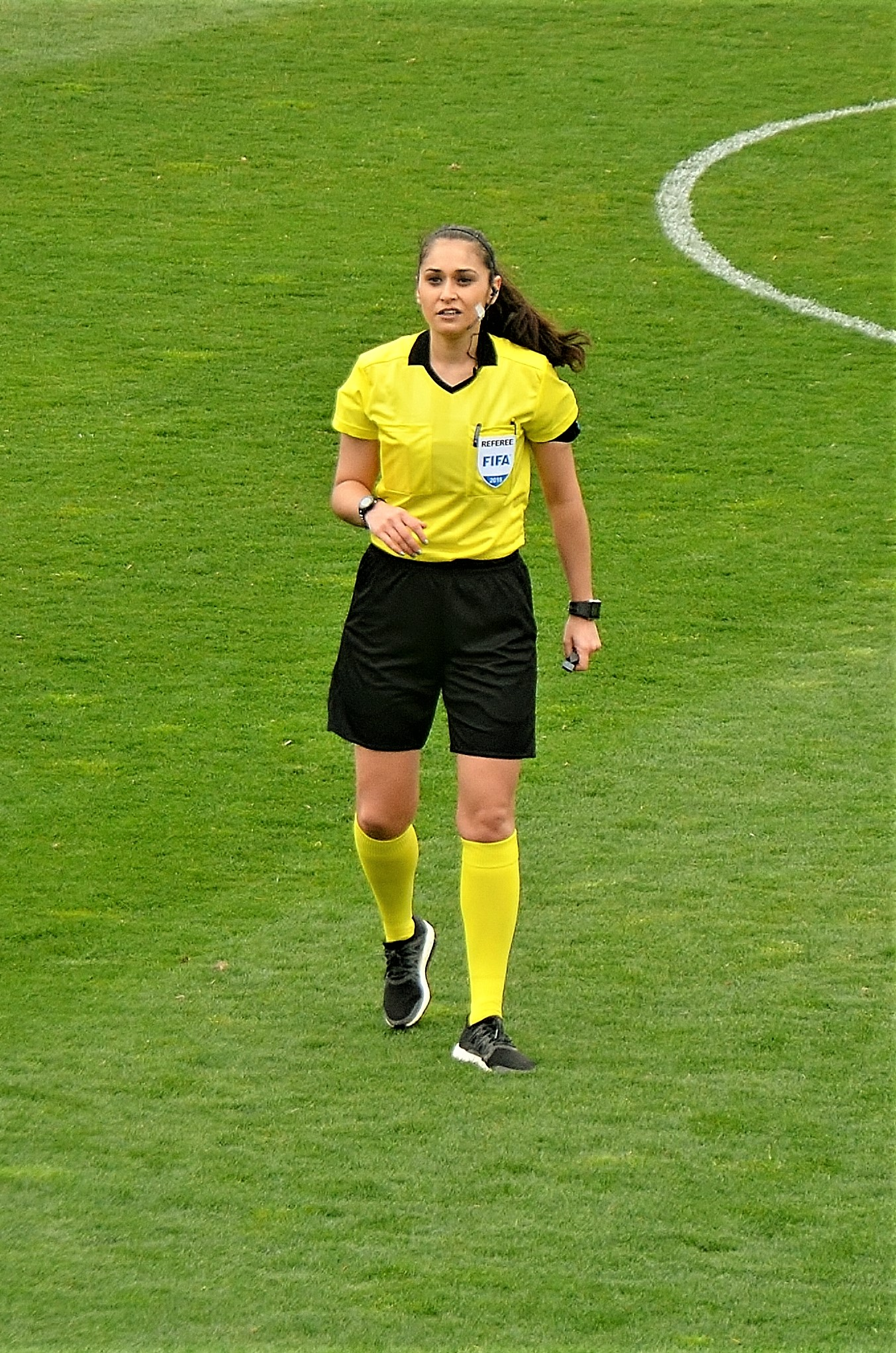
- Muratdağı in 2018
- Born: October 19, 1988 (age 38); Çorlu, Tekirdağ, Turkey
- Other occupation: Teacher

Neslihan Muratdağı (born October 19, 1988), is a Turkish FIFA listed football referee. She is a teacher of physical education by profession.

She was born in Çorlu, Tekirdağ on October 18, 1988.

== Referee career ==
=== Domestic matches ===
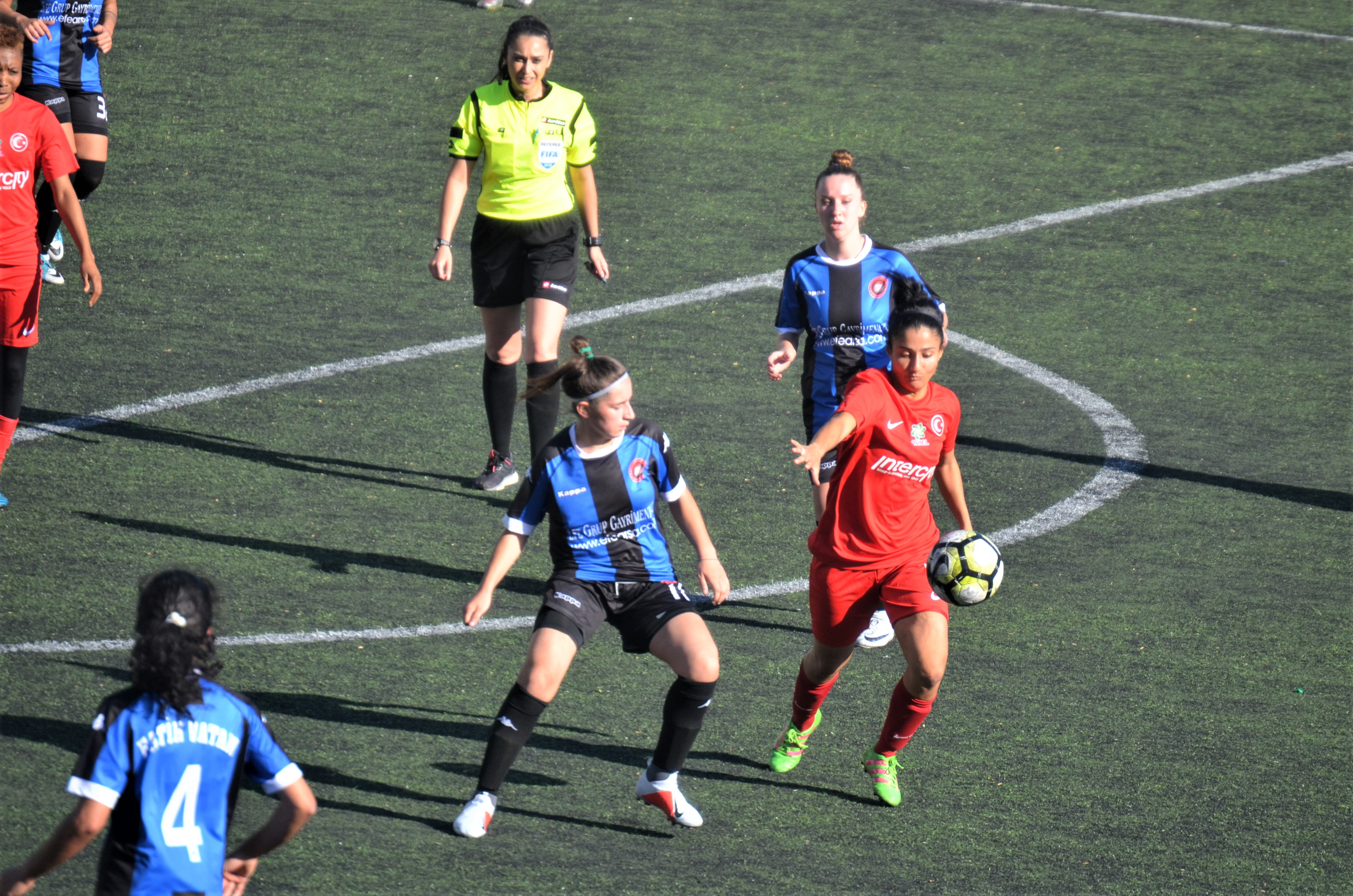
Neslihan Muratdağı officiating the 2018-19 Women's First League match Fatih Vatan Spor (blue/black) against Ataşehir Belediyespor (red) at the Fatih Mimar Sinan Stadium on 28 October 2018.

She has been serving as a football referee since 2009 in the Turkish football league system's Tekirdağ region. She officiates women's football matches in the Third, Second and First leagues, as well as men's matches in the Regional Amateur, TFF Third League and U21 leagues.

=== International matches ===
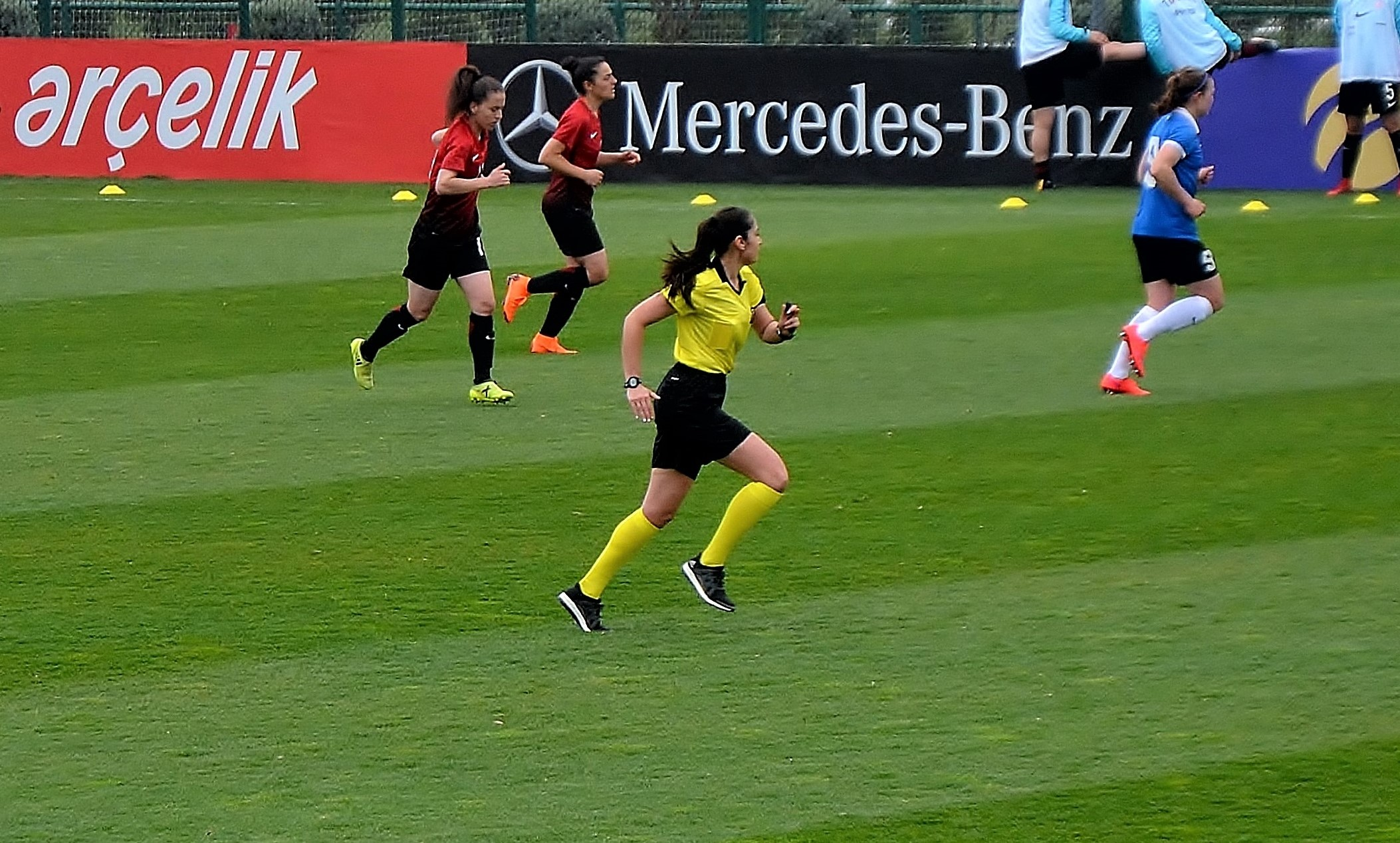
Neslihan Muratdağı officiating the friendly match Turkey women's national team (red/black) against Estonia (blue/black) at the TFF Riva Facility on 7 April 2018.

In 2014, she was nominated a FIFA-listed referee. She was appointed referee at the 2015 UEFA Women's Under-17 Special Preparation Tournament, UEFA Women's Under-17 Championship qualification matches of 2017 Group 11, 2018 Group 9 and 2019 Group 8. She was named referee at the 2019 World High School Football Championship held in Belgrade, Serbia. Muratdağı officiated the international friendly matches of women's teams Jordan vs Japan at Amman in November 2017, Jordan vs Taiwan at Amman in March 2018, and Turkey vs Estonia at Istanbul in April 2018. At the 2018–19 UEFA Women's Champions League knockout phase match of Brøndby vs LSK Kvinner, she served as the fourth official.
