= Leyla Güngör =

Turkish international women's footballer (born 1993)

Personal information
- Date of birth: May 29, 1993 (age 33)
- Place of birth: Malmö, Sweden
- Position: Defender

Team information
- Current team: FC Rosengård

Youth career
- 1998–2004: Türk Anadolu FF Malmö
- IF Limhamn Bunkeflo

Senior career*
Years	Team	Apps	(Gls)
2011	Kristianstads DFF		
2012–2014	IF Limhamn Bunkeflo		

International career^{‡}
2010	Turkey U-17	4	(1)
2010–2012	Turkey U-19	11	(7)
2010–2013	Turkey	15	(2)
- * Club domestic league appearances and goals as of December 3, 2013 ‡ National team caps and goals as of October 31, 2013

Leyla Güngör (born May 29, 1993) is a Turkish international women's footballer who plays as a defender in the Swedish Damallsvenskan for FC Rosengård. She is a member of the Turkish national team.

== Early life ==
Leyla Güngör was born on May 29, 1993, in Malmö, Sweden to a Turkish father and Swedish mother, as their second child.

== Playing career ==
=== Club ===
Leyla began playing football at the age of five following her older brother Sami's footsteps. She entered the Turkish community's sports club Türk Anadolu FF Malmö, a mixed-gender team. She was supported by her parents, and her grandfather took Leyla to training when her parents were at work. At the age eleven, she transferred to IF Limhamn Bunkeflo. Currently, she plays in the Swedish Women's First League team FC Rosengård, which is the third club in her career.

=== International ===
After playing some time in the Sweden women's national under-17 football team, Güngör received an invitation from the Turkish Football Federation to join the Turkey national team. Enthusiastically preferring the Turkish side, she promptly accepted. In the beginning, she communicated to the team in English, because she could not speak Turkish well but could understand it.

On September 11, 2010, she played for the first time in the Turkey U-19 national team at the 2011 UEFA Women's U-19 Championship First qualifying round – Group 9 against Romania, and scored both of the game's goals for her country.

Promoted to the Turkey women's national team in 2011, she scored the only goal for Turkey in her first appearance in the match against the Spanish side at the UEFA Women's Euro 2013 qualifying – Group 2.
