= Kocaeli Stadium =

Football field owned by Kocaelispor

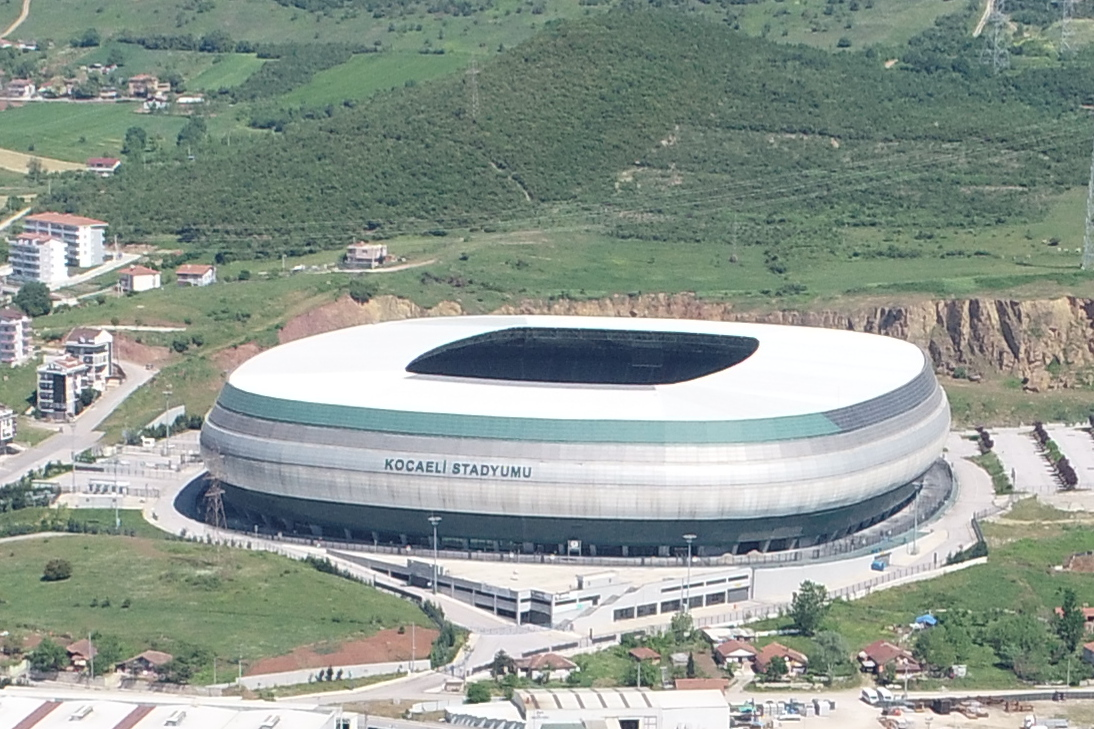

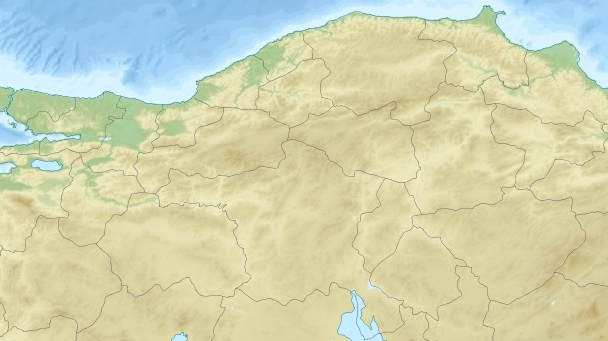
- Location in Northwestern Turkey Location in Turkey
- Location: İzmit, Turkey
- Coordinates: 40°46′29″N 30°1′3″E
- Operator: Kocaelispor
- Capacity: 34,829 Capacity history: 34,712 (2018–2024) 34,829 (2024–)
- Executive suites: 48
- Record attendance: 32,037 (Kocaelispor–Galatasaray, 9 November 2025)

Construction
- Groundbreaking: 2014
- Opened: 2018
- Architect: Alper Aksoy

Tenants
- Kocaelispor (2018–present); Turkey national football team (selected matches)

Kocaeli Stadium is a stadium in İzmit, Turkey. It was opened to public in 2018 with a capacity of 34,829 spectators. It is the new home of Kocaelispor. It replaced the club's previous home stadium, İzmit İsmetpaşa Stadium.

== History ==
The stadium is part of a project for constructing and modernizing sports venues led by Turkey's Ministry of Youth and Sports, aimed at making the country an attractive destination for continental and global sports events.

The original design was developed in 2013 by a team of architects led by renowned Turkish architect Alper Aksoy. Construction began in the summer of the same year. Significant earth removal was required to adapt the hillside and include an underground parking lot in the stadium design. Initially scheduled for completion in 2016, the project faced delays due to construction setbacks and rising material costs. The stadium was officially inaugurated on 1 September 2018, with a match between Kocaelispor and Fatsa Belediyespor. Kocaelispor won the match 2–0 in a game held as part of the Turkish Third Division.

== International events hosted ==
On 8 October 2019, the stadium hosted the UEFA Women's Euro 2021 qualifying Group A match of Turkey against Slovenia.
