= Seval Kıraç =

Turkish footballer (born 1988)

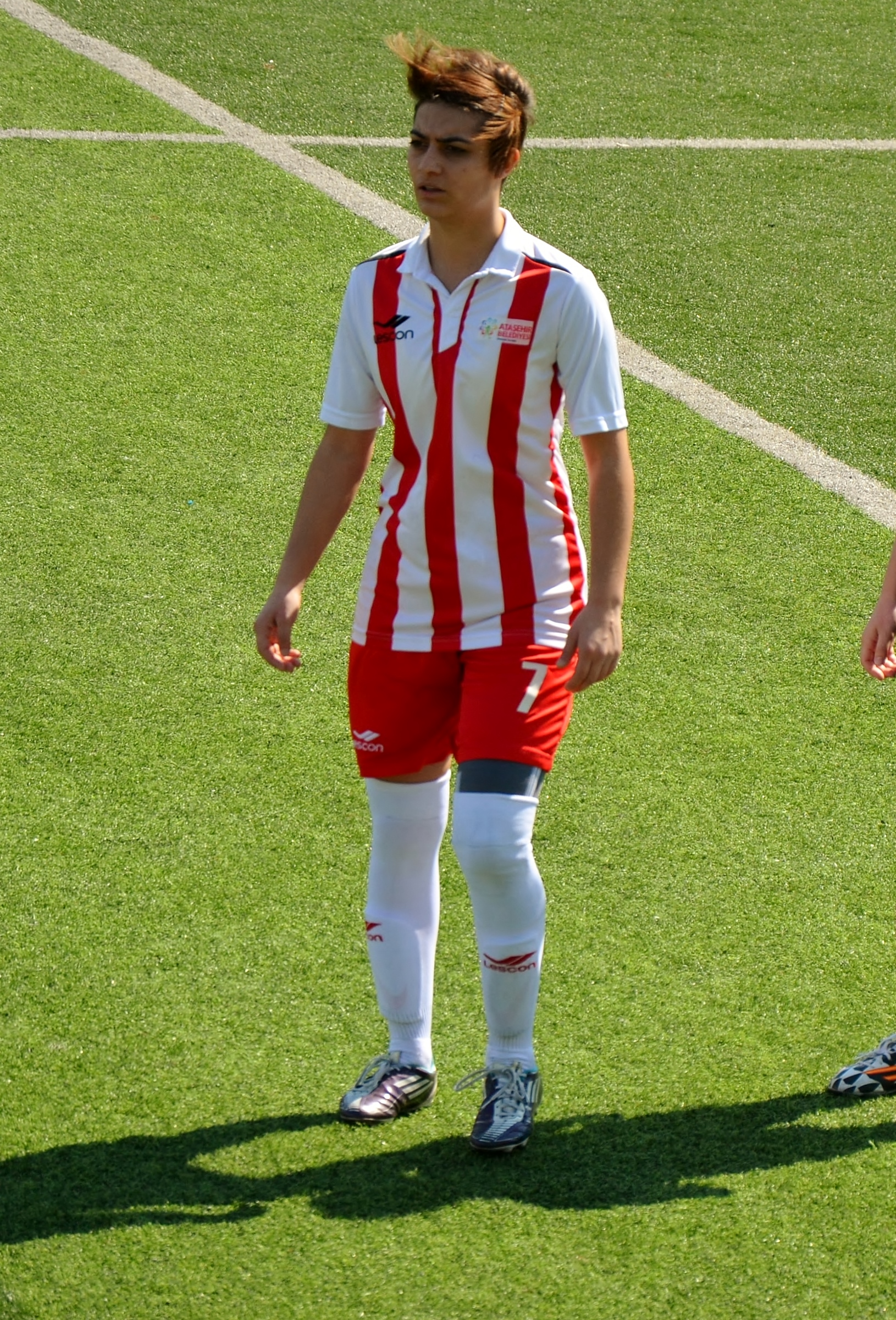
- Seval Kıraç playing for Ataşehir Belediyespor in the 2014–15 season.

Personal information
- Full name: Seval Kıraç
- Date of birth: April 28, 1988 (age 38)
- Place of birth: Gebze, Kocaeli Province, Turkey
- Position: Forward

Team information
- Current team: Konak Belediyespor
- Number: 7

Senior career*
Years	Team	Apps	(Gls)
2008–2009	Kartalspor	16	(28)
2009–2011	Yalıspor	25	(52)
2011–2017	Ataşehir Belediyesi	67	(18)
2011–2018	Trabzon İdmanocağı	13	(3)
2018–2019	ALG Spor	17	(2)
2019–	Konak Belediyespor	21	(3)

International career^{‡}
2006	Turkey U-17	1	(0)
2006–2007	Turkey U-19	13	(0)
2006–2014	Turkey	25	(3)
- * Club domestic league appearances and goals as of 16 January 2022 ‡ National team caps and goals as of 4 April 2014

Seval Kıraç (born April 28, 1988) is a Turkish women's football forward currently playing in the Turkish Women's First Football League for Kpnak Belediyespor with jersey number 7. She made her Champions League debut in August 2011 with her current club. She played in the Turkey women's U-19 national team before joining the Turkish women's national team.

== Playing career ==
=== Club ===
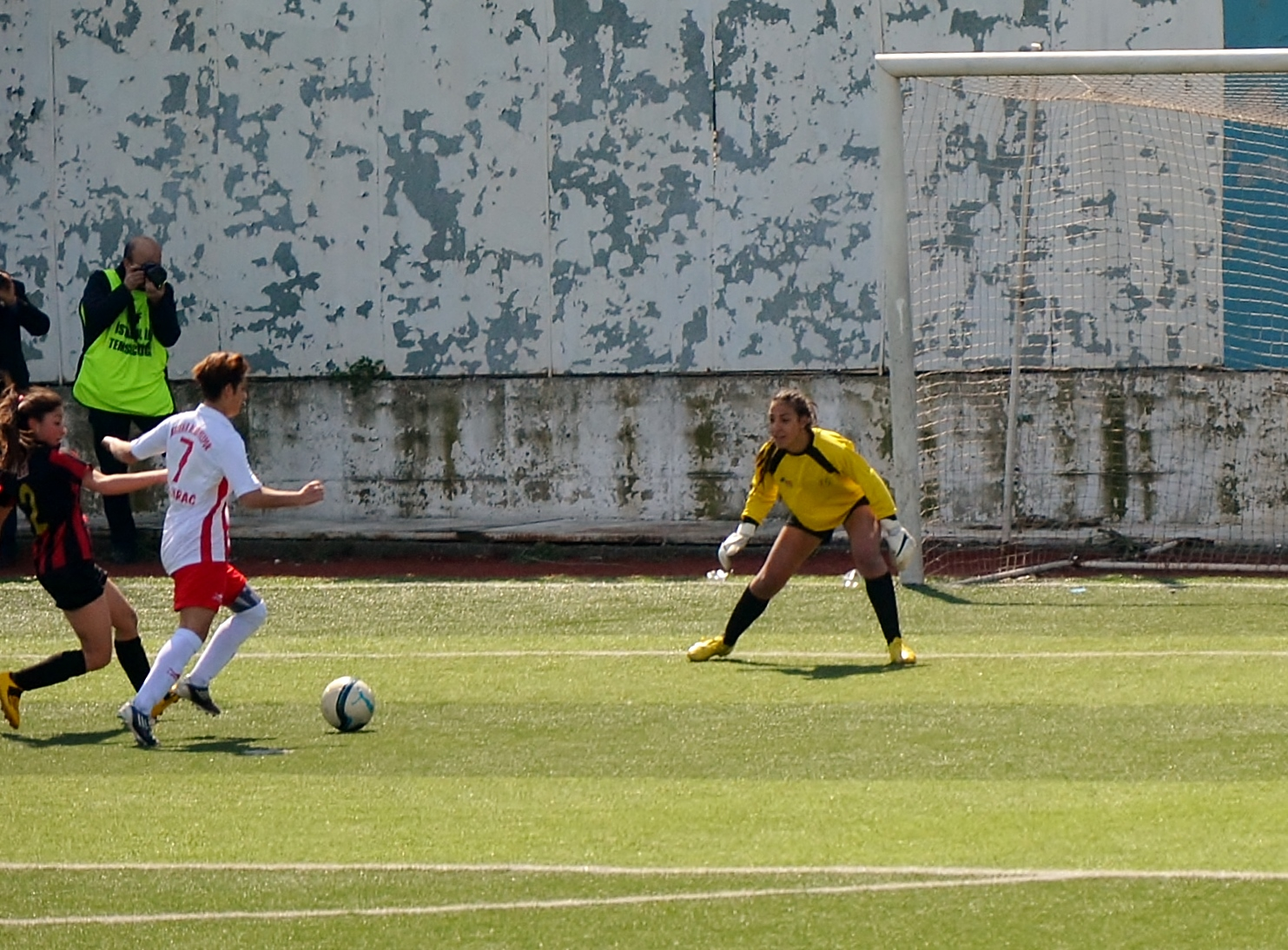
Seval Kıraç attacking Eskişehirspor in the 2014–15 season.

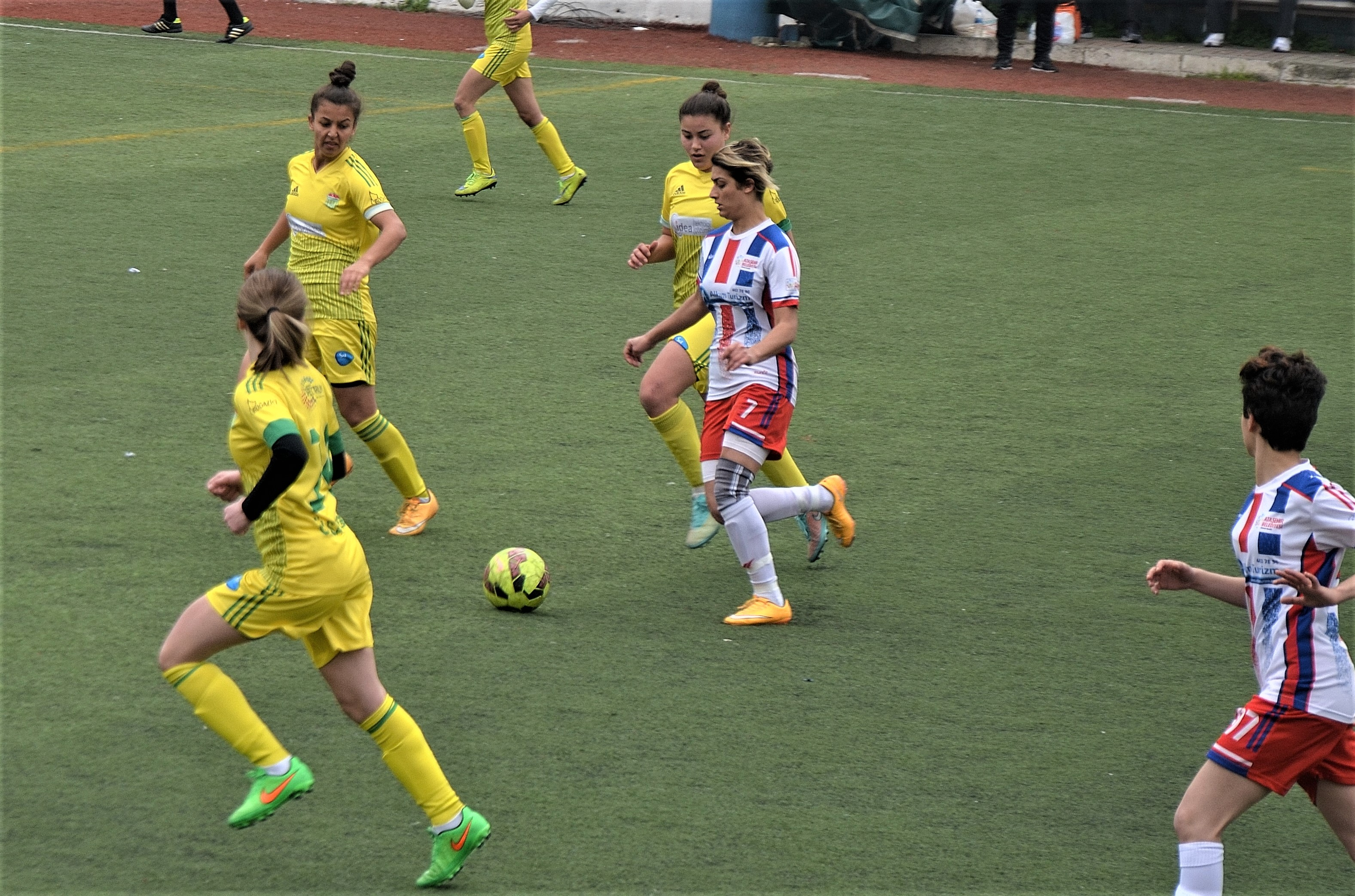
Seval Kıraç (white/red mid ) attacking Kireçburnu Spor in the 2015–16 season.

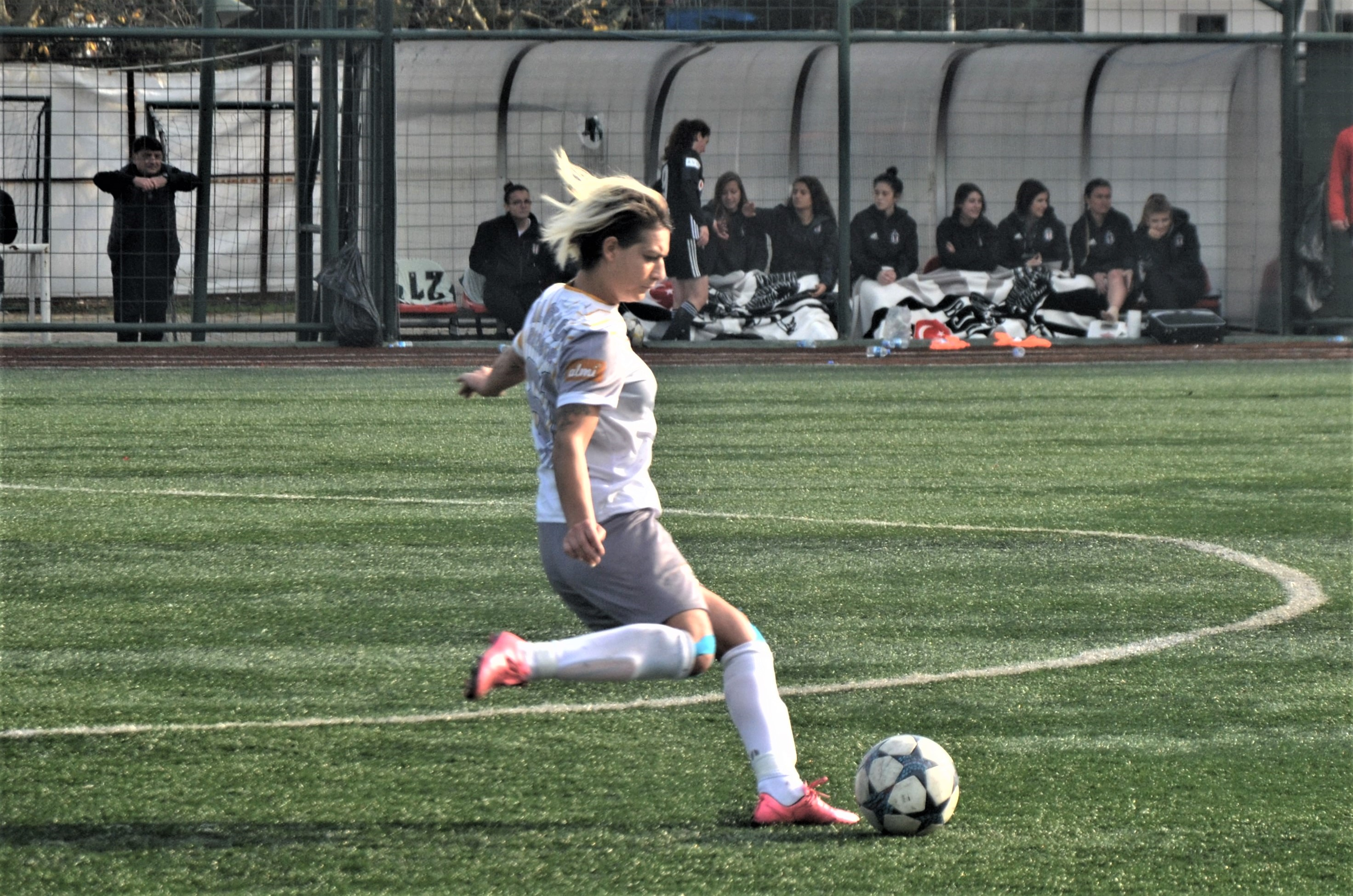
Seval Kıraç of ALG Spor in the 2018–19 Women's League.

Seval Kıraç began football playing in Yalıspor, a club in Maltepe district of Istanbul, by receiving her license on May 5, 2000. She took part in the youth teams until she transferred to Kartalspor on February 28, 2006. At Kartalspor in Kartal, she played until October 16, 2009, and returned then to her first club Yalıspor. After two seasons, Kıraç signed for Ataşehir Belediyesi on August 5, 2011.

Kıraç debuted in the 2011-12 UEFA Women's Champions League match against Lithuanian champion Gintra Universitetas on August 11, 2011. In the 2011–12 season, she enjoyed Women's First League championship with her team, and played in the 2012-13 UEFA Women's Champions League qualifying matches for Ataşehir Belediyesi once again.

In October 2018, she joined the recently to the Women's First League promoted club ALG Spor in Gaziantep. In the 2019-20 Women's First League season, she transferred to Konak Belediyespor.

=== International ===
She made her debut in the Turkey women's national U-19 team in the UEFA European Women's Under-19 Championship's first qualifying round match against Swiss junior women on September 26, 2006.

Admitted first time to the Turkey women's national team, she played in the match against Georgia on November 23, 2006, at which she scored also one of the nine goals for Turkey.

During the UEFA Support International Tournament in 2008, she netted each one goal in the games against Croatia and Latvia.

In the UEFA Women's Euro 2009 qualifying match against Spanish team, which ended as a 0–4 defeat for Turkey, she scored an own goal.

International goals
Date	Venue	Opponent	Result	Competition	Scored
November 23, 2006	Adana 5 Ocak Stadium, Adana, Turkey	Georgia	9–0	UEFA Women's Euro 2009 qualifying	1
December 15, 2008	Sakarya Atatürk Stadium Adapazarı, Turkey	Croatia	2–2	3rd UEFA Support International Tournament	1
December 19, 2008	İsmet Paşa Stadium İzmit, Turkey	Latvia	5–0	3rd UEFA Support International Tournament	1
June 21, 2012	La Ciudad del Fútbol, Madrid, Spain	Spain	0–4	UEFA Women's Euro 2009 qualifying	1 o.g.

== Career statistics ==
As of 16 January 2022.

Club	Season	League			Continental		National		Total	
Club	Season	Division	Apps	Goals	Apps	Goals	Apps	Goals	Apps	Goals
Kartalspor	2006–2009	First League	16	28	–	–	22	3	38	31
Kartalspor	Total		16	28	–	–	22	3	38	31
Maltepe Yalıspor	2009–10	Second League	17	50	–	–	5	0	22	50
Maltepe Yalıspor	2010–11	First League	8	2	–	–	2	0	10	2
Maltepe Yalıspor	Total		25	52	–	–	7	0	32	52
Ataşehir Belediyespor	2011–12	First League	14	3	3	0	5	1	22	3
Ataşehir Belediyespor	2012–13	First League	2	1	3	0	2	0	7	1
Ataşehir Belediyespor	2013–14	First League	11	0	–	–	1	0	12	0
Ataşehir Belediyespor	2014–15	First League	4	2	–	–	0	0	4	2
Ataşehir Belediyespor	2015–16	First League	18	10	–	–	0	0	18	10
Ataşehir Belediyespor	2016–17	First League	18	2	–	–	0	0	18	2
Ataşehir Belediyespor	Total		67	18	6	0	8	1	81	19
Trabzon İdmanocağı	2017–18	First League	13	3	–	–	0	0	13	3
Trabzon İdmanocağı	Total		13	3	–	–	0	0	13	3
ALG Spor	2018–19	First League	17	2	–	–	0	0	17	2
ALG Spor	Total		17	2	–	–	0	0	17	2
Konak Belediyespor	2019–20	First League	13	0	–	–	0	0	13	0
Konak Belediyespor	2020–21	First League	4	3	–	–	0	0	4	3
Konak Belediyespor	2021–22	Super League	4	0	–	–	0	0	4	0
Konak Belediyespor	Total		21	3	–	–	0	0	21	3
Career total			159	106	6	0	37	4	202	110

== Honours ==
Turkish Women's First League=

Ataşehir Belediyespor
Winners (1): 2011–12
Runners-up (4): 2012–13, 2013–14, 2014–15, 2015–16
Third places (1): 2016–17

ALG Spor
Runners-up (1): 2018–19

Konak Belediyespor
Third places (1): 2019–20
