= Miray Cin =

Turkish footballer (born 2001)

Personal information
- Date of birth: 5 July 2001 (age 25)
- Place of birth: Bottrop, Germany
- Height: 1.68 m (5 ft 6 in)
- Position: Midfielder

Team information
- Current team: ABB Fomget

Youth career
- 2015–2018: SGS Essen U17

Senior career*
Years	Team	Apps	(Gls)
2018–2020	VfL Wolfsburg II	17	(2)
2020–2024	MSV Duisburg	71	(3)
2024	SC Freiburg	5	(0)
2024	SC Freiburg II	3	(0)
2025–2026	Borussia Mönchengladbach	32	(4)
2026–	ABB Fomget	0	(0)

International career^{‡}
2015–2016	Germany U15	4	(1)
2016	Germany U16	2	(0)
2017–2018	Germany U17	8	(0)
2021–	Turkey	32	(3)
- * Club domestic league appearances and goals as of 31 July 2026 ‡ National team caps and goals as of 3 June 2025

Miray Cin (born 5 July 2001) is a footballer who plays as a midfielder for Turkish Super League club ABB Fomget. Born in Germany, she represents Turkey at international level, having previously been a member of the Germany national U15, U16, and U17 teams.

== Personal life ==
Miray Cin was born in Bottrop, Germany on 5 July 2001. The 1.68 m (5 ft 6 in)-tall sportswoman is a dual citizen of the Federal Republic of Germany and the Republic of Turkey. She has two brothers, Oktay and Alpay.

== Club career ==
Cin started her football career joining the under-17 team of SGS Essen in 2015. She has appeared in 28 games in three seasons, and has scored 11 goals. She was selected to the regional teams of Niederrhein U14 in 2015 playing in two matches, in U16 in 2016 playing in two matches, and U18 in 2017 appearing in five games.

In the 2018–19 season, she moved to the reserve team of German top-level VfL Wolfsburg women's football team, where she netted two goals in 11 matches over two seasons. She then transferred to the Frauen-Bundesliga club MSV Duisburg by August 2020. In the 2020–21 season, she played in 7 matches and scored one goal. Following MSV's relegation and withdrawal from professional football in the summer of 2024, the players' contracts were terminated.

On 29 August 2024, SC Freiburg announced her signing.

ON 30 January 2025, she moved to Borussia Mönchengladbach in the 2. Frauen-Bundesliga.

On 31 July 2026, she transferred to ABB Fomget in the Turkish Super League.

== International career ==
=== Germany ===
Cin played in four matches for the Germany U15 team scoring a goal between 2015 and 2016, and two matches for the Germany U16 team in 2016. At the end of February 2018, she was called up to the Germany U17 team, and appeared also in seven games of the Germany U17 team.

=== Turkey ===
She was called up to the Turkey national team by September 2021. She internationally debuted in the 2023 FIFA World Cup qualification – UEFA Group H match against Portugal on 16 September 2021. She played in the international friendly match against Ukraine, Later, she took part at the matches against the Bulgarian and Serbian national teams in the 2023 World Cup qualification tournament.

== International goals ==
No.	Date	Venue	Opponent	Score	Result	Competition
1.	22 September 2023	Mikheil Meskhi Stadium, Tbilisi, Georgia	Georgia	1–0	3–0	2023–24 UEFA Women's Nations League
2.	9 April 2024	Pendik Stadyumu, Istanbul, Turkey	Hungary	2–1	2–1	UEFA Women's Euro 2025 qualifying
