= Marie-Andrea Egli =

Swiss footballer (born 1989)

Personal information
- Full name: Marie-Andrea Egli
- Date of birth: 11 January 1989 (age 37)
- Place of birth: Switzerland
- Position: Defender

Team information
- Current team: Kriens

Senior career*
Years	Team	Apps	(Gls)
2004–	Kriens		

International career
2008–	Switzerland	28	(0)
- * Club domestic league appearances and goals

Marie-Andrea Egli is a Swiss football defender currently playing for SC Kriens in the Nationalliga A. She has been a member of the Swiss national team since 2008.
