= Burcu Düner =

German-born Turkish footballer

Personal information
- Full name: Jennifer Burcu Düner
- Date of birth: 20 August 1979 (age 47)
- Place of birth: Menden (Sauerland), NRW, West Germany
- Height: 1.63 m (5 ft 4 in)
- Position: Midfielder

Senior career*
Years	Team	Apps	(Gls)
1999–2001	FFC Flaesheim-Hillen	26	(4)
2001–2004	FFC Heike Rheine	39	(14)
2007–2008	SG Wattenscheid 09	10	(1)
2008–2009	Sakarya Yenikent Güneşspor	8	(0)
2009–2011	Bursa Sağlıkgücü Gençlikspor	21	(9)

International career
1997	Germany U19		
2007–2010	Turkey	8	(2)
- * Club domestic league appearances and goals

Jennifer Burcu Düner (born 20 August 1979), known as Jennifer Düner in Germany and Burcu Düner in Turkey, is a former footballer who played as a midfielder. After playing in German clubs she moved to Turkey. Born in Germany, she made eight appearances the Turkey national team scoring two goals.

== Club career ==
Düner played in Germany for the Frauen-Bundesliga clubs FFC Flaesheim-Hillen (1999–2001), FFC Heike Rheine (2001–2004) and SG Wattenscheid 09 (2007–2008) in the forward position.

She received her license in Turkey on 4 February 2009 from Sakarya Yenikent Güneşspor, where she played until October that year. For the 2009–10 season, Burcu Düner transferred to Bursa Sağlıkgücü Gençlikspor. There, she played two seasons.

== International career ==
Düner made her international debut in the Germany U-19 team at the UEFA Under-19 European Championship play-off match against Poland on 14 October 1997.

Burcu Düner was called up to the Turkey national team, and debuted in the 2011 FIFA World Cup qualification – UEFA Group 5 match against Malta on 27 March 2010. She capped one more time at the same tournament.

== Career statistics ==
Appearances and goals by club, season and competition
Club	Season	League			Continental		National cup		Total		
Club	Season	Division	Apps	Goals	Apps	Goals	Apps	Goals	Apps	Goals	
FFC Flaesheim-Hillen	1999–00	Frauen-Bundesliga	14	4	0	0	0	0	14	4	
FFC Flaesheim-Hillen	2000–01	Frauen-Bundesliga	12	0	0	0	0	0	12	0	
FFC Flaesheim-Hillen	Total		26	4	0	0	0	0	26	4	
FFC Heike Rheine	2001–02	Frauen-Bundesliga	15	3	0	0	0	0	15	3	
FFC Heike Rheine	2002–03	Frauen-Bundesliga	3	1	–		–	0	0	3	1
FFC Heike Rheine	2003–04	Frauen-Bundesliga	21	10	0	0	0	0	21	10	
FFC Heike Rheine	Total		39	14	0	0	0	0	39	14	
SG Wattenscheid 09	2007–08	Frauen-Bundesliga	10	1	0	0	0	0	10	1	
Sakarya Yenikent Güneşspor	2008–09	First League	8	0	0	0	0	0	8	0	
Bursa Sağlıkgücü Gençlikspor	2009–10	Regional League	6	0	0	0	0	0	6	0	
Bursa Sağlıkgücü Gençlikspor	2010–11	Second League	15	9	0	0	2	0	17	11	
Bursa Sağlıkgücü Gençlikspor	Total		21	9	0	0	2	0	23	11	
Career total			104	28	0	0	2	0	106	30	
