= Melahat Eryurt =

Turkish footballer (born 1975)

Personal information
- Date of birth: 27 October 1975 (age 51)
- Place of birth: Hannover, West Germany
- Position: Striker

International career
Years	Team	Apps	(Gls)
1995–2002	Turkey	39	(18)

Melahat Eryurt (October 27, 1975 in Hannover, West Germany) is a Turkish female footballer. A member of the Turkey women's national football team, she is the most capped player with 39 matches and the top scorer with 18 goals, as of March 2010.

== Clubs played ==
- Acarlarspor (1995)
- Dinarsuspor, Istanbul (1997)
- Marshall Boyaspor, Istanbul (1999-2001)
- Zeytinburnuspor, Zeytinburnu-Istanbul (2001)
- Yalıspor, Maltepe-Istanbul (2002)
- Kuzeyspor, Bostancı-Istanbul (2002)

== International goals ==
No.	Date	Venue	Opponent	Score	Result	Competition
1.	9 February 1998	Netanya, Israel	Israel	2–?	5–2	Friendly
2.	9 February 1998	Netanya, Israel	Israel	4–?	5–2	Friendly
3.	9 February 1998	Netanya, Israel	Israel	5–?	5–2	Friendly
4.	11 February 1998	Netanya, Israel	Israel	2–0	8–0	Friendly
5.	11 February 1998	Netanya, Israel	Israel	7–0	8–0	Friendly
6.	11 February 1998	Netanya, Israel	Israel	8–0	8–0	Friendly
7.	8 March 1998	Thessaloniki, Greece	Greece	2–1	2–3	1999 FIFA Women's World Cup qualification
8.	1 August 1998	Liptovský Mikuláš, Slovakia	Israel	2–0	3–0	Friendly
9.	1 July 1999	Istanbul, Turkey	Israel	?–?	3–1	Friendly
10.	24 July 1999	Velika Kladuša, Bosnia & Herzegovina	Bosnia and Herzegovina	2–?	6–2	UEFA Women's Euro 2001 qualifying
11.	24 July 1999	Velika Kladuša, Bosnia & Herzegovina	Bosnia and Herzegovina	3–?	6–2	UEFA Women's Euro 2001 qualifying
12.	16 February 2000	Istanbul, Turkey	Bosnia and Herzegovina	1–?	3–1	UEFA Women's Euro 2001 qualifying
13.	16 February 2000	Istanbul, Turkey	Bosnia and Herzegovina	2–?	3–1	UEFA Women's Euro 2001 qualifying
