= Buca Arena =

Football stadium in İzmir, Turkey

- Interactive map of Buca Arena
- Full name: Buca Arena
- Location: Buca, İzmir, Turkey
- Coordinates: 38°23′42″N 27°11′34″E
- Capacity: 8,810
- Surface: Grass

Construction
- Groundbreaking: 2008
- Opened: 2009
- Cost: 14,500,000 TL
- Architect: Cemil Şeboy

Tenants
- Bucaspor (2009–2019); Bucaspor 1928 (2019–present)

Buca Arena is a football stadium in İzmir and is located near to Yedigöller, north of Buca. Construction began in 2008; the opening ceremony of the new stadium was in 2009. The official capacity of Buca Arena is 8,810. Near the stadium, a carpet area, two basketball courts, jogging paths and a 300 car parking lot are located.

Bucaspor played its first official match at the stadium against Çorumspor on 18 January 2009.
