= İzmit İsmetpaşa Stadium =

Football stadium in Derince, İzmit, Turkey

- İzmit İsmetpaşa Stadyumu
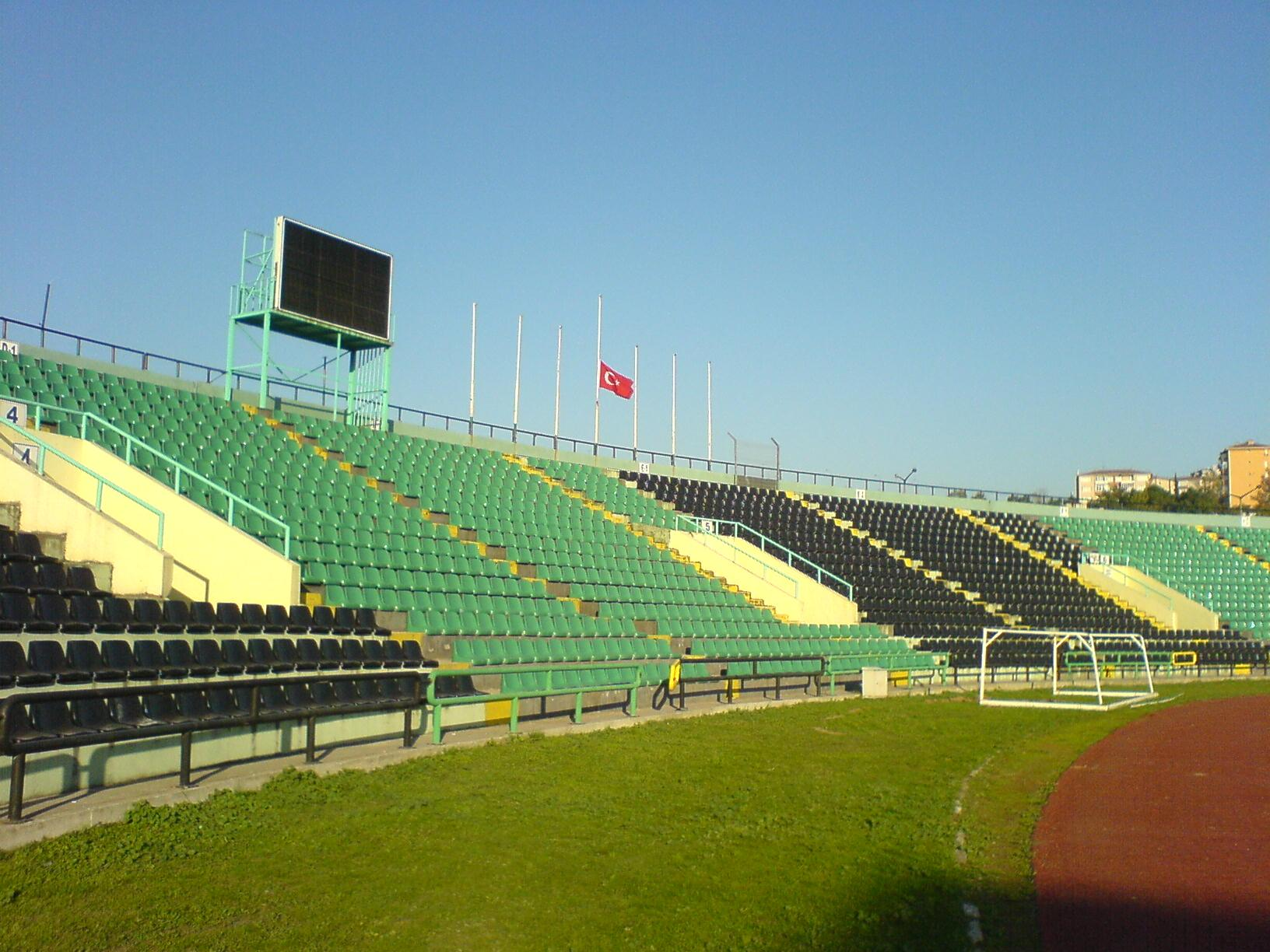
- İzmit İsmetpaşa Stadium

- Location of İzmit İsmetpaşa Stadium in Turkey.
- Location: Derince, İzmit, Kocaeli Province, Turkey
- Coordinates: 40.7631°N 29.8542°E -->
- Owner: Kocaeli Sports and Youth Services Directorate
- Capacity: 15,462
- Surface: grass

Construction
- Opened: 1972; 54 years ago

Tenant
- Kocaelispor

İzmit İsmetpaşa Stadium (Turkish: İzmit İsmetpaşa Stadyumu) was a multi-purpose stadium in the Derince district of İzmit in Kocaeli Province, Turkey. It was named after the Turkish general and statesman İsmet İnönü (1884–1973), widely known as İsmet Pasha.

Built in 1972, it was situated on the Istanbul-İzmit highway D.100. The stadium held 15,462 spectators, and was primarily used for football matches as the home stadium of Kocaelispor.

== Demolition ==
In 2013, it was announced that the stadium's estate was handed over to Public Works and the stadium will be demolished in order to make place for residences and a shopping mall. A new stadium, İzmit Stadium, with 33,000 seating capacity was built in Alikahya neighborhood of Kartepe district. The demolition works are scheduled to start in June 2015.
