= 2019–20 LEN Euro League Women =

European water polo tournament

- League: LEN Euro League Women
- Sport: Water Polo
- Duration: 31 October 2019 – 25 April 2020
- Number of teams: 22 (from 10 countries)

Euro League Women seasons
- ← 2018–19 2020−21 →

The 2019–20 LEN Euro League Women was the 33rd edition of the major competition for European women's water polo clubs. It is started on 31 October 2019 and it was scheduled to end with the Final 4 on 24 and 25 April 2020.

== Overview ==
=== Calendar ===
The calendar of the tournament was announced by LEN on 11 June 2019.

Phase	Round	First leg	Second leg
Qualifying phase	Qualification round	1–3 November 2019	
Qualifying phase	Preliminary round	29 November–1 December 2019	
Knockout stage	Quarterfinals	8 February 2020	28 March 2020
Knockout stage	Final 4	24–25 April 2020	

=== Teams ===
Qualification round
(France) Lille UC	(Hungary) UVSE	(Netherlands) ZV De Zaan	(Spain) CE Mediterrani
(Germany) Spandau 04	(Italy) Plebiscito Padova	(Netherlands) ZVL-1886	(Spain) CN Mataró
(Hungary) BVSC	(Italy) SIS Roma	(Russia) Dynamo Uralochka	(Spain) CN Sant Andreu
(Hungary) Dunaújváros	(Malta) Exiles SC	(Russia) Kinef Kirishi	
(Hungary) Ferencváros	(Netherlands) UZSC Utrecht	(Slovakia) Olympia Košice	
Preliminary round
(Greece) NC Vouliagmeni	(Greece) Olympiacos	(Italy) Orizzonte Catania	(Spain) CN Sabadell

== Qualifying stage ==
=== Qualification round ===
==== Pools composition ====
The draw was held in Volos (Greece) on 8 September 2019, during the 2019 Women's LEN European Junior Water Polo Championship.

Group A	Group B	Group C	Group D
(Hungary) Dunaújváros	(Spain) CN Sant Andreu	(Hungary) BVSC	(Spain) CN Mataró
(Malta) Exiles SC	(France) Lille UC	(Spain) CE Mediterrani	(Russia) Dynamo Uralochka
(Russia) Kinef Kirishi	(Hungary) UVSE (H)	(Slovakia) Olympia Košice	(Hungary) Ferencváros
(Italy) SIS Roma (H)	(Netherlands) ZVL-1886	(Italy) Plebiscito Padova	(Netherlands) UZSC Utrecht (H)
(Netherlands) ZV De Zaan		(Germany) Spandau 04 (H)	

==== Group A ====
Venue: Polo Natatorio di Ostia, Ostia (Rome), Italy.

Pos	Team	Pld	W	D	L	GF	GA	GD	Pts	Qualification
1	(Hungary) Dunaújváros	4	3	1	0	54	30	+24	10	Preliminary round
2	(Russia) Kinef Kirishi	4	3	0	1	68	35	+33	9	Preliminary round
3	(Italy) SIS Roma	4	2	1	1	55	31	+24	7	Preliminary round
4	(Netherlands) ZV De Zaan	4	1	0	3	61	45	+16	3	
5	(Malta) Exiles SC	4	0	0	4	11	106	−95	0	

Source: LEN

Date	Time^{†}		Score		
31 Oct	18:00	ZV De Zaan	11–19	Kinef	Report
31 Oct	19:45	SIS Roma	29–2	Exiles	Report
1 Nov	10:00	Dunaújváros	12–10	ZV De Zaan	Report
1 Nov	11:45	Kinef	31–3	Exiles	Report
1 Nov	18:00	Kinef	8–14	Dunaújváros	Report
1 Nov	19:45	SIS Roma	13–12	ZV De Zaan	Report
2 Nov	18:00	Exiles	5–21	Dunaújváros	Report
2 Nov	19:45	SIS Roma	9–10	Kinef	Report
3 Nov	10:00	ZV De Zaan	28–1	Exiles	Report
3 Nov	11:45	Dunaújváros	7–7	SIS Roma	Report

==== Group B ====
Venue: Alfréd Hajós National Swimming Stadium, Budapest, Hungary.

Pos	Team	Pld	W	D	L	GF	GA	GD	Pts	Qualification
1	(Hungary) UVSE	3	3	0	0	52	25	+27	9	Preliminary round
2	(Spain) CN Sant Andreu	3	2	0	1	25	24	+1	6	Preliminary round
3	(Netherlands) ZVL-1886	3	1	0	2	19	29	−10	3	Preliminary round
4	(France) Lille UC	3	0	0	3	21	39	−18	0	

Source: LEN

Date	Time^{†}		Score		
1 Nov	17:00	Sant Andreu	7–5	ZVL	Report
1 Nov	18:45	UVSE	23–9	Lille	Report
2 Nov	17:00	Lille	7–8	ZVL	Report
2 Nov	18:45	UVSE	14–10	Sant Andreu	Report
3 Nov	11:00	Sant Andreu	8–5	Lille	Report
3 Nov	12:45	UVSE	15–6	ZVL	Report

==== Group C ====
Venue: Schöneberger Schwimmsporthalle, Berlin, Germany.

Pos	Team	Pld	W	D	L	GF	GA	GD	Pts	Qualification
1	(Italy) Plebiscito Padova	4	4	0	0	60	25	+35	12	Preliminary round
2	(Spain) CE Mediterrani	4	3	0	1	58	42	+16	9	Preliminary round
3	(Hungary) BVSC	4	2	0	2	55	36	+19	6	Preliminary round
4	(Germany) Spandau 04	4	1	0	3	36	53	−17	3	
5	(Slovakia) Olympia Košice	4	0	0	4	21	74	−53	0	

Source: LEN

Date	Time^{†}		Score		
31 Oct	19:00	Spandau	8–17	Mediterrani	Report
31 Oct	20:30	BVSC	24–1	Olympia	Report
1 Nov	19:00	Spandau	16–8	Olympia	Report
1 Nov	20:30	Plebiscito	14–7	Mediterrani	Report
2 Nov	10:00	BVSC	8–14	Plebiscito	Report
2 Nov	11:30	Mediterrani	20–7	Olympia	Report
2 Nov	18:00	Spandau	5–8	Plebiscito	Report
2 Nov	19:30	Mediterrani	14–13	BVSC	Report
3 Nov	10:00	Olympia	5–14	Plebiscito	Report
3 Nov	11:30	Spandau	7–10	BVSC	Report

==== Group D ====
Venue: Zwembad de Krommerijn, Utrecht, Netherlands.

Pos	Team	Pld	W	D	L	GF	GA	GD	Pts	Qualification
1	(Russia) Dynamo Uralochka	3	2	0	1	36	27	+9	6	Preliminary round
2	(Netherlands) UZSC Utrecht	3	2	0	1	44	29	+15	6	Preliminary round
3	(Spain) CN Mataró	3	2	0	1	29	31	−2	6	Preliminary round
4	(Hungary) Ferencváros	3	0	0	3	28	40	−12	0	

Source: LEN

Date	Time^{†}		Score		
1 Nov	19:00	Utrecht	14–11	Ferencváros	Report
1 Nov	20:30	Mataró	7–14	Uralochka	Report
2 Nov	17:30	Ferencváros	10–14	Mataró	Report
2 Nov	19:00	Utrecht	13–10	Uralochka	Report
3 Nov	12:30	Ferencváros	7–12	Uralochka	Report
3 Nov	14:00	Utrecht	7–8	Mataró	Report

^{†} All times are local

=== Preliminary round ===
The draw was held at LEN offices in Nyon, Switzerland, on 5 November 2019.

==== Pools composition ====
Group E	Group F	Group G	Group H
(Hungary) Dunaújváros	(Spain) CN Sabadell (H)	(Russia) Kinef Kirishi (H)	(Hungary) BVSC
(Spain) CE Mediterrani	(Italy) SIS Roma	(Greece) NC Vouliagmeni	(Spain) CN Sant Andreu
(Spain) CN Mataró	(Hungary) UVSE	(Italy) Plebiscito Padova	(Russia) Dynamo Uralochka
(Greece) Olympiacos (H)	(Netherlands) UZSC Utrecht	(Netherlands) ZVL-1886	(Italy) Orizzonte Catania (H)

==== Group E ====
Venue: Papastratio Petros Kapagerov National Swimming Hall, Piraeus, Greece.

Pos	Team	Pld	W	D	L	GF	GA	GD	Pts	Qualification
1	(Greece) Olympiacos	3	3	0	0	37	25	+12	9	Quarterfinals
2	(Hungary) Dunaújváros	3	2	0	1	33	28	+5	6	Quarterfinals
3	(Spain) CN Mataró	3	1	0	2	31	37	−6	3	
4	(Spain) CE Mediterrani	3	0	0	3	24	35	−11	0	

Source: LEN

Date	Time^{†}		Score		
29 Nov	18:30	Olympiacos	13–8	Mediterrani	Report
29 Nov	20:15	Dunaújváros	15–10	Mataró	Report
30 Nov	18:30	Olympiacos	10–8	Dunaújváros	Report
30 Nov	20:15	Mataró	12–8	Mediterrani	Report
1 Dec	10:30	Mediterrani	8–10	Dunaújváros	Report
1 Dec	12:15	Olympiacos	14–9	Mataró	Report

==== Group F ====
Venue: Centre Can Llong, Sabadell, Spain.

Pos	Team	Pld	W	D	L	GF	GA	GD	Pts	Qualification
1	(Spain) CN Sabadell	3	2	0	1	35	30	+5	6	Quarterfinals
2	(Netherlands) UZSC Utrecht	3	1	1	1	34	31	+3	4	Quarterfinals
3	(Hungary) UVSE	3	1	1	1	29	33	−4	4	
4	(Italy) SIS Roma	3	1	0	2	25	29	−4	3	

Source: LEN

Date	Time^{†}		Score		
29 Nov	19:15	Sabadell	7–11	Utrecht	Report
29 Nov	20:45	UVSE	6–5	SIS Roma	Report
30 Nov	11:15	Utrecht	13–13	UVSE	Report
30 Nov	12:45	Sabadell	13–9	SIS Roma	Report
1 Dec	11:00	SIS Roma	11–10	Utrecht	Report
1 Dec	12:30	Sabadell	15–10	UVSE	Report

==== Group G ====
Venue: Neftyanik Sports Complex, Kirishi, Russia.

Pos	Team	Pld	W	D	L	GF	GA	GD	Pts	Qualification
1	(Russia) Kinef Kirishi	3	3	0	0	50	26	+24	9	Quarterfinals
2	(Greece) NC Vouliagmeni	3	2	0	1	32	25	+7	6	Quarterfinals
3	(Italy) Plebiscito Padova	3	1	0	2	25	28	−3	3	
4	(Netherlands) ZVL-1886	3	0	0	3	18	46	−28	0	

Source: LEN

Date	Time^{†}		Score		
29 Nov	16:15	Plebiscito	6–9	Vouliagmeni	Report
29 Nov	18:00	Kinef	25–5	ZVL	Report
30 Nov	16:15	Plebiscito	8–5	ZVL	Report
30 Nov	18:00	Vouliagmeni	10–11	Kinef	Report
1 Dec	11:00	Vouliagmeni	13–8	ZVL	Report
1 Dec	12:45	Kinef	14–11	Plebiscito	Report

==== Group H ====
Venue: Piscina Francesco Scuderi, Catania, Italy.

Pos	Team	Pld	W	D	L	GF	GA	GD	Pts	Qualification
1	(Russia) Dynamo Uralochka	3	3	0	0	50	34	+16	9	Quarterfinals
2	(Italy) Orizzonte Catania	3	2	0	1	41	30	+11	6	Quarterfinals
3	(Hungary) BVSC	3	1	0	2	29	40	−11	3	
4	(Spain) CN Sant Andreu	3	0	0	3	25	41	−16	0	

Source: LEN

Date	Time^{†}		Score		
29 Nov	18:30	Orizzonte	14–7	Sant Andreu	Report
29 Nov	20:15	BVSC	11–18	Uralochka	Report
30 Nov	17:00	Orizzonte	14–16	Uralochka	Report
30 Nov	18:45	BVSC	11–9	Sant Andreu	Report
1 Dec	11:00	Uralochka	16–9	Sant Andreu	Report
1 Dec	13:00	Orizzonte	13–7	BVSC	Report

^{†} All times are local

== Knockout stage ==
=== Quarterfinals ===
The draw for the quarterfinals took place on 2 December 2019 at the Tollcross International Swimming Centre in Glasgow, Scotland, before the 2019 European Short Course Swimming Championships.

Team 1	Agg.	Team 2	1st leg	2nd leg
Dunaújváros (Hungary)	–	(Russia) Dynamo Uralochka	11–11	28 Mar
CN Sabadell (Spain)	–	(Italy) Orizzonte Catania	12–13	28 mar
Kinef Kirishi (Russia)	–	(Netherlands) UZSC Utrecht	20–6	28 Mar
NC Vouliagmeni (Greece)	–	(Greece) Olympiacos	8–10	28 Mar

==== First leg ====
8 Feb 2020; 12:30 (UTC+1)	Report	CN Sabadell (Spain)	12–13	(Italy) Orizzonte Catania	Centre Can Llong (Sabadell); Referees: Boudramis (GRE), Wengenroth (SUI)
8 Feb 2020; 12:30 (UTC+1)	Report	Score by quarters: 1–4, 5–4, 4–2, 2–3			Centre Can Llong (Sabadell); Referees: Boudramis (GRE), Wengenroth (SUI)
8 Feb 2020; 12:30 (UTC+1)	Report	5: Forca; 2: Cordobés, Eggens	Goals	5: Garibotti; 2: Viacava, Aiello, Emmolo	Centre Can Llong (Sabadell); Referees: Boudramis (GRE), Wengenroth (SUI)

8 Feb 2020; 17:00 (UTC+1)	Report	Dunaújváros (Hungary)	11–11	(Russia) Dynamo Uralochka	Fabó Éva Sportuszoda (Dunaújváros); Referees: Franulović (CRO), Rovida (ITA)
8 Feb 2020; 17:00 (UTC+1)	Report	Score by quarters: 2–2, 3–2, 3–5, 3–2			Fabó Éva Sportuszoda (Dunaújváros); Referees: Franulović (CRO), Rovida (ITA)
8 Feb 2020; 17:00 (UTC+1)	Report	5: Mahieu; 4: Garda	Goals	3: Karimova, Bersneva; 2: Panfilova	Fabó Éva Sportuszoda (Dunaújváros); Referees: Franulović (CRO), Rovida (ITA)

8 Feb 2020; 17:00 (UTC+3)	Report	Kinef Kirishi (Russia)	20–6	(Netherlands) UZSC Utrecht	Neftyanik Sports Complex (Kirishi); Referees: Schwartz (ISR)
8 Feb 2020; 17:00 (UTC+3)	Report	Score by quarters: 4–2, 5–2, 3–1, 8–1			Neftyanik Sports Complex (Kirishi); Referees: Schwartz (ISR)
8 Feb 2020; 17:00 (UTC+3)	Report	5: Krimer; 3: Prokofyeva, Glyzina, Ivanova	Goals	3: van der Weijden; 1: three players	Neftyanik Sports Complex (Kirishi); Referees: Schwartz (ISR)

8 Feb 2020; 18:00 (UTC+2)	Report	NC Vouliagmeni (Greece)	8–10	(Greece) Olympiacos	Halandri Municipal Swimming Center (Chalandri); Referees: Dreval (RUS), Bianco (ITA)
8 Feb 2020; 18:00 (UTC+2)	Report	Score by quarters: 3–2, 2–2, 1–3, 2–3			Halandri Municipal Swimming Center (Chalandri); Referees: Dreval (RUS), Bianco (ITA)
8 Feb 2020; 18:00 (UTC+2)	Report	2: Protopapas, Ninou; 1: four players	Goals	4: Christmas; 2: Plevritou	Halandri Municipal Swimming Center (Chalandri); Referees: Dreval (RUS), Bianco (ITA)

== See also ==
- 2019–20 LEN Champions League
- 2019–20 Women's LEN Trophy
