= 1999 FIFA Women's World Cup qualification (UEFA) =

Football tournament qualification stage

The 1999 UEFA Women's World Cup qualification was held between 21 August 1997 and 11 October 1998. The 16 teams belonging to Class A of European women's football were drawn into four groups, from which the group winners qualified for the 1999 FIFA Women's World Cup. The four runners-up contested two home-and-away play-offs, with the winner of each tie also qualifying for the World Cup. Sweden, Italy, Norway, Denmark, Germany and Russia qualified for the 1999 FIFA Women's World Cup.

== CLASS A ==
=== Group 1 ===
Team	Pts	Pld	W	D	L	GF	GA
Sweden	18	6	6	0	0	18	5
Ukraine	9	6	3	0	3	9	13
Iceland	5	6	1	2	3	5	9
Spain	2	6	0	2	4	5	10

30 August 1997

Iceland	1–3	Sweden
Ottarsdottir	SvFF Report (in Swedish)	Svensson; Allberg

Laugardalsvöllur, Reykjavík
Attendance: 300

7 September 1997

Iceland	3–2	Ukraine

Laugardalsvöllur, Reykjavík

28 September 1997

Sweden	3–2	Ukraine
Tornqvist; Andersson ? (o.g.)	SvFF Report (in Swedish)	Mazourenko; Verezubova

Studenternas IP, Uppsala
Attendance: 3430

1 November 1997

Spain	1–2	Ukraine
Mateos 82'	Report	Zinchenko 40', 45'

Estadi La Bòbila, Gavà
Attendance: 1,200
Referee: Nicole Novidi Bengnat(Switzerland)

3 May 1998

Spain	1–2	Sweden
?	SvFF Report (in Swedish)	Ljungberg; Svensson

Motril, Spain
Attendance: 1,000

24 May 1998

Sweden	3–1	Spain
Törnqvist; Svensson ?	SvFF Report (in Swedish)	?

Söderstadion, Stockholm
Attendance: 3,302

31 May 1998

Spain	0–0	Iceland

Palencia, Spain

7 June 1998

Ukraine	2–1	Spain

Dynamo Stadium, Kyiv

14 June 1998

Iceland	1–1	Spain

Kópavogur, Iceland

8 August 1998

Ukraine	0–5	Sweden
	SvFF Report (in Swedish)	Bengtsson; Tornqvist; Lilja; Ljungberg; Ackerfors

Dynamo Stadium, Kyiv
Attendance: 2500

26 August 1998

Sweden	2–0	Iceland
Sandell; Svensson	SvFF Report (in Swedish)

Norrvalla Stadium, Skellefteå
Attendance: 2614

30 August 1998

Ukraine	1–0	Iceland

Dynamo Stadium, Kyiv

Sweden qualified for 1999 FIFA Women's World Cup.

=== Group 2 ===
Team	Pts	Pld	W	D	L	GF	GA
Italy	16	6	5	1	0	11	4
Finland	10	6	3	1	2	6	5
France	8	6	2	2	2	9	7
Switzerland	0	6	0	0	6	2	12

6 September 1997

Finland	1–0	Switzerland

Jakobstad, Finland

4 October 1997

Switzerland	1–2	France

Bern, Switzerland

18 October 1997

France	2–2	Finland

Le Creusot, France

1 November 1997

Switzerland	1–3	Italy

Nyon, Switzerland

22 November 1997

Italy	0–0	France

Como, Italy

11 April 1998

France	2–3	Italy

Blois, France

2 May 1998

France	3–0	Switzerland

Bruay-la-Buissière, France

5 May 1998

Italy	1–0	Finland

Cagliari, Italy

16 May 1998

Italy	2–0	Switzerland

Perugia, Italy

23 May 1998

Finland	1–0	France

Helsinki, Finland

6 June 1998

Switzerland	0–1	Finland

Sursee, Switzerland

27 June 1998

Finland	1–2	Italy

Espoo, Finland

Italy qualified for 1999 FIFA Women's World Cup.

=== Group 3 ===
Team	Pts	Pld	W	D	L	GF	GA
Norway	13	6	4	1	1	13	5
Germany	12	6	4	0	2	9	5
Netherlands	7	6	2	1	3	5	10
England	3	6	1	0	5	3	10

25 September 1997

Germany	3–0	England

Dessau, Germany

1 October 1997

Norway	6–1	Netherlands
Pettersen 4', 9', 76'; Riise 33'; Medalen 79'; Lehn 86'	Report (in Dutch)	Roos 60'

Bislett Stadion, Oslo
Attendance: 339
Referee: Zygmunt Ziober (Poland)

30 October 1997

England	1–0	Netherlands
Smith 60'	Report (in Dutch)

Upton Park, London
Attendance: 2,002
Referee: Asim Khudiev (Azerbaijan)

6 November 1997

Germany	1–0	Norway

Bayreuth, Germany

13 December 1997

Netherlands	1–0	Germany
Noom 64'	Report (in Dutch)

Polman Stadion, Almelo
Attendance: 4,200
Referee: Gitte Lyngo Nielsen (Denmark)

8 March 1998

England	0–1	Germany

London, England
Attendance: 4,917 (National Record)

2 April 1998

Germany	2–1	Netherlands
Voss 80'; Koning 82' (o.g.)	Report (in Dutch)	Migchelsen 45'

Friedrich-Ludwig-Jahn-Stadion, Herford
Attendance: 5,970
Referee: Kazimir Znaydinski (Belarus)

18 April 1998

Netherlands	0–0	Norway
	Report (in Dutch)

De Baandert, Sittard
Attendance: 1,200
Referee: Lassin Isaksen (Faroe Islands)

14 May 1998

England	1–2	Norway

Manchester, England

23 May 1998

Netherlands	2–1	England
Noom 1', 46'	Report (in Dutch)	??? 2'

Sportpark Olympia, Waalwijk
Referee: Mammedov Khagani (Azerbaijan)

17 June 1998

Norway	3–2	Germany

Ulefoss, Norway

15 August 1998

Norway	2–0	England

Lillestrøm, Norway

Norway qualified for 1999 FIFA Women's World Cup.

=== Group 4 ===
Team	Pts	Pld	W	D	L	GF	GA
Denmark	18	6	6	0	0	22	3
Russia	12	6	4	0	2	15	9
Portugal	6	6	2	0	4	4	15
Belgium	0	6	0	0	6	5	19

21 August 1997

Denmark	3–1	Russia

Hjørring Stadium, Hjørring

27 September 1997

Belgium	1–2	Denmark

King Baudouin Stadium, Brussels

11 October 1997

Belgium	3–4	Russia

Leuven, Belgium

29 October 1997

Denmark	4–0	Portugal
Krogh 28', 87'; Flæng 48'; Anne Nielsen 78'	Report

Hjørring Stadium, Hjørring
Referee: Gerard Perry (Republic of Ireland)

8 November 1997

Portugal	0–2	Russia
	Report	Barbashina 12'; Kamarova 90'

Complexo Desportivo Fernando Mamede, Beja
Referee: Vibeke Karlsen (Norway)

28 February 1998

Portugal	2–0	Belgium
Carla Couto 8'; Paula Reis 68'	Report

Estádio Municipal de Cantanhede, Cantanhede
Referee: Tiziana Calamosca (Italy)

4 April 1998

Belgium	0–2	Portugal
	Report	Ana Rita 7'; Anabela 61'

King Baudouin Stadium, Brussels
Referee: Karen Nalbandyan (Armenia)

25 April 1998

Russia	2–0	Portugal
Barbashina 10'; Kamarova 24'	Report

Estádio Luch, Tula
Referee: Benedik Bolidan

16 May 1998

Portugal	0–7	Denmark
	Report	Christina B. Petersen 1'; Merete Pedersen 4', 62'; Monica 24' (o.g.); Anne Nielsen 38'; Krogh 69'; Rasmussen 76'

Estádio-João-Paulo-II, Angra do Heroísmo (Azores)
Referee: Michael Ross (Northern Ireland)

23 May 1998

Russia	5–1	Belgium

Selyatino, Russia

22 August 1998

Russia	1–2	Denmark

Selyatino, Russia

29 August 1998

Denmark	4–0	Belgium

Odense, Denmark

Denmark qualified for 1999 FIFA Women's World Cup.

== CLASS B ==
=== Group 5 ===
Team	Pts	Pld	W	D	L	GF	GA
Scotland	14	6	4	2	0	38	3
Czech Republic	14	6	4	2	0	37	2
Estonia	3	6	1	0	5	6	31
Lithuania	3	6	1	0	5	3	48

16 August 1997

Lithuania	3–2	Estonia

Vilnius, Lithuania

20 August 1997

Czech Republic	6–0	Estonia

Lanžhot, Czech Republic

3 September 1997

Estonia	1–7	Scotland

Tallinn, Estonia

7 September 1997

Lithuania	0–5	Scotland

Vilnius, Lithuania

7 October 1997

Estonia	0–8	Czech Republic

Tallinn, Estonia

10 October 1997

Lithuania	0–12	Czech Republic

Vilnius, Lithuania

26 April 1998

Czech Republic	1–1	Scotland

Český Dub, Czech Republic

3 May 1998

Scotland	7–0	Estonia

Ayr, Scotland

16 May 1998

Czech Republic	9–0	Lithuania

Sedlčany, Czech Republic

23 May 1998

Scotland	1–1	Czech Republic

Caledonian Stadium, Inverness

30 May 1998

Scotland	17–0	Lithuania

Scotstoun Stadium, Glasgow

27 June 1998

Estonia	3–0	Lithuania

Tallinn, Estonia

=== Group 6 ===
Team	Pts	Pld	W	D	L	GF	GA
Poland	16	6	5	1	0	15	4
Republic of Ireland	10	6	3	1	2	8	4
Belarus	5	6	1	2	3	8	9
Wales	2	6	0	2	4	7	21

10 September 1997

Belarus	0–1	Poland

Mogilev, Belarus

21 September 1997

Belarus	0–1	Republic of Ireland
	Report	Power 55'

Mogilev, Belarus
Referee: Galina Doneva (Bulgaria)

8 October 1997

Poland	2–2	Wales

Zamość, Poland

12 October 1997

Belarus	4–1	Wales

Mogilev, Belarus

2 November 1997

Republic of Ireland	0–1	Poland
	Report	Szondermajer 44'

Tolka Park, Dublin
Referee: Niklas á Liðarenda (Faroe Islands)

7 December 1997

Wales	0–3	Republic of Ireland
	Report	O'Shea 2'; McNally 28', 90'

Bangor, Wales
Referee: Katriina Elovirta (Finland)

8 March 1998

Republic of Ireland	4–0	Wales
Reilly 29'; Kierans 57'; Saurin 68', 90'	Report

Bray, Republic of Ireland
Referee: Maria Patrascu (Romania)

1 May 1998

Wales	1–5	Poland

Barry, Wales

24 May 1998

Wales	3–3	Belarus

Haverfordwest, Wales

6 June 1998

Poland	3–0	Republic of Ireland
Nieczypor 10', 57'; Szondermajer 30'	Report

Łuków, Poland
Referee: Algirdas Dubinskas (Lithuania)

17 June 1998

Poland	3–1	Belarus

Piekary Śląskie, Poland

27 June 1998

Republic of Ireland	0–0	Belarus
	Report

Drogheda, Republic of Ireland
Referee: Andrei Iacovlev

=== Group 7 ===
Team	Pts	Pld	W	D	L	GF	GA
FR Yugoslavia	18	6	6	0	0	24	4
Bulgaria	7	6	2	1	3	11	12
Turkey	5	6	1	2	3	6	15
Greece	4	6	1	1	4	8	18
Georgia	0	0	0	0	0	0	0

- Georgia withdrew after two matches.
10 September 1997

FR Yugoslavia	11–0 Annulled	Georgia

Kula, Yugoslavia

25 September 1997

Georgia	0–1 Annulled	Turkey

Rustavi, Georgia

28 September 1997

Greece	1–5	Bulgaria

Nea Kallikratia, Greece

30 October 1997

Turkey	0–5	FR Yugoslavia

Sakarya, Turkey

2 November 1997

Greece	2–3	FR Yugoslavia

Athens, Greece

23 November 1997

Bulgaria	1–2	Turkey

Sofia, Bulgaria

5 December 1997

FR Yugoslavia	2–0	Bulgaria

Kruševac, Yugoslavia

17 December 1997

Turkey	1–1	Greece

Istanbul, Turkey

8 March 1998

Greece	3–2	Turkey

Thessaloniki, Greece

12 April 1998

Bulgaria	3–0	Greece

Sandanski, Bulgaria

20 May 1998

FR Yugoslavia	4–0	Turkey

Kula, Yugoslavia

6 June 1998

Bulgaria	1–6	FR Yugoslavia

Sofia, Bulgaria

20 June 1998

FR Yugoslavia	4–1	Greece

Kruševac, Yugoslavia

20 June 1998

Turkey	1–1	Bulgaria

Tekirdağ, Turkey

=== Group 8 ===
Team	Pts	Pld	W	D	L	GF	GA
Romania	18	8	5	3	0	30	6
Slovakia	17	8	5	2	1	33	5
Hungary	16	8	5	1	2	32	9
Israel	3	8	1	0	7	6	31
Bosnia and Herzegovina	3	8	1	0	7	5	55

2 September 1997

Slovakia	11–0	Bosnia and Herzegovina
Lisková 3'; Beregszasziova 5'; Botková 13', 33', 74'; Geržová 35'; Lukácsová 40', 57', 62'; Gážiová 70'; Štefúnová 89'	/ SFZ Report (in Slovak)	Kerla (yellow card) 12'; Zukanovic (yellow card) 35'; Kero (yellow card) 64'; Hurem (yellow card) 68'; Skandro (yellow card) 73'; Salcinovic (yellow card) 83'

Šaľa, Slovakia

13 September 1997

Romania	1–1	Slovakia
Laslo (yellow card) 37'; Grigore 38'	/ SFZ Report (in Slovak)	Gajdošová 9'

Câmpina, Romania

17 September 1997

Hungary	10–0	Bosnia and Herzegovina
Ruff 4', 38', 63', 90'; Dombai-Nagy 40'; Bökk 49'; Mester 55'; Paraoánu 65', 90'; Főfai 76'	Report

Komló, Hungary

11 October 1997

Romania	4–0	Bosnia and Herzegovina
Enache 42', 59', 71'; Pufulete 73'	Report	Serdarevic (yellow card) 79'

Câmpina, Romania

22 October 1997

Slovakia	4–0	Hungary
Babuliaková 10', 66'; Botková 21'; Geržová 49'; Lukácsová (yellow card) 76'	SFZ Report (in Slovak)	Nagy (yellow card) 45'; Sebestyén (yellow card) 64'

Trenčín, Slovakia

2 November 1997

Israel	0–7	Romania
	Report	Enache 7', 33'; Grigore 8'; Surdu 11', 69'; Ciorba 15', 22'

Bat Yam, Israel

12 December 1997

Romania	3–1	Hungary
Ciorba 13', 37'; Surdu 32'; Berinczan (yellow card) 55'; Pintea (yellow card) 85'	Report	Milasin (yellow card) 48'

Câmpina, Romania

1 April 1998

Israel	0–4	Slovakia
	IFA report (in Hebrew); SFZ Report (in Slovak)	Juríková 3', 24'; Beregszasziova 49', 55'

Bat Yam, Israel

8 April 1998

Israel	5–0	Bosnia and Herzegovina
Jan 41' (pen.), 55', 85', 86'; Hajaj 51'	IFA Report (in Hebrew)

Bat Yam, Israel

26 April 1998

Slovakia	1–1	Romania
Knoppová (yellow card) 18'; Botková 43'; Juríková (yellow card) 78'	/ SFZ Report (in Slovak)	Ciorba 19' (yellow card) 90'; Abrasu (yellow card) 32'; Mache (yellow card) 75'

Žiar nad Hronom, Slovakia

1 May 1998

Bosnia and Herzegovina	0–7	Slovakia
Serdarevic (yellow card) 24'	/ SFZ Report (in Slovak)	Beregszasziova 2'; Babuliaková 5', 8'; Gajdošová 24'; Škodlerová 64'; Botková 82'; Lukácsová 88'

Hrasnica, Bosnia and Herzegovina

3 May 1998

Bosnia and Herzegovina	0–9	Hungary
Pehić (yellow card) 41'; Pavlovic (yellow card) 45'; Bilic (red card) 79'	Report	Ruff 3', 73', 81' (yellow card) 56'; Sebestyén 18'; Dombai-Nagy 26', 84'; Masic 45' (o.g.); Bajkó 69', 87'

Hrasnica, Bosnia and Herzegovina

13 May 1998

Slovakia	5–0	Israel
Čillíková 2'; Babuliaková 11'; Škodlerová 47', 54'; Gajdošová 59'	/ SFZ Report (in Slovak)	Gonen (yellow card) 32'; Belhassen (yellow card) 58'

Prešov, Slovakia

17 May 1998

Hungary	5–0	Israel
Bajkó 20', 65', 83'; Ruff 42', 49'; Paraoánu (yellow card) 53'; Szabo (yellow card) 85'	Report	Dayan (yellow card) 61'; Birn (yellow card) 61'; Navah (yellow card) 74'

Kecskemét, Hungary

17 May 1998

Bosnia and Herzegovina	1–8	Romania
Kerla 62' (yellow card) 30'; Masic (yellow card) 41'; Serdarevic (yellow card) 69'	Report	Enache 6', 25', 66', 70' (yellow card) 35'; Surdu 8'; Grigore 13', 21'; Pufulete 29'; Pintea (yellow card) 32'; Ghevrec-Vasilescu (yellow card) 57'

Sarajevo, Bosnia and Herzegovina

3 June 1998

Hungary	3–0	Slovakia
Mester (yellow card) 19'; Bajkó 30'; Fülöp 63', 68'	/ SFZ Report (in Slovak)	Škodlerová (yellow card) 8'; Kúdelová (yellow card) 22'; Benediková (red card) 67'

Bük, Hungary

27 June 1998

Hungary	2–2	Romania
Bökk 40'; Paraoánu (yellow card) 62'; Marko 68'; Ruff (yellow card) 78'	Report	Leu (yellow card) 5'; Pufulete 9'; Ducan 11'

Siófok, Hungary

15 August 1998

Israel	0–2	Hungary
	Report	Bökk 21'; Mester 82'

Bat Yam, Israel

18 August 1998

Bosnia and Herzegovina	4–1	Israel
Pehić 31', 56', 85', 90'; Zec (yellow card) 65'	Report	Hagag 88'

Vogošća, Bosnia and Herzegovina

26 August 1998

Romania	4–0	Israel
Enache 39', 84'; Pufulete 47'; Mache (yellow card) 49'; Grigore 74'	Report	Awisat (yellow card) 9'; Antman (yellow card) 81'

Câmpina, Romania

== Playoff A ==
12 September 1998

Russia	2–1	Finland

Moscow, Russia
11 October 1998

Finland	1–2	Russia

Helsinki, Finland

Russia qualified for 1999 FIFA Women's World Cup.

17 September 1998

Germany	5–0	Ukraine

Fulda, Germany
11 October 1998

Ukraine	1–1	Germany

Kyiv, Ukraine

Germany qualified for 1999 FIFA Women's World Cup.

== Playoff B ==
12 September 1998

Poland	0–1	Switzerland

Ostrowiec, Poland
10 October 1998

Switzerland	4–0	Poland

Renens, Switzerland

13 September 1998

FR Yugoslavia	3–0	Belgium

Belgrade, Yugoslavia
10 October 1998

Belgium	1–1	FR Yugoslavia

Leuven, Belgium

13 September 1998

Romania	1–4	England

Câmpina, Romania
11 October 1998

England	2–1	Romania

High Wycombe, England

13 September 1998

Scotland	0–3	Spain
		Jiménez 29'; Mateos 66'; Monforte 75'

Stirling, Scotland
11 October 1998

Spain	4–1	Scotland
Gimbert (?); Monforte (?); Cabezón (?); Marco (?)		Fleeting (?)

Córdoba, Spain
