= Water polo at the 2015 European Games – Women's tournament =

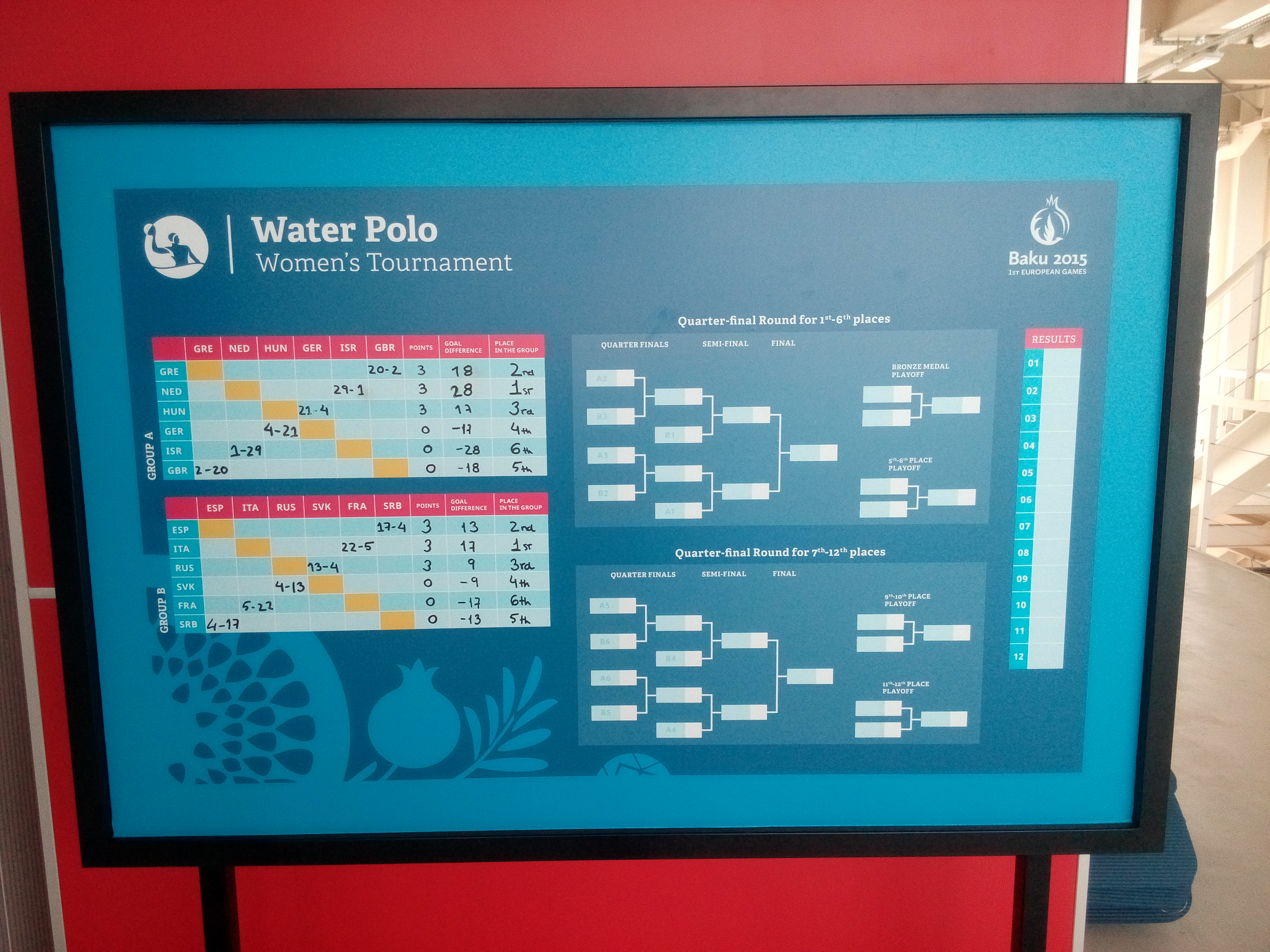
- Women's tournament

Tournament details
- Venue: 1 (in 1 host city)
- Dates: 12–20 June
- Teams: 12 (from 1 confederation)

Final positions
- Champions: Russia (1st title)
- Runners-up: Spain
- Third place: Greece
- Fourth place: Italy

Tournament statistics
- Matches played: 44
- Top scorers: (Italy) Agnese Cocchiere (24 goals)

The women's water polo tournament at the 2015 European Games was held in Baku, Azerbaijan from 12 to 20 June 2015.

== Qualification ==
Means of qualification	Date	Venue	Number of berths	Nation(s) qualified
2013 European Junior Water Polo Championships	1–8 September 2013	(Turkey) Istanbul	6	Greece; Spain; Netherlands; Italy; Hungary; Russia
2015 European Games Qualification Tournament A	12–15 March 2015	(France) Nice	2	France; Great Britain
2015 European Games Qualification Tournament B	12–14 March 2015	(Slovakia) Bratislava	2	Slovakia; Israel
2015 European Games Qualification Tournament C	12–14 March 2015	(Serbia) Belgrade	2	Germany; Serbia
Total			12	

== Preliminary round ==
All times are local (UTC+5).

=== Group A ===
Pos	Team	Pld	W	D	L	GF	GA	GD	Pts	Qualification
1	Greece	5	4	0	1	78	29	+49	12 (Note: Greece 3 Pts, +5 GD; Netherlands 3 Pts, –1 GD; Hungary 3 Pts, –4 GD)	Semifinals
2	Netherlands	5	4	0	1	86	34	+52	12	Quarterfinals
3	Hungary	5	4	0	1	80	35	+45	12	Quarterfinals
4	Germany	5	2	0	3	32	61	−29	6	7–10th place semifinals
5	Great Britain	5	1	0	4	33	74	−41	3	7–12th place quarterfinals
6	Israel	5	0	0	5	18	94	−76	0	7–12th place quarterfinals

Source: Baku 2015
Notes:

12 June 2015; 12:00	Report	Netherlands	29–1	Israel	Water Polo Arena, Baku

12 June 2015; 12:00	Report	Hungary	21–4	Germany	Water Polo Arena, Baku

12 June 2015; 13:45	Report	Greece	20–2	Great Britain	Water Polo Arena, Baku

13 June 2015; 15:00	Report	Israel	3–23	Hungary	Water Polo Arena, Baku

13 June 2015; 16:45	Report	Great Britain	8–10	Germany	Water Polo Arena, Baku

13 June 2015; 20:30	Report	Greece	14–8	Netherlands	Water Polo Arena, Baku

14 June 2015; 11:15	Report	Germany	10–1	Israel	Water Polo Arena, Baku

14 June 2015; 16:45	Report	Netherlands	19–6	Great Britain	Water Polo Arena, Baku

14 June 2015; 20:30	Report	Hungary	11–10	Greece	Water Polo Arena, Baku

15 June 2015; 15:00	Report	Great Britain	13–9	Israel	Water Polo Arena, Baku

15 June 2015; 16:45	Report	Greece	15–4	Germany	Water Polo Arena, Baku

15 June 2015; 20:30	Report	Netherlands	14–9	Hungary	Water Polo Arena, Baku

16 June 2015; 10:30	Report	Greece	19–4	Israel	Water Polo Arena, Baku

16 June 2015; 12:15	Report	Germany	4–16	Netherlands	Water Polo Arena, Baku

16 June 2015; 18:00	Report	Hungary	16–4	Great Britain	Water Polo Arena, Baku

=== Group B ===
Pos	Team	Pld	W	D	L	GF	GA	GD	Pts	Qualification
1	Russia	5	4	1	0	89	29	+60	13	Semifinals
2	Spain	5	4	0	1	75	33	+42	12	Quarterfinals
3	Italy	5	3	1	1	76	37	+39	10	Quarterfinals
4	Slovakia	5	2	0	3	33	64	−31	6	7–10th place semifinals
5	France	5	1	0	4	27	83	−56	3	7–12th place quarterfinals
6	Serbia	5	0	0	5	26	80	−54	0	7–12th place quarterfinals

Source: Baku 2015

12 June 2015; 13:45	Report	Spain	17–4	Serbia	Water Polo Arena, Baku

12 June 2015; 15:30	Report	Russia	13–4	Slovakia	Water Polo Arena, Baku; Referees: Brian Littlejohn (GBR); Gabriella Várkonyi (HUN)
12 June 2015; 15:30	Report	Score by quarters: 2–1, 3–1, 4–2, 4–0			Water Polo Arena, Baku; Referees: Brian Littlejohn (GBR); Gabriella Várkonyi (HUN)
12 June 2015; 15:30	Report	Bersneva, Khamzaeva 3	Goals	Stankovianska 2	Water Polo Arena, Baku; Referees: Brian Littlejohn (GBR); Gabriella Várkonyi (HUN)

12 June 2015; 15:30	Report	Italy	22–5	France	Water Polo Arena, Baku

13 June 2015; 11:15	Report	France	3–25	Russia	Water Polo Arena, Baku; Referees: Massimo Angileri (MLT); Cornelis van der Loo (NED)
13 June 2015; 11:15	Report	Score by quarters: 0–4, 1–8, 1–8, 1–5			Water Polo Arena, Baku; Referees: Massimo Angileri (MLT); Cornelis van der Loo (NED)
13 June 2015; 11:15	Report	Le Roux 2	Goals	Bersneva, Fedotova 6	Water Polo Arena, Baku; Referees: Massimo Angileri (MLT); Cornelis van der Loo (NED)

13 June 2015; 13:00	Report	Serbia	8–9	Slovakia	Water Polo Arena, Baku

13 June 2015; 18:45	Report	Spain	10–8	Italy	Water Polo Arena, Baku

14 June 2015; 13:00	Report	Italy	17–4	Serbia	Water Polo Arena, Baku

14 June 2015; 15:00	Report	Slovakia	9–5	France	Water Polo Arena, Baku

14 June 2015; 18:45	Report	Russia	12–8	Spain	Water Polo Arena, Baku; Referees: Konstantinos Kyranis (GRE); Gábor Vogel (HUN)
14 June 2015; 18:45	Report	Score by quarters: 3–1, 3–2, 2–3 , 4–2			Water Polo Arena, Baku; Referees: Konstantinos Kyranis (GRE); Gábor Vogel (HUN)
14 June 2015; 18:45	Report	three players 3	Goals	Aznar, Roldán 2	Water Polo Arena, Baku; Referees: Konstantinos Kyranis (GRE); Gábor Vogel (HUN)

15 June 2015; 11:15	Report	Serbia	7–9	France	Water Polo Arena, Baku

15 June 2015; 13:00	Report	Spain	20–4	Slovakia	Water Polo Arena, Baku

15 June 2015; 18:45	Report	Italy	11–11	Russia	Water Polo Arena, Baku; Referees: Vlaho Radičević (CRO); Matan Schwartz (ISR)
15 June 2015; 18:45	Report	Score by quarters: 3–3, 2–4, 3–2, 3–2			Water Polo Arena, Baku; Referees: Vlaho Radičević (CRO); Matan Schwartz (ISR)
15 June 2015; 18:45	Report	Picozzi 6	Goals	Gerzanich 3	Water Polo Arena, Baku; Referees: Vlaho Radičević (CRO); Matan Schwartz (ISR)

16 June 2015; 14:15	Report	Slovakia	7–18	Italy	Water Polo Arena, Baku

16 June 2015; 16:00	Report	Russia	28–3	Serbia	Water Polo Arena, Baku; Referees: Erkan Türkkan (TUR); Massimo Angileri (MLT)
16 June 2015; 16:00	Report	Score by quarters: 9–1, 7–1, 9–0, 3–1			Water Polo Arena, Baku; Referees: Erkan Türkkan (TUR); Massimo Angileri (MLT)
16 June 2015; 16:00	Report	Khamzaeva 6	Goals	Damnjanović 2	Water Polo Arena, Baku; Referees: Erkan Türkkan (TUR); Massimo Angileri (MLT)

16 June 2015; 19:45	Report	Spain	20–5	France	Water Polo Arena, Baku

== Classification round ==
=== Bracket ===
7–12th place quarterfinals
A5	Great Britain	3
B6	Serbia	11
A6	Israel	9
B5	France (PSO)	11

7–10th place semifinals
B4	Slovakia	10
B6	Serbia	6
A4	Germany	10
B5	France	8
11th place
A5	Great Britain	10
A6	Israel	5

7th place
B4	Slovakia	11
A4	Germany	13
9th place
B6	Serbia	7
B5	France	3

=== 7–12th place quarterfinals ===
17 June 2015; 10:30	Report	Great Britain	3–11	Serbia	Water Polo Arena, Baku

17 June 2015; 12:15	Report	Israel	9–11 (PSO)	France	Water Polo Arena, Baku
17 June 2015; 12:15	Report	Score by quarters: 0–0, 4–2, 0–3, 3–2 PSO: 2–4			Water Polo Arena, Baku

=== Eleventh place game ===
18 June 2015; 13:00	Report	Great Britain	10–5	Israel	Water Polo Arena, Baku

=== 7–10th place semifinals ===
18 June 2015; 14:30	Report	Serbia	6–10	Slovakia	Water Polo Arena, Baku

18 June 2015; 17:00	Report	France	8–10	Germany	Water Polo Arena, Baku

=== Ninth place game ===
20 June 2015; 12:00	Report	Serbia	7–3	France	Water Polo Arena, Baku

=== Seventh place game ===
20 June 2015; 13:30	Report	Slovakia	11–13	Germany	Water Polo Arena, Baku

== Final round ==
=== Bracket ===
Quarterfinals
A2	Netherlands	12
B3	Italy	18
A3	Hungary	5
B2	Spain	8

Semifinals
B1	Russia	17
B3	Italy	7
A1	Greece	6
B2	Spain	9
5th place
A2	Netherlands	9
A3	Hungary	10

Gold medal game
B1	Russia (PSO)	17
B2	Spain	16
Bronze medal game
B3	Italy	7
A1	Greece	8

=== Quarterfinals ===
17 June 2015; 10:30	Report	Netherlands	12–18	Italy	Water Polo Arena, Baku; Referees: Vlaho Radičević (CRO); Ivan Raković (SRB)
17 June 2015; 10:30	Report	Score by quarters: 3–6, 3–4, 2–5, 4–3			Water Polo Arena, Baku; Referees: Vlaho Radičević (CRO); Ivan Raković (SRB)
17 June 2015; 10:30	Report	Rogge 3	Goals	Cocchiere 6	Water Polo Arena, Baku; Referees: Vlaho Radičević (CRO); Ivan Raković (SRB)

17 June 2015; 12:15	Report	Hungary	5–8	Spain	Water Polo Arena, Baku; Referees: Matan Schwartz (ISR); Boris Obradović (MNE)
17 June 2015; 12:15	Report	Score by quarters: 1–2, 1–2, 1–1, 2–3			Water Polo Arena, Baku; Referees: Matan Schwartz (ISR); Boris Obradović (MNE)
17 June 2015; 12:15	Report	Farkas 3	Goals	Aznar 3	Water Polo Arena, Baku; Referees: Matan Schwartz (ISR); Boris Obradović (MNE)

=== Semifinals ===
18 June 2015; 18:30	Report	Italy	7–17	Russia	Water Polo Arena, Baku; Referees: Marcela Mauss (GER); Radu Matache (ROU)
18 June 2015; 18:30	Report	Score by quarters: 0–4, 1–8, 1–8, 1–5			Water Polo Arena, Baku; Referees: Marcela Mauss (GER); Radu Matache (ROU)
18 June 2015; 18:30	Report	Altamura, Millo 2	Goals	Bersneva 4	Water Polo Arena, Baku; Referees: Marcela Mauss (GER); Radu Matache (ROU)

18 June 2015; 20:00	Report	Spain	9–6	Greece	Water Polo Arena, Baku; Referees: Ivan Raković (SRB); Mark Koganov (AZE)
18 June 2015; 20:00	Report	Score by quarters: 2–2, 3–2, 2–1, 2–1			Water Polo Arena, Baku; Referees: Ivan Raković (SRB); Mark Koganov (AZE)
18 June 2015; 20:00	Report	Aznar 4	Goals	Mavrota, Protopapas 2	Water Polo Arena, Baku; Referees: Ivan Raković (SRB); Mark Koganov (AZE)

=== Fifth place game ===
20 June 2015; 15:00	Report	Netherlands	9–10	Hungary	Water Polo Arena, Baku; Referees: Ivan Raković (SRB); Radu Matache (ROU)
20 June 2015; 15:00	Report	Score by quarters: 4–2, 2–1, 0–2, 3–5			Water Polo Arena, Baku; Referees: Ivan Raković (SRB); Radu Matache (ROU)
20 June 2015; 15:00	Report	Mulder 3	Goals	three players 2	Water Polo Arena, Baku; Referees: Ivan Raković (SRB); Radu Matache (ROU)

=== Bronze medal game ===
20 June 2015; 18:00	Report	Italy	7–8	Greece (bronze)	Water Polo Arena, Baku; Referees: Svetlana Dreval (RUS); Juan Colominas (ESP)
20 June 2015; 18:00	Report	Score by quarters: 3–1, 1–4, 1–3, 2–0			Water Polo Arena, Baku; Referees: Svetlana Dreval (RUS); Juan Colominas (ESP)
20 June 2015; 18:00	Report	Cocchiere 5	Goals	Protopapas 3	Water Polo Arena, Baku; Referees: Svetlana Dreval (RUS); Juan Colominas (ESP)

=== Final ===
20 June 2015; 19:30	Report	(gold) Russia	17–16 (PSO)	Spain (silver)	Water Polo Arena, Baku; Referees: Gabriella Várkonyi (HUN); Vlaho Radičević (CRO)
20 June 2015; 19:30	Report	Score by quarters: 3–3, 1–2, 2–3, 4–2 PSO: 7–6			Water Polo Arena, Baku; Referees: Gabriella Várkonyi (HUN); Vlaho Radičević (CRO)
20 June 2015; 19:30	Report	Gerzanich 3	Goals	Aznar 3	Water Polo Arena, Baku; Referees: Gabriella Várkonyi (HUN); Vlaho Radičević (CRO)

== Final standings ==
Rank	Team
1st place, gold medalist(s)	Russia
2nd place, silver medalist(s)	Spain
3rd place, bronze medalist(s)	Greece
4	Italy
5	Hungary
6	Netherlands
7	Germany
8	Slovakia
9	Serbia
10	France
11	Great Britain
12	Israel

== See also ==
- Water polo at the 2015 European Games – Men's tournament
