= 2018–19 LEN Euro League Women =

European water polo tournament

- League: LEN Euro League Women
- Sport: Water Polo
- Duration: 24 January – 20 April 2019
- Number of games: 48
- Number of teams: 19 (from 9 countries)
- Season champions: (Spain) CN Sabadell (5th title)
- Runners-up: (Greece) Olympiacos

Euro League Women seasons
- ← 2017–18 2019−20 →

The 2018–19 LEN Euro League Women was the 32nd edition of the major European tournament for women's water polo clubs. It ran from 24 January to 20 April 2019.

The Final 4 was contested in Sabadell, Spain, on 19 and 20 April. The home team became European champion for the fifth time, defeating Greece's Olympiacos in the final match.

== Overview ==
=== Calendar ===
The calendar of the competition was announced on 25 May 2018.

Phase	Round	First leg	Second leg
Preliminary round	~~Qualification Round I~~ ‡	~~23–25 November 2018~~	
Preliminary round	Qualification Round II	24–27 January 2019	
Knockout stage	Quarterfinals	23 February 2019	9/12 March 2019
Knockout stage	Final 4	19–20 April 2019	

‡: Not contested

=== Participating teams ===
Preliminary round
(Croatia) ŽAVK Mladost	(Greece) Olympiacos	(Italy) Orizzonte Catania	(Russia) Dynamo Uralochka	(Spain) CN Mataró
(France) Lille UC	(Hungary) BVSC	(Italy) Plebiscito Padova	(Russia) Kinef Kirishi	(Spain) CN Sabadell
(Greece) Ethnikos	(Hungary) Dunaújváros	(Italy) Rapallo	(Russia) Ugra Khanty-Mansiysk	(Spain) CN Sant Andreu
(Greece) NC Vouliagmeni	(Hungary) UVSE	(Netherlands) ZVL-1886	(Slovakia) Olympia Košice	

== Preliminary round ==
The draw of the pools for the preliminary round was held in Kirishi, Russia, before the 2018 Super Cup, on 9 october 2018.

=== Pools composition ===
Group A	Group B	Group C	Group D
(Hungary) BVSC	(Spain) CN Sabadell	(Spain) CN Mataró	(Russia) Dynamo Uralochka
(Spain) CN Sant Andreu (H)	(Hungary) Dunaújváros	(Greece) Olympiacos	(Greece) Ethnikos (H)
(Russia) Kinef Kirishi	(Greece) NC Vouliagmeni	(Italy) Plebiscito Padova (H)	(France) Lille UC
(Croatia) ŽAVK Mladost	(Slovakia) Olympia Košice (H)	(Russia) Ugra Khanty-Mansiysk	(Italy) Orizzonte Catania
(Netherlands) ZVL-1886	(Italy) Rapallo		(Hungary) UVSE

=== Group A ===
Venue: Piscina Pere Serrat, Barcelona, Spain.

Pos	Team	Pld	W	D	L	GF	GA	GD	Pts	Qualification
1	(Russia) Kinef Kirishi	4	4	0	0	76	24	+52	12	Quarterfinals
2	(Spain) CN Sant Andreu	4	3	0	1	46	32	+14	9	Quarterfinals
3	(Hungary) BVSC	4	1	1	2	51	33	+18	4	
4	(Netherlands) ZVL-1886	4	1	1	2	33	44	−11	4	
5	(Croatia) ŽAVK Mladost	4	0	0	4	21	94	−73	0	

Source: LEN

Date	Time^{†}		Score		
24 Jan	18:30	Sant Andreu	8–7	BVSC	Report
24 Jan	20:30	Kinef	30–6	Mladost	Report
25 Jan	10:00	Kinef	20–5	ZVL	Report
25 Jan	12:00	Mladost	5–28	BVSC	Report
25 Jan	18:30	Sant Andreu	12–3	ZVL	Report
25 Jan	20:30	BVSC	7–11	Kinef	Report
26 Jan	18:30	Sant Andreu	6–15	Kinef	Report
26 Jan	20:30	ZVL	16–3	Mladost	Report
27 Jan	10:30	BVSC	9–9	ZVL	Report
27 Jan	12:30	Sant Andreu	20–7	Mladost	Report

=== Group B ===
Venue: Mestská Krytá Plaváreň, Košice, Slovakia.

Pos	Team	Pld	W	D	L	GF	GA	GD	Pts	Qualification
1	(Spain) CN Sabadell	4	4	0	0	66	27	+39	12	Quarterfinals
2	(Greece) NC Vouliagmeni	4	3	0	1	50	29	+21	9	Quarterfinals
3	(Hungary) Dunaújváros	4	2	0	2	49	36	+13	6	
4	(Italy) Rapallo	4	1	0	3	43	45	−2	3	
5	(Slovakia) Olympia Košice	4	0	0	4	13	74	−61	0	

Source: LEN

Date	Time^{†}		Score		
24 Jan	18:00	Dunaújváros	9–8	Rapallo	Report
24 Jan	19:30	Sabadell	24–4	Košice	Report
25 Jan	10:00	Rapallo	9–17	Sabadell	Report
25 Jan	11:30	Dunaújváros	11–13	Vouliagmeni	Report
25 Jan	18:00	Sabadell	13–7	Dunaújváros	Report
25 Jan	19:30	Vouliagmeni	17–1	Košice	Report
26 Jan	18:00	Vouliagmeni	7–12	Sabadell	Report
26 Jan	19:30	Košice	6–21	Rapallo	Report
27 Jan	10:00	Rapallo	5–13	Vouliagmeni	Report
27 Jan	11:30	Košice	2–22	Dunaújváros	Report

=== Group C ===
Venue: Centro Sportivo del Plebiscito, Padua, Italy.

Pos	Team	Pld	W	D	L	GF	GA	GD	Pts	Qualification
1	(Greece) Olympiacos	3	2	1	0	41	20	+21	7	Quarterfinals
2	(Italy) Plebiscito Padova	3	2	1	0	35	21	+14	7	Quarterfinals
3	(Spain) CN Mataró	3	1	0	2	22	27	−5	3	
4	(Russia) Ugra Khanty-Mansiysk	3	0	0	3	15	45	−30	0	

Source: LEN

Date	Time^{†}		Score		
25 Jan	18:00	Plebiscito	15–5	Ugra KM	Report
25 Jan	20:00	Mataró	5–12	Olympiacos	Report
26 Jan	17:00	Olympiacos	20–6	Ugra KM	Report
26 Jan	19:00	Plebiscito	11–7	Mataró	Report
27 Jan	10:00	Ugra KM	4–10	Mataró	Report
27 Jan	12:00	Olympiacos	9–9	Plebiscito	Report

=== Group D ===
Venue: Petros Kapagerov National Swimming Hall, Piraeus, Greece.

Pos	Team	Pld	W	D	L	GF	GA	GD	Pts	Qualification
1	(Hungary) UVSE	4	4	0	0	49	31	+18	12	Quarterfinals
2	(Italy) Orizzonte Catania	4	3	0	1	51	25	+26	9	Quarterfinals
3	(Russia) Dynamo Uralochka	4	2	0	2	46	43	+3	6	
4	(Greece) Ethnikos	4	1	0	3	40	50	−10	3	
5	(France) Lille UC	4	0	0	4	22	59	−37	0	

Source: LEN

Date	Time^{‡}		Score		
24 Jan	17:30	Ethnikos	14–5	Lille	Report
24 Jan	19:15	Uralochka	6–15	Orizzonte	Report
25 Jan	10:00	Orizzonte	6–9	UVSE	Report
25 Jan	11:45	Lille	7–14	Uralochka	Report
25 Jan	18:15	Uralochka	9–11	UVSE	Report
25 Jan	20:00	Ethnikos	5–15	Orizzonte	Report
26 Jan	18:00	Ethnikos	10–17	Uralochka	Report
26 Jan	19:45	UVSE	16–5	Lille	Report
27 Jan	10:00	Lille	5–15	Orizzonte	Report
27 Jan	11:45	Ethnikos	11–13	UVSE	Report

^{†} All times are local

== Knockout stage ==
=== Quarterfinals ===
The draw took place at LEN headquarters in Nyon, Switzerland, on 29 January 2019.

Team 1	Agg.	Team 2	1st leg	2nd leg
Kinef Kirishi (Russia)	18–19	(Greece) NC Vouliagmeni	11–10	7–9
Orizzonte Catania (Italy)	20–23	(Spain) CN Sabadell	9–12	11–11
UVSE (Hungary)	13–14	(Italy) Plebiscito Padova	6–6	7–8
CN Sant Andreu (Spain)	13–26	(Greece) Olympiacos	7–16	6–10

==== First leg ====
23 Feb 2019; 13:00 (UTC+3)	Report	Kinef Kirishi (Russia)	11–10	(Greece) NC Vouliagmeni	Neftyanik Sports Complex (Kirishi); Referees: Putniković (SRB), Petik (HUN)
23 Feb 2019; 13:00 (UTC+3)	Report	Score by quarters: 3–5, 2–1, 4–4, 2–0			Neftyanik Sports Complex (Kirishi); Referees: Putniković (SRB), Petik (HUN)
23 Feb 2019; 13:00 (UTC+3)	Report	4: Simanovich; 3: Zubkova	Goals	4: Charalampidi; 3: Jordan	Neftyanik Sports Complex (Kirishi); Referees: Putniković (SRB), Petik (HUN)

23 Feb 2019; 16:45 (UTC+1)	Report	CN Sant Andreu (Spain)	7–16	(Greece) Olympiacos	Piscina Pere Serrat (Barcelona); Referees: Colombo (ITA), Marjay (HUN)
23 Feb 2019; 16:45 (UTC+1)	Report	Score by quarters: 2–3, 0–4, 4–4, 1–5			Piscina Pere Serrat (Barcelona); Referees: Colombo (ITA), Marjay (HUN)
23 Feb 2019; 16:45 (UTC+1)	Report	2: Sleeking; 1: five players	Goals	4: Asimaki; 3: Avramidou	Piscina Pere Serrat (Barcelona); Referees: Colombo (ITA), Marjay (HUN)

23 Feb 2019; 18:00 (UTC+1)	Report	Orizzonte Catania (Italy)	9–12	(Spain) CN Sabadell	Piscina di Nesima (Catania); Referees: Markopoulou (GRE), Matache (ROU)
23 Feb 2019; 18:00 (UTC+1)	Report	Score by quarters: 2–3, 1–3, 2–3, 4–3			Piscina di Nesima (Catania); Referees: Markopoulou (GRE), Matache (ROU)
23 Feb 2019; 18:00 (UTC+1)	Report	4: Marletta; 2: Bianconi	Goals	3: Ortiz; 2: García, Neushul, Leitón	Piscina di Nesima (Catania); Referees: Markopoulou (GRE), Matache (ROU)

23 Feb 2019; 20:00 (UTC+1)	Report	UVSE (Hungary)	6–6	(Italy) Plebiscito Padova	Alfréd Hajós National Swimming Stadium (Budapest); Referees: Achladiotis (GRE), Mišković (MNE)
23 Feb 2019; 20:00 (UTC+1)	Report	Score by quarters: 2–1, 2–1, 0–3, 2–1			Alfréd Hajós National Swimming Stadium (Budapest); Referees: Achladiotis (GRE), Mišković (MNE)
23 Feb 2019; 20:00 (UTC+1)	Report	2: Keszthelyi, Faragó	Goals	2 :Queirolo	Alfréd Hajós National Swimming Stadium (Budapest); Referees: Achladiotis (GRE), Mišković (MNE)

==== Second leg ====
9 Mar 2019; 16:45 (UTC+2)	Report	Olympiacos (Greece)	10–6	(Spain) CN Sant Andreu	Petros Kapagerov National Swimming Hall (Piraeus); Referees: Várkonyi (HUN), Goncharenko (UKR)
9 Mar 2019; 16:45 (UTC+2)	Report	Score by quarters: 4–2, 2–1, 2–1, 2–2			Petros Kapagerov National Swimming Hall (Piraeus); Referees: Várkonyi (HUN), Goncharenko (UKR)
9 Mar 2019; 16:45 (UTC+2)	Report	2: Eggens, Eleftheriadou; 1: six players	Goals	2: Jackovich; 1: four players	Petros Kapagerov National Swimming Hall (Piraeus); Referees: Várkonyi (HUN), Goncharenko (UKR)

9 Mar 2019; 18:00 (UTC+1)	Report	Plebiscito Padova (Italy)	8–7	(Hungary) UVSE	Centro Sportivo del Plebiscito (Padua); Referees: Dreval (RUS), Raković (SRB)
9 Mar 2019; 18:00 (UTC+1)	Report	Score by quarters: 2–5, 2–1, 2–1, 2–0			Centro Sportivo del Plebiscito (Padua); Referees: Dreval (RUS), Raković (SRB)
9 Mar 2019; 18:00 (UTC+1)	Report	3: Barzon; 2: Grab	Goals	3: Keszthelyi; 1: four players	Centro Sportivo del Plebiscito (Padua); Referees: Dreval (RUS), Raković (SRB)

9 Mar 2019; 20:00 (UTC+2)	Report	NC Vouliagmeni (Greece)	9–7	(Russia) Kinef Kirishi	Halandri Municipal Swimming Center (Chalandri); Referees: Peris (CRO), Mauss (GER)
9 Mar 2019; 20:00 (UTC+2)	Report	Score by quarters: 3–1, 2–3, 3–2, 1–1			Halandri Municipal Swimming Center (Chalandri); Referees: Peris (CRO), Mauss (GER)
9 Mar 2019; 20:00 (UTC+2)	Report	3: Xenaki; 2: Elliniadi	Goals	2: Zubkova, Prokofyeva, Simanovich	Halandri Municipal Swimming Center (Chalandri); Referees: Peris (CRO), Mauss (GER)

12 Mar 2019; 19:00 (UTC+1)	Report	CN Sabadell (Spain)	11–11	(Italy) Orizzonte Catania	Centre Can Llong (Sabadell); Referees: Debreceni (HUN), Boudramis (GRE)
12 Mar 2019; 19:00 (UTC+1)	Report	Score by quarters: 3–3, 2–1, 4–2, 2–5			Centre Can Llong (Sabadell); Referees: Debreceni (HUN), Boudramis (GRE)
12 Mar 2019; 19:00 (UTC+1)	Report	3: Ortiz, Forca; 2: Neushul	Goals	6: Garibotti; 2: Aiello	Centre Can Llong (Sabadell); Referees: Debreceni (HUN), Boudramis (GRE)

=== Final Four ===
The allocation of the final 4 in Sabadell and the draw of the semifinals were announced by LEN on 13 March 2019. The Spanish team hosted the finals for the second time (the first one was the 2016 edition).

==== Semifinals ====
19 Apr 2019; 11:30 (UTC+1)	Report	NC Vouliagmeni (Greece)	7–8	(Greece) Olympiacos	Centre Can Llong (Sabadell); Referees: Mauss (GER), Margeta (SLO)
19 Apr 2019; 11:30 (UTC+1)	Report	Score by quarters: 2–2, 2–2, 2–3, 1–1			Centre Can Llong (Sabadell); Referees: Mauss (GER), Margeta (SLO)
19 Apr 2019; 11:30 (UTC+1)	Report	3: Chydirioti; 2: Charalampidi	Goals	4: Avramidou; 1: four players	Centre Can Llong (Sabadell); Referees: Mauss (GER), Margeta (SLO)

19 Apr 2019; 13:15 (UTC+1)	Report	Plebiscito Padova (Italy)	5–8	(Spain) CN Sabadell	Centre Can Llong (Sabadell); Referees: Várkonyi (HUN), Naumov (RUS)
19 Apr 2019; 13:15 (UTC+1)	Report	Score by quarters: 1–1, 2–4, 1–3, 1–0			Centre Can Llong (Sabadell); Referees: Várkonyi (HUN), Naumov (RUS)
19 Apr 2019; 13:15 (UTC+1)	Report	3: Barzon	Goals	3: Steffens; 2: Forca	Centre Can Llong (Sabadell); Referees: Várkonyi (HUN), Naumov (RUS)

==== Finals ====
3rd place

20 Apr 2019; 11:30 (UTC+1)	Report	Plebiscito Padova (Italy)	7–8	(Greece) NC Vouliagmeni	Centre Can Llong (Sabadell); Referees: Várkonyi (HUN), Margeta (SLO)
20 Apr 2019; 11:30 (UTC+1)	Report	Score by quarters: 1–2, 2–4, 2–0, 2–2			Centre Can Llong (Sabadell); Referees: Várkonyi (HUN), Margeta (SLO)
20 Apr 2019; 11:30 (UTC+1)	Report	3: Barzon; 1: four players	Goals	2: Chydirioti, Jordan	Centre Can Llong (Sabadell); Referees: Várkonyi (HUN), Margeta (SLO)

1st place

20 Apr 2019; 13:15 (UTC+1)	Report	CN Sabadell (Spain)	13–11	(Greece) Olympiacos	Centre Can Llong (Sabadell); Attendance: 1000; Referees: Mauss (GER), Naumov (RUS)
20 Apr 2019; 13:15 (UTC+1)	Report	Score by quarters: 2–3, 4–3, 2–3, 5–2			Centre Can Llong (Sabadell); Attendance: 1000; Referees: Mauss (GER), Naumov (RUS)
20 Apr 2019; 13:15 (UTC+1)	Report	4: Neushul; 3: Ortiz	Goals	4: Buckling; 2: Plevritou, Tsoukala	Centre Can Llong (Sabadell); Attendance: 1000; Referees: Mauss (GER), Naumov (RUS)

2018–19 LEN Euro League Women
Champions

CN Sabadell
5th title

Final standings

	Team
Gold medal	(Spain) CN Sabadell
Silver medal	(Greece) Olympiacos
Bronze medal	(Greece) NC Vouliagmeni
4	(Italy) Plebiscito Padova

== See also ==
- 2018–19 LEN Champions League
- 2018–19 Women's LEN Trophy
