= Aurelien Cousin =

Maltese water polo player (born 1980)

Aurélien Cousin born in France on February 1, 1980, is a Maltese international water polo player, and he coaches the women's water polo team of sirens and is head coach of the women's national team.

== Personal life ==
Cousin was naturalised in March 2015 further to his marriage to a Maltese female and on "sporting merits".

His naturalisation came along with controversy as it was deemed too fast by rival teams, especially Neptunes WPSC, who claimed that it was too fast-tracked unlike that of footballers Alfred Effiong and Joseph Mbong whose Maltese citizenship took much more time to be granted. Both the San Giljan A.S.C. and the Aquatic Sports Association of Malta administrations denied any interference. It was claimed that since he was seen training again in February 2015, he must have known he would soon become eligible.

== Club career ==
Aurélien Cousin made his first swims at CN Livry Gargan in 1989. He then went to Racing Club de France where he made his Championnat de France (water polo) debut. At 17, he went to Olympic Nice and won his first titles of the French first league (from 1997 to 2001) and 2 French Cups (2000 and 2001). After a season with CN Marseille (2001–2002), Aurélien became the first French to start in one of the major European Championships, precisely with RN Bogliasco (2002–2003). The following year he returned to Nice for 3 seasons (from 2003 to 2007) and won 2 new titles of Champion of France. In 2007 he signed for SN Strasbourg for 4 seasons. He used to play in France for 9 months a year and visit Malta to take on the Maltese water polo Premier League in summer.

Cousin was introduced to Malta by Exiles S.C. He was a player and eventually coached them, resigning in 2014. He came out of retirement to play for San Giljan A.S.C. Cousin was an important player for San Giljan, having contributed towards honours such as the Summer League 2017. He left to return to Exiles to see off his retirement, in September 2017.

== International career ==
He was a member of the France men's national water polo team, and obtained over 150 caps.

After being naturalised in March 2015, he became a member of the Malta men's national water polo team.

He was included for the tournament squad during the final phase of the 2016 Men's European Water Polo Championship and the 2018 Men's European Water Polo Championship He was the oldest player at the tournament.

== Coaching career ==
Cousin coached Exiles S.C. and was instrumental in introducing young players into the squad. He resigned in April 2014.
