= Slovakia women's national under-18 football team =

National association football team

Slovakia Women's U-18
- Association: Slovak Football Association
- Confederation: UEFA (Europe)
- FIFA code: SVK

First international
- Poland 1–1 Slovakia, (23 October 1996)

Biggest win
- Slovakia 14–0 Bosnia and Herzegovina, (8 October 1998)

Biggest defeat
- Sweden 6–0 Slovakia, (10 October 1998)

Slovakia women's national under-19 football team was founded in 1996 as the U-18 team. the Slovak women's football team under 18 years of age was coached by Pavol Peráček. Assistant coach Štefan Tarkovič. In the summer of 2001, the age limit was raised to 19 years. Only players born on or after January 1, 1980, were eligible to play on this team. There were also three football players in this national team, who also played in parallel in Slovakia women's national football team.

== Results ==
The following is a chronological list of results of matches of the Slovak women's junior national team - U18.

=== 1996–1997 ===
23 October 1996 Frend	Poland	1–1	Slovakia	Poland
	? NO.9 45'		Vričanová 21'	Stadium: Zakopané

14 May 1997 Frend	Slovakia	0–0	Poland	Slovakia
				Stadium: Poprad

8 September 1997 Frend	Czech Republic	3–1	Slovakia	Czech Republic
16:00	Zahoříková 21', 75'; Danielová 40'	Report	Beregszasziova 28'	Stadium: Brumov; Attendance: 400; Referee: Puček Lubomír (Czech Republic)

11 Septembra 1997 Frend	Slovakia	0–1	Czech Republic	Slovakia
15:00		Report	Kozlová 57'	Stadium: Ilava; Attendance: 220

5 Octobra 1997 Preparatory match	Slovakia	3–1	Slovakia Žilina	Žilina
	Beregszasziova 15'; Jarošová 35'; Čilliková 43', 76'		Kluchová 40'; Porubčanová 28'	Stadium: TJ Tatran Bytčica

=== Preliminary Round – Group 5 (in Germany) ===
Team	Pts	Pld	W	D	L	GF	GA	GD	
Germany	9	3	3	0	0	22	0	+22	Qualified for ME Women U-18
Yugoslavia	4	3	1	1	1	4	8	-4	
Poland	4	3	1	1	1	2	12	−10	
Slovakia	0	3	0	0	3	1	9	-8	

14 Octobra 1997 ME Women U-18	Yugoslavia	3–1	Slovakia	Schwarzenfeld
	?; ?; ?	Report	Girašeková

16 Octobra 1997 ME Women U-18	Poland	1–0	Slovakia	Cham
	?	Report

18 Octobra 1997 ME Women U-18	Germany	5–0	Slovakia	Weiden
	?; ?; ?; ?; ?	Report

=== Preliminary Round – Group 7 (in Sweden) ===
Team	Pts	Pld	W	D	L	GF	GA	GD	
Sweden	6	2	2	0	0	26	0	+26	Qualified for ME Women U-18
Slovakia	4	2	1	0	1	14	6	+8	
Bosnia and Herzegovina	0	2	0	0	2	0	34	−34	

8 October 1998 ME Women U-18	Slovakia	14–0	Bosnia and Herzegovina	Karlskrona
	Ižová; ?; ?; ?; ?; ?; ?	Report		Stadium: Karlskrona

10 October 1998 ME Women U-18	Sweden	6–0	Slovakia	Sölvesborg
	?; ?; ?; ?; ?; ?	Report		Stadium: Sölvesborg

=== Group B5 (in Bulgaria) ===
Team	Pts	Pld	W	D	L	GF	GA	GD	
Belgium	6	2	2	0	0	5	2	+3	Qualified for ME Women U-18
Slovakia	3	2	1	0	1	3	2	+1	Qualified for ME Women U-18
Belarus	0	2	0	0	2	2	6	−4	
Greece	0	0	0	0	0	0	0	0	withdrew

31 August 1999 ME Women U-18	Slovakia	3–0	Belarus	Slovakia
	?; ?; ?	Report		Stadium: Dubnica nad Vahom

4 September 1999 ME Women U-18	Belgium	2–0	Slovakia	Slovakia
	?; ?	Report		Stadium: Trenčín

=== Second Round – Group B2 (October 25–29, 1999 in Huttwil, Switzerland) ===
Team	Pts	Pld	W	D	L	GF	GA	GD	
Switzerland	7	3	2	1	0	3	0	+3	Qualified for ME Women U-18
Spain	6	3	2	0	1	4	2	+2	
Iceland	4	3	1	1	1	5	3	+2	
Slovakia	0	3	0	0	3	1	8	-7	

25 October 1999 ME Women U-18	Iceland	4–1	Slovakia	Hochdorf
	?; ?; ?; ?	Report	?	Stadium: Hochdorf

27 October 1999 ME Women U-18	Spain	2–0	Slovakia	Emmenbrücke
	?; ?	Report		Stadium: Emmenbrücke

28 October 1999 ME Women U-18	Switzerland	2–0	Slovakia	Emmenbrücke
	?; ?	Report		Stadium: Emmenbrücke

=== Group B5 (in Bulgaria) ===
Team	Pts	Pld	W	D	L	GF	GA	GD	
Belgium	9	3	3	0	0	7	3	+4	Qualified for ME Women U-18
Russia	3	3	1	0	2	5	5	0	
Hungary	3	3	1	0	2	6	7	−1	
Slovakia	3	3	1	0	2	3	7	−4	

30 November 2000 ME Women U-18	Belgium	4–1	Slovakia	Bulgaria
	?; ?; ?; ?	Report	?	Stadium: Albena

30 November 2000 ME Women U-18	Slovakia	2–1	Hungary	Bulgaria
	?; ?	Report	?	Stadium: Albena

30 November 2000 ME Women U-18	Slovakia	0–2	Russia	Bulgaria
		Report	?; ?	Stadium: Albena

=== Group B2 (in Poland) ===
Team	Pts	Pld	W	D	L	GF	GA	GD	
Netherlands	7	3	2	1	0	7	0	+7	Qualified for ME Women U-18
Poland	7	3	2	1	0	2	0	+2	
Wales	3	3	1	0	2	2	4	−2	
Slovakia	0	3	0	0	3	0	7	−7	

10 Octobra 2001 ME Women U-18	Netherlands	4–0	Slovakia	Poland
	?; ?; ?; ?	Report		Stadium: Tuchola

12 Octobra 2001 ME Women U-18	Slovakia	0–2	Wales	Poland
		Report	?; ?	Stadium: Kruszwica

14 Octobra 2001 ME Women U-18	Poland	1–0	Slovakia	Poland
	?	Report		Stadium: Toruń

== List of players ==
=== Under-18 ===
Contains a chronological overview of the players who represented Slovakia from 1996 to 2002 in official international matches.

=== Slovakia national football team ===
Footballer	Date of birth	Match	Goals	Debut	End	Club
Siverová Martina GK	1979	5	0	1996	1998	(Slovakia) Olympia Košice
Janečková Anita GK	1979	5	0	1996	1998	(Slovakia) Delta Bratislava / Tatra poisťovna Bratislava
Čillíková Katarína	22.01.1980	9	2	1996	1998	(Slovakia) ŠFK VIX Žilina
Petrovová Eva	19.11.1979	6	0	1996	1998	(Slovakia) Olympia Košice
Budošová Andrea	15.05.1980	6	0	1996	1999	(Slovakia) ŠFK VIX Žilina, (Slovakia) Hoffman Čadca
Girašeková Katarína	24.08.1980	8	1	1996	1999	(Slovakia) Prešov
Beregszasziova Kamila	03.05.1980	5	2	1996	1997	(Slovakia) Olympia Košice
Botková Hana	04.12.1978	2	0	1996	1997	(Slovakia) Trnava
Surovcová Edita	16.07.1978	2	0	1996	1997	(Slovakia) ŠFK VIX Žilina
Kováčová Katarína	1980	7	0	1996	1998	(Slovakia) Delta Bratislava / Tatra poisťovna Bratislava
Vričanová Monika	1978	2	1	1996	1997	(Slovakia) Beluša
Pilarová Maria	1978	2	0	1996	1997	(Slovakia) Beluša
Struhárová Katarína	1978	2	0	1996	1997	(Slovakia) Delta Bratislava / Tatra poisťovna Bratislava
Pacachová Lenka	1980	2	0	1996	1999	(Slovakia) Prešov
Angermayerová Silvia	14.02.1978	8	0	1996	1998	(Slovakia) Delta Bratislava / Tatra poisťovna Bratislava
Marunová Mária	1978	1	0	1996	1997	(Slovakia) Trnava
Krišková Hana	1980	1	0	1997	1999	(Slovakia) Delta Bratislava / Tatra poisťovna Bratislava
Jarošová Zuzana	1981	7	1	1996	2000	(Slovakia) Delta Bratislava / Tatra poisťovna Bratislava
Riháková Andrea	25.01.1978	2	0	1996	1997	(Slovakia) ŠK Slovan Bratislava (women)
Varečková Erika	1980	2	0	1996	1999	(Slovakia) ŠK Slovan Bratislava (women)
Kňížátová Monika	1978	1	0	1996	1997	(Slovakia) ŠK Slovan Bratislava (women)
Kubáňová Dušana	1980	8	0	1997	1999	(Slovakia) ŠFK VIX Žilina
Šilonová Diana	1980	9	0	1997	1999	(Slovakia) Delta Bratislava / Tatra poisťovna Bratislava
Muchová Maracela	1979	4	0	1996	1998	(Slovakia) Prešov
Hryzáková Jana	1979	4	0	1997	1998	(Slovakia) ŠFK VIX Žilina
Krajčovičová Jana	1980	4	0	1998	1999	(Slovakia) Trnava
Natafalušiová Mária	1981	6	0	1998	2000	(Slovakia) Prešov
Oroszová Aneta	1980	9	0	1997	1999	(Slovakia) Olympia Košice
Kočicová Katarína	1979	5	0	1996	1998	(Slovakia) Spoje Bratislava
Pagáčová Katarína GK	1981	2	0	1998	2000	(Slovakia) Ilava
Ižová Marcela	17.09.1981	2	8	1998	2000	(Slovakia) Olympia Košice
Habudová Silvia	1981	2	0	1998	2000	(Slovakia) ŠK Slovan Bratislava (women)
Petrovičová Eva	1982	2	0	1998	2001	(Slovakia) Veľký Krtíš
Guňová Miroslava	1982	2	0	1998	2001	(Slovakia) Prešov
Rigotti Natália	1983	2	0	1998	2002	(Slovakia) ŠK Slovan Bratislava (women)
Kiňová Brigita	1980	2	0	1997	1999	(Slovakia) Prešov
Pinterová Lenka	1980	2	0	1998	1999	(Slovakia) ŠK Slovan Bratislava (women)
Brichtová Lenka	1981	2	0	1997	2000	(Slovakia) Holič
Novotná Soňa	1980	2	0	1996	1999	(Slovakia) Delta Bratislava / Tatra poisťovna Bratislava
Horná Katarína	1980	2	0	1996	1999	(Slovakia) Dolný Kubín

== See also ==
- Slovakia women's national football team
- Slovakia women's national under-17 football team
- FIFA U-20 Women's World Cup
- UEFA Women's Under-19 Championship
