= Kamila Beregszasziova =

Slovak footballer (born 1980)

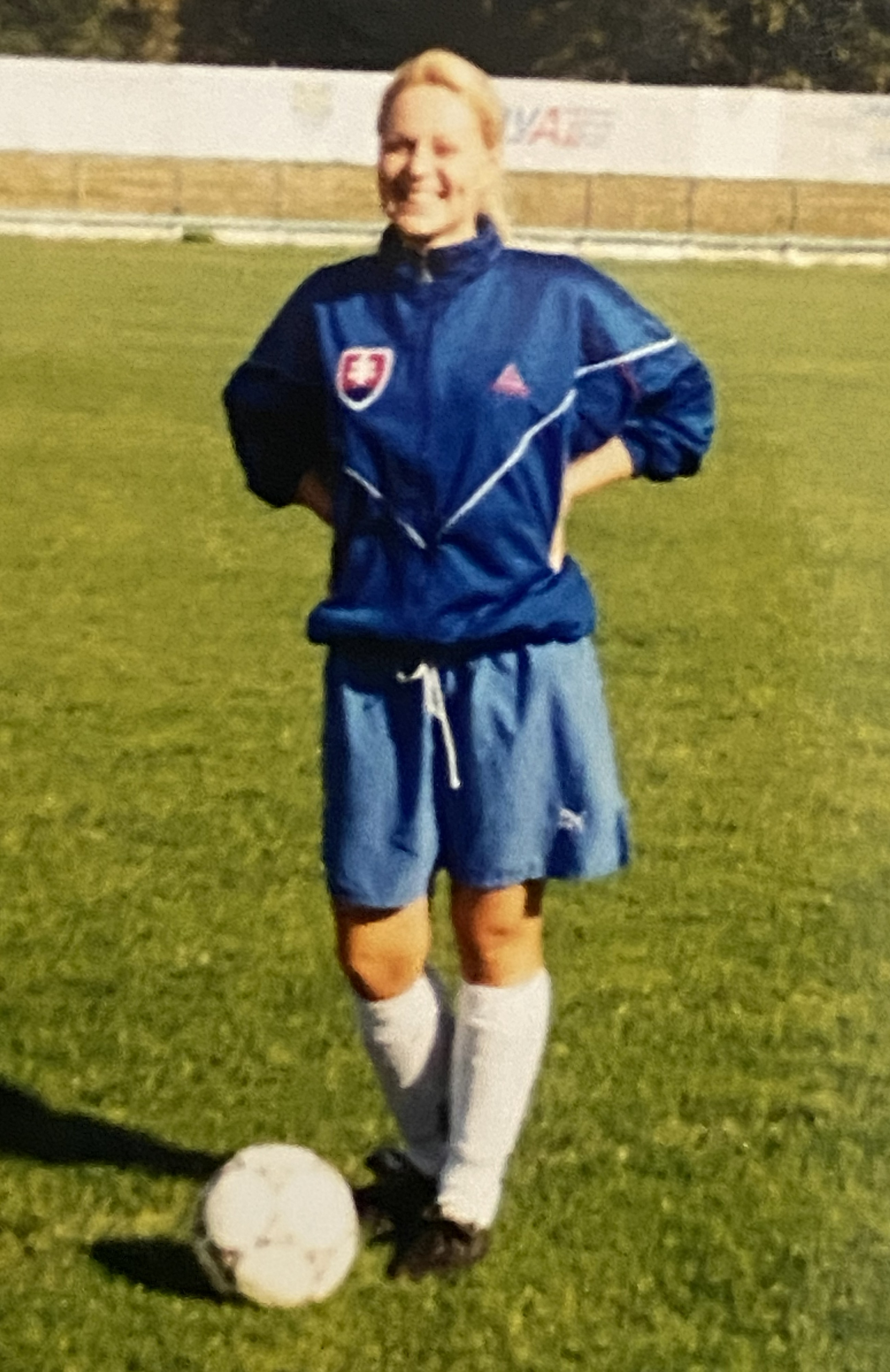
- Kamila Beregszásziová in the Slovakia national team kit (2001)

Personal information
- Birth name: Kamila Beregszásziová
- Date of birth: May 3, 1980 (age 46)
- Place of birth: Košice, ČSSR, Slovakia
- Height: 1.70 m (5 ft 7 in)
- Position: Striker

Senior career*
Years	Team	Apps	(Gls)
1995–2001	Olympia Košice	120	(131)

International career
1996–1997	Slovakia U18	5	(2)
1996–2001	Slovakia	32	(18)
- * Club domestic league appearances and goals

Kamila Beregszasziova (born May 3, 1980, in Košice, Slovakia) is a former Slovak footballer who made her debut for the senior national team at the age 16. In her second appearance for the Slovakia senior national team, which was also her first home appearance at senior international level, Beregszásziová faced Norway at the age of 16, with Norway being the reigning world champions and recent bronze medallists at the 1996 Summer Olympics.

In 2001, she finished 20th in the voting for the inaugural women's FIFA World Player of the Year award (later known as The Best FIFA Women's Player), becoming the first Slovak female footballer to be listed in the final standings. She was also the only Slovak representative listed in either the men's or women's final standings that year.

She ended her playing career in early 2002 at the age of 21.

== Contemporary media coverage ==
Contemporary Slovak press described Beregszásziová as a goalscoring forward and commented on her playing style. Some reports also compared her to male footballers of the period, including Ronaldo.

== Career ==
=== Beginnings ===
Beregszásziová began playing football at a young age in her hometown of Sokoľany, where she initially played with boys.

In 1995, former Czechoslovak First League striker Alojz Martinček noticed the 15-year-old Beregszásziová while she was playing football in a park in Košice and brought her to Olympia Košice. Martinček set the record for the most goals scored by a Slovak player in a single Czechoslovak top-flight match in 1961, scoring six goals for Tatran Prešov in an 8–1 league victory over Slovan Nitra.

=== Club career ===
==== Olympia Košice (1995 - 2001) ====
Beregszásziová spent her entire club career with Olympia Košice, playing for the club from August 1995 until the end of 2001. She made her senior club debut on 26 August 1995 at the age of 15 under coach Martin Benko.

Her first league goal came on 2 October 1995 in a 5–1 victory over Čadca, and in November she scored her first two goals in a single match against Rimavská Sobota. In June 1996, representing the Košice City Selection, Beregszásziová won the Slovak high school football championship (SAŠŠ) and finished as the tournament’s top scorer.In the 1995–96 season, she was Olympia’s leading scorer with 13 league goals and finished fourth in the league scoring standings. Later that year, she made her senior international debut for Slovakia before making her first appearance for the national under-18 team.

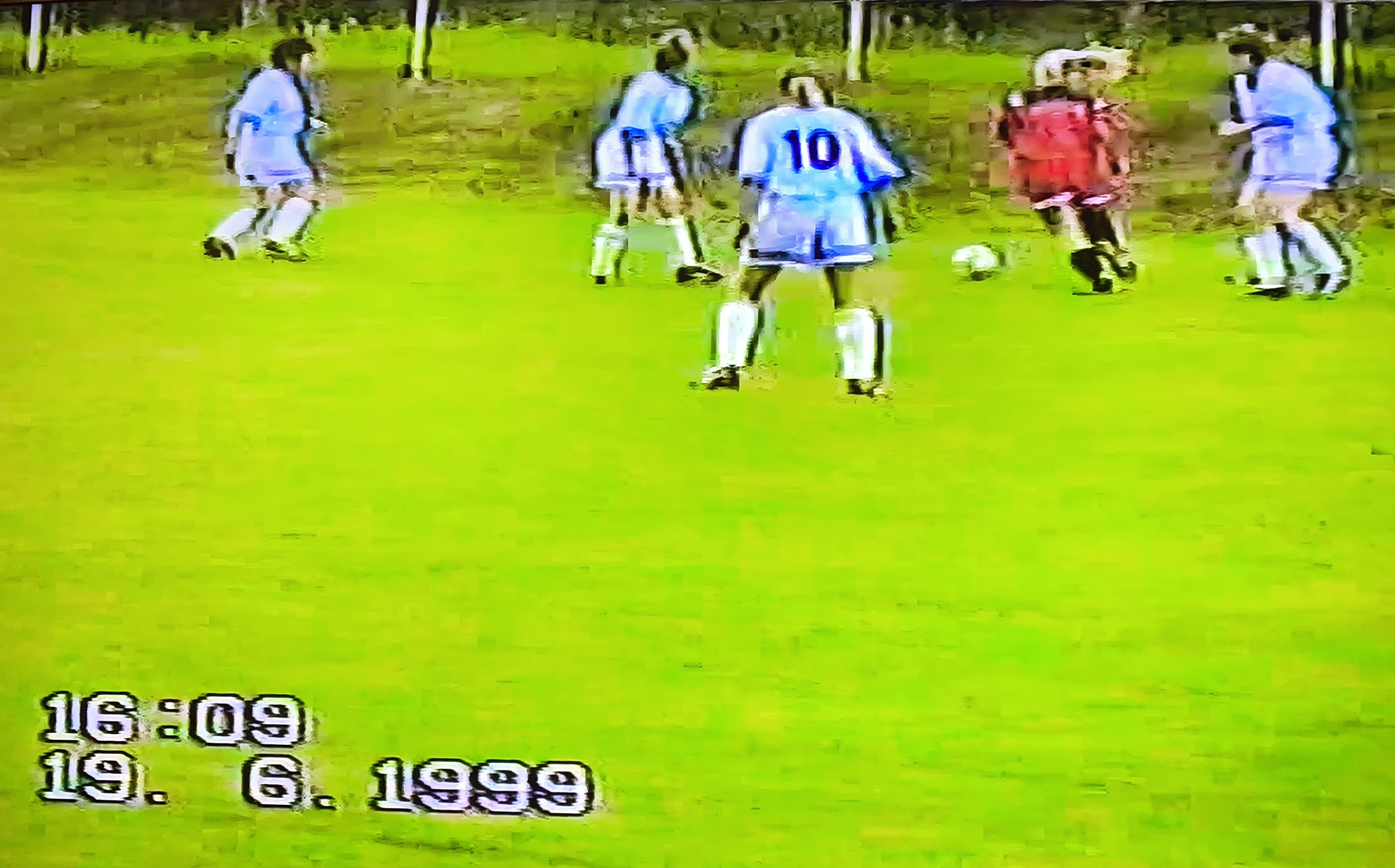
Beregszásziová (in red) scoring the equalising goal against Slovan Bratislava during the final tournament of the 1998–99 Slovak Women’s First League.

During the 1996–97 season, Beregszásziová recorded her first league hat-tricks and also scored four goals in a match against DFC Ilava. She later scored six goals in a single league match, becoming only the second player reported to have achieved the feat in the history of the competition. She finished the season as the league’s second-highest scorer with 24 goals. For her performances in 1996, Beregszásziová was selected for Slovakia’s Women’s Team of the Year at the age of 16. Košice newspaper ‘‘Korzo’’ wrote that “a little star has shone at Olympia”.In February 1997, at the international Stoma Cup indoor tournament in Hradec Králové, she received the tournament’s award for the most likeable player; contemporary reports also noted interest from AC Sparta Prague.

Beregszásziová remained Olympia’s leading league scorer throughout her six full seasons with the club. During the final tournament of the 1998–99 season, she scored four goals, including an equaliser against Slovan Bratislava, as Olympia finished as league runners-up.

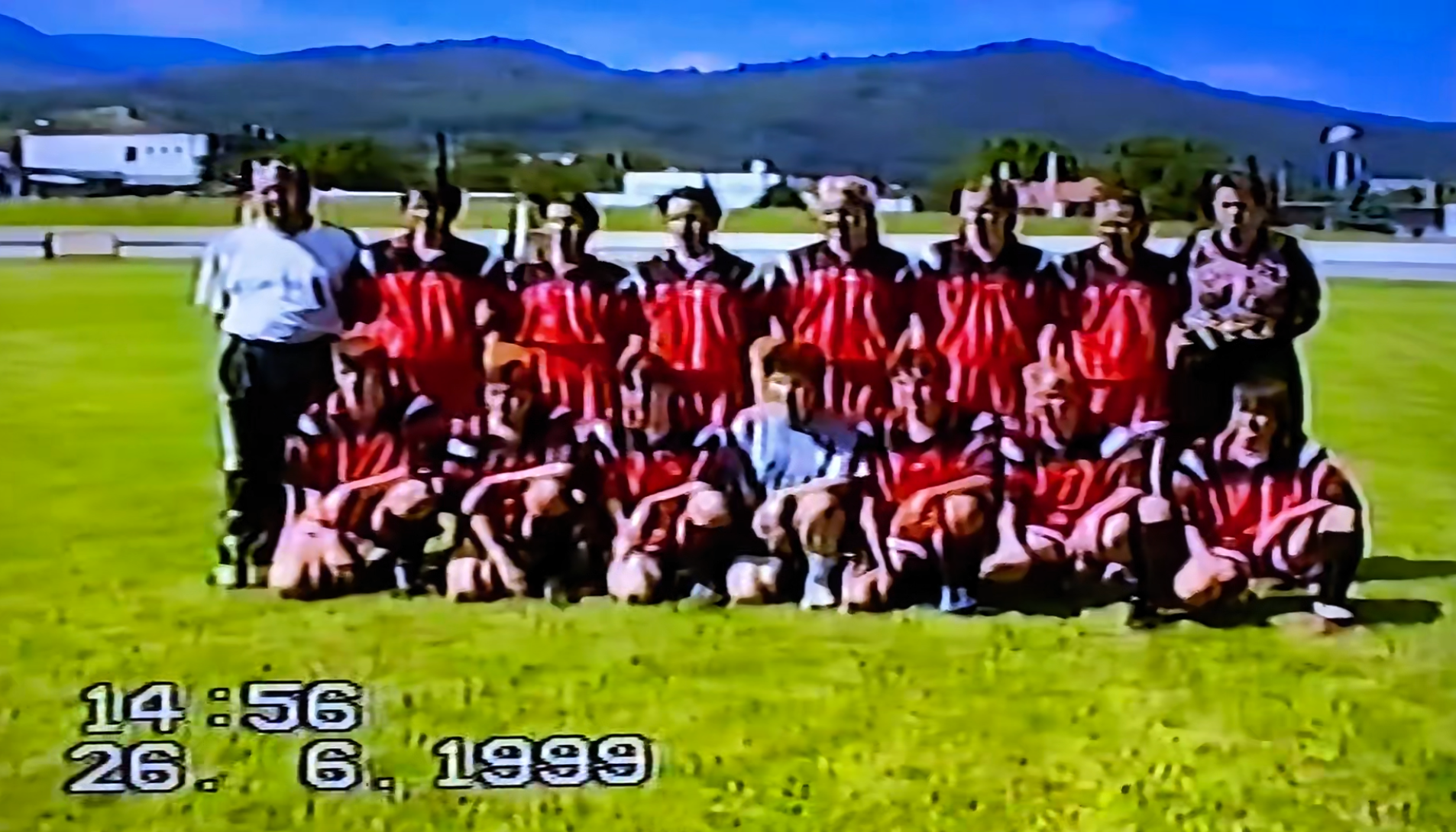
TJ Olympia Košice after the final tournament of the 1998–99 season, when the club finished as runners-up in the Slovak Women’s First League. Beregszásziová is also pictured.

She finished second in the league scoring standings three times, in 1996–97, 1998–99 and 2000–01, and third in 1999–2000. She was selected for Slovakia’s Women’s Team of the Year four times, in 1996, 1999, 2000 and 2001. She was not selected in 1998 despite scoring four goals in that year’s European Championship qualifying campaign. Asked by the sports press about her omission, Beregszásziová replied, ‘’“Time will tell.”’’

Olympia finished as Slovak league runners-up in 1998–99 and 2000–01 and third in 1999–2000.

In 2001, Beregszásziová scored her 100th league goal. She finished the 2000–01 season as the league’s second-highest scorer and ended her Olympia Košice career with 131 league goals.

During her playing career, Beregszásziová studied at the Technical University of Košice.

In December 2000, Slovakia international Szilárd Németh, when asked about women’s footballers in Slovakia, said:

“Eleven women's football names in Slovakia?! Ladies, don't be offended, I don't know eleven of your names. I do know who Beregszásziová is in Košice.”

— Szilárd Németh, 18 December 2000.

== Slovak national team ==
=== Senior national team (1996-2001) ===
Beregszásziová made 32 senior international appearances for the Slovakia national team and scored 18 goals, including 13 in competitive internationals and five in friendlies.

She made her senior competitive international debut at the age of 16 years and 103 days against Finland on 14 August 1996, starting the UEFA Women's Euro 1997 qualifier. Her senior international debut preceded her first appearance for Slovakia at under-18 level. Later that year, she also represented the newly established Slovakia under-18 team, whose first international match was a friendly against Poland.

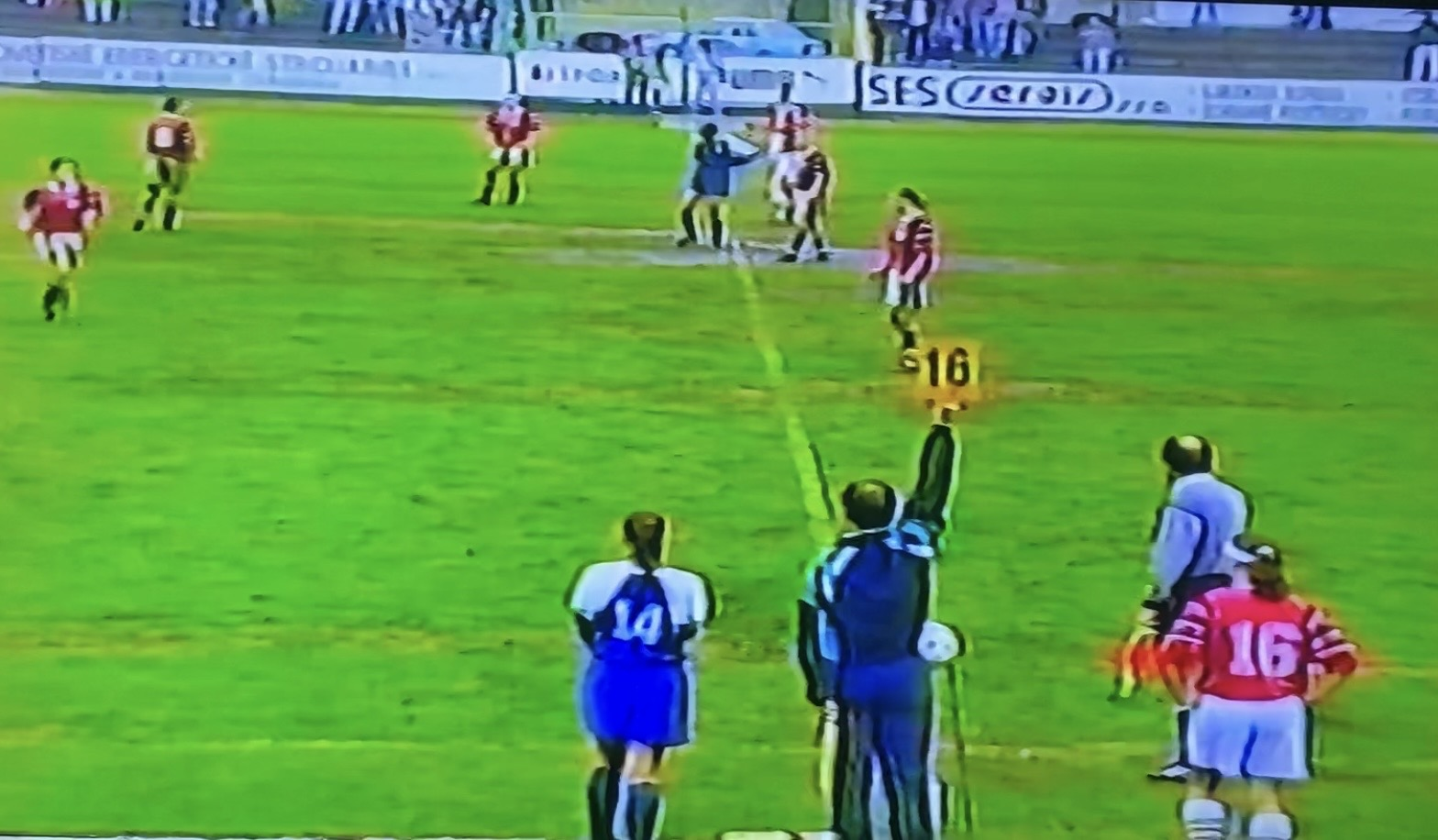
Beregszásziová (No. 14) entering the UEFA Women's Euro 1997 qualifier against Norway, the reigning world champions and 1996 Olympic bronze medallists, on 31 August 1996 in Levice, aged 16.

In only her second senior international appearance, on 31 August 1996, the 16-year-old Beregszásziová faced Norway in Levice in a UEFA Women's Euro 1997 qualifier. Norway entered the match as the reigning FIFA Women's World Cup champions and bronze medallists from the 1996 Olympic Games. Following Slovakia's UEFA Women's Euro 1997 qualifying play-off against Belgium in Michalovce on 28 September 1996, Beregszásziová remained on the pitch signing autographs.

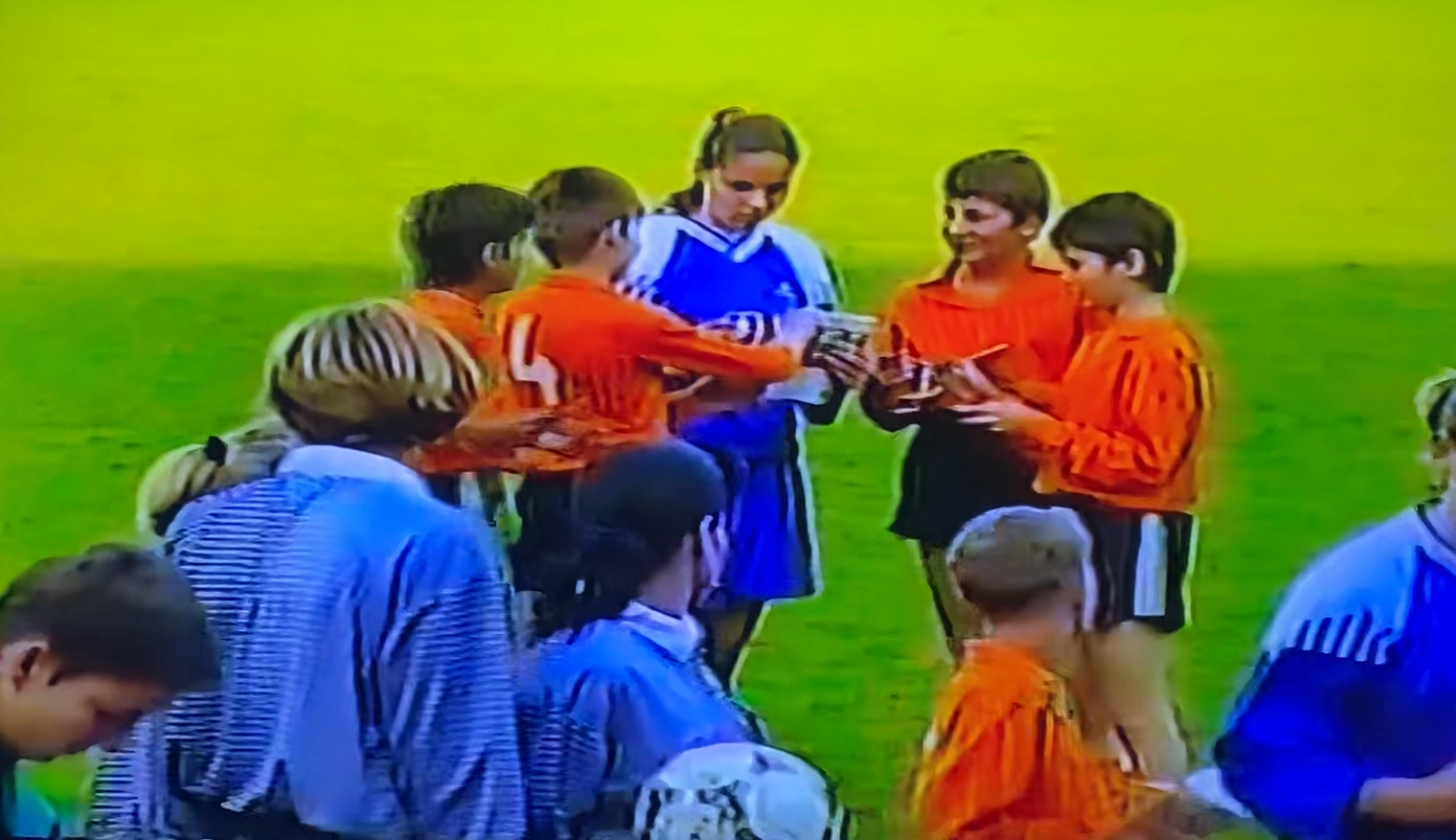
Kamila Beregszasziova signing autographs after the UEFA Women’s Euro 1997 qualifying play-off match between Slovakia and Belgium, 28 September 1996, Michalovce.

During Slovakia's first FIFA Women's World Cup qualifying campaign, for the 1999 tournament, Beregszásziová scored her first senior competitive international goal at the age of 17 years and 122 days in an 11–0 victory over Bosnia and Herzegovina on 2 September 1997. Six days later, on 8 September, she scored her first goal for Slovakia under-18 against the Czech Republic in Brumov, equalising at 1–1 in the first meeting between the two countries at women's under-18 level.

On 1 April 1998, still aged 17 years and 332 days, Beregszásziová scored twice against Israel in a 4–0 World Cup qualifying victory. One month later, on 1 May 1998, she opened the scoring in the second minute against Bosnia and Herzegovina in a 7–0 qualifying victory. She finished Slovakia's first World Cup qualifying campaign with four goals in seven appearances, all scored before her 18th birthday.

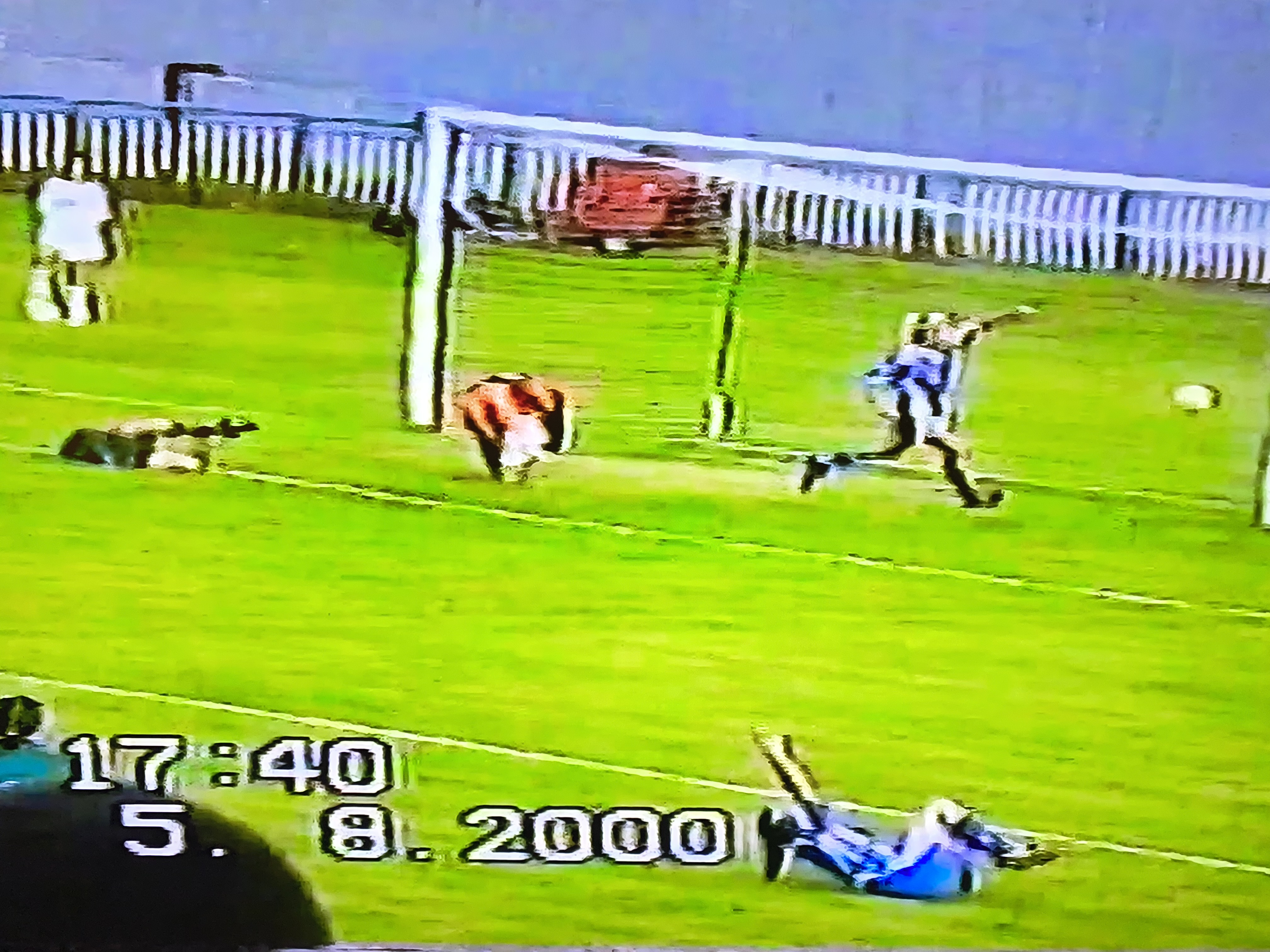
Beregszásziová scoring against Belarus in UEFA Women's Euro 2001 qualifying on 5 August 2000 in Stropkov, in front of approximately 3,200 spectators.

Beregszásziová then scored five goals in six matches during UEFA Women's Euro 2001 qualifying. On 5 August 2000, she scored twice against Belarus in a 6–1 qualifying victory in Stropkov, played in front of approximately 3,200 spectators.

In qualification for the 2003 FIFA Women's World Cup, Beregszásziová scored four goals in four appearances. On 16 August 2001, aged 21 years and 105 days, she scored four goals in a 7–0 World Cup qualifying victory over Bosnia and Herzegovina. A contemporary Bosnian report named her the player of the match, while contemporary Slovak press coverage reported that three of her goals constituted a natural hat-trick.

In 2001, Beregszásziová finished 20th in the voting for the inaugural women's FIFA World Player of the Year, becoming the first Slovak female footballer to be listed in the final standings. She was also the only Slovak representative listed in either the men's or women's final standings that year.

== Retirement ==
The results of the inaugural women´s FIFA World Player of the Year award were announced in December 2001, with Beregszásziová finishing 20th In January 2002, she was also included among the players recognized in the Slovak Women´s Team of the Year for 2001.

In March 2002, aged 21, Beregszásziová decided to end her playing career at both club and international level, without stating a specific reason. She confirmed her decision with the words: "My decision is final, it applies to both Olympia and the national team."

Despite her retirement, she was still named in Slovakia´s squad in April 2002 for the 2003 FIFA Women´s World Cup qualification matches, but she did not play against Hungary on 4 May 2002.

Her departure was widely perceived as a significant loss. Olympia Košice's coach Miroslav Pilčík stated: "Unfortunately, we are missing a scorer; with Kamila Beregszásziová's departure, we lost our attacking strength. Kamila was Kamila—opponents respected her not only in Slovakia but also abroad." Similarly, Žilina coach Ladislav Németh stated that "Beregszásziová will be hard to replace."

== International goals ==
Beregszásziová played a total of 32 matches for the senior national team and scored 18 goals, including friendly matches, which represents an average of 0.56 goals per match. In competitive matches, she scored 13 goals in 21 appearances, with an average of 0.61 goals per match.

As of the match played October 13, 2001, against Turkey.

Appearances and goals by national team and year
National team	Year	Competitive		Friendly		Total		Goals in matches
National team	Year	Matches	Goals	Matches	Goals	Matches	Goals	Goals in matches
Slovakia	1996	4	0	0	0	4	0	0
Slovakia	1997	2	1	1	0	3	1	0,3
Slovakia	1998	5	3	4	1	9	4	0,4
Slovakia	1999	1	0	0	0	1	0	0
Slovakia	2000	5	5	1	0	6	5	0,83
Slovakia	2001	4	4	5	4	9	8	0,88
Slovakia	Total	21	13	11	5	32	18	0,56

Slovakia score listed first, score column indicates score after each Kamila Beregszasziova goal.

== Matches and goals by competition ==
As of the match played October 13, 2001, against Turkey.

Matches and goals by competition
Competition	Matches	Goals
Friendlies	11	5
UEFA Euro qualification	10	5
FIFA World Cup qualification	11	8
Total	32	18

== Awards ==
=== Team honours ===
Olympia Košice

- Slovak Women's First League
  - Silver Runners-up: 1998–99, 2000–01
  - Bronze Third place: 1999–2000

=== Individual honours ===
- Slovak Women's Team of the Year: 1996 1999, 2000, 2001
- Slovak Women's First League scoring placements:
  - Second-highest scorer: 1996–97 (24 goals)
  - Second-highest scorer: 1998–99 (20 goals)
  - Third-highest scorer: 1999–2000 (18 goals)
  - Second-highest scorer: 2000–01 (20 goals)
- Slovak Championship final tournament top scorer: 4 goals

=== Individual International Award ===
- FIFA World Player of the Year award in 2001 - 20th place in the final voting, becoming the first Slovak female footballer to appear in the final standings.

== Complete chronology of appearances and goals for the national team – Slovakia ==
=== History of appearances and goals in the national team ===
Match date	City	Domestic	Result	Hosts	Match type	Goals	Notes
14.08.1996	Kauniainen	Finland	2:1	Slovakia	UEFA Women's Euro 1997 qualifying	–	debut
31.08.1996	Levice	Slovakia	0:4	Norway	UEFA Women's Euro 1997 qualifying	–	
07.09.1996	Aalst	Belgium	3:1	Slovakia	UEFA Women's Euro 1997 qualifying	–	
28.09.1996	Michalovce	Slovakia	1:2	Belgium	UEFA Women's Euro 1997 qualifying	–	
31.03.1997	Novi Sad	Yugoslavia (Socialist Federal Republic of Yugoslavia)	1:2	Slovakia	Friendly	–	
07.05.1997	Štúrovo	Slovakia	2:1	(Czech Republic) Czech	Friendly		called up for a match
26.06.1997	Dubnica	Slovakia	1:0	Belarus	Women's Harvest cup		called up for a match
27.06.1997	Trenčín	Slovakia	0:2	(Socialist Federal Republic of Yugoslavia) Yugoslavia	Women's Harvest cup		called up for a match
29.06.1997	Trebatice	Slovakia	0:2	Ukraine	Women's Harvest cup		called up for a match
02.09.1997	Šaľa	Slovakia	11:0	(Bosnia and Herzegovina) Bosnia	FIFA Women's World Cup 1999 qualification	1	
13.09.1997	Câmpina	Romania	1:1	Slovakia	FIFA Women's World Cup 1999 qualification	–	
05.10.1997	Neulengbach	Austria	0:2	Slovakia	Friendly		called up for a match
22.10.1997	Trenčín	Slovakia	4:0	Hungary	FIFA Women's World Cup 1999 qualification		called up for a match
01.04.1998	Bat-Yam	Israel	0:4	Slovakia	FIFA Women's World Cup 1999 qualification	2	
26.04.1998	Žiar nad Hronom	Slovakia	1:1	Romania	FIFA Women's World Cup 1999 qualification	–	
01.05.1998	Hrasnica (Ilidža)	Bosnia (Bosnia and Herzegovina)	0:7	Slovakia	FIFA Women's World Cup 1999 qualification	1	
13.05.1998	Prešov	Slovakia	5:0	Israel	FIFA Women's World Cup 1999 qualification	–	
03.06.1998	Bük	Hungary	3:0	Slovakia	FIFA Women's World Cup 1999 qualification	–	
29.07.1998	Trenčín	Slovakia	2:2	Israel	Women's Harvest cup	–	
30.07.1998	Dubnica	Turkey	0:4	Slovakia	Women's Harvest cup	1	
01.08.1998	Púchov	Slovakia	0:2	Austria	Women's Harvest cup	–	
29.08.1998	Brezová	Slovakia	0:2	Switzerland	Friendly	–	
04.09.1999	Kuressaare	Estonia	0:4	Slovakia	UEFA Women's Euro 2001 qualifying		called up for a match
07.10.1999	Molodechno	Belarus	1:0	Slovakia	UEFA Women's Euro 2001 qualifying		player sitting on the bench
16.11.1999	Bat-Yam	Israel	0:5	Slovakia	UEFA Women's Euro 2001 qualifying	–	
25.04.2000	Nitra	Slovakia	4:0	Israel	UEFA Women's Euro 2001 qualifying	2	
18.05.2000	Campina	Romania	4:1	Slovakia	UEFA Women's Euro 2001 qualifying	–	(yellow card) 24'
15.06.2000	Myjava	Slovakia	0:3	Romania	UEFA Women's Euro 2001 qualifying	–	
05.08.2000	Stropkov	Slovakia	6:1	Belarus	UEFA Women's Euro 2001 qualifying	2	
29.08.2000	Žiar nad Hronom	Slovakia	3:1	Estonia	UEFA Women's Euro 2001 qualifying	1	
27.09.2000	Grado	Italy	2:1	Slovakia	Friendly	–	
14.04.2001	Dekani	Slovenia	0:8	Slovakia	Friendly	2	
15.04.2001	Dekani	Slovenia	1:4	Slovakia	Friendly	2	
26.04.2001	Subotica	Yugoslavia (Socialist Federal Republic of Yugoslavia)	0:0	Slovakia	Friendly	–	
29.04.2001	Subotica	Yugoslavia (Socialist Federal Republic of Yugoslavia)	2:2	Slovakia	Friendly	–	
27.07.2001	Zakopane	Poland	0:0	Slovakia	Friendly	–	
16.08.2001	Zavidovici	Bosnia (Bosnia and Herzegovina)	0:7	Slovakia	FIFA Women's World Cup 2003 qualification	4	
08.09.2001	Mogilev	Belarus	3:2	Slovakia	FIFA Women's World Cup 2003 qualification	–	
29.09.2001	Žiar nad Hronom	Slovakia	0:2	Hungary	FIFA Women's World Cup 2003 qualification	–	
13.10.2001	Istanbul	Turkey	0:3	Slovakia	FIFA Women's World Cup 2003 qualification	–	
Total		Maches	32		Goals	18	
