= 2001 FIFA World Player of the Year =

Association football award

The 2001 FIFA World Player of the Year award was won by Luís Figo by the slim margin of 12 points. David Beckham was again in the second place. The gala was hosted at the TV Production Centre in Zürich, on December 17, 2001. 130 national team coaches, based on the current FIFA Men's World Ranking were chosen to vote. For the first time the Women's award was given out, won by Mia Hamm.

== Results ==
=== Men ===
Rank	Player	5P	3P	1P	Points	Club(s)
1	(Portugal) Luís Figo	27	35	10	250	(Spain) Real Madrid
2	(England) David Beckham	30	23	19	238	(England) Manchester United
3	(Spain) Raúl	10	12	10	96	(Spain) Real Madrid
4	(France) Zinedine Zidane	12	9	7	94	(Italy) Juventus (Spain) Real Madrid
5	(Brazil) Rivaldo	11	7	16	92	(Spain) Barcelona
6	(Argentina) Juan Sebastián Verón	9	6	8	71	(Italy) Lazio (England) Manchester United
7	(Germany) Oliver Kahn	8	5	10	65	(Germany) Bayern Munich
8	(England) Michael Owen	4	11	8	61	(England) Liverpool
9	(Ukraine) Andriy Shevchenko	6	4	4	46	(Italy) Milan
10	(Italy) Francesco Totti	5	4	3	40	(Italy) Roma
11	(France) Thierry Henry	0	3	6	15	(England) Arsenal
12	(Portugal) Manuel Rui Costa	2	1	1	14	(Italy) Fiorentina (Italy) Milan
13	(France) Patrick Vieira	2	1	0	13	(England) Arsenal
14	(Sweden) Henrik Larsson	1	1	1	9	(Scotland) Celtic
15	(Brazil) Roberto Carlos	1	1	0	8	(Spain) Real Madrid
	(Argentina) Gabriel Batistuta	0	2	2	8	(Italy) Roma
17	(Germany) Stefan Effenberg	1	0	0	5	(Germany) Bayern Munich
	(Croatia) Alen Bokšić	1	0	0	5	(England) Middlesbrough
19	(Argentina) Hernán Crespo	0	1	1	4	(Italy) Lazio
	(Netherlands) Ruud van Nistelrooy	0	1	1	4	(Netherlands) PSV (England) Manchester United
	(Italy) Alessandro Del Piero	0	0	4	4	(Italy) Juventus
22	(Colombia) Oscar Córdoba	0	1	0	3	(Argentina) Boca Juniors
	(Spain) Gaizka Mendieta	0	1	0	3	(Spain) Valencia (Italy) Lazio
	(Denmark) Ebbe Sand	0	1	0	3	(Germany) Schalke 04
	(Italy) Alessandro Nesta	0	0	3	3	(Italy) Lazio
	(Argentina) Javier Saviola	0	0	3	3	(Argentina) River Plate (Spain) Barcelona
27	(Brazil) Giovane Élber	0	0	2	2	(Germany) Bayern Munich
	(Japan) Hidetoshi Nakata	0	0	2	2	(Italy) Roma (Italy) Parma
29	Carlos Alberto	0	0	1	1	
	(Iran) Ali Daei	0	0	1	1	(Germany) Hertha Berlin
	(Spain) Luis Enrique	0	0	1	1	(Spain) Barcelona
	(England) Steven Gerrard	0	0	1	1	(England) Liverpool
	(Republic of Ireland) Roy Keane	0	0	1	1	(England) Manchester United
	(Poland) Emmanuel Olisadebe	0	0	1	1	(Poland) Polonia Warsaw (Greece) Panathinaikos
	(Argentina) Diego Simeone	0	0	1	1	(Italy) Lazio
	(Denmark) Jon Dahl Tomasson	0	0	1	1	(Netherlands) Feyenoord
	(South Africa) Sibusiso Zuma	0	0	1	1	(Denmark) F.C. Copenhagen

=== Women ===
Rank	Player	Club	Points
1	(United States) Mia Hamm	(United States) Washington Freedom	154
2	(China) Sun Wen	(United States) Atlanta Beat	79
3	(United States) Tiffeny Milbrett	(United States) New York Power	47
4	(Germany) Birgit Prinz	(Germany) FFC Frankfurt	40
5	(Germany) Doris Fitschen	(Germany) FFC Frankfurt (United States) Philadelphia Charge	37
6	(Brazil) Sissi	(United States) San Jose CyberRays	35
7	(Sweden) Hanna Ljungberg	(Sweden) Umeå IK	29
8	(Germany) Bettina Wiegmann	(Germany) FFC Brauweiler (United States) Boston Breakers	17
9	(Norway) Hege Riise	(United States) Carolina Courage	16
10	(Norway) Dagny Mellgren	(United States) Boston Breakers	13
11	(United States) Brandi Chastain	(United States) San Jose CyberRays	11
12	(Germany) Claudia Müller	(Germany) WSV Wendschott	10
13	(Canada) Charmaine Hooper	(United States) Atlanta Beat	9
14	(Germany) Sandra Smisek	(Germany) FCR Duisburg	8
	(Germany) Maren Meinert	(United States) Boston Breakers	8
	(China) Liu Ailing	(United States) Philadelphia Charge	8
17	(China) Liu Ying	China	6
	(England) Kelly Smith	(United States) Philadelphia Charge	6
	(Germany) Steffi Jones	(Germany) 1. FFC Frankfurt	6
20	(Australia) Anissa Tann	(Australia) NSW Sapphires	5
	(Vietnam) Nguen Thi Mai Lan	(Vietnam) Dong Trieu	5
	(United States) Cindy Parlow	(United States) Atlanta Beat	5
	(Sweden) Malin Moström	(Sweden) Umeå IK	5
	(Slovakia) Kamila Beregszasziova	(Slovakia) Olympia Košice	5
	(Brazil) Kátia	(United States) San Jose CyberRays	5
26	(United States) Kristine Lilly	(United States) Boston Breakers	4
	(United States) Joy Fawcett	(United States) San Diego Spirit	4
	(United States) Michelle Akers	United States	4
29	(Norway) Gro Espeseth	(United States) New York Power	3
	(United States) Julie Foudy	(United States) San Diego Spirit	3
	(United States) LaKeysia Beene	(United States) San Jose CyberRays	3
	(Norway) Bente Nordby	(United States) Carolina Courage (United States) San Diego Spirit	3
	(Brazil) Mônica Angélica de Paula	Brazil	3
	(Sweden) Jane Tornqvist	(Sweden) Älvsjö AIK FF	3
	(Brazil) Pretinha	(United States) Washington Freedom	3
	(China) Mar Lar Win	China	3
	(France) Corinne Diacre	(France) Soyaux	3
	(United States) Briana Scurry	(United States) Atlanta Beat	3
	(China) Zhu Jing	China	3
	(Turkey) Hatice Bahar Özgüvenç	(Turkey) Delta Mobilyaspor (Turkey) Kuzeyspor	3
	(Denmark) Merete Pedersen	(Denmark) Odense Boldklub Q	3
	(France) Marinette Pichon	(France) Saint-Memmie Olympique	3
43	(Mexico) Maribel Dominguez	Mexico	2
44	(Norway) Ann Kristin Aarones	(United States) New York Power	1
	(England) Angela Banks	(England) Arsenal W.F.C.	1
	(Brazil) Roseli	(United States) Washington Freedom	1
	(Denmark) Carol Bonde	Denmark	1
	(China) Han Wenxia	China	1
	(China) So Wing	China	1
	(China) Bai Jie	(United States) Washington Freedom	1
	(Guinea) Mama ama Gyaneua	(Guinea) Guyana	1
	(Australia) Julie Murray	(United States) Bay Area CyberRays	1
	(Guatemala) Magnolia Perez	(Guatemala) Comunicaciones	1
	(Italy) Patrizia Panico	(Italy) Lazio	1
	(Norway) Marianne Pettersen	(England) Fulham Ladies	1
	(China) Wen Lirong	(United States) Carolina Courage (United States) San Diego Spirit	1
	(Brazil) Tania	(Brazil) AA. Santa Izabel (Brazil) Grêmio	1
	(United States) Carola Andersson	(United States) Tiffin University	1
	(Nigeria) Mercy Akide	(United States) San Diego Spirit	1
	(Belgium) Cynthia Browaeys	(Belgium) Eendracht Alost Ladies	1
	(Russia) Nadezhda Bosikova	(Russia) FC Energy Voronezh	1
