= Anastasia Fedotova =

Russian athlete

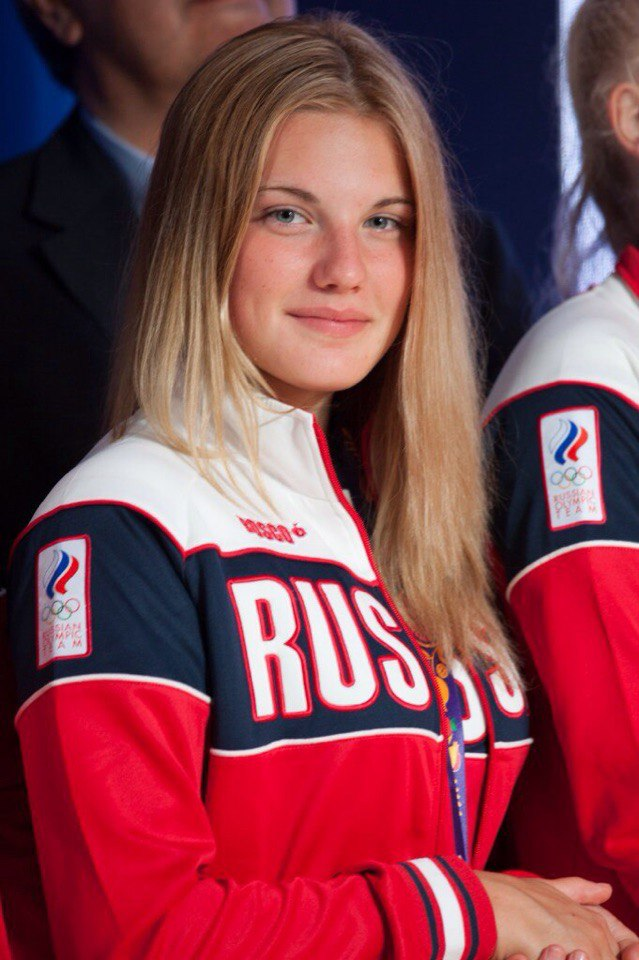

Personal information
- Full name: Anastasia Aleksandrovna Fedotova
- Nationality: Russia
- Born: November 30, 1998 (age 27) Moscow, Russia
- Height: 1.75 m (5 ft 9 in)

Sport
- Sport: Water polo
- Position: Driver
- Current club: Spartak Volgograd
Medal record
European Championships
Silver medal – second place	2020 Budapest
European Games
Gold medal – first place	2015 Baku	Team

Anastasia Aleksandrovna Fedotova (Russian: Анастасия Александровна Федотова; born 30 November 1998) is a Russian water polo player. She competed in the 2020 Summer Olympics as alternate.
