= Györgyi Sebestyén =

Hungarian footballer

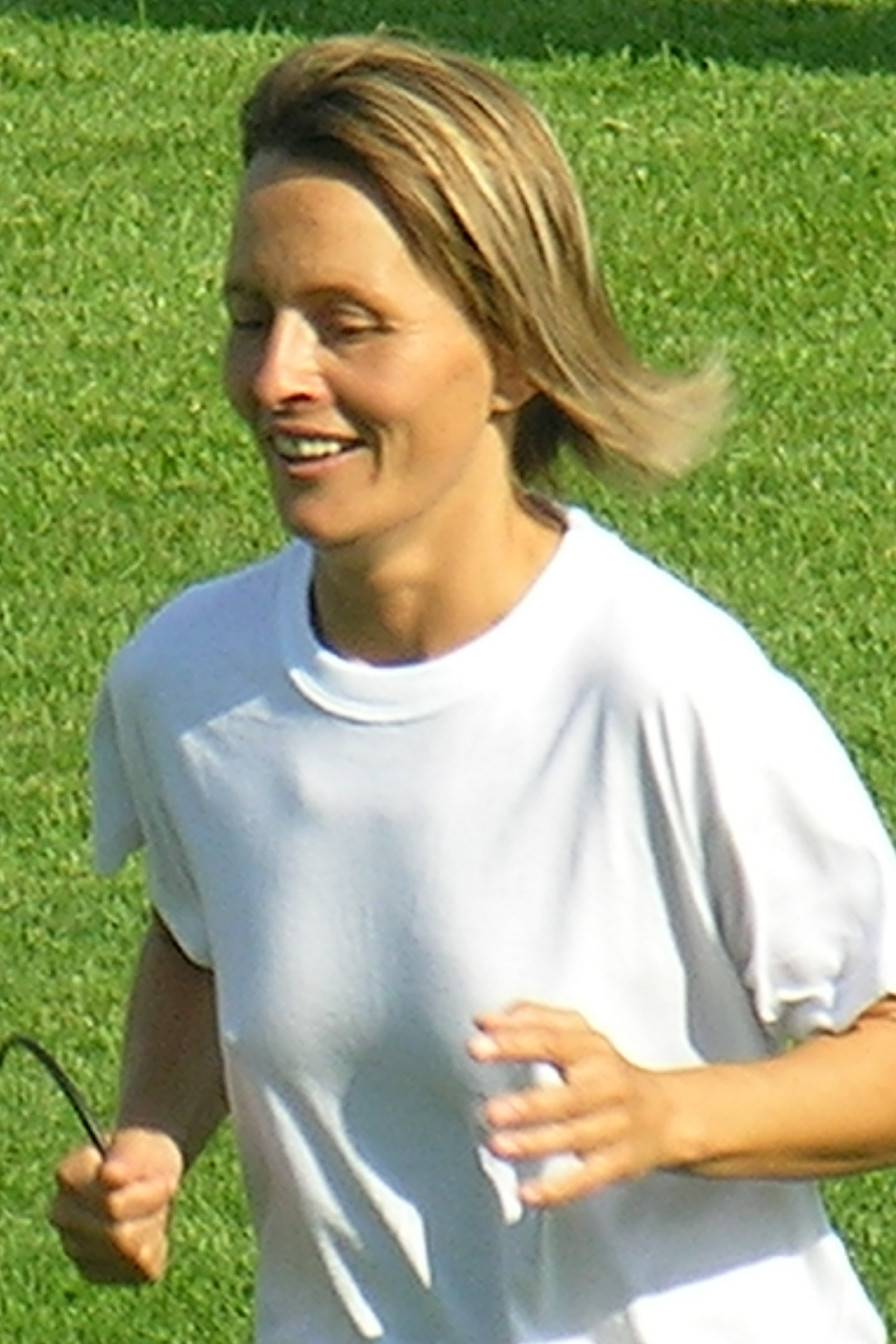

Personal information
- Full name: Györgyi Sebestyén
- Date of birth: 27 November 1974 (age 51)
- Place of birth: Szekszárd, Hungary

Senior career*
Years	Team	Apps	(Gls)
?–2009	Femina		
2009–2011	Taksony SE		
2011–2012	Astra		

International career
1995–2007	Hungary	63	(8)
- * Club domestic league appearances and goals

Györgyi Sebestyén (born 27 November 1974 in Szekszárd) is a Hungarian former football midfielder. She previously played most notably for 1.FC Femina and Astra Hungary FC.

Named Hungarian Footballer of the Year in 1996, she was a member of the Hungarian national team for more than a decade.

== Titles ==
- 8 Hungarian Leagues (1996, 1997, 2001, 2002, 2003, 2006, 2007, 2008)
- 1 Hungarian Cup (1996)
