= Hrasnica, Ilidža =

Hrasnica
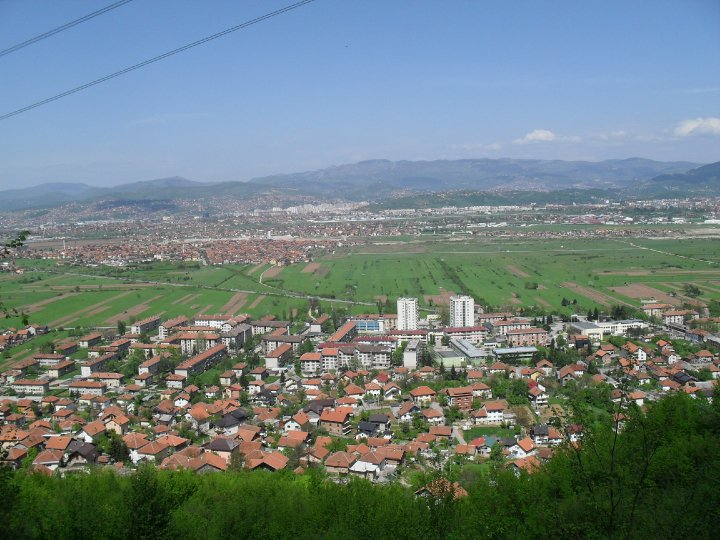
- Panorama of Hrasnica

- Location within Bosnia and Herzegovina
- Coordinates: 43°47′48″N 18°18′45″E
- Country: Bosnia and Herzegovina
- Entity: Federation of Bosnia and Herzegovina
- Canton: Sarajevo
- Municipality: Ilidža
- Elevation: 551 m (1,808 ft)

Population (1991)
  - Total: 12,437

Hrasnica is an urban neighborhood located in the municipality of Ilidža, Sarajevo Canton of the Federation of Bosnia and Herzegovina, an entity of Bosnia and Herzegovina. According to the 1991 Yugoslav census, it had a population of 12,437 inhabitants, divided in two administrative areas, Hrasnica 1 and Hrasnica 2.

== See also ==
- List of cities in Bosnia and Herzegovina
- Municipalities of Bosnia and Herzegovina
