= Exiles S.C. =

Exiles
- Founded: 1967; 59 years ago
- League: Maltese Waterpolo Premier League
- Based in: Sliema
- Arena: Exiles, Sliema
- Colors
- President: Andrew Paris
- Website: http://www.exiles.com.mt/

Exiles Sports Club is a Maltese waterpolo team (it also has a swimming team), currently playing in the top tier Maltese Waterpolo Premier League. The club was founded in 1967 and hails from Sliema. The team is currently known as Exiles Elia Caterers for sponsorship reasons.

The Exiles Club is situated beneath one of the De Redin towers; this is portrayed on the club's crest.

The club is named after the Exiles Beach, of which the name is unclear: either after a mispronunciation of a Customs and Excise Office that was once stationed on the bay, or after the Russian exiles who settled in the area after the Bolshevik Revolution. Before the club was built, a hut stood in the location, which acted as the seat of the Malta Eastern Club, which was an exclusive club for Cable & Wireless St. Julian's branch employees, taking the name from the Eastern Telegraph Company.

The club celebrated its 50-year anniversary in 2017.

The club operates a Beach Lido.

== Current squad ==
Squad as at June 30, 2018:

- (Malta) Simon Apap
- (Malta) Andrea Bianchi
- (Malta) Matthew Castillo
- (Malta) Gianni Ciappara
- (France) Aurélien Cousin
- (Malta) Luca Felice
- (Malta) Mark Fenech
- (Malta) Kurt Griscti
- (Malta) Benji Lanzon
- (Serbia) Slobodan Nikić
- (Malta) Michael Paris
- (Malta) Nicky Paris
- (Malta) Philip Paris
- (Malta) Michele Stellini
- (Malta) Timmy Sullivan
- (Malta) Sean Xerri de Caro
- (Malta) Christian von Brockdorff

== Honours ==
Competition	Titles	Seasons
Summer League First Division	10	1977, 1980, 1982, 1987, 1989, 2000, 2002, 2006, 2008, 2009
Summer KO First Division	11	1975, 1977, 1979, 1982, 1984, 1991, 2002, 2003, 2004, 2008, 2024
Winter League First Division	2	2024, 2025
Premier Promotion Cup	2	2025, 2026
