= Elisavet Protopapas =

Greek water polo player

Personal information
- Nationality: Greek
- Born: 23 July 1999 (age 27)
- Height: 1.69 m (5 ft 7 in)
- Weight: 62 kg (137 lb)

Sport
- Sport: Water polo
- Handedness: Left
- Position: Field player
- Current club: California Golden Bears

Senior clubs
- Years: Team
- California Golden Bears
National team
- Years: Team
- Greece
Medal record
Representing Greece
European Championships
| Silver medal – second place | 2018 Barcelona | Team |
European Games
| Bronze medal – third place | 2015 Baku | Team |

Elisavet Protopapas (born 23 July 1999) is a Greek water polo player for California Golden Bears and the Greece women's national water polo team.

She participated at the 2018 Women's European Water Polo Championship.
