= Olympia Košice =

- Full name: Olympia Košice
- Founded: 1992; 34 years ago
- Dissolved: 2002
- Chairman: Juraj Kolesár
- Coach: Miroslav Pilčík, Martin Benko
- League: Slovak Women's First League
Home colours	Away colours

Olympia Košice, better known as Olympia, was a Slovak women's football club from Košice. It played in the Slovak 1st Women's League from 1992 to 2002. The club's achievements include two-time vice-champion of Slovakia (1999 and 2001) and 3rd place (2000).

Olympia was founded in 1992. In 2002 it merged with Spartak Košice, creating TJ Lokomotíva Košice.

== Achievements of TJ Olympia Košice ==
=== Slovak Women's First League ===
Season	League	Position	Top Scorer Olympia (Goals)
1992/93	1. league	10. place	
1993/94	1. league	9. place	Juhásová (2),Andrejčáková (2)
1994/95	1. league	5. place	Marcela Gregová (7)
1995/96	1. league	6. place	Kamila Beregszasziova (13)
1996/97	1. league	4. place	Kamila Beregszasziova (24)
1997/98	1. league	8. place	
1998/99	1. league	.place	Kamila Beregszasziova (20)
1999/00	1. league	.place	Kamila Beregszasziova (18)
2000/01	1. league	.place	Kamila Beregszasziova (20)
2001/02	1. league	4. place	Marcela Ižová (34)

== List of Slovak women's national team players from 1995 to 2002 ==
This list contains international players who have played at least one match for the Slovak national team, including friendly matches.

Representative Slovakia	Period	Debut – Opponent	Place	Match type	Matches	Goals	Notes	Medals won in the 1st league
Marcela Gregová	1995–1996	3 May 1995 Switzerland	Košice	Friendly	10	–	–	–
Erika Benešová	1995	11 October 1995 Finland	Bardejov	ME´97 qual.	2	–	also represented Czechoslovakia	Silver medal
Kamila Beregszasziova	1996–2001	14 August 1996 Finland	Kauniainen	ME´97 qual.	32	18	–	Silver medal Silver medal Bronze medal
Zuzana Jeleneková	1997	31 March 1997 (Socialist Federal Republic of Yugoslavia) Yugoslavia	Novy Sad	Friendly	4	–	–	Silver medal Silver medal Bronze medal
Eva Petrovová	1998–2000	13 May 1998 Israel	Prešov	MS´99 qual.	9	–	–	Silver medal Silver medal Bronze medal
Marcela Ižová	1998–2002	29 July 1998 Israel	Trenčín	Slovakia Cup 1998– Harvest Cup	21	3	–	Silver medal Silver medal Bronze medal

== History ==
Football enthusiasts Marek Jakab and Miroslav Pilčík, who in 1992 decided to put women's football on its feet in our city when they founded ŠK Olympia Košice through joint efforts. They signed up with their charges for the highest competition in Slovakia, first among the 10–12 sections of the Women's Football League. On their own initiative, they sought funds to maintain the activities of the club, then when the women's football headquarters decided that each participant in the highest competition must have a girls' student team in the competition. In 10 years, they achieved success in the years 1999/2000, 2000/2001 and 2001/2002, when they placed second twice and once in third place in the competition. There were also successes abroad.
