= List of Turkey women's international footballers =

This is a list of Turkey women's international footballers – women's football players, who have played for the Turkey women's national football team.

== Key to positions ==
GK	Goalkeeper
DF	Defender
MF	Midfielder
FW	Forward
Bold	Still playing competitive football

== List of players ==
As of 9 June 2026

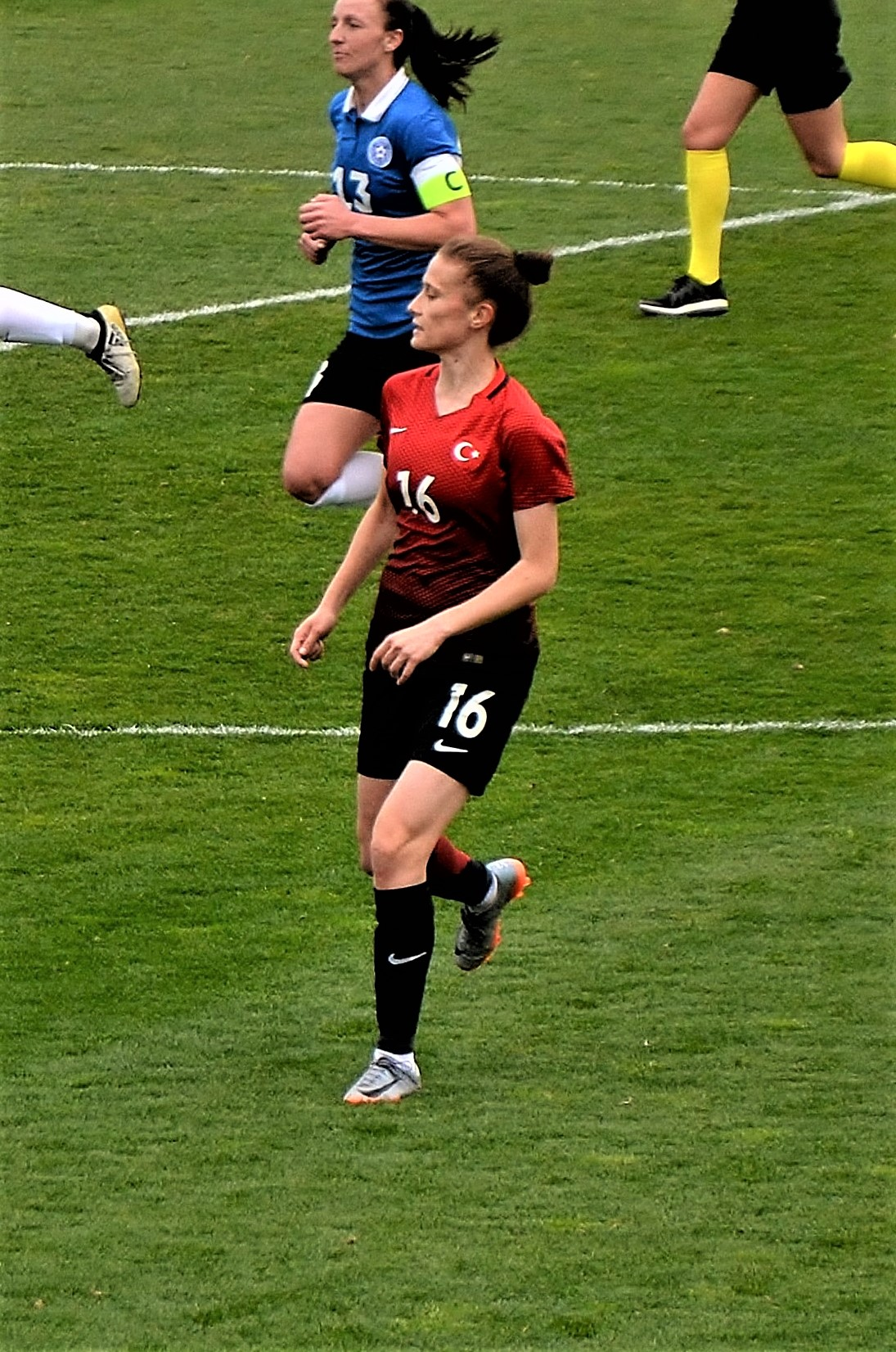
Ebru Topçu made 99 appearances for Turkey

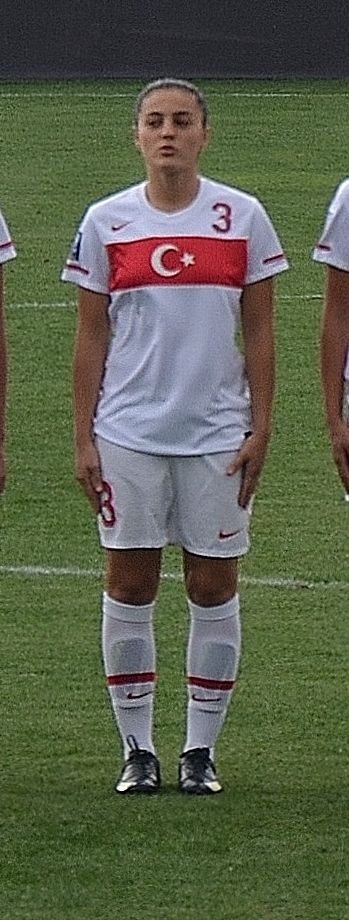
Didem Karagenç made 74 appearances for Turkey

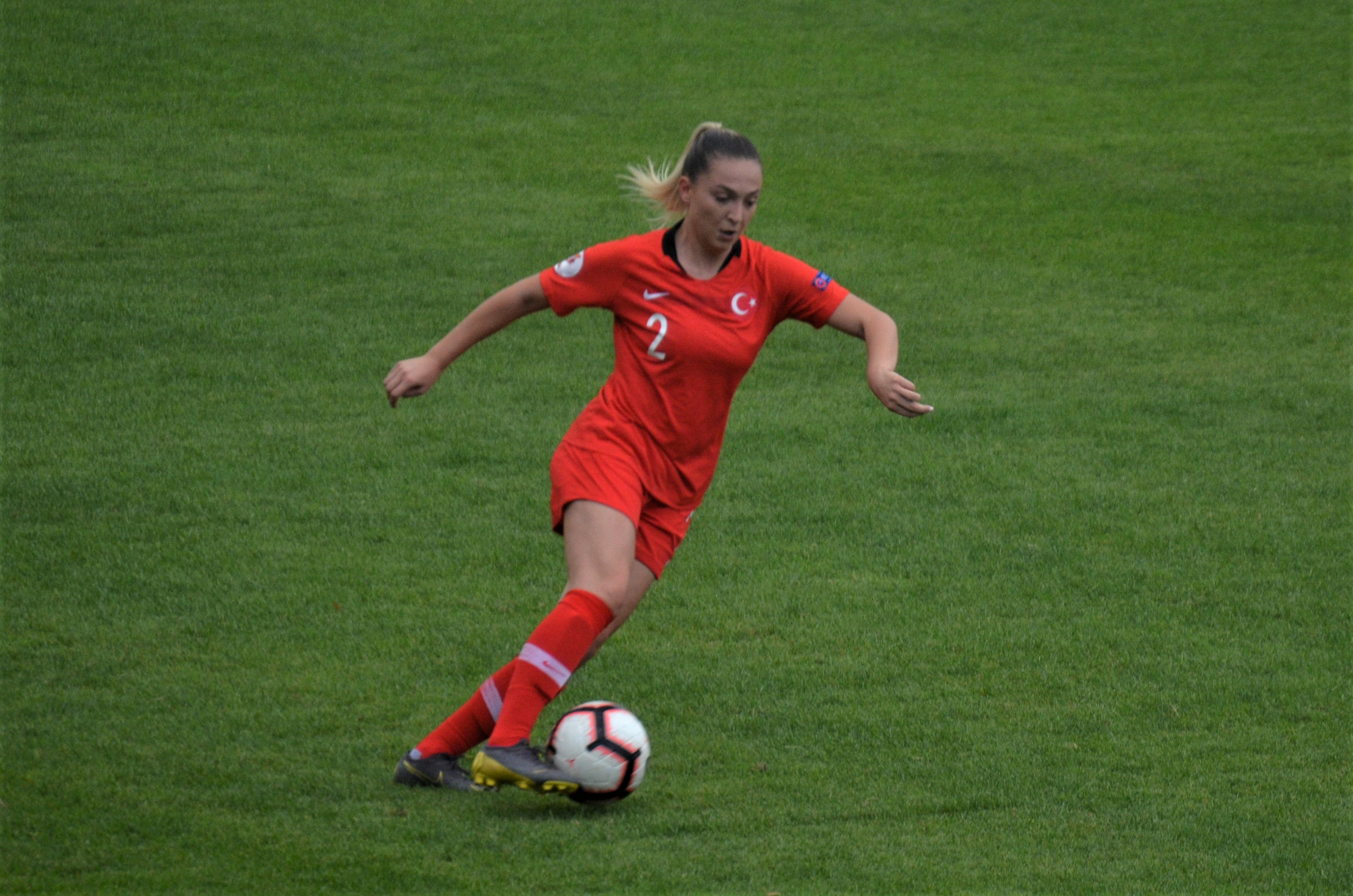
Berna Yeniçeri made 44 appearances for Turkey

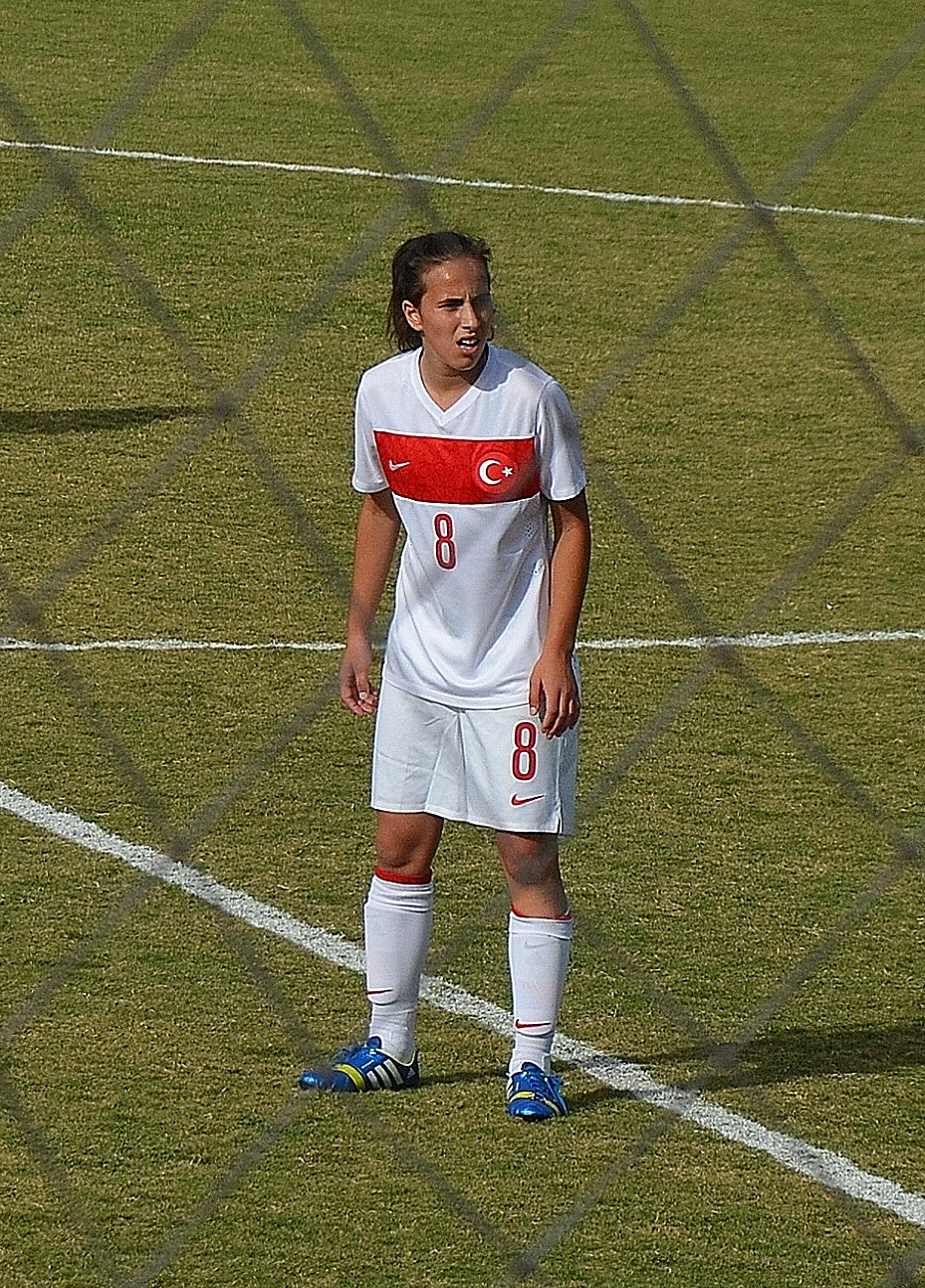
Birgül Sadıkoğlu made 41 appearances for Turkey

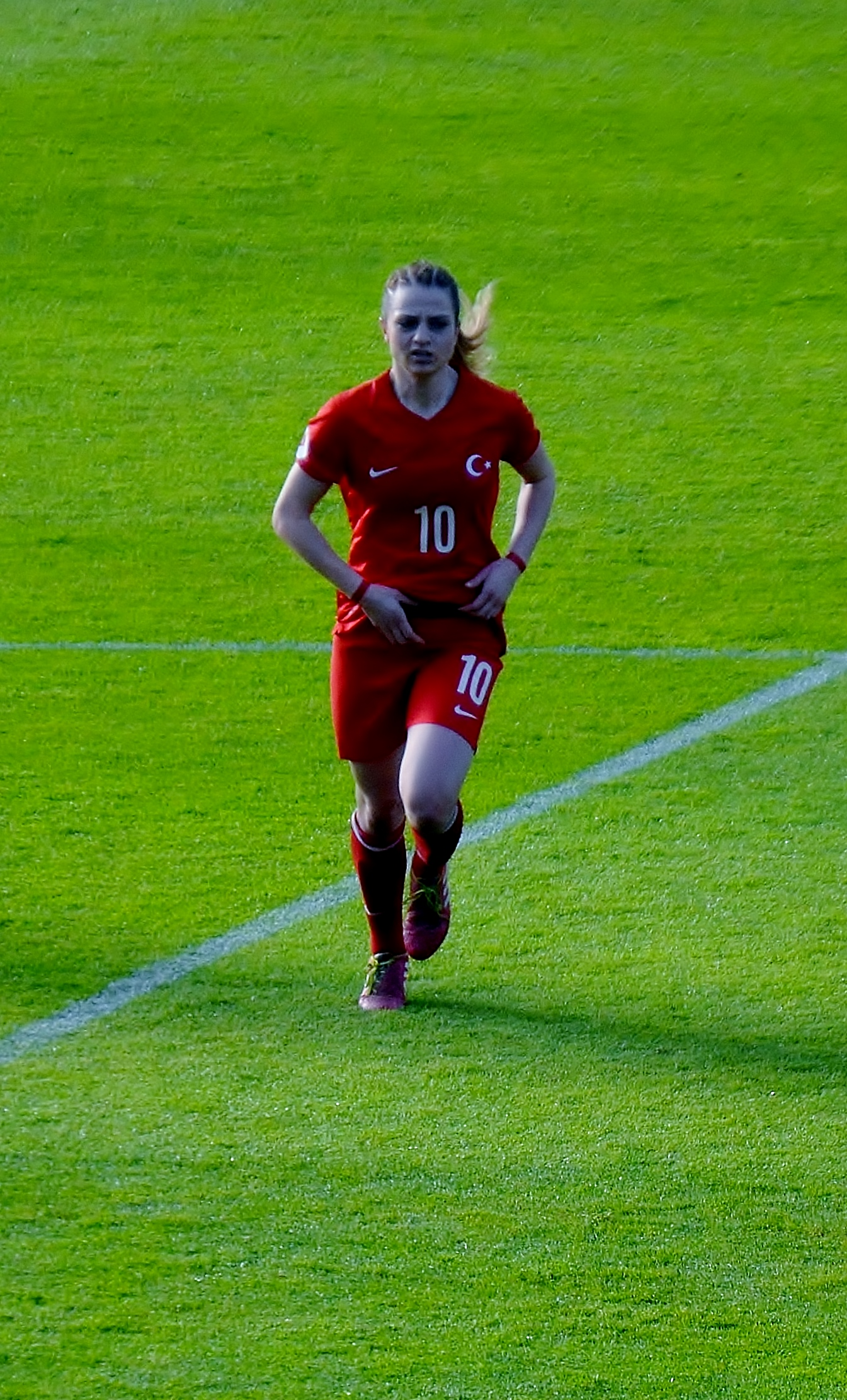
Melike Pekel made 40 appearances for Turkey

Name	Position	Years	Caps	Goals	Ref.
**Ebru Topçu**	MF	2013–	100	25	
**Didem Karagenç**	DF	2010–	74	3	
Yağmur Uraz	FW	2006–2024	67	28	
**Selda Akgöz**	GK	2015–	62	0	
**Arzu Karabulut**	MF	2011–	61	7	
**Ece Türkoğlu**	MF	2016–	57	12	
**Gülbin Hız**	FW	2011–	56	5	
Esra Erol	DF	2001–2020	55	8	
**Busem Şeker**	MF	2017–	53	8	
**İlayda Civelek**	MF	2020–	52	2	
Bilgin Defterli	FW	1999–2014	52	16	
**Elif Keskin**	MF	2020–	51	5	
Çiğdem Belci	DF	2006–2020	48	0	
Fatma Kara	MF	2009–2020	45	5	
**Berna Yeniçeri**	DF	2014–	44	0	
**Miray Cin**	MF	2021–	42	3	
**Melike Pekel**	FW	2015–	41	10	
**Birgül Sadıkoğlu**	MF	2019–	41	8	
İpek Kaya	DF	2015–2022	41	0	
**Kader Hançar**	FW	2018–	40	11	
**Emine Ecem Esen**	MF	2013–	40	2	
Melahat Eryurt	FW	1995–2002	39	18	
**Eda Karataş**	DF	2012–	38	0	
Cansu Yağ	MF	2006–2016	37	4	
Ayfer Topluoğlu	GK	1995–2001	31	0	
Seyhan Gündüz	FW	1997–2002	30	12	
Ayşe Kuru	DF	1995–2001	30	0	
Feride Akgün	FW	1996–2002	29	2	
Reyhan Yüksekoğlu	MF	1997–2002	29	2	
Sevgi Çınar	MF	2013–2020	27	3	
Esmeray Demirci	DF	1996–2000	26	2	
Seval Kıraç	MF	2006–2014	25	3	
Eylül Tekten	FW	2007–2014	25	2	
**Kezban Tağ**	DF	2019–	24	1	
**Meryem Cennet Çal**	MF	2023–	24	1	
Meral Halıcı		1995–2001	24	0	
Fatma Şahin	GK	2009–2021	24	0	
**Derya Arhan**	DF	2018–	22	3	
Reyhan Şeker	MF	2006–2012	21	10	
**Ecem Cumert**	MF	2017–	21	2	
Çağla Korkmaz	MF	2015–2018	21	1	
**Büşra Kuru**	MF	2020–	21	1	
Alev Paçal		1995–1999	21	0	
Duygu Yılmaz	GK	2006–2022	21	0	
**Selen Altunkulak**	MF	2017–	20	11	
Yeliz Demir	DF	2001–2011	20	0	
**Melike Öztürk**	FW	2020–	19	0	
Necmiye Çakır		1996–1999	19	0	
Ümran Özev	DF	2022–2024	19	0	
Hasret Altındere		1998–2002	18	3	
Lütfiye Ercimen	DF	2006–2010	18	1	
İlknur İdin		1995–1998	17	0	
Sevgi Özder		1997–2002	17	0	
Sibel Cımbız		1998–2002	17	0	
Nihan Su	DF	1999–2002	17	0	
**Ece Tekmen**	MF	2021–	16	0	
**Gamze Nur Yaman**	GK	2018–	16	0	
Zerrin Bakır		1999–2002	16	2	
Başak Ersoy	MF	2008–2012	16	1	
**Sejde Abrahamsson**	DF	2024–	16	1	
Ayfer Sayın	GK	1995–2002	16	0	
Medine Erkan	DF	2016–2021	16	0	
Leyla Güngör	DF	2010–2013	15	2	
Ezgi Çağlar	GK	2014–2022	15	0	
Gülcan Koca	DF	2010–2012	14	0	
Ebru Uzungüney	MF	2017–2019	14	0	
Handan Demircan		1997–2000	13	2	
Necla Akdoğan		1995–1998	13	0	
Kezban Gülşen Eşkil		2007–2010	13	0	
Feride Bakır	DF	2009–2011	13	0	
Fatma Işık	DF	2017–2019	13	0	
**Cansu Nur Kaya**	MF	2020–	12	0	
Sibel Duman	DF	2011–2014	12	1	
Yeşim Demirel	FW	2011–2017	12	0	
Gizem Gönültaş	MF	2016–2020	12	0	
Hatice Bahar Özgüvenç	FW	2001–2007	10	4	
Helga Nadire İnan Ertürk	MF	2008–2010	10	2	
Döndü Aldırmaz		1997–2001	10	1	
Meryem Özyumşak	GK	2000–2010	10	0	
Yaşam Göksu	DF	2014–2021	10	0	
**Fatma Şakar**	DF	2024–	9	0	
Selin Dişli	MF	2018–2019	9	1	
Ayşegül Yılmaz		1995–1996	9	0	
Yasemin Metin		1996–1999	9	0	
Hava Öztürk		1997–2002	9	0	
Ayşe Gürbüz	DF	2006–2010	9	0	
Mevlüde Öztürk	MF	2007–2009	9	0	
Başak Gündoğdu	FW	2016–2019	9	0	
**Halle Houssein**	MF	2024–	8	0	
Burcu Düner	MF	2007–2010	8	2	
Arzu Ulusan		1999–2002	8	0	
Gamze İskeçeli	FW	2001–2013	8	0	
Melis Özçiğdem	MF	2001–2006	8	0	
Neslihan Demircioğlu		2001–2002	8	0	
Elif Deniz	MF	2011–2015	8	0	
Esra Sibel Tezkan	DF	2015–2017	8	0	
Aylin Yaren	MF	2008–2015	7	3	
Tuncay Kılıç		1996–2001	7	2	
Nazan Bulut		1995–1996	7	1	
Melek Turan		1997–1998	7	0	
Zübeyde Kaya	DF	2010–2013	7	0	
Sevinç Çorlu	DF	2014–2015	7	0	
Serra Çağan	DF	2015–2017	7	0	
Nurhan Çakmak	FW	1999–2000	6	4	
Çiğdem Kayhan		1995–1996	6	0	
Melek Olşen		1995–1996	6	0	
Nurcan Çelik	GK	1999–2008	6	0	
Seda Tosun		1999–2000	6	0	
Çiğdem Mor		2000–2001	6	0	
Bahar Güvenç	DF	2016–2017	6	0	
**Zeynep Kerimoğlu**	FW	2022–	6	0	
**Başak İçinözbebek**	MF	2025–	6	0	
**Meryem Küçükbirinci**	MF	2025–	6	0	
Ebru Gelirli		2008	5	2	
**Benan Altıntaş**	FW	2021–	5	1	
Sevda Duman		1996–1997	5	0	
Şenay Özgül		1996	5	0	
Filiz Koç	MF	2009–2015	5	0	
Şeyma Erenli	MF	2010–2012	5	0	
Ceren Nurlu	FW	2011–2016	5	0	
Dilara Türk	MF	2015	5	0	
**Vildan Kardeşler**	DF	2026–	4	0	
Shirley Kocaçınar	FW	2011	4	2	
Nurgül Güneş		1995–1996	4	0	
Huriye Aslı Ertunç		1996	4	0	
Mihrican Ocaktan		2000–2001	4	0	
Arzu Usçetin		2002	4	0	
Melisa Ertürk	MF	2010–2012	4	0	
Leyla Bağcı	GK	2011–2012	4	0	
Merve Aladağ	FW	2011–2012	4	0	
Songül Ece Altınöz	DF	2012–2013	4	0	
Pınar Yalçın	FW	2013–2014	4	0	
Hanife Demiryol	MF	2014–2015	4	0	
Emine Demir	DF	2015–2016	4	0	
Büsra Barut	MF	2019	4	0	
Meral Öz		1998–1999	3	1	
Dilan Yeşim Taşkın	DF	2020–2021	3	1	
Emine Yılmaz		1995	3	0	
Eray Mutlu		1995–1996	3	0	
Deniz Özer	MF	2009–2011	13	0	
Rüya Uçmaz		1995	3	0	
Tuğba Çepniler		1998–1999	3	0	
Nesrin Turgutlu		1999	3	0	
Ana Rosca		2002	3	0	
Fatma Özkan	DF	2006	3	0	
Perihan Sarak		2006	3	0	
Nagehan Akşan	DF	2009	3	0	
Damla Demirdön	MF	2012	3	0	
Didem Taş	DF	2013–2014	3	0	
Emine Gümüş	FW	2014	3	0	
Dilan Ağgül	MF	2018–2019	3	0	
Fatoş Yıldırım	DF	2020–2021	3	0	
Dilara Soley Deli	DF	2023	3	0	
Çilem Yaşar		1995	2	0	
Yelda Hoşgör		1997–1999	2	0	
Handan Akça		1998	2	0	
Nilay Yiğit		1998	2	0	
Reşan Gençel		1998	2	0	
Sema Yorulmaz		1998	2	0	
Filiz Yurt		1999–2002	2	0	
Rabia İştüzün		1999–2001	2	0	
Selma İzitaş	GK	2001–2002	2	0	
Gülcan Akköprü		2002	2	0	
Nesrin Çevik		2002	2	0	
Hatice Şaşma		2006	2	0	
Deniz Kocakaya	FW	2010	2	0	
Deniz Nadia Özer	MF	2011	2	0	
Gökçem Elmira Can	GK	2011	2	0	
Büşra Ahlatcı	MF	2012	2	0	
Filiz İşikırık	FW	2012	2	0	
Banu Gürcüoğlu		2015	2	0	
Aytül Dilek Okur		2017	2	0	
Handan Kurğa	GK	2017–2022	2	0	
Sevgi Salmanlı	FW	2017	2	0	
**Berivan İçen**	MF	2020–	2	0	
Beyza Kara	FW	2020–2022	2	0	
Neslihan Demirdögen	FW	2023	2	0	
**Narin Yakut**	DF	2023–	2	0	
**İlayda Cansu Kara**	DF	2025–	2	0	
Arzu Sema Canbul		1995	1	0	
Gözlem Güzelyıldız		1995	1	0	
Selindağ Yuluğ		1995	1	0	
Firdes Kaplan		1996	1	0	
Melda Gündüz		1996	1	0	
Özlem Başyurt		1996	1	0	
Filiz Anlı		1998	1	0	
Arzu Otlu	GK	1999	1	0	
Emel Albayoğlu		1999	1	0	
Funda Özcan		1999	1	0	
Gönül Erbay		1999	1	0	
Gazel Güven		2000	1	0	
Derya Çakar		2001	1	0	
Elif Çepni		2001	1	0	
Fatma Esra Göçmen		2001	1	0	
Tuğba Öztürk		2001	1	0	
Serap Taşgın		2002	1	0	
Özlem Önder		2006	1	0	
Cansu Topçu		2007	1	0	
Pelinay Tohumcu		2008	1	0	
Esra Biçer Külekçi		2010	1	0	
Leyla Kanbir		2010	1	0	
Şekibe Esebalı	DF	2011	1	0	
Hilal Başkol	MF	2015	1	0	
Safa Merve Nalçacı	DF	2016	1	0	
Bilgesu Aydın	GK	2017	1	0	
Şebnem Taşkan	MF	2017	1	0	
Aycan Yanaç	FW	2018	1	0	
Dilara Özlem Sucuoğlu	DF	2018	1	0	
Pakize Gözde Dökel	MF	2018	1	0	
Şevval Alpavut	DF	2018	1	0	
Bedriye Cam	GK	2019	1	0	
Jessica O'Rourke	DF	2020	1	0	
Beyza Kocatürk	DF	2021	1	0	
Kevser Gündoğdu	GK	2021–	1	0	
Cansu Gürel	DF	2022–	1	0	
Ferda İpek Çevik	DF	2022	1	0	
Seda Nur İncik	MF	2022	1	0	
Sümeyra Kıvanç	MF	2022	1	0	
Tuğba Karataş	MF	2022	1	0	
**Rojin Polat**	MF	2023–	1	0	
**Göknur Güleryüz**	GK	2023–	1	0	
