= Özlem =

- Gender: Female

Origin
- Language: Turkish
- Meaning: "Yearning"

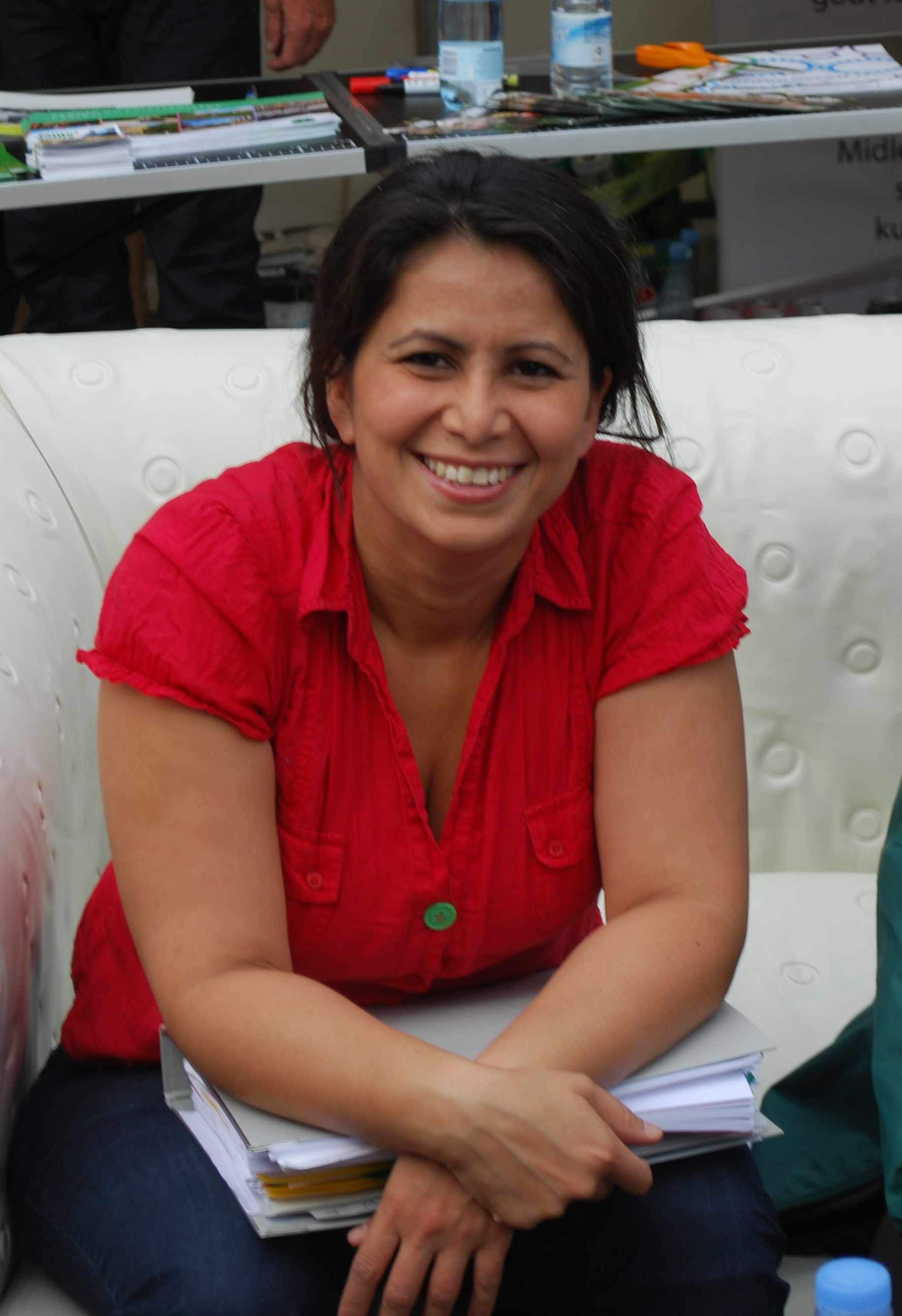
Özlem Sara Çekiç

Özlem is a common feminine Turkish given name. In Turkish, "Özlem" means yearning and missing.

== Given name ==
- Asiye-Özlem Sahin (born 1976), Turkish-German professional boxer
- Dilara Özlem Sucuoğlu (born 1998), Turkish-German footballer
- Fatma Özlem Tursun (born 1988), Turkish female football referee and former women's footballer
- Ozlem Altin (born 1977), German-Turkish visual artist
- Özlem Araç (born 1989), Turkish football manager and former women's football player
- Ozlem Ayduk, Turkish-American professor of psychology
- Özlem Başyurt (born 1971), Turkish basketball coach and teacher, former footballer and basketball player
- Özlem Becerek (born 2002), Turkish discus thrower
- Özlem Becerikli (born 1980), Turkish bronze medalist Paralympian powerlifter
- Özlem Ceren Dursun (born 2003), Turkish cross-country skier
- Özlem Çarıkçıoğlu (born 1994), Turkish Olympian alpine skier
- Özlem Çekiç (born 1976), Danish politician of Turkish origin
- Özlem Conker (born 1973), Turkish actress
- Özlem Denizmen, Turkish businesswoman
- Özlem Demirel (born 1984), Turkish-German politician of Kurdish origin
- Özlem Kaya (athlete) (born 1990), Turkish middle distance runner
- Özlem Kaya (swimmer) (born 1992), Turkish Para swimmer
- Özlem Kolat (born 1984), Turkish clarinetist
- Özlem Özçelik (born 1972), Turkish volleyball player
- Özlem Özgül Dündar (born 1983), Turkish-German poet, essayist, translator, and novelist.
- Özlem Tekin (born 1971), Turkish singer
- Özlem Türeci, Turkish-German scientist, co-founder of Biontech
- Özlem Türköne (born 1976), Turkish columnist and politician
- Özlem Yalman (born 1977), Turkish basketball referee
- Özlem Yasemin Taşkın (born 1985), retired Turkish swimmer
- Özlem Yıldız (born 2003), Turkish judoka
- Özlem Zengin (born 1969), Turkish lawyer

== Surname ==
- Yılmaz Özlem (born 1972), Turkish footballer
