= Damla (name) =

- Gender: Female
- Language: Turkish

Origin
- Meaning: "drop (of water or rain)"

Damla is a feminine Turkish name. In Turkish, "Damla" means "drop" (of water or rain).

== Name ==
- Damla Colbay (born 1993), Turkish actress
- Damla Çakıroğlu (born 1994), Turkish volleyball player
- Damla Demirdön (born 1990), Turkish football player
- Damla Deniz Düz (born 1995), Turkish water polo player
- Damla Demirdön (born 1990), Turkish footballer
- Damla Günay (born 1982), Turkish archer
- Damla Köse (born 2000), Turkish sport shooter
- Damla Pelit (born 2001), Turkish karateka
- İrem Damla Şahin (born 2000), Turkish women's footballer
- Damla Su Türemen (born 2004), Turkish karateka
- Damla Sönmez (born 1987), Turkish actress
- Damla Şentürk, Turkish-American biostatistician and professor
- Damla Mohibullah, Afghan Taliban politician and military figure, purportedly of Uzbek origin
