= Shabnam (disambiguation) =

Shabnam is the stage name for Jharna Basak (born 1946), a Bangladeshi–Pakistani stage and film actress.

Shabnam may also refer to:

== Films ==
- Shabnam (1949 film), a Hindi film by Bibhuti Mitra
- Shabnam (1964 film), a Hindi film starring Mehmood
- Shabnam (1993 film), a Hindi film starring Krishan Kumar
- Shabnam, character portrayed by Madhubala in the 1960 Indian film Barsaat Ki Raat
- Shabnam, character portrayed by Gitikka Ganju Dhar in the 2025 Indian film Dhurandhar
- Shabnam Masood, fictional character from EastEnders

== People with the name ==
- Shabnam K. Ghazi (born 1971), Iranian-born Canadian artist
- Shabnam Mausi, Indian politician
- Shabnam Nasimi (born 1991), British Afghani social activist & writer
- Shabnam Paryani, contestant in the UK TV reality competition series Big Brother 8
- Shabnam Shiwan, Fijian designer
- Shabnam Surayyo (born 1981), Tajik singer
- Shabnam Tolouei (born 1971), Iranian actress

== See also ==
- Şebnem, Turkish variant of the female given name Shabnam
