= Bilgesu =

Bilgesu is a feminine given name of Turkish origin. Notable people with the name include:

== Given name ==
- Bilgesu Aydın (born 1994), Turkish footballer
- Bilgesu Erenus (1943–2026), Turkish playwright, screenwriter, and activist
