= Şentürk =

Şentürk is a Turkish surname. Notable people with the surname include:

- Arif Şentürk (1941–2022), Turkish singer of Macedonian descent
- Damla Şentürk, Turkish-American biostatistician
- Erhan Şentürk (born 1989), Turkish footballer
- Kemalettin Şentürk (born 1970), retired Turkish footballer
- Metin Şentürk (born 1966), Turkish blind pop singer
- Semih Şentürk (born 1983), Turkish footballer
