= Damla =

Damla may refer to:

- Damla (name), Turkish given name
- Damla, Haryana, village in Yamunanagar district, Haryana, India
- Damla, Araç, village in Araç District, Kastamonu Province, Turkey
- Damla, Haryana, location of Krishi Vigyan Kendra, Damla agricultural centre in Haryana, India
- Damla (brand), a Coca-Cola brand
- Fatma Damla Altın (born 2002), Turkish Paralympian athlete
