= Shiwan =

Shiwan could refer to:

== Places ==
Shíwān (石湾) could refer to the following locations in China:

- Shiwan Subdistrict, Huazhou, Guangdong
- Shiwanzhen Subdistrict (石湾镇街道), or Shiwan Town, Foshan, Guangdong
- Shiwan, Boluo County, Guangdong
- Shiwan, Hepu County, in Hepu County, Guangxi
- Shiwan, Hengdong (石湾镇), a town of Hengdong County, Hunan.
- Shiwan, Hengshan County, Shaanxi, in Hengshan County, Shaanxi

== People ==
- Shabnam Shiwan, Fijian designer based in New Zealand
