= Taşkan =

Taşkan is a surname. Notable people with the surname include:

- İdris Nebi Taşkan (born 1997), Turkish actor and basketball player
- Şebnem Taşkan (born 1994), Turkish-German footballer

== See also ==
- Taskan
