= Şebnem =

Şebnem also spelled as Shebnem is a Turkish name (from Persian: شبنم Shabnam) meaning dew.

It is very popular in Iran, Afghanistan, India, Pakistan, Turkey, and Azerbaijan. Notable people with the name include:

- Simge Şebnem Aköz (born 1999), Turkish volleyball player
- Şebnem Bozoklu (born 1979), Turkish actress
- Şebnem Dönmez (born 1974), Turkish actress and television host
- Şebnem Ferah (born 1972), Turkish singer and songwriter
- Sebnem Kalemli-Ozcan, American economist
- Şebnem Kimyacıoğlu (born 1983),Turkish women's basketball player
- Şebnem Korur Fincancı (born 1959), Turkish professor and medic
- Şebnem Paker (born 1977), Turkish guitarist and singer
- Jennifer Şebnem Schaefer (born 1984), Turkish-German model, actress and television presenter
- Şebnem Sönmez (born 1968), Turkish actress
- Şebnem Taşkan (born 1994), Turkish-German footballer

== See also ==
- Shabnam (disambiguation), variant spelling of the name
