= Buse Güngör =

Turkish footballer (born 1994)

Personal information
- Date of birth: October 2, 1994 (age 32)
- Place of birth: Izmit, Turkey
- Position: Attacking midfielder

Team information
- Current team: Kireçburnu Spor
- Number: 20

Senior career*
| Years | Team | Apps | (Gls) |
| 2008–2011 | Gölcükspor | 45 | (16) |
| 2011–2012 | İzmit Belediyespor | 19 | (7) |
| 2012–2013 | İzmit Çenesuyu Plajyoluspor | 6 | (9) |
| 2013–2014 | Derince Belediyespor | 19 | (2) |
| 2014–2015 | Kireçburnu Spor | 14 | (4) |
| 2016– | Kocaeli Harb-İşspor | 21 | (10) |
| Total | | 124 | (48) |

International career^{‡}
| 2010 | Turkey U-17 | 2 | (1) |
| 2010–2012 | Turkey U-19 | 11 | (1) |
- * Club domestic league appearances and goals as of April 30, 2017 ‡ National team caps and goals as of October 25, 2012

Buse Güngör (born October 2, 1994) is a Turkish women's football attacking midfielder currently playing in the Women's First League for Kireçburnu Spor with jersey number 20. She is a member of the Turkey women's national U-19 team.

== Playing career ==
=== Club ===
Buse Güngör obtained her license on June 10, 2008. She played three seasons for Gölcükspor in her hometown, the last season in the First League. She capped 45 times and scored 16 goals with Gölcükspor. In the 2011–12 season, she transferred to İzmit Belediyespor, where she appeared in 19 matches scoring 7 goals in one season. The next season, she moved to the Second-League team İzmit Çenesuyu Plajyoluspor, however she left at the end of the season's halftime for Derince Belediyespor playing again in the First League. She played two seasons with Derince Belediyespor, where she capped in 19 matches and scored 2 goals.

In the 2014–15 season, she transferred to the Istanbul-based Second League team Kireçburnu Spor due to withdrawal of her club from the league. At the end of the season, her team enjoyed promotion to the Women's First League. Her team won the play-off matches of the season, and were promoted to the Women's First League. At the second half of the 2015–16 season, Güngör joined the Third-League team Harb-İşspor. At the end of the season, she enjoyed her team's promotion to the Women's Second League.

=== International ===
Admitted to the Turkey girls' U-17 team, she played at the 2011 UEFA Women's Under-17 Championship qualification round matches and scored a goal against the Armenian girls.

Buse Güngör was called up to the Turkey women's U-19 team to appear at the 2011 UEFA Women's U-19 Championship First qualifying round and Second qualifying round matches. She played at the 2011 Kuban Spring Tournament and netted a goal against Ukraine women's U-19 team. Further, she played at the 2013 UEFA Women's U-19 Championship First qualifying round matches.

== Career statistics ==
As of match played April 30, 2017.

| Club | Season | League | | | Continental | | National | | Total | |
| Club | Season | Division | Apps | Goals | Apps | Goals | Apps | Goals | Apps | Goals |
|---|---|---|---|---|---|---|---|---|---|---|
| Gölcükspor | 2008–09 | Second League | 6 | 2 | – | – | 0 | 0 | 6 | 2 |
| Gölcükspor | 2009–10 | Second League | 18 | 6 | – | – | 0 | 0 | 18 | 6 |
| Gölcükspor | 2010–11 | First League | 21 | 8 | – | – | 10 | 2 | 31 | 10 |
| Gölcükspor | Total | | 45 | 16 | – | – | 10 | 2 | 55 | 18 |
| İzmit Belediyespor | 2011–12 | First League | 19 | 7 | – | – | 0 | 0 | 19 | 7 |
| İzmit Belediyespor | Total | | 19 | 7 | – | – | 0 | 0 | 19 | 7 |
| İzmit Çenesuyu Plajyoluspor | 2012–13 | Second League | 6 | 9 | – | – | 3 | 0 | 9 | 9 |
| İzmit Çenesuyu Plajyoluspor | Total | | 6 | 9 | – | – | 3 | 0 | 9 | 9 |
| Derince Belediyespor | 2012–13 | First League | 7 | 0 | – | – | 0 | 0 | 7 | 0 |
| Derince Belediyespor | 2013–14 | First League | 12 | 2 | – | – | 0 | 0 | 12 | 2 |
| Derince Belediyespor | Total | | 19 | 2 | - | – | 0 | 0 | 19 | 2 |
| Kireçburnu Spor | 2014–15 | Second League | 12 | 4 | – | – | 0 | 0 | 12 | 4 |
| Kireçburnu Spor | 2015–16 | First League | 2 | 0 | – | – | 0 | 0 | 2 | 0 |
| Kireçburnu Spor | Total | | 14 | 4 | - | – | 0 | 0 | 14 | 4 |
| Kocaeli Harb-İşspor | 2015–16 | Third League | 6 | 9 | – | – | 0 | 0 | 6 | 9 |
| Kocaeli Harb-İşspor | 2016–17 | Second League | 15 | 1 | – | – | 0 | 0 | 15 | 1 |
| Kocaeli Harb-İşspor | Total | | 21 | 10 | - | – | 0 | 0 | 21 | 10 |
| Career total | | | 124 | 48 | – | – | 13 | 2 | 137 | 50 |

== Honours ==
Turkish Women's First League

Derince Belediyespor (women)
Third places (1): 2013–14.

Turkish Women's Second League

Kireçburnu Spor
Runners-up (1): 2014–15, promotion to the Women's First League
