= Ezgi Çağlar =

Turkish footballer (born 1991)

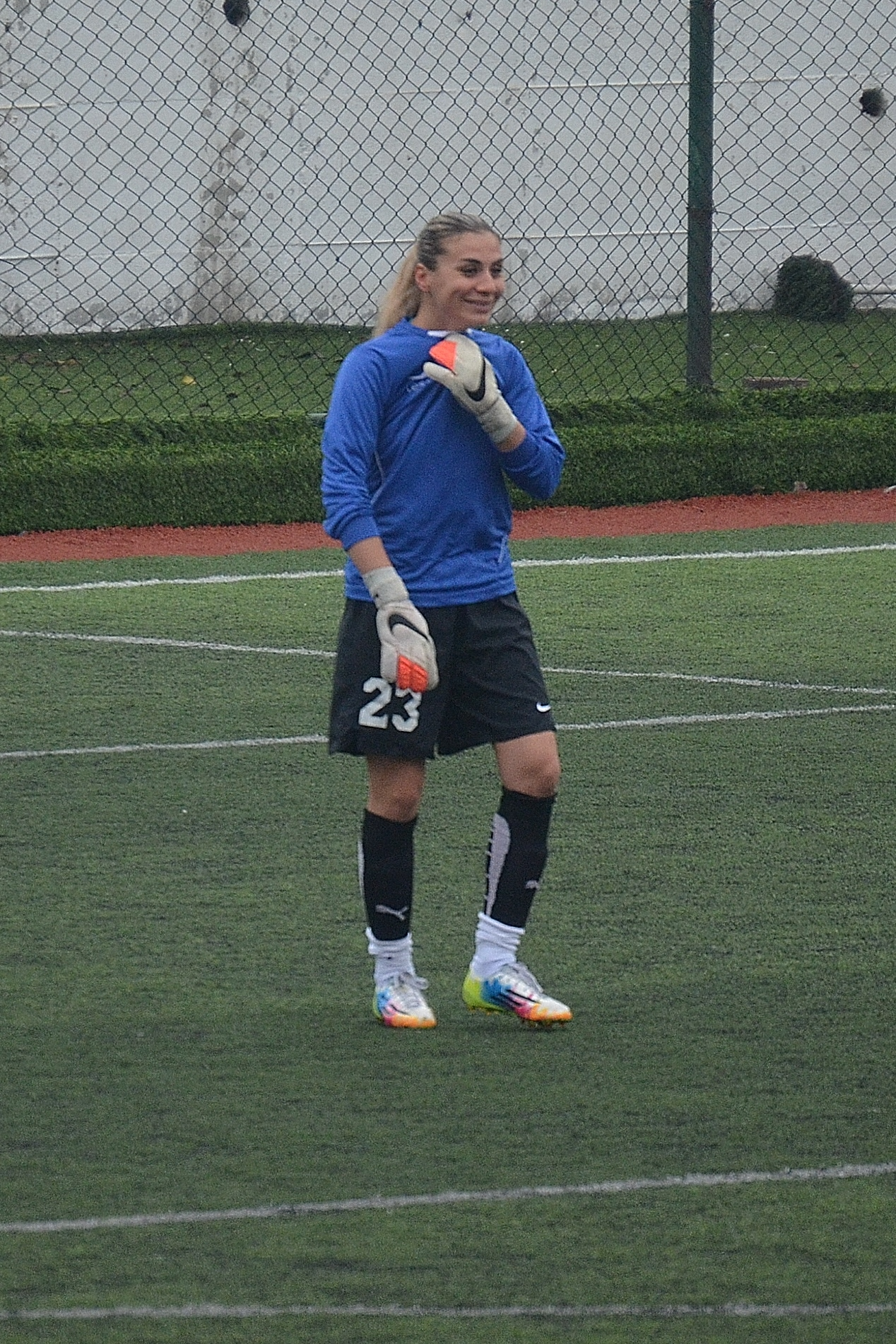
- Ezgi Çağlar (November 2014)

Personal information
- Date of birth: July 3, 1991 (age 35)
- Place of birth: Konak, İzmir, Turkey
- Height: 1.75 m (5 ft 9 in)
- Position: Goalkeeper

Team information
- Current team: Beşiktaş

Senior career*
Years	Team	Apps	(Gls)
2006–09	Bucaspor	17	(0)
2009–11	Düvenciler Lisesispor	36	(2)
2011–15	Ataşehir Belediyespor	38	(0)
2015–16	Kireçburnu Spor	18	(0)
2017	Ataşehir Belediyespor	10	(0)
2017–2018	Amed SFK	18	(0)
2018–19	Kireçburnu Spor	16	(0)
2019–20	ALG Spor	9	(0)
2020–21	Fatih Vatan Spor	6	(0)
2021–23	Fenerbahçe	34	(0)
2023–	Beşiktaş	6	(0)

International career^{‡}
2006–2007	Turkey U-17	10	(0)
2007–2010	Turkey U-19	20	(0)
2014–	Turkey	15	(0)
- * Club domestic league appearances and goals as of 24 December 2023 ‡ National team caps and goals as of 24 December 2023

Ezgi Çağlar (born July 3, 1991) is a Turkish women's football goalkeeper who plays for Beşiktaş. She was member of the Turkey women's national team.

== Playing career ==
=== Club ===
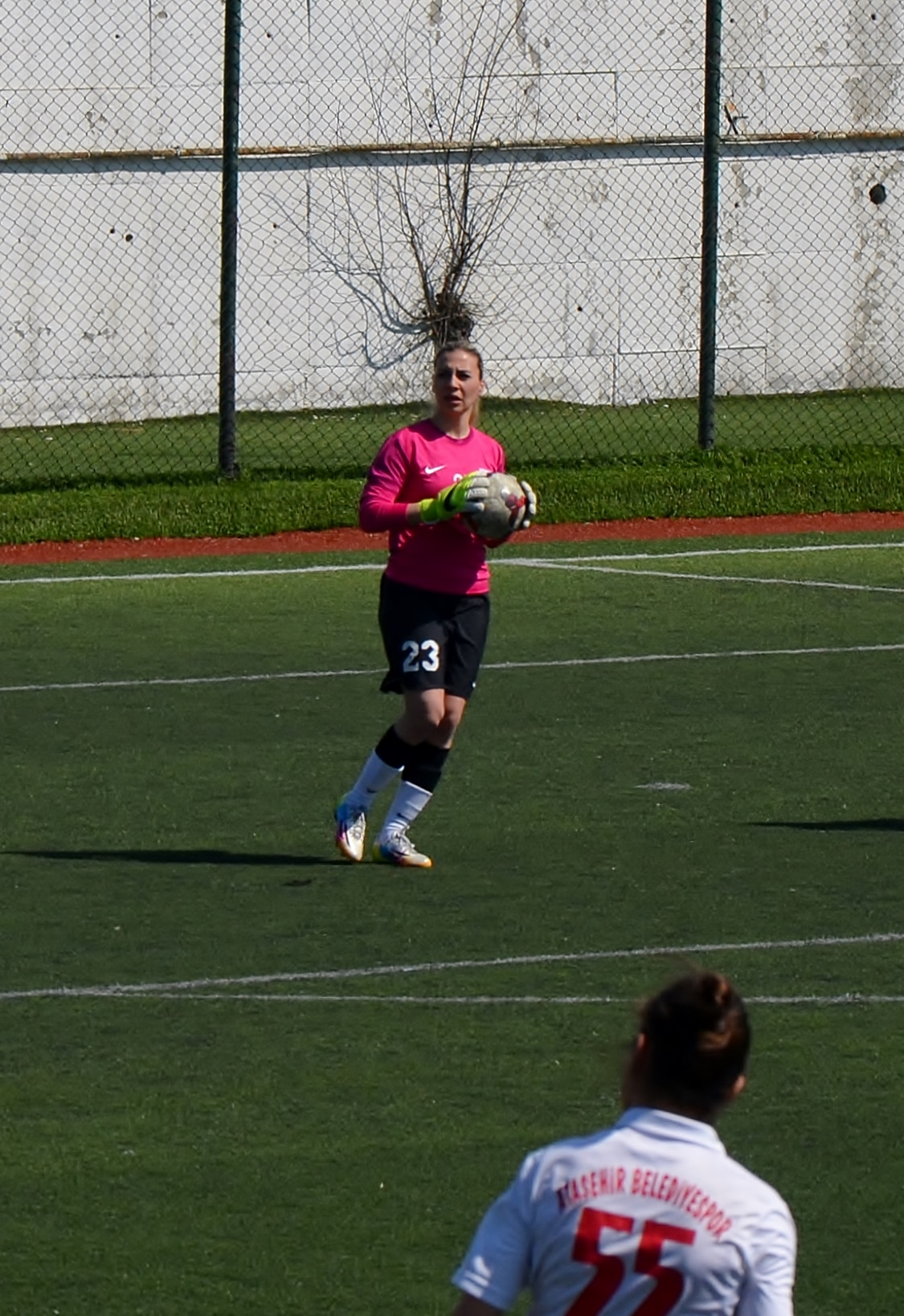
Ezgi Çağlar playing for Ataşehir Belediyespor in the 2014–15 season.

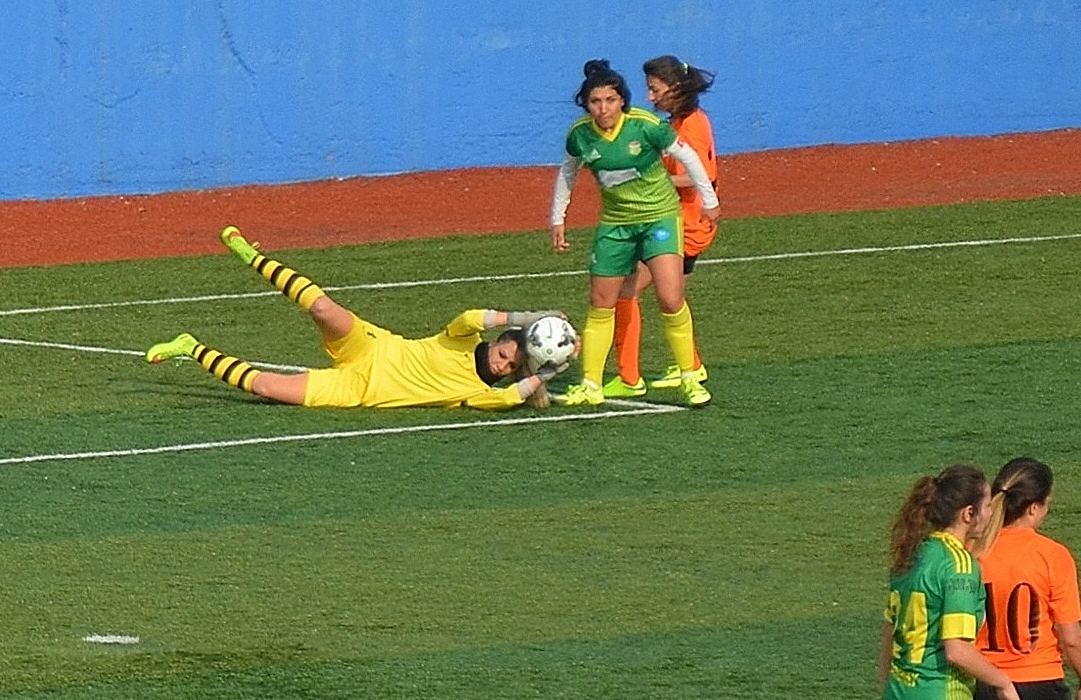
Ezgi Çağlar saving the ball for Kireçburnu Spor in the 2015–16 season.

Ezgi Çağlar began playing football at Bucaspor after obtaining her license on April 28, 2006. Three years later, she moved to the high school girls' club Düvenciler Lisesispor in Lüleburgaz for the 2009–10 season. She played two seasons there, capped 36 times and scored also two goals.

On August 5, 2011, Çağlar was transferred by the Istanbul-based club Ataşehir Belediyespor, which had become newly league champion. During the 2011–12 UEFA Women's Champions League – Group 4 matches, which started one week later of joining her new club, she had to sit on the reserve bench. At the end of the next season, she enjoyed her first championship. Çağlar debuted in the UEFA Women's Champions League on August 11, 2012, playing at the 2012–13 UEFA Women's Champions League – Group 1 match against the Lithuanian side Gintra Universitetas. She took part also in the following two matches of the tournament.

For the 2015–16 season, she signed with Kireçburnu Spor, which was recently promoted to the Women's First League. In the second half of the 2016–17 season, Çağlar returned to her former club Ataşehir Belediyespor. In October 2017, Çağlar was transferred by the Diyarbakır-based club Amed SFK, which were recently promoted to play in the 2017-18 Turkish Women's First Football League. In the 2018–19 First League season, Çağlar returned to her former club Kireçburnu Spor.

Ezgi currently plays for Beşiktaş.

=== International ===
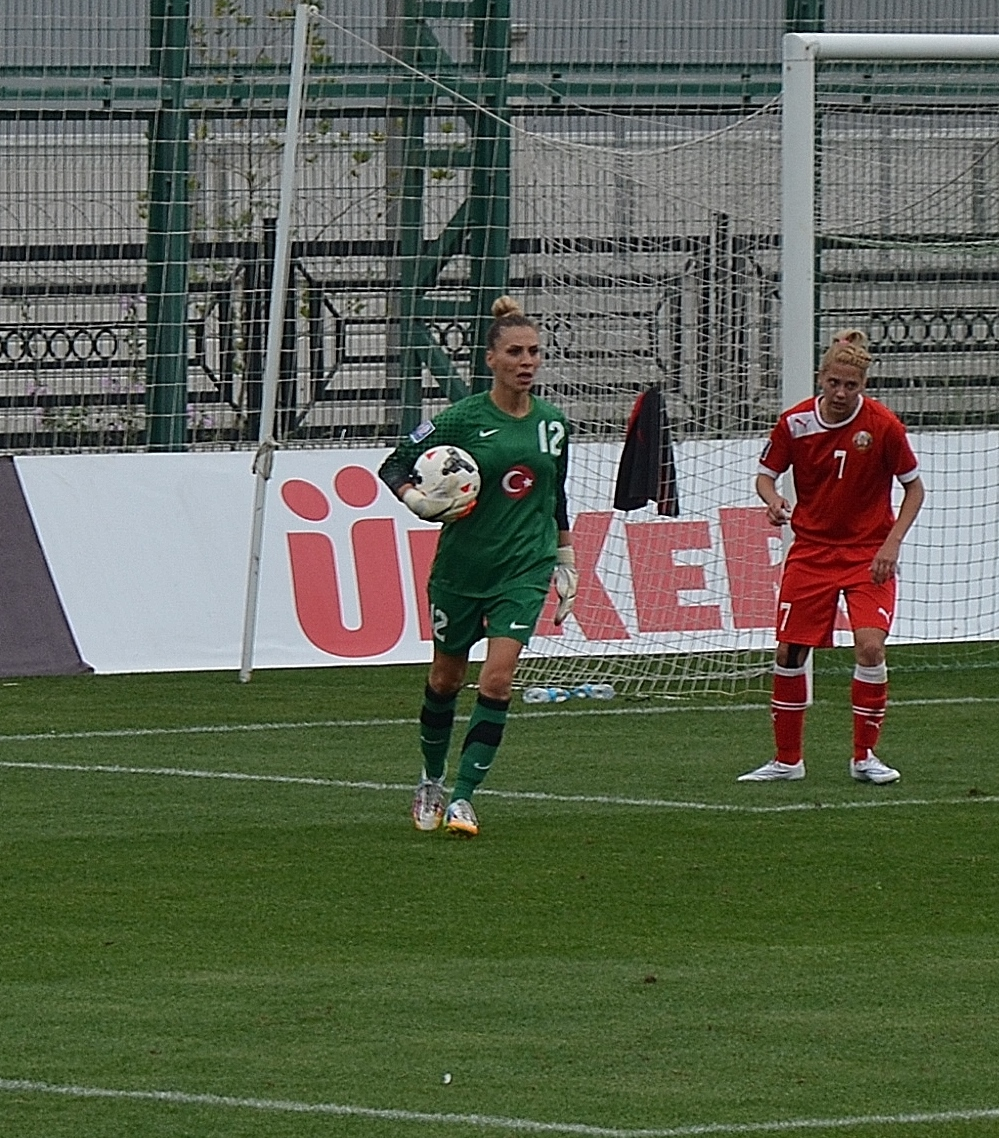
Ezgi Çağlar playing for Turkey in the 2015 FIFA Women's World Cup qualification – UEFA Group 6 home match against Belarus.

Çağlar was called up to the Turkey girls' U-17 national team to play at the 2008 UEFA Women's U-17 Championship – Group 6 matches. She debuted in the match against the Irish girls on October 19, 2007. She capped three times in total for the girls' youth nationals.

She made her first appearance in the Turkey women's U-19 national team on September 27, 2007, playing at the 2008 UEFA Women's Under-19 Championship qualifying round match against Poland. She further took part in the qualifying round matches of the 2009 UEFA Women's Under-19 Championship and the 2010 UEFA Women's Under-19 Championship. She capped 9 times for the junior women national team.

Çağlar debuted in the national team in the friendly match against Bulgaria on May 5, 2007. As of end 2013, she capped 29 times, mostly in friendly games. She is held as a reserve goalkeeper.

== Career statistics ==
As of match played December 13, 2024.

Club	Season	League			Continental		National		Total	
Club	Season	Division	Apps	Goals	Apps	Goals	Apps	Goals	Apps	Goals
Bucaspor	2006–2008	First League			–	–	17	0	17	0
Bucaspor	2008–09	First League	17	0	–	–	9	0	26	0
Bucaspor	Total		17	0	–	–	26	0	43	0
Düvenciler Lisesispor	2009–10	Second League	16	2	–	–	4	0	20	2
Düvenciler Lisesispor	2010–11	First League	20	0	–	–	0	0	20	0
Düvenciler Lisesispor	Total		36	2	–	–	4	0	40	2
Ataşehir Belediyespor	2011–12	First League	6	0	–	–	0	0	6	0
Ataşehir Belediyespor	2012–13	First League	8	0	3	0	0	0	11	0
Ataşehir Belediyespor	2013–14	First League	9	0	–	–	4	0	13	0
Ataşehir Belediyespor	2014–15	First League	15	0	–	–	3	0	18	0
Ataşehir Belediyespor	Total		38	0	3	0	7	0	48	0
Kireçburnu Spor	2015–16	First League	12	0	–	–	6	0	18	0
Kireçburnu Spor	2016–17	First League	6	0	–	–	0	0	6	0
Kireçburnu Spor	Total		18	0	–	–	6	0	24	0
Ataşehir Belediyespor	2016–17	First League	10	0	–	–	0	0	10	0
Ataşehir Belediyespor	Total		10	0	–	–	0	0	10	0
Amed SFK	2017–18	First League	18	0	–	–	0	0	18	0
Amed SFK	Total		18	0	–	–	0	0	18	0
Kireçburnu Spor	2018–19	First League	16	0	–	–	0	0	16	0
Kireçburnu Spor	Total		16	0	–	–	0	0	16	0
ALG Spor	2019–20	First League	8	0	–	–	0	0	8	0
ALG Spor	Total		8	0	–	–	0	0	8	0
Fatih Vatan Spor	2020–21	First League	6	0	–	–	0	0	6	0
Fatih Vatan Spor	Total		6	0	–	–	0	0	6	0
Fenerbahçe	2021–22	Super League	19	0	–	–	1	0	20	0
Fenerbahçe	2022–23	Super League	11	0	–	–	0	0	11	0
Fenerbahçe	Total		30	0	–	–	1	0	31	0
Beşiktaş	2023–24	Super League	19	0	–	–	0	0	19	0
Beşiktaş	2024–25	Super League	7	0	–	–	0	0	7	0
Beşiktaş	Total		26	0	–	–	0	0	26	0
Career total			223	2	3	0	44	0	267	2

== Honours ==
Turkish Women's First League

Bucaspor
Runners-up (2): 2007–08, 2008–09

Ataşehir Belediyespor
Winners (1): 2011–12
Runners-up (3): 2012–13, 2013–14, 2014–15

Fatih Vatan Spor
Runners-up (1): 2020–21

Turkish Women's Second League

Düvenciler Lisesispor
Winners (1): 2009–10
