= Özlem Kolat =

Turkish classical clarinet player (born 1984)

- Born: 15 June 1984 (age 41); Edirne, Turkey
- Origin: Keşan, Edirne, Turkey
- Genres: Classical Music
- Occupations: Performer, Composer
- Years active: 1995 – present
- Label: Ametist Clarinet Quintette

Özlem Kolat (born 15 June 1984 in Edirne) is a Turkish classical clarinet player.

== Education ==
Özlem Kolat started clarinet training at the State Conservatory of Trakya University in 1995 under the guidance of Oktay Bağırov. She was awarded the 2nd prize in the International Young Musician of the Year contest in 1998, and the 3rd prize in 2000, organized by Edirne Rotary Club. After completing her secondary and high school education, she was admitted in 2001 as a clarinetist to the Istanbul University State Conservatory. She attended workshops with Covent Garden Royal Opera House soloists.

Kolat graduated from Istanbul University State Conservatory in 2005. She was admitted to Guy Deplus' class at the École Normale de Musique de Paris, in 2006. She was awarded an Execution Diploma after one year with the École Normale de Musique de Paris.

== Performances ==
She took part in the 7th Eskişehir International Music Festival and the 1st Afyokarahisar Music Festival with Uzel Ametist Clarinet Quintette, of which she has been a member for six years, and gave concerts and seminars within the framework of those organizations.

In 2002, she participated in the 30th International Istanbul Music Festival, the 2nd Afyonkarahisar Music Festival, and gave some concerts in Pakistan in Karachi and Islamabad.

She has given many concerts:

- In 2003 at İzmir Sanat,
- in 2004 in Slovenia (Ljubljana and Velenje) and the 32nd International Istanbul Music Festival,
- in 2005 in Japan (Tama-Tokyo) Clarinet Festival 2005, in the 33rd International Music Festival, in Turgut Reis International Classical Music Festival and in the 4th Afyonkarahisar Music Festival,
- in 2006 in Latvia (Riga), Lithuania (Vilnius and Šiauliai) and Estonia (Tallinn) in the 16th Akbank Jazz Fastival, and especially at AKM, İs Sanat, CRR and Milli Reasürans.

Özlem Kolat continues to work with the Ametist Clarinet Quintette.
