= Bucaspor Ladies Football Team =

Bucaspor
- Full name: Buca Spor Kulübü Bayan Futbol Takımı
- Nickname: Dişi Fırtınalar (The Female Storms)
- Founded: 2005
- Ground: Seyit Mehmet Özkan Facility, Buca, İzmir Province, Turkey
- Coordinates: 38°20′39″N 27°13′20″E
- Chairman: Şeref Üstündağ
- Manager: (Turkey) Ömer Elbirlik
- League: Premier League
- 2008–09: 2nd
Home colours	Away colours

Bucaspor Ladies Football Team (Turkish: Bucaspor Bayan Futbol Takımı) is the women's football team of Bucaspor in Buca, İzmir, Turkey.

Established in 2005, Bucaspor is playing in the Turkish Women's Football Premier League since the 2007–09 season. The team was runner-up in the seasons 2007–08 and 2008–09.

== Stadium ==
The team play their home matches in the Seyit Mehmet Özkan Facility in Buca.

== Statistics ==
Season	League	Rank	Pld	W	D	L	GF	GA	GD	Pts
2006–07	Women's League Div. B	5	14	6	2	6	36	32	+4	20
2007–08	Women's League Div. 2	2	12	10	1	1	90	7	+83	31
2008–09	Women's First League	2	18	13	1	4	67	21	+46	40
2009–10	Women's First League	5	18	10	2	6	54	36	+18	32
2010–11	Women's First League	9	22	6	1	15	36	63	−27	19
Green marks a season followed by promotion, red a season followed by relegation.

== Notable former players ==
- Bilgesu Aydın (2005–2011)
- Ezgi Çağlar (2006–2009)
- Hanife Demiryol (2006–2011)
- Gamze İskeçeli (2006–2009)
- Melis Özçiğdem (2006)

== See also ==
- Turkish women in sports
