= Gamze İskeçeli =

Turkish footballer (born 1983)

Personal information
- Date of birth: May 26, 1983 (age 43)
- Place of birth: İzmir, Turkey
- Position: Forward

Team information
- Current team: Konak Belediyespor
- Number: 9

Senior career*
Years	Team	Apps	(Gls)
1999–2001	İzmir Öztürkspor		
2001–2002	Van Eğitimspor		
2002–2006	Gazi Üniversitesispor		
2006–2009	Bucaspor		
2009–2013	Konak Belediyespor	78	(68)

International career^{‡}
2000–2001	Turkey U-19	16	(0)
2001–2013	Turkey	8	(0)

Managerial career
- 2022: Bornova Hitab Spor
- * Club domestic league appearances and goals as of 24 November 2013 ‡ National team caps and goals as of 28 November 2013

Gamze İskeçeli (born May 26, 1983) is a Turkish former women's football footballer. She lately played in the Women's First League for Konak Belediyespor as forward. She made her Champions League debut in 2013. İskeçeli was a member of the Turkish national team in 2001–2013.

== Early life ==
Gamze İskeçeli was born on May 28, 1983, in İzmir, western Turkey.

At the age of six, she got interested in playing football. Her father supported Gamze, and registered her in a İzmir-based sport club. However, at that time, there was no girls' football team available, so she had to play with her coeval boys. The talented girl even became top scorer among them.

She studied physical education and sports at Gazi University in Ankara between 2002 and 2007. Today, she works as a teacher of physical education in a primary school in Buca, İzmir.

== Club career ==
She entered İzmirspor on her father's and uncle's initiative. After playing football with boys for two years, she was admitted to Altay S.K. After the dissolving of Altay in a short time, she went to İzmir Öztürkspor. İskeçeli received her license on November 8, 1999. As once the goalkeeper got injured, İskeçeli, normally a forward, served also as goalkeeper. In this position, she transferred to the newly formed Van Eğitimspor at Van, eastern Turkey in February 2001.

She received an offer from Gazi University for higher education, and so moved to Gazi Üniversitesispor in January 2002. After four seasons with Gazi Üniversitesispor, and completing her education there, İskeçeli returned home and paused for a while. Then, she joined Bucaspor in the 2006–07 season.

Finally, she signed for Konak Belediyespor in the 2009–10 season. At the end of the 2012–13 season, she enjoyed league championship with her club Konak Belediyespor. Iskeçeli debuted in the 2013–14 UEFA Women's Champions League match against FC NSA Sofia on August 8, 2013, and played in the subsequent preliminary round matches.

Beside her playing career, she acts also as a football coach in the school she is serving as a teacher. After coaching initially the boys' team, she formed a girls' football team, which became provincial champion in futsal and football.

== International career ==
On September 9, 2000, İskeçeli became part of the U-19 national team in the match against Austrian junior women. She capped sixteen times in total, and participated thereby at the 2001 and 2002 UEFA Women's Under-19 Championship qualifying round matches.

İskeçeli made her debut in the national team on May 20, 2001, playing in the friendly match against the Greek team. She took part at the 2003 FIFA Women's World Cup qualification – UEFA Group 8, 2005 Summer Universiade, 2015 FIFA Women's World Cup qualification – UEFA Group 6 matches and a UEFA Women's Euro 2013 qualifying – Group 2 match. She capped seventeen times for the Turkey national team as of November 28, 2013.

In addition to her capacity as forward, İskeçeli played also as goalkeeper for the national team.

== Retirement ==
Gamze İskeçeli sustained an injury to her right leg during the 2015 FIFA Women's World Cup qualification – UEFA Group 6 match against Montenegro in İzmir on November 28, 2013. She decided to retire from active sports after the rupture of her cruciate ligament was cured.

== Career statistics ==
As of match played November 28, 2013

Club	Season	League			Continental		National		Total	
Club	Season	Division	Apps	Goals	Apps	Goals	Apps	Goals	Apps	Goals
İzmir Öztürkspor	1999–2001	Regional League			–	–	11	0	11	0
İzmir Öztürkspor	Total				–	-	11	0	11	0
Van Eğitimspor	2001–02	Regional League			–	–	12	0	12	0
Van Eğitimspor	Total				–	-	12	0	12	0
Gazi Üniversitesispor	2002–2006	Women's League			–	–	3	0	3	0
Gazi Üniversitesispor	Total				–	–	3	0	3	0
Bucaspor	2006–2009	First League	15	10	–	–	3	0	18	10
Bucaspor	Total		15	10	–	-	3	0	18	10
Konak Belediyespor
Konak Belediyespor	2009–10	First League	22	14	–	–	0	0	22	14
Konak Belediyespor	2010–11	First League	22	24	–	–	0	0	22	24
Konak Belediyespor	2011–12	First League	19	13	–	–	1	0	20	13
Konak Belediyespor	2012–13	First League	18	11	–	–	0	0	18	11
Konak Belediyespor	2013–14	First league	3	6	3	0	3	0	9	6
Konak Belediyespor	Total		84	68	3	0	4	0	91	68
Career total			99	78	3	0	33	0	135	78

== Managerial career ==
On 24 January 2022, İskeçeli was appointed head coach of the newly established İzmir-based club Bornova Hitab Spor for their first league season of 2021-22 Women's Third League. Her team finished the season undefeated after ten league and two play-off matches, became champion and was promoted to the Women's Second League. Her contract ended at the end of the season on 31 May 2022.

== Managerial statistics ==
As of 31 May 2022

Team	From	To	Record				
Team	From	To	G	W	D	L	Win %
Bornova Hitab Spor
Bornova Hitab Spor	2022	2022	12	12	0	0	100.00

== Honours ==
=== Player ===
Turkish Women's First League

Bucaspor
Runners-up (2): 2007–08, 2008–09
Konak Belediyespor
Champions (2): 2012–13, 2013–14
Runners-up (1): 010–11
Third places (1): 2009–10

=== Manager ===
Turkish Women's Third League

Bornova Hitab Spor
Champions (1): 2021-22
