= Özlem Özçelik =

Turkish volleyball player (born 1972)

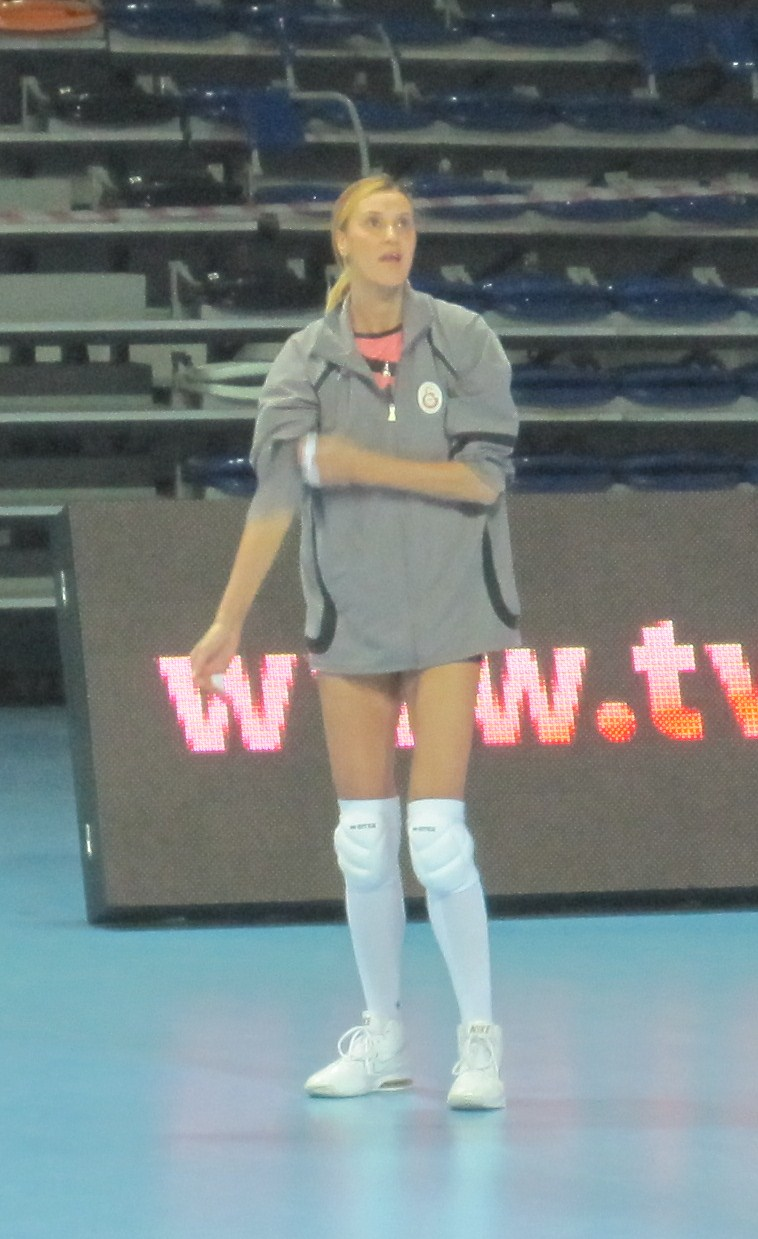

Personal information
- Full name: Özlem Özçelik-İşseven
- Nationality: Turkish
- Born: 1 January 1972 (age 54); İzmir, Turkey
- Height: 1.90 m (6 ft 3 in)

Volleyball information
- Position: Middle Blocker
- Current club: [Retired]
- Number: -

Career
Years	Teams
- - - 1998-2005; 2005-2006; 2006-2008; 2008-2009; 2009-2011; 2011-2012; 2012	VakıfBank Güneş Sigorta; Emlak Bank; Tuborg; Eczacıbaşı; Dynamo Moscow; Fenerbahçe Acıbadem; Türk Telekom Ankara; Galatasaray Medical Park; Beşiktaş; Ereğli Belediyespor

National team
1988-2007	Turkey
Medal record
Women's volleyball
Representing Turkey
Mediterranean Games
Gold medal – first place	2005 Almeria	Team

Özlem Özçelik-İşseven (born 1 January 1972) is a Turkish volleyball player. She is 190 cm tall and played as a middle blocker. Özlem played 312 times for the national team. She also played for Vakıfbank Güneş Sigorta, Emlak Bankası, Tuborg, Eczacıbaşı, Fenerbahçe Acıbadem, Türk Telekom, Galatasaray Medical Park in Turkey and Dynamo Moscow in Russia.

== Individual awards ==
- 2005 European Championship "Best Blocker"

== See also ==
- Turkish women in sports
