= Hanife Demiryol =

Turkish women's football midfielder

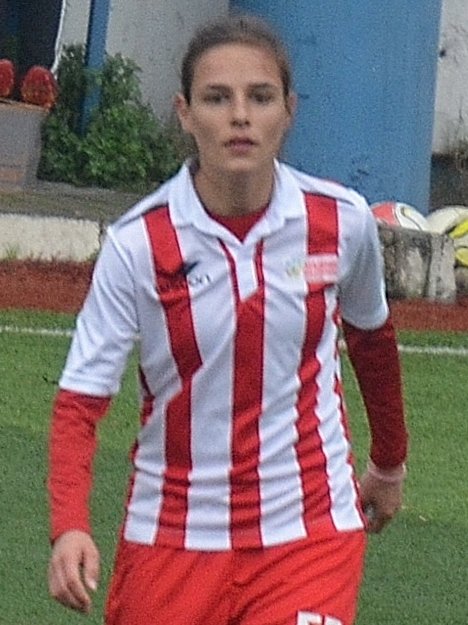
- Hanife Demiryol for Ataşehir Belediyespor in the 2014–15 season

Personal information
- Date of birth: September 19, 1992 (age 34)
- Place of birth: Konak, İzmir, Turkey
- Position: Midfielder

Team information
- Current team: Akdeniz Nurçelik Spor
- Number: 91

Senior career*
Years	Team	Apps	(Gls)
2006–2011	Bucaspor	54	(33)
2011–2012	Kdz. Ereğlispor	21	(11)
2012–2015	Ataşehir Belediyespor	36	(12)
2016	Konak Belediyespor	2	(0)
2016–2017	Osmaniye Demirspor	9	(7)
2017–2018	Balıkesir BB Spor	12	(0)
2019–	Akdeniz Nurçelik Spor	2	(3)

International career^{‡}
2006–2008	Turkey U-17	14	(3)
2009–2010	Turkey U-19	13	(4)
2014–2015	Turkey	4	(0)
- * Club domestic league appearances and goals as of March 3, 2020 ‡ National team caps and goals as of February 24, 2015

Hanife Demiryol (born September 19, 1992) is a Turkish women's footballer who plays as a midfielder in the Turkish Women's Second Football League for Akdeniz Nurçelik Spor. She was a member of the Turkish women's national team.

== Playing career ==
=== Club ===
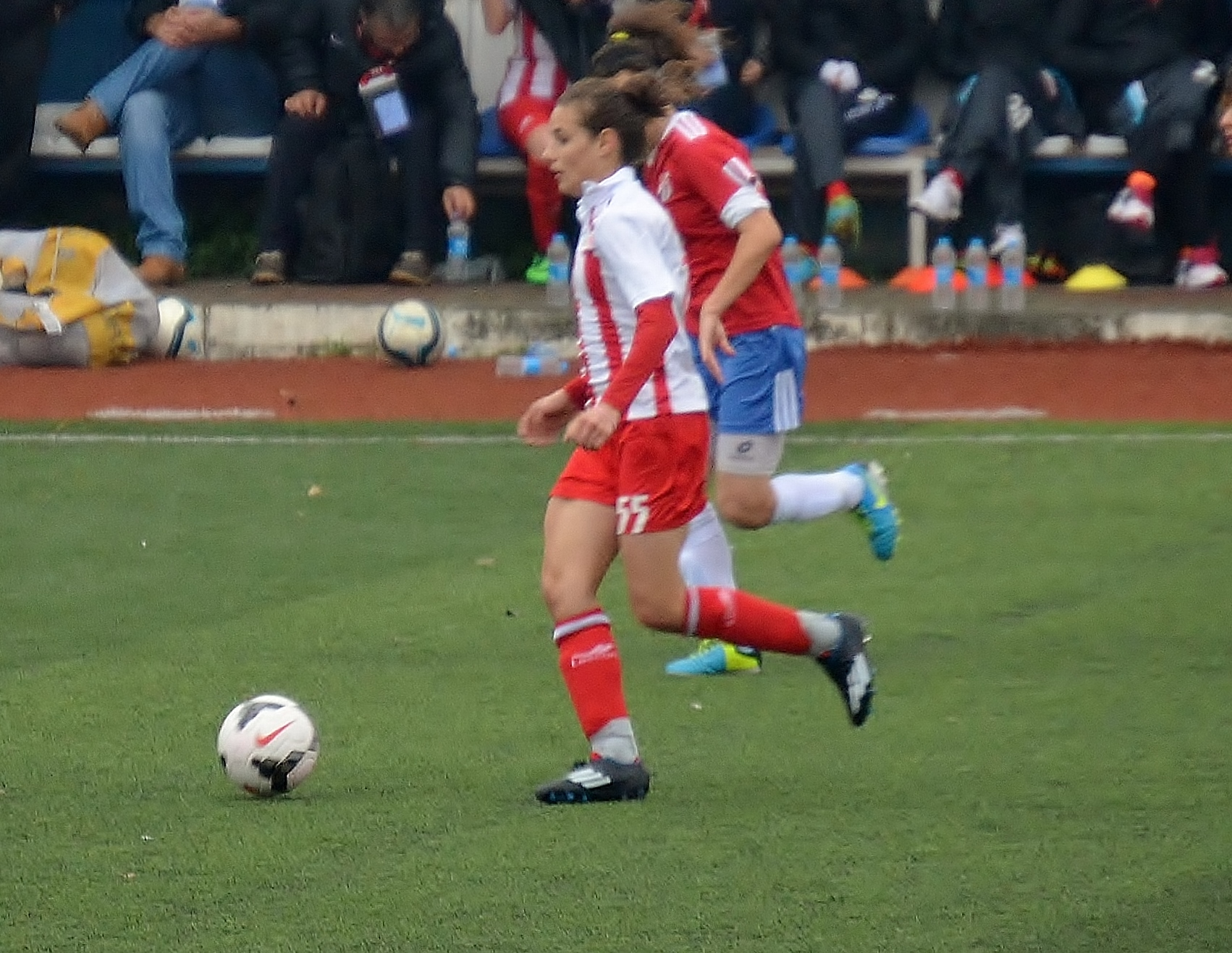
Hanife Demiryol driving the ball in the 2014–15 season match Ataşehir Belediyespor vs Adana İdmanyurduspor.

Hanife Demiryol obtained her license on April 28, 2006. She played in the youth team of Bucaspor in her hometown before she was admitted to the senior team to play in the Turkish Women's First League with her club. She capped 54 times and scored 33 goals with Bucaspor until the end of the 2010–11 season. Demiryol transferred to Kdz. Ereğlispor for the 2011–12 season. After playing in 21 matches and netting 11 goals, she moved to Ataşehir Belediyespor in Istanbul, where she played three seasons between 2012 and 2015. After a brief appearance for Konak Belediyespor in İzmir in the 2015–16 season, she transferred to Osmaniye Demirspor to play in the Second League. Demiryol joined Balıkesir Büyükşehir Belediyespor, a team in the Women's Third League in the same season, where she played one season.

After staying away two seasons from the football pitch, she joined Istanbul-based Akdeniz Nurçelik Spor to play in the Women's Second League.

=== International ===
Demiryol was part of the Turkey women's national under-17 team between 2006 and 2008. She capped 14 times and scored 3 goals for the girls' national team. In the years 2009–2010, she played for the Turkey women's national under-19 team, in total 12 times netting 6 goals.

She was called up to the Turkey women's national team and debuted at the 2015 FIFA Women's World Cup qualification – UEFA Group 6 match against Wales on April 4, 2014.

== Career statistics ==
As of March 1, 2020.

Club	Season	League			Continental		National		Total	
Club	Season	Division	Apps	Goals	Apps	Goals	Apps	Goals	Apps	Goals
Bucaspor	2006–08	First League	0	0	–	–	11	2	11	2
Bucaspor	2008–09	First League	17	13	–	–	5	2	22	15
Bucaspor	2009–10	First League	15	9	–	–	11	3	26	12
Bucaspor	2010–11	First League	22	11	–	–	0	0	22	11
Bucaspor	Total		54	33	–	–	27	7	81	40
Kdz. Ereğlispor	2011–12	First League	21	11	–	–	0	0	21	11
Kdz. Ereğlispor	Total		21	11	–	–	0	0	21	11
Ataşehir Belediyespor	2012–13	First League	7	2	–	–	0	0	7	2
Ataşehir Belediyespor	2013–14	First League	13	5	–	–	3	0	16	5
Ataşehir Belediyespor	2014–15	First League	16	5	–	–	1	0	17	5
Ataşehir Belediyespor	Total		36	12	–	–	4	0	40	12
Konak Belediyespor	2015–16	First League	2	0	–	–	0	0	2	0
Konak Belediyespor	Total		2	0	–	–	0	0	2	0
Osmaniye Demirspor	2016–17	Second league	9	7	–	–	0	0	9	7
Osmaniye Demirspor	Total		9	7	–	–	0	0	9	7
Balıkesir Büyükşehir Belediyespor	2016–17	Third League	12	0	–	–	0	0	12	0
Balıkesir Büyükşehir Belediyespor	Total		12	0	–	–	0	0	12	0
Akdeniz Nurçelik Spor	2019–20	Second League	2	3	–	–	0	0	2	3
Akdeniz Nurçelik Spor	Total		2	3	–	–	0	0	2	3
Career total			136	66	–	–	31	7	167	73

== Honours ==
Turkish Women's First League

Bucaspor
Runners-up (1): 2008–09

Kdz. Ereğlispor
Third place (1): 2011–12

Ataşehir Belediyespor
Runners-up (4): 2012–13, 2013–14, 2014–15, 2015–16
