= Büşra Ahlatcı =

Turkish footballer (born 1994)

Personal information
- Date of birth: January 23, 1994 (age 32)
- Place of birth: Kadıköy, Istanbul, Turkey
- Position: Midfielder

Team information
- Current team: Istanbul Defne Spor
- Number: 30

Senior career*
Years	Team	Apps	(Gls)
2008–2009	Ümraniye Mevlana Lisesi Spor	6	(0)
2009–2015	Ataşehir Belediyespor	66	(9)
2016	76 Iğdır Spor	4	(7)
2016	Ataşehir Belediyespor	3	(0)
2017	Adana İdmanyurduspor	3	(0)
2018–2019	Istanbul Defne Spor	7	(7)
Total		89	(23)

International career^{‡}
2011–2012	Turkey U-19	11	(2)
2012	Turkey	2	(0)
- * Club domestic league appearances and goals as of March 9, 2019 ‡ National team caps and goals as of October 25, 2012

Büşra Ahlatçı (born January 23, 1994) is a Turkish women's football midfielder. She last played for Istanbul Defne Spor with jersey number 30 in the 2018-19 Turkish Women's Third League. She was a member of the Turkey girls' national U-19 and Turkey women's teams.

== Career ==
Born in Kadıköy, Istanbul on January 23, 1994, Büşra Ahlatcı began playing football in her early years with the support of her father.

=== Club ===
She obtained her license on November 1, 2007. In the 2008–09 season, she joined the high school team Ümraniye Mevlana Lisesi Spor, which competed in the Women's Second League. Already the next season, she found a place in the Ataşehir Belediyespor squad playing in the First League.

Ahlatcı enjoyed two league championship titles with her club in two consecutive seasons, in 2010–11 and 2011–12. She debuted in the UEFA Women's Champions League playing in qualification round match against Gintra-Universitetas from Lithuania on August 11, 2011. She took part in two following matches of her club at the 2011–12 UEFA Women's Champions League – Group 4 round. She participated also at two of the three matches of the 2012–13 UEFA Women's Champions League – Group 1 round.

On February 5, 2016, she signed with 76 Iğdır Spor, which play in the Group 8 (Eastern Anatolia) of the Third League. Her team finished the 2015–16 season as runner-up. However, they failed to advance to the higher league losing the play-off match. In the 2016–17 season, she returned to her former club Ataşehir Belediyespor. However, she transferred to Adana İdmanyurduspor in the second half of the season.

She played in the 2018-19 Turkish Women's Third League for Istanbul Defne Spor.

=== International ===
Ahlatcı was admitted to the Turkey women's U-19 national team in 2011. She played her first match against Ukrainian juniors at the Kuban Spring Tournament on March 6, 2011. She capped 12 times for the U-19 nationals.

She was called up to the Turkey women's national team, and debuted in the UEFA Women's Euro 2013 qualifying – Group 2 match against the Swiss team on September 15, 2012. She took part in only two games of the tournament's ten matches of her country. She capped twice so far for the Turkey national team.

== Career statistics ==
As of DFebruary 26, 2017.

Club	Season	League			Continental		National		Total	
Club	Season	Division	Apps	Goals	Apps	Goals	Apps	Goals	Apps	Goals
Ümraniye Mevlana Lisesi Spor	2008–09	First League	6	0	–	–	0	0	6	0
Ümraniye Mevlana Lisesi Spor	Total		6	0	–	–	0	0	6	0
Ataşehir Belediyespor	2009–10	First League	17	2	–	–	0	0	17	2
Ataşehir Belediyespor	2010–11	First League	16	1	–	–	6	2	22	3
Ataşehir Belediyespor	2011–12	First League	17	5	–	–	0	0	17	5
Ataşehir Belediyespor	2012–13	First League	11	1	–	–	7	0	18	1
Ataşehir Belediyespor	2013–14	First League	5	0	–	–	0	0	5	0
Ataşehir Belediyespor	Total		66	9	–	–	13	2	79	11
76 Iğdır Spor	2015–16	Third League	4	7	–	–	0	0	4	7
76 Iğdır Spor	Total		4	7	–	–	0	0	4	7
Ataşehir Belediyespor	2016–17	First League	3	0	–	–	0	0	3	0
Ataşehir Belediyespor	Total		3	0	–	–	0	0	3	0
Adana İdmanyurduspor	2016–17	First League	3	0	–	–	0	0	3	0
Adana İdmanyurduspor	Total		3	0	–	–	0	0	3	0
İstanbul Defne SK	2018–19	Third League	7	7	–	–	0	0	7	7
İstanbul Defne SK	Total		7	7	–	–	0	0	7	7
Career total			89	23	–	–	13	2	102	25

== Honours ==
=== Club ===
Turkey Women's First League

Ataşehir Belediyespor
Winners (2): 2010–11, 2011–12
Runners-up (2): 2012–13, 2013–14

Turkey Women's Third League

76 Iğdır Spor
Runners-up (1): 2015–16
