= Şeyma Erenli =

Turkish-Australian footballer (born 1988)

Şeyma Erenli Kraemer
Personal information
- Birth name: Şeyma Erenli Kraemer
- Date of birth: 9 December 1988 (age 37)
- Place of birth: Melbourne, Victoria,Australia
- Height: 1.62 m (5 ft 4 in)
- Position: Midfielder

Youth career
- 2002: Ashburton Women's SC

College career
Years	Team	Apps	(Gls)
2008–2011	Indiana State Sycamores	53	

Senior career*
Years	Team	Apps	(Gls)
2003–2007	Ashburton Women's SC		
2012–2013	Ashburton Women's SC		
2013	Box Hill United SC		

International career
2010–2012	Turkey	5	(0)
- * Club domestic league appearances and goals

Şeyma Erenli Kraemer (born 9 December 1988) is a Turkish-Australian women's football midfielder. She was a member of the Turkey women's national team.

== Private life ==
Şeyma Erenli was born to Turkish immigrant parents Zeki and Ayşe Erenli in Melbourne, Victoria, Australia on 9 December 1988. Her father was an amateur footballer in Turkey. He continued to play in Australia with the Turkish club Gençlik Gücü. Şeyma was inspired by her father in football, and was supported by her entire family members.

She was in the high school at the Royal Melbourne Institute of Technology before she attended Indiana State University in Terre Haute, Indiana, the United States in 2008 to study physical education teaching. She graduated early December 2011, and went back to Australia in January 2012. However, she returned to the place of her alma mater in the United States in August 2013.

== Playing career ==
=== Club ===
Erenli began playing football in the age of six. Her first club was Endeavour United SC.

She played five seasons for Ashburton Women's Soccer Club in her hometown, which competed in the Victorian Women's Premier League. She captained the team in three seasons. She was named the Best Female Athlete in her class each year.

The 1.62 m (5 ft 4 in) tall midfielder played at World Women's Futsal Championship with the Australia women's national futsal team.

During her college years in the United States, she was a member of the Indiana State Sycamores from 2008 to 2011. The team competed in the Division 1, the highest level university league. She capped 53 times in three seasons.

After returning to Australia, she played with her former club Ashburton Women's SC. She then transferred to Box Hill United SC in her hometown.

She is known for not missing a penalty kick. She admits that she learned successful penalty kicking from her father.

=== International ===
Erenli was admitted to the Turkey women's national football team and debuted in the 2011 FIFA Women's World Cup qualification – UEFA Group 5 match against England in Walsall, England on 29 July 2010. She took part in the UEFA Women's Euro 2013 qualifying – Group 2 matches against Romania, and Switzerland. She capped in total five times for the Turkey national team.
