= Yılmaz Özlem =

Turkish footballer

Personal information
- Full name: Yılmaz Özlem
- Date of birth: 1 June 1972 (age 54)
- Place of birth: Bulgaria
- Height: 1.75 m (5 ft 9 in)
- Position: Defensive midfielder

Youth career
- Bursa Merinosspor

Senior career*
Years	Team	Apps	(Gls)
1991–1992	Bursa Merinosspor	34	(3)
1992–1994	İnegölspor	57	(7)
1994–1995	Gaziantepspor	11	(0)
1995–1997	Adanaspor	55	(4)
1997–2004	Ankaragücü	223	(25)
2005–2006	Manisaspor	29	(3)
2006–2007	Diyarbakirspor	17	(2)
2007–2008	Adanaspor	30	(7)
2008–2010	Bucaspor	42	(20)
2010–2011	Göztepe	8	(1)
- * Club domestic league appearances and goals

Yılmaz Özlem (born 1 June 1972) is a Turkish former professional footballer who played as a defensive midfielder.
