= Özlem Denizmen =

Turkish social entrepreneur

Ozlem Denizmen
- Özlem Denizmen
- Education: Cornell University (B.S.); MIT Sloan School of Management (MBA)
- Occupations: Head of Strategy at Doğuş Holding, Social Entrepreneur
- Known for: Founder of 'Para Durumu' (financial literacy initiative)
- Children: 2 (Timur Kocatepe and İnan Kocatepe)
- Awards: Young Global Leader, World Economic Forum (2011)

Ozlem Denizmen is the Head of Strategy at Dogus Holding, one of Turkey's major conglomerates and a board member at Dogus Automotive, an Istanbul Stock Exchange-30 company. Denizmen started her career at Merrill Lynch Investment Bank as a financial analyst in 1994. She holds a B.S. degree from Cornell University in Industrial Management and an MBA from the MIT Sloan School of Management. Denizmen attended leadership programs at Stanford University, GE Crotonville and Harvard Business School.

Denizmen is married and has two children, named Timur Kocatepe and Inan kocatepe.

== Social entrepreneurship ==
In early 2010 Denizmen launched the 'Para Durumu’ multi-media platform, which is Turkey's first financial literacy initiative. She performs a weekly show on A Haber TV channel, accompanied by a weekly column in Posta and Hurriyet newspapers, and presents at seminars and conferences as well as to students across the country. In 2011, Para Durumu was recognized by OECD.

Para Durumu established a new personal finance education movement for women with support of the Ministry of Family and Social Policies, Istanbul Metropolitan Municipality and Dogus Holding. The movement aimed to raise the financial awareness of 20,000 women in Istanbul by the end of 2013.

== Awards and honors ==
Denizmen was honored as ‘Young Global Leader' of 2011 by the World Economic Forum, as a White House Delegate at the 2010 Obama Presidential Summit on Entrepreneurship and as “Young Society Leader 2011” of the American Turkish Society. She was listed among ‘Top 100 Powerful Women of Turkey’ by Dunya Newspaper in 2011. Para Durumu was awarded the Jury Special Award as the best volunteer project in 2011 by the Corporate Volunteer Association of Turkey, which works to expand corporate volunteering in Turkey.

Denizmen was invited as a speaker and also as a judge to The First Child and Youth Finance International Summit and Award Ceremony, which is to be held April 3 & 4, 2012, in Amsterdam.
