= Bilgesu Aydın =

Turkish footballer (born 1994)

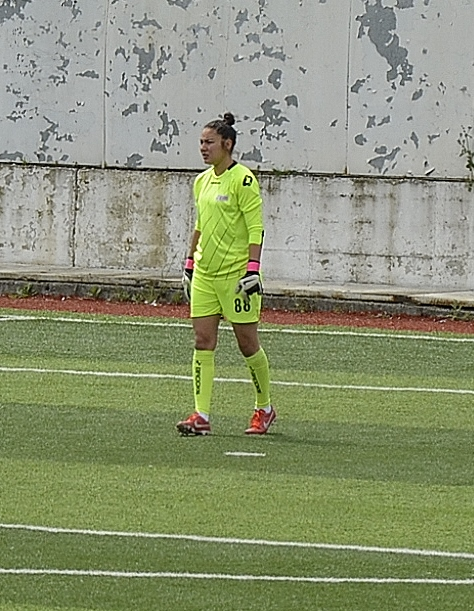
- Bilgesu Aydın for Ataşehir Belediyespor in 2014

Personal information
- Date of birth: June 8, 1994 (age 32)
- Place of birth: Denizli, Turkey
- Position: Goalkeeper

Team information
- Current team: Konak Belediyespor
- Number: 88

Senior career*
Years	Team	Apps	(Gls)
2009–2011	Bucaspor	19	(0)
2011–2012	Gazi Üniversitesispor	16	(0)
2012–2015	Ataşehir Belediyespor	22	(0)
2016–	Konak Belediyespor	41	(0)

International career^{‡}
2012	Turkey U-19	7	(0)
2017	Turkey	1	(0)
- * Club domestic league appearances and goals as of December 8, 2019 ‡ National team caps and goals as of March 5, 2017

Bilgesu Aydın (born June 8, 1994) is a Turkish women's footballer who plays as a goalkeeper in the Turkish Women's First Football League for Konak Belediyespor in İzmir. She is member of the Turkey women's national team.

== Life ==
Bilgesu Aydın was born in Denizli on June 8, 1994. She studied physical education and sports at Ege University in İzmir.

== Playing career ==
She began football playing encouraged by her mother, who took her to the local football club in İzmir, where the family moved to, and registered her. She bought her goalkeeper glove and shoes knowing that her daughter wanted to be a goalkeeper.

=== Club ===
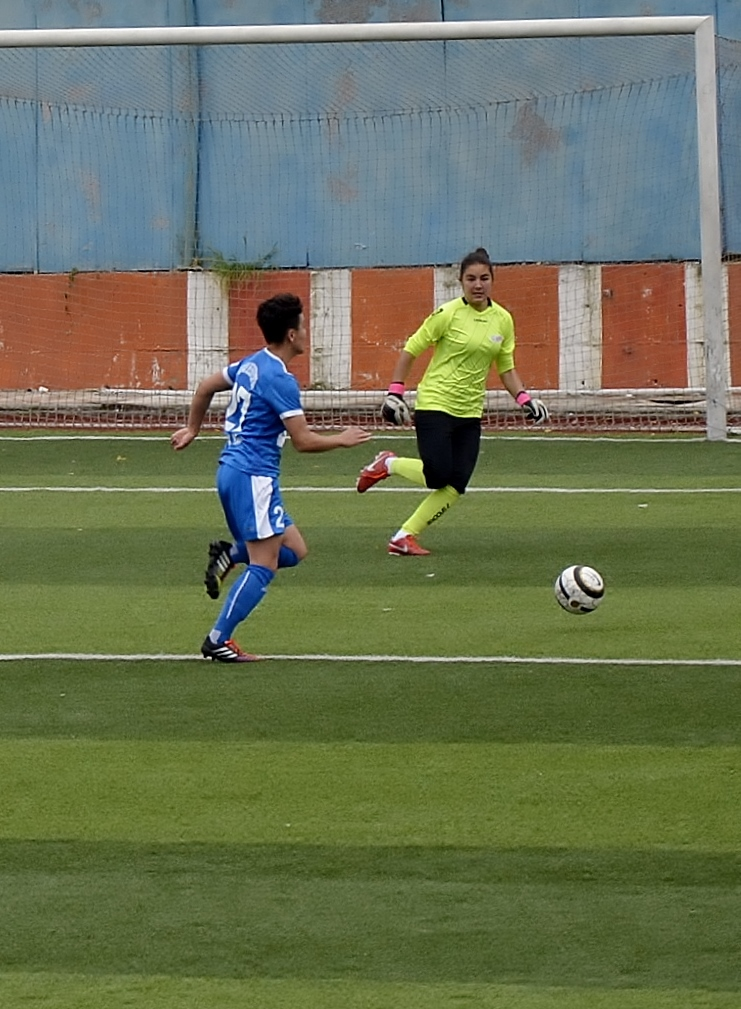
Bilgesu Aydın (right) playing for Ataşehir Belediyespor in the home match of the 2013–14 season against Konak Belediyespor

Aydın received her license for Bucaspor on May 29, 2009. She played two seasons for the team, capping 19 times during this time. In the 2011–12 season, she transferred to the Ankara-based Gazi Üniversitesispor, where she played one season and appeared in 16 games. On October 22, 2012, Bilgesu Aydın signed for Ataşehir Belediyespor in Istanbul. In the beginning of the second half of the 2015–16 season, she was transferred by the İzmir-based club Konak Belediyespor.At the end of the season, she enjoyed her team's champion title. She debuted and played at the Group 9 of the 2016–17 UEFA Women's Champions League qualifying round.

=== International ===
In December 2011, she was called up to the Turkey women's U-19 national team, and debuted in the friendly match against the Russian junior women on February 18, 2012. She took part in three matches of the 2013 UEFA Women's U-19 Championship First qualifying round – Group 5. Aydın capped 7 times for the nationals so far.

Aydın debuted in the Turkey women's national team playing in the 2017 Goldcity Women's Cup against Kosovo.

== Career statistics ==
As of match played December 8, 2019.

Club	Season	League			Continental		National		Total	
Club	Season	Division	Apps	Goals	Apps	Goals	Apps	Goals	Apps	Goals
Bucaspor	2009–10	First League	1	0	–	–	0	0	1	0
Bucaspor	2010–11	First League	18	0	–	–	0	0	18	0
Bucaspor	Total		19	0	–	–	0	0	19	0
Gazi Üniversitesispor	2011–12	First League	16	0	–	–	2	0	18	0
Gazi Üniversitesispor	Total		16	0	–	–	2	0	18	0
Ataşehir Belediyespor	2012–13	First League	10	0	–	–	5	0	15	0
Ataşehir Belediyespor	2013–14	First League	9	0	–	–	0	0	9	0
Ataşehir Belediyespor	2014–15	First League	2	0	–	–	0	0	2	0
Ataşehir Belediyespor	2015–16	First League	1	0	–	–	0	0	1	0
Ataşehir Belediyespor	Total		22	0	–	–	5	0	27	0
Konak Belediyespor	2015–16	First League	3	0	–	–	0	0	3	0
Konak Belediyespor	2016–17	First League	14	0	3	0	1	0	18	0
Konak Belediyespor	2017–18	First League	6	0	0	0	0	0	16	0
Konak Belediyespor	2018–19	First League	14	0	0	0	0	0	14	0
Konak Belediyespor	2019–20	First League	4	0	0	0	0	0	4	0
Konak Belediyespor	Total		41	0	3	0	1	0	45	0
Career total			98	0	3	0	8	0	109	0

== Honours ==
Turkish Women's First League

- Ataşehir Belediyespor
  - Runners-up (3): 2012–13, 2013–14, 2014–15
- Konak Belediyespor
  - Winners (2): 2015–16, 2016–17
  - Third places (2): 2017–18, 2018–19
