= Damla Deniz Düz =

Turkish water polo player

Personal information
- Nationality: Turkish
- Born: 22 August 1995 (age 31)
- Height: 177 cm (70 in)
- Weight: 65 kg (143 lb)

Sport
- Sport: Water polo
- Handedness: R
- Position: Wing
- Current club: Galatasaray SK
- Number: 11
National team
- Years: Team
- 2016: Turkey

Damla Deniz Düz (born 22 August 1995) is a Turkish female water polo player, playing at the wing position. She is part of the Turkey women's national water polo team. She competed at the 2016 Women's European Water Polo Championship.

She is a member of Galatasaray SK.
