= Pakize Gözde Dökel =

Turkish-German football player

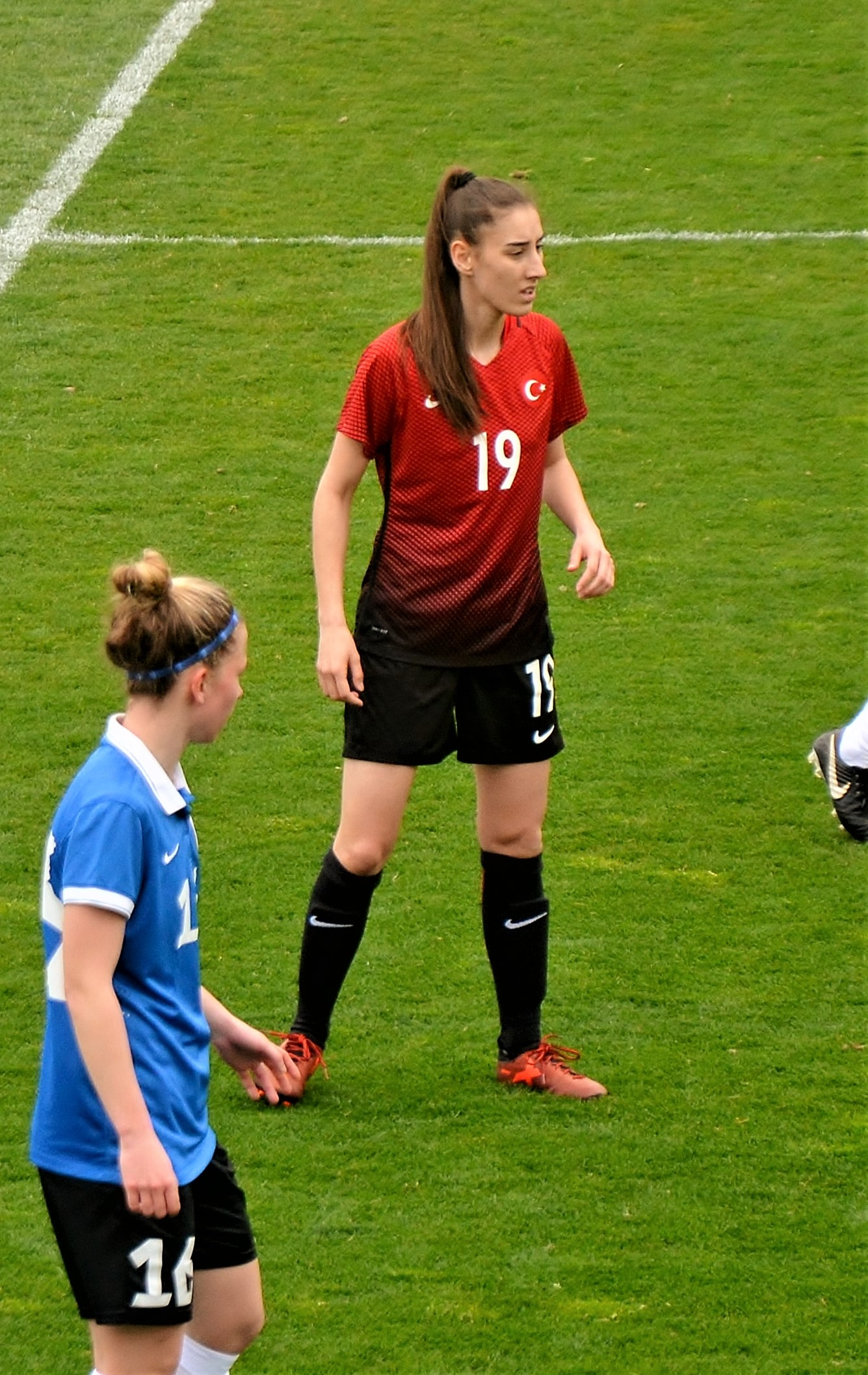
- Dökel (centre) playing for Turkey in 2018

Personal information
- Date of birth: 17 August 1997 (age 29)
- Position: Midfielder

Team information
- Current team: 1. FFC Recklinghausen
- Number: 7

International career^{‡}
Years	Team	Apps	(Gls)
2018–	Turkey	1	(0)
- ‡ National team caps and goals as of 7 April 2018

Pakize Gözde Dökel (born 17 August 1997) is a Turkish-German footballer who playas a midfielder in the German Frauen-Westfalenliga for 1. FFC Recklinghausen. She is a member of the Turkey national team.

She was called up to the Turkey national team, and she debuted in a friendly match against Estonia on 7 April 2018.
