= Damla Demirdön =

Turkish footballer (born 1990)

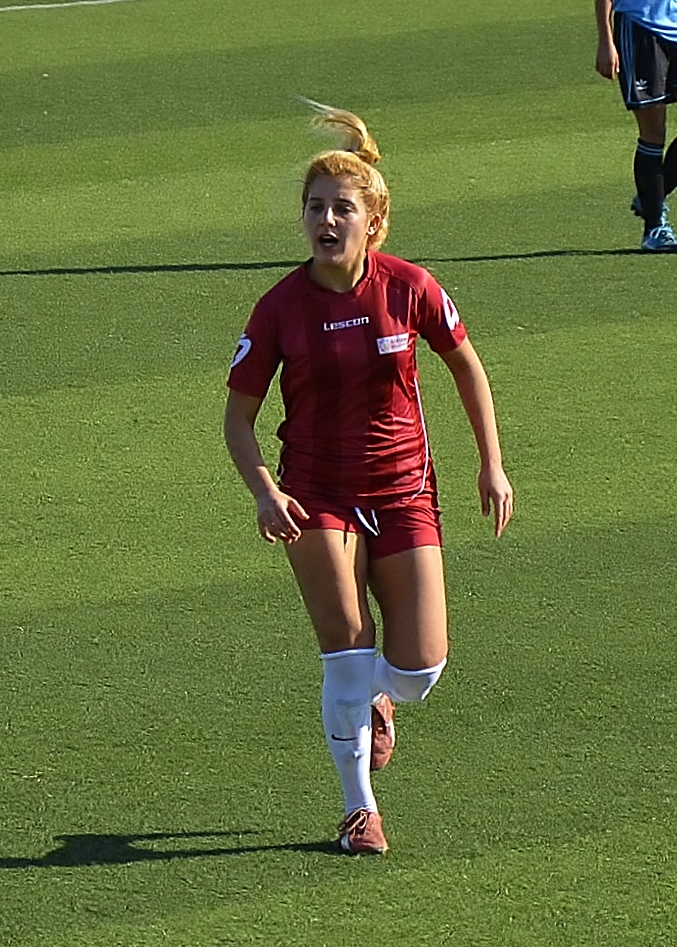
- Damla Demirdön for Ataşehir Belediyespor (March 2014)

Personal information
- Date of birth: 6 September 1990 (age 36)
- Place of birth: Ankara, Turkey
- Position: Midfielder

Team information
- Current team: Ataşehir Belediyespor
- Number: 17

Senior career*
Years	Team	Apps	(Gls)
2005–2010	Gazi Üniversitesispor	32	(3)
2010–present	Ataşehir Belediyespor	105	(1)
Total		137	(4)

International career^{‡}
2006–2008	Turkey U-19	13	(0)
2012	Turkey	3	(0)
- * Club domestic league appearances and goals as of 27 March 2016 ‡ National team caps and goals as of 19 September 2012

Damla Demirdön (born 6 September 1990) is a Turkish women's football midfielder currently playing in the Turkish Women's First Football League for Ataşehir Belediyespor in Istanbul with jersey number 17. She is member of the Turkey women's national team since 2007.

== Career ==
=== Club ===
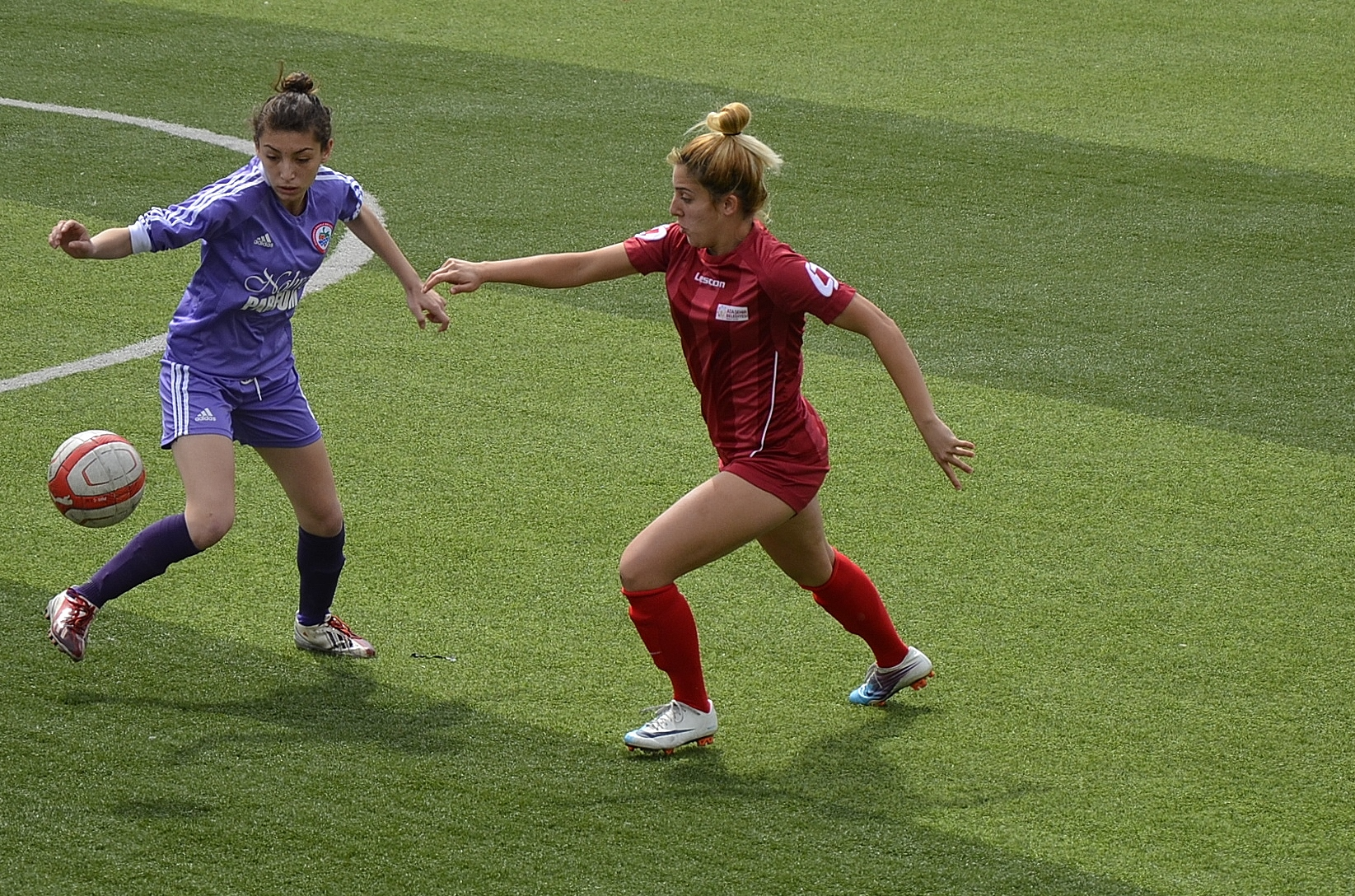
Damla Demirdön (red) playing for Ataşehir Belediyespor (2013–14).

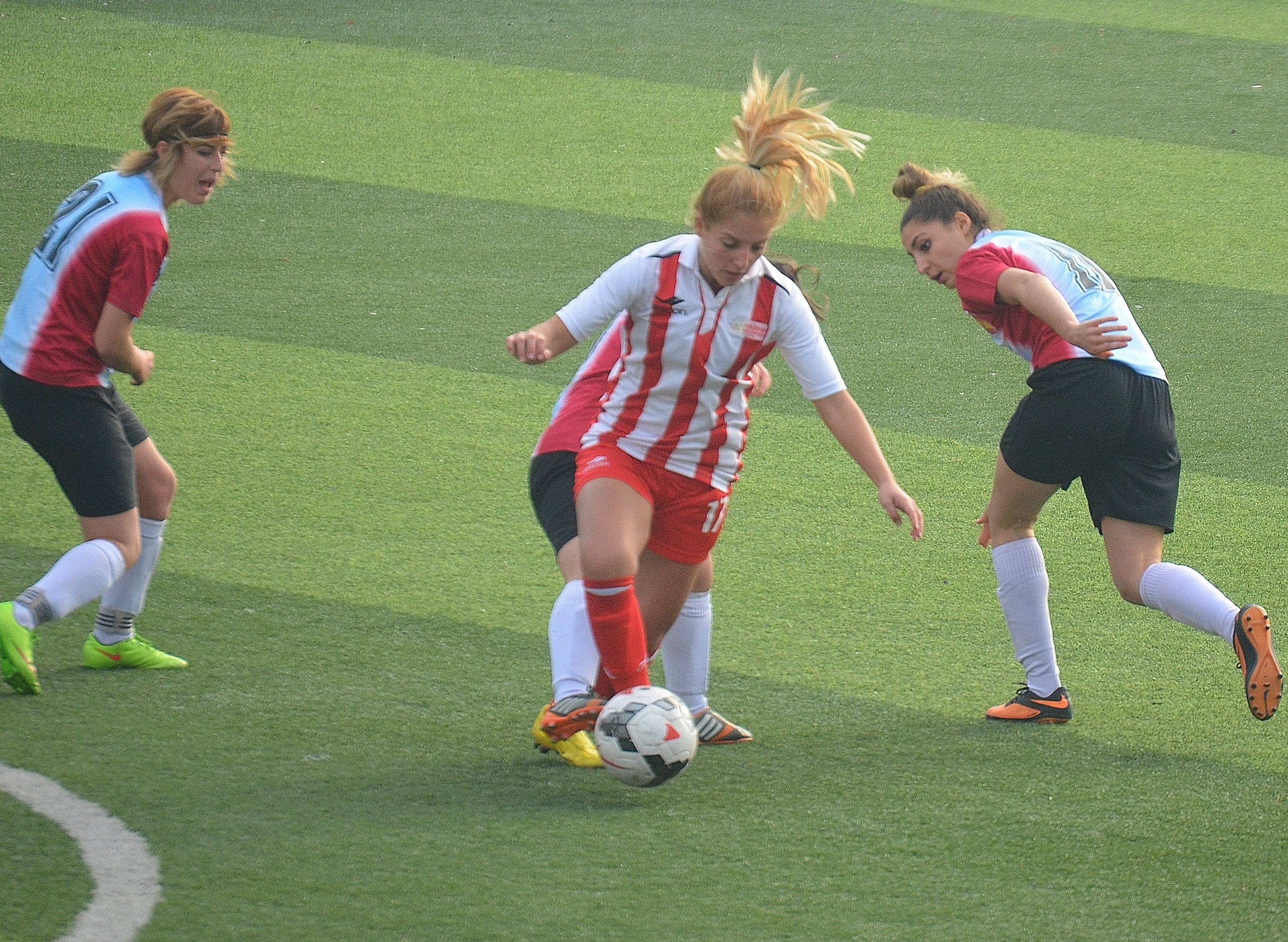
Damla Demirdön (white/red) playing for Ataşehir Belediyespor (2014–15).

Demirdön obtained her license for Gazi Üniversitesispor on 19 January 2005. She played for the team in her hometown until the end of 2009–10 season. She won two league championship titles with Gazi Üniversitesispor in the 2007–08 and 2009–10 seasons. She capped in total 69 times. Currently, she plays for the Istanbul-based Ataşehir Belediyespor, where she joined in the 2010–11 season. With Ataşehir, she became twice more league champion in the 2010–11 and 2011–12 seasons.

She took part at the 2011–12 UEFA Women's Champions League – Group 4, and 2012–13 UEFA Women's Champions League – Group 1 matches for Ataşehir Belediyespor.

=== International ===
Damla Demirdön was called up to the Turkey women's U-19 national team, and debuted at the friendly match against Macedonia on 22 January 2006. She participated at the UEFA Women's Under-19 Championship qualification round matches in 2007 and 2008. She capped 15 times in total for the junior women's national team until September 2008.

In 2007, Demirdön was admitted to the Turkey women's national team and played her first game against Bulgaria on 4 November 2007. She took part in three games of the UEFA Women's Euro 2013 qualifying – Group 2 games.

== Career statistics ==
As of match played 27 March 2016.

Club	Season	League			Continental		National		Total	
Club	Season	Division	Apps	Goals	Apps	Goals	Apps	Goals	Apps	Goals
Gazi Üniversitesispor	2005–2009	First League	16	1	–	–	13	0	29	1
Gazi Üniversitesispor	2009–2010	First League	16	2	–	–	0	0	16	2
Gazi Üniversitesispor	Total		32	3	–	–	13	0	45	3
Ataşehir Belediyespor	2010–11	First League	21	0	–	–	0	0	21	0
Ataşehir Belediyespor	2011–12	First League	15	0	3	0	1	0	19	0
Ataşehir Belediyespor	2012–13	First League	18	0	3	0	2	0	23	0
Ataşehir Belediyespor	2013–14	First League	18	0	–	–	0	0	18	0
Ataşehir Belediyespor	2014–15	First League	15	0	–	–	0	0	15	0
Ataşehir Belediyespor	2015–16	First League	18	1	–	–	0	0	18	1
Ataşehir Belediyespor	Total		105	1	6	0	3	0	114	1
Career total			137	4	6	0	16	0	159	4

== Honours ==
Turkish Women's First Football League
Gazi Üniversitesispor

Winners (2): 2007–08, 2009–10
Third place (1): 2008–09

Ataşehir Belediyespor

Winners (2): 2010–11, 2011–12
Runners-up (4): 2012–13, 2013–14, 2014–15, 2015–16
