= Dilara Özlem Sucuoğlu =

Turkish footballer playing in German regional league

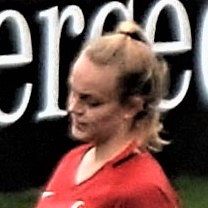
- Sucuoğlu playing for Turkey in April 2018.

Personal information
- Full name: Dilara Özlem Sucuoğlu
- Date of birth: 8 June 1998 (age 28)
- Place of birth: Troisdorf, Germany
- Position: Midfielder

Team information
- Current team: SV Menden 1912

Youth career
- 2011–2013: SV Menden 1912
- 2013–2015: Bayer 04 Leverkusen

Senior career*
Years	Team	Apps	(Gls)
- SV Menden 1912

International career^{‡}
2013	Turkey U17	6	(0)
2018	Turkey	1	(0)
- * Club domestic league appearances and goals as of 24 March 2018 ‡ National team caps and goals as of 7 April 2018

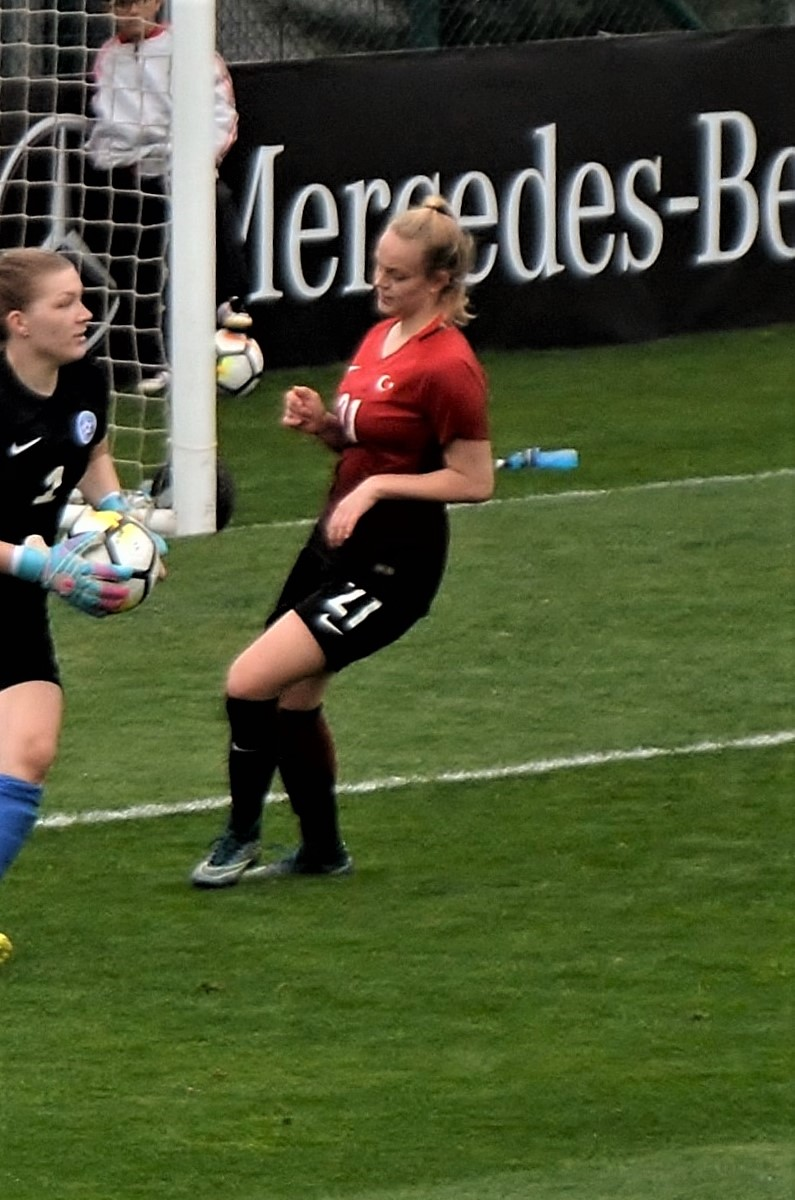
Diara Özlem Sucuoğlu challenging the goalkeeper of Estonia women's national team

Dilara Özlem Sucuoğlu (born 8 June 1998) is a women's footballer who plays in the German Frauen-Regionalliga-West for SV Menden 1912, as a midfielder.

Born in Germany, she played for the Turkey girls' under-17 team, and is currently a member of the senior Turkish national team.

== Personal life ==
Dilara Özlem Sucuoğlu was born to Şeref, a Turkish immigrant father, and Susanne, a German mother, in Troisdorf, Rhein-Sieg-Kreis, North Rhine-Westphalia, Germany on 8 June 1998. She has a younger brother, Timur, who also plays football.

Sucuoğlu attended realschule in Heimbach for her secondary education. She was successful in maths and sports at school, and planned a career in sport psychology.

Sucuoğlu holds Turkish-German dual citizenship through her Turkish father and German mother.

== Playing career ==
=== Club ===
Sucuoğlu began playing football at the age of five inspired by her father, who was the coach of the under-10 team SF Troisdorf. She played with boys in the team. Her father went on to coach the junior teams of IKV Eitorf 1984, and SV Umutspor Troisdorf. He supported Dilara Özlem continuing to play football.

Between 2011 and 2013, Sucuoğlu played in the B-Juniors Mittelrheinliga for the U-17 team of SV Menden 1912 in Sankt Augustin, although she belonged to the C-Juniors division due to her age. She was capped 16 times and scored two goals for them. In 2013, she transferred to the U-17 team of Bayer 04 Leverkusen. She played in 29 matches and scored a goal in the Women's Under 17 Bundesliga West/Southwest (B-Juniorinnen Bundesliga West/Südwest) until 2015.

Currently, she is a member of SV Menden 1912 playing as a midfielder in the Women's Regional League West (Frauen-Regionalliga-West).

=== International ===
Sucuoğlu was discovered by the Turkish national team during a tournament in Germany. She was admitted to the Turkey girls' U-17 team. She had difficulties communicating with the Turkish officials and players as she could not speak Turkish at all. She debuted on 8 April 2013 for the Turkey U-17 team in the match against France during the International Women's Under-17 Tournament in Madrid. She was capped for six games in the U-17s.

In November 2017, Sucuoğlu was named to the Turkey women's team. However, she did not appear in the friendly match played against Jordan. On 7 April 2018 Sucuoğlu made her first appearance for the national team in the friendly match against the Estonia women's national football team.
