= Shabnam Shiwan =

Fiji-born New Zealand designer

- Born: Fiji
- Education: Auckland University of Technology
- Employers: Saatchi & Saatchi; Alt Group; Osborne Shiwan

Shabnam Shiwan is a designer from Fiji, based in New Zealand.

== Early life ==
Shiwan was born and raised in Fiji, and moved to Auckland, New Zealand, for higher education. She studied at Auckland University of Technology, graduating with a Bachelor's degree in Graphic Design in 1995.

== Career ==
Shiwan has worked for Saatchi & Saatchi advertising agency and Alt Group. Shiwan is currently creative director at Osborne Shiwan, in partnership with Lloyd Osborne.

=== Recognition ===
In 2010, Shiwan's agency won Australasian Design Agency of the Year. Shiwan's work has also won awards at the Red Dot Awards (Germany), ADC (USA), TDC (USA), AIGA (USA), AGDA (Australia) and One Show (USA). Her agency has won 19 awards at the Designers Institute Best Design Awards between 2011 and 2017. She has also won 33 Best Design Awards while working at other agencies.
