= Damla Şentürk =

Turkish-American biostatistician

Damla Şentürk is a Turkish-American biostatistician and professor of biostatistics in the University of California, Los Angeles Fielding School of Public Health whose interests include longitudinal studies, functional data analysis, and applications of biostatistics in the study of autism and of dialysis outcomes.

== Education and career ==
Şentürk studied mathematics at Boğaziçi University, graduating in 1999. She came to the University of California, Davis for graduate study in statistics, earned a master's degree in 2001, and completed her PhD at Davis in 2004. Her dissertation, Covariate Adjusted Regression and Correlation, was supervised by Hans-Georg Müller.

She became an assistant professor of statistics at Pennsylvania State University in 2004, and moved to the UCLA Department of Biostatistics in 2011, adding a joint appointment with the UCLA Department of Statistics in 2014.

== Recognition ==
Şentürk became an Elected Member of the International Statistical Institute in 2006. She was named a Fellow of the American Statistical Association in 2020.
