= Özlem Başyurt =

Turkish footballer (born 1971)

Personal information
- Date of birth: September 20, 1971 (age 55)
- Place of birth: Giresun, Turkey

Senior career*
Years	Team	Apps	(Gls)
1994–1995	Osmanlıspor		
1995–1996	Gürtaşspor		

International career
1996	Turkey	1	(0)
- * Club domestic league appearances and goals

Özlem Başyurt (born September 20, 1971) is a Turkish former women's footballer. She was a member of the Turkey women's national football team. She played briefly basketball and serves as a basketball coach. She works as a high school teacher of physical education.

== Sports career ==
=== Football ===
She obtained her license for the Ankara-based club Osmanlıspor on March 28, 1994. After playing in the 1994–95 season, she transferred to the newly established Gürtaşspor.

Başyurt was admitted to the Turkey women's national team and played in the UEFA Women's Euro 1997 qualification – Group 8 match against Ukraine on August 24, 1996.

=== Basketball ===
Başyurt played basketball for Çevre Orman SK in the 2006–07 season. In 2014, she obtained a D-category basketball coach certificate. In the 2016–17 season, she coached the team Sortie in Büyükçekmece, Istanbul, which she is the president of.

== Personal life ==
Özlem Başyurt was born in Giresun, northern Turkey on September 20, 1971. She completed the middle school in her hometown. After finishing the Çankaya İMKB Hotel Management and Tourism Vocational High School, she studied Physical Education at Gazi University in Ankara. She works as a teacher of physical education at Tevfik Ercan Anadolu High School in Florya, Bakırköy, Istanbul.
