= Şebnem Taşkan =

Turkish-German footballer (born 1994)

Personal information
- Date of birth: 26 October 1994 (age 32)
- Place of birth: Hamburg, Germany
- Position: Midfielder

Team information
- Current team: Bramfelder SV

Senior career*
Years	Team	Apps	(Gls)
2016–	Bramfelder SV	10	(1)

International career^{‡}
2017	Turkey	1	(0)
- * Club domestic league appearances and goals as of 2 April 2017 ‡ National team caps and goals as of 6 April 2017

Şebnem Taşkan (born 26 October 1994) is a Turkish-German footballer who plays as a midfielder in the 2. Frauen-Bundesliga North for Bramfelder SV. She is a member of the Turkey women's national team.

== Career ==
Taşkan plays for Bramfelder SV in the German 2nd Women's Football Bundesliga North.

She was called up to the Turkey women's national team and debuted internationally on 6 April 2017 in the 2019 FIFA Women's World Cup qualification – UEFA preliminary round – Group 4 match against Montenegro.
