= 2011–12 Turkish Women's First Football League =

Turkish Women's First Football League
- Season: 2011–12
- Champions: Ataşehir Belediyespor
- Relegated: Mersin Camspor; Antalyaspor
- Matches: 120
- Goals: 483 (4.03 per match)
- All statistics correct as of 11 April 2017.

The 2011–12 season of the Turkish Women's First Football League is the 16th season of Turkey's premier women's football league. Ataşehir Belediyespor is the champion of the season.

== Teams ==
Location of teams in the 2011–12 season of Turkish Women's First Football League

Season 2011–12
Team	Hometown	2010–11
Antalyaspor	Antalya	
Adana İdmanyurduspor	Adana	
Ataşehir Belediyespor	Istanbul	
Çamlıcaspor	Istanbul	
Fomget Gençlik ve Spor	Ankara	
Gazi Üniversitesispor	Ankara	
İzmit Belediyespor	İzmit	
Kdz. Ereğlispor	Karadeniz Ereğli	
Konak Belediyespor	İzmir	
Lüleburgaz 39 Spor	Lüleburgaz	
Mersin Camspor	Mersin	
Trabzon İdmanocağı	Trabzon	

== Season ==
=== First stage ===
==== Group A ====
Pos	Team	Pld	W	D	L	GF	GA	GD	Pts	Qualification or relegation
1	Ataşehir Belediyespor	10	9	1	0	58	4	+54	28	Championship Group
2	Kdz. Ereğlispor	10	7	2	1	31	7	+24	23	Championship Group
3	Gazi Üniversitesispor	10	6	1	3	26	16	+10	19	Championship Group
4	İzmit Belediyespor	10	2	1	7	12	35	−23	7	Relegation Group
5	Fomget Gençlik ve Spor	10	2	0	8	7	32	−25	6	Relegation Group
6	Mersin Camspor	10	1	1	8	9	49	−40	4	Relegation Group

Updated to match(es) played on 11 April 2017. Source: Kadinlar 1. Ligi 2011-2012 Sezonu Fikstur ve Puan Cetveli TFF
Rules for classification: 1) Points

==== Results ====
Home \ Away	ATB	FOM	GAZ	IZM	KDZ	MER
Ataşehir Belediyespor	—	9–0	3–1	7–1	1–1	11–1
Fomget Gençlik ve Spor	0–4	—	1–3	1–2	1–3	2–0
Gazi Üniversitesispor	0–5	3–0	—	3–1	1–3	6–0
İzmit Belediyespor	0–8	0–2	2–4	—	0–2	2–2
Kdz. Ereğlispor	0–1	5–0	1–1	4–1	—	9–0
Mersin Camspor	0–9	3–0	0–4	2–3	1–3	—

Updated to match(es) played on 11 April 2017. Source: Kadınlar 1. Ligi 2011-2012 Sezonu
Legend: Blue = home team win; Yellow = draw; Red = away team win.

==== Group B ====
Pos	Team	Pld	W	D	L	GF	GA	GD	Pts	Qualification or relegation
1	Lüleburgaz 39 Spor	10	9	0	1	45	5	+40	27	Championship Group
2	Konak Belediyespor	10	5	3	2	20	5	+15	18	Championship Group
3	Trabzon İdmanocağı	10	4	4	2	21	8	+13	16	Championship Group
4	Adana İdmanyurduspor	10	3	3	4	11	14	−3	12	Relegation Group
5	Çamlıcaspor	10	4	0	6	11	28	−17	12	Relegation Group
6	Antalyaspor	10	0	0	10	2	50	−48	0	Relegation Group

Updated to match(es) played on 11 April 2017. Source: Kadinlar 1. Ligi 2011-2012 Sezonu Fikstur ve Puan Cetveli TFF
Rules for classification: 1) Points

==== Results ====
Home \ Away	AIY	ANT	CAM	LBZ	KOB	TIO
Adana İdmanyurduspor	—	2–0	1–3	2–1	0–0	1–1
Antalyaspor	0–3	—	0–1	1–8	0–4	0–4
Çamlıcaspor	3–1	4–1	—	0–7	0–3	0–4
Lüleburgaz 39 Spor	3–0	13–0	4–0	—	2–1	3–0
Konak Belediyespor	2–0	6–0	3–0	0–2	—	1–1
Trabzon İdmanocağı	1–1	5–0	4–0	1–2	0–0	—

Updated to match(es) played on 11 April 2017. Source: Kadınlar 1. Ligi 2011-2012 Sezonu
Legend: Blue = home team win; Yellow = draw; Red = away team win.

=== Second stage ===
==== Championship Group ====
Pos	Team	Pld	W	D	L	GF	GA	GD	Pts	Qualification or relegation
1	Ataşehir Belediyespor	10	8	0	2	30	6	+24	24	Qualification to Semi Final
2	Trabzon İdmanocağı	10	5	1	4	15	13	+2	16	Qualification to Semi Final
3	Kdz. Ereğlispor	10	5	1	4	22	21	+1	16	Qualification to Semi Final
4	Lüleburgaz 39 Spor	10	5	1	4	12	9	+3	16	
5	Konak Belediyespor	10	5	0	5	19	15	+4	15	
6	Gazi Üniversitesispor	10	0	1	9	7	41	−34	1	

Updated to match(es) played on 12 April 2017. Source: Kadinlar 1. Ligi 2011-2012 Sezonu Fikstur ve Puan Cetveli TFF
Rules for classification: 1) Points

==== Results ====
Home \ Away	ATB	GAZ	KDZ	KOB	LBZ	TIO
Ataşehir Belediyespor	—	5–1	5–1	1–0	2–0	1–0
Gazi Üniversitesispor	0–7	—	0–6	1–2	0–4	3–3
Kdz. Ereğlispor	3–2	5–1	—	2–1	1–0	0–1
Konak Belediyespor	0–5	3–1	7–1	—	1–0	3–0
Lüleburgaz 39 Spor	1–0	1–0	1–1	3–2	—	2–1
Trabzon İdmanocağı	0–2	5–0	3–2	1–0	1–0	—

Updated to match(es) played on 12 April 2017. Source: Kadınlar 1. Ligi 2011-2012 Sezonu
Legend: Blue = home team win; Yellow = draw; Red = away team win.

==== Relegation Group ====
Pos	Team	Pld	W	D	L	GF	GA	GD	Pts	Qualification or relegation
1	İzmit Belediyespor	10	8	2	0	35	11	+24	26	Qualification to Semi Final
2	Adana İdmanyurduspor	10	6	3	1	30	13	+17	21	
3	Çamlıcaspor	10	4	2	4	26	16	+10	14	
4	Fomget Gençlik ve Spor	10	3	3	4	6	10	−4	12	
5	Mersin Camspor	10	2	0	8	11	40	−29	6	Relegation to Second Football League
6	Antalyaspor	10	1	2	7	17	35	−18	5	Relegation to Second Football League

Updated to match(es) played on 12 April 2017. Source: Kadinlar 1. Ligi 2011-2012 Sezonu Fikstur ve Puan Cetveli TFF
Rules for classification: 1) Points

==== Results ====
Home \ Away	AIY	ANT	CAM	FOM	IZM	MER
Adana İdmanyurduspor	—	6–1	4–2	3–0	2–2	5–0
Antalyaspor	3–3	—	2–5	0–0	1–4	5–2
Çamlıcaspor	0–0	6–2	—	0–1	1–3	6–1
Fomget Gençlik ve Spor	0–3	2–1	0–0	—	0–1	2–0
İzmit Belediyespor	4–2	3–0	3–2	1–1	—	7–0
Mersin Camspor	1–2	4–2	0–4	1–0	2–7	—

Updated to match(es) played on 12 April 2017. Source: Kadınlar 1. Ligi 2011-2012 Sezonu
Legend: Blue = home team win; Yellow = draw; Red = away team win.

=== Knockout stage ===
Semi-finals
9 June - Alanya (Alanya Oba Stadium)
Ataşehir Belediyespor	11
İzmit Belediyespor	2
10 June - Alanya (Alanya Oba Stadium)
Trabzon İdmanocağı	0
Kdz. Ereğlispor	1

Final
14 June - Alanya (Alanya Oba Stadium)
Ataşehir Belediyespor	7
Kdz. Ereğlispor	1
Third place
13 June - Alanya (Alanya Oba Stadium)
İzmit Belediyespor	1
Trabzon İdmanocağı	3

==== Semi-finals ====
June 9, 2012
17:00 (UTC+03:00)

Ataşehir Belediyespor	11 – 2	İzmit Belediyespor
Merve Aladağ 3' 30' 72'; Yağmur Uraz 10' 58'; Onome Ebi 19' 35'; Büşra Ahlatcı 40' 49' 67'; Fatma Serdar 60'	Report	47' Buse Güngör; 54' Beyza Kocatürk

Alanya Oba Stadium, Alanya
Referee: Yusuf Eren Yurtsever

June 10, 2012
17:00 (UTC+03:00)

Trabzon İdmanocağı	0 – 1	Kdz. Ereğlispor
	Report	29' Hanife Demiryol

Alanya Oba Stadium, Alanya
Referee: Serdar Bahçivan

==== Third Place ====
June 13, 2012
18:00 (UTC+03:00)

İzmit Belediyespor	1 – 3	Trabzon İdmanocağı
Buse Güngör 13'	Report	7' 47' Fatma Kara; 40' Khatia Tchkonia

Alanya Oba Stadium, Alanya
Referee: Deybet Gök

==== Final ====
June 14, 2012
18:00 (UTC+03:00)

Ataşehir Belediyespor	7 – 1	Kdz. Ereğlispor
Reyhan Şeker 10'; Merve Aladağ 17' 67' 71'; Onome Ebi 35' 59' 87'	Report	33' Başak İçinözbebek

Alanya Oba Stadium, Alanya
Referee: Mustafa Kamil Abitoğlu
