= 2026–27 Galatasaray S.K. (women's football) season =

Galatasaray
2026–27 season
- Chairman: Dursun Özbek
- Head coach: Şaban Uzun
- Stadium: Florya Metin Oktay Facilities
- Turkish Women's Football Super League: Regular season
- Top goalscorer: League: Cristina Martín-Prieto (17); All: Cristina Martín-Prieto (17)
- Biggest win: 22–0 vs Şile BilgiDoğa (H), 23 October 2026, Super League
- All statistics correct as of 17 November 2026.

The 2026–27 season will be the 6th season in the existence of Galatasaray S.K. women's football team, and the club's fifth consecutive season in the top flight of Turkish football.

== Season overview ==
=== Pre-season ===
On 15 June, It has been announced that manager Gábor Gallai has parted ways with the club.

On 19 June, Şaban Uzun has been appointed as the new head coach of Galatasaray Women's Football Team.

On 19 August, The 2026–27 season Turkish Women's Football Super League fixtures have been announced.

On 5 September, Ercan Özer has been appointed as the new sporting director of Galatasaray Women's Football Team.

== Club ==
=== Staff ===
Position	Staff
Sporting Director	(Turkey) Ercan Özer
Administrative Manager	(Turkey) Gülfem Kocaoğlu
Head coach	(Germany) (Turkey) Şaban Uzun
Assistant Coach	(Turkey) Remzi Kahraman
Goalkeeper Coach	(Germany) Niko Sternberg
Match and Performance Analyst	(Turkey) Birkan İpek
Athletic Performance Coach	(Turkey) Furkan Demir
Physiotherapist	(Turkey) Esra Yapıcıoğlu
Physiotherapist	(Turkey) Aysima Dikkatli
Masseur	(Turkey) Yasin Genç
Interpreter	(Turkey) Cemre Yücetoker
Outfitter	(Turkey) Emre Uçar

Last updated: 5 October 2026.
Source: Kadın Futbol Takımı İdari ve Teknik Kadro – GALATASARAY.ORG

== Kits ==
Galatasaray's 2026–27 kits, manufactured by Puma, were unveiled on 4 July 2026 and went on sale on the same day.

=== Sponsor ===
- Supplier: Puma
- Name sponsor: —
- Main sponsor: —
- Back sponsor: —
- Sleeve sponsor: —
- Short sponsor: —
- Socks sponsor: —

=== Match ===
Home
Home alt.
Home alt.
Away
Third
Fourth
Goalkeeper 1
Goalkeeper 2
Goalkeeper 3

== Squad information ==
As of 22 September 2026

No.	Pos.	Nat.	Player	Since	Date of birth (Age)	Signed from
Goalkeepers
1	GK	(Italy)	Roberta Aprile	2025	22 November 2000 (age 25)	(Italy) Como
26	GK	(Turkey)	Esra Yarım	2024	4 January 2008 (age 18)	(Turkey) Eskişehir Büyükşehir Gençlik ve Spor Kulübü
92	GK	(Portugal)	Patrícia Morais	2026	17 June 1992 (age 34)	(Portugal) Braga
Defenders
5	DF	(Turkey)	Eda Karataş	2023	15 June 1995 (age 31)	(Turkey) ALG Spor
11	DF	(Greece)	Eleni Markou	2026	29 March 1995 (age 31)	(Germany) Eintracht Frankfurt
12	DF	(France)	Lahna Diawara	2026	12 September 2007 (age 19)	(France) Paris FC
13	DF	(Turkey)	Sıla Besra Tetik	2026	3 November 2005 (age 21)	(Turkey) Giresun Sanayispor
15	DF	(Portugal)	Carole Costa	2026	3 May 1990 (age 36)	(Portugal) Benfica
23	DF	(Turkey)	Narin Yakut	2025	26 April 2004 (age 22)	(Turkey) Fatih Vatan
64	DF	(Turkey)	Meryem Başkaya	2026	14 July 2005 (age 21)	(Denmark) Odense
Midfielders
6	MF	(South Korea)	Jang Chang	2025	21 June 1996 (age 30)	(South Korea) Incheon Hyundai Steel Red Angels WFC
14	MF	(Turkey)	Berra Pekgöz	2023	18 June 2007 (age 19)	(Turkey) Tunç Spor
16	MF	(Turkey)	Ebru Topçu (captain)	2022	27 August 1996 (age 30)	(Turkey) ALG Spor
17	MF	(Turkey)	İrem Eren	2024	17 August 2000 (age 26)	(Turkey) Fatih Vatan Spor
21	MF	(Poland)	Oliwia Domin	2026	2 January 2004 (age 22)	(France) Dijon FCO
22	MF	(Turkey)	Ecem Cumert	2024	7 February 1998 (age 28)	(Turkey) Fenerbahçe arsaVev
27	MF	(Netherlands)	Dana Foederer	2026	27 July 2002 (age 24)	(United States) Utah Royals
47	MF	(Turkey)	Arzu Akkurt	2021	1 July 2004 (age 22)	(Turkey) 1207 Antalya Spor
55	MF	(Turkey)	Elif Keskin	2025	12 January 2002 (age 24)	(Turkey) Beşiktaş
Forwards
7	FW	(Brazil)	Vitória Almeida	2026	26 August 1999 (age 27)	(Brazil) Flamengo
8	FW	(Brazil)	Marta Cintra	2025	27 April 2000 (age 26)	(Turkey) Fenerbahçe arsaVev
9	FW	(Spain)	Cristina Martín-Prieto	2026	14 March 1993 (age 33)	(Portugal) Benfica
10	FW	(Turkey) (Germany)	Melike Pekel	2025	14 April 1995 (age 31)	(Austria) SKN St. Pölten
20	FW	(Portugal)	Jéssica Silva	2026	11 December 1994 (age 31)	(Saudi Arabia) Al Hilal
71	FW	(Turkey)	Melike Öztürk	2025	1 April 2001 (age 25)	(Turkey) Fatih Vatan
98	FW	(Benin)	Aude Gbedjissi	2026	8 December 1998 (age 27)	(France) Lens

== New contracts and transfers ==
=== Contract extensions ===
Date	No.	Pos.	Nat.	Player	Status	Contract length	Contract ends	Source
3 July 2026	16	MF	(Turkey)	Ebru Topçu	Extended	One-year	30 June 2027	
23 August 2026	26	GK	(Turkey)	Esra Yarım	Extended	One-year	30 June 2027	
23 August 2026	17	MF	(Turkey)	İrem Eren	Extended	One-year	30 June 2027	
23 August 2026	47	MF	(Turkey)	Arzu Akkurt	Extended	One-year	30 June 2027	
23 August 2026	55	MF	(Turkey)	Elif Keskin	Extended	One-year	30 June 2027	
23 August 2026	71	FW	(Turkey)	Melike Öztürk	Extended	One-year	30 June 2027	
24 August 2026	5	DF	(Turkey)	Eda Karataş	Extended	One-year	30 June 2027	
24 August 2026	23	DF	(Turkey)	Narin Yakut	Extended	One-year	30 June 2027	
24 August 2026	14	MF	(Turkey)	Berra Pekgöz	Extended	One-year	30 June 2027	
26 August 2026	22	MF	(Turkey)	Ecem Cumert	Extended	One-year	30 June 2027	
27 August 2026	27	MF	(Netherlands)	Dana Foederer	Extended	One-year	30 June 2027	
27 August 2026	6	MF	(South Korea)	Jang Chang	Extended	One-year	30 June 2027	
27 August 2026	1	GK	(Italy)	Roberta Aprile	Extended	One-year	30 June 2027	
27 August 2026	7	FW	(Brazil)	Vitória Almeida	Extended	One-year	30 June 2027	
27 August 2026	8	FW	(Brazil)	Marta Cintra	Extended	One-year	30 June 2027	
27 August 2026	10	FW	(Turkey)	Melike Pekel	Extended	One-year	30 June 2027	

=== Transfers in ===
Date	No.	Pos.	Player	Transferred from	Fee	Source
18 June 2026	20	FW	(Portugal) Jéssica Silva	(Saudi Arabia) Al Hilal	Undisclosed	
6 July 2026	92	GK	(Portugal) Patrícia Morais	(Portugal) Braga	Undisclosed	
10 July 2026	9	FW	(Spain) Cristina Martín-Prieto	(Portugal) Benfica	Undisclosed	
13 July 2026	64	DF	(Turkey) Meryem Başkaya	(Denmark) Odense	Undisclosed	
13 July 2026	15	DF	(Portugal) Carole Costa	(Portugal) Benfica	Undisclosed	
21 July 2026	98	FW	(Benin) Aude Gbedjissi	(France) Lens	Undisclosed	
28 July 2026	13	DF	(Turkey) Sıla Besra Tetik	(Turkey) Giresun Sanayispor	Undisclosed	
18 August 2026	21	MF	(Poland) Oliwia Domin	(France) Dijon FCO	Undisclosed	
18 August 2026	11	DF	(Greece) Eleni Markou	(Germany) Eintracht Frankfurt	Undisclosed	
14 September 2026	12	DF	(France) Lahna Diawara	(France) Paris FC	Undisclosed	

=== Transfers out ===
Date	No.	Pos.	Player	Transferred to	Fee	Source
30 June 2026	1	GK	(Sweden) Angel Mukasa	(Italy) Lazio	End of contract	
30 June 2026	4	DF	(Nigeria) Oluwatosin Demehin	(Portugal) Benfica	End of contract	
30 June 2026	11	FW	(Cameroon) Marie Ngah	(Turkey) Fenerbahçe arsaVev	End of contract	
30 June 2026	13	MF	(China) Yang Lina	(Italy) Ternana Calcio	End of contract	
30 June 2026	18	MF	(Austria) Julia Hickelsberger	(Netherlands) PSV Eindhoven	End of contract	
30 June 2026	75	DF	(Turkey) Kezban Tağ	(Turkey) ABB Fomget	End of contract	
30 June 2026	99	FW	(Turkey) Benan Altıntaş	(Turkey) Trabzonspor	End of contract	

== Pre-season and friendlies ==
Win Draw Loss Fixtures

=== Pre-season ===
31 July 2026 Friendly	SFK 2000 (Bosnia and Herzegovina)	1–1	(Turkey) Galatasaray	Bosnia and Herzegovina
		Report	Cintra

21 August 2026 Friendly	Galatasaray (Turkey)	1–1	(Turkey) Beşiktaş	Şenlikköy, Bakırköy, Istanbul
	Karataş	Report		Stadium: Florya Metin Oktay Facilities

=== Mid-season ===
Friendly	v

== Competitions ==
=== Overall record ===
Competition	First match	Last match	Starting round	Record							
Competition	First match	Last match	Starting round	Pld	W	D	L	GF	GA	GD	Win %
Super League	29 August 2026	May 2027	Matchday 1	11	7	3	1	50	6	+44	63.64
Total				11	7	3	1	50	6	+44	63.64

Last updated: 14 November 2026
Source: FootyStats

=== Turkish Women's Football Super League ===
==== League table ====
Pos	Team	Pld	W	D	L	GF	GA	GD	Pts	Qualification or relegation
1	Fenerbahçe	9	8	1	0	39	1	+38	25	Qualification for the Champions League second qualifying round
2	Galatasaray	11	7	3	1	50	6	+44	24	Qualification for the Europa Cup first qualifying round
3	Beşiktaş	11	7	3	1	23	7	+16	24	
4	ABB Fomget	11	7	2	2	52	10	+42	23	
5	Trabzonspor	10	6	4	0	28	4	+24	22	

Updated to match(es) played on 14 November 2026. Source: TFF
Rules for classification: 1) Points; 2) Head-to-head points; 3) Head-to-head goal difference; 4) Head-to-head goals scored; 5) Goal difference; 6) Goals scored; 7) Play-off.

==== Results summary ====
Overall								Home						Away					
Pld	W	D	L	GF	GA	GD	Pts	W	D	L	GF	GA	GD	W	D	L	GF	GA	GD
11	7	3	1	50	6	+44	24	5	1	0	39	3	+36	2	2	1	11	3	+8

Last updated: 14 November 2026.
Source: Competitive matches

==== Results by matchday ====
Round	1	2	3	4	5	6	7	8	9	10	11	12	13	14	15	16	17	18	19	20	21	22	23	24	25	26	27	28	29	30
Ground	H	A	H	A	H	A	H	A	H	A	H	A	H	A	H	A	H	A	H	A	H	A	H	A	H	A	H	A	H	A
Result	D	D	W	W	W	W	W	D	W	L	W																			
Position	9	12	5	4	3	3	3																							

Updated to match(es) played on 19 November 2026. Source: Competitive matches
A = Away; H = Home; W = Win; D = Draw; L = Loss

==== Matches ====
The league fixtures were announced on 19 August 2026.

Win Draw Loss Postponed

29 August 2026 1	Galatasaray	0–0	Trabzonspor	Şenlikköy, Bakırköy, Istanbul
17:00 TRT (UTC+3)	Costa (yellow card) 37'; Karataş (yellow card) 45+3'; Pekel (yellow card) 72'; Morais (yellow card) 90+1'; Foederer (yellow card) 90+3'	Report 1 Report 2	Farrow (yellow card) 38'; Olise (yellow card) 69'	Stadium: Florya Metin Oktay Facilities; Referee: Ertuğrul Yolcu; Assistant referees: Muhammed Şamil Göçgün, Mehmet Furkan Kılınç; Fourth official: Emirhan Çimen

6 September 2026 2	Hakkarigücü	1–1	Galatasaray	Hakkâri
13:00 TRT (UTC+3)	Owusuaa 39', (yellow card) 60'; Çetin (yellow card) 65'; Ossol (red card) 92'	Report 1 Report 2	Öztürk 45', (yellow card) 83'; Silva (yellow card) 88'	Stadium: Merzan Şehir Stadı; Referee: Doğu Yılmaz; Assistant referees: Enes Bayhan, Turan Zehir; Fourth official: Gökhan Şenel

13 September 2026 3	Galatasaray	6–0	ABB Fomget	Şenlikköy, Bakırköy, Istanbul
16:30 TRT (UTC+3)	Martín-Prieto 12', 31' (pen.), 45+1'; Pekel 45', 59'; Cintra 89'	Report 1 Report 2	Kuč (yellow card) 52'	Stadium: Florya Metin Oktay Facilities; Referee: Erkan Erzen; Assistant referees: Caner Bür, Umut Çınar; Fourth official: Özge Tiraki

19 September 2026 4	Sultanbeyli Gücü	0–5	Galatasaray	Sultanbeyli, Istanbul
17:00 TRT (UTC+3)	Dülek (yellow card) 88'	Report 1 Report 2	Martín-Prieto 31'; Topçu 51'; Karataş 55'; Pekel 56'; Foederer (yellow card) 71'; Markou (yellow card) 78'; Cintra 85'	Stadium: Belediye 100. Yıl Stadı; Referee: Alper Kerem Aras; Assistant referees: Semra Bulut, Taha Abdullah Demirtaş; Fourth official: Berke Durmuşoğlu

26 September 2026 5	Galatasaray	4–1	Amed	Şenlikköy, Bakırköy, Istanbul
17:00 TRT (UTC+3)	Martín-Prieto 9', 23', 55'; Topçu (yellow card) 28'; Pekel (yellow card) 39'; Cintra 90+3' (pen.)	Report 1 Report 2	Kartal (yellow card) 62', (goal) 77'; Örnek (yellow card) 90+2'	Stadium: Florya Metin Oktay Facilities; Referee: Hatem Yarar; Assistant referees: Furkan Alegöz, Şaban Özkaya; Fourth official: Berat Bulut

17 October 2026 6	1207 Antalya	0–4	Galatasaray	Antalya
14:00 TRT (UTC+3)	Lueya (yellow card) 85'	Report 1 Report 2	Martín-Prieto 6', 44'; Markou 11', (yellow card) 42'; Foederer 21'	Stadium: Zeytinköy 2 Nolu Saha; Referee: İbrahim Elmas; Assistant referees: Abdulkadir Hasan Beyaztaş, Bilal Küçükbıyık; Fourth official: İsmail Karagöl

23 October 2026 7	Galatasaray	22–0	Şile BilgiDoğa	Bayrampaşa, Istanbul
14:00 TRT (UTC+3)	Öztürk 1', 17', 78' (pen.); Pekel 4'; Martín-Prieto 11', 23', 29', 37', 43'; Markou 15'; Cintra 19', 76'; Eren 40'; Gbedjissi 41', 44', 81'; Almeida 52', 61', 75' (pen.), 88'; Topçu 59'; Domin (yellow card) 79'; Silva 86'	Report 1 Report 2	Aletirik (yellow card) 78'	Stadium: Çetin Emeç Stadı; Referee: Erkan Erzen; Assistant referees: Yağmur Makbule Erden, Hayriye Kocabay; Fourth official: Arda Ege Kaya

28 October 2026 8	Yüksekova	1–1	Galatasaray	Şemdinli, Hakkâri
13:00 TRT (UTC+3)	Çalçınar (yellow card) 79'; Odabaşoğlu (yellow card) 89'; Bebia 86' (pen.); Haidara (yellow card) 90+2'	Report 1 Report 2	Pekel (yellow card) 20'; Domin (yellow card) 55'; Martín-Prieto 57'; Karataş (yellow card) 87'	Stadium: Şemdinli İlçe Stadı; Referee: Bestamin Üçkaç; Assistant referees: Hüseyin Yanık, Enes Bayhan; Fourth official: Muhammed Ali Kol

1 November 2026 9	Galatasaray	3–1	Ünye Kadın	Bakırköy, Istanbul
16:00 TRT (UTC+3)	Silva 1', (yellow card) 37'; Pekel 34'; Foederer (yellow card) 42'; Martín-Prieto 45+2'	Report 1 Report 2	Arpacı 27'; Abakah (yellow card) 54'	Stadium: Bakırköy Belediye 1 Nolu Saha; Referee: Berke Sabay; Assistant referees: Zübeyir Eraslan, Vasfiye Elçi; Fourth official: Erkan Yıldız

7 November 2026 10	Fenerbahçe arsaVev	1–0	Galatasaray	Istanbul
15:00 TRT (UTC+3)	Plummer (yellow card) 44'; Türkoğlu 90'	Report 1 Report 2	Foederer (yellow card) 12'; Öztürk (yellow card) 42'; Karataş (yellow card) 78'; Eren (yellow card) End of the match'	Stadium: Lefter Küçükandonyadis Stadium; Referee: Muhammed Ömür; Assistant referees: İsmail Semih İleri, Ahmet Taha Kuzyaka; Fourth official: Bektaş Onur Eren

14 November 2026 11	Galatasaray	4–1	Kayseri Kadın	Riva, Beykoz, Istanbul
13:00 TRT (UTC+3)	Martín-Prieto 3'; Cintra 25'; Costa 69'; Öztürk 87'	Report 1 Report 2	Omosuyi (yellow card) 72'; Bashiru (yellow card) 76'; Moïse 88'	Stadium: Riva Milli Takımlar Tesisleri 3 No'lu Saha; Referee: Oğuz Gözetenler; Assistant referees: Hüseyin Can, Umut Çınar; Fourth official: Dilan Çinar

9 December 2026 12	Haymana	v	Galatasaray	Haymana, Ankara
13:00 TRT (UTC+3)		Report		Stadium: Haymana İlçe Stadı

13 December 2026 13	Galatasaray	v	Beşiktaş	Bayrampaşa, Istanbul
13:00 TRT (UTC+3)		Report		Stadium: Çetin Emeç Stadı

19 December 2026 14	Bakırköy	v	Galatasaray	Istanbul
14:00 TRT (UTC+3)		Report

23 December 2026 15	Galatasaray	v	Giresun Sanayi	Istanbul
14:00 TRT (UTC+3)		Report

January 2027 16	Trabzonspor	v	Galatasaray
		Report

17	Galatasaray	v	Hakkarigücü	Istanbul
		Report

18	ABB Fomget	v	Galatasaray
		Report

19	Galatasaray	v	Sultanbeyli Gücü	Istanbul
		Report

20	Amed	v	Galatasaray
		Report

21	Galatasaray	v	1207 Antalya	Istanbul
		Report

22	Şile BilgiDoğa	v	Galatasaray
		Report

23	Galatasaray	v	Yüksekova	Istanbul
		Report

24	Ünye Kadın	v	Galatasaray
		Report

25	Galatasaray	v	Fenerbahçe arsaVev	Istanbul
		Report

26	Kayseri Kadın	v	Galatasaray
		Report

27	Galatasaray	v	Haymana	Istanbul
		Report

28	Beşiktaş	v	Galatasaray	Istanbul
		Report

29	Galatasaray	v	Bakırköy	Istanbul
		Report

May 2027 30	Giresun Sanayi	v	Galatasaray
		Report

== Statistics ==
=== Appearances and goals ===
No.	Pos	Nat	Player	Total		Super League	
No.	Pos	Nat	Player	Apps	Goals	Apps	Goals
Goalkeepers
1	GK	(Italy) ITA	Roberta Aprile	0	0	0	0
26	GK	(Turkey) TUR	Esra Yarım	1	0	1	0
92	GK	(Portugal) POR	Patrícia Morais	10	0	10	0
Defenders
5	DF	(Turkey) TUR	Eda Karataş	10	1	10	1
11	DF	(Greece) GRE	Eleni Markou	9	2	9	2
12	DF	(France) FRA	Lahna Diawara	1	0	1	0
13	DF	(Turkey) TUR	Sıla Besra Tetik	3	0	3	0
15	DF	(Portugal) POR	Carole Costa	10	1	10	1
23	DF	(Turkey) TUR	Narin Yakut	0	0	0	0
64	DF	(Turkey) TUR	Meryem Başkaya	1	0	1	0
Midfielders
6	MF	(South Korea) KOR	Jang Chang	6	0	6	0
14	MF	(Turkey) TUR	Berra Pekgöz	0	0	0	0
16	MF	(Turkey) TUR	Ebru Topçu	9	2	9	2
17	MF	(Turkey) TUR	İrem Eren	5	1	5	1
21	MF	(Poland) POL	Oliwia Domin	9	0	9	0
22	MF	(Turkey) TUR	Ecem Cumert	3	0	3	0
27	MF	(Netherlands) NED	Dana Foederer	10	1	10	1
47	MF	(Turkey) TUR	Arzu Akkurt	4	0	4	0
55	MF	(Turkey) TUR	Elif Keskin	8	0	8	0
Forwards
7	FW	(Brazil) BRA	Vitória Almeida	8	4	8	4
8	FW	(Brazil) BRA	Marta Cintra	11	6	11	6
9	FW	(Spain) ESP	Cristina Martín-Prieto	11	17	11	17
10	FW	(Turkey) TUR	Melike Pekel	11	5	11	5
20	FW	(Portugal) POR	Jéssica Silva	9	2	9	2
71	FW	(Turkey) TUR	Melike Öztürk	11	5	11	5
98	FW	(Benin) BEN	Aude Gbedjissi	11	3	11	3

Last updated: 17 November 2026.
Source: TFF.org

=== Goalscorers ===
Rank	No.	Pos.	Nat.	Name	Super League	Total
1	9	FW	(Spain)	Cristina Martín-Prieto	17	17
2	8	FW	(Brazil)	Marta Cintra	6	6
3	10	FW	(Turkey)	Melike Pekel	5	5
3	71	FW	(Turkey)	Melike Öztürk	5	5
4	7	FW	(Brazil)	Vitória Almeida	4	4
5	98	FW	(Benin)	Aude Gbedjissi	3	3
6	11	DF	(Greece)	Eleni Markou	2	2
6	16	MF	(Turkey)	Ebru Topçu	2	2
6	20	FW	(Portugal)	Jéssica Silva	2	2
7	5	DF	(Turkey)	Eda Karataş	1	1
7	15	DF	(Portugal)	Carole Costa	1	1
7	17	MF	(Turkey)	İrem Eren	1	1
7	27	MF	(Netherlands)	Dana Foederer	1	1
Own goals					0	0
Totals					50	50

Last updated: 17 November 2026.
Source: TFF.org

=== Clean sheets ===
Rank	No.	Pos.	Nat.	Name	Super League	Total
1	92	GK	(Portugal)	Patrícia Morais	4	4
2	26	GK	(Turkey)	Esra Yarım	1	1
Totals					5	5

Last updated: 14 November 2026.
Source: TFF.org

=== Disciplinary records ===
No.	Pos.	Nat.	Name	Super League			Total		
No.	Pos.	Nat.	Name	Yellow card	(yellow card) (yellow-red card)	Red card	Yellow card	(yellow card) (yellow-red card)	Red card
5	DF	(Turkey)	Eda Karataş	3	0	0	3	0	0
10	FW	(Turkey)	Melike Pekel	3	0	0	3	0	0
11	DF	(Greece)	Eleni Markou	2	0	0	2	0	0
15	DF	(Portugal)	Carole Costa	1	0	0	1	0	0
16	MF	(Turkey)	Ebru Topçu	1	0	0	1	0	0
17	MF	(Turkey)	İrem Eren	1	0	0	1	0	0
20	FW	(Portugal)	Jéssica Silva	2	0	0	2	0	0
21	MF	(Poland)	Oliwia Domin	3	0	0	3	0	0
27	MF	(Netherlands)	Dana Foederer	4	0	0	4	0	0
71	FW	(Turkey)	Melike Öztürk	2	0	0	2	0	0
92	GK	(Portugal)	Patrícia Morais	1	0	0	1	0	0
Totals				23	0	0	23	0	0

Last updated: 14 November 2026.
Source: TFF.org

=== Game as captain ===
Rank	No.	Pos.	Nat.	Name	Super League	Total
1	16	MF	(Turkey)	Ebru Topçu	8	8
2	5	DF	(Turkey)	Eda Karataş	3	3
Totals					11	11

Last updated: 14 November 2026.
Source: TFF.org
