= 2025–26 Galatasaray S.K. (women's football) season =

Galatasaray Gain
2025–26 season
- Chairman: Dursun Özbek
- Head coach: Gábor Gallai
- Stadium: Florya Metin Oktay Facilities
- Turkish Women's Football Super League: 3rd
- Top goalscorer: League: Marie Ngah (27); All: Marie Ngah (27)
- Biggest win: 17–0 vs ALG Spor (H), 15 October 2025, Super League
- All statistics correct as of 26 May 2026.

The 2025–26 season will be the 5th season in the existence of Galatasaray S.K. women's football team, and the club's fifth consecutive season in the top flight of Turkish football.

== Season overview ==
=== Pre-season ===
On 5 July, It was announced that the club parted ways with technical director Metin Ülgen.

On 8 July, A 2-year contract was signed with German coach Gábor Gallai.

On 9 September, The 2025–26 season Turkish Women's Football Super League fixtures have been announced.

== Club ==
=== Staff ===
Position	Staff
Administrative Manager	(Turkey) Gülfem Kocaoğlu
Head coach	(Germany) Gábor Gallai
Assistant Coach	(Turkey) Murat Erdemoğlu
Assistant Coach	(Turkey) Çağla Korkmaz
Match and Performance Analyst	(Turkey) Birkan İpek
Athletic Performance Coach	(Turkey) Furkan Demir
Goalkeeper Coach	(Turkey) Alaattin Altuner
Goalkeeper Coach	(Turkey) Asım Durmuş
Physiotherapist	(Turkey) Aysima Dikkatli
Physiotherapist	(Turkey) Esra Yapıcıoğlu
Masseur	(Turkey) Yasin Genç
Media and Communications Manager	(Turkey) İpek Birol
Interpreter	(Turkey) Cemre Yücetoker
Outfitter	(Turkey) Emre Uçar

Last updated: 26 January 2026.
Source: Kadın Futbol Takımı İdari ve Teknik Kadro – GALATASARAY.ORG

=== Staff changes ===
Change	Date	Staff member	Staff position	Ref.
Out	15 January 2026	(Turkey) Sanem Helvacıköylü	General Manager	

== Kits ==
Galatasaray's 2025–26 kits, manufactured by Puma, were unveiled on 26 June 2025 and went on sale on the same day.

=== Sponsor ===
- Supplier: Puma
- Name sponsor: GAİN
- Main sponsor: GAİN
- Back sponsor: —
- Sleeve sponsor: —
- Short sponsor: —
- Socks sponsor: —

=== Match ===
Home
Home alt.
Away
Away alt.
Third
Fourth
Goalkeeper 1
Goalkeeper 2
Goalkeeper 3

== Squad information ==
As of 8 March 2026

No.	Player	Nat.	Pos.	Since	Date of birth (Age)	Signed from
Goalkeepers
1	Angel Mukasa	(Sweden)	GK	2025	10 April 2002 (age 24)	(Sweden) FC Rosengård
12	Roberta Aprile	(Italy)	GK	2025	22 November 2000 (age 25)	(Italy) Como
26	Esra Yarım	(Turkey)	GK	2024	4 January 2008 (age 18)	(Turkey) Eskişehir Büyükşehir Gençlik ve Spor Kulübü
Defenders
4	Oluwatosin Demehin	(Nigeria)	DF	2024	13 March 2002 (age 24)	(France) Stade de Reims
5	Eda Karataş	(Turkey)	DF	2023	15 June 1995 (age 31)	(Turkey) ALG Spor
23	Narin Yakut	(Turkey)	DF	2025	26 April 2004 (age 22)	(Turkey) Fatih Vatan
75	Kezban Tağ	(Turkey)	DF	2025	17 September 1993 (age 32)	(Turkey) Beşiktaş
Midfielders
6	Jang Chang	(South Korea)	MF	2025	21 June 1996 (age 30)	(South Korea) Incheon Hyundai Steel Red Angels WFC
13	Yang Lina	(China)	MF	2026	13 April 1994 (age 32)	(China) Shanghai Shengli
15	Berra Pekgöz	(Turkey)	MF	2023	18 June 2007 (age 19)	(Turkey) Tunç Spor
16	Ebru Topçu (captain)	(Turkey)	MF	2022	27 August 1996 (age 30)	(Turkey) ALG Spor
18	Julia Hickelsberger	(Austria)	MF	2025	1 August 1999 (age 27)	(Germany) TSG 1899 Hoffenheim
22	Ecem Cumert	(Turkey)	MF	2024	7 February 1998 (age 28)	(Turkey) Fenerbahçe arsaVev
24	Arzu Akkurt	(Turkey)	MF	2021	1 July 2004 (age 22)	(Turkey) 1207 Antalya Spor
27	Dana Foederer	(Netherlands)	MF	2026	27 July 2002 (age 24)	(United States) Utah Royals
55	Elif Keskin	(Turkey)	MF	2025	12 January 2002 (age 24)	(Turkey) Beşiktaş
77	İrem Eren	(Turkey)	MF	2024	17 August 2000 (age 26)	(Turkey) Fatih Vatan Spor
Forwards
8	Marta Cintra	(Brazil)	FW	2025	27 April 2000 (age 26)	(Turkey) Fenerbahçe arsaVev
9	Vitória Almeida	(Brazil)	FW	2026	26 August 1999 (age 27)	(Brazil) Flamengo
10	Melike Pekel	(Turkey) (Germany)	FW	2025	14 April 1995 (age 31)	(Austria) SKN St. Pölten
11	Marie Ngah	(Cameroon)	FW	2024	20 October 2002 (age 23)	(Turkey) Hakkarigücü Spor
71	Melike Öztürk	(Turkey)	FW	2025	1 April 2001 (age 25)	(Turkey) Fatih Vatan
99	Benan Altıntaş	(Turkey)	FW	2023	10 November 2001 (age 24)	(Turkey) Fomget Gençlik ve Spor

== New contracts and transfers ==
=== Contract extensions ===
Date	No.	Pos.	Nat.	Player	Status	Contract length	Contract ends	Source
8 July 2025	16	MF	(Turkey)	Ebru Topçu	Extended	One-year	30 June 2026	
31 July 2025	22	MF	(Turkey)	Ecem Cumert	Extended	One-year	30 June 2026	
31 July 2025	99	FW	(Turkey)	Benan Altıntaş	Extended	One-year	30 June 2026	
31 July 2025	5	DF	(Turkey)	Eda Karataş	Extended	One-year	30 June 2026	
31 July 2025	17	GK	(Turkey)	Handan Kurğa	Extended	One-year	30 June 2026	
31 July 2025	77	MF	(Turkey)	İrem Eren	Extended	One-year	30 June 2026	
31 July 2025	24	MF	(Turkey)	Arzu Akkurt	Extended	One-year	30 June 2026	
31 July 2025	9	FW	(Turkey)	Elanur Laçın	Extended	One-year	30 June 2026	
31 July 2025	15	MF	(Turkey)	Berra Pekgöz	Extended	One-year	30 June 2026	
31 July 2025	26	GK	(Turkey)	Esra Yarım	Extended	One-year	30 June 2026	
19 August 2025	4	DF	(Nigeria)	Oluwatosin Demehin	Extended	One-year	30 June 2026	
26 August 2025	30	FW	(Cameroon)	Marie Ngah	Extended	One-year	30 June 2026	

=== Transfers in ===
Date	No.	Pos.	Player	Transferred from	Fee	Source
8 July 2025	10	FW	(Turkey) (Germany) Melike Pekel	(Austria) SKN St. Pölten	Undisclosed	
1 August 2025	19	FW	(Italy) Valentina Giacinti	(Italy) Roma	Undisclosed	
1 August 2025	18	MF	(Austria) Julia Hickelsberger	(Germany) TSG 1899 Hoffenheim	Undisclosed	
1 August 2025	1	GK	(Sweden) Angel Mukasa	(Sweden) FC Rosengård	Undisclosed	
1 August 2025	75	DF	(Turkey) Kezban Tağ	(Turkey) Beşiktaş	Undisclosed	
1 August 2025	55	MF	(Turkey) Elif Keskin	(Turkey) Beşiktaş	Undisclosed	
1 August 2025	23	DF	(Turkey) Narin Yakut	(Turkey) Fatih Vatan	Undisclosed	
1 August 2025	71	FW	(Turkey) Melike Öztürk	(Turkey) Fatih Vatan	Undisclosed	
11 August 2025	8	FW	(Brazil) Marta Cintra	(Turkey) Fenerbahçe arsaVev	Undisclosed	
8 September 2025	12	GK	(Italy) Roberta Aprile	(Italy) Como	Undisclosed	
15 September 2025	6	MF	(South Korea) Jang Chang	(South Korea) Incheon Hyundai Steel Red Angels WFC	Undisclosed	
16 September 2025	7	MF	(France) Lalia Storti	(France) Nantes	Undisclosed	
15 January 2026	27	MF	(Netherlands) Dana Foederer	(United States) Utah Royals	Undisclosed	
3 February 2026	13	MF	(China) Yang Lina	(China) Shanghai Shengli	Undisclosed	
8 March 2026	9	FW	(Brazil) Vitória Almeida	(Brazil) Flamengo	Undisclosed	

=== Transfers out ===
Date	No.	Pos.	Player	Transferred to	Fee	Source
30 June 2025	2	DF	(United States) Jazmin Wardlow	(Australia) Canberra United	End of contract	–
4 July 2025	12	FW	(Czech Republic) Andrea Stašková	(Turkey) Fenerbahçe arsaVev	End of contract	
10 July 2025	8	MF	(Turkey) Emine Ecem Esen	(Turkey) Fomget Gençlik ve Spor	End of contract	
14 July 2025	1	GK	(Turkey) Gamze Nur Yaman	(Turkey) Trabzonspor	End of contract	
15 July 2025	13	DF	(Turkey) Fatma Sare Öztürk	(Turkey) Trabzonspor	End of contract	
15 July 2025	7	MF	(Turkey) Arzu Karabulut	(Turkey) Fomget Gençlik ve Spor	End of contract	
15 July 2025	33	DF	(Turkey) Çiğdem Belci	(Turkey) Çekmeköy BilgiDoğa Spor	End of contract	
17 July 2025	19	FW	(Nigeria) Flourish Sabastine	(Turkey) Fenerbahçe arsaVev	End of contract	
20 July 2025	3	DF	(Norway) Ina Kristoffersen	(France) AS Saint-Étienne	End of contract	
20 July 2025	6	MF	(Turkey) Ayşe Demirci	(Turkey) Çekmeköy BilgiDoğa Spor	End of contract	
20 July 2025	10	MF	(Turkey) İsmigül Yalçıner	(Turkey) Çekmeköy BilgiDoğa Spor	End of contract	
20 July 2025	11	FW	(Colombia) Catalina Usme	(Peru) Universitario	End of contract	
20 July 2025	14	FW	(Spain) Laura Domínguez	(Italy) Parma Calcio	End of contract	
20 July 2025	18	MF	(Azerbaijan) Kristina Bakarandze		End of contract	
20 July 2025	20	DF	(Turkey) Berna Yeniçeri	(Turkey) Trabzonspor	End of contract	
20 July 2025	22	MF	(Turkey) (Azerbaijan) Nazlıcan Parlak	(Turkey) Çekmeköy BilgiDoğa Spor	End of contract	
20 July 2025	23	GK	(Turkey) Müge İnan Kandur		End of contract	
20 July 2025	25	FW	(Senegal) Hapsatou Malado Diallo	(Mexico) Juárez	End of contract	
20 July 2025	30	FW	(Cameroon) Marie Ngah		End of contract	
23 August 2025	17	GK	(Turkey) Handan Kurğa		Undisclosed	
15 January 2026	9	FW	(Turkey) Elanur Laçın		Undisclosed	
15 January 2026	7	MF	(France) Lalia Storti		Undisclosed	
23 January 2026	19	FW	(Italy) Valentina Giacinti	(Italy) Como 1907	Undisclosed	

== Pre-season and friendlies ==
Win Draw Loss Fixtures

=== Pre-season ===
27 August 2025 Friendly	Galatasaray	1–0	Amed Sportif Faaliyetler Kulübü
16:00 TRT (UTC+3)	Giacinti	Report

14 September 2025 Friendly	Galatasaray Gain	2–2	Beşiktaş	Şenlikköy, Bakırköy, Istanbul
	Cintra; Topçu	Report		Stadium: Florya Metin Oktay Facilities

=== Mid-season ===
v

== Competitions ==
=== Overall record ===
Competition	First match	Last match	Starting round	Final position	Record							
Competition	First match	Last match	Starting round	Final position	Pld	W	D	L	GF	GA	GD	Win %
Super League	21 September 2025	May 2026	Matchday 1	3rd	30	24	2	4	104	19	+85	80.00
Total					30	24	2	4	104	19	+85	80.00

Last updated: 26 May 2026
Source: FootyStats

=== Turkish Women's Football Super League ===
==== League table ====
Pos	Team	Pld	W	D	L	GF	GA	GD	Pts	Qualification or relegation
1	Fenerbahçe (C)	30	27	2	1	136	9	+127	83	Qualification for the Champions League second qualifying round
2	Trabzonspor	30	24	4	2	106	12	+94	76	
3	Galatasaray	30	24	2	4	104	19	+85	74	
4	ABB Fomget	30	20	3	7	83	24	+59	63	
5	Yüksekova	30	18	7	5	52	16	+36	61	

Source: TFF
(C) Champions

==== Results summary ====
Overall								Home						Away					
Pld	W	D	L	GF	GA	GD	Pts	W	D	L	GF	GA	GD	W	D	L	GF	GA	GD
30	24	2	4	104	19	+85	74	14	0	1	73	9	+64	10	2	3	31	10	+21

Last updated: 26 May 2026.
Source: Competitive matches

==== Results by matchday ====
Round	1	2	3	4	5	6	7	8	9	10	11	12	13	14	15	16	17	18	19	20	21	22	23	24	25	26	27	28	29	30
Ground	H	A	H	H	A	H	A	H	A	H	A	H	A	H	A	A	H	A	A	H	A	H	A	H	A	H	A	H	A	H
Result	W	W	W	W	W	W	W	W	W	W	L	W	L	W	W	W	W	W	L	W	W	W	D	W	W	W	D	L	W	W
Position	2	3	2	3	2	1	1	1	1	1	2	2	2	2	2	2	2	2	2	2	2	2	2	2	2	2	2	3	3	3

Updated to match(es) played on 26 May 2026. Source: Competitive matches
A = Away; H = Home; W = Win; D = Draw; L = Loss

==== Matches ====
The league fixtures were announced on 9 September 2025.

Win Draw Loss Postponed

21 September 2025 1	Galatasaray Gain	4–1	1207 Antalyaspor Kadın FK	Şenlikköy, Bakırköy, Istanbul
15:00 TRT (UTC+3)	Giacinti 14', 86'; Chang (yellow card) 45'; Laçın 88', 90+4'	Report 1 Report 2	Alouache 55'; Sivrikaya (yellow card) 64'	Stadium: Florya Metin Oktay Facilities; Referee: Hatice Aydın; Assistant referees: Umut İkisivri, Hayriye Kocabay; Fourth official: Aykut Özçelik

28 September 2025 2	Fatih Vatan Spor	0–4	Galatasaray Gain	Fatih, Istanbul
15:00 TRT (UTC+3)	Tetik (yellow card) 35'	Report 1 Report 2	Topçu 58'; Giacinti 61', 66'; Cintra 62'	Stadium: İBB Balat Sahası; Referee: Mert Aylıoğlu; Assistant referees: Neslihan Koç, Umut Çınar; Fourth official: Çiğdem Uruç

5 October 2025 3	Galatasaray Gain	5–1	Çekmeköy Bilgidoğa	Şenlikköy, Bakırköy, Istanbul
15:00 TRT (UTC+3)	Topçu 14', 46' (pen.); Karataş 69'; Ngah 78', 92' (pen.)	Report 1 Report 2	Demirci 53'	Stadium: Florya Metin Oktay Facilities; Referee: Özge Tiraki; Assistant referees: Bekir Emre Özcivelek, Yusuf Can Bük; Fourth official: Efe Kayauman

12 November 2025 4	Galatasaray Gain	2–0	Yüksekova	Şenlikköy, Bakırköy, Istanbul
14:00 TRT (UTC+3)	Pekel 4'; Karataş (yellow card) 27'; Storti (yellow card) 54'; Giacinti 57'	Report 1 Report 2	Teye (yellow card) 72'	Stadium: Florya Metin Oktay Facilities; Referee: Serdar Gülbetekin; Assistant referees: Ertuğrul Konak, Ümit Ayhan; Fourth official: Alperen Samanci

11 October 2025 5	Ankara Büyükşehir Bld. Fomget G.S.K.	1–2	Galatasaray Gain	Sincan, Ankara
14:00 TRT (UTC+3)	İçinözbebek (yellow card) 10'; Ovdiychuk 51'	Report 1 Report 2	Pekel 6'; Karataş (yellow card) 7'; Hickelsberger (yellow card) 41'; Ngah 81'; Demehin (yellow card) 83'; Laçın (yellow card) 87'	Stadium: Osmanlı Stadium; Referee: Tuğba Üçüncü; Assistant referees: Sevda Çayan, Aminenur Yıldırım; Fourth official: Muhammed Sefa Çolak

15 October 2025 6	Galatasaray Gain	17–0	ALG Spor	Şenlikköy, Bakırköy, Istanbul
12:00 TRT (UTC+3)	Giacinti 3', 40', 43', 45'; Ngah 10', 21', 36', 49', 64'; Eren 18'; Atıcı 25' (o.g.); Öztürk 26'; Laçın 56', 63'; Pekel 68', 82'; Hickelsberger 83'	Report 1 Report 2	Acar (yellow card) 25'	Stadium: Florya Metin Oktay Facilities; Referee: Çiğdem Uruç; Assistant referees: Yücel Alkaşi, Taner Çıracı; Fourth official: Kaan Şeremet

2 November 2025 7	Ünye Kadın SK	0–1	Galatasaray Gain	Ünye, Ordu
14:00 TRT (UTC+3)		Report 1 Report 2	Storti (yellow card) 48'; Giacinti 72'; Demehin (yellow card) 79'	Stadium: Ünye İlçe Stadium; Referee: Mert Demiroğlu; Assistant referees: Sefa Adayın, Ömer Faruk Çalışıcı; Fourth official: Eyyüp Ensar Seren

8 November 2025 8	Galatasaray Gain	5–0	Beşiktaş	Şenlikköy, Bakırköy, Istanbul
14:00 TRT (UTC+3)	Giacinti 32'; Topçu 39'; Cintra 45+1', (yellow card) 45+1'; Ngah 75', 90+1'; Demehin (yellow card) 79'; Karataş (yellow card) 85'	Report 1 Report 2	Civelek (yellow card) 42'	Stadium: Florya Metin Oktay Facilities; Referee: Havva Nur Demir; Assistant referees: Esra Arıkboğa, Semra Bulut; Fourth official: Emine Öz

16 November 2025 9	Prolift Giresun Sanayispor	0–1	Galatasaray Gain	Giresun District, Giresun
14:00 TRT (UTC+3)	Harvey (yellow card) 83'	Report 1 Report 2	Altıntaş (yellow card) 60'; Öztürk (yellow card) 83'; Giacinti 89'; Demehin (yellow card) 90'	Stadium: 75. Yıl Futbol Sahası; Referee: Osman Kadir Topkaya; Assistant referees: Esma Aydın, Rahmi Görçay; Fourth official: Begüm Sedef Şensoy

22 November 2025 10	Galatasaray Gain	3–0 (w/o)	Bornova Hitab Spor
		Report

7 December 2025 11	Fenerbahçe Arsavev	1–0	Galatasaray Gain	Kadıköy, Istanbul
14:00 TRT (UTC+3)	Cox (yellow card) 33', (goal) 64' (pen.); Kaya (yellow card) 78'	Report 1 Report 2	Demehin (yellow card) 20'; Hickelsberger (yellow card) 30'; Giacinti (yellow card) 61'; Cumert (yellow card) 61'	Stadium: Chobani Stadium; Referee: Hatice Aydın; Assistant referees: Engin Yılmaz, Yusuf Can Bük; Fourth official: Özge Tiraki

14 December 2025 12	Galatasaray Gain	4–2	Hakkarigücü Spor	Şenlikköy, Bakırköy, Istanbul
14:00 TRT (UTC+3)	Ngah 6'; Karataş 58'; Hickelsberger 69'; Akkurt (yellow card) 80'; Giacinti 90+3'	Report 1 Report 2	Ergen (yellow card) 31'; Tembo 47'; Owusuaa 81'; Küçükbirinci (yellow card) 89'	Stadium: Florya Metin Oktay Facilities; Referee: Sarp Özdemir Baştuğ; Assistant referees: Yücel Alkaşi, Yasin Aktaş; Fourth official: Furkan Hısım

21 December 2025 13	Trabzonspor	1–0	Galatasaray Gain	Ortahisar, Trabzon
14:00 TRT (UTC+3)	Ruess (yellow card) 67'; Oleszkiewicz 73', (yellow card) 90'; Ardos (yellow card) 82'; Yeniçeri (yellow card) 87'	Report 1 Report 2	Öztürk (yellow card) 29'; Altıntaş (yellow card) 90'	Stadium: Trabzonspor Kadir Özcan Tesisleri; Referee: Aslan Gökhan Çelik; Assistant referees: Arslan Sevinç, Furkan Şenel; Fourth official: Adem Karakaya

28 December 2025 14	Galatasaray Gain	3–1	Amed Sportif Faaliyetler	Şenlikköy, Bakırköy, Istanbul
14:00 TRT (UTC+3)	Topçu 11'; Ngah 54'; Cumert (yellow card) 59'; Giacinti 77'	Report 1 Report 2	Gómez 9', (yellow card) 59'	Stadium: Florya Metin Oktay Facilities; Referee: Alp Tanırgan; Assistant referees: Nimet Altunkıran Gergin, Mustafa Poyraz; Fourth official: Serdar Gülbetekin

18 January 2026 15	Beylerbeyi Spor Kulübü	0–3 (w/o)	Galatasaray Gain
		Report

26 January 2026 16	1207 Antalyaspor Kadın FK	0–3	Galatasaray Gain	Antalya
12:00 TRT (UTC+3)	Martinez (yellow card) 58'; Şanver (yellow card) 83'	Report 1 Report 2	Ngah 7', 56'; Hickelsberger (yellow card) 31'; Karataş (yellow card) 45+1'; Keskin (yellow card) 59'; Öztürk (yellow card) 59'; Altıntaş 87'	Stadium: Zeytinköy 3 Nolu Saha; Referee: Yiğit Bora Çağıran; Assistant referees: İlyas Mert Öztürk, Metehan Çetin; Fourth official: Kaan Alaşahin

1 February 2026 17	Galatasaray Gain	9–0	Fatih Vatan Spor	Şenlikköy, Bakırköy, Istanbul
12:00 TRT (UTC+3)	Öztürk 2'; Chang 18'; Ngah 25', 48', 68'; Cintra 39'; Hickelsberger 74', 79'; Pekgöz 94'	Report 1 Report 2	Dülek (yellow card) 60'; Doğan (yellow card) 88'	Stadium: Florya Metin Oktay Facilities; Referee: Yusuf Akköse; Assistant referees: Caner Bür, Yağmur Makbule Erden; Fourth official: Seher Kazanç

8 February 2026 18	Çekmeköy Bilgidoğa	0–4	Galatasaray Gain	Şile, Istanbul
12:00 TRT (UTC+3)	Yılmaz (yellow card) 46'; Dao (yellow card) 82'	Report 1 Report 2	Ngah 25'; Hickelsberger 47'; Chang 55'; Öztürk 81'	Stadium: Şile İlçe Stadı; Referee: Melek Pelin Sayar; Assistant referees: Barış Yiğit, Şinasi Zengin; Fourth official: Burçin Kılıç

22 April 2026 19	Yüksekova	2–1	Galatasaray Gain	Şemdinli, Hakkâri
13:00 TRT (UTC+3)	Adubea 36'; Bebia 64' (pen.)	Report 1 Report 2	Cintra 59'	Stadium: Şemdinli İlçe Stadı; Referee: Mehmet Terece; Assistant referees: Hamdiye Çelik, Burak Avcı; Fourth official: Gökhan Şenel
Note: The match, originally scheduled for 14 February 2026, the match has been postponed to a later date by the Turkish Football Federation due to adverse weather conditions.

20 February 2026 20	Galatasaray Gain	3–0	Ankara Büyükşehir Bld. Fomget G.S.K.	Şenlikköy, Bakırköy, Istanbul
12:00 TRT (UTC+3)	Cintra 24', 83'; Keskin (yellow card) 32'; Ngah 55'	Report 1 Report 2		Stadium: Florya Metin Oktay Facilities; Referee: Uğurcan Şanlı; Assistant referees: Kenan Gürsel, Engin Altınışık; Fourth official: Ayşenur Akçay

12 March 2026 21	ALG Spor	0–3 (w/o)	Galatasaray Gain
		Report

17 March 2026 22	Galatasaray Gain	3–0	Ünye Kadın SK	Şenlikköy, Bakırköy, Istanbul
13:00 TRT (UTC+3)	Ngah 40'; Arpacı 54' (o.g.); Öztürk 79'	Report 1 Report 2		Stadium: Florya Metin Oktay Facilities; Referee: Efe Çetin; Assistant referees: Furkan Olcaş, Nihat Can Kabataş; Fourth official: Mehmet Kaan Ertuğrul

28 March 2026 23	Beşiktaş	4–4	Galatasaray Gain	Şişli, Istanbul
13:00 TRT (UTC+3)	Komé 3'; Acar 81'; Manya 83'; Öztürk 90+4', (yellow card) 90+4'; Aleksić (yellow card) 90+5'	Report 1 Report 2	Ngah 16', 52'; Topçu 42'; Cintra 70'; Hickelsberger (yellow card) 90+1'	Stadium: Fulya Hakkı Yeten Facility; Referee: Hatem Yarar; Assistant referees: Nimet Altunkıran Gergin, Neslihan Koç; Fourth official: Cihat Şamil Ulutaş

3 April 2026 24	Galatasaray Gain	8–0	Prolift Giresun Sanayispor	Şenlikköy, Bakırköy, Istanbul
13:00 TRT (UTC+3)	Ngah 18', 44', 65'; Cintra 20'; Keleş 22' (o.g.); Topçu 28'; Cumert 36'; Pekel 55'	Report 1 Report 2		Stadium: Florya Metin Oktay Facilities; Referee: Ertuğrul Yolcu; Assistant referees: Elif Ayvaz, Merve Güller; Fourth official: Rauf Ergenekon

22 April 2026 25	Bornova Hitab Spor	0–3 (w/o)	Galatasaray Gain
		Report

27 April 2026 26	Galatasaray Gain	3–2	Fenerbahçe Arsavev	Şenlikköy, Bakırköy, Istanbul
13:00 TRT (UTC+3)	Chang 19', (yellow card) 37'; Altıntaş (yellow card) 31'; Hickelsberger (yellow card) 75'; Demehin 88'; Ngah 90'	Report 1 Report 2	Stašková 41', 46'; Kaya (yellow card) 77'; Şeker (yellow card) 85'	Stadium: Florya Metin Oktay Facilities; Referee: Levent Buğra Vartemel; Assistant referees: Nimet Altunkıran Gergin, Semra Bulut; Fourth official: Özge Tiraki

2 May 2026 27	Hakkarigücü Spor	1–1	Galatasaray Gain	Hakkâri
13:00 TRT (UTC+3)	Owusuaa 49', (red card) 90+4'; Sawadogo (yellow card) 89'	Report 1 Report 2	Cintra 22'; Demehin (red card) 87'; Almeida (yellow card) 90+4'	Stadium: Merzan Şehir Stadı; Referee: Umut Nasrullah Özhelvacı; Assistant referees: Rümeysa Gök, Sevcan Soğukbulak; Fourth official: Helin Abı

10 May 2026 28	Galatasaray Gain	0–2	Trabzonspor	Şenlikköy, Bakırköy, Istanbul
13:00 TRT (UTC+3)	Cumert (yellow card) 20'; Karataş (yellow card) 60'; Öztürk (yellow card) 89'	Report 1 Report 2	Küçük 10', (yellow card) 85'; Oleszkiewicz (yellow card) 81', (goal) 90+6'	Stadium: Florya Metin Oktay Facilities; Referee: Mücahit Karakurt; Assistant referees: Hasan Çiftçi, Muhammed Şamil Göçgün; Fourth official: Mahmut Mert İpek

17 May 2026 29	Amed Sportif Faaliyetler	0–2	Galatasaray Gain	Diyarbakır
14:00 TRT (UTC+3)		Report 1 Report 2	Topçu 23'; Altıntaş (yellow card) 50'; Ngah 75'	Stadium: Seyrantepe 1 Nolu Çim Saha; Referee: Fatih Karakurt; Assistant referees: Mehmet Özer, Orhan Timurtaş; Fourth official: Seçil Özdemir Başdaş

24 May 2026 30	Galatasaray Gain	3–0 (w/o)	Beylerbeyi Spor Kulübü
		Report

== Statistics ==
Italic written players transferred/loaned out during the season.

=== Appearances and goals ===
No.	Pos	Nat	Player	Total		Super League	
No.	Pos	Nat	Player	Apps	Goals	Apps	Goals
Goalkeepers
1	GK	(Sweden) SWE	Angel Mukasa	16	0	16	0
12	GK	(Italy) ITA	Roberta Aprile	8	0	8	0
26	GK	(Turkey) TUR	Esra Yarım	0	0	0	0
Defenders
4	DF	(Nigeria) NGA	Oluwatosin Demehin	21	1	21	1
5	DF	(Turkey) TUR	Eda Karataş	22	2	22	2
23	DF	(Turkey) TUR	Narin Yakut	2	0	2	0
75	DF	(Turkey) TUR	Kezban Tağ	23	0	23	0
Midfielders
6	MF	(South Korea) KOR	Jang Chang	24	3	24	3
13	MF	(China) CHN	Yang Lina	5	0	5	0
15	MF	(Turkey) TUR	Berra Pekgöz	6	1	6	1
16	MF	(Turkey) TUR	Ebru Topçu	21	8	21	8
18	MF	(Austria) AUT	Julia Hickelsberger	22	5	22	5
22	MF	(Turkey) TUR	Ecem Cumert	19	1	19	1
24	MF	(Turkey) TUR	Arzu Akkurt	10	0	10	0
27	MF	(Netherlands) NED	Dana Foederer	11	0	11	0
55	MF	(Turkey) TUR	Elif Keskin	20	0	20	0
77	MF	(Turkey) TUR	İrem Eren	12	1	12	1
Forwards
8	FW	(Brazil) BRA	Marta Cintra	22	8	22	8
9	FW	(Brazil) BRA	Vitória Almeida	5	0	5	0
10	FW	(Turkey) TUR	Melike Pekel	14	5	14	5
11	FW	(Cameroon) CMR	Marie Ngah	24	27	24	27
71	FW	(Turkey) TUR	Melike Öztürk	17	4	17	4
99	FW	(Turkey) TUR	Benan Altıntaş	20	1	20	1
Players transferred/loaned out during the season
7	MF	(France) FRA	Lalia Storti	10	0	10	0
9	FW	(Turkey) TUR	Elanur Laçın	7	4	7	4
19	FW	(Italy) ITA	Valentina Giacinti	13	14	13	14

Last updated: 24 May 2026.
Source: TFF.org

- The match against Yüksekova played on April 22, 2026, is not included in the statistics because the information was not entered by the Turkish Football Federation (TFF).

=== Goalscorers ===
Rank	No.	Pos.	Nat.	Name	Super League	Total
1	11	FW	(Cameroon)	Marie Ngah	27	27
2	19	FW	(Italy)	Valentina Giacinti	14	14
3	8	FW	(Brazil)	Marta Cintra	9	9
4	16	MF	(Turkey)	Ebru Topçu	8	8
5	10	FW	(Turkey)	Melike Pekel	5	5
5	18	MF	(Austria)	Julia Hickelsberger	5	5
6	9	FW	(Turkey)	Elanur Laçın	4	4
6	71	FW	(Turkey)	Melike Öztürk	4	4
7	6	MF	(South Korea)	Jang Chang	3	3
8	5	DF	(Turkey)	Eda Karataş	2	2
9	4	DF	(Nigeria)	Oluwatosin Demehin	1	1
9	15	MF	(Turkey)	Berra Pekgöz	1	1
9	22	MF	(Turkey)	Ecem Cumert	1	1
9	77	MF	(Turkey)	İrem Eren	1	1
9	99	FW	(Turkey)	Benan Altıntaş	1	1
Own goals					3	3
Awarded					15	15
Totals					104	104

Last updated: 24 May 2026.
Source: TFF.org

=== Hat-tricks ===
Player	Against	Result	Date	Competition	Ref
(Cameroon) Marie Ngah^{5}	ALG Spor	17–0 (H)	15 October 2025	Super League	
(Italy) Valentina Giacinti^{4}	ALG Spor	17–0 (H)	15 October 2025	Super League	
(Cameroon) Marie Ngah	Fatih Vatan Spor	9–0 (H)	1 February 2026	Super League	
(Cameroon) Marie Ngah	Prolift Giresun Sanayispor	8–0 (H)	3 April 2026	Super League	

(H) – Home; (A) – Away
^{5} Player scored five goals
^{4} Player scored four goals

=== Clean sheets ===
Rank	No.	Pos.	Nat.	Name	Super League	Total
1	1	GK	(Sweden)	Angel Mukasa	8	8
2	12	GK	(Italy)	Roberta Aprile	5	5
3	26	GK	(Turkey)	Esra Yarım	–	–
Totals					13	13

Last updated: 26 May 2026.
Source: TFF.org

=== Disciplinary records ===
No.	Pos.	Nat.	Name	Super League			Total		
No.	Pos.	Nat.	Name	Booked	(yellow card) (yellow-red card)	Sent off (straight red)	Booked	(yellow card) (yellow-red card)	Sent off (straight red)
4	DF	(Nigeria)	Oluwatosin Demehin	4	0	1	4	0	1
5	DF	(Turkey)	Eda Karataş	5	0	0	5	0	0
6	MF	(South Korea)	Jang Chang	2	0	0	2	0	0
7	MF	(France)	Lalia Storti	2	0	0	2	0	0
8	FW	(Brazil)	Marta Cintra	1	0	0	1	0	0
9	FW	(Turkey)	Elanur Laçın	1	0	0	1	0	0
9	FW	(Brazil)	Vitória Almeida	1	0	0	1	0	0
18	MF	(Austria)	Julia Hickelsberger	5	0	0	5	0	0
19	FW	(Italy)	Valentina Giacinti	1	0	0	1	0	0
22	MF	(Turkey)	Ecem Cumert	3	0	0	3	0	0
24	MF	(Turkey)	Arzu Akkurt	1	0	0	1	0	0
55	MF	(Turkey)	Elif Keskin	2	0	0	2	0	0
71	FW	(Turkey)	Melike Öztürk	4	0	0	4	0	0
99	FW	(Turkey)	Benan Altıntaş	4	0	0	4	0	0
Totals				36	0	1	36	0	1

Last updated: 24 May 2026.
Source: TFF.org

- The match against Yüksekova played on April 22, 2026, is not included in the statistics because the information was not entered by the Turkish Football Federation (TFF).

=== Game as captain ===
Rank	No.	Pos.	Nat.	Name	Super League	Total
1	16	MF	(Turkey)	Ebru Topçu	22	22
2	5	DF	(Turkey)	Eda Karataş	1	1
2	18	MF	(Austria)	Julia Hickelsberger	1	1
2	22	MF	(Turkey)	Ecem Cumert	1	1
Totals					25	25

Last updated: 26 May 2026.
Source: TFF.org
