= Galatasaray S.K. (women's football) in European football =

Turkish club in European football

Galatasaray in European football includes the games which are played by Galatasaray in UEFA organizations.

== Overall record ==
=== By competition ===
As of 2 March 2026

Competition	Pld	W	D	L	GF	GA	GD	W%
UEFA Women's Champions League	10	3	1	6	14	32	−18	30.00
Total	10	3	1	6	14	32	−18	30.00

Legend: Pld = Matches played. W= Wins. D = Draws. L = Losses. GF = Goals For. GA = Goals Against. GD = Goal Difference. W% = Win percentage.

=== By club/country ===
As of 2 March 2026

Country	Club	Pld	W	D	L	GF	GA	GD
Luxembourg	Racing Union	1	1	0	0	4	1	+3
Subtotal		1	1	0	0	4	1	+3
Kazakhstan	BIIK Shymkent	1	1	0	0	5	0	+5
Subtotal		1	1	0	0	5	0	+5
Czech Republic	Slavia Prague	2	1	1	0	4	3	+1
Subtotal		2	1	1	0	4	3	+1
France	Lyon	2	0	0	2	0	9	–9
Subtotal		2	0	0	2	0	9	–9
Italy	Roma	2	0	0	2	1	9	–8
Subtotal		2	0	0	2	1	9	–8
Germany	VfL Wolfsburg	2	0	0	2	0	10	–10
Subtotal		2	0	0	2	0	10	–10
Total		10	3	1	6	14	32	–18

== Matches ==
Event	Stage	Date	Venue	Opponent	Result	Scorers	Ref.
2024–25	Qualifying round 1 Semi-finals	4 September 2024	Stade Achille Hammerel, Luxembourg City	(Luxembourg) Racing Union	4–1	Topçu, Stašková, Karabulut, Usme.	
2024–25	Qualifying round 1 Final	7 September 2024	Stade Achille Hammerel, Luxembourg City	(Kazakhstan) BIIK Shymkent	5–0	Hapsatou (3), Stašková, Usme.	
2024–25	Qualifying round 2	19 September 2024	(Turkey) Esenyurt Necmi Kadıoğlu Stadium, Istanbul	(Czech Republic) Slavia Prague	2–2	Stašková (2).	
2024–25	Qualifying round 2	25 September 2024	(Czech Republic) Fortuna Arena, Prague	(Czech Republic) Slavia Prague	2–1 (a.e.t.)	Karabulut, Parlak.	
2024–25	Group A	8 October 2024	(France) Parc Olympique Lyonnais, Décines-Charpieu	(France) Lyon	0–3		
2024–25	Group A	17 October 2024	(Turkey) Atatürk Olympic Stadium, Istanbul	(Italy) Roma	1–6	Stašková.	
2024–25	Group A	13 November 2024	(Turkey) Atatürk Olympic Stadium, Istanbul	(Germany) VfL Wolfsburg	0–5		
2024–25	Group A	20 November 2024	(Germany) AOK Stadion, Wolfsburg	(Germany) VfL Wolfsburg	0–5		
2024–25	Group A	11 December 2024	(Turkey) Atatürk Olympic Stadium, Istanbul	(France) Lyon	0–6		
2024–25	Group A	17 December 2024	(Italy) Stadio Tre Fontane, Rome	(Italy) Roma	0–3		

== Statistics ==
As of 2 March 2026

=== Appearances ===
Rank	Player	Years	UCL	Total	Ref.
1	(Czech Republic) Andrea Stašková	2024–2025	10	10	
2	(Senegal) Hapsatou Malado Diallo	2024–2025	10	10	
3	(Turkey) Arzu Karabulut	2024–2025	10	10	
4	(Colombia) Catalina Usme	2024–2025	10	10	
5	(Turkey) Gamze Nur Yaman	2022–2025	10	10	
6	(Turkey) Eda Karataş	2023–present	10	10	
7	(Turkey) Kristina Bakarandze	2022–2025	10	10	
8	(Turkey) Ebru Topçu	2022–present	8	8	
9	(Turkey) Emine Ecem Esen	2022–2025	8	8	
10	(Turkey) Arzu Akkurt	2021–present	8	8	

=== Goalscorers ===
Rank	Player	Years	UCL	Total	Ref.
1	(Czech Republic) Andrea Stašková	2024–2025	5	5	
2	(Senegal) Hapsatou Malado Diallo	2024–2025	3	3	
3	(Turkey) Arzu Karabulut	2024–2025	2	2	
4	(Colombia) Catalina Usme	2024–2025	2	2	
5	(Turkey) Ebru Topçu	2022–present	1	1	
6	(Turkey) Nazlıcan Parlak	2023–2025	1	1	
