= Alma Krajnić =

Bosnian footballer (born 2002)

Personal information
- Date of birth: 11 December 2002 (age 23)
- Position: Forward

Team information
- Current team: Giresun Sanayi
- Number: 11

Senior career*
Years	Team	Apps	(Gls)
2018–2025	SFK 2000 Sarajevo		
2025–	Giresun Sanayi	2	(0)

International career
2018	Bosnia and Herzegovina U-17		
2019	Bosnia and Herzegovina U-19		
2023	Bosnia and Herzegovina		
- * Club domestic league appearances and goals as of 5 October 2025

Alma Krajnić (born 11 December 2002) is a Bosnian footballer who plays as a forward for Giresun Sanayi in the Turkish Super League, and is a member of the Bosnia and Herzegovina women's national team.

== Personal life ==
Alma Krajnić was born in Bosnia Herzegovina on 11 December 2002.

== Club career ==
Between 2018 and 2025, Krajnić played for SFK 2000 Sarajevo in her country. She took part at the UEFA Women's Champions League qualifying rounds of 2022–23, 2023–24 and 2024–25.

In August 2025, she moved to Turkey, and signed with Giresun Sanayi, which was recently promoted to the Turkish Super League.

== International career ==
Krajnić was part of the Bosnia and Herzegovina U-17 team, and played at the 2019 UEFA Women's Under-17 Championship qualification.She scored two goals.

As oart of the Bosnia and Herzegovina U-19 team, she played at the 2020 UEFA Women's Under-19 Championship qualification, and scored one goal.

She is a member of the Bosnia and Herzegovina national team. She took part at the 2023–24 UEFA Women's Nations League B matches.

== Honours ==
Bosnia and Herzegovina Women's Premier League

SFK 2000 Sarajevo
Champions (7): 2018–19, 2019–20, 2020–21, 2021–22, 2022–23, 2023–24, 2024–25
