= Patrícia Morais =

Portuguese footballer (born 1992)

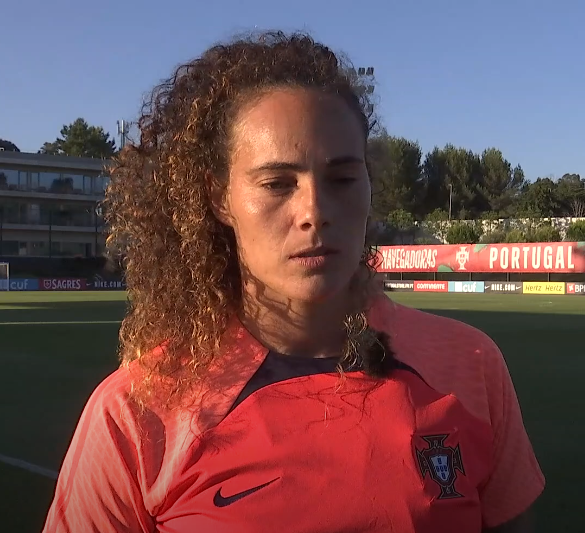
- Morais in 2023

Personal information
- Full name: Patrícia Isabel Sousa Barros Morais
- Date of birth: 17 June 1992 (age 34)
- Place of birth: Lisbon, Portugal
- Height: 1.78 m (5 ft 10 in)
- Position: Goalkeeper

Team information
- Current team: Galatasaray
- Number: 92

Senior career*
Years	Team	Apps	(Gls)
–2013	SU 1º de Dezembro		
2014	GDC A-dos-Francos		
2014–2015	Yzeure	19	(0)
2015–2016	Albi	17	(0)
2016–2021	Sporting CP	66	(0)
2021–2026	Braga	79	(0)
2026–	Galatasaray	0	(0)

International career^{‡}
2008–2011	Portugal U19	16	(0)
2011–	Portugal	100	(0)
- * Club domestic league appearances and goals as of 10 June 2025 ‡ National team caps and goals as of 12 July 2025

Patrícia Isabel Sousa Barros Morais (born 17 June 1992) is a Portuguese professional footballer who plays as a goalkeeper for Turkish Women's Football Super League club Galatasaray and the Portugal national team.

== Club career ==
On July 6, 2026, she signed a contract with the Turkish giant Galatasaray.

== International career ==
On 30 May 2023, she was included in the 23-player squad for the 2023 FIFA Women's World Cup.

On 24 June 2025, Morais was called up to the Portugal squad for the UEFA Women's Euro 2025. On 11 July, she received her 100th cap in a 2–1 defeat to Belgium.
