= Benan Altıntaş =

Turkish footballer (born 2001)

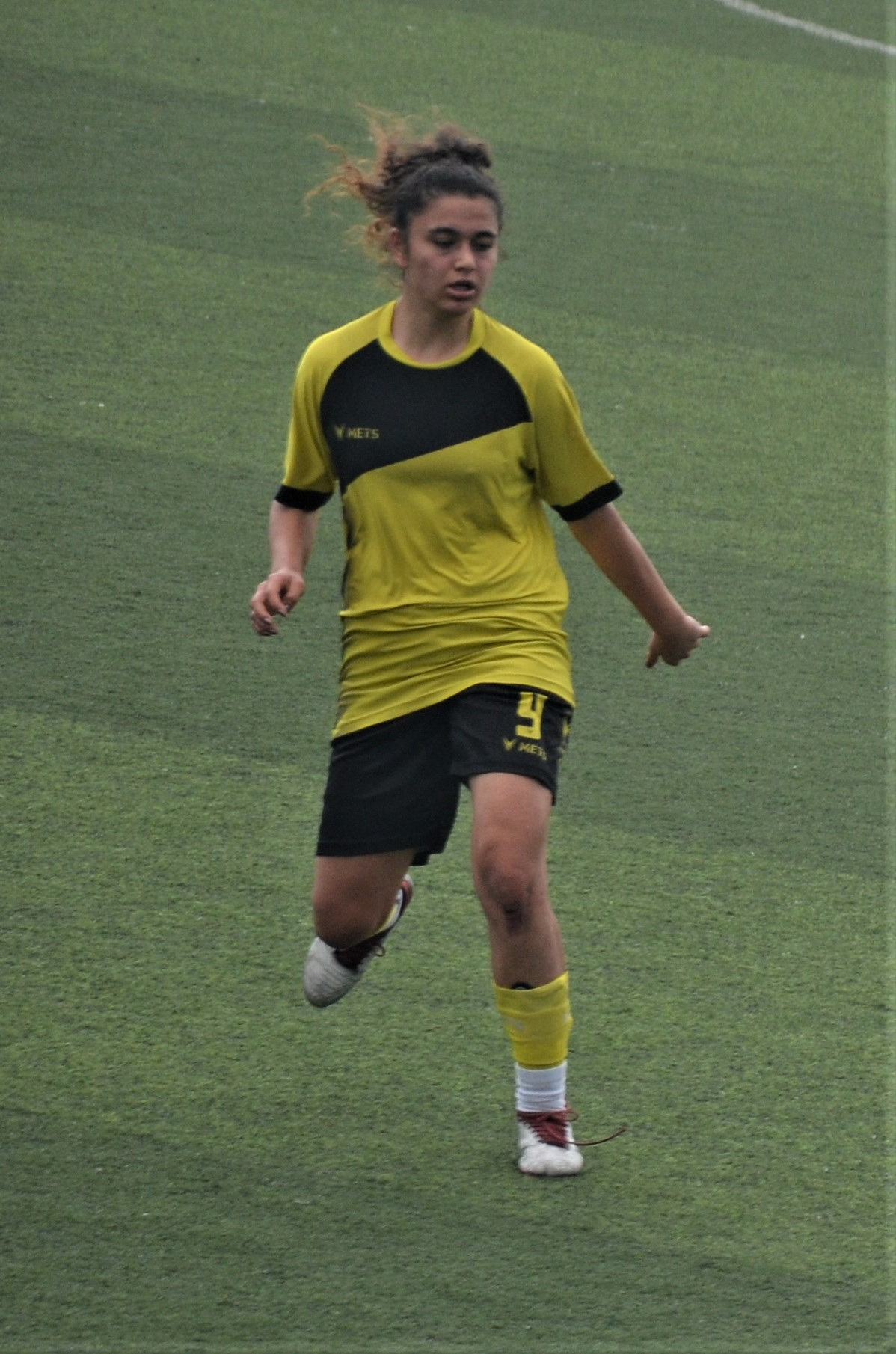
- Benan Altıntaş of Fomget Gençlik ve Spor (October 2019)

Personal information
- Date of birth: 10 November 2001 (age 24)
- Place of birth: Turkey
- Position: Forward

Team information
- Current team: Trabzonspor

Senior career*
Years	Team	Apps	(Gls)
2016–2023	Fomget Gençlik ve Spor	93	(114)
2023–2026	Galatasaray	30	(2)
2026–	Trabzonspor	0	(0)

International career^{‡}
2017	Turkey U-17	15	(5)
2018	Turkey U-19	2	(0)
2021–	Turkey	4	(1)
- * Club domestic league appearances and goals as of 31 July 2025 ‡ National team caps and goals as of 26 October 2021

Benan Altıntaş (born 10 November 2001) is a Turkish women's football forward, who plays for Turkcell Women's Football Super League club Trabzonspor, and the Turkey women's national team.

== Club career ==
=== Fomget Gençlik ve Spor ===
Altıntaş started her career entering the Ankara-based club Fomget Gençlik ve Spor in 2016. She played her first match in the 2016-17 Turkish Women's Third Football League on 13 November 2016. At the end of the season, she enjoyed her team's promotion the Second League. At the end of the 2018–19 season, her team became champion and was promoted to the Fşrst League.

=== Galatasaray ===
She signed a one-year contract with Galatasaray on 4 August 2023.

She signed a new 1-year contract with Galatasaray on July 31, 2025.

== International career ==
Altıntaş was admitted to the Turkey girls' U-17 team, and debuted internationally at the UEFA Development Tournament against Russia on 12 May 2017. She participated at the 2018 UEFA Women's Under-17 Championship qualification - Group 7 matches. She capped in 12 matches and scored four goals in total for the Turkey U-17 team..

In 2018, she was called up to the Turkey U-19 team. She played in two friendly matches.

She became a member of the Turkey women's national team in the friendly match on 14 June 2021.

== International goals ==
No.	Date	Venue	Opponent	Score	Result	Competition
1.	12 July 2021	Elbasan Arena, Elbasan, Albania	Albania	1–1	2–1	Friendly

== Social activity ==
On 12 June 2021, the World Day Against Child Labour, Altıntaş joined with some of her teammates a social activity launched on the social media by the Turkish "World Academy of Local Government and Democracy" (WALD) (Turkish: Dünya Yerel Yönetim ve Demokrasi Akademisi) in cooperation with the Turkish Football Federation.

== Career statistics ==
As of match played 6 November 2022

Club	Season	League			Continental		National		Total	
Club	Season	Division	Apps	Goals	Apps	Goals	Apps	Goals	Apps	Goals
Ankara BB Fomget GS	2016–17	Third League Gr. 4	24	54	–	–	3	0	27	54
Ankara BB Fomget GS	2017–18	Second League Gr. B	17	17	–	–	12	5	29	22
Ankara BB Fomget GS	2018–19	Second League	25	28	–	–	2	0	27	28
Ankara BB Fomget GS	2019-20	First League	16	11	–	–	0	0	16	11
Ankara BB Fomget GS	2020-21	Women's League	6	2	–	–	0	0	6	2
Ankara BB Fomget GS	2021-22	Super League	1	1	–	–	4	1	5	2
Ankara BB Fomget GS	2022-23	Super League	4	1	–	–	0	0	4	1
Ankara BB Fomget GS	Total		93	114	–	–	21	6	114	120
Career total			93	114	-	-	21	6	114	120

== Honours ==
Turkish Women's Second League

Fomget Gençlik ve Spor
Winners (1): 2018-19
Third places (1): 2017-18

Galatasaray
Winners (1): 2023–24

Turkish Women's Third League

Fomget Gençlik ve Spor
Winners (1): 2016-17
