= Julia Hickelsberger =

Austrian footballer

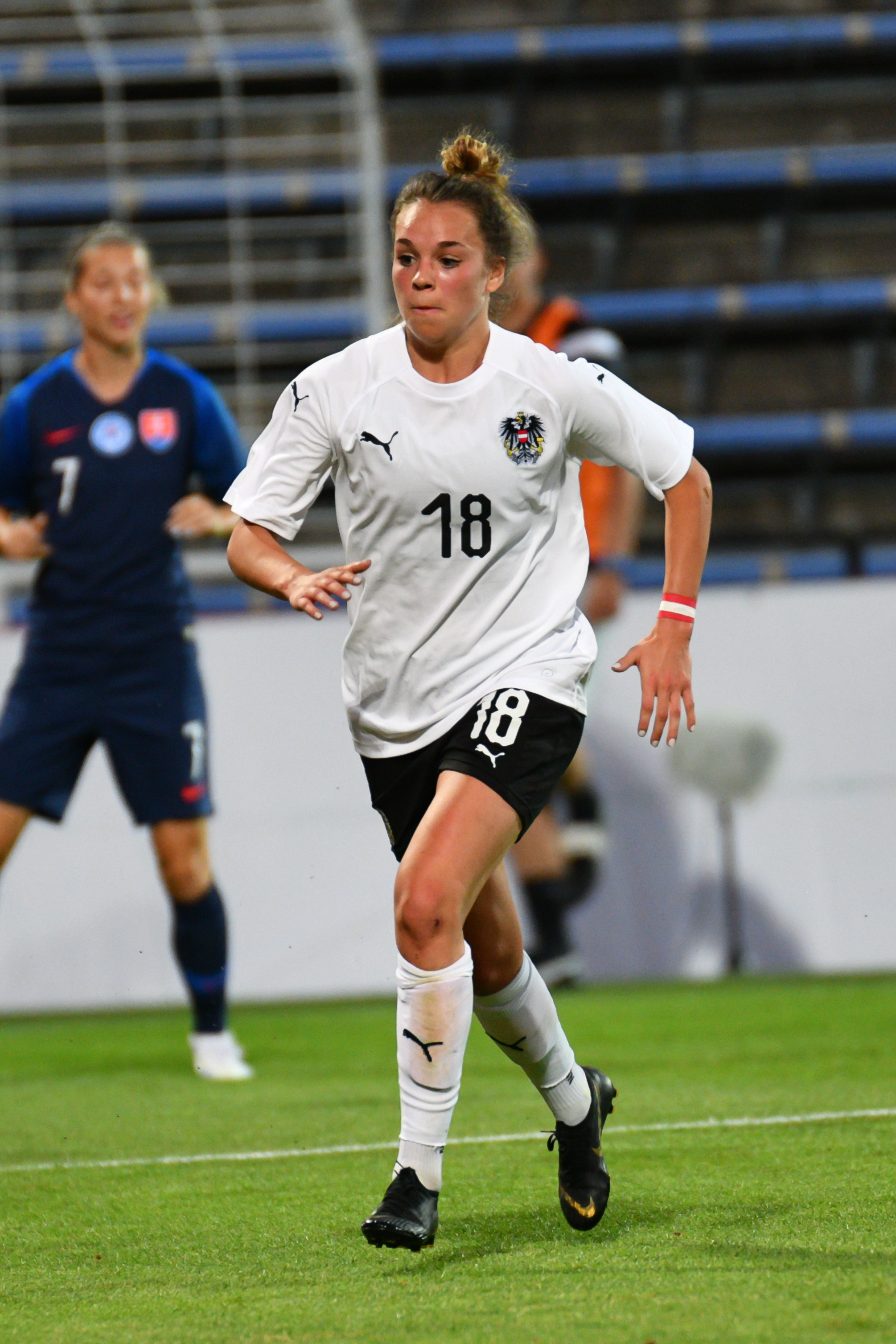

Personal information
- Full name: Julia Hickelsberger-Füller
- Date of birth: 1 August 1999 (age 27)
- Height: 1.71 m (5 ft 7 in)
- Position: Midfielder

Team information
- Current team: PSV Eindhoven

Youth career
- 2008–2014: Neulengbach

Senior career*
Years	Team	Apps	(Gls)
2014–2018	Neulengbach		
2019–2022	SKN St. Pölten	10	(7)
2022–2025	TSG Hoffenheim	43	(9)
2025–2026	Galatasaray	22	(5)
2006–	PSV Eindhoven	0	(0)

International career^{‡}
2016–2017	Austria U19	5	(1)
2019–	Austria	53	(9)
- * Club domestic league appearances and goals as of 21 May 2025 ‡ National team caps and goals as of 9 June 2026

Julia Hickelsberger-Füller (born 1 August 1999), known as Julia Hickelsberger, is an Austrian footballer who plays as a midfielder for Turkish Women's Football Super League club Galatasaray since Summer 2025 and the Austria women's national team.

== Club career ==
On August 1, 2025, she signed a contract with the Turkish giant Galatasaray.

== International goals ==
No.	Date	Venue	Opponent	Score	Result	Competition
1.	3 September 2019	Bundesstadion Südstadt, Maria Enzersdorf, Austria	North Macedonia	2–0	3–0	UEFA Women's Euro 2022 qualifying
2.	12 November 2019	Bundesstadion Südstadt, Maria Enzersdorf, Austria	Kazakhstan	1–0	9–0	UEFA Women's Euro 2022 qualifying
3.	12 November 2019	Bundesstadion Südstadt, Maria Enzersdorf, Austria	Kazakhstan	4–0	9–0	UEFA Women's Euro 2022 qualifying
4.	12 November 2019	Bundesstadion Südstadt, Maria Enzersdorf, Austria	Kazakhstan	5–0	9–0	UEFA Women's Euro 2022 qualifying
5.	12 November 2019	Bundesstadion Südstadt, Maria Enzersdorf, Austria	Kazakhstan	9–0	9–0	UEFA Women's Euro 2022 qualifying
6.	11 November 2022	Stadio Guido Teghil, Lignano Sabbiadoro, Italy	Italy	1–0	1–0	Friendly
7.	15 November 2022	Stadion Wiener Neustadt, Wiener Neustadt, Austria	Slovakia	1–0	3–0	Friendly
8.	8 April 2025	Stadion Schnabelholz, Altach, Austria	Netherlands	1–0	1–3	2025 UEFA Women's Nations League
9.	30 May 2025	Hampden Park, Glasgow, Scotland	Scotland	1–0	1–0	2025 UEFA Women's Nations League
