= GAİN =

- Available in: Turkish, English
- Owners: Beyn Danışmanlık (2019–2023); Rams Türkiye Grubu (2023–2025); Anahat Holding A.Ş. (2025); TMSF (2025–present)
- Founder: Gözde Akpınar
- Website: www.gain.tv
- Registration: Required
- Users: 3.3 million (2023)
- Launched: 30 December 2020; 5 years ago

GAİN is a next-generation video content platform founded in 2019 under Beyn Danışmanlık, consisting of short educational and entertaining videos primarily intended for viewing on mobile devices. Appealing to users' different video-watching habits at different times, GAİN gives viewers the opportunity to create their own feeds through its AI-based algorithm and a wide range of current content. GAİN also supports independent video content creators, following a broadcasting policy that places importance on diversity of voices and original productions within the industry. As a word, it stands for Güzel Ahlak, İyi Niyet (GAİN), meaning Good Morals, Good Intentions.

== History ==
GAİN is a digital content platform based in Turkey. Founded by Gözde Akpınar, the platform launched on 30 December 2020. Initially standing out with short-form and episodic content targeting mobile users, GAİN later began producing original series, documentaries, and current affairs programs. Since its establishment, GAİN has been among the new-generation platforms operating in the field of digital broadcasting in Turkey.

The platform attracted attention by reaching 2 million users in a short period of time. GAİN became known for original productions such as "Ayak İşleri", "Hamlet", "Cezailer" and "10 Bin Adım"; it also offered international series to viewers through a collaboration with BBC Studios.

In April 2023, all shares of GAİN were acquired by Rams Türkiye Grubu, which operates in the construction and real estate sectors. Following the acquisition, Gözde Akpınar continued to serve as Chairwoman of the Board of Directors until 1 June 2023, after which she left the platform.

GAİN Medya was acquired by Anahat Holding A.Ş. and Selahattin Aydın on 21 February 2025. Selahattin Aydın also serves as Chairman of GAİN's Board of Directors.

== Investigation and appointment of a trustee ==
On 16 December 2025, an operation was conducted against GAİN Medya and its owner Anahat Holding as part of an investigation carried out by the Istanbul Chief Public Prosecutor's Office. Based on reports from MASAK, the company's Chairman of the Board Selahattin Aydın, former shareholder Berkin Kaya, and company executive Barbaros Reşat Gülcan were detained on charges of "establishing an organization for the purpose of committing a crime", "violating Law No. 7258 (illegal betting)", and "laundering assets derived from crime". While the investigation continued, the court appointed the Savings Deposit Insurance Fund (TMSF) as trustee to manage the company.
