= Jang Chang =

South Korean footballer

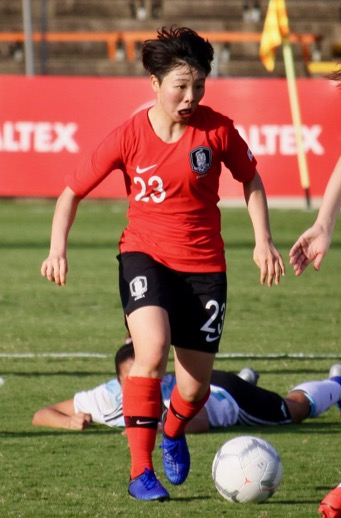
- Jang in 2019

Personal information
- Full name: Jang Chang
- Date of birth: 21 June 1996 (age 30)
- Place of birth: South Korea
- Height: 1.58 m (5 ft 2 in)
- Position: Midfielder

Team information
- Current team: Galatasaray

Senior career*
Years	Team	Apps	(Gls)
2019–2021	Seoul WFC		
2022–2025	Hyundai Steel Red Angels		
2025–	Galatasaray	17	(2)

International career
2011	South Korea U17	5	(0)
2015–2016	South Korea U20	10	(3)
2016–2023	South Korea	23	(0)
- * Club domestic league appearances and goals as of 7 March 2026

Jang Chang (Korean: 장창; born 21 June 1996) is a South Korean footballer who plays as a midfielder for Galatasaray.

== Early life ==
Jang became interested in football while in the second grade at Mungi Elementary School after her younger brother received a football as a present and they started playing together. She joined a football club in the fourth grade and was scouted by Jang Dong-jin, a coach from Shinha Elementary School in Icheon, a school known for its girls' football team. She chose to move away from home to pursue football. In 2008, while in the sixth grade, she won the top goalscorer award at the 7th Korean Women's Autumn Football Championship.

== Club career ==
Jang attended Korea University, where she played as a striker for the newly formed women's football team. Upon graduation, Jang was selected by Seoul WFC as the first pick in the 2019 WK League new player draft. She transferred to Incheon Hyundai Steel Red Angels ahead of the 2022 season.

On 15 September 2025, she moved abroad for the first time and signed a contract with Turkish club Galatasaray.

== International career ==
Jang was selected to play for South Korea in the 2015 AFC U-19 Women's Championship. The team's third-place finish secured them qualification for the 2016 U-20 Women's World Cup, where Jang again represented her country alongside six of her Korea University teammates. She received her first senior team call-up in 2016 and was the only university student to be part of the bronze medal-winning team at the 2018 Asian Games.
