= Gábor Gallai =

German footballer and manager

Personal information
- Date of birth: 21 August 1979 (age 47)
- Place of birth: Hoyerswerda, East Germany

Senior career*
| Years | Team | Apps | (Gls) |
- Hoyerswerdaer FC
- FC Zuzenhausen
- SC Olympia Neulußheim

Managerial career
- 2020–2022: TSG 1899 Hoffenheim (women)
- 2023–2024: Grasshopper (women)
- 2025–2026: Galatasaray (women)
- 2026–: SC Sand
- * Club domestic league appearances and goals

Gábor Gallai (born 21 August 1979) is a German football manager and former player.

== Managerial career ==
=== TSG 1899 Hoffenheim ===
Starting in the 2020–21 season, Gallai took over as head coach of the TSG 1899 Hoffenheim women's team, succeeding long-time incumbent Jürgen Ehrmann.

=== Grasshopper ===
After the 2023–24 winter break, he took over the women's team of Grasshopper in the Swiss Women's Super League. The team finished the qualification in fifth place and was eliminated in the quarterfinals of the playoffs. In December 2024, after one year, the club parted ways with Gallai.

=== Galatasaray ===
On 8 July 2025, Gallai signed a two–year contract with Galatasaray.

On 15 June 2026, it was announced that he parted ways with the club.

== Managerial statistics ==
As of match played 6 June 2026

Managerial record by team and tenure
| Team | Nat | From | To | Record | | | | | | | |
| Team | Nat | From | To | G | W | D | L | GF | GA | GD | Win % |
|---|---|---|---|---|---|---|---|---|---|---|---|
| TSG 1899 Hoffenheim | (Germany) | 2020 | 2022 | 0 | 0 | 0 | 0 | 0 | 0 | +0 | — |
| Grasshopper | (Switzerland) | 2023 | 2024 | 0 | 0 | 0 | 0 | 0 | 0 | +0 | — |
| Galatasaray | (Turkey) | 8 July 2025 | 15 June 2026 | 30 | 24 | 2 | 4 | 104 | 19 | +85 | 80.00 |
| SC Sand | (Germany) | 6 October 2026 | | 0 | 0 | 0 | 0 | 0 | 0 | +0 | — |
| Total | | | | 30 | 24 | 2 | 4 | 104 | 19 | +85 | 80.00 |
