= Roberta Aprile =

Italian footballer (born 2000)

Personal information
- Date of birth: 22 November 2000 (age 25)
- Place of birth: Syracuse, Sicily, Italy
- Position: Goalkeeper

Team information
- Current team: Galatasaray
- Number: 1

Senior career*
Years	Team	Apps	(Gls)
2015–2019	Pink Bari	37	(0)
2019–2021	Inter Milan	16	(0)
2021–2025	Juventus	17	(0)
2024–2025	→ Sampdoria (loan)	4	(0)
2025	→ Como (loan)	2	(0)
2025–	Galatasaray	5	(0)

International career
2016–2017	Italy U17	6	(0)
2017–2019	Italy U19	5	(0)
2023	Italy U23	0	(0)
- * Club domestic league appearances and goals

Roberta Aprile (born 22 November 2000) is an Italian footballer who plays as a goalkeeper for Galatasaray.

== Biography ==
She is the daughter of Luca Sebastiano Aprile, a former footballer, a goalkeeper like her, who made 3 appearances for Palermo in the 2001–02 Serie B season.

She has been passionate about football since a young age, joining the Polisportiva Le Formiche of Siracusa where she finds space in the women's five-a-side football team and where her performances make her gain visibility so much so that she is called up, not yet fifteen, to a training camp with the Italian futsal national team.

== Club career ==
=== Pink Bari ===
During the 2015 summer transfer window, she decided to switch disciplines and switch to 11-a-side women's football, accepting an offer from Pink Sport Time to play in Serie B the following season. In her first season with the Bari-based club, she appeared in 19 league matches plus the promotion play-off, conceding eight goals in total. She shared with her teammates the victory in the promotion play-off on May 21, 2017, played in Città Sant'Angelo, after a 1-1 draw after regular time, defeating Roma CF on penalties and celebrating the club's return to Serie A.

=== Juventus ===
After playing two seasons with Inter, sharing the role with the more experienced Chiara Marchitelli, she moved on loan to Juventus in July 2021.

=== Sampdoria (loan) ===
On July 23, 2024, she was loaned out for a season to Sampdoria, also in Serie A.

=== Como (loan) ===
On January 31, 2025, her loan to the Ligurian club was terminated and, at the same time, it was announced that she would join Como on loan until the end of the season.

=== Galatasaray ===
On September 8, 2025, she signed a contract with the Turkish giant Galatasaray.

== International career ==
Aprile was evaluated by Under-17 national team coach Rita Guarino at a training camp in late 2016, and later selected for the double friendly match against Norway on 13 and 15 January. Included in the squad for the elite round of qualification for the 2017 European Championship in the Czech Republic, she did not play due to the team’s failure to reach the final stage.

In 2017, she advanced to the Under-19 team during the qualifiers for the European Championship in Switzerland, debuting on 16 October as a starter in an 8–0 win over Moldova. Although included in the squad for the final tournament, coach Enrico Sbardella preferred Nicole Lauria, and Aprile’s appearance during the qualifiers remained her only cap.

Sbardella confirmed his trust in her for the next cycle, the 2019 edition in Scotland, and with Lauria aged out, Aprile saw more playing time. She shared duties with Camilla Forcinella, making 4 appearances—two in the first round, where Italy topped the group undefeated, and two in the elite round, where Italy failed to qualify after a 2–0 defeat to England women's national under-19 football team.

Later, Aprile was called up both to the Under-23 team by coach Jacopo Leandri and to the senior national team by Milena Bertolini for the qualifying matches for Euro 2022 in England, serving as third-choice goalkeeper behind Laura Giuliani and Francesca Durante. Though called up three times—beginning with the match against Bosnia and Herzohovine —she was never fielded by coach Bertolini.

In September 2023, Aprile returned to the national team setup, being selected by new coach Andrea Soncin for the opening matches of the 2023–24 UEFA Women's Nations League against Switzerland and Sweden.
