= Galatasaray S.K. (women's football) =

Galatasaray Spor Kulübü
- Full name: Galatasaray Spor Kulübü (Galatasaray Sports Club)
- Nicknames: Dişi Aslanlar (The Lionesses); Sarı Kırmızılılar (The Yellow Reds); Cimbom (The Cimbom)
- Short name: GS
- Founded: 2011; 15 years ago
- Ground: Domestic matches: Florya Metin Oktay Facilities; International matches: Atatürk Olympic Stadium
- President: Dursun Özbek
- Head coach: (Germany) (Turkey) Şaban Uzun
- League: Super League
- 2025–26: Super League, 3rd of 16
- Website: https://www.galatasaray.org/sl/galatasaray-kadin-futbol-takimi/46

Galatasaray Women's Football (Turkish: Galatasaray Kadın Futbol Takımı) is a women's football section of Galatasaray S.K., a major sports club in Istanbul, Turkey.

== History ==
=== Foundation years ===
Galatasaray S.K. opened initially a football school for girls of age category 6–12 at its Florya Metin Oktay Facilities (Turkish: Florya Kız Futbol Okulu) in the beginning of 2011. The training of girls was conducted by women trainers on weekends.

The women's football side of Galatasaray S.K. was founded in 2011. It consisted in age categories of little girls, cadets and junior girls. It was an important place in the infrastructure with the female players it has trained, The little girls became champion in the Istanbul Girls' U-13 League ("İstanbul Minik Kızlar Futbol Ligi") in 2015, the cadets played in the finals of the Turkish Girls' U-15 Championship ("Türkiye Yıldız Kızlar Futbol Şampiyonası"), and the juniors advanced to the second round of the Turkish Girls' U-17 Championship ("Türkiye Genç Kızlar Futbol Şampiyonası"). Some members of the Yellow*Reds were admitted to the Turkey girls' national U-17 team.

=== Closing year ===
The umbrella club's management announced the closure of the women's football department, which was active four years long, with effect of end September 2016 due to downsizing measures caused by financial issues.

=== Senior Women's Team ===
On 18 September 2021, the senior women's football team was founded. Nurcan Çelik was appointed as the first coach.

In the 2022-23 Super League season, the team played semi-finals in the play-offs, losing to Fenerbahçe S.K.. The team finished the 2023-24 Super League season as champion.

== Previous names ==
Period	Previous names	Ref.
2011–2016	Galatasaray	–
2021–2022	Galatasaray Hepsiburada	
2022–2025	Galatasaray Petrol Ofisi	
2025–2026	Galatasaray GAİN	
2026–present	Galatasaray	–

== Stadium ==
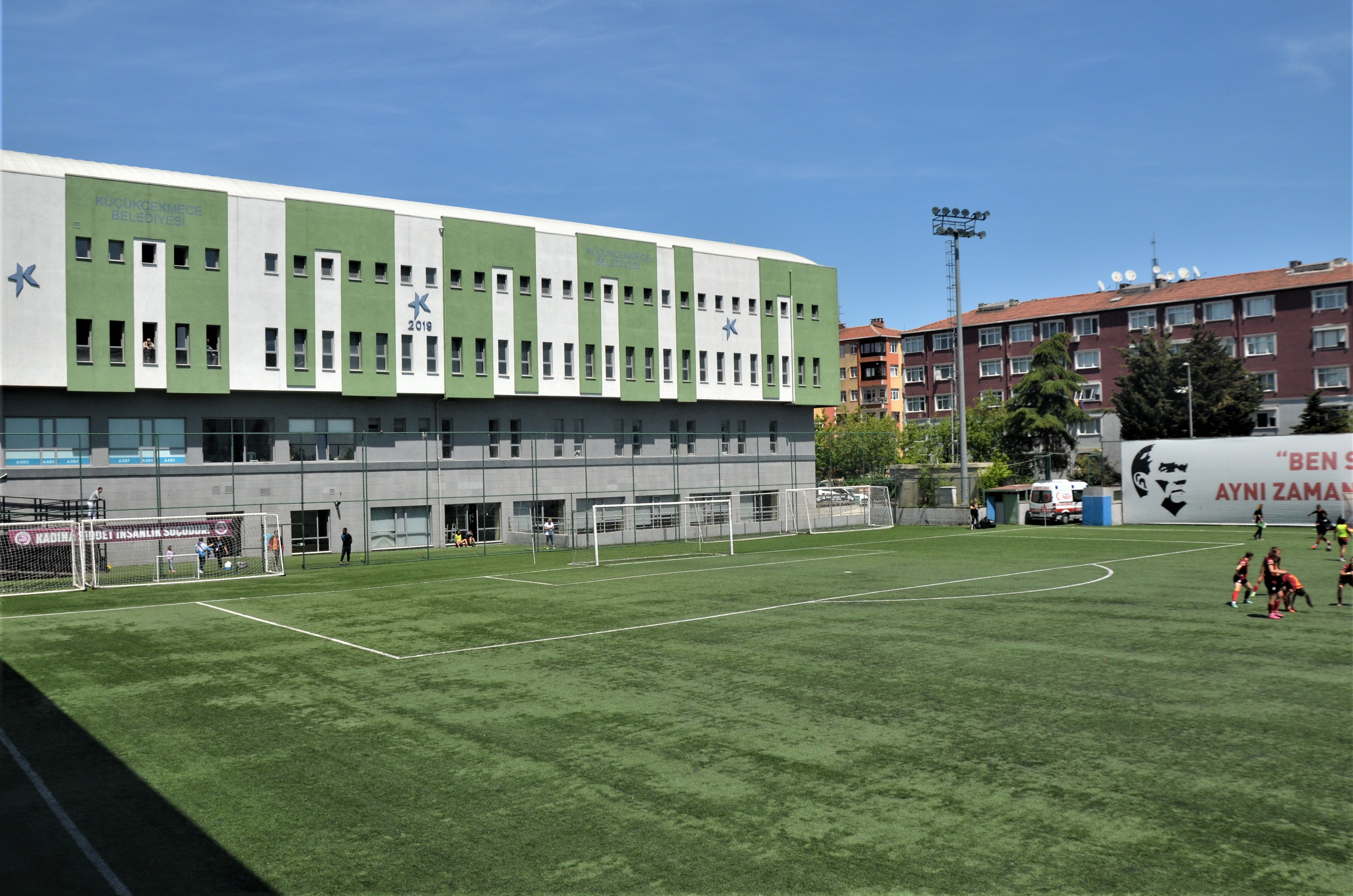
Yeşilova Kemal Aktaş Stadium.

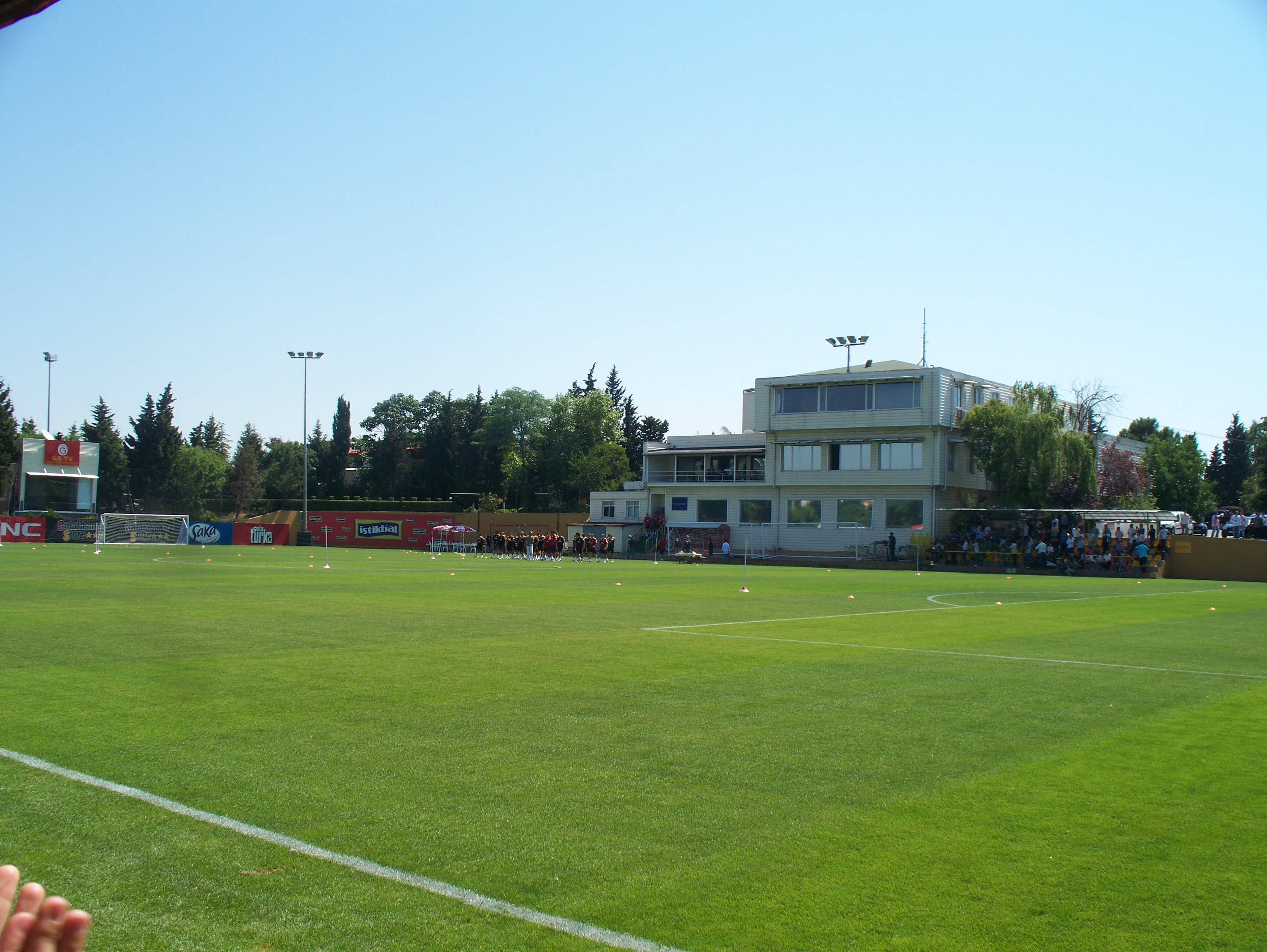
Florya Metin Oktay Facilities.

The team played their home matches in the 2021-2022 season at Yeşilova Kemal Aktaş Stadium situated in Küçükçekmece district of Istanbul Province. In the 2022-23 season, they play the home matches at the club-owned training stadium of Florya Metin Oktay Facilities located in the Florya neighborhood of Bakırköy district in Istanbul.

== Statistics ==
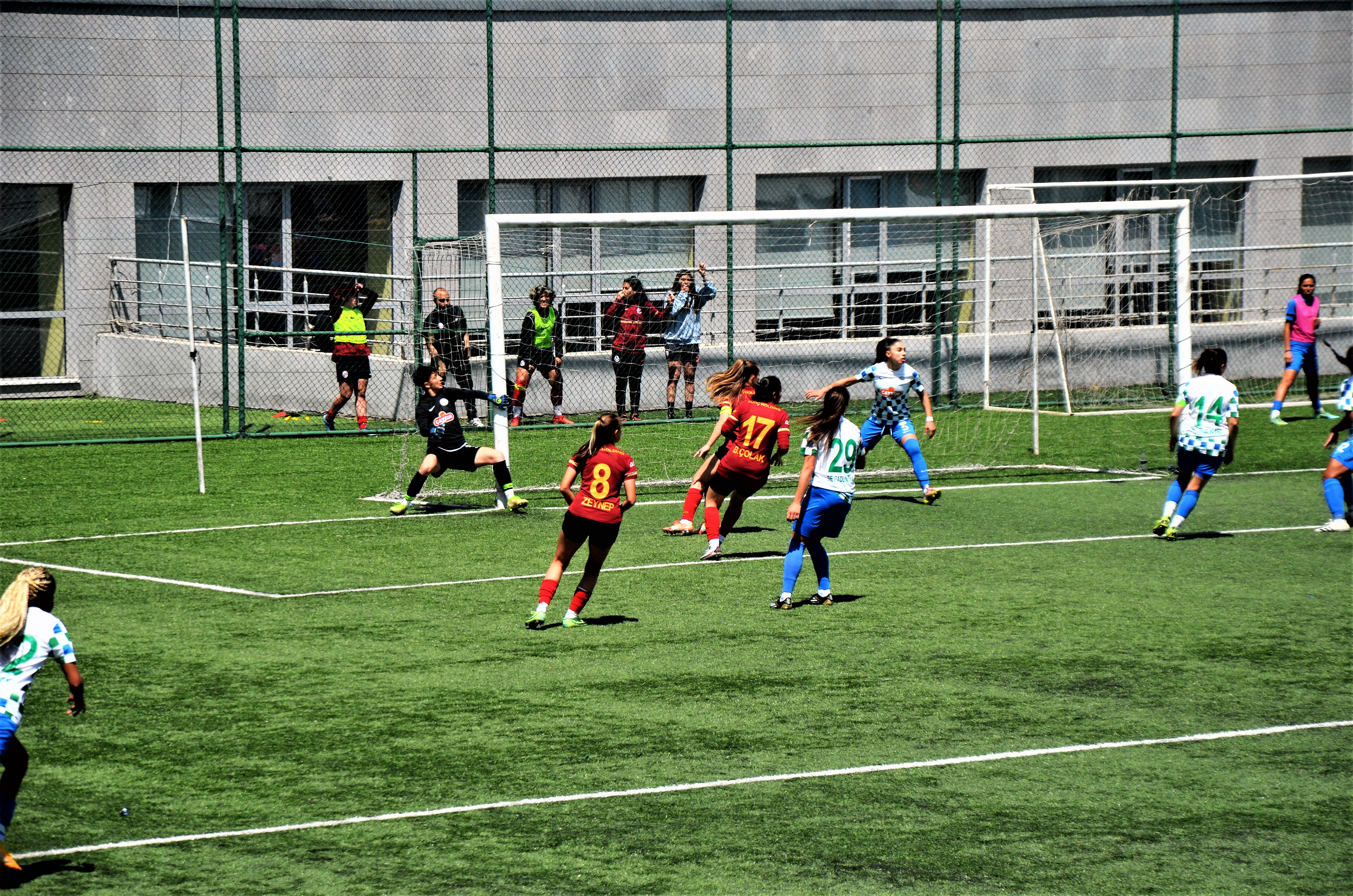
Galatasaray S.K. (red/yellow) vs Çaykur Rizespor (white/blue) in the 2021-22 Turkish Women's Football Super League's home match.

As of 1 June 2026

Season	League	Pos. (Gr.)	Play-offs	Pld	W	D	L	GF	GA	GD	Pts.
2021–22	Super League	6th (B)	—	22	8	5	9	35	31	+4	29
2022–23	Super League	1st (B)	Semifinalist	18	7	0	1	84	9	+75	51
2023–24	Super League	1st	—	30	23	2	5	71	29	+42	71
2024–25	Super League	4th	—	26	15	5	6	73	33	+40	50
2025–26	Super League	3rd	—	30	24	2	4	104	19	+85	74
2026–27	Super League	—	—	—	—	—	—	—	—	—	—
Green marks a season followed by promotion, red a season followed by relegation.

- (^{a}): Season in progress

=== See also ===
- Galatasaray S.K. (women's football) in European football

== Current squad ==
As of 22 September 2026

No.	Pos.	Nat.	Player	Since	Date of birth (Age)	Signed from
Goalkeepers
1	GK	(Italy)	Roberta Aprile	2025	22 November 2000 (age 25)	(Italy) Como
26	GK	(Turkey)	Esra Yarım	2024	4 January 2008 (age 18)	(Turkey) Eskişehir Büyükşehir Gençlik ve Spor Kulübü
92	GK	(Portugal)	Patrícia Morais	2026	17 June 1992 (age 34)	(Portugal) Braga
Defenders
5	DF	(Turkey)	Eda Karataş	2023	15 June 1995 (age 31)	(Turkey) ALG Spor
11	DF	(Greece)	Eleni Markou	2026	29 March 1995 (age 31)	(Germany) Eintracht Frankfurt
12	DF	(France)	Lahna Diawara	2026	12 September 2007 (age 19)	(France) Paris FC
13	DF	(Turkey)	Sıla Besra Tetik	2026	3 November 2005 (age 20)	(Turkey) Giresun Sanayispor
15	DF	(Portugal)	Carole Costa	2026	3 May 1990 (age 36)	(Portugal) Benfica
23	DF	(Turkey)	Narin Yakut	2025	26 April 2004 (age 22)	(Turkey) Fatih Vatan
64	DF	(Turkey)	Meryem Başkaya	2026	14 July 2005 (age 21)	(Denmark) Odense
Midfielders
6	MF	(South Korea)	Jang Chang	2025	21 June 1996 (age 30)	(South Korea) Incheon Hyundai Steel Red Angels WFC
14	MF	(Turkey)	Berra Pekgöz	2023	18 June 2007 (age 19)	(Turkey) Tunç Spor
16	MF	(Turkey)	Ebru Topçu (captain)	2022	27 August 1996 (age 30)	(Turkey) ALG Spor
17	MF	(Turkey)	İrem Eren	2024	17 August 2000 (age 26)	(Turkey) Fatih Vatan Spor
21	MF	(Poland)	Oliwia Domin	2026	2 January 2004 (age 22)	(France) Dijon FCO
22	MF	(Turkey)	Ecem Cumert	2024	7 February 1998 (age 28)	(Turkey) Fenerbahçe arsaVev
27	MF	(Netherlands)	Dana Foederer	2026	27 July 2002 (age 24)	(United States) Utah Royals
47	MF	(Turkey)	Arzu Akkurt	2021	1 July 2004 (age 22)	(Turkey) 1207 Antalya Spor
55	MF	(Turkey)	Elif Keskin	2025	12 January 2002 (age 24)	(Turkey) Beşiktaş
Forwards
7	FW	(Brazil)	Vitória Almeida	2026	26 August 1999 (age 27)	(Brazil) Flamengo
8	FW	(Brazil)	Marta Cintra	2025	27 April 2000 (age 26)	(Turkey) Fenerbahçe arsaVev
9	FW	(Spain)	Cristina Martín-Prieto	2026	14 March 1993 (age 33)	(Portugal) Benfica
10	FW	(Turkey) (Germany)	Melike Pekel	2025	14 April 1995 (age 31)	(Austria) SKN St. Pölten
20	FW	(Portugal)	Jéssica Silva	2026	11 December 1994 (age 31)	(Saudi Arabia) Al Hilal
71	FW	(Turkey)	Melike Öztürk	2025	1 April 2001 (age 25)	(Turkey) Fatih Vatan
98	FW	(Benin)	Aude Gbedjissi	2026	8 December 1998 (age 27)	(France) Lens

== Coaching staff ==
Position	Staff
Administrative Manager	(Turkey) Gülfem Kocaoğlu
Head coach	(Germany) (Turkey) Şaban Uzun
Assistant Coach	(Turkey) Remzi Kahraman
Goalkeeper Coach	(Germany) Niko Sternberg
Match and Performance Analyst	(Turkey) Birkan İpek
Athletic Performance Coach	(Turkey) Furkan Demir
Physiotherapist	(Turkey) Esra Yapıcıoğlu
Physiotherapist	(Turkey) Aysima Dikkatli
Masseur	(Turkey) Yasin Genç
Interpreter	(Turkey) Cemre Yücetoker
Outfitter	(Turkey) Emre Uçar

Last updated: 8 September 2026.
Source: Kadın Futbol Takımı İdari ve Teknik Kadro – GALATASARAY.ORG

== Coaching history ==
Dates	Name
2021–2022	(Turkey) Nurcan Çelik
2022–2025	(Turkey) Metin Ülgen
2025–2026	(Germany) Gábor Gallai
2026–present	(Germany) (Turkey) Şaban Uzun

== Club captains ==
This is a list of the senior team's captains in the recent years.

Period	Captain
2021–2022	(Turkey) İsmigül Yalçıner
2022–2023	(Serbia) Milica Denda
2023–2025	(Turkey) Emine Ecem Esen
2025–present	(Turkey) Ebru Topçu

== Honours ==
Women's Super League
Winners (1): 2023-24
Third place (1): 2022-23
Crystal Feet - Best Team Award: 2023-24.

== Kit history ==
2015–16 Junior Girls' Champ home	2021-22 home	2021-22 away	2021-22 alt	2021-22 training	2022-23 home
2022-23 away
