= Şenlikköy =

- Neighbourhood
- Location in Turkey Şenlikköy (Istanbul)
- Coordinates: 40.977°N 28.796°E
- Country: Turkey
- Province: Istanbul
- District: Bakırköy
- Population (2022): 29,078
- Time zone: UTC+3 (TRT)

Şenlikköy is a neighbourhood (Turkish: mahalle) in the municipality and district of Bakırköy, Istanbul Province, Turkey. Its population is 29,078 (2022). It is located along Marmara Sea, and borders to the northeast the neighborhood of Yeşilköy, to the northwest the district of Küçükçekmece.

The neighborhood was known as Kalatarya or Kalitarya into the twentieth century, based on the Byzantine-era name Γαλατάρια (Galataria, “milky,” most likely due to the presence of a mineral-rich spring).

== See also ==
- Florya
