= Giresun Sanayispor =

Turkish women's football club

- Founded: 1986; 40 years ago
- Ground: Giresun 75. Yıl Futbol Sahası
- Chairman: Ünal Göze
- Head coach: (Turkey) Caner Akdağ.
- League: Turkish Women's Football Super League
- 2024–25: Runners-up in Turkish Women'First League

Giresun Sanayispor, Prolift Giresun Sanayispor for sponsorship reasons, is a Turkish women's football club based in Giresun, northern Turkey. It was established in 1986. The team was promoted from the First League to the Super League to play in the 2025–26 season. Club president is Ünal Göze.

== History ==
Giresun Sanayispor was founded in 1986.

Giresun Sanayispor, which played in the Group 6 of the 2019-2020 Women's Third League, and was in first place by far, was promoted to the Women's Second League after the Turkish Football Federation Board of Directors ended the season prematurely due to the COVID-19 pandemic in Turkey. The Women's Second Leage season of 2020–21 was not played due to the pandemic. The team finished the 2021–22 Women's Second League season as runners-up, and was promoted to the Women's First League. In the 2024–25 Women's First League season, they became the most goal scoring team with 85 goals. The team finished the group stage as runners-up, and was promoted to the Women's Super League after the play-offs.

== Stadium ==
The team play their home matches at the Giresun 75.Yıl Futbol Sahası (Giresun 75th Anniversary Football Field).

== Statistics ==
As of 28 October 2026

| Season | League | Rank | Pld | W | D | L | GF | GA | GD | Pts |
|---|---|---|---|---|---|---|---|---|---|---|
| 2014–15 | Third League Gr. 5 | 2 | 12 | 10 | 0 | 2 | 49 | 10 | +39 | 30 |
| 2014–15 | Play-offs | | 1 | 0 | 0 | 1 | 2 | 4 | -2 | 0 |
| 2015–16 | Third League Gr. 4 | 1 | 18 | 14 | 2 | 2 | 74 | 20 | +54 | 44 |
| 2015–16 | Play-offs | | 1 | 0 | 0 | 1 | 1 | 3 | -2 | 0 |
| 2016–17 | Third League Gr. 5 | 2 | 24 | 21 | 1 | 2 | 103 | 13 | +90 | 64 |
| 2016–17 | Play-offs | | 2 | 1 | 0 | 1 | 3 | 7 | -4 | 3 |
| 2017–18 | Third League Gr. 6 | 1 | 12 | 9 | 2 | 1 | 46 | 12 | +34 | 29 |
| 2017–18 | Play-offs | | 3 | 2 | 0 | 1 | 5 | 3 | +2 | 6 |
| 2018–19 | Third League Gr. 11 | 1 | 8 | 7 | 0 | 1 | 30 | 9 | +21 | 21 |
| 2018–19 | Play-offs | | 2 | 1 | 0 | 1 | 4 | 3 | +1 | 3 |
| 2019–20 | Third League Gr. 6 | 1 | 14 | 12 | 1 | 1 | 81 | 9 | +72 | 37 |
| 2021–22 | Second League Gr. B | 2 | 10 | 6 | 0 | 4 | 23 | 12 | +11 | 18 |
| 2022–23 | First League | 10 | 24 | 6 | 6 | 12 | 36 | 54 | -18 | 21 (Note: 3 points were deducted by the decision of the Federation) |
| 2023–24 | First League Gr. A | 3 | 16 | 9 | 4 | 3 | 35 | 20 | +15 | 21 |
| 2023–24 | Play-offs | 5 | 10 | 3 | 1 | 6 | 13 | 16 | -3 | 10 |
| 2024–25 | First League Gr. A | 2 | 16 | 13 | 1 | 2 | 85 | 13 | +72 | 40 |
| 2024–25 | Play-offs | 2 | 6 | 2 | 3 | 1 | 7 | 5 | +2 | 26 |
| 2025–26 | Super League | 10 | 30 | 12 | 3 | 15 | 41 | 70 | +29 | 39 |
| 2026–27 | Super League | 15 | 8 (Note: Season in progress) | 0 | 0 | 8 | 1 | 64 | -63 | 0 |
Green marks a season followed by promotion, red a season followed by relegation.

- Legend:

== Current squad ==
As of 28 October 2026

- Head coach:

Note: Flags indicate national team as defined under FIFA eligibility rules; some limited exceptions apply. Players may hold more than one non-FIFA nationality.

| No. | Pos. | Nation | Player |
|---|---|---|---|
| 1 | GK | TUR | Yağmur Ülkü |
| 21 | GK | TUR | Melisa Kara |
| 3 | DF | TUR | Esma Çelik |
| 6 | DF | TUR | Yaren Civelek |
| 15 | DF | NGR | Juliet Emereole |
| 18 | DF | TUR | Melisa Keser |
| 4 | MF | TUR | Fatma Koç |

| No. | Pos. | Nation | Player |
|---|---|---|---|
| 5 | MF | TUR | Ayşenur Kırca |
| 20 | MF | TUR | Gözde Uçar |
| 7 | FW | TUR | Asya Bayraktar |
| 10 | FW | TUR | İlayda Akdeniz |
| 28 | FW | TUR | Seda Türkeş |
| 11 | | TUR | Sevgi Kuvan |

== Former notable players ==
Albania

- Vanesa Levenaj

Bosnia and Herzegovina

- Alma Krajnić
- Nikolina Milović

Ivory Coast

- Nina Kpaho

Mexico

- Karla Zempoalteca

Turkey

- Seval Kıraç

United States

- Aryana Harvey

== Honours ==
Womne's First League

Runners-ıp (1)
2024–25

Women's Second League

Runners-up (1)
2021–22

Women's Third League

Champions (1)
2019–20
