= Eda Karataş =

Turkish footballer (born 1995)

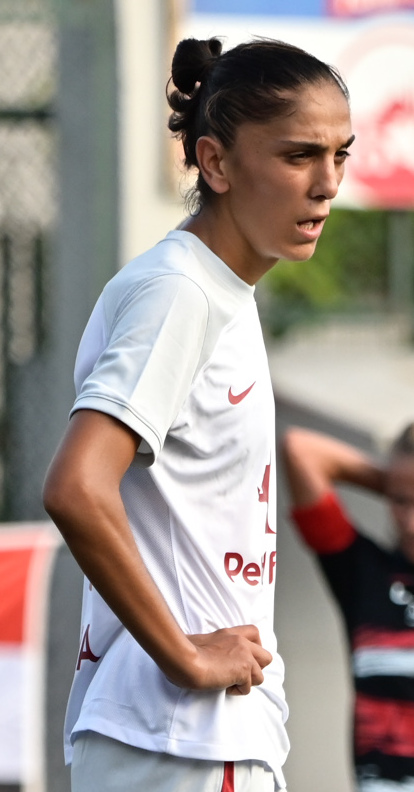
- Karataş playing for Galatasaray in 2023

Personal information
- Date of birth: 15 June 1995 (age 31)
- Place of birth: Beykoz, Turkey
- Position: Defender

Team information
- Current team: Galatasaray
- Number: 5

Senior career*
Years	Team	Apps	(Gls)
2007–2012	Marmara Üniversitesi Spor	55	(27)
2012–2016	Trabzon İdmanocağı	57	(15)
2016–2018	İlkadım	25	(5)
2018	Kireçburnu	6	(0)
2019–2021	Ataşehir	28	(5)
2021–2023	ALG SporALG	44	(8)
2023–	Galatasaray	51	(3)

International career^{‡}
2009–2010	Turkey U15	7	(1)
2010–2011	Turkey U17	12	(2)
2011–2012	Turkey U19	16	(2)
2012–	Turkey	24	(0)
- * Club domestic league appearances and goals as of 31 July 2025 ‡ National team caps and goals as of 29 October 2024

Eda Karataş (born 15 June 1995) is a Turkish women's football defender, who plays in the Women's Super League for Galatasaray with jersey number 5. She is a member of the Turkish national team.

== Early life ==
Eda Karataş was born to Fahri Karataş and his wife Zeliha in Beykoz district of Istanbul Province on 15 June 1995. She has three sisters.

She completed her secondary education at Ataşehir Mevlana High School in Istanbul.

== Club career ==
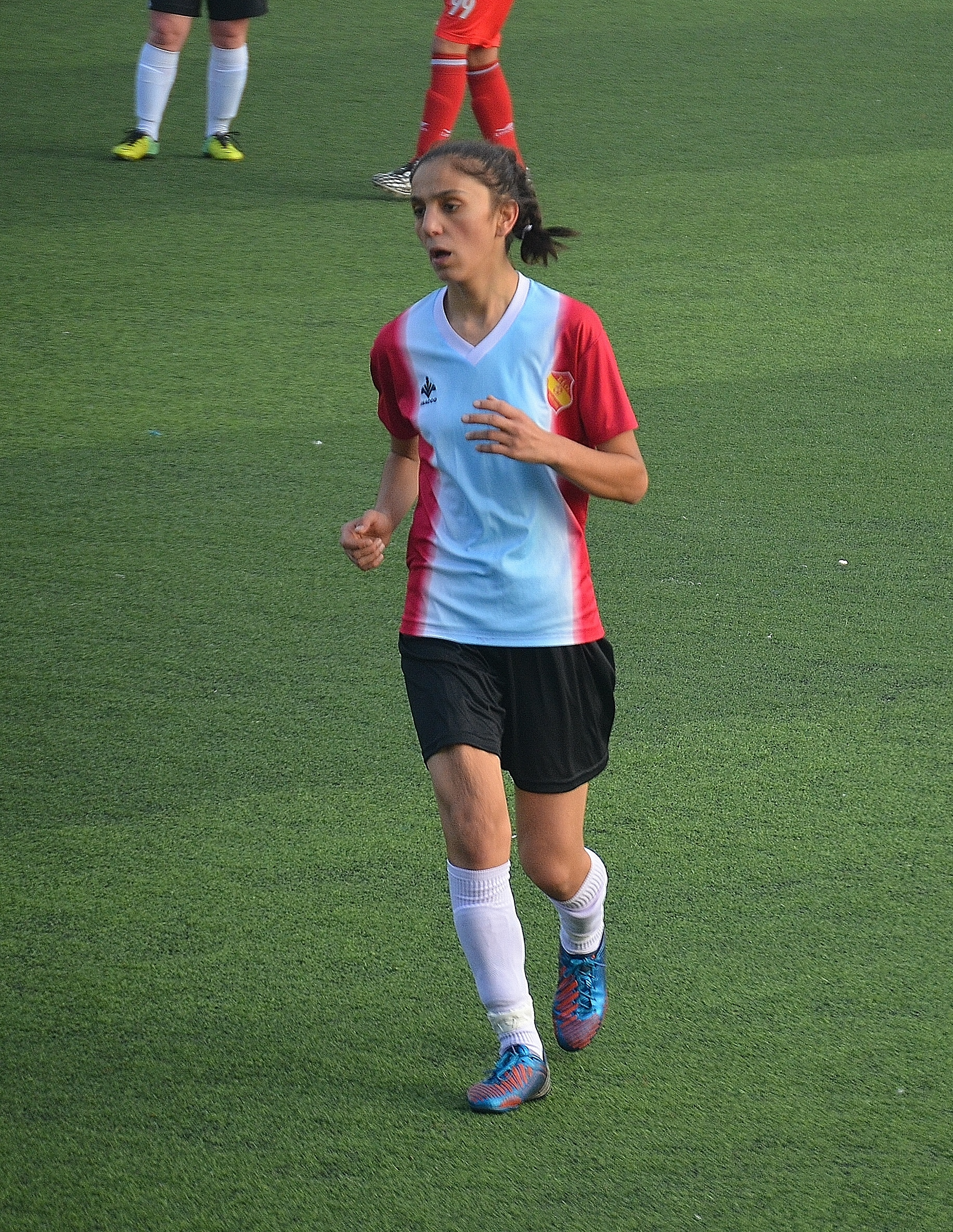
Eda Karataş of Trabzon İdmanocağı in the 2014–15 season.

She received her license on 7 March 2007, for Marmara Üniversitesi Spor, where she played until October 2012. In the 2012–13 season, Eda Karataş transferred to Trabzon İdmanocağı. In the 2013–14 season, she stood away from football, returned however to the football field in the beginning of the 2014–15 season. In the second half of the 2016–17 season, Karataş signed with İlkadım Belediyesi. After playing in the first half of the 2018–19 First League season for Kireçburnu Spor, she transferred to Ataşehir Belediyespor.

=== ALG Spor ===
In the 2021–22 Women's Super League season, she transferred to ALG Spor. She enjoyed her team's league champion title. On 18 August 2022, she debuted in the 2022–23 UEFA Women's Champions League.

=== Galatasaray ===
She signed a one-year contract with Galatasaray on 4 August 2023.

She signed a new 1-year contract with Galatasaray on 31 July 2025.

== International career ==
Elif Deniz was called up to the Turkey girls' U-15 national team, and debuted in the match against Georgia at the 2010 Summer Youth Olympics and scored one goal.

In June 2010, she became member of the Turkey girls' U-17 national team playing in the International Friendship Tournament matches. She played in all matches oat the 2011 UEFA Women's Under-17 Championship qualifying round Group 6, and of 2012 UEFA Women's Under-17 Championship qualifying round Group 7.

She played her first ever match for the Turkey women's U-19 national team against Ukraine at the Kuban Spring Tournament in 2011. She took part at the 2012 UEFA Women's Under-19 Championship – Group A matches. The UEFA named her one of the "10 most talented footballers" of the championship.

On 21 June 2012, Eda Karataş debuted in the UEFA Women's Euro 2013 qualifying – Group 2 match against Spain for the Turkey women's national team.

== Career statistics ==
As of 19 January 2025

Club	Season	League			Continental		National		Total	
Club	Season	Division	Apps	Goals	Apps	Goals	Apps	Goals	Apps	Goals
Marmara Üniversitesi	2008–09	Second League	6	4	–	–	0	0	6	4
Marmara Üniversitesi	2009–10	First League	17	4	–	–	5	3	22	7
Marmara Üniversitesi	2010–11	First League	22	4	–	–	17	1	39	5
Marmara Üniversitesi	2011–12	Second League	10	15	–	–	11	1	21	16
Marmara Üniversitesi	Total		55	27	–	–	33	5	88	32
Trabzon İdmanocağı	2012–13	First League	18	5	–	–	3	0	21	5
Trabzon İdmanocağı	2014–15	First League	16	5	–	–	0	0	16	5
Trabzon İdmanocağı	2015–16	First League	18	3	–	–	0	0	18	3
Trabzon İdmanocağı	2016–17	First League	5	2	–	–	0	0	5	2
Trabzon İdmanocağı	Total		57	15	–	–	3	0	60	15
İlkadım	2016–17	First League	11	4	–	–	0	0	11	4
İlkadım	2017–18	First League	14	1	–	–	0	0	14	1
İlkadım	Total		25	5	–	–	0	0	25	5
Kireçburnu	2018–19	First League	6	0	–	–	0	0	6	0
Ataşehir	2018–19	First League	8	1	–	–	0	0	8	1
Ataşehir	2019–20	First League	16	3	–	–	0	0	16	3
Ataşehir	2020–21	First League	4	1	–	–	0	0	4	1
Ataşehir	Total		28	5	–	–	0	0	28	5
ALG	2021–22	Super League	27	1	–	–	1	0	28	1
ALG	2022–23	Super League	17	7	1	0	6		24	7
ALG	Total		44	8	1	0	7	0	52	8
Galatasaray	2023–24	Super League	29	2	-	-	13	0	42	2
Galatasaray	2024–25	Super League	9	0	11	0	3	0	23	0
Galatasaray	Total		38	2	11	0	16	0	65	2
Career total			253	62	12	0	59	5	324	67

== Honours ==
Trabzon İdmanocağı

- Turkish Women's Football First League third places: 2014–15

ALG

- Turkish Women's Football Super League: 2021–22

Galatasaray

- Turkish Women's Football Super League: 2023–24
