= Ebru Topçu =

Turkish footballer (born 1996)

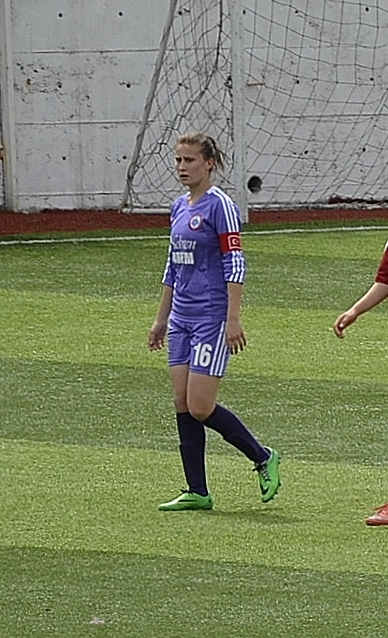
- Ebru Topçu for Kdz. Ereğlispor (2013–14)

Personal information
- Date of birth: 27 August 1996 (age 30)
- Place of birth: Karadeniz Ereğli, Turkey
- Position: Midfielder

Team information
- Current team: Galatasaray
- Number: 16

Senior career*
Years	Team	Apps	(Gls)
2006–2014	Kdz. Ereğli Belediye Spor	105	(79)
2014–2017	Konak Belediyespor	56	(29)
2017–2018	Ataşehir Belediyespor	18	(8)
2018–2019	Konak Belediyespor	16	(7)
2019–2022	ALG Spor	48	(28)
2022–	Galatasaray	102	(52)

International career
2010	Turkey U-15	2	(4)
2011–2013	Turkey U-17	16	(12)
2012–2015	Turkey U-19	40	(21)
2014	Turkey U-21	1	(1)
2013–	Turkey	101	(25)
- * Club domestic league appearances and goals

Ebru Topçu (born 27 August 1996) is a Turkish women's footballer who plays as a Midfielder in the Turkish Women's First Football League for Galatasaray in Istanbul. She was admitted to the Turkey women's national football team in 2013 after playing for the national U-15, U-17 and U-19 teams.

== Early life ==
Ebru Topçu was born on August 27, 1996, in Karadeniz Ereğli town of Zonguldak Province. Her father was a coal miner working in the Armutçuk coal mine. She has a one-year older brother, who is a professional footballer.

Football was a main theme at her home. During her childhood, she played football along with her neighbor Berna Yeniçeri and her brother's friends. Her father, who also played football in his youth, took her to the newly established women's team Kdz. Ereğlispor and registered her at the age of only 10.

== Playing career ==
During her high school years, she was a member of the school football team, which became Turkish champion in the 2013–14 season.

Topçu plays as midfielder in her club while she is a center-forward in the national team.

== Club career ==
=== Kdz. Ereğli Belediye Spor ===
She began football playing in the internal feeder team of Kdz. Ereğlispor in 2006. The talented girl took part at a total of 110 matches until September 2013, including 80 league matches, 8 UEFA championship and 22 friendly international matches. A star of her club, she scored 92 goals in that time.

=== Konak Belediyespor ===
Topçu was transferred by the league-champion of the 2013–14 season Konak Belediyespor on July 25, 2014. She took part at the 2014–15 UEFA Women's Champions League qualifying round matches. In the first two games, she scored three goals for her new team. Topçu played in three matches of the 2015–16 UEFA Women's Champions League qualifying round, and scored one goal.

At the end of the 2015–16 season, she enjoyed her team's champion title. She played in three matches of the Group 9 of the 2016–17 UEFA Women's Champions League qualifying round.

=== Ataşehir Belediyespor ===
By mid August, she transferred to the Istanbul-based rival Ataşehir Belediyespor after three seasons with Konak Belediyespor.

=== Konak Belediyespor (return) ===
In the 2018–19 First League season, she returned to her former club Konak Belediyespor.

=== ALG Spor ===
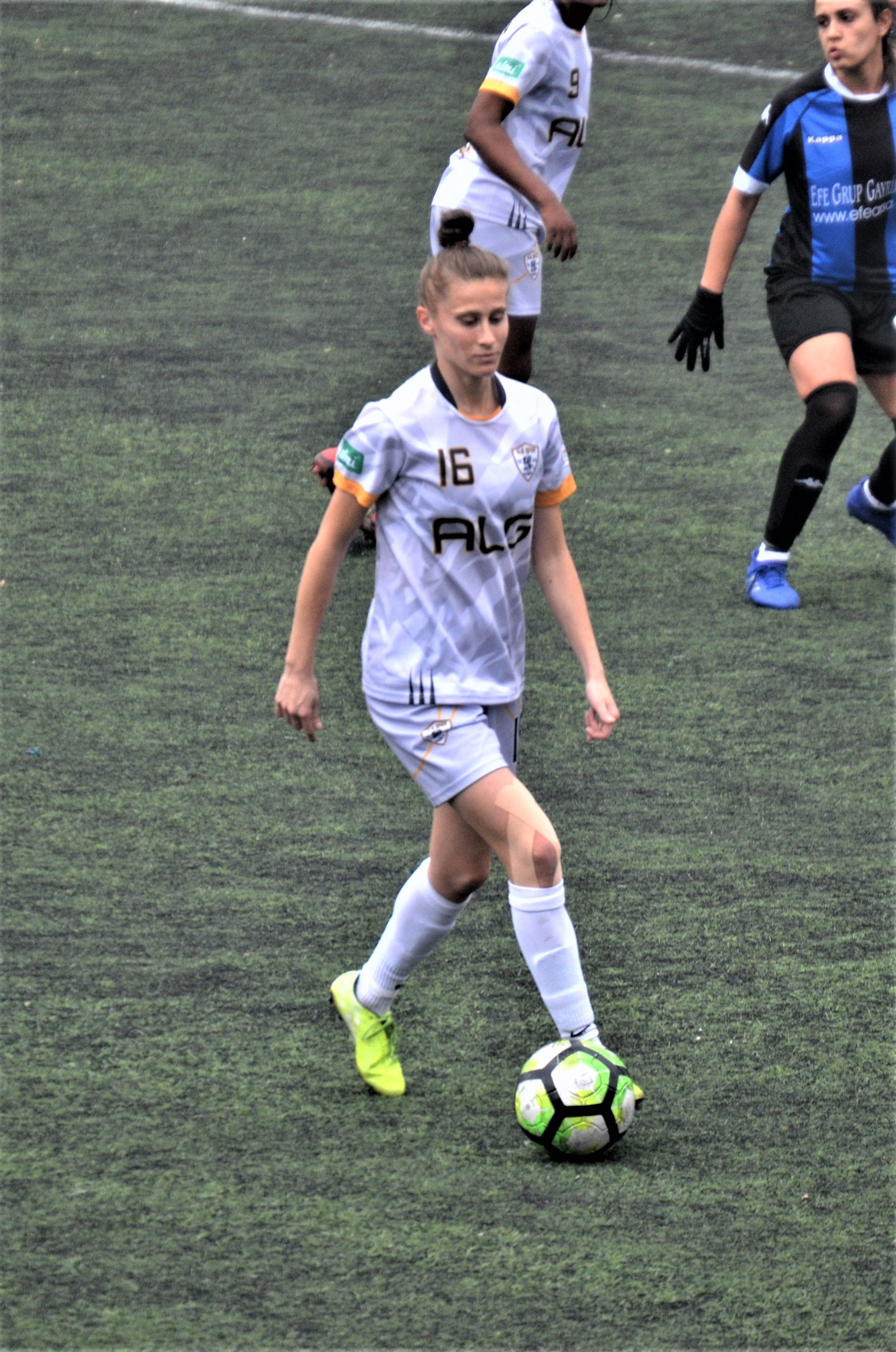
Ebru Topçu of ALG Spor in the 2019–20 Women's First League season

The next season, she moved to the Gaziantep-based club ALG Spor. She played at the 2020–21 UEFA Women's Champions League qualifying round against the Albanian team KFF Vllaznia Shkodër in Shkodër, Albania on 3 November 2020, and scored one goal in the penalty shoot-out. She enjoyed the 2021–22 Women's Super League champion title of her team.

=== Galatasaray ===
On 9 August 2022, she transferred to the Women's Super League club Galatasaray.

On July 8, 2025, she signed a new 1-year contract with Galatasaray.

She signed a new one-year contract with Galatasaray on July 3, 2026. The successful midfielder, who is preparing for her 5th season with Galatasaray, has made significant contributions to her team by scoring 53 goals in 105 official matches in the past four seasons.

== International career ==
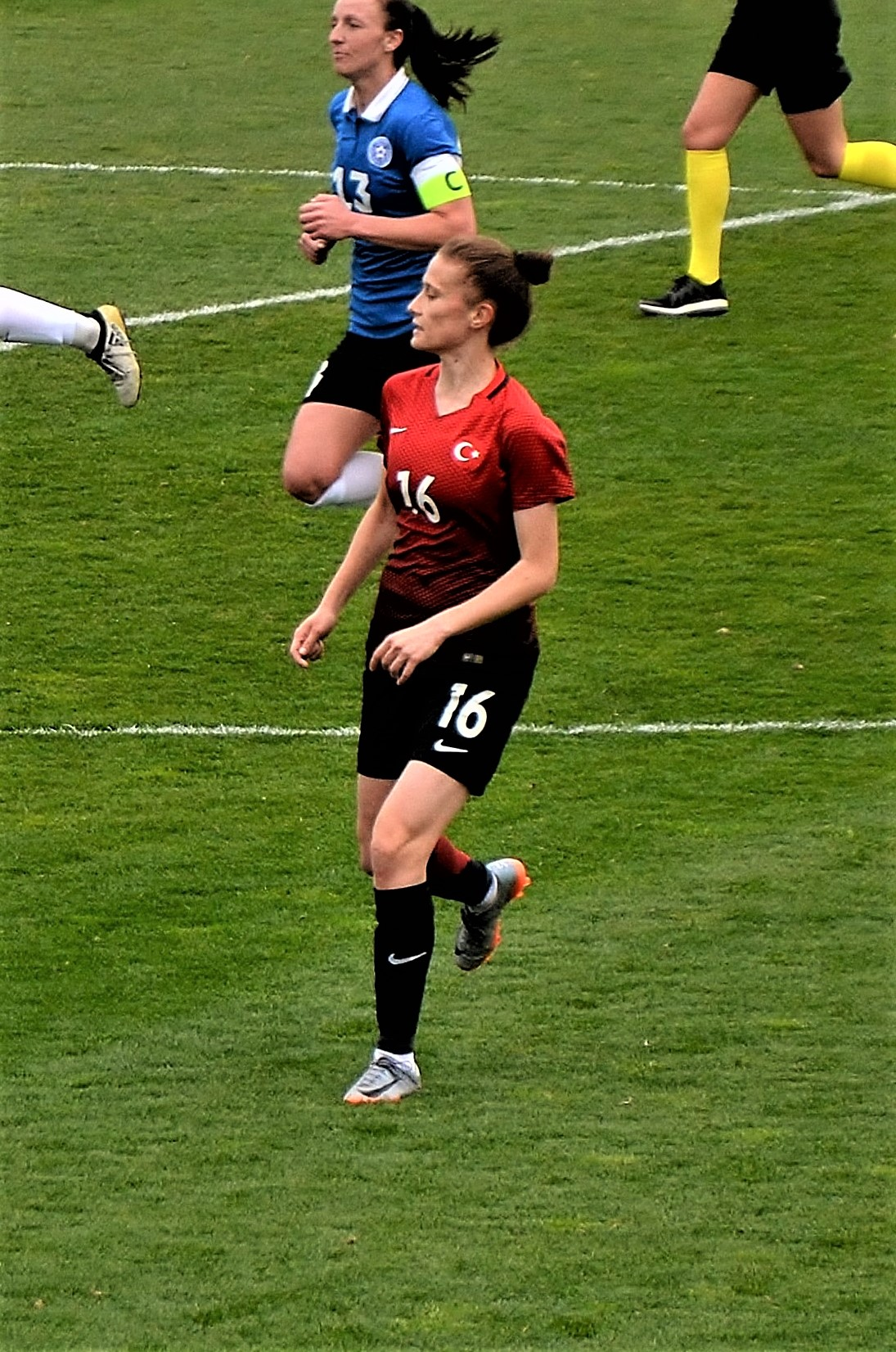
Ebru Topçu (red/black) playing for Turkey national in the friendly match against Estonia at TFF Riva Facility on April 7, 2018.

At the age of 14, she was admitted to the Turkey Girls' U-15 team. In her ever first international match, she scored three goals against the Russian girls on November 23, 2010.

Topçu played at the 2012 UEFA Women's Under-17 Championship qualification matches in 2011 and at the 2013 UEFA Women's Under-17 Championship qualifications in 2012.

In 2012, she scored one of the three goals for the Turkey women's U-19 team against the team from Ukraine at the International Kuban Spring Tournament. She shot two goals at the 2014 UEFA Women's Under-19 Championship qualification against Montenegro. On November 28, 2013, she scored the third goal for Turkey in the 2015 FIFA Women's World Cup qualification – UEFA Group 6 match against Montenegrin team that ended with 3–1.

In 2014, she debuted in the Turkey women's U-21 team's friendly match against Belgium, and scored a goal.

International goals (Friendly matches not included)
Date	Venue	Opponent	Competition	Result	Scored
Turkey girls' U-17 team
September 29, 2011	Stadion Mirko Vučurević Banatski Dvor, Serbia	Serbia	2012 UEFA Women's Under-17 Championship qualification	L 3–4	2
October 4, 2011	Stadion Mirko Vučurević Banatski Dvor, Serbia	Denmark	2012 UEFA Women's Under-17 Championship qualification	L 1–3	1
August 28, 2012	Sport Centre Arkadija Stadium Riga, Latvia	Wales	2013 UEFA Women's Under-17 Championship qualification	W 2–0	2
August 30, 2012	Sport Centre Arkadija Stadium Riga, Latvia	Norway	2013 UEFA Women's Under-17 Championship qualification	L 1–5	1
September 2, 2012	Sport Centre Arkadija Stadium Riga, Latvia	Latvia	2013 UEFA Women's Under-17 Championship qualification	W 1–0	1
June 25, 2013	Sport Centre Belgrade Belgrade, Serbia	Serbia	İnt'l Youth Tournament	W 5–1	2
Turkey women's U-19 team
March 7, 2012	Sputnik-Sport Center Sochi, Russia	Slovakia	2012 Int'l Kuban Spring Tournament	W 3–0	1
March 8, 2012	Sputnik-Sport Center Sochi, Russia	China	2012 Int'l Kuban Spring Tournament	W 2–0	1
March 12, 2012	Sputnik-Sport Center Sochi, Russia	Ukraine	2012 Int'l Kuban Spring Tournament	W 3–0	1
March 14, 2012	Sputnik-Sport Center Sochi, Russia	China	2012 Int'l Kuban Spring Tournament	L 5–6	1
September 26, 2013	Tatabánya, Hungary	Montenegro	2014 UEFA Women's Under-19 Championship qualification	W 3–1	2
March 25, 2014	Sputnik-Sport Center Sochi, Russia	Iran	2014 Int'l Kuban Spring Tournament	W 1–0	1
March 27, 2014	Sputnik-Sport Center Sochi, Russia	Hungary	2014 Int'l Kuban Spring Tournament	D 1–1	1
July 27, 2014	Zimbru Stadium Chișinău, Moldova	Moldova	UEFA Development Tournament	W 3–1	1
August, 2014	Sputnik-Sport Center Sochi, Russia	Romania	UEFA Development Tournament	W 7–0	1
September 18, 2014	İnegöl İlçe Stadium, Bursa, Turkey	Kazakhstan	2015 UEFA Women's Under-19 Championship qualification round – Group 4	W 6–1	3
April 11, 2015	Estádio Fernando Cabrita, Lagos, Portugal	Finland	2015 UEFA Women's Under-19 Championship Elite round – Group 1	D 2–2	1
Turkey women's
November 28, 2013	Buca Arena İzmir, Turkey	Montenegro	2015 FIFA Women's World Cup qualification – UEFA Group 6	W 3–1	1
March 5, 2017	Gold City Stadium, Antalya, Turkey	Kosovo	Goldcity Women's Cup 2017	W 4–2	1
April 6, 2017	Tórsvøllur, Tórshavn, Faroe Islands	Montenegro	2019 FIFA Women's World Cup qualification – UEFA preliminary round – Group 4	W 3–0	2
April 8, 2017	Tórsvøllur, Tórshavn, Faroe Islands	Luxembourg	2019 FIFA Women's World Cup qualification – UEFA preliminary round – Group 4	W 9–1	1
July 12, 2021	Elbasan Stadium, Elbasan, Albania	Albania	Friendly	W 2–1	1
July 15, 2021	Selman Stërmasi Stadium, Tirana, Albania	Albania	Friendly	W 4–1	1
November 30, 2021	Mersin Arena, Mersin, Turkey	Israel	2023 FIFA Women's World Cup qualification – UEFA Group H	W 3–2	1
February 23, 2022	Gürsel Aksel Stadium, İzmir, Turkey	Serbia	2023 FIFA Women's World Cup qualification – UEFA Group H	L 2–5	1
April 7, 2022	Plovdiv Stadium, Plovdiv, Bulgaria	Bulgaria	2023 FIFA Women's World Cup qualification – UEFA Group H	W 2–0	1
October 27, 2023	Stade Émile Mayrisch, Esch-sur-Alzette, Luxembourg	Luxembourg	2023–24 UEFA Women's Nations League C	W 4–0	1
May 31, 2024	Erzincan 13 Şubat Şehir Stadium, Erzincan, Turkey	Azerbaijan	UEFA Women's Euro 2025 qualifying League B	W 1–0	1
March 3, 2026	Pendik Stadium, Istanbul, Turkey	Malta	2027 FIFA Women's World Cup qualification – UEFA League B	W 3–0	1
April 14, 2026	Letzigrund, Zurich, Switzerland	Switzerland	2027 FIFA Women's World Cup qualification – UEFA League B	L 1–3	1

== Career statistics ==
As of 25 May 2026.

Club	Season	League			Continental		National		Total	
Club	Season	Division	Apps	Goals	Apps	Goals	Apps	Goals	Apps	Goals
Kdz. Ereğli Belediye Spor	2008–09	Second League	8	1	–	–	0	0	8	1
Kdz. Ereğli Belediye Spor	2009–10	Second League	18	19	–	–	0	0	18	19
Kdz. Ereğli Belediye Spor	2010–11	Second League	22	17	–	–	4	5	26	22
Kdz. Ereğli Belediye Spor	2011–12	First League	22	14	–	–	14	10	36	24
Kdz. Ereğli Belediye Spor	2012–13	First League	18	19	–	–	15	7	33	26
Kdz. Ereğli Belediye Spor	2013–14	First League	17	9	–	–	21	10	38	19
Kdz. Ereğli Belediye Spor	Total		105	79	–	–	54	32	159	111
Konak Belediyespor	2014–15	First League	17	18	3	2	14	9	34	29
Konak Belediyespor	2015–16	First League	16	5	3	1	10	1	29	7
Konak Belediyespor	2016–17	First League	23	6	3	0	6	4	32	10
Konak Belediyespor	Total		56	29	9	3	30	14	95	46
Ataşehir Belediyespor	2017–18	First League	18	8	0	0	3	2	21	10
Ataşehir Belediyespor	Total		18	8	0	0	3	2	21	10
Konak Belediyespor	2018–19	First League	16	7	0	0	6	1	22	8
Konak Belediyespor	Total		16	7	0	0	6	1	22	8
ALG Spor	2019–20	First League	15	15	0	0	7	0	22	15
ALG Spor	2020–21	First League	6	5	1	1	6	0	13	6
ALG Spor	2021–22	Super League	27	8	0	0	13	5	40	13
ALG Spor	Total		48	28	1	1	26	5	75	34
Galatasaray S.K.	2022–23	Super League	22	17	0	0	4	3	26	20
Galatasaray S.K.	2023-24	Super League	29	15					29	15
Galatasaray S.K.	2024-25	Super League	24	12	8	1			24	12
Galatasaray S.K.	2025-26	Super League	23	8					23	8
Galatasaray S.K.	Total		102	52	8	1	4	3	114	56
Career total			341	203	18	5	123	57	482	265

International goals
Date	Venue	Opponent	Competition	Result	Scored
Konak Belediyespor
August 9, 2014	Stadions Arkādija Riga, Latvia	(Latvia) Rīgas FS	2014–15 UEFA Champions League	W 11–0	1
August 11, 2014	Stadions Arkādija Riga, Latvia	(Belarus) FC Minsk	2014–15 UEFA Champions League	W 2–1	2
ALG Spor
November 3, 2020	Loro Boriçi Stadium, BShkodër, Albania	(Albania) Vllaznia	2020–21 UEFA Women's Champions League qualifying round	L 3–3 (a.e.t.) (3–2 p)	1

== Honours ==
=== Club ===
Turkish Women's First League

Kdz. Ereğlispor
Third places (2): 2011–12, 2012–13

Konak Belediyespor
Winners (3): 2014–15, 2015–16, 2016–17
Third places (1): 2018–19

Ataşehir Belediyespor
Winners (1): 2017–18

ALG Spor
Winners (2): 2019–20, 2021–22
Third places (1): 2020–21

Galatasaray
Winners (1): 2023–24

=== Individual ===
Crystal Feet - Most Valuable Player: 2023-24,
Crystal Feet - Best Midfielder: 2023-24.
