= Florya Atatürk Forest =

Forest in Istanbul, Turkey

Coordinates: 40°58′39″N 28°47′15″E

Florya Atatürk Forest Turkish: Florya Atatürk Kent Ormanı
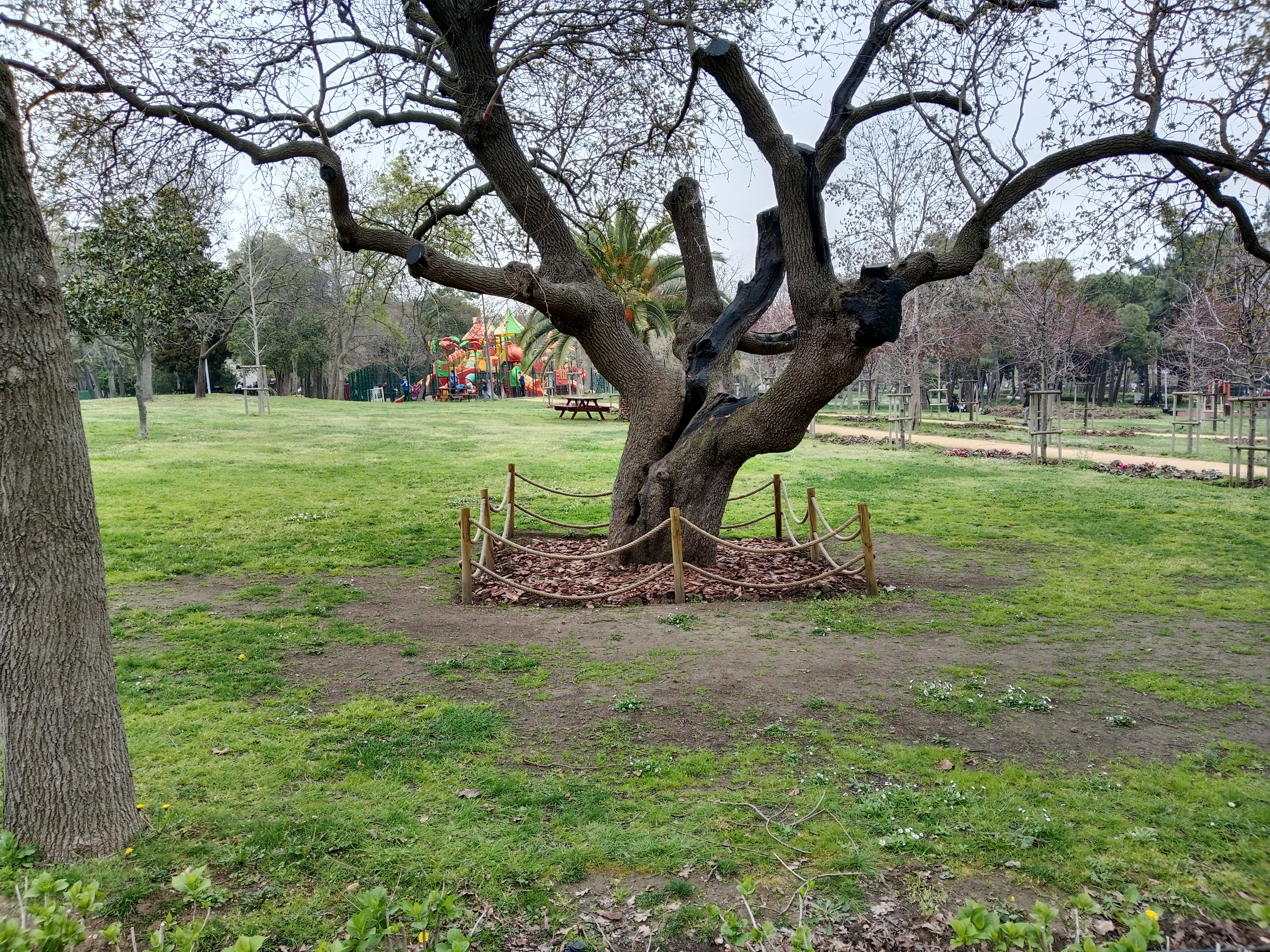
- an old tree in the forest

- Location within Istanbul

Geography
- Location: Bakırköy, Istanbul, Turkey
- Area: 67.52 ha (166.8 acres)

Administration
- Established: 1936
- Authority: Istanbul Metropolitan Municipality
- Website: yesil.istanbul

Florya Atatürk Forest is an urban forest in Florya, Bakırköy, Istanbul. The forest covers an area of 67.52 ha. It is administratively under the Istanbul Metropolitan Municipality, and is next to Florya railway station.

== History ==
The first step for Florya Ataturk Forest was taken in 1936, when French architect and urban planner Henri Prost prepared a green-oriented urban plan extending from the Yenikapı-Yedikule pedestrian road to Yeşilköy Airport and Florya by Atatürk's instruction. With a special decree signed by Mustafa Kemal Atatürk on 10/17/1937 and numbered 2/7485, the area was established. As stated in the decree, Ord. Prof. Mazhar Diker, along with İsmail Dağlı and İsmail Sütmen, were assigned to not only prepare the afforestation techniques, plans and reports to be applied in the urban forest, which was established mainly to protect the region from abiotic effects such as wind and storms and to meet the health-aesthetic and recreational needs of the society, and but also put these principles into practice. At a time when the definition of “urban forest” had not yet been well established, this area which was brought to life with Mustafa Kemal Atatürk's design on the periphery of Istanbul at that time, not only fulfills the definition today, but also has an indisputable importance in the present and future of the green space system of this great metropolis. By the works initiated according to the decree the forest was extended step by step from 1938 to 1957, and in 1960 it reached up to 22.92 ha. Up to present the forest was afforested, and its area reached up to 67.52 ha.

In 1991-1992 the forest was at risk because a zoo project was planned to be built in the forest but Faculty of Veterinary Science stated that the forest did not include necessary conditions for a zoo, and the project was cancelled.

== Flora ==
The Florya Atatürk Forest includes a widespread variety of plants, some of whom are veteran trees including Pistacia and Cypress.

It is determined that soil structure in the forest comprises sand (39.1%), clay (33.7%) and silt (26.2%) in average. Also its soil is calcareous above average (28.4%), and has a high concentration of phosphorus (28.4%) in average. Besides the forest includes variable trees, some of which are evergreen including Cypress, Thuja, Pinus pinaster, Pinus pinea and Pinus nigra. On the other hand, there are much more deciduous trees that are Quercus, Celtis, Platanus, Pistacia, and Ailanthus altissima.

The forest can produce oxygen of 202.6 ton/year, and has a dust holding capacity of 2338.49 ton/year.

Florya Atatürk Forest is a green space that is near to the city center. On holidays residents from the adjacent districts like resting in the urban forest.

== Fauna ==
Fauna of the forest is specially rich in birds including red-footed falcon, tree pipit, little owl, great spotted woodpecker, and long-eared owl. Also some bat species that are common noctule, Nathusius's pipistrelle, Kuhl's pipistrelle, etc., live in the forest.

== Gallery ==
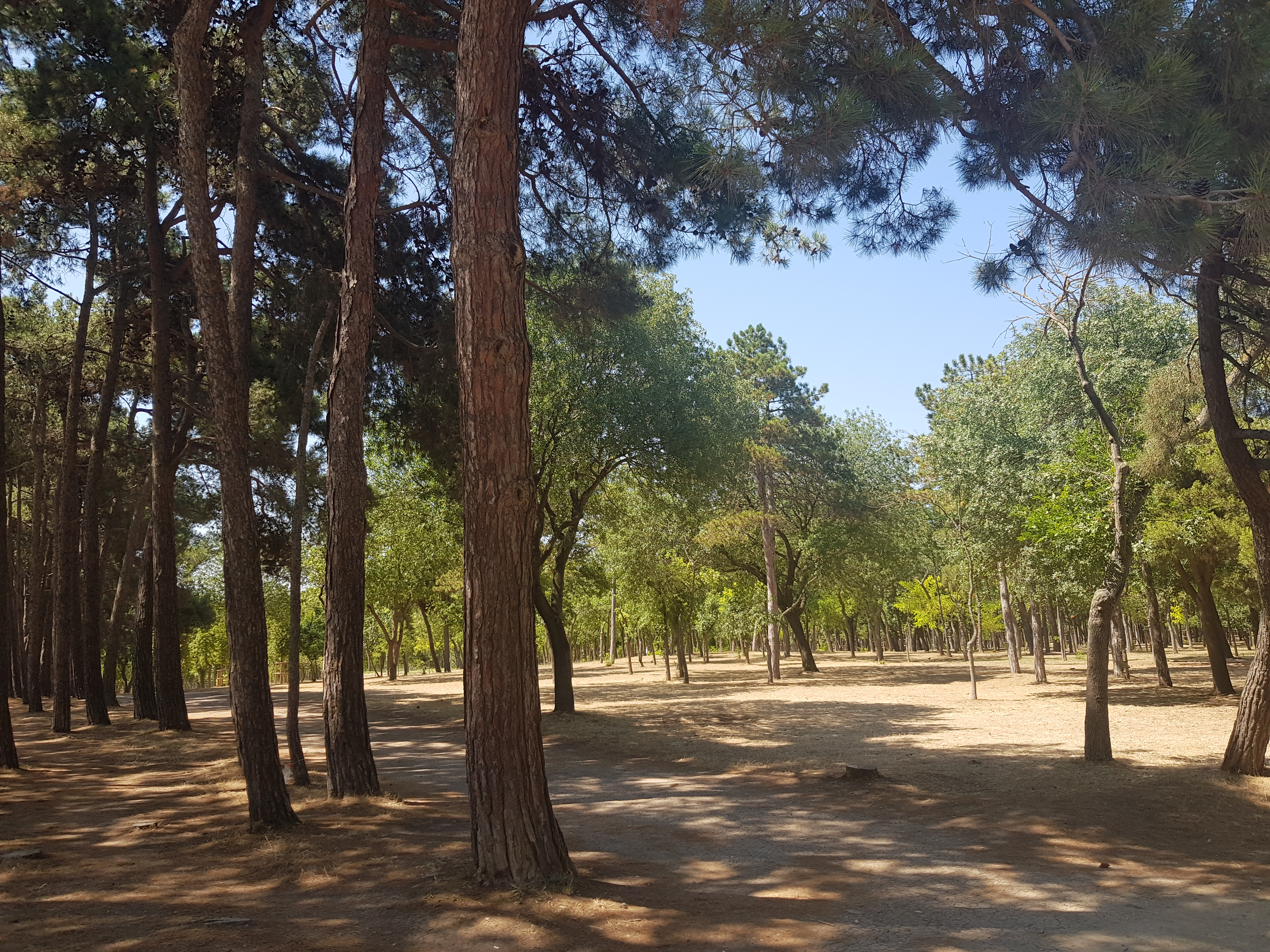
Pine trees in the Florya Atatürk Forest

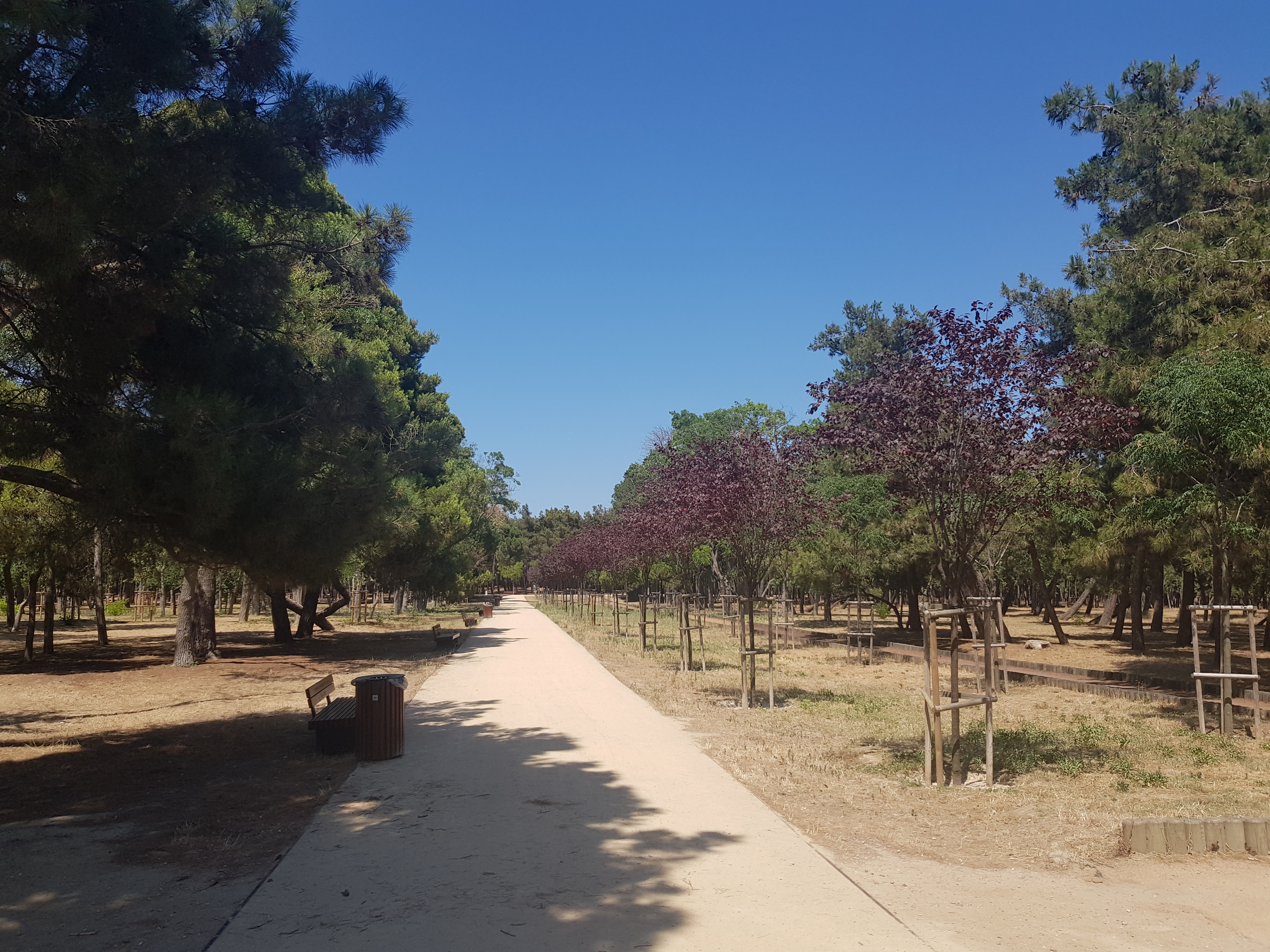
Evergreen and deciduous trees in the Florya Atatürk Forest

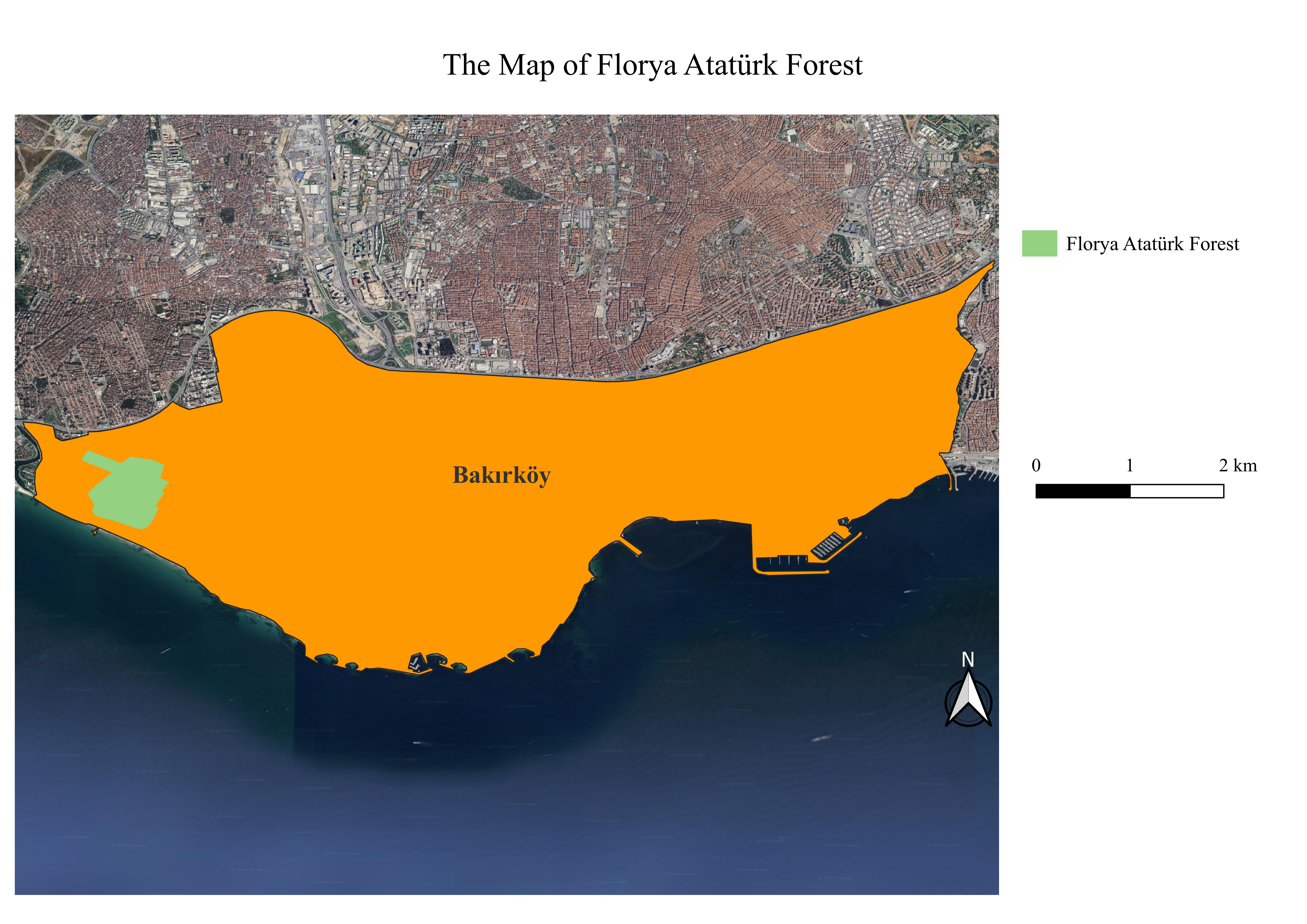
The map of Florya Atatürk Forest
