= Ataköy =

Ataköy (literally "elder village") is a Turkish place name that may refer to:

- Ataköy, Adıyaman
- Ataköy, Aksaray, a village in the district of Aksaray, Aksaray Province, Turkey
- Ataköy, Almus
- Ataköy, Bakırköy, a quarter in Bakırköy district of Istanbul Province, Turkey
  - Ataköy Athletics Arena, an indoor sporting arena in the neighborhood
  - Ataköy (Istanbul Metro), metro station
  - Ataköy Gunpowder Mill, historical complex
  - Atakoy Olympic Pool Stadium
  - Galleria Ataköy, a mall in the neighborhood
- Ataköy, Bismil, neighbourhood in the municipality and district of Bismil, Diyarbakır Province, Turkey
- Ataköy, Devrek
- Ataköy, Haymana, a village in the district of Haymana, Ankara Province, Turkey
- Ataköy, Karacasu, a village in the district of Karacasu, Aydın Province, Turkey
- Ataköy, Karataş, a village in the district of Karataş, Adana Province, Turkey
- Ataköy, Kars, village in the Central district of Kars province, Turkey
- Ataköy, Kızıltepe
- Ataköy, Köprüköy, neighbourhood in the municipality and district of Köprüköy, Erzurum Province, Turkey
- Ataköy, Nurdağı
- Ataköy Dam, a dam in Tokat Province, Turkey
