= Ammoi =

Town of ancient Thrace

Coordinates: 40°58′49″N 28°53′05″E

Ammoi (Greek: 'Άμμοι Ammoi) was a town of ancient Thrace, inhabited during Byzantine times.

Its site is located east of Bakırköy in European Turkey. The name, meaning “The Sands,” is likely derived from its location on the shore of the Sea of Marmara.
