= Camera Museum, Istanbul =

Museum in Istanbul, Turkey

Coordinates: 40.99430°N 28.87936°E

The Camera Museum (Turkish: Hilmi Nakipoğlu Fotoğraf Makineleri Müzesi) is a privately owned museum in Istanbul, Turkey owned by Hilmi Nakipoğlu exhibiting cameras.

Established in 1997, the museum is located at Osmaniye Cad. 18B, Zihinsel Engelliler Okulu (School for Mental Disableds) Floor 4, Bakırköy, Istanbul. It features around 900 cameras of various type dated from 1896 to today and accessories.

== See also ==
- Camera Museum, Malatya
