= Ayamama Life Valley =

Park in Ataköy, Istanbul, Turkey

Ayamama Life Valley (Turkish: Ayamama Yaşam Vadisi) is a park located along the Ayamama stream in Ataköy, Bakırköy, Istanbul. It is administratively under the Istanbul Metropolitan Municipality (IMM), and is next to Yenibosna station in M1-M9 and Ataköy railway station.

The park is a green corridor, that lies from E5 to Marmara sea continuously, has bike path, sidewalk, a dance floor, a biolake and playgrounds for children. In 2009, a flood disaster caused many casualties through the Ayamama stream due to technical neglections.

After 2019 Turkish local elections, IMM decided that the area around Ayamama stream needed to be ecologically redesigned to protect against flooding, and prepared a stream restoration project that would enlarge the channel section. The first stage of Ayamama Life Valley, that covers an area of 186,000 m^{2} was opened in 2023. This park consists of three stages, two of which are still under construction, and will also include sports areas. When the all stages are completed total area of the park will be 1 million m^{2}. It is considered that the park is an urban green space in which people and nature coexist. Besides C40 supported the Ayamama Life Valley project that provides an uninterrupted green corridor of 7 kilometers for people in Istanbul. Recently Bakırköy Municipality opened a retirement club in this park in order to organize various social events for old people that form an important part of Bakırköy's population.

Ayamama Life Valley has vast green areas which are home to different birds including red-backed shrike, common buzzard, eurasian magpie, white-eared bulbul, great tit, spotted flycatcher, rose-ringed parakeet etc.

== Gallery ==
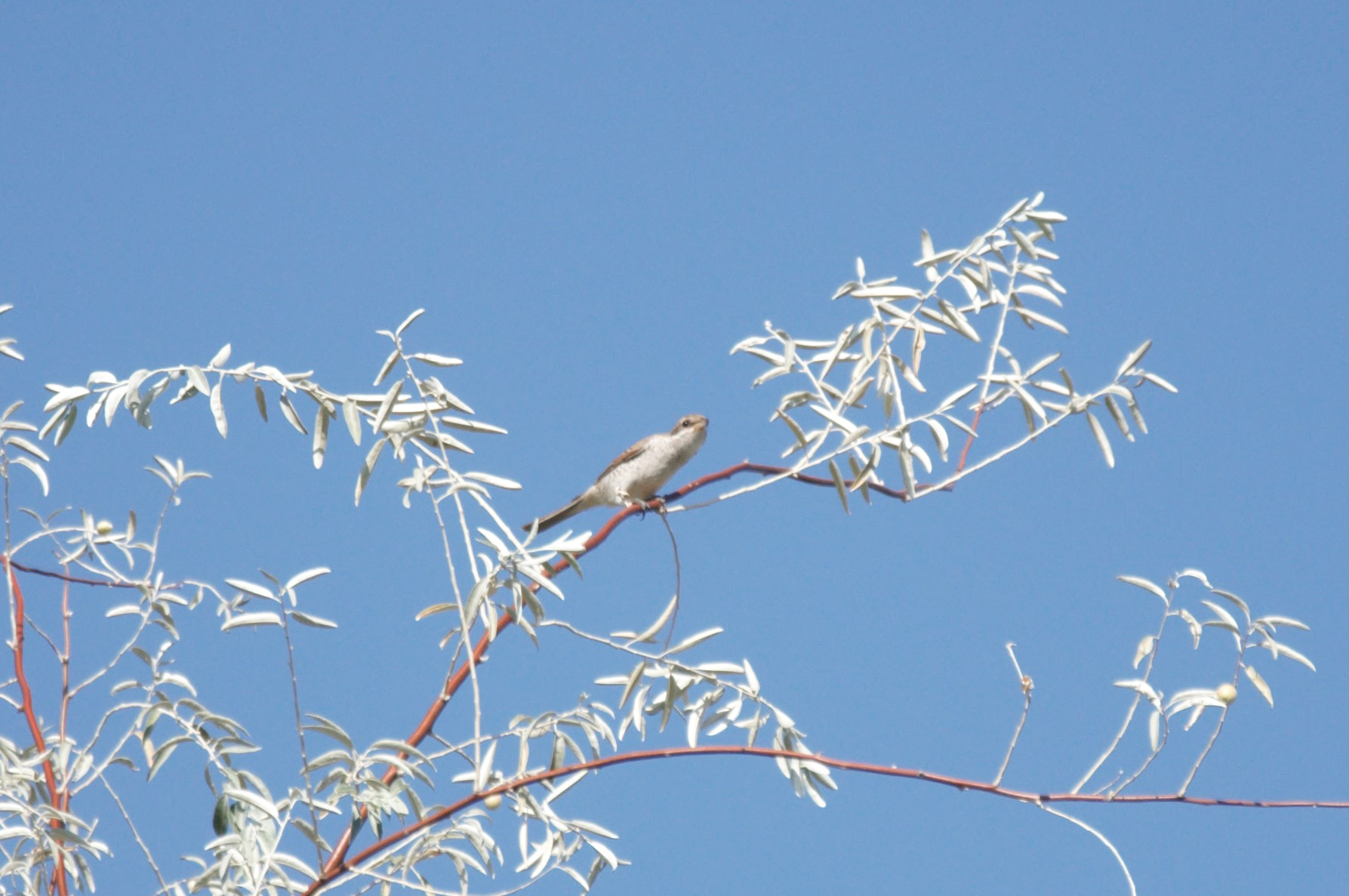
Red-backed Shrike in Ayamama Life Valley

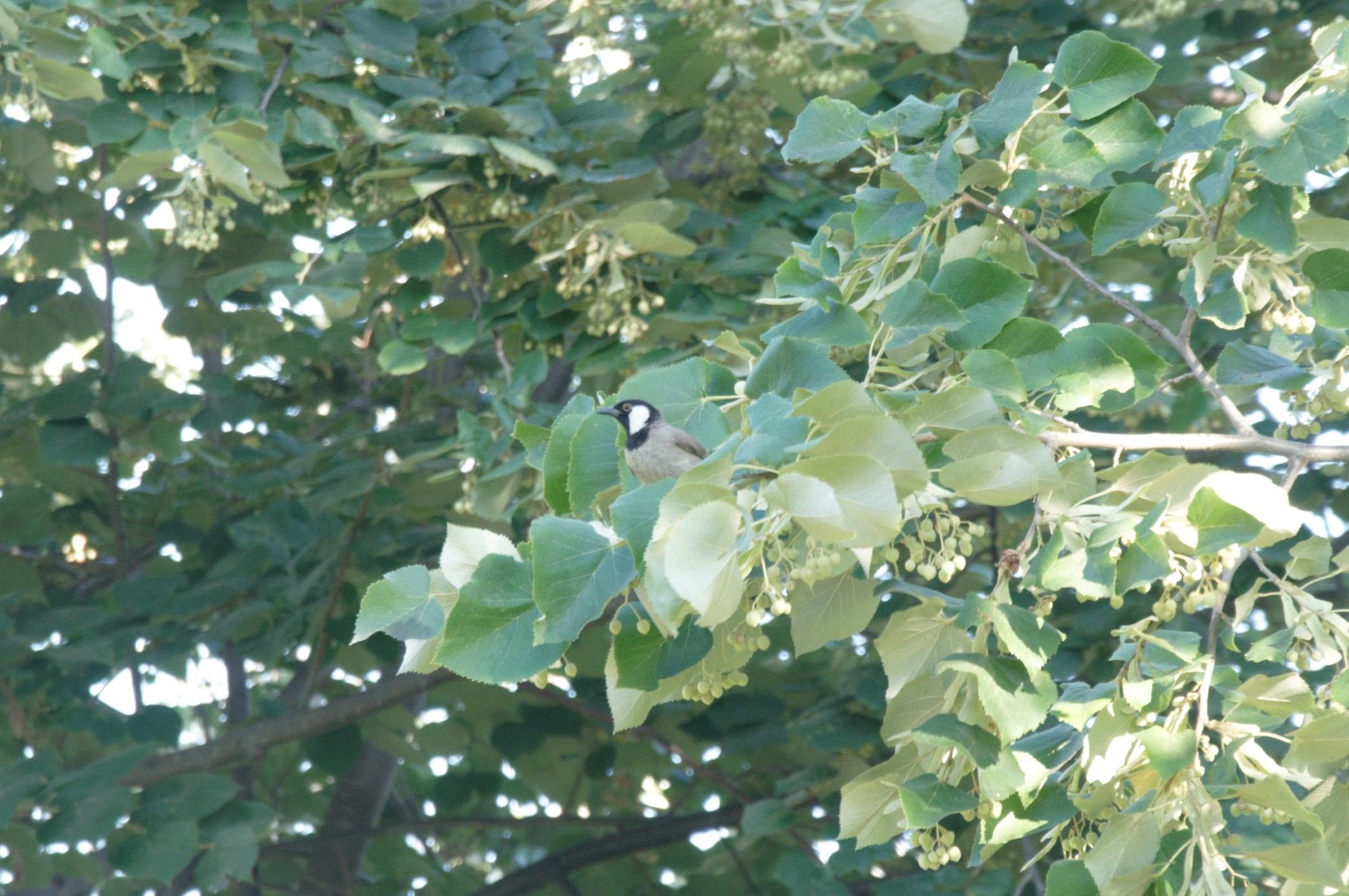
A white-eared bulbul in Ayamama Life Valley

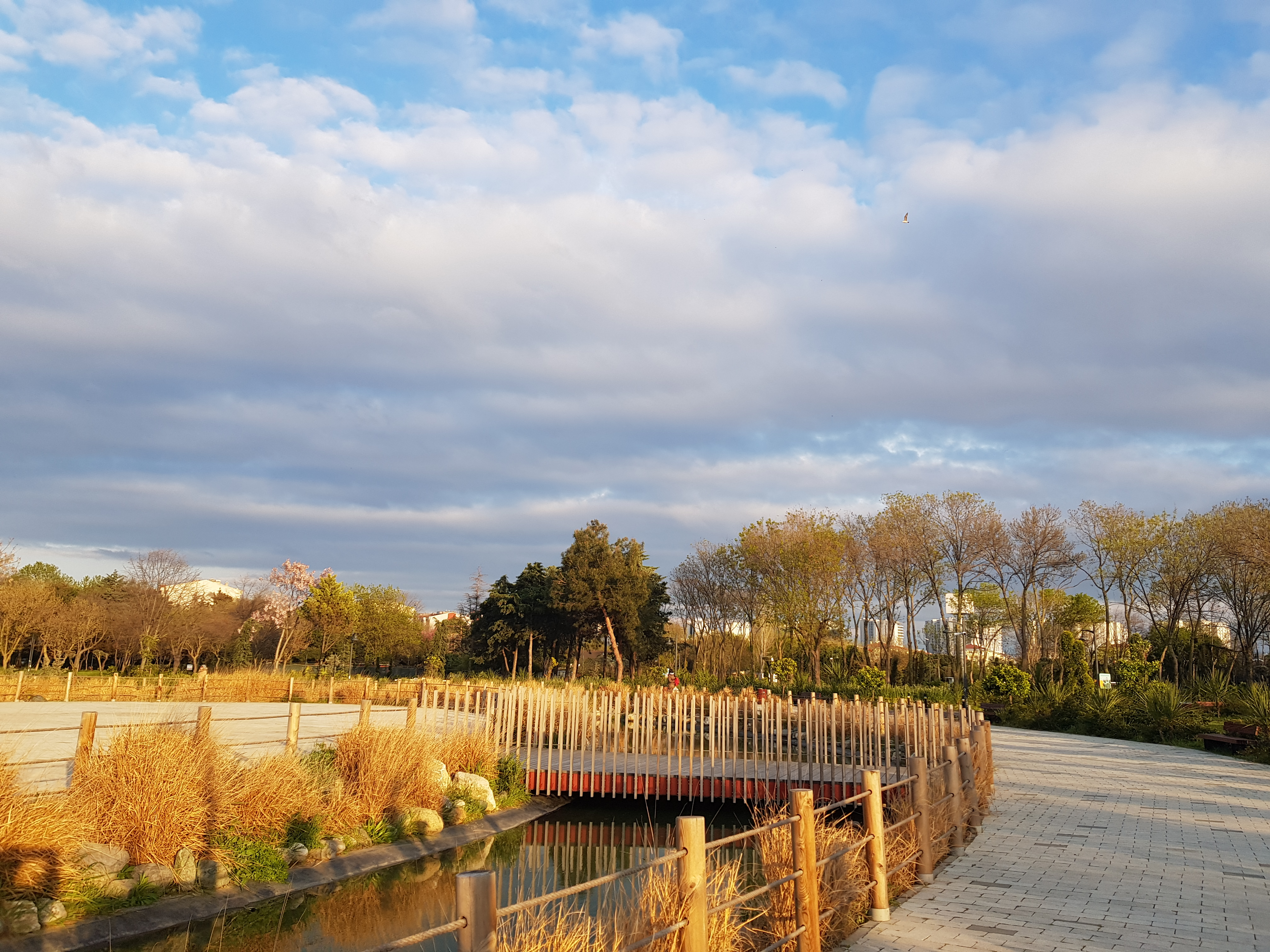
A general view of Ayamama Life Valley

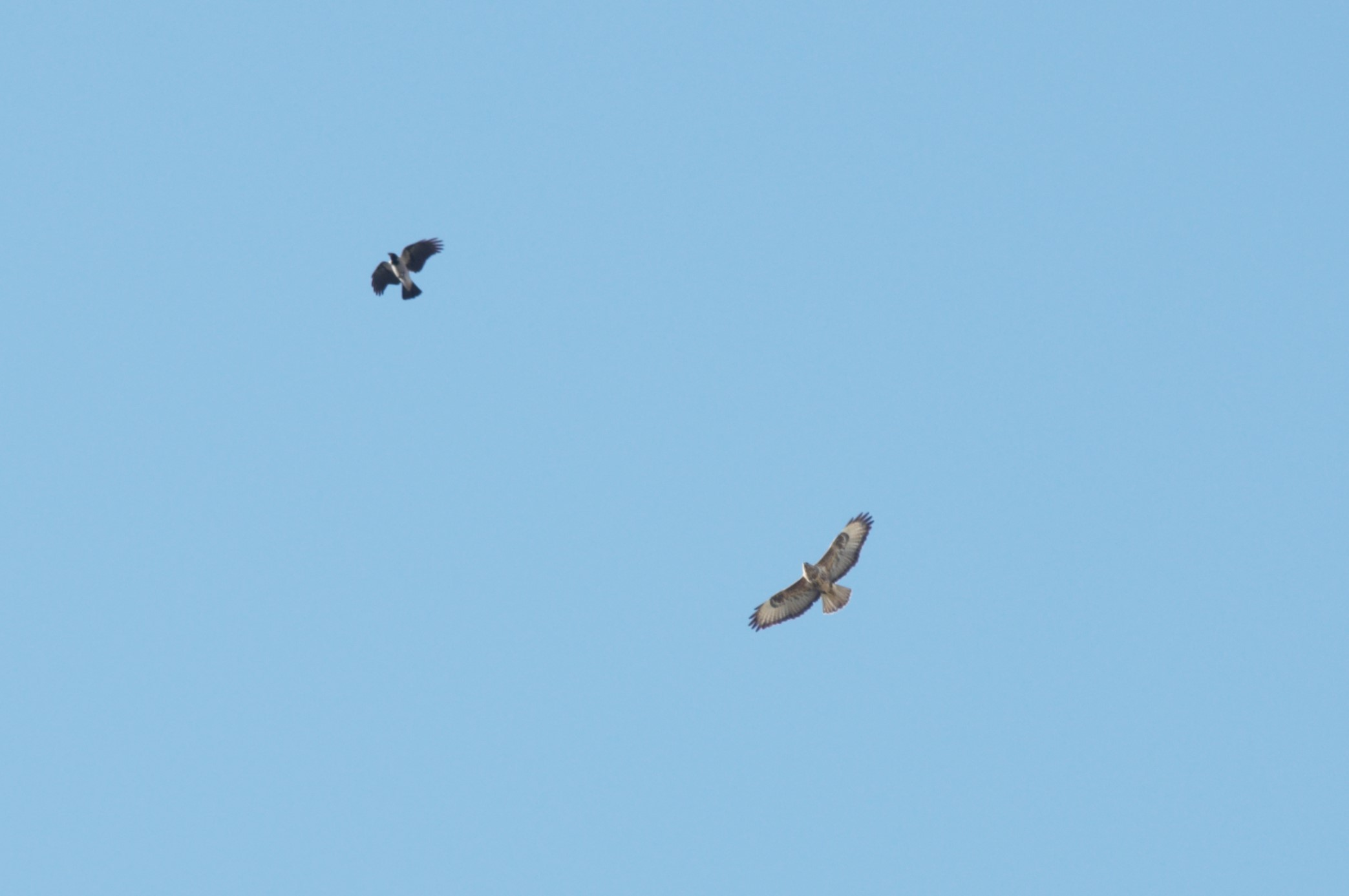
A common buzzard mobbed by a crow in Ayamama Life Valley
