= Mustafa Kemal railway station =

Train stop in western Istanbul

Mustafa Kemal
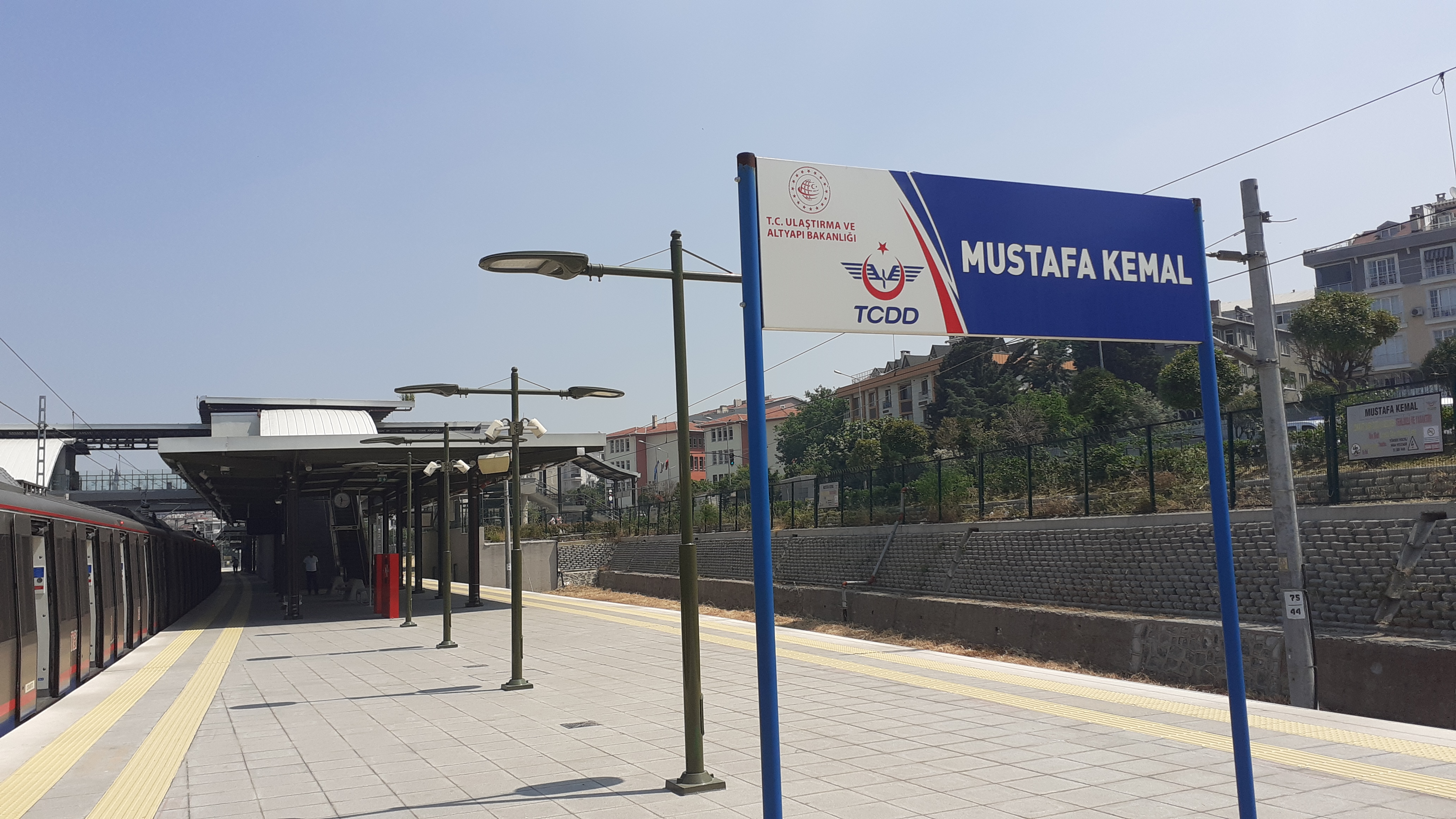

General information
- Location: İstasyon Cd., Cumhuriyet Mah., 34290; Küçükçekmece, Istanbul; Turkey
- Coordinates: 41.001926°N 28.769266°E
- System: TCDD Taşımacılık commuter rail station
- Owner: Turkish State Railways
- Operator: TCDD Taşımacılık
- Line: Istanbul-Pythion railway
- Platforms: 1 island platform
- Tracks: 3
- Connections: İETT Bus: 143, BN1; Istanbul Minibus: Deprem Konutları-Küçükçekmece, Küçükçekmece-Kayaşehir

Construction
- Structure type: At-grade
- Parking: No
- Accessible: Yes

History
- Opened: 4 December 1955
- Closed: 2013-19
- Electrified: 25 kV AC, 50 Hz OL

Services
Preceding station	TCDD Taşımacılık	Following station
Halkalı Terminus	Marmaray	Küçükçekmece towards Gebze
Former services
Preceding station	Turkish State Railways	Following station
Kanarya towards Halkalı	Istanbul suburban	Küçükçekmece towards Sirkeci
Location

Mustafa Kemal station (Turkish: Mustafa Kemal istasyonu), known as Soğuksu station until 2013, is a railway station on the Marmaray commuter rail line, in Istanbul, Turkey. It is located in Cumhuriyet neighborhood of Küçükçekmece district. The station is situated on İstasyon Street, east of Lake Küçükçekmece.

The station was opened on 4 December 1955 for the start of commuter service between Sirkeci and Halkalı. In 2013, the station was closed down when commuter service was temporarily suspended for the rehabilitation of the railway and its stations. It was demolished and rebuilt with an expected opening date of 2015. However, due to numerous delays, the station did not reopen until 12 March 2019. Soğuksu is located 25.2 km (15.7 mi) from Sirkeci station, and 2.4 km (1.5 mi) from Halkalı station. Soğuksu was closed in 2013 due to the rehabilitation and construction of the new Marmaray line.
