= Florya =

Quarter in Bakırköy, Istanbul, Turkey

Coordinates: 40.97°N 28.79°E

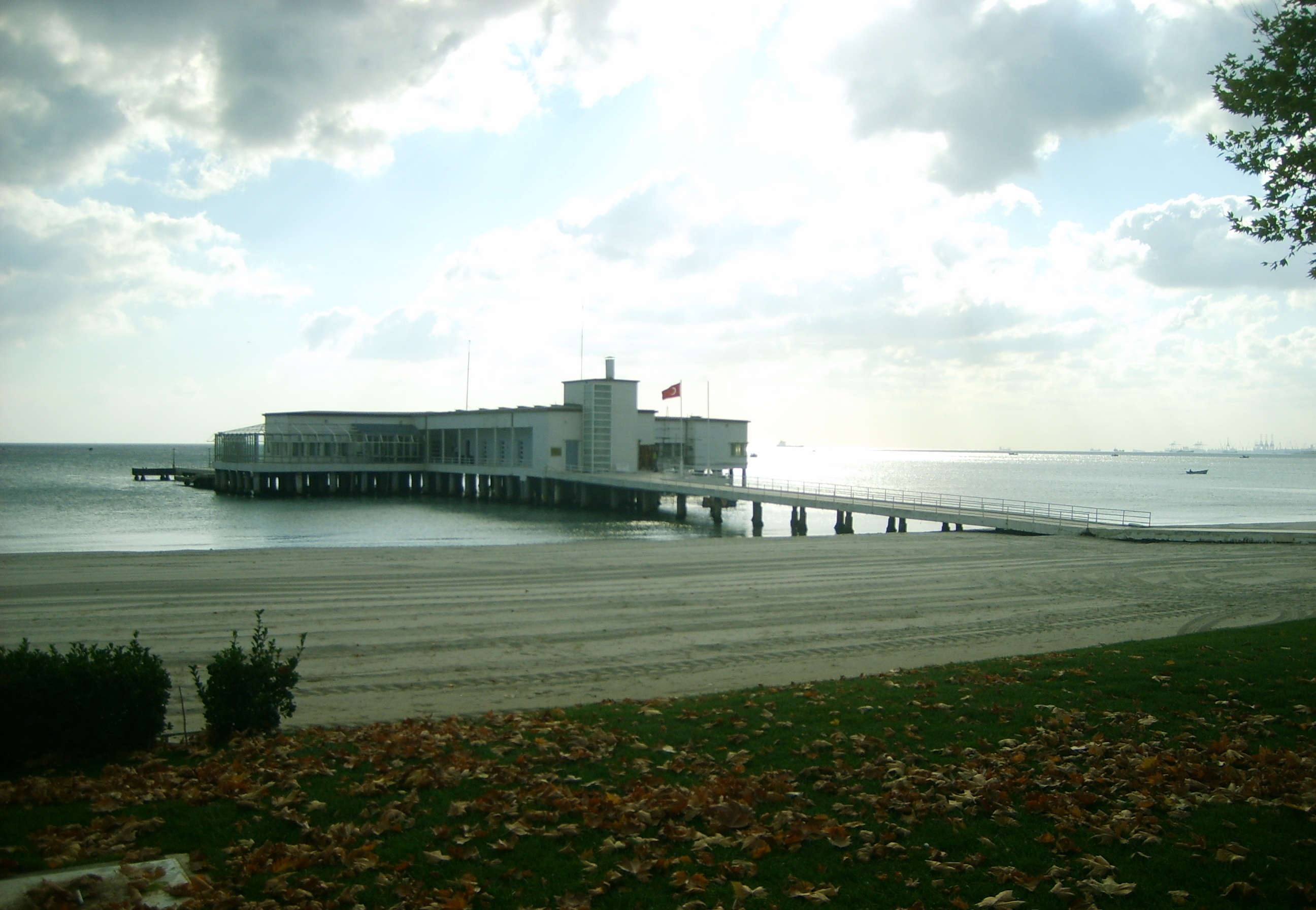
Atatürk marine mansion in Florya

Florya is a quarter (Turkish: semt) belonging to the Bakırköy district of the greater Istanbul, Turkey. It is located along Marmara Sea, and borders to the northeast the neighborhood of Yeşilköy, to the northwest that of Küçükçekmece. Its residents are relatively affluent. Florya has two stations along the Marmaray Commuter Line: Florya and Florya Akvaryum.

Mustafa Kemal Atatürk, the founder and the first president of Turkey, used to spend his free time in his Florya Atatürk Marine Mansion swimming and enjoying the beautiful sandy beach.

== Name ==
Florya's name, according to the Byzantine scholar Michael Psellos, who found it cited in an imperial Chrysobull, comes from the Greek word "Phlorion" (Φλώριον). It is possibly derived from a certain Florus, who lived in this neighborhood during the early Byzantine age. Until the 1920s the Ottoman name was "Fülürye".

Florya has two neighbourhoods: Şenlikköy and Basınköy

== Facilities ==
The Atatürk Marine Mansion, once summer residence of Mustafa Kemal Atatürk and a museum today, is located at the shore of Marmara Sea.

Famous sports club Galatasaray SK has the club's training facilities in Florya. Also İstanbul Super Amateur League team Bakırköyspor plays its home games in Şenlikköy Stadium, which is located in Florya.

Florya Koleji, İstek Vakfı, İlke Koleji, Bahçeşehir Koleji are some of the local private colleges.

== Economy ==
Airlines such as Freebird Airlines have their head office in Florya. Onur Air previously had its head office in Florya.

== Sources ==
- Janin, Raymond (1964). Constantinople Byzantine (in French) (2 ed.). Paris: Institut Français d'Etudes Byzantines.
