= Florya Atatürk Marine Mansion =

- Florya Atatürk Deniz Köşkü
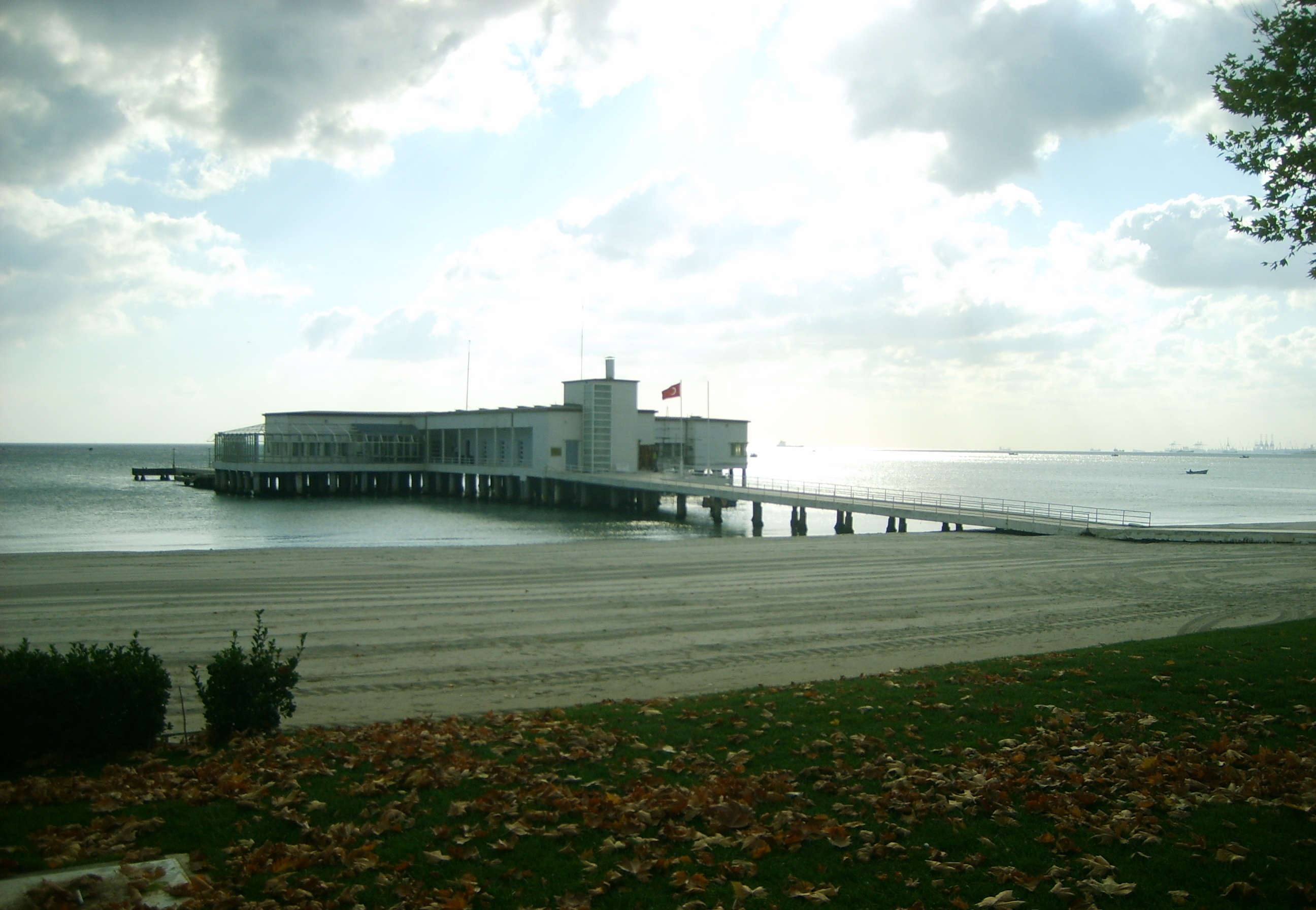
- View of the mansion from the beach

- Location of Florya Atatürk Marine Mansion
- Established: 1935; 91 years ago
- Location: Florya, Bakırköy, Istanbul, Turkey
- Coordinates: 40.97260°N 28.78254°E
- Type: Historic house museum
- Architect: Seyfi Arkan
- Website: Official Web page

Florya Atatürk Marine Mansion (Turkish: Florya Atatürk Deniz Köşkü) is a historic presidential residence located offshore in the Sea of Marmara in the Florya neighborhood of the Bakırköy district in Istanbul, Turkey.

It was built in 1935 by the municipality of Istanbul for Mustafa Kemal Atatürk's recreational use. The building is a historic house museum today.

== Architecture ==
Designed in the Bauhaus style by architect Seyfi Arkan, who was given the commission in 1935 by the municipality of Istanbul, the mansion was completed on August 14 the same year, and was gifted to Atatürk.

The building is constructed on steel piles driven into the seabed and is connected to the sandy beach about 70 m (230 ft) away with a wooden pier. The L-shaped, one-floor mansion consists of a reception hall, a reading room, bedrooms and bathroom. There are also service and staff rooms at the complex. The total area covered by the mansion including the pier is 602 m^{2} (6,480 sq ft).

A grove was created in the yard of the ruined Agios Stefanos Monastery as the garden for the mansion on Atatürk's taking possession. This grove is called "Florya Atatürk Grove" (Turkish: Florya Atatürk Korusu) and is today a public park. The mansion is considered an example of "Turkish Early Republican architecture".

== History ==
During the period he stayed at Dolmabahçe Palace, Atatürk came to the mansion by boat and enjoyed swimming surrounded by local people. He used the mansion for the last three years of his life as a summer office as well as for recreation. In 1936, he stayed from June 6 until July 28 at the mansion. His last stay was on May 28, 1938, about six months before his death.

The mansion was also used for important receptions and scientific meetings. Among its famous visitors were Prince Edward, Duke of Windsor and his wife Wallis, Duchess of Windsor.

Following the death of Atatürk, Turkish presidents such as İsmet İnönü, Celal Bayar, Cemal Gürsel, Cevdet Sunay, Fahri Korutürk and Kenan Evren used the Florya Mansion as a summer residence.

== Museum ==
Due to the encroaching urban development and the consequent pollution of the sea at the site, the mansion fell into disuse as an official residence. On September 6, 1988, the building was handed over to the National Palaces Department of the Turkish Grand National Assembly. It was then renovated and opened in 1993 to the public as a museum. A section of the mansion is reserved as a social facility for members of parliament.

The museum exhibits furniture, tableware, personal belongings including swimwear, as well as a collection of Atatürk's photographs taken at the site.

== Location and access ==
The museum is situated west of Atatürk International Airport on the coastal road from Florya to Küçükçekmece.

It can be reached from Florya train station on the Istanbul-Halkalı commuter line, which is about 500 m (1,600 ft) away. Bus line "73T Yenibosna Metro-Florya" of İETT serves the location as well.

The museum is open from 9 am to 4 pm (in winter months from 9 am to 3 pm) local time except Mondays and Thursdays.

== See also ==
- Atatürk Museums in Turkey
