= Seyfi Arkan =

Turkish architect (1903–1966)

Abdurrahman Seyfettin Arkan, Seyfi Nasih (1903 – 15 July 1966) was a Turkish architect, the personal architect of Mustafa Kemal Atatürk. He was born in 1903 in Istanbul. He attended Kadikoy French School and Galatasaray High School. He was first in his class under Vedat Tek in 1928, and later worked with Hans Poelzig in Germany. In 1933, he designed the Glass Villa of Çankaya Köşkü, the President of Turkey's official residence, as well as Florya Atatürk Marine Mansion, a Bauhaus-style former residence of Atatürk and now a museum, in 1935.

== Early life and career ==
Arkan was born in 1903 in Istanbul, Turkey. Following the completion of primary education in Kadikoy French School, received secondary education at Galatasaray High School. He began the architecture education in Sanayi-i Nefise Mektebi, the Academy of Fine Arts graduated from Vedat Tek Warehouse in 1928. After received the degree in Canakkale Monument Competition, he was sent to Europe to continue his education by the Ministry of National Education. He became one of the students of Hans Poelzig from 1929 to 1932, and he worked in his workshop. He researched about the field of school buildings workers' habitats and stadiums during his education process within Europe. Seyfi Arkan had come back to Turkey in 1933, and he started to work urbanism studies at Academy of fine arts as an instructor. Poelzing modern perspective on architecture and Berlin's socio-cultural structure influenced Arkan's architectural studies at the large extent. In addition, some of the most important factors which Arkan considered during his project are Turkey's economic and social condition during the 1930s and 1940s. Seyfi Arkan, was the winner of the Çankaya Hariciye Kosku contest which held in 1933. After that, he did many project as private architecture of Atatürk.

== His awarded project ==
- 25,000 Capacity Stadium Cebeci Architectural Competition, 2nd Prize, 1957.
- Ankara Ulus Square Hotel and Is Bank, Architectural Design Competition, Honorable Mention 5, 1956.
- Turkey Anafartalar Is Bank Office Building (Bank, Hotel and Theatre Building) Architectural Design Competition, Honorable Mention 5, 1955.
- Trabzon Exhibition House Architectural Competition, 3rd Prize, 1946.
- Teacher's Dormitory, 1st Prize, 1946.
- Turkey Grand National Assembly Building, 4th Prize, 1938.
- Winter and Summer Turkey Embassy Building and Interior Design Competition in Tehran and Simran, 1st Prize, 1937.
- Istanbul Port Galata Passenger Lounge (Garmarit I) Architectural Design Competition, 1st Prize, 1936.
- Sümerbank General Directorate Building, 1st Prize, 1935.
- Bank of Provinces (Municipalities) Architectural Design Competition, 1st Prize, 1935.
- Florya Atatürk Marine Mansion, 1st Prize, 1934.
- Harıcıye Kosku, 1st Prize, 1933
