= Küçükçekmece railway station =

Train stop in western Istanbul

Küçükçekmece
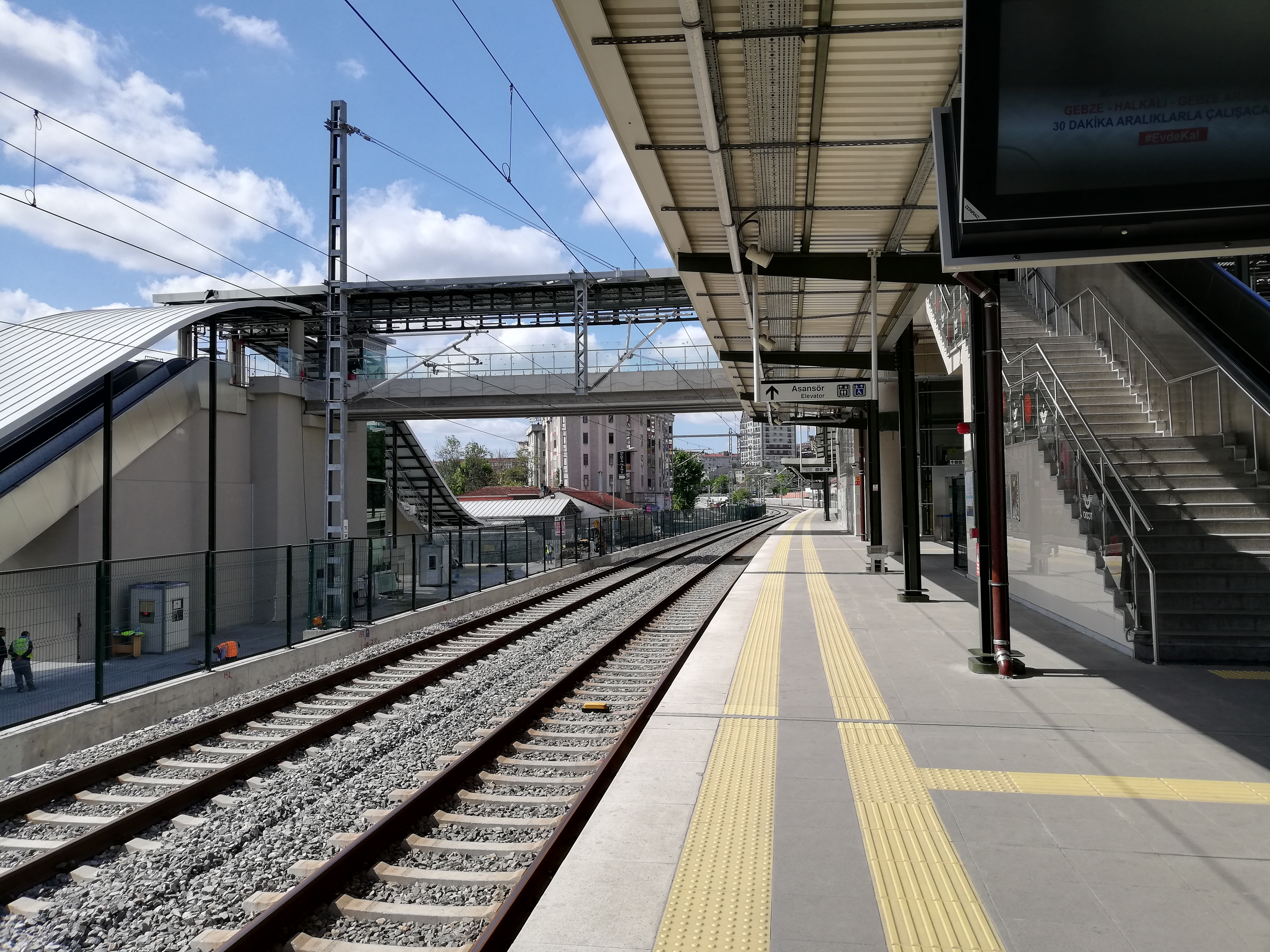

General information
- Location: İstanbul Cd., Fatih Mah. 34290; Küçükçekmece, Istanbul; Turkey
- Coordinates: 40.9885°N 28.7728°E
- Owner: Turkish State Railways
- Operator: TCDD Taşımacılık
- Line: Istanbul-Pythion railway
- Platforms: 1 island platform
- Tracks: 3
- Connections: İETT Bus: 98TB, 143, BN1, MK16 İstanbul Minibüs: Kayaşehir-İkitelli-Küçükçekmece, Küçükçekmece-Deprem Konutları, Küçükçekmece-Hadımköy, Küçükçekmece-Kayaşehir, Küçükçekmece-Kıraç, Küçükçekmece-Örnek Mahallesi, Küçükçekmece-Tevfik Bey Mahallesi, Küçükçekmece-Cihangir Mahallesi, Küçükçekmece-İNSA Sitesi, Küçükçekmece-İhlas Marmara Evleri, Küçükçekmece-Beylikdüzü Toplu Konutları, Küçükçekmece-Avcılar-Balık Yolu, Küçükçekmece-Balık Yolu, Küçükçekmece-Haramidere, Küçükçekmece - Balık Yolu - Kıraç, Küçükçekmece-Kıraç 2, Küçükçekmece-Deliklikaya, Küçükçekmece-Boğazköy, Küçükçekmece-Karaağaç, Küçükçekmece-Saadetdere Mahallesi-Kıraç, Küçükçekmece-Erzurum Kongre Cad.-Kıraç

Construction
- Parking: No
- Accessible: Yes

History
- Opened: 22 July 1872
- Closed: 2013-18
- Rebuilt: 1955, 2016-18
- Electrified: 1955; 25 kV AC, 50 Hz Overhead wire

Services
Preceding station	TCDD Taşımacılık	Following station
Mustafa Kemal towards Halkalı	Marmaray	Florya towards Gebze
Former services
Preceding station	Turkish State Railways	Following station
Soğuksu towards Halkalı	Istanbul suburban	Menekşe towards Sirkeci
Location

Küçükçekmece railway station (Turkish: Küçükçekmece istasyonu) is a railway station in Küçükçekmece, Istanbul. The station was originally built in 1872 by the Oriental Railway. In 1955, the station was rebuilt as a stop on the Istanbul suburban commuter rail line until 2013, when the entire line was closed down for expansion and renovation. Küçükçekmece station was demolished as a new one was built just south of the former platform and a third track was added. The new station entered service on 12 March 2019 and became a stop on the Marmaray commuter rail line.
