= Carousel Shopping Center =

Shopping mall in Bakırköy, Istanbul

Coordinates: 40°58′41″N 28°52′26″E

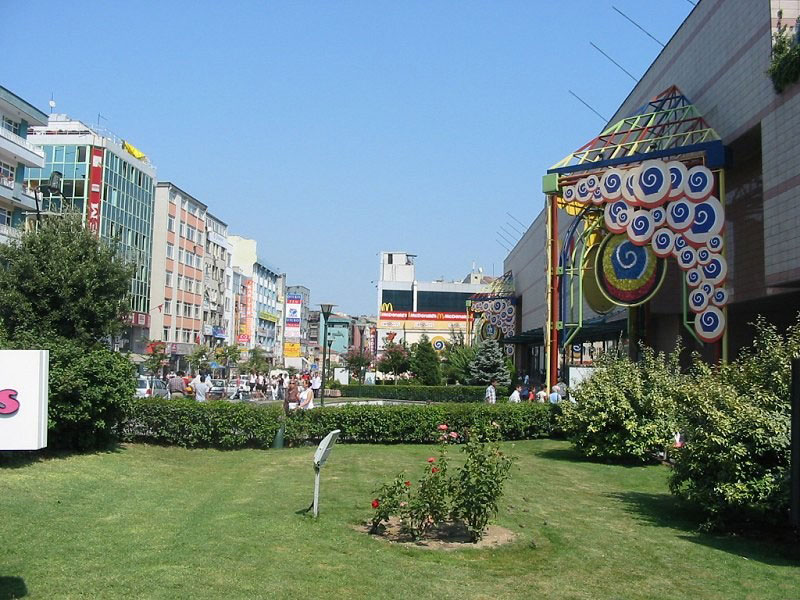
- Location: Bakırköy, Istanbul, Turkey
- Opened: September 29, 1995; 31 years ago
- Developer: Baymer
- Num. of stores: 107
- Num. of anchor tenants: 8
- Floor area: 24,400 square metres (263,000 sq ft)
- Parking: 750
- Website: www.carousel.com.tr

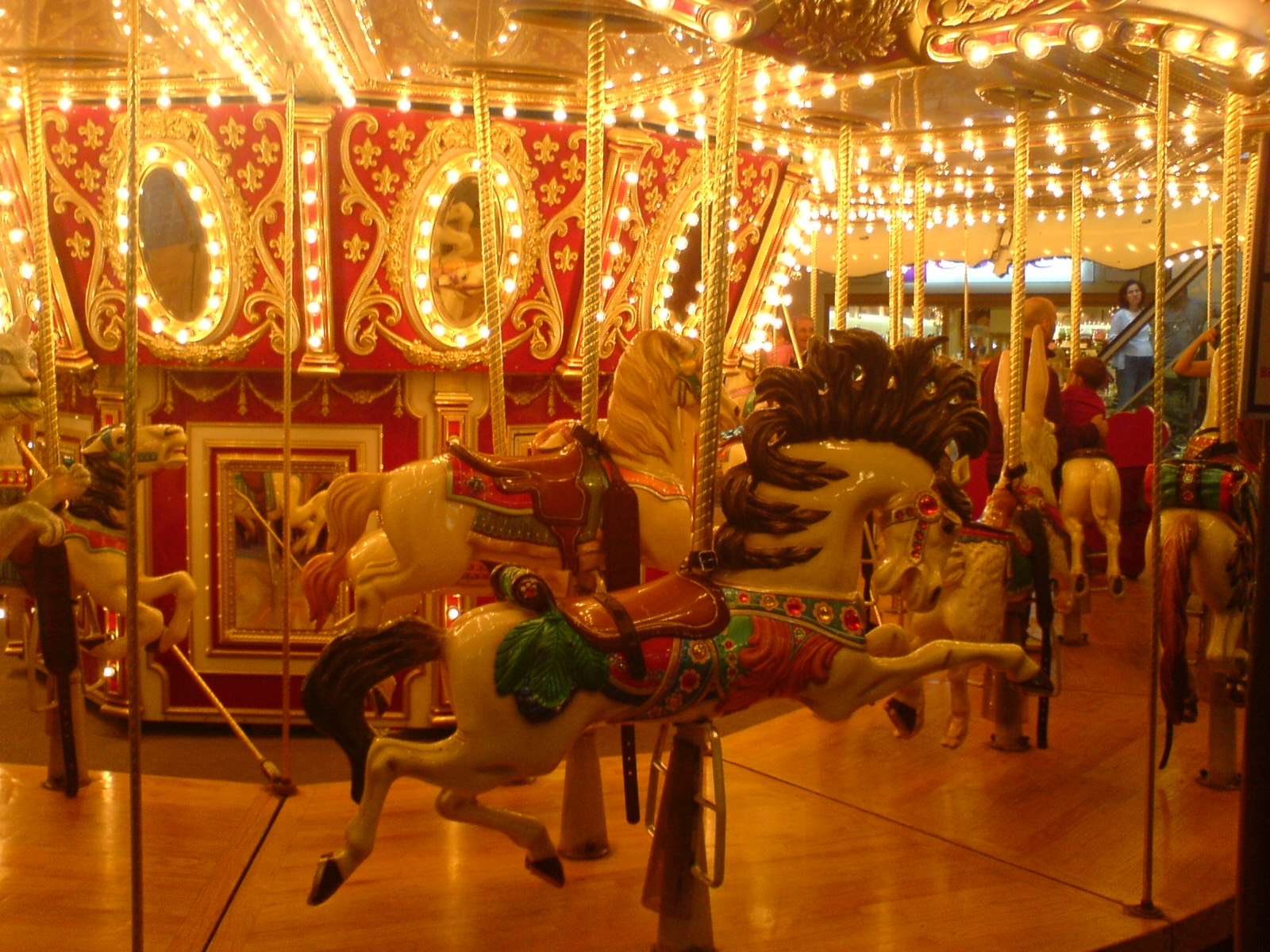
Carousel platform which the shopping center is named after.

Carousel Shopping Center (Turkish: Carousel Alışveriş ve Yaşam Merkezi), opened in 1995, is a modern shopping mall located in the Bakırköy district of Istanbul, Turkey.

The shopping center with its 76,500 m² area has 117 shops, fast food restaurants, cafeterias, an entertainment center, and movie theaters. There are 7 elevators and 12 escalators providing easy access to 1.5 million visitors monthly. Car parking is free for the shoppers.

Its attractions include discussion panels, music recitals, an art gallery where exhibitions by both amateur and professional artists are held, book-signing sessions by famous authors, and special weeks featuring different countries.

In 1996, Carousel was honored with "Jean-Louis Solal Marketing Award" of the International Council of Shopping Centers (ICSC).

== See also ==
- List of shopping malls in Istanbul
