= Bakırköy Synagogue =

Synagogue in Istanbul, Turkey

- Location of the synagogue in Istanbul

Religion
- Affiliation: Judaism
- Rite: Nusach Sefard
- Ecclesiastical or organisational status: Synagogue
- Status: Active

Location
- Location: Cumhuriyet Avenue, Bakırköy, Istanbul, Istanbul Province
- Country: Turkey
- Coordinates: 40°58′42″N 28°52′15″E

Architecture
- Type: Synagogue architecture
- Completed: 1914; 1960 (renovations)
- Materials: Brick

The Bakırköy Synagogue is a Jewish congregation and synagogue, located on Cumhuriyet Avenue, in Bakırköy, Istanbul, in the Istanbul Province of Turkey. Completed in the early 20th century, the synagogue is open, yet only open for Shabbat services.

Established in 1914 by Sephardic Jews from Edirne through the efforts of Moshe Pinhas and Moshe Behar Hak, during World War II the synagogue was used for profane purposes, and then returned to the Jewish community after the war.

== See also ==
- History of the Jews in Turkey
- List of synagogues in Turkey
