= Cistern of the Hebdomon =

- Fildamı Sarnıcı
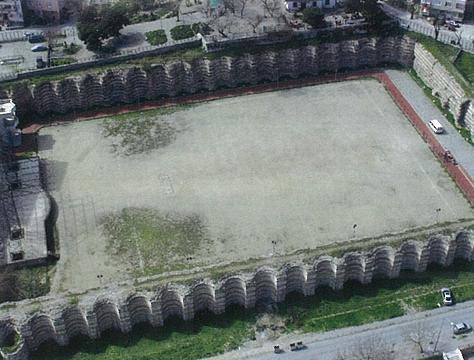

- Location within Istanbul
- 40°59′35″N 28°53′10″E
- Type: Cistern
- Periods: Byzantine Empire
- Location: Bakırköy, Istanbul, Turkey
- Region: Marmara Region

The Cistern of the Hebdomon (Greek: κινστέρνη τοῦ Ἕβδομου), known in Turkish as Fildamı Sarnıcı ("Cistern of the elephant's stable"), is a Byzantine open sky water reservoir built in the quarter of the Hebdomon (today's Bakırköy), an outskirt of Constantinople.

== Location ==
The cistern is located in Istanbul, in the district of Bakırköy, in the mahalle of Osmaniye, between Fildamı Arkası and Çoban çeşme Sokak, to the northwest of the Veli Efendi horse race track. Topographically, it lies about 2 km west of the Golden Gate of the Walls of Constantinople, in the western part of a small valley – now completely built up – which runs southwards to the Marmara sea.

== History ==
The date of construction of this cistern, which lay in the outskirts of the Hebdomon (Greek: Ἕβδομον, "the Seventh", so called because of its location seven Roman miles from the Milion, the mile-marker monument of Constantinople), is uncertain, but can be placed from the fifth-sixth centuries to the eighth century. The size of the bricks suggests as a post quem date for its edification the end of Justinian I's reign (ruled 527–65), while the absence of brick stamps is typical of constructions erected after the end of the sixth century. Its function was certainly to supply water to the quarter's two imperial palaces bearing the name of Magnaura (Located at Hebdomon), erected by Emperor Valens (r. 364–78), and of Jucundianae, (also named Secundianae) built by Justinian I. Both palaces lay near the Marmara seashore, where nowadays the Ataköy Marina lies. The cistern was also used to supply water to the troops of the Thracian army using the nearby Field of Mars, named Kampos tou Tribounaliou (Greek: Κάμπος τοῦ τριβουναλίου), in Latin Campus Tribunalis. The Campus, where several Emperors were elected through acclamation by the army, lay in the valley of Veli Efendi, where now Istanbul's horse race track is placed.

After the Fall of Constantinople in 1453, the empty reservoir was used by the Ottomans as a stable for the Sultan's elephants, whence its Turkish names Filhane or Fildamı, meaning house or repair of the elephants. Afterwards, it was used as vegetable garden, becoming one of Istanbul's four Çukurbostan ("hollow garden") still extant, a use that ceased in 1996, when the cistern was acquired by the state and transformed into a concert arena for pop music with a capacity of 12,000 spectators. By 2003, it had become clear that the vibrations of the music were damaging the walls and disturbing the horses in the nearby race track, and the concerts ceased. Since then, the structure – administered by the belediye of Bakırköy – has been sporadically used to host meetings.

== Description ==
The cistern has a rectangular plan with sides 127 metres (417 ft) long and 76 metres (249 ft) wide, and covers an area of about 9,600 square metres (103,000 sq ft). It is slightly larger than the Basilica Cistern, and is the smallest among the four open-air cistern of Constantinople. Its average depth is about 11 metres (36 ft) on the inner side, but much less on the outer side, since the cistern, built above ground like all the open-air reservoirs of Constantinople, "sank" in the earth with time, as the level of the soil rose. The reservoir could contain about 0.105 million cubic metres (28 million US gallons) of water. Its walls, 4.10 metres (13.5 ft) thick in the northern and southern sides and 7.00 metres (22.97 ft) thick in the eastern and western sides, are still in place. They were built using the Roman construction technique opus listatum, by alternating courses of bricks and of stone in a ratio of five to two, except near the top, where it is five to four (or five)). The same pattern was also used to build the cisterns of Aetius, of Aspar and of Mocius inside the walled city of Costantinople. The outer western wall is buried in the hill, while the inner western wall and the outer eastern wall are reinforced with a series of nineteen semicircular projecting niches which create two buttresses, necessary to withstand the weight of the hill. Two stairways, today partially destroyed, and used to enter the mains, are built by the north and south side. Another interesting feature of the cistern is its water tower (Latin: Castellum aquae), built on the outer side of the south-western corner. This is a water tank used to stabilize the hydraulic pressure of an aqueduct by releasing water when its level drops beyond a specific value. The tower has a double shell structure, with a spiral staircase in the centre, separated from the outside by a casing containing the water flowing from an inflow placed at the bottom of the tower. Several outflow channels distributed the reservoir water in different directions. It is unknown whether the cistern, which lies at a low altitude, was supplied with water coming from the nearby springs, and whether this was sufficient to fill it, or whether the water came from an artificial channel from the Thracian hinterland.

In the same small valley where the cistern lies, and to its west, there are three smaller elliptic open cisterns, aligned from north to south. The central one is destroyed, while the other two, still extant, are named Domuzdamı ("house of the pigs"), since they were used as stables for animals.

== See also ==
- List of Roman cisterns

== Sources ==
- Mamboury, Ernest (1953). The Tourists' Istanbul. Istanbul: Çituri Biraderler Basımevi.
- Janin, Raymond (1964). Constantinople Byzantine (in French). Paris: Institut Français d'Etudes Byzantines.
- Altun, Feride Imrana (2009). Istanbul'un 100 Roma, Bizans Eseri (in Turkish). Istanbul: Istanbul Buyukșehir Belediyesi Kültür A.Ş. Yayınları. ISBN 978-9944-370-76-9.
- Cistern of Hebdomon, The byzantine legacy
- Serhat Goncal, Fildami cistern - its role in Constantinople
