= Camera Museum, Malatya =

Museum in Malatya, Turkey

- Fotoğraf Makinası Müzesi, Malatya
- Location of the museum in Turkey
- Established: 2017; 9 years ago
- Location: Malatya, Turkey
- Coordinates: 38.34841°N 38.29163°E
- Type: Photographic and photographic film cameras and accessories
- Collection size: 2,023 cameras and over 3,000 accessories
- Visitors: 120,000
- Founder: Malatya Metropolitan Municipality

The Camera Museum (Turkish: Fotoğraf Makinası Müzesi) is a museum in Malatya, Turkey, exhibiting various cameras. It is the country's biggest museum of photographic technology. Established in 2017, it is the biggest museum of its art in Europe and Asia, and ranks third in the world in terms of its collection size.

The museum was established in 2017 with the initiative of the Malatya Metropolitan Municipality Mayor Ahmet Çakır by donation of the collection of Engineer Baki Tamer Selçuk, a camera repairman and collector. The museum features 2,023 cameras, including spy cameras, dated from 1876 to today in 44 different segments, over 3,000 accessories in 55 various segments, a cinema and projection room, a darkroom as well as two souvenir shooting corners for indoor and outdoor shots. It is visited by around 120,000 tourists yearly. On average, 50% of the visitors are locals, 35% are domestic and the rest is foreign tourists, who come especially in the summer time.

== See also ==
- Camera Museum, Istanbul
