= Ataköy Gunpowder Mill =

Historical complex in Atakoy, Istanbul, Turkey

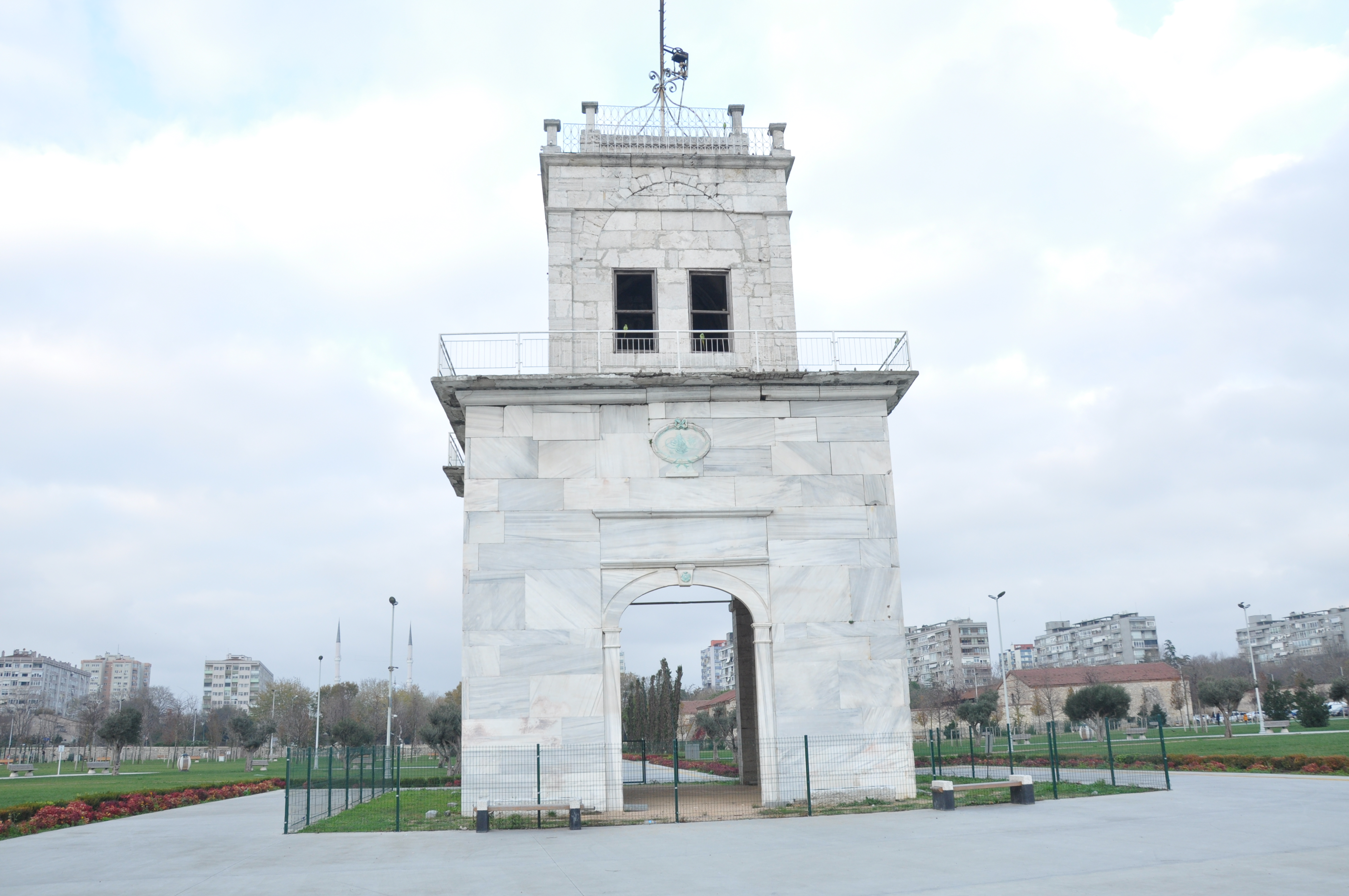
- The tower of Atakoy Gunpowder in 2021
- Established: 1700; 326 years ago
- Location: Atakoy, Bakırköy, Istanbul
- Coordinates: 40°58′32″N 28°51′36″E
- Architect: unknown

Ataköy Gunpowder Mill (Baruthane-i Âmire in Ottoman Turkish) is a historical complex that is located on Ataköy, Bakırköy, Istanbul. It is administratively under Istanbul Metropolitan Municipality, and is close to Bakırköy Sahil (Istanbul Metro).

== History ==
After the fall of Constantinople Ottoman Turks had built some gunpowder mills in there. The first gunpowder mill in the Ottoman capital served in what was once Hippodrome of Constantinople until 1490. Then, due to safety it was decided to move the new gunpowder mill outside Constantinople, and it was built in Kağıthane, and operated until the end of Ibrahim I's reign. Another gunpowder mill was built in Şehremini, inside Constantinople but it and the surrounding area were destroyed by the explosion of stored gunpowder. Thus, it was for certain determined to build a gunpowder mill outside Constantinople, and select the garden of İskender Çelebi what is now in Bakırköy. In Makriköy (Bakırköy) İskender Çelebi, a 16th-century defterdar in Ottoman Empire, had created a vast garden. Why the gunpowder mill was constructed in the garden what is Ataköy now are that there was a stream near the garden for gunpowder production, and that the garden of İskender Çelebi was safe due to its location outside Constantinople. In 1700 the Ottomans completed to build the new gunpowder mill in Makriköy that was funded by Muqata'ah revenue in Gümüşhane and Imperial Treasury. The operations of this complex were disrupted so many times by some fires. After a fire danger it survived in October 1791, it was completely built of stone as a precautionary measure. In 1793 Selim III ordered the Ministry of Gunpowder Mill to be founded in order to make new arrangements for the gunpowder production. Throughout 18th century this gunpowder mill produced approximately 85-160 tonnes of gunpowder per year, but the quality of the gunpowder produced was always a matter of debate. In 19th century this gunpowder mill was equipped with new machines in order to improve the gunpowder production. In Tanzimat this complex was affiliated to Ministry of War (Ottoman Empire), and given under command of Tophane Commandership. In the Mahmud II's reign, Dad Arakel, an Armenian-Ottoman officer, was appointed to the complex as a director, and then his sons, Ohannes and Bogos that were called Dadyan, continued managing the gunpowder mill. It was recorded that after appointment of Armenian officers in Makriköy the Armenian population reached up to 100 houses. Ani İpekkaya, a Turkish-Armenian actress, stated that children and women in the neighborhood went to Ayazma (Holy well) in the gunpowder mill's estate to drink holy waters and go for a picnic.

The complex continued their operations until the end of the Ottoman Empire, and was transferred to military factories and Mechanical and Chemical Industry Corporation respectively, after proclamation of the republic. In 1955 the complex, that covered 4,000,000 m^{2}, was sold to Emlak Kredi Bank, and in 1957 at some parts of the estate of the gunpowder mill, Ataköy sites were begun to be constructed. In 1977 Ataköy Touristical Facilities managed this area a while, then at north part of its estate, historical buildings were restored, and transformed to Yunus Emre Cultural Centre in 1993 by Bakırköy Municipality.

== Developments ==
In 2018 TOKİ transferred the land of 60,000 m^{2} that, was remained from the gunpowder mill, to Istanbul Metropolitan Municipality, and it was turned into a city park, that is called Baruthane Millet Bahçesi. In 2024 Istanbul Metropolitan Municipality also renovated other historical buildings of it, and functionalized these buildings as museum, theatre hall, and library. The library includes 8,000 books, has a seating capacity of 110 people.

== Gallery ==
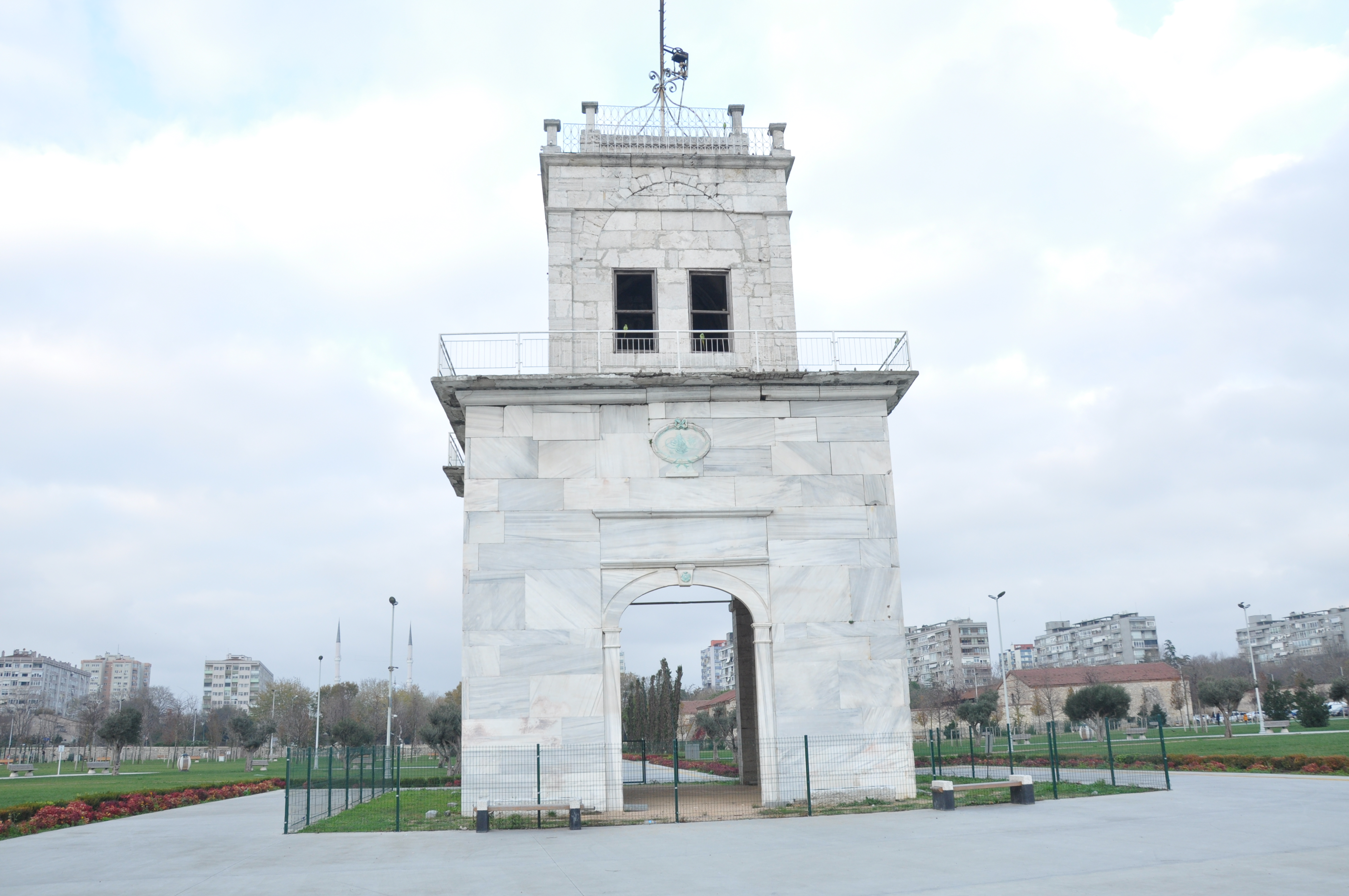
The historical tower near the Marmara sea

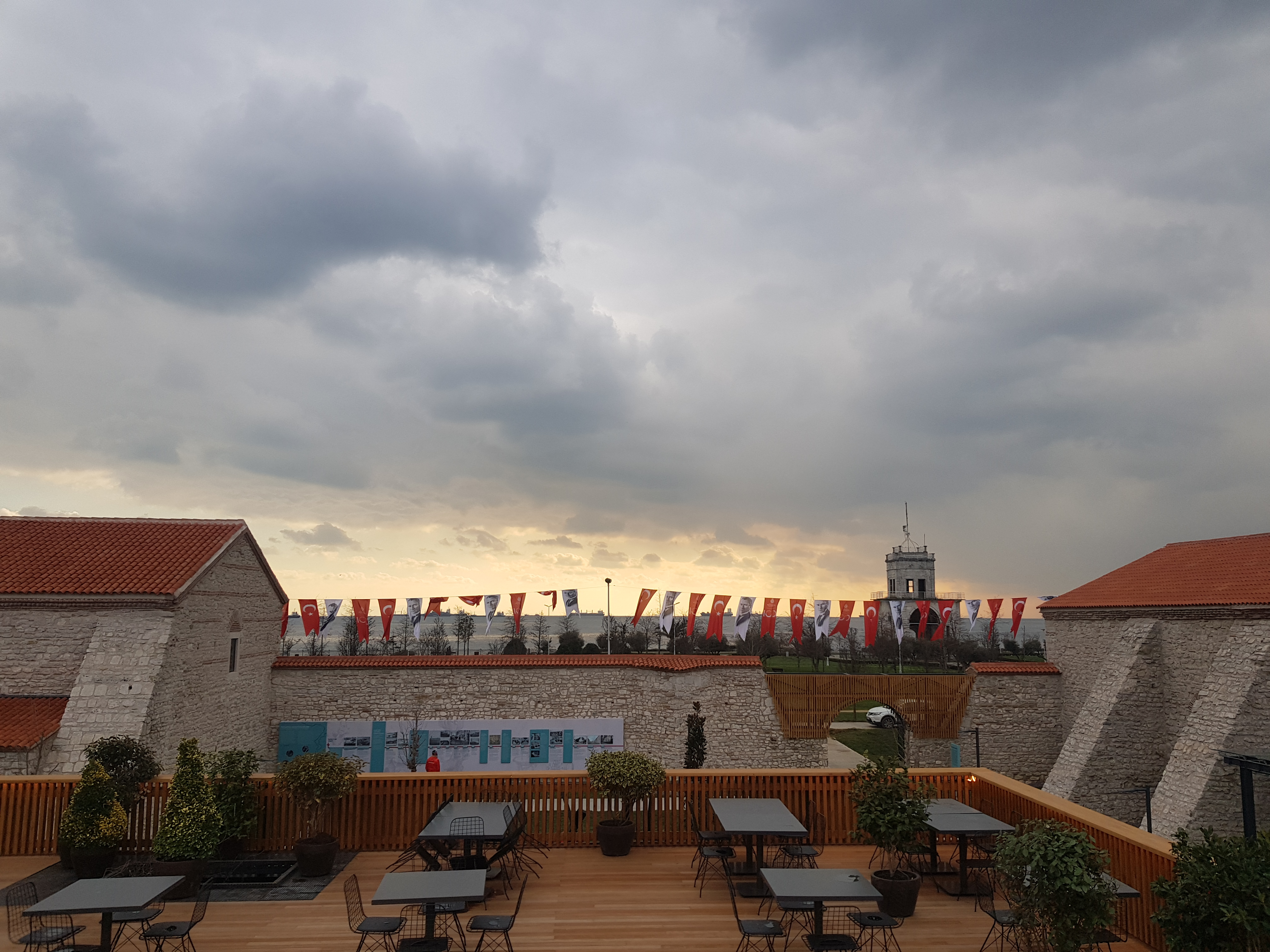
The courtyard of Atakoy Gunpowder

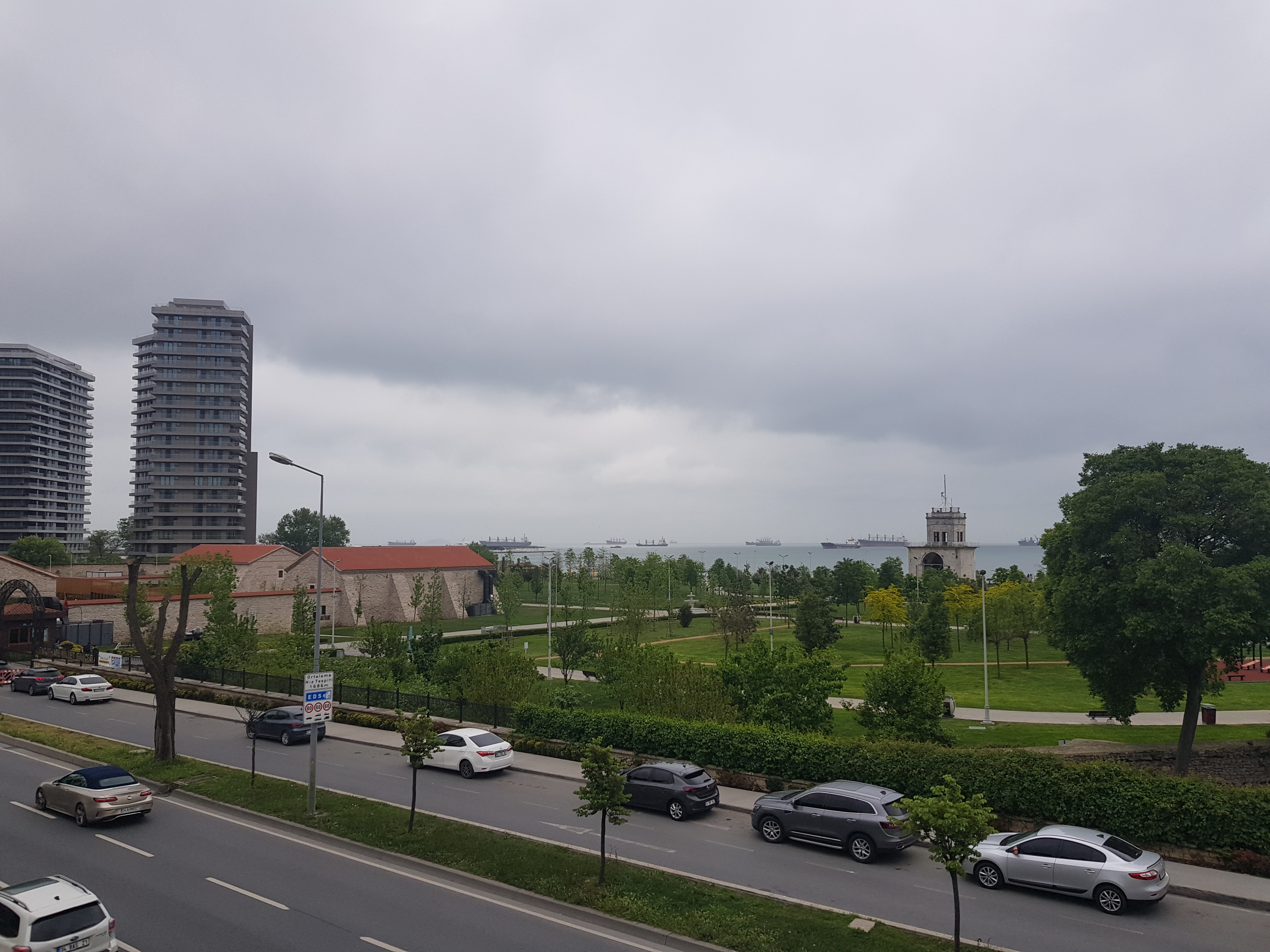
Restored Atakoy Gunpowder complex in the new park
