= Florya railway station =

Railway station in Istanbul, Turkey

Florya
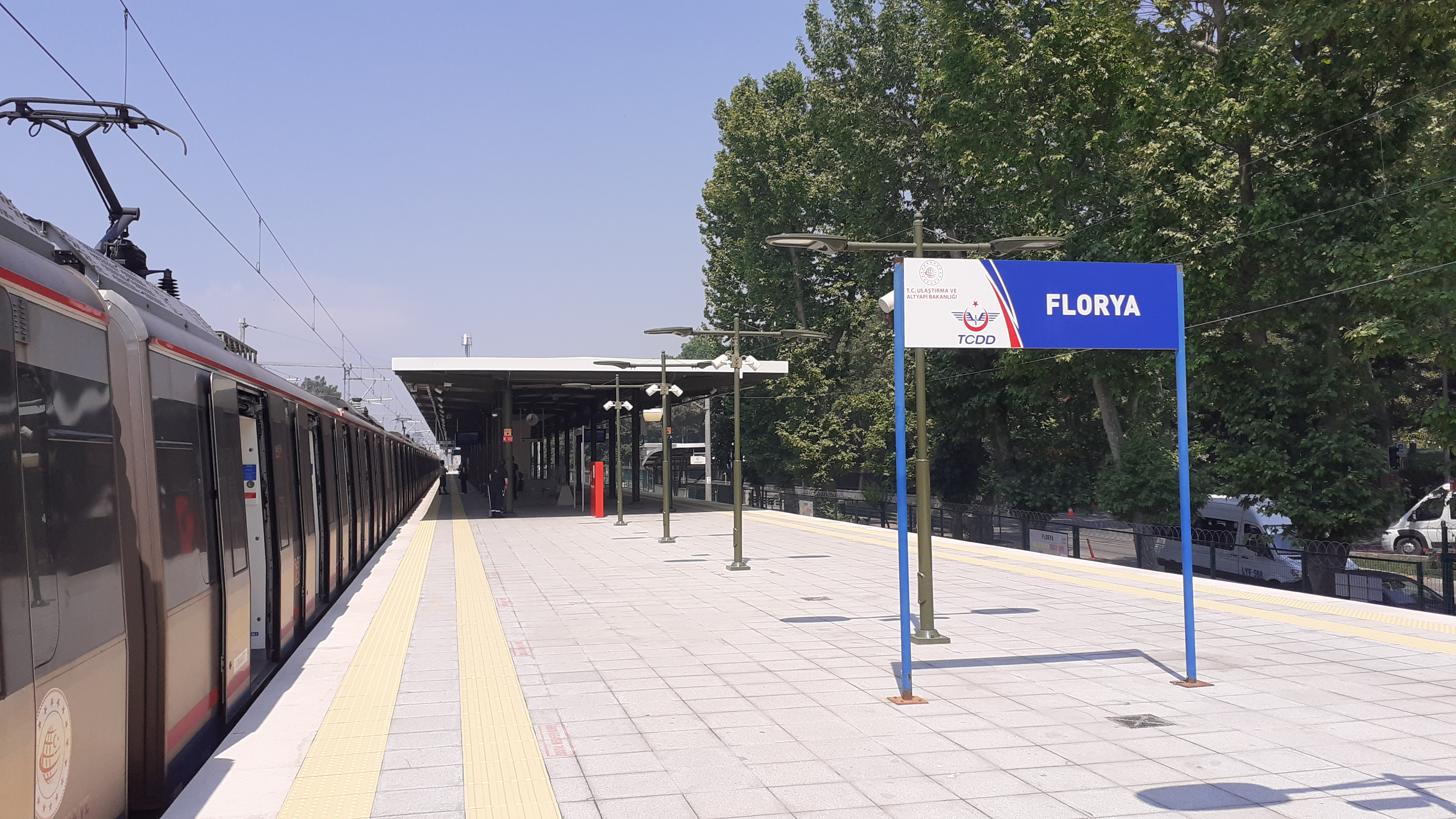

General information
- Location: Basınköy, Valilik Yolu Cd., 34153; Bakırköy, Istanbul; Turkey
- Coordinates: 40.9729°N 28.7873°E
- Owner: Turkish State Railways
- Operator: TCDD Taşımacılık
- Line: Istanbul-Pythion railway
- Platforms: 1 island platform
- Tracks: 3
- Connections: İETT Bus: 73B, BN1, BN2 İstanbul Minibüs Sefaköy-Florya İstanbul Dolmuş Taksim-Florya

Construction
- Parking: No
- Accessible: Yes

History
- Opened: 22 July 1872 (Chemins de fer Orientaux); 4 December 1955 (Istanbul suburban); 12 March 2019 (Marmaray)
- Closed: 2013-18
- Rebuilt: 2016-18
- Electrified: 1955; 25 kV AC, 50 Hz Overhead wire

Services
Preceding station	TCDD Taşımacılık	Following station
Küçükçekmece towards Halkalı	Marmaray	Florya Akvaryum towards Gebze
Former services
Preceding station	Turkish State Railways	Following station
Menekşe towards Halkalı	Istanbul suburban	Yeşilköy towards Sirkeci
Location

Florya railway station (Turkish: Florya istasyonu) is a railway station in Bakırköy, Istanbul. The station was built in 1955 as a stop on the Istanbul suburban commuter rail line until 2013, when the entire line was closed down for expansion and renovation. Florya station was demolished and rebuilt in order to accommodate for a third track. The new station entered service in the beginning of 2019 and became a stop on the Marmaray commuter rail line.

The station was used by the public to access the Florya beach, a popular city beach in Istanbul.
