= Bakırköy =

- District and municipality
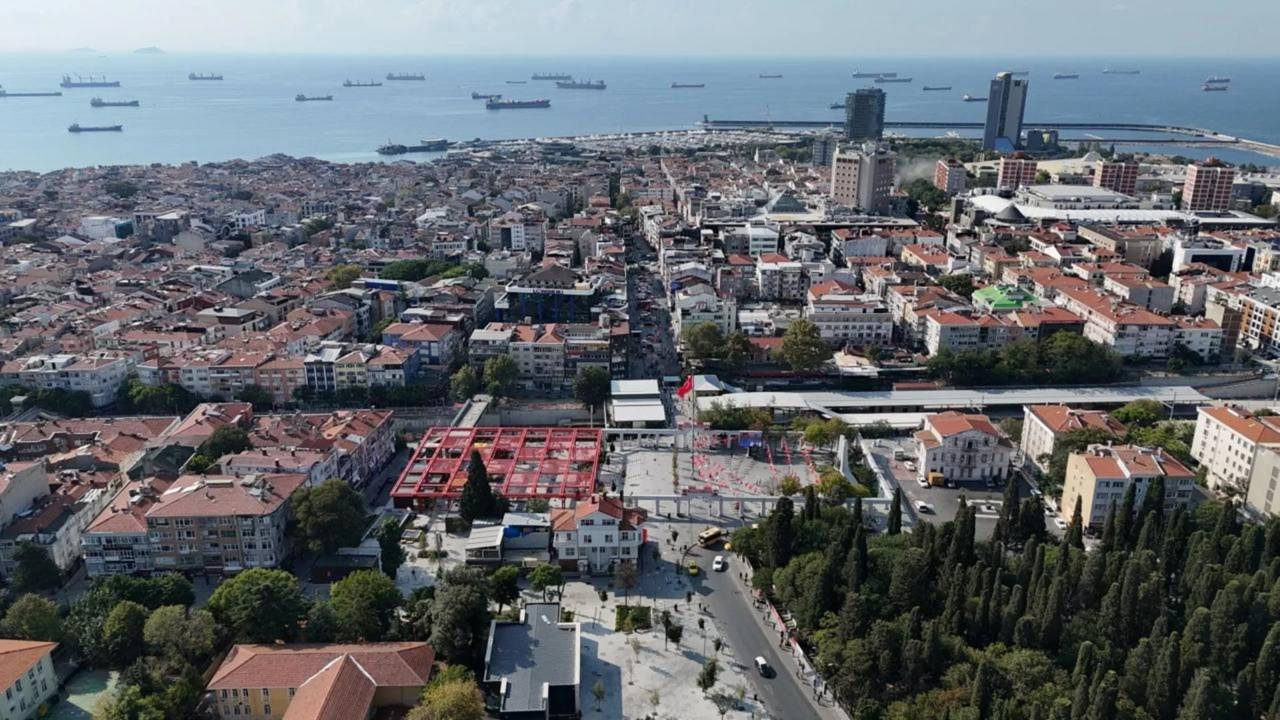
- Bakırköy district center (2025)

- Logo

- Map showing Bakırköy District in Istanbul Province

- Location within Turkey Location within Istanbul
- Coordinates: 40°58′59″N 28°51′13″E
- Country: Turkey
- Province: Istanbul

Government
  - Mayor: Ayşegül Ovalıoğlu (CHP)
- Area: 29 km^{2} (11 sq mi)
- Population (2022): 226,685
  - Density: 7,800/km^{2} (20,000/sq mi)
- Time zone: UTC+3 (TRT)
- Postal code: 34140
- Area code: 0212
- Website: www.bakirkoy.bel.tr

Bakırköy is a municipality and district in the European part of Istanbul Province, Turkey. Its area is 29 km^{2}, and its population is 226,685 (2022). Bakırköy lies between the D.100 highway (locally known as E-5) and the coast of the Sea of Marmara. Bakırköy houses a large psychiatric hospital, and is an important shopping and commercial center.

== Geography ==
Bakırköy, which was one of the largest districts of Istanbul with an area of 275 km² until 1989 and was bounded by Çatalca to the west, Eyüpsultan and Gaziosmanpaşa to the north, shrunk both in terms of population and area with the local elections of 1989 and 1992, first with the separation of Küçükçekmece and then Bahçelievler, Bağcılar and Güngören districts. Nowadays Bakırköy has a surface area of 29.22 km² with its new borders.

While the average elevation is 20-30 meters throughout Bakırköy, this value rises to 70 meters in the north of the district. The ridges slope north-south towards the Marmara Sea. The coastal length of Bakırköy is 13 km, with small cliffs in Yeşilköy and Yeşilyurt neighborhoods and a sandy beach in Florya.

According to a 2024 urban ecology study focusing on Bakırköy and Zeytinburnu, Bakırköy's green areas are 520 hectares, covering 17.39% of the overall area of the district. Since these green areas are not cemeteries but roads, streets and large parks or urban forests, Bakırköy presents a greener appearance compared to the Istanbul average. The study also identified six veteran trees (three mastic trees and three hackberry trees) in the residential neighborhoods of Bakırköy. In comparison, neighboring Zeytinburnu has 151 hectares of green space, mostly in cemeteries, which covers 13.02% of the district.

== History ==
In the Byzantine period Bakırköy was a separate community outside Constantinople, a well-watered pleasant seaside retreat from the city, and was called Hebdomon (Greek: Ἕβδομον, "the Seventh", i.e. seven Roman miles from the Milion, the mile-marker monument of Constantinople). Here - where nowadays the Ataköy Marina lies - the Emperor Valens built one of the two Imperial Palaces bearing the name of Magnaura, while Justinian erected another Palace named Jucundianae, also placed near the seaside. Two churches, dedicated respectively to St. John the Evangelist and to St. John Baptist the Forerunner, the latter hosting the head of the Saint and burial place of the Emperor Basil II, were also erected here. Hebdomon was a place of military exercise and concentration in what became known in Greek as the Kampos tou Tribounaliou (Greek: Κάμπος τοῦ τριβουναλίου) (in Latin Campus Tribunalis), where several Roman and Byzantine Emperors were elected through acclamation by the army. Among them were Valens, Arcadius, Honorius, Theodosius II, Phocas, and Nikephoros II Phokas. The Campus lay in the valley of Veli Efendi, where now the horse race course lies. The imperial court came often to the Hebdomon to attend military parades, to welcome the Emperor coming back from campaign, or to pray in the large church of St. John Baptist the Forerunner.

Later the place acquired the name of Makrohori (Greek: Μακροχώρι "Long Village"), which was adapted to Makriköy (Turkish: Köy "village") in the Ottoman period, when many large houses were built there. Yeşilköy (San Stefano), located within the present boundaries of the district, was occupied by the Russians in 1877-1878, and the Treaty of San Stefano was signed there on 3 March 1878. By the pre-First World War period it was known as a holiday resort for residents within Constantinople proper. During the WWI, the area suffered because of the British bombing of Istanbul.

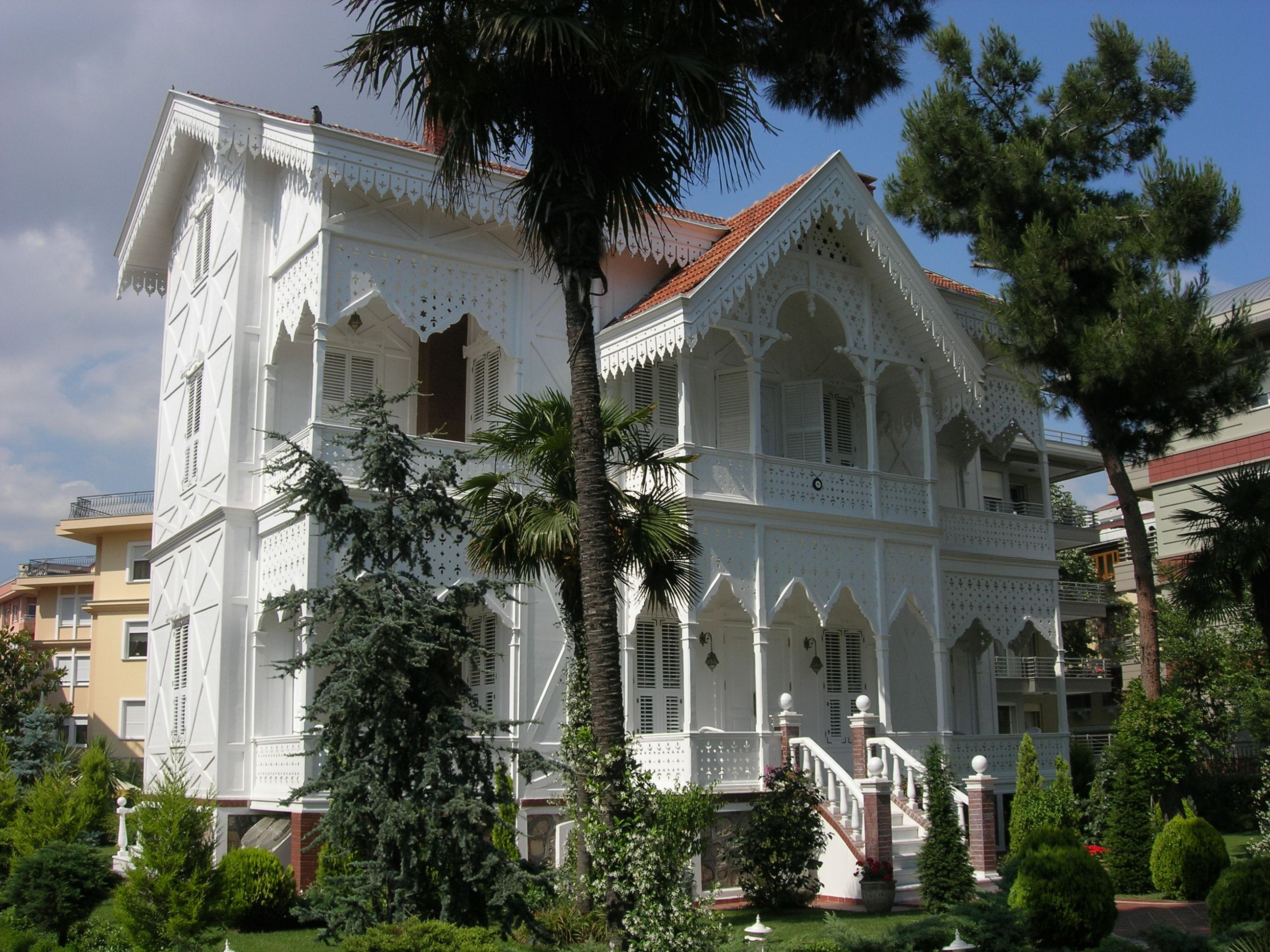
The Treaty of San Stefano was signed in the house of the Simenoğlu in Istanbul Caddesi, Yeşilköy

In 1925 the ancient denomination was changed to Bakırköy ("Copper Village") by a law suppressing place names of non-Turkish derivation. It was a district in Beyoğlu province between 1923 and 1926 and also at that time included the present Avcılar, Bağcılar, Bahçelievler, Başakşehir, Esenler, Güngören and Küçükçekmece districts, the western boroughs of Zeytinburnu and until 1957 a small part of the Arnavutköy district. It was the biggest district of Turkey before the separation of Küçükçekmece. There is little remaining of historical significance in the area: what there is includes a cistern (Fildamı Sarnıcı), a powder house from the 17th century (today used as Yunus Emre Kültür Merkezi in Ataköy), the Greek Orthodox church of Saint George (consecrated on May 2, 1832) and a Greek school, the central mosque and fountain of 1875, an Armenian Church and school and the resting place of the Muslim saint Zuhurat Baba, a Turkish soldier who died during the conquest of Constantinople. His resting place is often visited by women on Fridays. The seafront is now a popular location for tea gardens, clubs and restaurants, (although the beaches have been unusable for decades). After 1960, the population increased rapidly. As a result of this rapid growth, in the 1950s, rural settlements such as Güngören, Kocasinan and Sefaköy quickly turned into slums with title deeds. A similar development took place in Esenler, Yenibosna and Yeşilbağ around Halkalı in the 1970s. However, Küçükçekmece was the first settlement within the borders of Bakırköy district that showed rapid development and became a separate municipality in 1956. Bakırköy became a popular residential area in the late 19th century after the construction of a railroad connection to İstanbul and until the 1970s was one of the most relaxed and desirable locations in the city. It is still populated by Istanbul's upper middle-class (tradespeople, bureaucrats, the retired). Some parts of Bakırköy are very pleasant residential areas, particularly the streets from the hospital downwards to the sea. The planned satellite town of Ataköy to the west of Bakırköy centre is very tidy indeed, and was one of Turkey's first planned residential developments. Ataköy contains much social infrastructure including the Galleria shopping center and yacht marina.

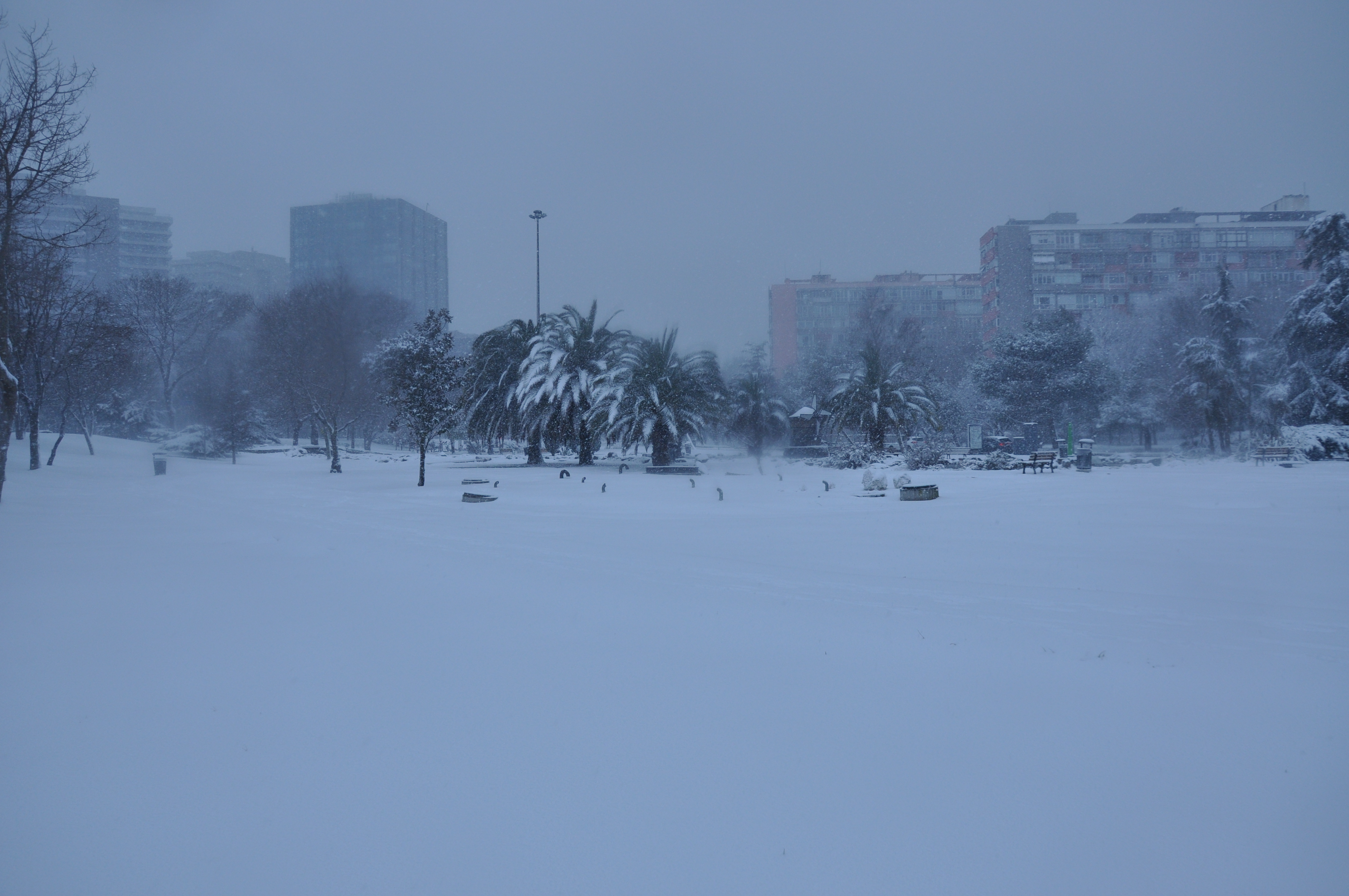
24th of January 2022 winter landscape in Bakırköy, İstanbul

== Composition ==
There are 15 neighbourhoods in Bakırköy District:

- Ataköy 1. Kısım
- Ataköy 2. 5. 6. Kısım
- Ataköy 3-4-11. Kısım
- Ataköy 7-8-9-10. Kısım
- Basınköy
- Cevizlik
- Kartaltepe
- Osmaniye
- Sakızağacı
- Şenlikköy
- Yenimahalle
- Yeşilköy
- Yeşilyurt
- Zeytinlik
- Zuhuratbaba

== Today ==
The centre of Bakırköy is an important commercial district. There is a huge shopping district (including a number of huge shiny shopping centres as Carousel), a range of cinemas, bars and cafés, as well as conversion of streets to pedestrian malls. Bakırköy is easy to reach by public transport; there are minibuses (Turkish:Dolmuş) to Beyoğlu throughout the night; there are buses to Mecidiyeköy (although using the D.100 highway by bus is unpleasant indeed: there is a ferry boat service that takes passengers to Kadıköy and Bostancı on the Asian side of the city and also to the Adalar (Islands); and the light-railway from the airport to Aksaray runs through here. Moreover, the quarter has a station of the suburban railway line between Sirkeci and Halkalı. Built in 1913, Veliefendi Race Course, Turkey's largest and oldest modern horse-racing track (not including the ancient hippodromes in Turkey), is in close proximity. Istanbul's largest mental hospital is in Bakırköy, and the parkland surrounding it is the largest green space in the district. There is a popular belief that the underground water of Bakırköy comes from the river Danube. Being near the Fault in the Sea of Marmara, Bakırköy is vulnerable to earthquake damage. There is a restriction on the amount of floors allowed in a building as a result.

== Economy ==
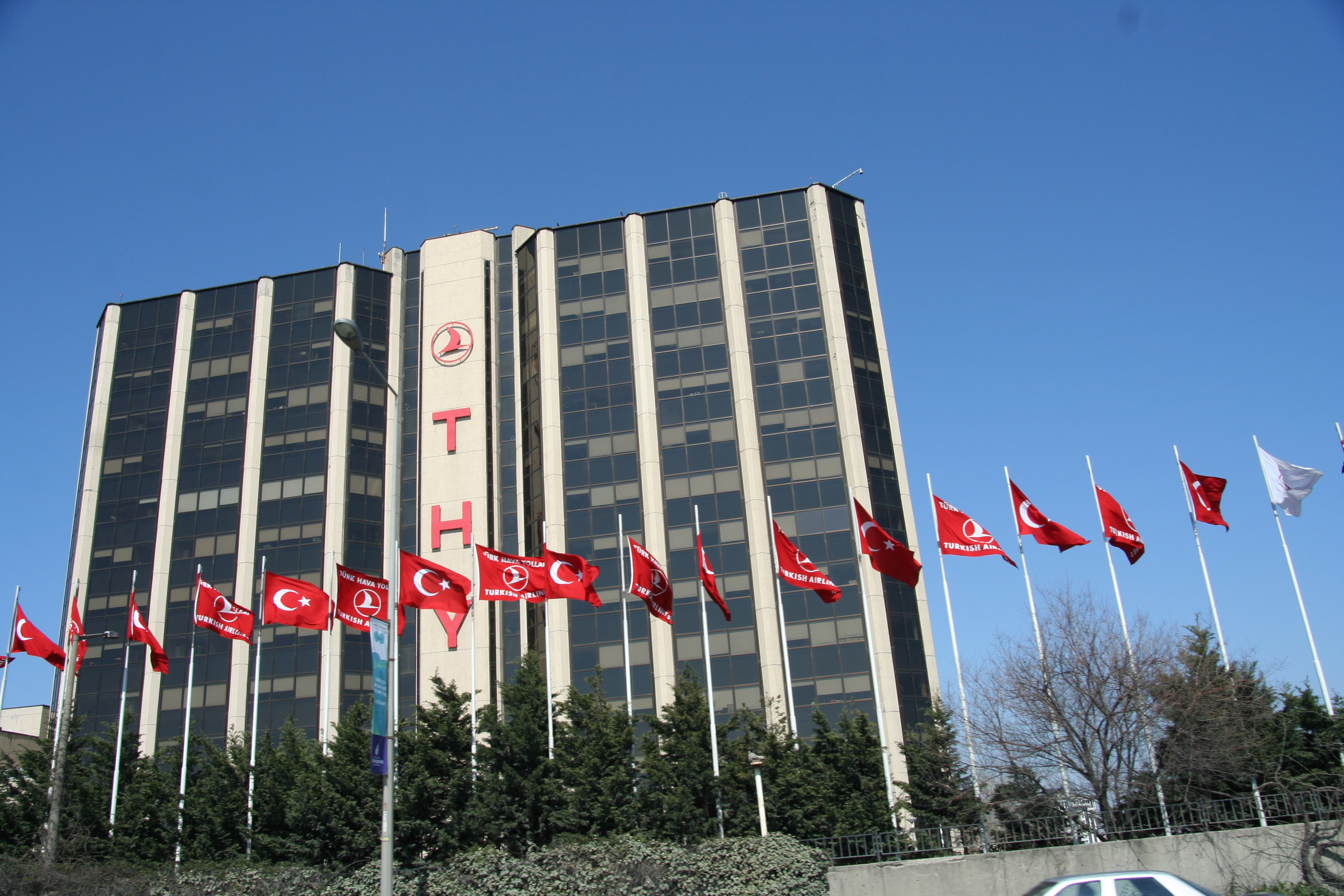
Turkish Airlines head office

The headquarters of Turkish Airlines are on the grounds of Istanbul Atatürk Airport in Yeşilköy in Bakırköy. Borajet also has its head office in Yeşilköy.

== Climate ==
Bakırköy experiences a Mediterranean climate (Csa/Cs) according to both Köppen and Trewartha climate classifications, with cool winters and warm to hot summers. Bakırköy is, by a margin, the warmest district in Istanbul, with an average temperature of almost 15 °C (59 °F), with an especially significant difference in summer. Bakırköy is also one of the only districts in Istanbul with a USDA hardiness zone rating of 9b and an AHS heat zone rating of 4.

Climate data for Florya, Bakırköy, Istanbul (normals 1991–2020, extremes 1937–present, sunshine 1981-2010)
Month	Jan	Feb	Mar	Apr	May	Jun	Jul	Aug	Sep	Oct	Nov	Dec	Year
Record high °C (°F)	20.5 (68.9)	21.0 (69.8)	26.0 (78.8)	30.5 (86.9)	33.5 (92.3)	36.2 (97.2)	37.4 (99.3)	38.6 (101.5)	39.5 (103.1)	32.3 (90.1)	26.4 (79.5)	23.1 (73.6)	39.5 (103.1)
Mean daily maximum °C (°F)	9.2 (48.6)	9.8 (49.6)	12.4 (54.3)	17.1 (62.8)	22.2 (72.0)	26.8 (80.2)	29.5 (85.1)	29.7 (85.5)	25.8 (78.4)	20.8 (69.4)	15.8 (60.4)	11.1 (52.0)	19.2 (66.5)
Daily mean °C (°F)	6.2 (43.2)	6.3 (43.3)	8.3 (46.9)	12.2 (54.0)	17.2 (63.0)	22.0 (71.6)	24.7 (76.5)	25.0 (77.0)	21.1 (70.0)	16.7 (62.1)	12.1 (53.8)	8.1 (46.6)	15.0 (59.0)
Mean daily minimum °C (°F)	3.7 (38.7)	3.6 (38.5)	5.3 (41.5)	8.6 (47.5)	13.4 (56.1)	17.8 (64.0)	20.5 (68.9)	21.1 (70.0)	17.4 (63.3)	13.6 (56.5)	9.3 (48.7)	5.7 (42.3)	11.7 (53.0)
Record low °C (°F)	−12.6 (9.3)	−10.0 (14.0)	−9.6 (14.7)	−1.4 (29.5)	1.4 (34.5)	8.4 (47.1)	11.0 (51.8)	11.4 (52.5)	6.7 (44.1)	1.8 (35.2)	−4.6 (23.7)	−11.5 (11.3)	−12.6 (9.3)
Average precipitation mm (inches)	72.0 (2.83)	78.8 (3.10)	61.0 (2.40)	51.5 (2.03)	30.2 (1.19)	31.5 (1.24)	19.8 (0.78)	26.1 (1.03)	44.7 (1.76)	80.4 (3.17)	69.3 (2.73)	87.3 (3.44)	648.0 (25.51)
Average extreme snow depth cm (inches)	7.0 (2.8)	7.5 (3.0)	1.1 (0.4)	0 (0)	0 (0)	0 (0)	0 (0)	0 (0)	0 (0)	0 (0)	trace	1.2 (0.5)	12.4 (4.9)
Average precipitation days (≥ 0.1 mm)	18.3	16.8	15.5	10.6	9.0	6.3	3.3	3.2	7.3	11.8	13.5	17.2	132.8
Average snowy days (≥ 0.1 cm)	2.7	3.5	0.6	0.0	0.0	0.0	0.0	0.0	0.0	0.0	0.2	1.0	8.0
Average relative humidity (%)	79.1	78.4	75.7	73.1	73.1	70.3	68.2	69.7	71.8	77.2	78.3	78.9	74.5
Mean monthly sunshine hours	89.3	103.4	154.8	198.2	279.0	286.2	310.7	284.2	201.7	152.1	112.0	83.3	2,254.9
Mean daily sunshine hours	2.8	3.6	4.9	6.6	9.0	9.5	10.0	9.1	6.7	4.9	3.7	2.6	6.1
Percentage possible sunshine	28	32	40	50	64	63	66	65	55	44	37	28	48

== Notable people ==
- Aras Özbiliz, Armenian football player
- Elpidophoros of America, Greek Orthodox bishop

== Places of interest ==
- Istanbul Atatürk Airport, Yeşilköy
- World Trade Center Istanbul, Yeşilköy
- Bakirkoy Synagogue, Bakırköy
- Carousel Shopping Center, Bakırköy
- Galleria Ataköy, Ataköy
- Beyti Restaurant, Florya

Nature

- Ayamama Life Valley, Ataköy
- Florya Atatürk Forest, Florya

Sport venues

- Ataköy Athletics Arena, Ataköy
- Sinan Erdem Dome, Ataköy
- Florya Metin Oktay Sports Complex and Training Center, Florya
- Şenlikköy Stadium, Florya

Culture

- Ataköy Gunpowder Mill
- Bakırköy Synagogue
- Fildamı Sarnıcı, Bakırköy
- Florya Atatürk Marine Mansion, Florya
- Istanbul Aviation Museum, Yeşilköy
- Yeşilköy Lighthouse, Yeşilköy

== Sport ==
The neighbourhood association football team is called Bakırköyspor, once one of top teams in the country, currently a local lower league outfit.

== Bakırköy municipality mayors ==
- 1984–1989 Naci Ekşi ANAP
- 1989–1991 Yıldırım Aktuna SHP
- 1991–1996 Ali Talip Özdemir ANAP
- 1996–2004 Ahmet Bahadırlı ANAP
- 2004–2014 Hilmi Ateş Ünal Erzen CHP
- 2014–2024 Bülent Kerimoğlu CHP
- 2024–present Ayşegül Ovalıoğlu CHP

== Sources ==
- Janin, Raymond (1964). Constantinople Byzantine (in French) (2 ed.). Paris: Institut Français d'Etudes Byzantines.
- Tuna, Turgay (2004). Ayastefanos'tan Yeşilköy'e (in Turkish).
