= Ataköy, Bakırköy =

Quarter of Istanbul, Turkey

Ataköy
- Quarter
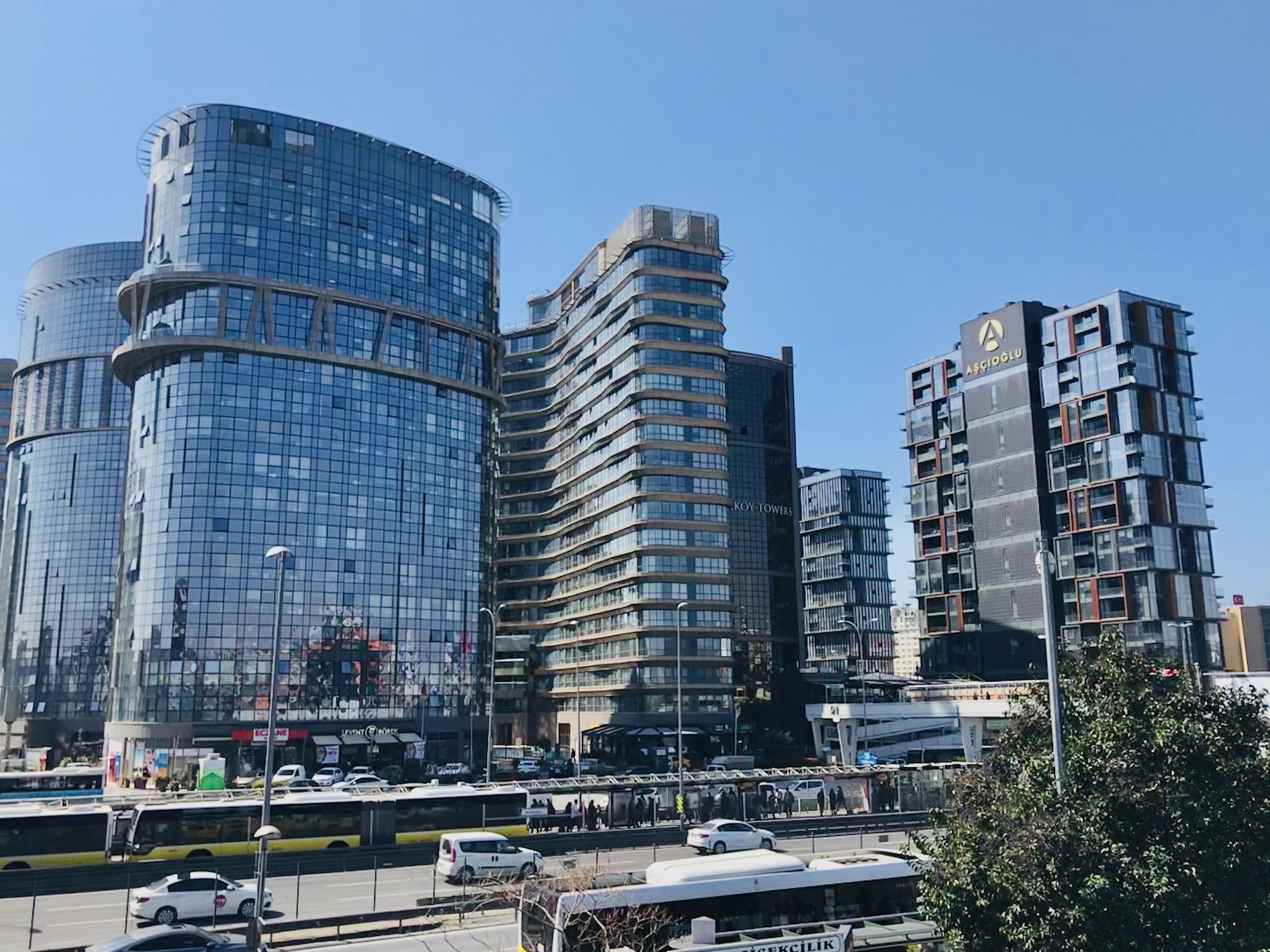
- A view of Nef Ataköy

- Location within Istanbul Location within Marmara Location within Turkey Location within Europe
- Coordinates: 40°58′59″N 28°51′13″E
- Country: Turkey
- Region: Marmara
- Province: Istanbul
- District: Bakırköy

Population (2022)
  - Total: 51,493
- Time zone: UTC+3 (TRT)
- Postal code: 34156 (7th-8th-9th-10th Section); 34158 (2nd-3rd-4th-5th-6th-11th Section)
- Area code: 0212

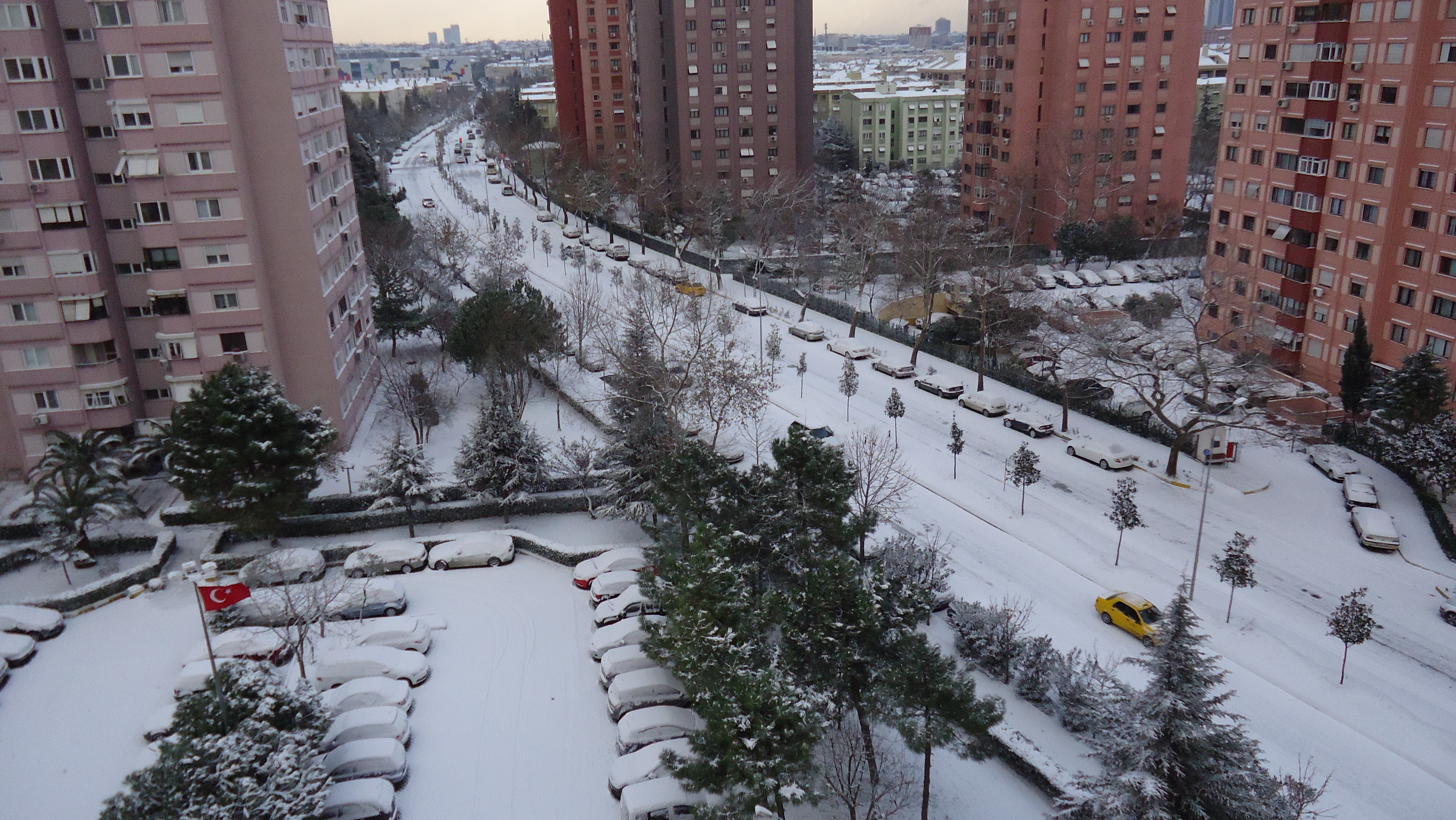
A view of Ataköy under snow.

Ataköy is a quarter of Bakırköy district in Istanbul Province, Turkey. It was developed as one of the first examples of satellite-city projects in Turkey.

Ataköy is located in Bakırköy district on the European side of Istanbul. It is adjacent to Bahçelievler district and Şirinevler neighborhood. The area in the then outskirt of Istanbul City, which Ataköy today covers, belonged to the Turkish military, and was called Baruthane (literally: gunpowder magazine). In the 1950s, the government of Prime Minister Adnan Menderes (in office (1950–1960)) transferred the property to the state-owned realty business bank Emlak Bank for envelopment as a satellite city of affordable housing for middle income households. In 1956, the project started with the construction of a beach site. The residence area was named "Ataköy" (literally "Atatürkville"). The project included 12,000 apartments, three hotels, beach, clubs, shopping malls, cultural center and sports facilities.

Ataköy quarter consists of four neighborhoods with eleven sections of apartment blocks. The quarter is a mostly residential area with wide green zones. The neighborhoods in the quarter are the Ataköy 1st Section, the 2nd-5th-6th Section, the 3rd-4th-11th Section and the 7th-8th-9th-10th Section. The 9th and 10th Sections were developed in 1986, and the 7th and 8th Sections were completed in 1990. In the recent years, some construction companies built residence blocks around the existing apartment blocks.

Following facilities are situated in Ataköy: Ataköy Gunpowder Mill, Yunus Emre Cultural Center, Conservatory of Bakırköy Municipality, Ataköy Marina, Atrium Shopping Mall, Galleria Ataköy and Ataköy A Plus Shopping Mall, Sinan Erdem Dome, Ataköy Athletics Arena.

== Population ==
As of 2022, the total population of the four neighborhoods in the quarter was 51,493, of which 53.9% women.

Population of Ataköy Quarter (2022)
Neighbourhood	Population
Ataköy 1st Section	1,715
Ataköy 2nd-5th-6th Section	14,396
Ataköy 3rd-4th-11th Section	8,130
Ataköy 7th-8th-9th-10th Section	27,252
Total	51,493

== Environment ==
Ataköy is a rather green quarter compared to other urban neighbourhoods and districts near it, and its lands had been planted since 1960's in scope of an urban planning. In Ottoman period, what is now Ataköy was property of a gunpowder mill that was founded in 1700. In addition, six veteran trees, three mastic trees and three hackberry trees, were identified and registered. Green areas in Ataköy are home to an urban ecosystem inhabited by various species of birds, mammals and insects.

Recently a large part of the coast of Ataköy has undergone a dense housing development that consists of many residences and hotels, so green areas of Ataköy was decreased. The dense housing was stopped by opinion of court due to infringement of coastal law.

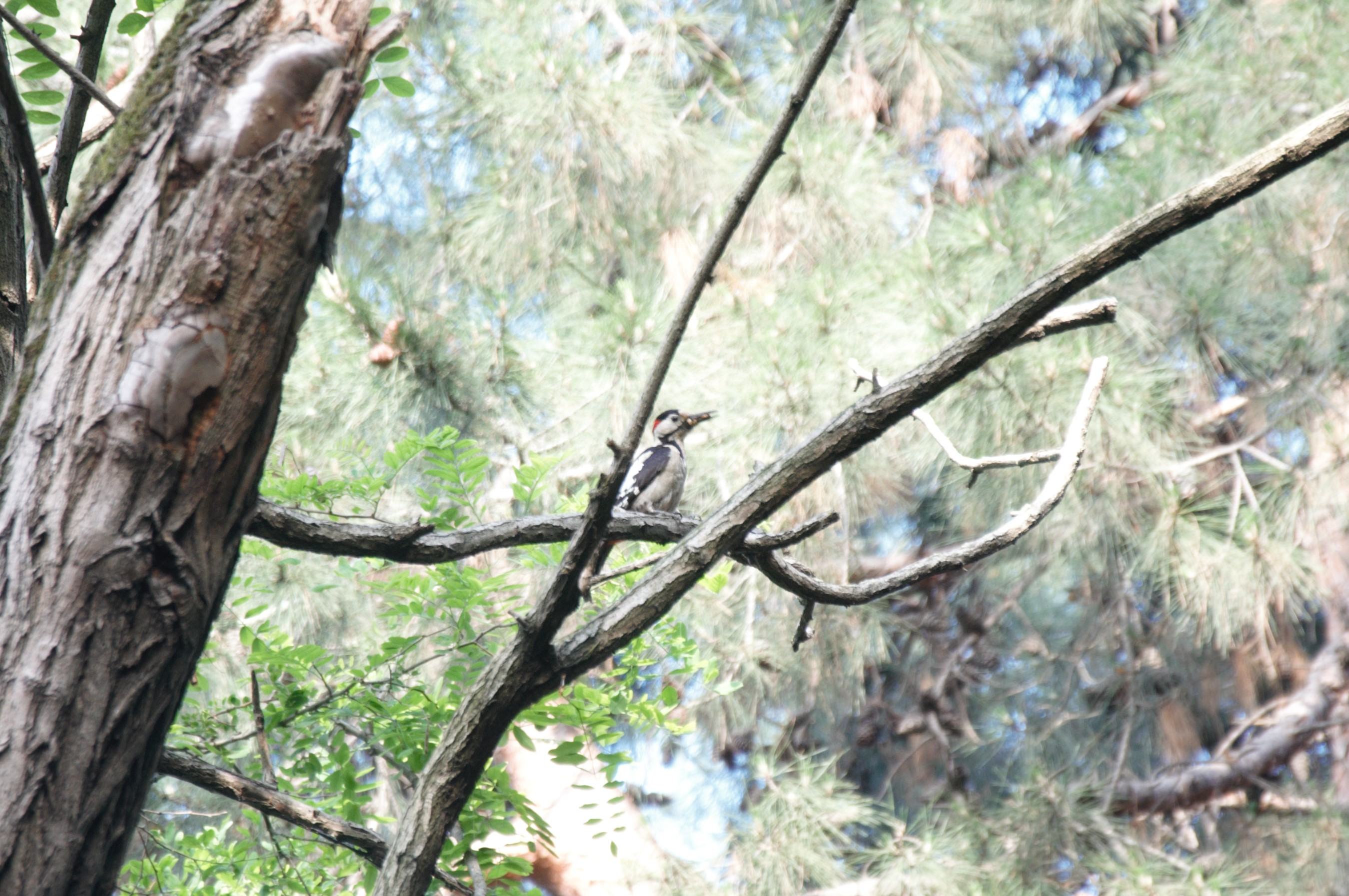
A syrian woodpecker on an acacia tree

== Transportation ==
Ataköy is served by the metro line M1A at Ataköy–Şirinevler station, by Marmaray and M9 line at the Ataköy station, and by Metrobus line at Şirinevler metrobus station. The city bus lines 71T-72T and 71AT connect the location with Taksim Square.
