= 2024–25 Galatasaray S.K. (women's football) season =

Galatasaray Petrol Ofisi
2024–25 season
- Chairman: Dursun Özbek
- Head coach: Metin Ülgen
- Stadium: Florya Metin Oktay Facilities (Super League); Atatürk Olympic Stadium (Champions League)
- Turkish Women's Football Super League: 4th
- UEFA Women's Champions League: Group stage
- Top goalscorer: League: Marie Ngah (14); All: Marie Ngah (14)
- All statistics correct as of 4 May 2025.

The 2024–25 season will be the 4th season in the existence of Galatasaray S.K. women's football team and the club's fourth consecutive season in the top flight of Turkish football.

== Season overview ==
=== Pre-season ===
On 5 July, Galatasaray's opponent in Group 8 of the UEFA Women's Champions League 1st Round was Racing FC Union Luxembourg.

On 27 August, The fixtures of the 2024–25 Season Turkcell Women's Football Super League have been announced.

=== September ===
On 9 September, Competing in the UEFA Women's Champions League for the first time in its history, Galatasaray will face Czech representative Slavia Prague in the 2nd round play-off stage.

== Kits ==
Galatasaray's 2024–25 kits, manufactured by Puma, were unveiled on 4 July 2024 and went on sale on the same day.

=== Sponsor ===
- Supplier: Puma
- Name sponsor: Petrol Ofisi
- Main sponsor: Petrol Ofisi
- Back sponsor: —
- Sleeve sponsor: SPOINT İnşaat
- Short sponsor: —
- Socks sponsor: —

=== Match ===
Home
Home alt.
Away
Away alt.
Third
Goalkeeper 1
Goalkeeper 2
Goalkeeper 3

== Squad information ==
As of 21 April 2025

No.	Player	Nat.	Position(s)	Signed in	Date of birth (Age)	Signed from
Goalkeepers
1	Gamze Nur Yaman	(Turkey)	GK	2022	25 April 1999 (age 27)	(Ukraine) WFC Zhytlobud-2 Kharkiv
17	Handan Kurğa	(Turkey)	GK	2022	10 September 1993 (age 32)	(Turkey) Konak Belediyespor
23	Müge İnan Kandur	(Turkey)	GK	2022	5 January 1994 (age 32)	(Turkey) Fatih Karagümrük
62	Esra Yarım	(Turkey)	GK	2024	4 January 2008 (age 18)	(Turkey) Eskişehir Büyükşehir Gençlik ve Spor Kulübü
Defenders
2	Jazmin Wardlow	(United States)	DF	2024	30 October 1997 (age 28)	(Australia) Central Coast Mariners
3	Ina Kristoffersen	(Norway)	DF	2025	16 December 1999 (age 26)	(Norway) Viking FK
4	Oluwatosin Demehin	(Nigeria)	DF	2024	13 March 2002 (age 24)	(France) Stade de Reims
5	Eda Karataş	(Turkey)	DF	2023	15 June 1995 (age 31)	(Turkey) ALG Spor
13	Fatma Sare Öztürk	(Turkey)	DF	2022	5 July 2000 (age 25)	(Turkey) Trabzonspor
20	Berna Yeniçeri	(Turkey)	DF	2022	26 January 1996 (age 30)	(Turkey) Beşiktaş
33	Çiğdem Belci	(Turkey)	DF	2025	17 June 1987 (age 39)	(Turkey) Beylerbeyi Spor Kulübü
Midfielders
6	Ayşe Demirci	(Turkey)	MF	2025	26 April 2001 (age 25)	(United States) Gardner–Webb University
7	Arzu Karabulut	(Turkey)	MF	2024	30 January 1991 (age 35)	(Turkey) ALG Spor
8	Emine Ecem Esen (captain)	(Turkey)	MF	2022	3 May 1994 (age 32)	(Turkey) ALG Spor
10	İsmigül Yalçıner	(Turkey)	MF	2021	20 October 1994 (age 31)	(Turkey) Kireçburnu Spor
15	Berra Pekgöz	(Turkey)	MF	2023	18 June 2007 (age 19)	(Turkey) Tunç Spor
18	Kristina Bakarandze	(Azerbaijan)	MF	2022	19 May 1998 (age 28)	(Turkey) ALG Spor
21	Ecem Cumert	(Turkey)	MF	2024	7 February 1998 (age 28)	(Turkey) Fenerbahçe Petrol Ofisi
22	Nazlıcan Parlak	(Turkey) (Azerbaijan)	MF	2023	27 May 1993 (age 33)	(Turkey) Fenerbahçe Petrol Ofisi
24	Arzu Akkurt	(Turkey)	MF	2021	1 July 2004 (age 21)	(Turkey) 1207 Antalya Spor
77	İrem Eren	(Turkey)	MF	2024	17 August 2000 (age 25)	(Turkey) Fatih Vatan Spor
Forwards
9	Elanur Laçın	(Turkey)	FW	2021	4 August 2004 (age 21)	(Turkey) Kireçburnu Spor
11	Catalina Usme	(Colombia)	FW	2024	25 December 1989 (age 36)	(Mexico) Pachuca
12	Andrea Stašková	(Czech Republic)	FW	2024	12 May 2000 (age 26)	(Italy) AC Milan
14	Laura Domínguez	(Spain)	FW	2025	12 August 1997 (age 28)	(Spain) Madrid CFF
16	Ebru Topçu	(Turkey)	FW	2022	27 August 1996 (age 29)	(Turkey) ALG Spor
19	Flourish Sabastine	(Nigeria)	FW	2024	20 October 2004 (age 21)	(France) Stade de Reims
25	Hapsatou Malado Diallo	(Senegal)	FW	2024	14 April 2005 (age 21)	(Spain) Eibar
30	Marie Ngah	(Cameroon)	FW	2024	20 October 2002 (age 23)	(Turkey) Hakkarigücü Spor
99	Benan Altıntaş	(Turkey)	FW	2023	10 November 2001 (age 24)	(Turkey) Fomget Gençlik ve Spor

== New contracts and transfers ==
=== Contract extensions ===
Date	No.	Pos.	Nat.	Player	Status	Contract length	Contract ends	Source
26 August 2024	1	GK	(Turkey)	Gamze Nur Yaman	Extended	One-year	30 June 2025	
26 August 2024	17	GK	(Turkey)	Handan Kurğa	Extended	One-year	30 June 2025	
26 August 2024	23	GK	(Turkey)	Müge İnan Kandur	Extended	One-year	30 June 2025	
26 August 2024	5	DF	(Turkey)	Eda Karataş	Extended	One-year	30 June 2025	
26 August 2024	13	DF	(Turkey)	Fatma Sare Öztürk	Extended	One-year	30 June 2025	
26 August 2024	20	DF	(Turkey)	Berna Yeniçeri	Extended	One-year	30 June 2025	
26 August 2024	7	MF	(Turkey)	Arzu Karabulut	Extended	One-year	30 June 2025	
26 August 2024	8	MF	(Turkey)	Emine Ecem Esen	Extended	One-year	30 June 2025	
26 August 2024	10	MF	(Turkey)	İsmigül Yalçıner	Extended	One-year	30 June 2025	
26 August 2024	22	MF	(Turkey)	Nazlıcan Parlak	Extended	One-year	30 June 2025	
26 August 2024	24	MF	(Turkey)	Arzu Akkurt	Extended	One-year	30 June 2025	
26 August 2024	15	MF	(Turkey)	Berra Pekgöz	Extended	One-year	30 June 2025	
26 August 2024	9	FW	(Turkey)	Elanur Laçın	Extended	One-year	30 June 2025	
26 August 2024	16	FW	(Turkey)	Ebru Topçu	Extended	One-year	30 June 2025	
26 August 2024	99	FW	(Turkey)	Benan Altıntaş	Extended	One-year	30 June 2025	
28 August 2024	18	MF	(Azerbaijan)	Kristina Bakarandze	Extended	One-year	30 June 2025	

=== Transfers in ===
Date	No.	Pos.	Player	Transferred from	Fee	Source
23 August 2024	12	FW	(Czech Republic) Andrea Stašková	(Italy) AC Milan	Undisclosed	
23 August 2024	2	DF	(United States) Jazmin Wardlow	(Australia) Central Coast Mariners	Undisclosed	
23 August 2024	21	MF	(Turkey) Ecem Cumert	(Turkey) Fenerbahçe Petrol Ofisi	Undisclosed	
23 August 2024	11	FW	(Colombia) Catalina Usme	(Mexico) Pachuca	Undisclosed	
23 August 2024	77	MF	(Turkey) İrem Eren	(Turkey) Fatih Vatan Spor	Undisclosed	
25 August 2024	25	FW	(Senegal) Hapsatou Malado Diallo	(Spain) Eibar	Undisclosed	
18 September 2024	4	DF	(Nigeria) Oluwatosin Demehin	(France) Stade de Reims	Undisclosed	
23 October 2024	62	GK	(Turkey) Esra Yarım	(Turkey) Eskişehir Büyükşehir Gençlik ve Spor Kulübü	Undisclosed	
3 November 2024	19	FW	(Nigeria) Flourish Sabastine	(France) Stade de Reims	Undisclosed	
9 November 2024	30	FW	(Cameroon) Marie Ngah	(Turkey) Hakkarigücü Spor	Undisclosed	
11 January 2025	14	FW	(Spain) Laura Domínguez	(Spain) Madrid CFF	Undisclosed	
6 February 2025	3	DF	(Norway) Ina Kristoffersen	(Norway) Viking FK	Undisclosed	
6 February 2025	6	MF	(Turkey) Ayşe Demirci	(United States) Gardner–Webb University	Undisclosed	
17 February 2025	33	DF	(Turkey) Çiğdem Belci	(Turkey) Beylerbeyi Spor Kulübü	Undisclosed	

=== Transfers out ===
Date	No.	Pos.	Player	Transferred to	Fee	Source
8 June 2024	25	DF	(Ukraine) Lyubov Shmatko	(Turkey) Fomget Gençlik ve Spor	End of contract	
17 July 2024	3	DF	(Turkey) Rabia Nur Küçük	(Turkey) Trabzonspor	End of contract	
17 July 2024	7	FW	(Tunisia) Mariem Houij	(Saudi Arabia) Abha Club	End of contract	
17 July 2024	11	FW	(Democratic Republic of the Congo) Monique Rith	(Saudi Arabia) Al Nassr	End of contract	
17 July 2024	15	MF	(Nigeria) Chinaza Uchendu	(France) Nantes	End of contract	
17 July 2024	19	MF	(Turkey) Zehra Yılmaz	(Turkey) Soma Zafer Spor	End of contract	
17 July 2024	77	FW	(Albania) Megi Doçi	(Albania) KFF Vllaznia	End of contract	
17 July 2024	88	FW	(Zambia) Siomala Mapepa		End of contract	
20 September 2024	–	MF	(Turkey) Helin Erbulun	(Turkey) Çekmeköy BilgiDoğa Spor	Undisclosed	

=== Transfer summary ===
"Undisclosed fees as well as additional bonuses which may be applicable and might affect the transfer income are not included in transfer amounts"

Expenditure

Summer: ▼€0,000,000

Winter: ▼€0,000,000

Total: ▼€0,000,000

Income

Summer: ▲€0,000,000

Winter: ▲€0,000,000

Total: ▲€0,000,000

Net totals

Summer: ▼€0,000,000

Winter: ▲€0,000,000

Total: ▲€0,000,000

== Management team ==
Position	Staff
Head Coach	(Turkey) Metin Ülgen
Assistant Sporting Director	(Turkey) Gülfem Kocaoğlu
Assistant Coach	(Turkey) Mustafa Engin Özmen
Analyst	(Turkey) Birkan İpek
Physiotherapist	(Turkey) Gülin Köseoğlu
Outfitter	(Turkey) Davut Kilvan
Youth Coach	(Turkey) Taner Taşdemir
Athletic Performance Coach	(Turkey) Durmuş Samet Kösemen

Last updated: 14 August 2024.
Source: Kadın Futbol Takımı İdari ve Teknik Kadro – GALATASARAY.ORG

== Pre-season and friendlies ==
Win Draw Loss Fixtures

=== Pre-season ===
25 August 2024 Friendly	Galatasaray Petrol Ofisi	1–0	Beşiktaş United Payment	Istanbul
16:00 TRT (UTC+3)	Akkurt 65'	Report		Stadium: Florya Metin Oktay Facilities

=== Mid-season ===
v

== Competitions ==
=== Overall record ===
Competition	First match	Last match	Starting round	Final position	Record							
Competition	First match	Last match	Starting round	Final position	Pld	W	D	L	GF	GA	GD	Win %
Super League	11 September 2024	4 May 2025	Matchday 1	4th	26	15	5	6	73	33	+40	57.69
Champions League	4 September 2024	17 December 2024	Round 1	Group stage	10	3	1	6	14	32	−18	30.00
Total					36	18	6	12	87	65	+22	50.00

Last updated: 4 May 2025
Source: FootyStats

=== Turkish Women's Football Super League ===
==== League table ====
Pos	Team	Pld	W	D	L	GF	GA	GD	Pts
2	Fenerbahçe	26	22	2	2	85	11	+74	68
3	Beşiktaş	26	17	2	7	48	27	+21	53
4	Galatasaray	26	15	5	6	73	33	+40	50
5	Trabzonspor	26	15	3	8	64	23	+41	48
6	Beylerbeyi	26	14	5	7	57	23	+34	47

Source: TFF.org

==== Results summary ====
Overall								Home						Away					
Pld	W	D	L	GF	GA	GD	Pts	W	D	L	GF	GA	GD	W	D	L	GF	GA	GD
26	15	5	6	73	33	+40	50	8	4	1	38	15	+23	7	1	5	35	18	+17

Last updated: 4 May 2025.
Source: Competitive matches

==== Results by matchday ====
Round	1	2	3	4	5	6	7	8	9	10	11	12	13	14	15	16	17	18	19	20	21	22	23	24	25	26
Ground	A	H	A	H	A	A	H	A	H	A	H	A	H	H	A	H	A	H	H	A	H	A	H	A	H	A
Result	W	W	D	W	W	L	W	L	W	W	W	L	L	W	W	D	W	W	D	W	W	W	D	L	W	L
Position	1	1	3	3	2	3	2	5	4	4	5	5	6	6	6	6	5	4	6	4	3	3	3	4	4	4

Updated to match(es) played on 4 May 2025. Source: Competitive matches
A = Away; H = Home; W = Win; D = Draw; L = Loss

==== Matches ====
11 September 2024 1	Çekmeköy BilgiDoğa Spor	0–11	Galatasaray Petrol Ofisi	Çekmeköy, Istanbul
16:00 TRT (UTC+3)		Report 1 Report 2	Usme 4', 47'; Topçu 13', 54', 61'; Akkurt (yellow card) 20' (goal) 44'; Diallo 32', 52'; Pekgöz 41' (pen.); Parlak 70', 74'	Stadium: Ömerli District Stadium; Referee: Büşra Aydoğdu; Assistant referees: Esra Arıkboğa, Selvi Güler; Fourth official: Abdullah Kaan Yer

19 January 2025 2	Galatasaray Petrol Ofisi	4–0	Ünye Kadın Spor Kulübü	Şenlikköy, Bakırköy, Istanbul
14:00 TRT (UTC+3)	Bakarandze 6'; Karabulut 8'; Topçu 90' (pen.); Usme 90+5'	Report 1 Report 2	Duman (yellow card) 45+2'; İriş (yellow card) 81'	Stadium: Florya Metin Oktay Facilities; Referee: Göktuğ Özen; Assistant referees: Caner Bür, Yağmur Makbule Erden; Fourth official: Resul Bostancı
Note: The match, originally scheduled for 15 September 2024, was postponed to a later date due to Galatasaray's UEFA Women's Champions League qualifying match.

29 January 2025 3	Trabzonspor	1–1	Galatasaray Petrol Ofisi	Trabzon
14:00 TRT (UTC+3)	Troka 55'	Report 1 Report 2	Stašková 70'	Stadium: Trabzonspor Kadir Özcan Tesisleri; Referee: Mustafa Alperen Şenol; Assistant referees: Hakan Koç, Sefa Adayın; Fourth official: Zelife Sağer
Note: The match, originally scheduled for 22 September 2024, was postponed to a later date due to Galatasaray's UEFA Women's Champions League qualifying match.

29 September 2024 4	Galatasaray Petrol Ofisi	2–1	Bornova Hitab Spor	Şenlikköy, Bakırköy, Istanbul
14:00 TRT (UTC+3)	Öztürk (yellow card) 43'; Kurğa (yellow card) 47'; Diallo 60'; Topçu 74'	Report 1 Report 2	Donzo 70'; Çınar (yellow card) 70'	Stadium: Florya Metin Oktay Facilities; Referee: Mertcan Tubay; Assistant referees: Mahmut Can Çilkız, Nuri Miski; Fourth official: Sarp Özdemir Baştuğ

6 October 2024 5	Kdz. Ereğli Belediye Spor	0–3 (w/o)	Galatasaray Petrol Ofisi
		Report
Note: Due to the expulsion of Kdz. Ereğli Belediye Spor from the league, Galatasaray Petrol Ofisi passed the week without playing a match and therefore won 3-0.

13 October 2024 6	Fenerbahçe Petrol Ofisi	2–0	Galatasaray Petrol Ofisi	Istanbul
14:00 TRT (UTC+3)	Özev 61'; Uraz 66'; Borgella (yellow card) 90+3'	Report 1 Report 2	Cumert (yellow card) 69'; Topçu (yellow card) 85'	Stadium: Dereağzı Lefter Küçükandonyadis Tesisleri; Referee: Tolga Akbaba; Assistant referees: Önder Osman Zengin, Nuri Miski; Fourth official: Alican Sağlar

3 November 2024 7	Galatasaray Petrol Ofisi	4–1	Amed Sportif Faaliyetler	Şenlikköy, Bakırköy, Istanbul
14:00 TRT (UTC+3)	Stašková 6', 37', 90+3'; Diallo 13'	Report 1 Report 2	Nana 52'; Çakır (yellow card) 56'	Stadium: Florya Metin Oktay Facilities; Referee: Hikmet Ayberk Han Tiryaki; Assistant referees: Kenan Konca, Emirhan Karayel; Fourth official: Gamze Yalçın

9 November 2024 8	Beşiktaş United Payment	1–0	Galatasaray Petrol Ofisi	Beşiktaş, Istanbul
16:00 TRT (UTC+3)	Halilaj 47'; Pereira (yellow card) 83'	Report 1 Report 2	Bakarandze (yellow card) 77'	Stadium: Beşiktaş Stadium; Referee: Sercan Yılmaz; Assistant referees: Önder Osman Zengin, Mahmut Can Çilkız; Fourth official: Büşra Aydoğdu

16 November 2024 9	Galatasaray Petrol Ofisi	3–2	Fatih Vatan Spor	Şenlikköy, Bakırköy, Istanbul
14:00 TRT (UTC+3)	Topçu 72'; Usme 82'; Ngah 87' (pen.)	Report 1 Report 2	Yakut (yellow card) 7'; Kaya 15'; Öztürk (yellow card) 26'; Semercioğlu (red card) 85'; Koçer 89'	Stadium: Florya Metin Oktay Facilities; Referee: Abdullah Murat Yoldaş; Assistant referees: Yunus Öncebe, Ceren Hanife Bahadır; Fourth official: Şüheda Başar

23 November 2024 10	Hakkarigücü Spor	1–2	Galatasaray Petrol Ofisi	Hakkâri
12:00 TRT (UTC+3)	Alçu (yellow card) 39'; Yaman 42' (o.g.); Sawadogo (yellow card) 60'; Yazıcı (yellow card) (yellow-red card) 78'; Nasaka (yellow card) 85'; Yaşar (red card) End of the match'	Report 1 Report 2	Ngah 13' (pen.); Demehin (yellow card) 40'; Sabastine (yellow card) 43'; Karataş (red card) 67'; Diallo 90+6'	Stadium: Merzan Şehir Stadı; Referee: Yunus Gül; Assistant referees: Elif Yılmaz, Ayşe Polat; Fourth official: Azad Savunmak

7 December 2024 11	Galatasaray Petrol Ofisi	2–2	Beylerbeyi Spor Kulübü	Şenlikköy, Bakırköy, Istanbul
14:00 TRT (UTC+3)	Esen (yellow card) 32'; Ngah 43' (pen.); Karabulut (yellow card) 51'; Demehin (yellow card) 57'; Diallo 78'; Akkurt (yellow card) 84'	Report 1 Report 2	Santos 12', (yellow card) (yellow-red card) 80'; Kong (yellow card) 20'; Queiroga (yellow card) 47'; Cordner 59'; Coleman (red card) 90+5'	Stadium: Florya Metin Oktay Facilities; Referee: Okan Kayataş; Assistant referees: Arzu Görgün, Ömer Faruk Şahin; Fourth official: Gizem Arık

14 December 2024 12	ALG Spor	2–1	Galatasaray Petrol Ofisi	Gaziantep
14:00 TRT (UTC+3)	Karličić 35' (yellow card) 61'; Jenkins 69'; Zarković (yellow card) 86'; Bozyel (yellow card) 87'	Report 1 Report 2	Öztürk (yellow card) 31'; Topçu 50'; Demehin (yellow card) 87'	Stadium: Batur Stadium; Referee: Serkan Gürbüz; Assistant referees: Mehmet Saldıraner, Mehmet Zekat Yılmaz; Fourth official: Hacı Hanifi Evgi

22 December 2024 13	Galatasaray Petrol Ofisi	1–5	Fomget Gençlik ve Spor	Şenlikköy, Bakırköy, Istanbul
14:00 TRT (UTC+3)	Sudré 14' (o.g.); Bakarandze (yellow card) 33'; Sabastine (yellow card) 45+7'; Topçu (yellow card) 76'	Report 1 Report 2	Ovdiychuk 42'; Alves 58'; Kuč 62'; İçinözbebek (yellow card) 67'; Kim 74', 87'	Stadium: Florya Metin Oktay Facilities; Referee: Ahmet Mert Sarı; Assistant referees: Kenan Gürsel, Neslihan Koç; Fourth official: Muhammed Emin Gül

26 January 2025 14	Galatasaray Petrol Ofisi	9–0	Çekmeköy BilgiDoğa Spor	Şenlikköy, Bakırköy, Istanbul
14:00 TRT (UTC+3)	Bakarandze 38'; Topçu 44'; Ngah 49', 77', 80'; Eren 68'; Karataş 79'; Karataş 75'; Parlak 75'; Usme 90'	Report 1 Report 2		Stadium: Florya Metin Oktay Facilities; Referee: Elif Köroğlu; Assistant referees: Erdem Sırmacı, Sezer Arıcı; Fourth official: Mehmet Yıldız

2 February 2025 15	Ünye Kadın Spor Kulübü	1–8	Galatasaray Petrol Ofisi	Ünye, Ordu
12:00 TRT (UTC+3)	Zeytünlü 11' (pen.); Duman (yellow card) 27'	Report 1 Report 2	Usme 2'; Demehin (yellow card) 45'; Diallo 47'; Ngah 49', 80', 84', 90'; Esen 66'; Karabulut 86'	Stadium: Ünye İlçe Stadium; Referee: Salih Çetin; Assistant referees: Tayfun Aras, Ersin Öztürk; Fourth official: Ahmet Emeksiz

9 February 2025 16	Galatasaray Petrol Ofisi	1–1	Trabzonspor	Şenlikköy, Bakırköy, Istanbul
14:00 TRT (UTC+3)	Sabastine 3'; Esen (yellow card) 83'; Bakarandze (red card) 89'	Report 1 Report 2	Polat (yellow card) 47'; Ramaj 55'	Stadium: Florya Metin Oktay Facilities; Referee: Giray Şaylan; Assistant referees: Mert Altan Çakır, Atakan Yüzlü; Fourth official: Onur Aydoğan

15 February 2025 17	Bornova Hitab Spor	2–3	Galatasaray Petrol Ofisi	Bornova, İzmir
13:00 TRT (UTC+3)	Altınkaya 24'; Aguadze 52'	Report 1 Report 2	Ngah 14', 83'; Demehin (yellow card) 25'; Diallo 48'	Stadium: Bornova İlçe Stadı; Referee: Aykut Çok; Assistant referees: Can Yapanmış, Onur Kaçak; Fourth official: Hakan Yüncü

2 March 2025 18	Galatasaray Petrol Ofisi	3–0 (w/o)	Kdz. Ereğli Belediye Spor
		Report

9 March 2025 19	Galatasaray Petrol Ofisi	1–1	Fenerbahçe Petrol Ofisi	Şenlikköy, Bakırköy, Istanbul
14:00 TRT (UTC+3)	Usme 72'; Karataş (yellow card) 90+4'; Cumert (yellow card) 90+6'	Report 1 Report 2	Cox 63'; Kaya (yellow card) 71'	Stadium: Florya Metin Oktay Facilities; Referee: Sercan Yılmaz; Assistant referees: Erol Ernek, Ertuğrul Konak; Fourth official: Remzi Mert Coşkun

16 March 2025 20	Amed Sportif Faaliyetler	0–1	Galatasaray Petrol Ofisi	Diyarbakır
14:00 TRT (UTC+3)	Sayaca (yellow card) 46'; Ewodo (yellow card) 48'	Report 1 Report 2	Topçu 53'	Stadium: Seyrantepe 1 Nolu Çim Saha; Referee: Umut Nasrullah Özhelvacı; Assistant referees: Emre Şahinalp, Erhan Terece; Fourth official: Cengiz Yıldırım

22 March 2025 21	Galatasaray Petrol Ofisi	3–0	Beşiktaş United Payment	Şenlikköy, Bakırköy, Istanbul
14:00 TRT (UTC+3)	Topçu 41' (pen.), 65', (yellow card) 90+2'; Diallo 90+4'	Report 1 Report 2		Stadium: Florya Metin Oktay Facilities; Referee: Yakup Özhan; Assistant referees: Batuhan Bıyıklı, Esra Arıkboğa; Fourth official: Oğuzhan Talha Karakuş

27 March 2025 22	Fatih Vatan Spor	1–2	Galatasaray Petrol Ofisi	Fatih, Istanbul
15:00 TRT (UTC+3)	Açar (yellow card) 43'; Posada 70'; Ataş (yellow card) 82'; Santos (yellow card) 89'	Report 1 Report 2	Usme (yellow card) 21'; Ngah 24'; Stašková 43'; Demehin (yellow card) 75'	Stadium: Balat Suni Çim Saha; Referee: Esad Sadık Demirtaş; Assistant referees: Semra Bulut, Ramazan Çiftçi; Fourth official: Berkay Bulut

13 April 2025 23	Galatasaray Petrol Ofisi	2–2	Hakkarigücü Spor	Şenlikköy, Bakırköy, Istanbul
14:00 TRT (UTC+3)	Kristoffersen 10'; Topçu 45'	Report 1 Report 2	Owusuaa 27' (pen.), 35'	Stadium: Florya Metin Oktay Facilities; Referee: Mülazım Argız; Assistant referees: Mertcan Tezcan, Damla Su Kasaroğlu; Fourth official: Gizem Arık

20 April 2025 24	Beylerbeyi Spor Kulübü	3–1	Galatasaray Petrol Ofisi	Istanbul
14:00 TRT (UTC+3)	Hançar 24' (pen.), 90+8'; Takounda 34'	Report 1 Report 2	Ngah 7'; Yaman (yellow card) 24'	Stadium: Beylerbeyi 75. Yıl Stadium; Referee: Berkay Şenyel; Assistant referees: Zeynep Çetin, Ayşegül Çetinkaya; Fourth official: Burcu Özdemir

27 April 2025 25	Galatasaray Petrol Ofisi	3–0	ALG Spor	Şenlikköy, Bakırköy, Istanbul
14:00 TRT (UTC+3)	Usme 53'; Karabulut 63', 67'; Akkurt (yellow card) 77'	Report 1 Report 2	İsgi (yellow card) 14'; Đukić (yellow card) 47'	Stadium: Florya Metin Oktay Facilities; Referee: Uğurcan Şanlı; Assistant referees: Hayri Atahan Olgun, Akın Aksu; Fourth official: Tolga Atasever

4 May 2025 26	Fomget Gençlik ve Spor	4–2	Galatasaray Petrol Ofisi	Sincan, Ankara
14:00 TRT (UTC+3)	Abideen 33'; Altuve 37'; Kim 39'; Mijatović 57'	Report 1 Report 2	Karabulut 43'; Demehin 52', (yellow card) 63'; Topçu (yellow card) 45+4'	Stadium: Osmanlı Stadium; Referee: Hasan Kaçar; Assistant referees: Harun Günaydın, Berat Binbir; Fourth official: Furkan Nizamoğlu

=== UEFA Women's Champions League ===
==== Qualifying round ====
===== Round 1 =====
4 September 2024 Semi final	Racing Union (Luxembourg)	1–4	(Turkey) Galatasaray	Luxembourg City, Luxembourg
20:00 TRT (UTC+3)	Fernandes (yellow card) 13'; Kocan (yellow card) 43'; Quatrana 61'; Wojdyla (yellow card) 64'; Dos Ramos (yellow card) 68'	Report 1 Report 2 Report 3	Altıntaş (yellow card) 13'; Topçu 16' (pen.); Karataş (yellow card) 21'; Stašková 32'; Karabulut 45+5'; Diallo (penalty missed) 80; Esen (yellow card) 89'; Usme 90+1'	Stadium: Stade Achille Hammerel; Attendance: 750; Referee: Anastasia Mylopoulou (Greece); Assistant referees: Zoi Papadopoulou (Greece), Julia Bukarowicz (Greece); Fourth official: Katarzyna Lisiecka-Sęk (Poland)

7 September 2024 Final	BIIK Shymkent (Kazakhstan)	0–5	(Turkey) Galatasaray	Luxembourg City, Luxembourg
20:00 TRT (UTC+3)	Gabelia (yellow card) 10'	Report 1 Report 2 Report 3	Diallo 8', 66', 90+4'; Stašková 20'; Wardlow (yellow card) 51'; Usme 70'; Yaman (yellow card) 82'	Stadium: Stade Achille Hammerel; Attendance: 250; Referee: Marina Živković (Serbia); Assistant referees: Andrea Milošević (Serbia), Isabel Chaplin (England); Fourth official: Stacey Pearson (England)

===== Round 2 =====
19 September 2024 First leg	Galatasaray (Turkey)	2–2	(Czech Republic) Slavia Prague	Esenyurt, Istanbul, Turkey
20:00 TRT (UTC+3)	Demehin (yellow card) 46'; Stašková 56', 66'; Altıntaş (yellow card) 80'; Wardlow (yellow card) 90+3'; Esen (yellow card) 90+7'	Report 1 Report 2 Report 3	Bendová (yellow card) 19'; Bartovičová (yellow card) 36'; Svitková (yellow card) 42'; Szewieczková 76'; Košíková 90+7'	Stadium: Esenyurt Necmi Kadıoğlu Stadium; Attendance: 1,412; Referee: Ana Maria Terteleac (Romania); Assistant referees: Mihaela Tepusa (Romania), Roxana Ivanov (Romania); Fourth official: Roxana Recorean (Romania)

25 September 2024 Second leg	Slavia Prague (Czech Republic)	1–2 (a.e.t.) (3–4 agg.)	(Turkey) Galatasaray	Prague, Czech Republic
19:00 TRT (UTC+3)	Karataş 31' (o.g.); Krejčiříková (yellow card) 63'; Annest (yellow card) 66'; Bendová (yellow card) 74'; Bartovičová (yellow card) 86'; Veselá (yellow card) 105+1'	Report 1 Report 2 Report 3	Karabulut 50' (yellow card) 90'; Parlak 100'; Kurğa (yellow card) 111'; Yeniçeri (yellow card) 120+4'	Stadium: Fortuna Arena; Attendance: 4,113; Referee: Hristiyana Guteva (Bulgaria); Assistant referees: Anita Vad (Bulgaria), Pavleta Rashkova (Bulgaria); Fourth official: Kristina Georgieva (Bulgaria)

==== Group stage ====
Pos	Team	Pld	W	D	L	GF	GA	GD	Pts	Qualification	LYO	WOL	ROM	GAL
1	(France) Lyon	6	6	0	0	19	1	+18	18	Advance to quarter-finals	—	1–0	4–1	3–0
2	(Germany) VfL Wolfsburg	6	3	0	3	16	5	+11	9 (Note: Wolfsburg 3 Pts, +4 GD; Roma 3 Pts, −4 GD.)	Advance to quarter-finals	0–2	—	6–1	5–0
3	(Italy) Roma	6	3	0	3	12	14	−2	9		0–3	1–0	—	3–0
4	(Turkey) Galatasaray	6	0	0	6	1	28	−27	0		0–6	0–5	1–6	—

Source: UEFA
Rules for classification: Group stage tiebreakers

===== Results =====
8 October 2024 1	Lyon (France)	3–0	(Turkey) Galatasaray	Décines-Charpieu, France
19:45 TRT (UTC+3)	Diani 34', 77'; Gilles 45'	Report 1 Report 2 Report 3		Stadium: Parc Olympique Lyonnais; Attendance: 3,650; Referee: Michalina Diakow (Poland); Assistant referees: Amina Gutschi (Austria), Staša Špur (Slovenia); Fourth official: Aleksandra Česen (Slovenia)

17 October 2024 2	Galatasaray (Turkey)	1–6	(Italy) Roma	Istanbul, Turkey
19:45 TRT (UTC+3)	Stašková 76'	Report 1 Report 2 Report 3	Cissoko 7' (yellow card) 81'; Giacinti 24'; Giugliano (penalty missed) 45+1 59'; Haavi 54'; Pandini 84'; Corelli 87'	Stadium: Atatürk Olympic Stadium; Attendance: 2,697; Referee: Tess Olofsson (Sweden); Assistant referees: Almira Spahić (Sweden), Monica Lokkeberg (Norway); Fourth official: Lovisa Johansson (Sweden)

13 November 2024 3	Galatasaray (Turkey)	0–5	(Germany) VfL Wolfsburg	Istanbul, Turkey
20:45 TRT (UTC+3)	Usme (yellow card) 10'; Cumert (yellow card) 33'; Stašková (yellow card) 58'	Report 1 Report 2 Report 3	Wedemeyer 24'; Blomqvist 63', 77', 90+6'; Endemann 90+7'	Stadium: Atatürk Olympic Stadium; Attendance: 2,081; Referee: Olatz Rivera Olmedo (Spain); Assistant referees: Iragartze Fernández Esesúmaga (Spain), Rocio Puente Pino (Spain); Fourth official: Ainara Acevedo (Spain)

20 November 2024 4	VfL Wolfsburg (Germany)	5–0	(Turkey) Galatasaray	Wolfsburg, Germany
20:45 TRT (UTC+3)	Popp 3', 15', 88'; Minge 31'; Lattwein 90+6'	Report 1 Report 2 Report 3	Bakarandze (yellow card) 74'	Stadium: AOK Stadion; Attendance: 2,536; Referee: Ivana Projkovska (North Macedonia); Assistant referees: Svitlana Grushko (Ukraine), Staša Špur (Slovenia); Fourth official: Aleksandra Česen (Slovenia)

11 December 2024 5	Galatasaray (Turkey)	0–6	(France) Lyon	Istanbul, Turkey
20:45 TRT (UTC+3)	Demehin (yellow card) 85'	Report 1 Report 2 Report 3	Hegerberg 19'; Däbritz 24'; Jackmon 34' (o.g.); Renard 49'; Van de Donk 69'; Le Sommer 76'	Stadium: Atatürk Olympic Stadium; Attendance: 550; Referee: Catarina Campos (Portugal); Assistant referees: Vanessa Gomes (Portugal), Sandrine Gonçalves Santos (Portugal); Fourth official: Silvia Domingos (Portugal)

17 December 2024 6	Roma (Italy)	3–0	(Turkey) Galatasaray	Rome, Italy
23:00 TRT (UTC+3)	Corelli 9', (yellow card) 58'; Ventriglia 82'; Linari 90+3'	Report 1 Report 2 Report 3		Stadium: Stadio Tre Fontane; Attendance: 1,142; Referee: Shona Shukrula (Netherlands); Assistant referees: Linda Schmid (Switzerland), Ceri Louise Williams (Wales); Fourth official: Désirée Grundbacher (Switzerland)

== Statistics ==
=== Appearances and goals ===
No.	Pos	Nat	Player	Total		Super League		Champions League	
No.	Pos	Nat	Player	Apps	Goals	Apps	Goals	Apps	Goals
Goalkeepers
1	GK	(Turkey) TUR	Gamze Nur Yaman	30	0	20	0	10	0
17	GK	(Turkey) TUR	Handan Kurğa	4	0	4	0	0	0
23	GK	(Turkey) TUR	Müge İnan Kandur	1	0	0	0	1	0
62	GK	(Turkey) TUR	Esra Yarım	0	0	0	0	0	0
Defenders
2	DF	(United States) USA	Jazmin Wardlow	12	0	6	0	6	0
3	DF	(Norway) NOR	Ina Kristoffersen	5	1	5	1	0	0
4	DF	(Nigeria) NGA	Oluwatosin Demehin	26	1	19	1	7	0
5	DF	(Turkey) TUR	Eda Karataş	32	1	22	1	10	0
13	DF	(Turkey) TUR	Fatma Sare Öztürk	12	0	9	0	3	0
20	DF	(Turkey) TUR	Berna Yeniçeri	20	0	14	0	6	0
33	DF	(Turkey) TUR	Çiğdem Belci	0	0	0	0	0	0
Midfielders
6	MF	(Turkey) TUR	Ayşe Demirci	0	0	0	0	0	0
7	MF	(Turkey) TUR	Arzu Karabulut	33	7	23	5	10	2
8	MF	(Turkey) TUR	Emine Ecem Esen	22	1	14	1	8	0
10	MF	(Turkey) TUR	İsmigül Yalçıner	3	0	1	0	2	0
15	MF	(Turkey) TUR	Berra Pekgöz	1	1	1	1	0	0
18	MF	(Azerbaijan) AZE	Kristina Bakarandze	25	2	15	2	10	0
21	MF	(Turkey) TUR	Ecem Cumert	26	0	19	0	7	0
22	MF	(Turkey) TUR	Nazlıcan Parlak	22	4	16	3	6	1
24	MF	(Turkey) TUR	Arzu Akkurt	20	1	12	1	8	0
77	MF	(Turkey) TUR	İrem Eren	6	1	2	1	4	0
Forwards
9	FW	(Turkey) TUR	Elanur Laçın	7	0	7	0	0	0
11	FW	(Colombia) COL	Catalina Usme	33	10	23	8	10	2
12	FW	(Czech Republic) CZE	Andrea Stašková	28	10	18	5	10	5
14	FW	(Spain) ESP	Laura Domínguez	12	0	12	0	0	0
16	FW	(Turkey) TUR	Ebru Topçu	32	13	24	12	8	1
19	FW	(Nigeria) NGA	Flourish Sabastine	18	1	18	1	0	0
25	FW	(Senegal) SEN	Hapsatou Malado Diallo	33	12	23	9	10	3
30	FW	(Cameroon) CMR	Marie Ngah	17	14	17	14	0	0
99	FW	(Turkey) TUR	Benan Altıntaş	8	0	4	0	4	0

Last updated: 4 May 2025.
Source: TFF.org, UEFA.com

=== Goalscorers ===
Rank	No.	Pos	Nat	Name	Super League	Champions League	Total
1	30	FW	(Cameroon)	Marie Ngah	14	0	14
2	16	FW	(Turkey)	Ebru Topçu	12	1	13
3	25	FW	(Senegal)	Hapsatou Malado Diallo	9	3	12
4	11	FW	(Colombia)	Catalina Usme	8	2	10
4	12	FW	(Czech Republic)	Andrea Stašková	5	5	10
5	7	MF	(Turkey)	Arzu Karabulut	5	2	7
6	22	MF	(Turkey)	Nazlıcan Parlak	3	1	4
7	18	MF	(Azerbaijan)	Kristina Bakarandze	2	0	2
8	3	DF	(Norway)	Ina Kristoffersen	1	0	1
8	4	DF	(Nigeria)	Oluwatosin Demehin	1	0	1
8	5	DF	(Turkey)	Eda Karataş	1	0	1
8	8	MF	(Turkey)	Emine Ecem Esen	1	0	1
8	15	MF	(Turkey)	Berra Pekgöz	1	0	1
8	19	FW	(Nigeria)	Flourish Sabastine	1	0	1
8	24	MF	(Turkey)	Arzu Akkurt	1	0	1
8	77	MF	(Turkey)	İrem Eren	1	0	1
Own goals					1	0	1
Awarded					6	0	6
Totals					73	14	87

Last updated: 4 May 2025.
Source: TFF.org, UEFA.com

=== Hat-tricks ===
Player	Against	Result	Date	Competition	Ref
(Senegal) Hapsatou Malado Diallo	BIIK Shymkent	5–0 (A)	7 September 2024	Champions League	
(Turkey) Ebru Topçu	Çekmeköy BilgiDoğa Spor	11–0 (A)	11 September 2024	Super League	
(Czech Republic) Andrea Stašková	Amed Sportif Faaliyetler	4–1 (H)	3 November 2024	Super League	
(Cameroon) Marie Ngah	Çekmeköy BilgiDoğa Spor	9–0 (H)	26 January 2025	Super League	
(Cameroon) Marie Ngah^{4}	Ünye Kadın Spor Kulübü	8–1 (A)	2 February 2025	Super League	

(H) – Home; (A) – Away
^{4} Player scored four goals

=== Clean sheets ===
Rank	No.	Pos	Nat	Name	Super League	Champions League	Total
1	1	GK	(Turkey)	Gamze Nur Yaman	4	1	5
2	17	GK	(Turkey)	Handan Kurğa	2	0	2
Totals					6	1	7

Last updated: 4 May 2025.
Source: TFF.org, UEFA.com

=== Disciplinary records ===
No.	Pos	Nat	Name	Super League			Champions League			Total		
No.	Pos	Nat	Name	Booked	(yellow card) (yellow-red card)	Sent off (straight red)	Booked	(yellow card) (yellow-red card)	Sent off (straight red)	Booked	(yellow card) (yellow-red card)	Sent off (straight red)
1	GK	(Turkey)	Gamze Nur Yaman	1	0	0	1	0	0	2	0	0
2	DF	(United States)	Jazmin Wardlow	0	0	0	2	0	0	2	0	0
4	DF	(Nigeria)	Oluwatosin Demehin	7	0	0	2	0	0	9	0	0
5	DF	(Turkey)	Eda Karataş	1	0	1	1	0	0	2	0	1
7	MF	(Turkey)	Arzu Karabulut	1	0	0	1	0	0	2	0	0
8	MF	(Turkey)	Emine Ecem Esen	2	0	0	2	0	0	4	0	0
11	FW	(Colombia)	Catalina Usme	1	0	0	1	0	0	2	0	0
12	FW	(Czech Republic)	Andrea Stašková	0	0	0	1	0	0	1	0	0
13	DF	(Turkey)	Fatma Sare Öztürk	2	0	0	0	0	0	2	0	0
16	FW	(Turkey)	Ebru Topçu	4	0	0	0	0	0	4	0	0
17	GK	(Turkey)	Handan Kurğa	1	0	0	1	0	0	2	0	0
18	MF	(Azerbaijan)	Kristina Bakarandze	2	0	1	1	0	0	3	0	1
19	FW	(Nigeria)	Flourish Sabastine	2	0	0	0	0	0	2	0	0
20	DF	(Turkey)	Berna Yeniçeri	0	0	0	1	0	0	1	0	0
21	MF	(Turkey)	Ecem Cumert	2	0	0	1	0	0	3	0	0
24	DF	(Turkey)	Arzu Akkurt	3	0	0	0	0	0	3	0	0
99	FW	(Turkey)	Benan Altıntaş	0	0	0	2	0	0	2	0	0
Totals				29	0	2	17	0	0	46	0	2

Last updated: 4 May 2025.
Source: TFF.org, UEFA.com

=== Game as captain ===
Rank	No.	Pos	Nat	Name	Super League	Champions League	Total
1	8	MF	(Turkey)	Emine Ecem Esen	13	7	20
2	16	FW	(Turkey)	Ebru Topçu	11	2	13
3	1	GK	(Turkey)	Gamze Nur Yaman	0	1	1
Totals					24	10	34

Last updated: 4 May 2025.
Source: TFF.org, UEFA.com
