= 2022–23 Galatasaray S.K. (women's football) season =

Galatasaray Petrol Ofisi
2022–23 season
- Chairman: Dursun Özbek
- Head coach: Metin Ülgen
- Stadium: Florya Metin Oktay Facilities
- Turkish Women's Football Super League: Group B, 1st
- Play-offs: Semifinals
- Top goalscorer: League: Yağmur Uraz (26); All: Yağmur Uraz (26)
Home colours	Away colours	Third colours

The 2022–23 season was the second season of the women's football team of Galatasaray Sports Club.

== Overview ==
=== August ===
In the notification made on 10 August 2022, it was announced that the ways were parted with the Technical Director Nurcan Çelik, whose contract had expired.

On 11 August 2022, it was announced that an agreement was reached with Metin Ülgen for the position of Technical Director.

=== October ===
Group draw and fixtures in the Turkish Women's Football Super League were held on 6 October 2022 in Istanbul with the participation of Federation officials and club representatives.

== Kits ==
- Supplier: Nike
- Name sponsor: Petrol Ofisi
- Main sponsor: Petrol Ofisi

- Back sponsor: Tunç Holding
- Sleeve sponsor: Arzum

- Short sponsor: —
- Socks sponsor: Polar Dış Ticaret

== Squad information ==
As of 4 February 2023

No.	Name	Nat	Since	Date of birth (age)	Signed from
Goalkeepers
17	Handan Kurğa	(Turkey)	2022	10 September 1993 (age 33)	(Turkey) Konak Belediyespor
25	Büşra Kenet	(Turkey)	2021	27 June 2000 (age 26)	(Turkey) Fatih Vatan Spor
32	Gamze Nur Yaman	(Turkey)	2022	25 April 1999 (age 27)	(Ukraine) WFC Zhytlobud-2 Kharkiv
88	Müge İnan	(Turkey)	2022	5 January 1994 (age 32)	(Turkey) Fatih Karagümrük
Defenders
2	İrem Barut	(Turkey)	2022	8 October 2004 (age 21)	(Turkey) Yukatel Kayserispor
3	İlayda Uğur	(Turkey)	2021	9 July 1999 (age 27)	(Turkey) Akdeniz Nurçelik Spor
4	Li Jiayue	(China)	2023	8 June 1990 (age 36)	(China) Shanghai Shengli
5	Milica Denda (captain)	(Serbia)	2021	11 December 2002 (age 23)	(Serbia) ŽFK Spartak Subotica
6	Derya Arhan	(Turkey)	2022	25 January 1999 (age 27)	(Turkey) Fatih Karagümrük
20	Berna Yeniçeri	(Turkey)	2022	26 January 1996 (age 30)	(Turkey) Beşiktaş
27	Naomie Kabakaba	(Democratic Republic of the Congo)	2023	4 February 1998 (age 28)	(Democratic Republic of the Congo) TP Mazembe
61	Fatma Sare Öztürk	(Turkey)	2022	5 July 2000 (age 26)	(Turkey) Trabzonspor
Midfielders
8	Emine Ecem Esen	(Turkey)	2022	3 May 1994 (age 32)	(Turkey) ALG Spor
10	İsmigül Yalçıner	(Turkey)	2021	20 October 1994 (age 31)	(Turkey) Kireçburnu Spor
13	Birgül Sadıkoğlu	(Turkey)	2022	23 March 2000 (age 26)	(Ukraine) WFC Zhytlobud-1 Kharkiv
18	Kristina Bakarandze	(Azerbaijan)	2022	19 May 1998 (age 28)	(Turkey) ALG Spor
19	Zehra Yılmaz	(Turkey)	2022	5 July 2002 (age 24)	(Turkey) Bursa Soğanlı Spor
21	Didem Dülber	(Turkey)	2021	21 March 2001 (age 25)	(Turkey) ALG Spor
23	İlayda Civelek	(Turkey)	2022	6 July 1998 (age 28)	(Turkey) ALG Spor
24	Arzu Akkurt	(Turkey)	2021	1 July 2004 (age 22)	(Turkey) 1207 Antalya Spor
28	Zeynep Ece Güneş	(Turkey)	2021	23 October 2004 (age 21)	(Turkey) Kireçburnu Spor
33	Serpil Özer	(Turkey)	2021	3 March 2001 (age 25)	(Turkey) Akdeniz Nurçelik Spor
Forwards
7	Erva Karaovalı	(Turkey)	2022	22 March 2002 (age 24)	(Turkey) Kocaeli Bayan FK
9	Elanur Laçın	(Turkey)	2021	4 August 2004 (age 22)	(Turkey) Kireçburnu Spor
11	Yağmur Uraz	(Turkey)	2022	19 February 1990 (age 36)	(Turkey) Beşiktaş
16	Ebru Topçu	(Turkey)	2022	27 August 1996 (age 30)	(Turkey) ALG Spor
22	Elena Gracinda Santos	(South Africa)	2022	6 February 1997 (age 29)	(United States) NJ/NY Gotham FC
Player(s) transferred out during this season
30	Emine Demir	(Turkey)	2022	11 November 1993 (age 32)	(Turkey) Fatih Vatan Spor

== Transfers and loans ==
=== Contracts renewals ===
Date	No.	Position	Player	Contract ends	Ref.
10 August 2022	44	DF	(Serbia) Milica Denda	2023	

=== In ===
Date	No.	Pos.	Player	From	Fee	Source
9 August 2022	20	DF	(Turkey) Berna Yeniçeri	(Turkey) Beşiktaş	Undisclosed	
9 August 2022	6	DF	(Turkey) Derya Arhan	(Turkey) Fatih Karagümrük	Undisclosed	
9 August 2022	16	FW	(Turkey) Ebru Topçu	(Turkey) ALG Spor	Undisclosed	
9 August 2022	8	MF	(Turkey) Emine Ecem Esen	(Turkey) ALG Spor	Undisclosed	
10 August 2022	17	GK	(Turkey) Handan Kurğa	(Turkey) Konak Belediyespor	Undisclosed	
10 August 2022	23	MF	(Turkey) İlayda Civelek	(Turkey) ALG Spor	Undisclosed	
10 August 2022	11	FW	(Turkey) Yağmur Uraz	(Turkey) Beşiktaş	Undisclosed	
22 August 2022	30	DF	(Turkey) Emine Demir	(Turkey) Fatih Vatan Spor	Undisclosed	
22 August 2022	88	GK	(Turkey) Müge İnan	(Turkey) Fatih Karagümrük	Undisclosed	
13 September 2022	18	MF	(Azerbaijan) Kristina Bakarandze	(Turkey) ALG Spor	Undisclosed	
13 September 2022	61	DF	(Turkey) Fatma Sare Öztürk	(Turkey) Trabzonspor	Undisclosed	
5 January 2023	4	DF	(China) Li Jiayue	(China) Shanghai Shengli	Undisclosed	
4 February 2023	27	DF	(Democratic Republic of the Congo) Naomie Kabakaba	(Democratic Republic of the Congo) TP Mazembe	Undisclosed	

=== Out ===
Date	No.	Pos.	Player	To	Fee	Source
30 June 2022	6	DF	(Turkey) Cemre Kara		End of contract	
30 June 2022	17	MF	(Turkey) Buse Çolak		End of contract	
30 June 2022	23	DF	(Turkey) Fadime Kurnaz		End of contract	
30 June 2022	78	MF	(Colombia) Angie Sandrith Telles Ortiz		End of contract	
20 July 2022	77	MF	(Brazil) Amanda Ferreira De Alencar	(Brazil) Esporte Clube Bahia	End of contract	
25 July 2022	61	DF	(Turkey) İlayda Gündoğdu		End of contract	
25 July 2022	14	FW	(Bosnia and Herzegovina) Dajana Spasojević	(Bosnia and Herzegovina) SFK 2000	End of contract	
26 July 2022	11	MF	(Turkey) Elif Kesgin	(Turkey) Telsiz Spor	End of contract	
26 July 2022	1	GK	(Turkey) Evin Dinçer	(Turkey) Fatih Karagümrük	End of contract	
7 September 2022	67	MF	(Turkey) Gülhanım Doğan	(Turkey) Adana Demirspor	End of contract	
23 September 2022	99	MF	(Egypt) Samia Adam	(Italy) Napoli Femminile	End of contract	
11 October 2022	22	DF	(Nigeria) Ijeoma Queenth Daniels	(Turkey) Trabzonspor	End of contract	
15 October 2022	19	MF	(Turkey) Gözde Gül	(Turkey) Altay	End of contract	
15 October 2022	4	DF	(Turkey) Yaren Çetin	(Turkey) Altay	End of contract	
19 October 2022	5	DF	(Turkey) Zeynep Nisa Üner	(Turkey) Çatalca Belediye Spor	End of contract	
27 December 2022	30	DF	(Turkey) Emine Demir	(Turkey) Fatih Vatan Spor	Undisclosed	

=== Loan out ===
Date	Until	No.	Pos.	Player	To	Fee	Source
13 August 2022	End of season	66	GK	(Turkey) Sude Nur Sözüdoğru	(Turkey) Horozkent Spor	Undisclosed	

== Management team ==
Position	Staff
Head Coach	(Turkey) Metin Ülgen
Sporting Director	(Turkey) Vahit Mert
Assistant Sporting Director	(Turkey) Gülfem Kocaoğlu
Assistant Coach	(Turkey) Hilal Başkol
Goalkeeping Coach	(Turkey) Yunus Ulucan
Physiotherapist	(Turkey) Gülin Köseoğlu
Analyst	(Turkey) Birkan İpek

Last updated: 6 September 2022
Source: Galatasaray SK

== Pre-season and friendlies ==
Win Draw Loss Fixtures

=== Pre-season ===
15 September 2022 Friendly	Galatasaray Petrol Ofisi	4–0	Horozkent Spor Kulübü	Afyonkarahisar
17:00 TRT	Santos 9', 22'; Yalçıner 87', 89'	Report		Stadium: Afyon Gençlik Spor Tesisleri

1 October 2022 Friendly	Nigeria U-17	3–1	Galatasaray Petrol Ofisi
		Report

9 October 2022 Friendly	Galatasaray Petrol Ofisi	4–0	Fatih Vatan Spor	Istanbul
	Santos 18', 48'; Esen 34'; Uraz 69'	Report		Stadium: Florya Metin Oktay Facilities

=== Mid-season ===
22 February 2023 Friendly	Galatasaray Petrol Ofisi	6–0	İstanbul Telsiz Spor	Istanbul
	Topçu; Santos; Kabakaba	Report		Stadium: Florya Metin Oktay Facilities

25 February 2023 Friendly	Beylerbeyi Spor Kulübü	0–5	Galatasaray Petrol Ofisi	Istanbul
		Report	Santos 26'; Topçu 36'; Arhan 51'; Kabakaba 75', 80'	Stadium: Beylerbeyi 75. Yıl Stadium

== Competitions ==
=== Overall record ===
Competition	First match	Last match	Starting round	Final position	Record							
Competition	First match	Last match	Starting round	Final position	Pld	W	D	L	GF	GA	GD	Win %
Super League	16 October 2022	18 March 2023	Matchday 1	1st	18	17	0	1	84	9	+75	94.44
Super League Play-offs	3 May 2023	20 May 2023	Quarterfinals	Semifinals	4	2	1	1	10	5	+5	50.00
Total					22	19	1	2	94	14	+80	86.36

Last updated: 20 May 2023
Source: FootyStats

=== Turkish Women's Football Super League ===
==== League table (Group B) ====
Pos	Team	Pld	W	D	L	GF	GA	GD	Pts	Qualification or relegation
1	Galatasaray	18	17	0	1	84	9	+75	51	Quarterfinals
2	Ankara BB FOMGET (C)	18	16	1	1	65	11	+54	49	First round
3	Fenerbahçe	18	11	3	4	66	10	+56	36	First round
4	Amed	18	8	4	6	31	22	+9	28	First round
5	1207 Antalyaspor	18	7	4	7	32	25	+7	25	First round
6	Ataşehir Bld.	18	6	3	9	35	51	−16	21	First round
7	Konak Bld.	18	6	2	10	32	39	−7	20	First round
8	Trabzonspor (O)	18	5	2	11	27	29	−2	17	Play-out
9	Adana İdmanyurdu (Note: Adana İdmanyurdu withdrew from the league, following the 2023 Turkey–Syria earthquake, and were not relegated at the end of the season.)	18	4	1	13	20	37	−17	13	
10	Kireçburnu (Note: Kireçburnu had 3 points deducted.) (R)	18	0	0	18	8	167	−159	−3	Play-out

Source: TFF.org
(C) Champions; (O) Play-out winner; (R) Relegated

==== Results summary ====
Overall								Home						Away					
Pld	W	D	L	GF	GA	GD	Pts	W	D	L	GF	GA	GD	W	D	L	GF	GA	GD
18	17	0	1	84	9	+75	51	9	0	0	42	3	+39	8	0	1	42	6	+36

Last updated: 18 March 2023.
Source: Competitive matches

==== Results by matchday ====
Round	1	2	3	4	5	6	7	8	9	10	11	12	13	14	15	16	17	18
Ground	H	A	A	H	A	H	A	H	A	A	H	H	A	H	A	H	A	H
Result	W	W	W	W	W	W	W	W	L	W	W	W	W	W	W	W	W	W
Position	4	2	2	2	2	2	1	1	2	2	2	2	2	2	2	2	2	1

Updated to match(es) played on 18 March 2023. Source: Competitive matches
A = Away; H = Home; W = Win; D = Draw; L = Loss

==== Matches ====
16 October 2022 1	Galatasaray Petrol Ofisi	1–0	Trabzonspor	Istanbul
12:00 TRT	Yeniçeri (yellow card) 53'; Topçu 90+2' (pen.)	Report 1 Report 2	Şentürk (yellow card) 53' (yellow-red card) 90+3'; Hajiyeva (yellow card) 90+1'	Stadium: Florya Metin Oktay Facilities; Referee: Oktay Koçak; Assistant referees: Mustafa Cem Büyük, Erdem Birşey; Fourth official: Cemal Nair

22 October 2022 2	Fenerbahçe Petrol Ofisi	2–3	Galatasaray Petrol Ofisi	Istanbul
15:00 TRT	Cordner 25'; Şeker (yellow card) 45+1'; Coleman 49'; Çal (yellow card) 72'	Report 1 Report 2	Denda (yellow card) 12' (goal) 45+2'; Demir (yellow card) 27'; Yeniçeri (yellow card) 45'; Uraz 84'; Topçu 90'; Bakarandze (yellow card) 90+1'	Stadium: Beylerbeyi 75. Yıl Stadium; Referee: Muhammed Ömür; Assistant referees: Burak Menteşe, Ömer Okumuş; Fourth official: Muhammed Emin Gül

29 October 2022 3	1207 Antalya Spor	0–2	Galatasaray Petrol Ofisi	Antalya
12:00 TRT		Report 1 Report 2	Esen 31' (yellow card) 58'; Uraz 88'	Stadium: Zeytinköy 2 Nolu Saha; Referee: Hakan Yurtseven; Assistant referees: Duygu Kabataş, Engin Altınay; Fourth official: Mehmet Murat Toprak

6 November 2022 4	Galatasaray Petrol Ofisi	5–0	Ataşehir Belediyespor	Istanbul
12:00 TRT	Sadıkoğlu 6'; Uraz 22', 30'; Topçu 33'; Denda 48'	Report 1 Report 2	Aku (yellow card) 88'	Stadium: Florya Metin Oktay Facilities; Referee: Seyfettin Alper Yılmaz; Assistant referees: Hüseyin Can, Figen Eleman; Fourth official: Tuğçe Duman

20 November 2022 5	Amed	0–3	Galatasaray Petrol Ofisi	Diyarbakır
12:00 TRT	Asiamah (yellow card) 68'	Report 1 Report 2	Civelek 10'; Topçu 66'; Santos 76'	Stadium: Amedspor Tesisleri Sentetik Saha; Referee: Bülent Berkay; Assistant referees: Enes Selis, Erkan İlbak; Fourth official: Mustafa İnan

27 November 2022 6	Galatasaray Petrol Ofisi	3–0	Adana İdman Yurdu	Istanbul
12:00 TRT	Topçu 12'; Uraz 30'; Arhan (yellow card) 34'; Denda (yellow card) 42'; Yalçıner 83'	Report 1 Report 2	Seyfatdinova (yellow card) 45+1'; Balur (yellow card) 68'	Stadium: Florya Metin Oktay Facilities; Referee: Uğurcan Şanlı; Assistant referees: Neslihan Koç, Emrah Topal; Fourth official: Yonca Karagöz

4 December 2022 7	Konak Belediyespor	1–3	Galatasaray Petrol Ofisi	İzmir
12:00 TRT	Morales (yellow card) 37'; Ünal (yellow card) 50'; İsgi 57'; Ibrahim (yellow card) 81'	Report 1 Report 2	Demir 18'; Topçu 38'; Bakarandze 63'; Santos (yellow card) 81'	Stadium: Atatürk 1 Nolu Yan Saha; Referee: Aykut Çetinkaya; Assistant referees: Sami Menteş, Tolga Düyüncü; Fourth official: Ercan Kırık

11 December 2022 8	Galatasaray Petrol Ofisi	13–1	Kireçburnu Spor	Istanbul
12:00 TRT	Esen 13'; Arhan 23'; Uraz 25', 31', 39', 43', 51'; Sadıkoğlu 26', 32', 56'; Topçu 62'; Denda 72'; Santos 80'	Report 1 Report 2	Sivrikaya 20'	Stadium: Florya Metin Oktay Facilities; Referee: Emine Öz; Assistant referees: Batuhan Sarıgül, Nazmihan Öterbülbül; Fourth official: Şenol Susam

17 December 2022 9	Fomget Gençlik ve Spor	1–0	Galatasaray Petrol Ofisi	Sincan, Ankara
13:00 TRT	Shevchuk 16'; Apanashchenko (yellow card) 36'; Shmatko (yellow card) 90+2'; Şahin (yellow card) 90+5'	Report 1 Report 2	Kurğa (yellow card) 36'; Bakarandze (yellow card) 41'; Santos (yellow card) 49'; Civelek (yellow card) 70'	Stadium: Osmanlı Stadium; Referee: Deha Emre Kebapçı; Assistant referees: İhsan Öncü, İlknur Ülker; Fourth official: Kübra Çetinkaya

8 January 2023 10	Trabzonspor	2–6	Galatasaray Petrol Ofisi	Trabzon
12:00 TRT	Mfwamba 56', 77'	Report 1 Report 2	Uraz 28', 45'; Civelek 34'; Esen (yellow card) 55'; Topçu 67'; Denda 72'; Santos 87'	Stadium: Trabzonspor Kadir Özcan Tesisleri; Referee: İrfan Çağrı Baş; Assistant referees: Ahmet Emre Akbulut, Furkan Şekerci; Fourth official: Yeter Günaçar

15 January 2023 11	Galatasaray Petrol Ofisi	2–0	Fenerbahçe Petrol Ofisi	Istanbul
15:00 TRT	Yeniçeri (yellow card) 7'; Civelek (yellow card) 20'; Jiayue (yellow card) 28'; Uraz 45+3'; Topçu 62'; Esen (yellow card) 69'; Denda (yellow card) 86'; Santos (yellow card) 90+1'; Kurğa (yellow card) 90+5'	Report 1 Report 2		Stadium: Florya Metin Oktay Facilities; Referee: Oğuzhan Talha Karakuş; Assistant referees: Hüseyin Balkaya, Yücel Alkaşi; Fourth official: Remzi Mert Coşkun

18 January 2023 12	Galatasaray Petrol Ofisi	5–0	1207 Antalya Spor	Istanbul
12:00 TRT	Sadıkoğlu 20'; Uraz 41'; Yılmaz 66'; Santos 83'; Yalçıner 90+3'	Report 1 Report 2	Amankrah (yellow card) 83'	Stadium: Florya Metin Oktay Facilities; Referee: Emre Koç; Assistant referees: Samet Karaçay, Semih Tuna; Fourth official: Soner Koncagül

22 January 2023 13	Ataşehir Belediyespor	0–9	Galatasaray Petrol Ofisi	Istanbul
12:00 TRT		Report 1 Report 2	Uraz 16', 26'; Topçu 33'; Santos (yellow card) 49' (goal) 82', 87'; Sadıkoğlu 53', 56'; Yeniçeri 84', 89'	Stadium: İBB Esatpaşa Stadı; Referee: İlayda Nihal Çetiner; Assistant referees: Arzu Görgün, Ceyda Gülşen; Fourth official: Tayfun Demirkoparan

29 January 2023 14	Galatasaray Petrol Ofisi	4–2	Amed	Istanbul
12:00 TRT	Uraz 11', 71'; Sadıkoğlu 51'; Civelek (yellow card) 81'; Topçu 84'	Report 1 Report 2	Çavur 14'; Taş 17'; Seyfatdinova (yellow card) 81'	Stadium: Florya Metin Oktay Facilities; Referee: Elif Köroğlu; Assistant referees: Muhammed Şamil Göçgün, Görkem Sağlam; Fourth official: Deniz Güven

5 February 2023 15	Adana İdman Yurdu	0–3	Galatasaray Petrol Ofisi	Adana
13:00 TRT	Benie (yellow card) 24'; Soumah (yellow card) 90'	Report 1 Report 2	Kabakaba 3'; Santos 9' (yellow card) 75'; Sadıkoğlu 18'; Jiayue (yellow card) 43'	Stadium: Muharrem Gülergin Futbol Sahası; Referee: Hacı Hanifi Evgi; Assistant referees: Alişan Küçükkoçak, Emine Erim; Fourth official: Esra Sağlam

5 March 2023 16	Galatasaray Petrol Ofisi	5–0	Konak Belediyespor	Istanbul
12:00 TRT	Sadıkoğlu 12', 31', 45'; Bakarandze 42'; Topçu 52' (pen.)	Report 1 Report 2	Tetik (yellow card) 74'	Stadium: Florya Metin Oktay Facilities; Referee: Mete Aylıoğlu; Assistant referees: Kenan Gürsel, Hayri Atahan Olgun; Fourth official: Kerem Kurum
Note: Originally scheduled to be played on 11 February 2023. Postponed due to the 2023 Turkey–Syria earthquake.

12 March 2023 17	Kireçburnu Spor	0–13	Galatasaray Petrol Ofisi	Istanbul
12:00 TRT		Report 1 Report 2	Uraz 9', 17', 20', 64', 90'; Kabakaba 14', 16', 23', 83', 85'; Topçu 26'; Yalçıner 31'; Barut 89'	Stadium: Çayırbaşı Stadium; Referee: Mustafa Demir; Assistant referees: Ali Kış, Burak Çınar; Fourth official: Halil İbrahim Ekmekçi
Note: Originally scheduled to be played on 26 February 2023. Postponed due to the 2023 Turkey–Syria earthquake.

18 March 2023 18	Galatasaray Petrol Ofisi	4–0	Fomget Gençlik ve Spor	Istanbul
12:00 TRT	Kabakaba 20', 89'; Yeniçeri 41' (yellow card) 87'; Topçu 59' (yellow card) 72'	Report 1 Report 2	Küçük (yellow card) 41'; Shevchuk (yellow card) 41'	Stadium: Florya Metin Oktay Facilities; Referee: Sevcan Özkar; Assistant referees: Harun Ödübek, Furkan Çukuryurt; Fourth official: Yunus Emre Bulut

==== Play–offs ====
===== Quarter–finals =====
3 May 2023 First leg	Amed	1–5	Galatasaray Petrol Ofisi	Diyarbakır
12:00 TRT	Benie 36'	Report 1 Report 2	Jiayue (yellow card) 6'; Topçu 20' 73'; Sadıkoğlu 55'; Uraz 66' 77'	Stadium: Amedspor Tesisleri Sentetik Saha; Referee: Enes Ahi; Assistant referees: Abdullah Özcan, Melih Eser; Fourth official: Emrullah Baydar

7 May 2023 Second leg	Galatasaray Petrol Ofisi	3–0 (8–1 agg.)	Amed	Istanbul
12:00 TRT	Santos 21'; Bakarandze (yellow card) 34' (goal) 53'; Esen (yellow card) 70'; Uraz 84'	Report 1 Report 2	Alçu (yellow card) 34'; Taş (yellow card) 37'; Asiamah (yellow card) 52'; Seyfatdinova (yellow card) 87'	Stadium: Florya Metin Oktay Facilities; Referee: Mert Aylıoğlu; Assistant referees: Serkan Aydın, Berkin Çokal; Fourth official: Abdullah Korkmaz

===== Semi–finals =====
13 May 2023 First leg	Fenerbahçe Petrol Ofisi	2–0	Galatasaray Petrol Ofisi	Istanbul
15:00 TRT	Marcano 2'; Kusi 62'	Report 1 Report 2	Civelek (yellow card) 60'; Bakarandze (yellow card) 89'	Stadium: Dereağzı Lefter Küçükandonyadis Facilities; Referee: Melis Özçiğdem; Assistant referees: Fatih Söyler, Gökhan Özkan; Fourth official: Berk Sipahi

20 May 2023 Second leg	Galatasaray Petrol Ofisi	2–2 (2–4 agg.)	Fenerbahçe Petrol Ofisi	Istanbul
12:00 TRT	Sadıkoğlu (yellow card) 45+1'; Topçu 56' (pen.); Yeniçeri (yellow card) 67' (goal) 85'; Santos (yellow card) 90+3'; Jiayue (yellow card) end of match'	Report 1 Report 2	Marcano 1'; Çal (yellow card) 90+2'; Coleman (yellow card) 37' (goal) 90+3' (pen.)	Stadium: Florya Metin Oktay Facilities; Referee: Gamze Durmuş Pakkan; Assistant referees: Caner Kurt, Selçuk Gökgöz; Fourth official: Efe Tanrıverdi

== Statistics ==
=== Appearances and goals ===
No.	Pos.	Player	Süper Lig		Total	
No.	Pos.	Player	Apps	Goals	Apps	Goals
2	DF	(Turkey) İrem Barut	2	1	2	1
3	DF	(Turkey) İlayda Uğur	1	0	1	0
4	DF	(China) Li Jiayue	13	0	13	0
5	DF	(Serbia) Milica Denda	20	4	20	4
6	DF	(Turkey) Derya Arhan	22	1	22	1
7	FW	(Turkey) Erva Karaovalı	0	0	0	0
8	MF	(Turkey) Emine Ecem Esen	17	2	17	2
9	FW	(Turkey) Elanur Laçın	0	0	0	0
10	MF	(Turkey) İsmigül Yalçıner	15	3	15	3
11	FW	(Turkey) Yağmur Uraz	21	26	21	26
13	MF	(Turkey) Birgül Sadıkoğlu	20	13	20	13
16	FW	(Turkey) Ebru Topçu	22	17	22	17
17	GK	(Turkey) Handan Kurğa	14	0	14	0
18	MF	(Azerbaijan) Kristina Bakarandze	21	3	21	3
19	MF	(Turkey) Zehra Yılmaz	11	1	11	1
20	DF	(Turkey) Berna Yeniçeri	21	4	21	4
21	MF	(Turkey) Didem Dülber	11	0	11	0
22	FW	(South Africa) Elena Gracinda Santos	21	8	21	8
23	MF	(Turkey) İlayda Civelek	20	2	20	2
24	MF	(Turkey) Arzu Akkurt	3	0	3	0
25	GK	(Turkey) Büşra Kenet	5	0	5	0
27	DF	(Democratic Republic of the Congo) Naomie Kabakaba	7	8	7	8
28	MF	(Turkey) Zeynep Ece Güneş	5	0	5	0
32	GK	(Turkey) Gamze Nur Yaman	7	0	7	0
33	MF	(Turkey) Serpil Özer	5	0	5	0
61	DF	(Turkey) Fatma Sare Öztürk	16	0	16	0
88	GK	(Turkey) Müge İnan	0	0	0	0
Player(s) transferred out but featured this season
30	DF	(Turkey) Emine Demir	7	1	7	1

Last updated: 20 May 2023.
Source: TFF.org

=== Goalscorers ===
Rank	No.	Pos.	Player	Süper Lig	Total
1	11	FW	(Turkey) Yağmur Uraz	26	26
2	16	FW	(Turkey) Ebru Topçu	17	17
3	13	MF	(Turkey) Birgül Sadıkoğlu	13	13
4	22	FW	(South Africa) Elena Gracinda Santos	8	8
4	27	DF	(Democratic Republic of the Congo) Naomie Kabakaba	8	8
5	5	DF	(Serbia) Milica Denda	4	4
5	20	DF	(Turkey) Berna Yeniçeri	4	4
6	10	MF	(Turkey) İsmigül Yalçıner	3	3
6	18	MF	(Azerbaijan) Kristina Bakarandze	3	3
7	8	MF	(Turkey) Emine Ecem Esen	2	2
7	23	MF	(Turkey) İlayda Civelek	2	2
8	2	DF	(Turkey) İrem Barut	1	1
8	6	DF	(Turkey) Derya Arhan	1	1
8	19	MF	(Turkey) Zehra Yılmaz	1	1
8	30	DF	(Turkey) Emine Demir	1	1
Own goals				0	0
Totals				94	94

Last updated: 20 May 2023.
Source: TFF.org

=== Clean sheets ===
Rank	No.	Pos.	Player	Süper Lig	Total
1	17	GK	(Turkey) Handan Kurğa	9	9
2	32	GK	(Turkey) Gamze Nur Yaman	3	3
3	25	GK	(Turkey) Büşra Kenet	1	1
4	88	GK	(Turkey) Müge İnan	0	0
Totals				13	13

Last updated: 20 May 2023.
Source: TFF.org

=== Disciplinary records ===
No.	Pos.	Player	Süper Lig			Total		
No.	Pos.	Player	Booked	(yellow card) (yellow-red card)	Sent off (straight red)	Booked	(yellow card) (yellow-red card)	Sent off (straight red)
4	DF	(China) Li Jiayue	4	0	0	4	0	0
5	DF	(Serbia) Milica Denda	3	0	0	3	0	0
6	DF	(Turkey) Derya Arhan	1	0	0	1	0	0
8	MF	(Turkey) Emine Ecem Esen	4	0	0	4	0	0
13	MF	(Turkey) Birgül Sadıkoğlu	1	0	0	1	0	0
16	FW	(Turkey) Ebru Topçu	1	0	0	1	0	0
17	GK	(Turkey) Handan Kurğa	2	0	0	2	0	0
18	MF	(Azerbaijan) Kristina Bakarandze	4	0	0	4	0	0
20	DF	(Turkey) Berna Yeniçeri	5	0	0	5	0	0
22	FW	(South Africa) Elena Gracinda Santos	6	0	0	6	0	0
23	MF	(Turkey) İlayda Civelek	4	0	0	4	0	0
30	DF	(Turkey) Emine Demir	1	0	0	1	0	0
Totals			36	0	0	36	0	0

Last updated: 20 May 2023.
Source: TFF.org

=== Game as captain ===
Rank	No.	Pos.	Player	Süper Lig	Total
1	5	DF	(Serbia) Milica Denda	20	20
2	8	MF	(Turkey) Emine Ecem Esen	1	1
3	32	GK	(Turkey) Gamze Nur Yaman	1	1
Totals				22	22

Last updated: 20 May 2023.
Source: TFF.org
