= Laura Domínguez =

Spanish footballer (born 1997)

Personal information
- Full name: Laura Domínguez Rojo
- Date of birth: 12 August 1997 (age 29)
- Place of birth: Madrid, Spain
- Height: 1.59 m (5 ft 3 in)
- Position: Wing-back

Team information
- Current team: Parma
- Number: 18

Senior career*
| Years | Team | Apps | (Gls) |
| 2013–2016 | Madrid CFF | | |
| 2016–2018 | Rayo Vallecano | 55 | (4) |
| 2018–2025 | Madrid CFF | 100 | (5) |
| 2025 | Galatasaray | 12 | (0) |
| 2025– | Parma | 22 | (0) |
- * Club domestic league appearances and goals as of 17 May 2026 (UTC)

Laura Domínguez Rojo (born 12 August 1997), often known as Laurita, is a Spanish professional footballer who plays as a Defender for Serie A club Parma.

== Club career ==
=== Madrid CFF ===
Domínguez started her career at Madrid CFF.

=== Galatasaray ===
On 11 January 2025 she signed a contract with Turkish giant Galatasaray until the end of the 2024–25 season.In the statement made by Galatasaray club on July 20, 2025, it was said that we thank you for your efforts and wish you success in your future careers.

=== Parma ===
On 12 July 2025, Italian Serie A club Parma announced the signing of Laura Domínguez.
