= Li Jiayue =

Chinese footballer (born 1990)

Personal information
- Full name: Li Jiayue
- Date of birth: 8 June 1990 (age 36)
- Place of birth: Shanghai, China
- Height: 1.70 m (5 ft 7 in)
- Position: Defender

Team information
- Current team: Henan Jianye
- Number: 2

Senior career*
Years	Team	Apps	(Gls)
2007–2013	Shanghai Shengli		
2014	Suwon Samsung		
2015–2022	Shanghai Shengli		
2023	Galatasaray	9	(0)
2023-2024	Shanghai Shengli		
2025-	Henan Jianye		

International career^{‡}
2012–	China	72	(3)
Medal record
Women's football
Representing China
Asian Games
Silver medal – second place	2018 Palembang	Team
- * Club domestic league appearances and goals as of 21 March 2023 ‡ National team caps and goals as of 7 June 2019

Li Jiayue (Chinese: 李佳悦; pinyin: Lǐ Jiāyuè; born 8 June 1990) is a Chinese footballer who plays as a defender for Henan Jianye, and the China women's national football team.

== Club career ==
=== Galatasaray ===
On 5 January 2023, the Turkish Women's Football Super League team was transferred to the Galatasaray club.

== International goals ==
No.	Date	Venue	Opponent	Score	Result	Competition
1.	17 August 2018	Gelora Sriwijaya Stadium, Palembang, Indonesia	Hong Kong	4–0	7–0	2018 Asian Games
2.	1 December 2018	Guam Football Association National Training Center, Dededo, Guam	Mongolia	2–0	10–0	2019 EAFF E-1 Football Championship

== Honours ==
China

- Asian Games silver medalist: 2018
- AFC Women's Asian Cup: 2022
