= Handan Kurğa =

Turkish footballer (born 1993)

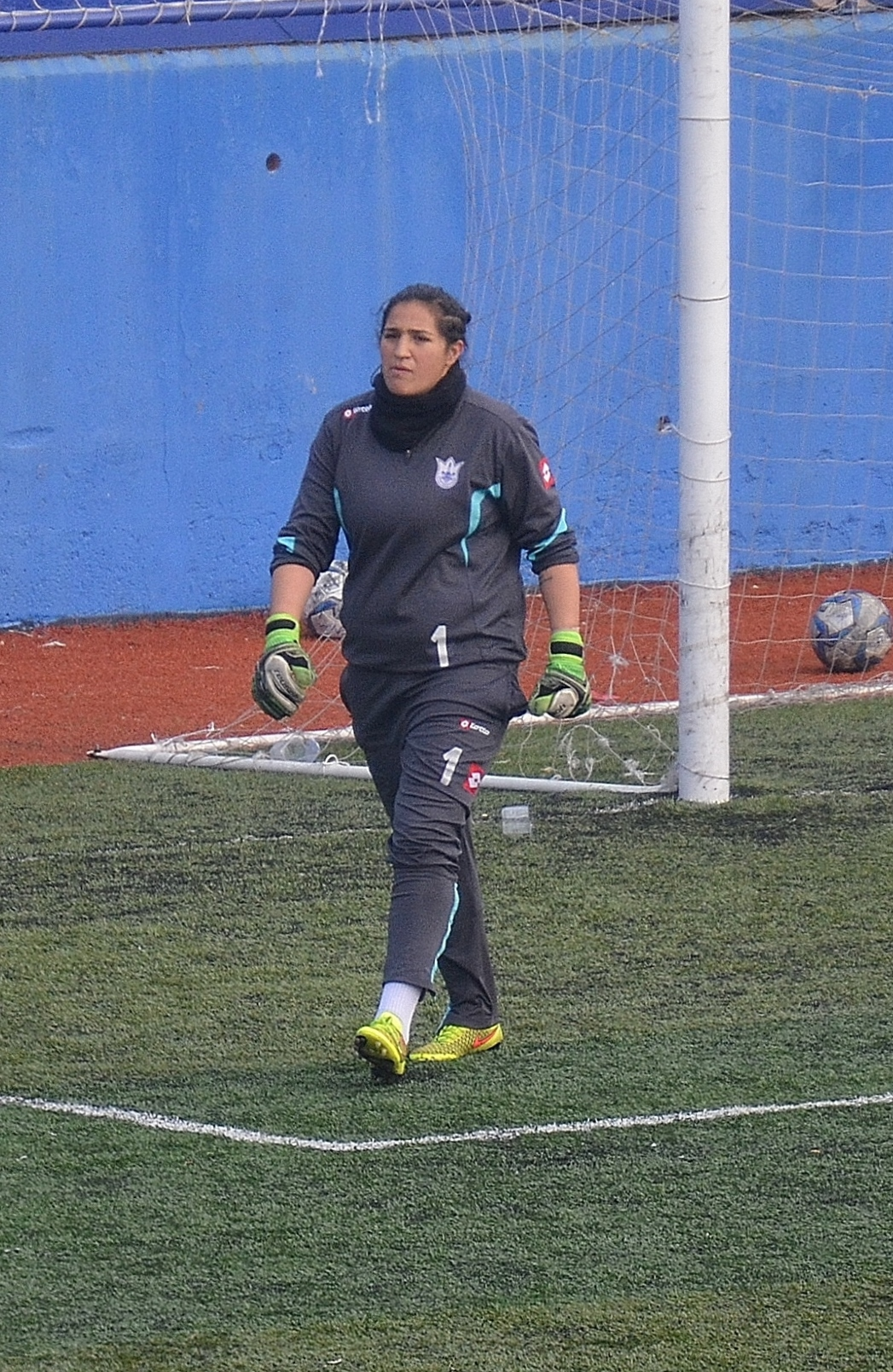
- Kurğa for Konak Belediyespor in 2015

Personal information
- Date of birth: 10 September 1993 (age 33)
- Place of birth: Digor, Kars, Turkey
- Position: Goalkeeper

Senior career*
Years	Team	Apps	(Gls)
2007–2011	Ataşehir Belediyespor	28	(2)
2011–2012	Lüleburgaz 39 Spor	11	(0)
2012–2017	Konak Belediyespor	35	(0)
2017–2018	Ataşehir Belediyespor	10	(0)
2019	ALG Spor	9	(1)
2019–2022	Konak Belediyespor	30	(0)
2022–2025	Galatasaray	27	(0)

International career^{‡}
2008	Turkey U-17	2	(0)
2012	Turkey U-19	2	(0)
2017	Turkey	1	(0)
- * Club domestic league appearances and goals as of 31 July 2025 ‡ National team caps and goals as of 8 April 2017

Handan Kurğa (born 10 September 1993) is a Turkish footballer who plays as a goalkeeper for Turkish Women's First Football League club Galatasaray. She made one appearance for the Turkey national team in 2017.

== Club career ==
=== Ataşehir Belediyespor ===
Kurğa obtained her license during her high school education on 11 May 2007. She became part of her high school's team Düvenciler Lisesispor, which played in the Turkish Women's Second Football League. In the 2009–10 season, the team was renamed Ataşehir Belediyespor and was promoted to the First League. The next season, her team won the league.championship.

=== Lüleburgaz 39 Spor ===
After capping 28 times for Ataşehir Belediyespor, Kurğa transferred to Lüleburgaz 39 Spor in the 2011–12 season, where she played one season only because the team folded.

=== Konak Belediyespor ===
From 19 October 2012 she was the substitute goalkeeper at the Izmir-based Konak Belediyespor, where she enjoyed twice consecutive league champion titles. She spent the games of the 2013–14 UEFA Champions League on the bench. She appeared in two of the three matches of the 2014–15 UEFA Women's Champions League qualifying matches. She appeared twice at the 2015–16 UEFA Women's Champions League qualifying round.

=== Ataşehir Belediyespor ===
In August 2017 she transferred to her former club Ataşehir Belediyespor. At the end of the 2016–17 season, she enjoyed her team's league champion title.

=== ALG Spor ===
In the beginning of the 2018-19 First league season's second half, Kurğa joined the recently promoted Gaziantep-based club ALG Spor. Her team finished the season equal on points with the league leader. They lost the play-off match, and became runners-up.

=== Konak Belediyespor ===
In the 2019-20 Turkish Women's First Football League season, she transferred to her former club Konak Belediyespor.

=== Galatasaray ===
On 10 August 2022, the Turkish Women's Football Super League team was transferred to the Galatasaray club.

She signed a new 1-year contract with Galatasaray on July 31, 2025.

== International career ==
Kurğa became international with the Turkey girls' U-17 team in 2008. She was twice part of the Turkey women's U-19 team.

She debuted in the Turkey senior national team in the 2019 FIFA Women's World Cup qualification – UEFA preliminary round match against Luxembourg on 8 April 2017.

== Career statistics ==
As of match played 17 December 2022

Appearances and goals by club, season and competition
Club	Season	League			National cup		Europe		Total	
Club	Season	Division	Apps	Goals	Apps	Goals	Apps	Goals	Apps	Goals
Ataşehir Belediyespor	2008–09	Second League	8	1	2	0	–		10	1
Ataşehir Belediyespor	2009–10	First League	14	1	0	0	–		14	1
Ataşehir Belediyespor	2010–11	First League	6	0	0	0	–		6	0
Ataşehir Belediyespor	Total		28	2	2	0	0	0	30	2
Lüleburgaz 39 Spor	2011–12	First League	11	0	2	0	–		13	0
Konak Belediyespor	2012–13	First	11	0	0	0	–		11	0
Konak Belediyespor	2013–14	First League	3	0	0	0	–		3	0
Konak Belediyespor	2014–15	First League	2	0	0	0	2	0	4	0
Konak Belediyespor	2015–16	First League	9	0	0	0	2	0	11	0
Konak Belediyespor	2016–17	First League	10	0	1	0	1	0	12	0
Konak Belediyespor	Total		35	0	1	0	5	0	41	0
Ataşehir Belediyespor	2017–18	First League	10	0	0	0	–		10	0
ALG Spor	2018–19	First League	9	1	0	0	–		9	1
Konak Belediyespor	2019–20	First League	8	0	0	0	–		8	0
Konak Belediyespor	2020–21	First League Gr. D	2	0	0	0	–		2	0
Konak Belediyespor	2021–22	Super League Gr. B	20	0	0	0	–		20	0
Konak Belediyespor	Total		30	0	0	0	0	0	30	0
Galatasaray	2022–23	Super League	8	0	0	0	–		8	0
Career total			131	3	5	0	5	0	141	3

== Honours ==
Turkish Women's First League

Ataşehir Belediyespor
Winners (2): 2010–11, 2017–18

Konak Belediyespor
Winners (5): 2012–13, 2013–14, 2014–15, 2015–16, 2016–17

ALG Spor
Runners-up (1): 2018–19

Galatasaray
Winners (1): 2023–24
