= Florya Metin Oktay Facilities =

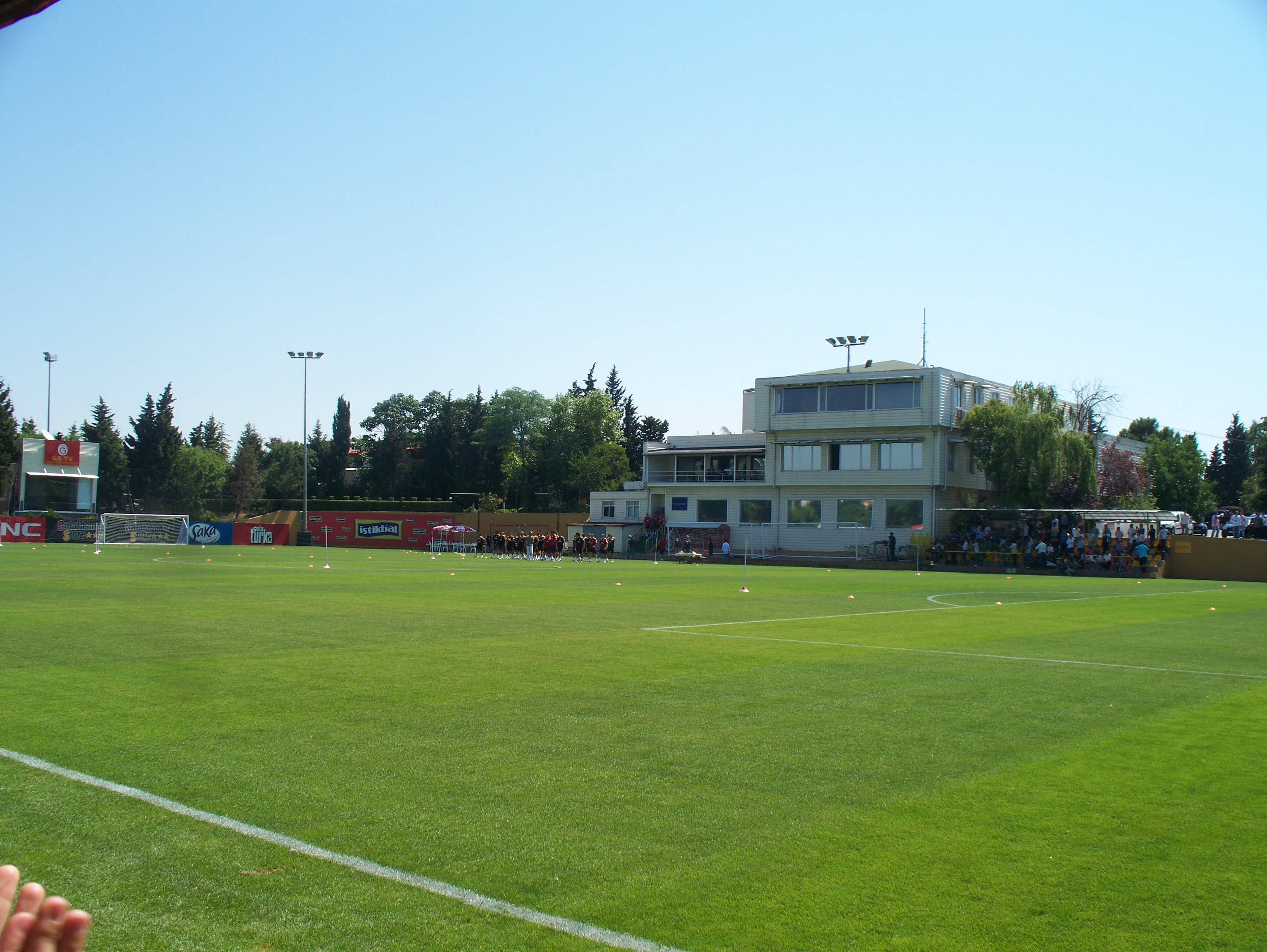
- Galatasaray SK's training complex
- Interactive map of Florya Metin Oktay Facilities
- Address: Şenlikköy, Germeyan Sk. No:106/88, 34153 Bakırköy/İstanbul
- Coordinates: 40°58′30″N 28°47′58″E
- Owner: Galatasaray SK
- Type: Football, Basketball, Volleyball Training Complex and academy

Construction
- Built: 1981
- Closed: 2025 (expected)
- Demolished: 2025 (expected)
- Cost: $80m

Website
- Official Webpage

Florya Metin Oktay Facilities (Turkish: Florya Metin Oktay Tesisleri), is the training ground and academy base of the Turkish football club Galatasaray SK. The Florya training camp land was bought during the presidency of Suphi Batur, built and opened during Professor Ali Uras presidency and was expanded and improved during both Ali Tanriyar and Alp Yalman presidencies. It was opened on August 1, 1981. Located in Florya, Istanbul and named after the club's legendary goalscorer Metin Oktay, the sports complex covers an area of 110,224 m^{2} (1,186,440 ft^{2}). It is used for first team and youth team training and matches, as well as by many of the other sports teams at the club, including those for basketball and volleyball. Facility is fully operational.

In 2025, the facilities are expected to move to the new training facilities in Kemerburgaz.

== List of Facilities ==
- Central administration building
- Camp building
- 4 full course grass pitches
- Junior team facility
- Indoor sports facility
- Galatasaray football school
- Galatasaray hospital
- Basketball facility
- Volleyball facility
- Restaurants
- Recreation Area

== See also ==
- Kemerburgaz Metin Oktay Training Facilities
