= Gamze Nur Yaman =

Turkish footballer (born 1999)

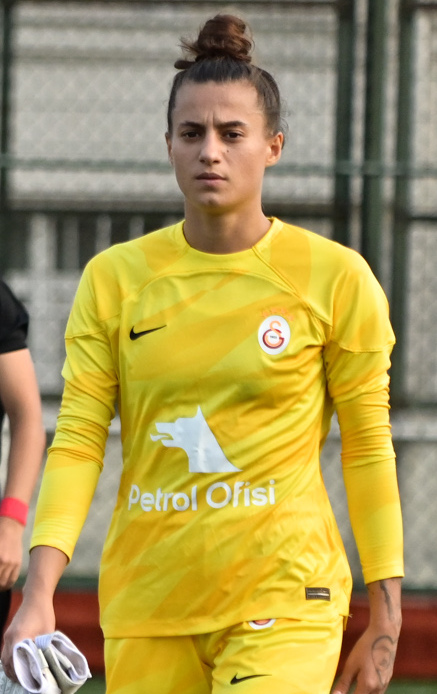
- Gamze Nur Yaman of Galatasaray in 2023

Personal information
- Date of birth: 25 April 1999 (age 27)
- Place of birth: Gaziosmanpaşa, Istanbul, Turkey
- Position: Goalkeeper

Team information
- Current team: Trabzonspor
- Number: 99

Senior career*
Years	Team	Apps	(Gls)
2014–2019	Beşiktaş	29	(0)
2019–2020	ALG	9	(1)
2020–2022	Zhytlobud-1	2	(0)
2022–2025	Galatasaray	52	(0)
2025–	Trabzon	3	(0)

International career^{‡}
2016–2018	Turkey U-19	19	(0)
2018–	Turkey	14	(0)
- * Club domestic league appearances and goals as of 5 October 2025 ‡ National team caps and goals as of 9 April 2024

Gamze Nur Yaman (born 25 April 1999) is a Turkish women's footballer who plays as a goalkeeper for Trabzon. She was a member of the Turkey women's national under-19 team before she was admitted to the Turkey women's national team.

== Early life ==
Gamze Nur Yaman was born in the Gaziosmanpaşa district of Istanbul Province, Turkey on April 25, 1999.

== Club career ==
=== Beşiktaş ===
Yaman obtained her license from Beşiktaş J.K. on May 30, 2015. Her debut came in the 2014–15 season of the Turkish Women's Third League. Becoming league champion, her team was promoted to the Turkish Second League in the 2015–16 season. Beşiktaş J.K. finished the season as champion, and was again promoted to the First League in the 2016–17 season.

She is the team's goalkeeper. İn the end of the 2018-19 First Leafue season, she enjoyed her team's champion title.

==== ALG ====
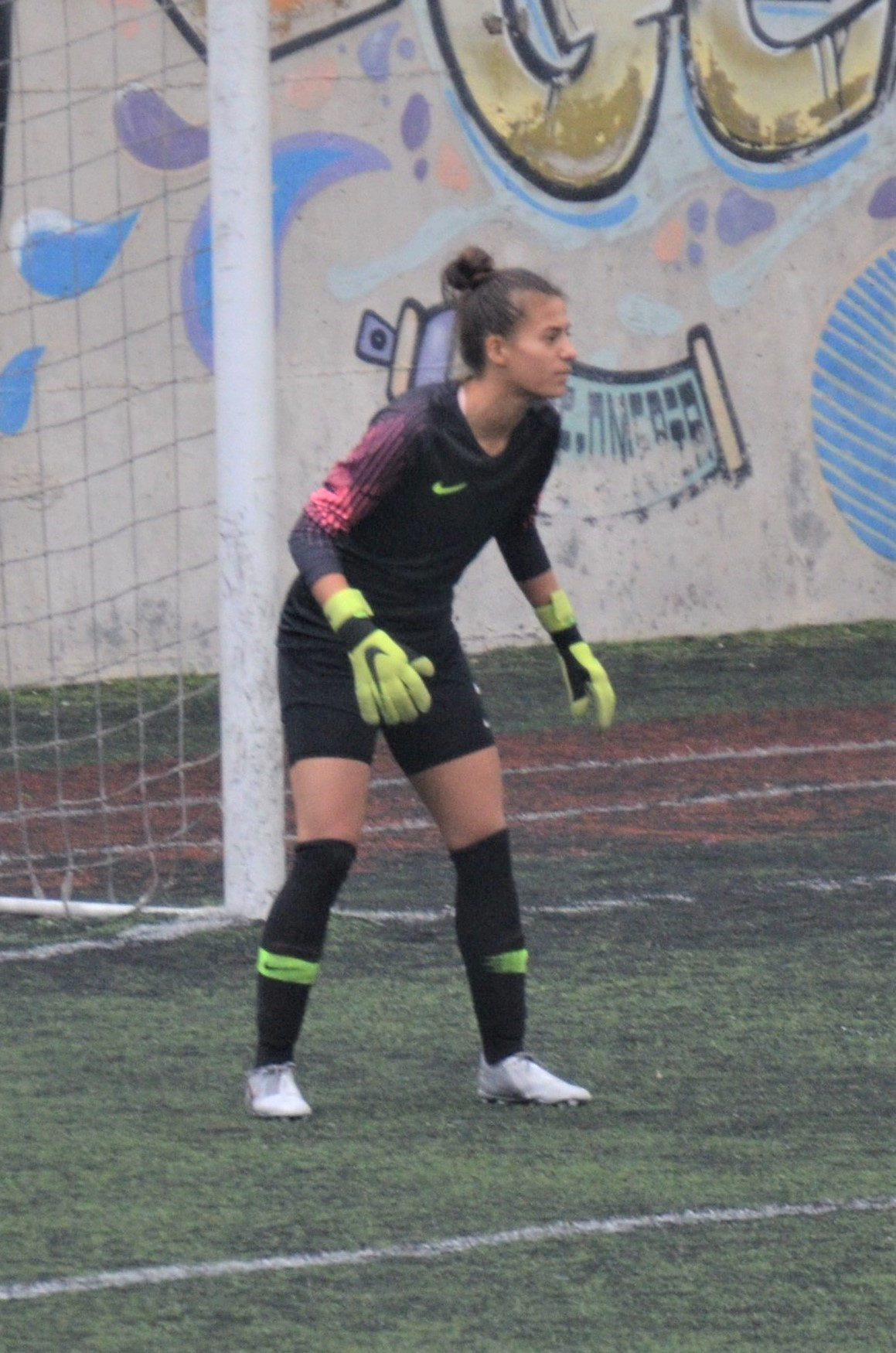
Yaman of ALG in the 2019–20 season.

By end September 2019, Yaman moved to ALG SporALG in Gaziantep.

=== Zhytlobud-1 Kharkiv ===
After two seasons with ALG, she went on 21 September 2020 to Ukraine to join WFC Zhytlobud-1 Kharkiv in the 2020–21 Vyshcha Liha.

=== Galatasaray ===
On 3 March 2022, the Turkish Women's Football Super League team transferred to Galatasaray. Her team finished the 2023-24 Super League season as champion. She played in the 2024–25 UEFA Champions League qualifying rounds and the knockout phase matches. In the statement made by Galatasaray club on 20 July 2025, the managementwished her farewell.

=== Trabzon ===
In September 2025, she transferred to Trabzon.

== International career ==
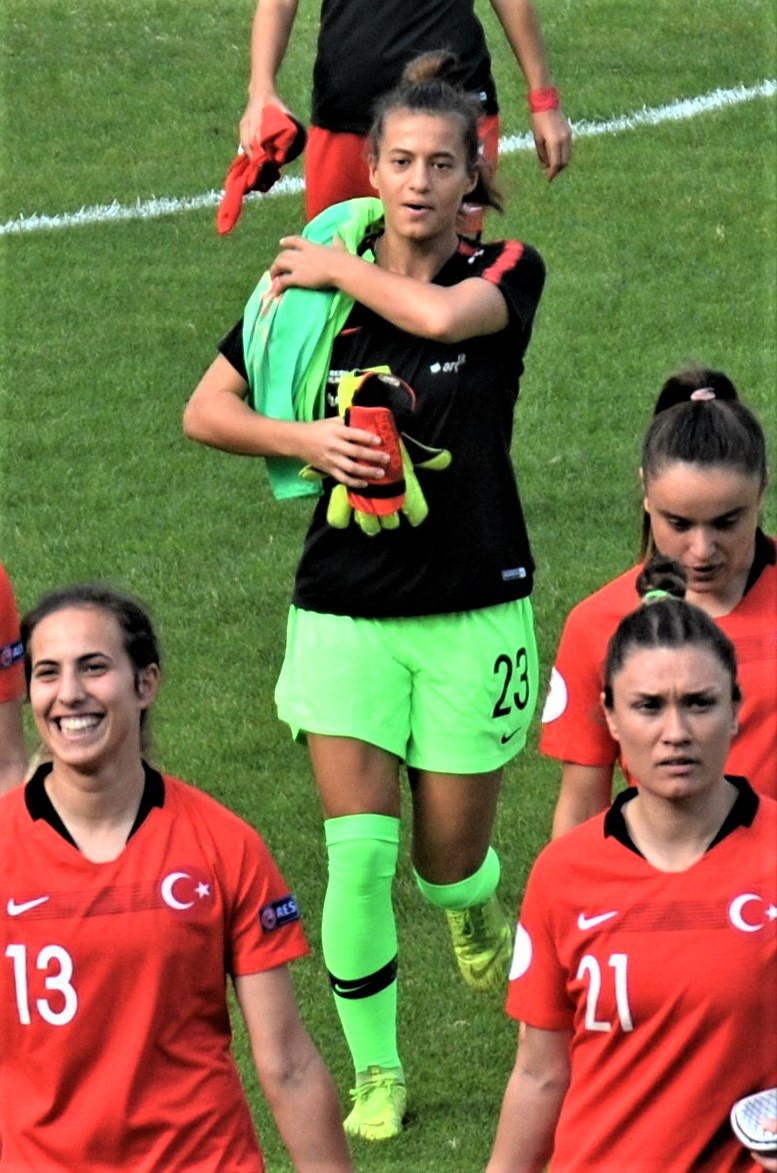
Gamze Nur Yaman (mid) of Turkey national team in 2019

Yaman was admitted to the Turkey women's U-19 team, and played her first game at the UEFA Development Tournament against Slovenia on June 9, 2016. The women's U-19 team became champion of the tournament.

She was called up to the national U-19 team again to play at the 2017 UEFA Women's Under-19 Championship qualification – Group 10 matches. She took part also in one match of the 2018 UEFA Women's Under-19 Championship qualification – Group 10, and three matches of the 2018 UEFA Women's Under-19 Championship qualification – Elite round Group 4.

On 11 November 2018, she debuted in the Turkey women's national football team playing in the friendly match against Georgia. She took part in three UEFA Women's Euro 2022 qualifying Group A matches.

== Career statistics ==
As of 5 October 2025.

Club	Season	League			Continental		National		Total	
Club	Season	Division	Apps	Goals	Apps	Goals	Apps	Goals	Apps	Goals
Beşiktaş	2014–15	Third League	4	0	–	–	0	0	4	0
Beşiktaş	2015–16	Second League	9	0	–	–	3	0	12	0
Beşiktaş	2016–17	First League|2019–20 ||First League	3	0	–	–	5	0	8	0
Beşiktaş	2017–18	First League	7	0	–	–	11	0	18	0
Beşiktaş	2018–19	First League	6	0	–	–	1	0	7	0
Total			29	0	–	–	20	0	49	0
ALG	9	1	–	–	1	0	10	0		
ALG	2020–21	First League	0	0	–	–	1	0	1	0
ALG	Total		9	1	–	–	2	0	11	1
Zhytlobud-1	2020–21	Ukrainian Women's League	2	0	–	–	3	0	5	0
Galatasaray	2021–22	Super League	5	0	–	–	2	0	7	0
Galatasaray	2022–23	Super League	7	0	–	–	2	0	9	0
Galatasaray	2023–24	Super League	20	0	–	–	4	0	24	0
Galatasaray	2024–25	Super League	20	0	10	0	0	30	0	
Galatasaray	Total		52	0	10	0	8	0	70	0
Trabzon	2025–26	Super League	3	0	0	0	0	0	3	0
Career total			95	1	10	0	33	0	138	1

== Honours ==
=== Club ===
Turkish Super League

Galatasaray
Winners (1): 2023–24

Turkish First League

Beşiktaş
Winners (1): 2018–19
Runners-up (2): 2016–17, 2017–18

Turkish Second League

Beşiktaş
Winners (1): 2015–16

Turkish Third League

Beşiktaş
Winners (1): 2014–15

=== International ===
UEFA Development Tournament

Yurkey U-
Winners (1): 2016
