= Elena Gracinda Santos =

American soccer player (born 1997)

Elena Santos
Personal information
- Full name: Elena Gracinda Santos
- Date of birth: February 6, 1997 (age 29)
- Place of birth: Johannesburg, South Africa
- Height: 1.70 m (5 ft 7 in)
- Position: Forward

Youth career
- Conard High School

College career
Years	Team	Apps	(Gls)
2015–2016	Fairfield Stags	31	(6)
2017–2018	UConn Huskies	35	(5)

Senior career*
Years	Team	Apps	(Gls)
- NJ/NY Gotham FC Reserves
2022–2023	Galatasaray	29	(11)
2023	Fatih Karagümrük	3	(0)
2023–2025	Beylerbeyi	44	(19)
2025–2026	Fenerbahçe	12	(3)
- * Club domestic league appearances and goals as of 10:26, 20 May 2026 (UTC)

Elena Gracinda Santos (born February 6, 1997) is a South Africa-born American professional women's soccer forward.

== Personal life and early years ==
Elena Gracinda Santos was born in a Cape Verde-descent family to Mario Santos and Lisa Audet in Johannesburg, South Africa on 6 February 1997. She has two brothers Luis and Mario. She went to the United States, and later received United States citizenship.

In the United States, she went to Conard High School, where she played soccer and captained the school squad. Playing in the forward/midfielder position, she was the top goalscorer and held the school record for goals. She was a top player in the division, and was also picked as one of the best players in the state. She was named to All-CCC West team. She received a four-star ranking from the academy soccer website TopDrawerSoccer.com, and 150 national ranking from the sports management company IMG.

After finishing the high school, she attended Fairfield University in 2015. She played two seasons for the college team Fairfield Stags, and scored six goals in 31 matches.

In 2017, Santos entered University of Connecticut (UConn) to major in Communication studies. There, she played in the college team UConn Huskies. She netted five goals in 35 games played in 2017 and 2018. She played also at the post-season college football all-star game Senior Bowl of the New England Women's Intercollegiate Sailing Association (NEWISA) in 2018.

The 1.70 metres (5 ft 7 in) tall Santos kicks with right foot and plays in the wing attacker position.

== Club career ==
=== NJ/NY Gotham FC ===
Santos played for NJ/NY Gotham FC Reserves in the Women's Premier Soccer League of the United States.

=== Galatasaray ===
In March 2022, she moved to Turkey, and joined the newly established club Galatasaray S.K. in Istanbul to play in the Women's Super League.

=== Fatih Karagümrük, Beylerbeyi ===
End August 2023, she transferred to Fatih Karagümrük S.K. One month later, she moved to Beylerbeyi, which play for the first time in the Super League
