= Metin Ülgen =

Turkish footballer and manager

Personal information
- Date of birth: 7 July 1959 (age 67)
- Place of birth: Erzincan, Turkey
- Position: Defender

Senior career*
Years	Team	Apps	(Gls)
–	Yedikule		
–	Süleymaniye Sirkecispor		
–	Silivrispor		
–	Erzincanspor		

Managerial career
- 1996: Nişantaşıspor
- 1996–1997: Beylerbeyi Spor Kulübü
- 1998: Vefaspor
- 2007–2008: Esenkent İdman Yurdu
- 2008–2009: Beyoğlu 1979 Yeniçarşı GSK
- 2009: Avcılar Spor Kulübü
- 2011–2012: Galatasaray U17
- 2016–2017: Galatasaray U11
- 2017–2018: Galatasaray U21
- 2018: Galatasaray U10
- 2018–2019: Galatasaray U13
- 2019: Galatasaray U19
- 2019–2020: Galatasaray U16
- 2022: Galatasaray U11
- 2022–2025: Galatasaray Petrol Ofisi
- * Club domestic league appearances and goals

Metin Ülgen (born 7 July 1959) is a Turkish football manager and former player. He is the current head coach of Galatasaray Petrol Ofisi.

== Managerial career ==
It was announced that he was appointed as the Technical Director of Galatasaray Women's Football Team on 11 August 2022.

July 5, 2025, Galatasaray thanked coach Ülgen and announced that they had parted ways.
