= Kristina Bakarandze =

Georgian-born Azerbaijani footballer (born 1998)

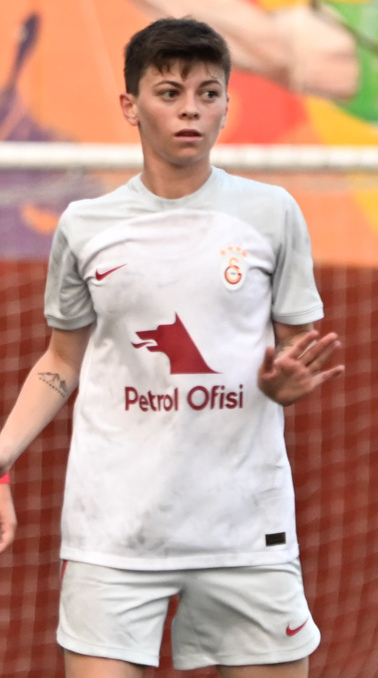
- Kristina Bakarandze of Galatasaray (September 2023)

Personal information
- Date of birth: 19 May 1998 (age 28)
- Place of birth: Georgia
- Position: Midfielder

Senior career*
Years	Team	Apps	(Gls)
2013–2015	FK Zaqatala		
2015–2016	Neftçi PFK		
2016–2017	FK Zaqatala		
2017–2018	FC Okzhetpes		
2018–2020	Hakkarigücü Spor	27	(5)
2021–2022	ALG Spor	26	(6)
2022–2025	Galatasaray	64	(7)

International career^{‡}
2013–2015	Azerbaijan U-17	13	(2)
2015–2017	Azerbaijan U-19	11	(2)
2015	Azerbaijan U-21	2	(0)
2019–	Azerbaijan	25	(3)
- * Club domestic league appearances and goals as of 1 December 2023 ‡ National team caps and goals as of 1 December 2023

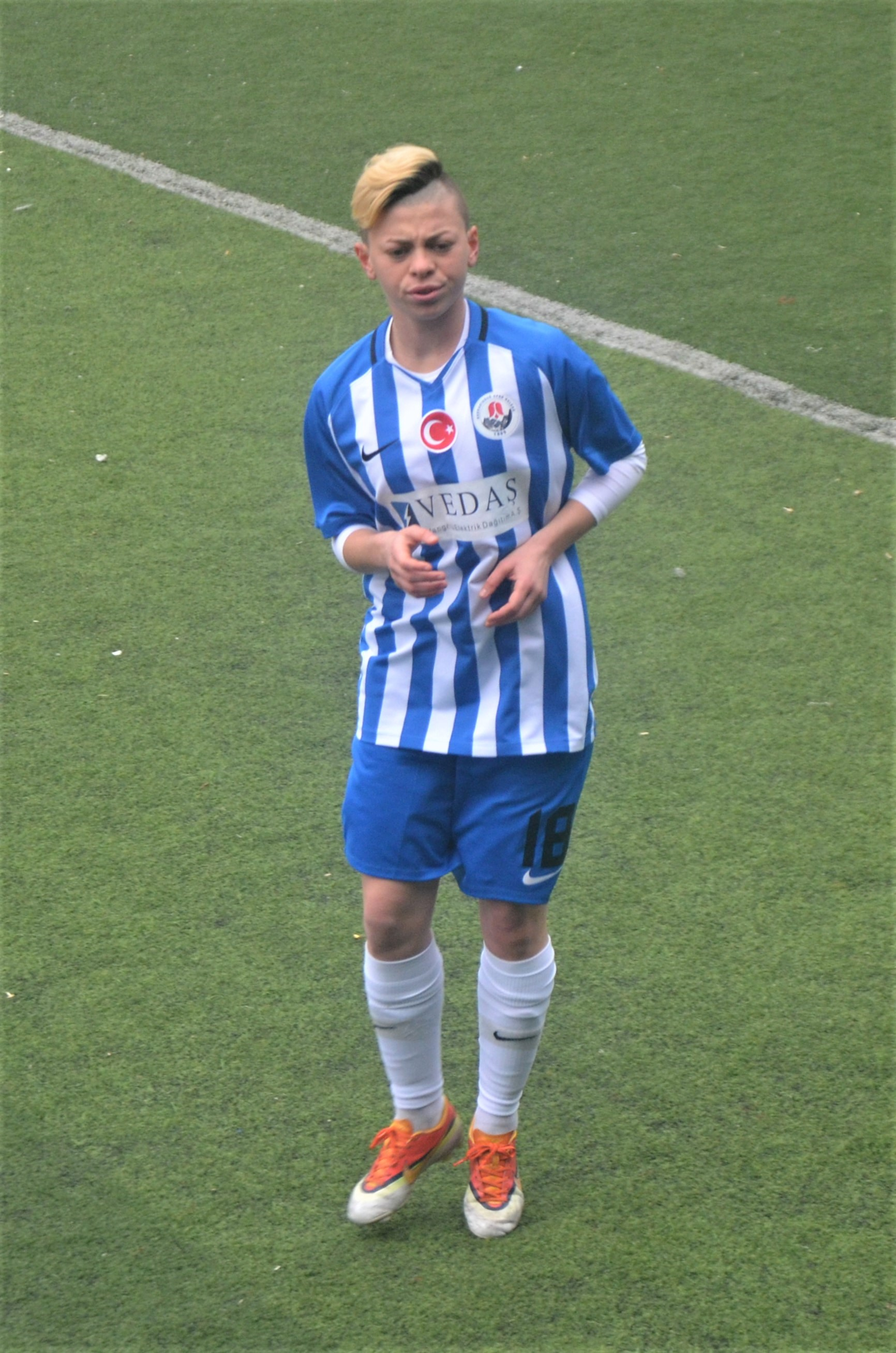
Kristina Bakarandze of Hakkarigücü Spor (December 2018)

Kristina Bakarandze (Georgian: კრისტინა ბაკარანძე, born 19 May 1998) is a footballer, who plays as a midfielder for Turkish Women's Super League club Galatasaray. Born in Georgia, she is a member of the Azerbaijan women's national team.

== Personal life ==
Kristina Bakarandze was born in Georgia. She studied economics at Shota Meskhia Zugdidi State University (ZSU) in Zugdidi.

== Club career ==
Bakarandze moved to Azerbaijan and was a member of the FK Zaqatala team from 2013 to 2015. For the 2015–16 season, she moved to the Baku-based club Neftçi PFK. She then returned to her previous club FK Zaqatala, where she played in 2016 and 2017.

In July 2017, she signed a contract for six months with the Kazakhstani team FC Okzhetpes.

=== Hakkarigücü Spor ===
She joined Hakkarigücü Spor in southeastern Turkey on 18 October 2018 to play in the Turkish Women's First Football League.

=== ALG Spor ===
Bakaradze transferred to the Gaziantep-based club ALG Spor end October 2021. She enjoyed the 2021-22 Women's Super League champion title of her team.

=== Galatasaray ===
On 13 September 2022, the Turkish Women's Football Super League team was transferred to the Galatasaray club.

In the statement made by Galatasaray club on July 20, 2025, it was said that we thank you for your efforts and wish you success in your future careers.

== International career ==
Bakarandze became part of the Azerbaijan women's national under-17 football team, and debuted in the match against Austria of the 2014 UEFA Women's Under-17 Championship qualification – Group 8 on 2 August 2013. She appeared in two matches of the 2015 UEFA Women's Under-17 Championship qualification – Group 3. She scored one goal in the 2015 UEFA Development Tournament held in Shymkent, Kazakhstan. She capped in total 13 times and scored two goals for the national U-17 team.

She then became a member of the Azerbaijan women's national under-19 football team. She participated in the 2015 Baltic Women's U-19 Cup. She played in three matches of the 2016 UEFA Women's Under-19 Championship qualification – Group 3, in two matches of the 2016 UEFA Women's Under-19 Championship qualification – Elite round, and in three matches of the 2017 UEFA Women's Under-19 Championship qualification – Group 8. She scored two goals for the national U-19 team.

She was selected to the Azerbaijan women's national under-21 football team for two friendly matches in 2015.

In June 2017, she was called up to the training camp of the Azerbaijan women's national football team.

== Career statistics ==
=== Club ===
As of match played 117 December 2022.

Club	Season	League			Continental		National		Total	
Club	Season	Division	Apps	Goals	Apps	Goals	Apps	Goals	Apps	Goals
Neftçi PFK, FK Zaqatala	2013–17				–	–	24	4	24	4
Neftçi PFK, FK Zaqatala	Total				–	–	24	4	24	4
FC Okzhetpes	2017–18				–	–				
FC Okzhetpes	Total				–	–				
Hakkarigücü Spor	2018–19	First League	16	2	–	–	-	-	16	2
Hakkarigücü Spor	2019–20	First League	11	3	–	–	-	-	11	3
Hakkarigücü Spor	Total		27	5	–	–	-	-	27	5
ALG Spor	2021–22	Super League	26	6	–	–	0	0	26	6
ALG Spor	Total		26	6	–	–	0	0	26	6
Galatasaray	2022–23	Super League	9	1	–	–	0	0	9	1
Galatasaray	Total		9	1	–	–	0	0	9	1

=== International ===
No.	Date	Venue	Opponent	Score	Result	Competition
1.	20 February 2022	Dalga Arena, Baku, Azerbaijan	United Arab Emirates	4–0	4–0	Friendly
2.	28 June 2022	TFF Riva Facility, Riva, Turkey	Turkey	2–1	2–2	Friendly
3.	2 September 2022	Centenary Stadium, Ta'Qali, Malta	Malta	1–0	2–0	2023 FIFA Women's World Cup qualification
4.	27 October 2023	Við Djúpumýrar, Klaksvík, Faroe Islands	Faroe Islands	1–0	2–1	2023–24 UEFA Women's Nations League
5.	9 June 2026	Petar Miloševski Football Stadium, Bitola, North Macedonia	North Macedonia	1–0	3–1	2027 FIFA Women's World Cup qualification

== Honours ==
Turkish Women's Super League

ALG Spor
Winners (1): 2021-22
