= Emine Ecem Esen =

Turkish footballer (born 1994)

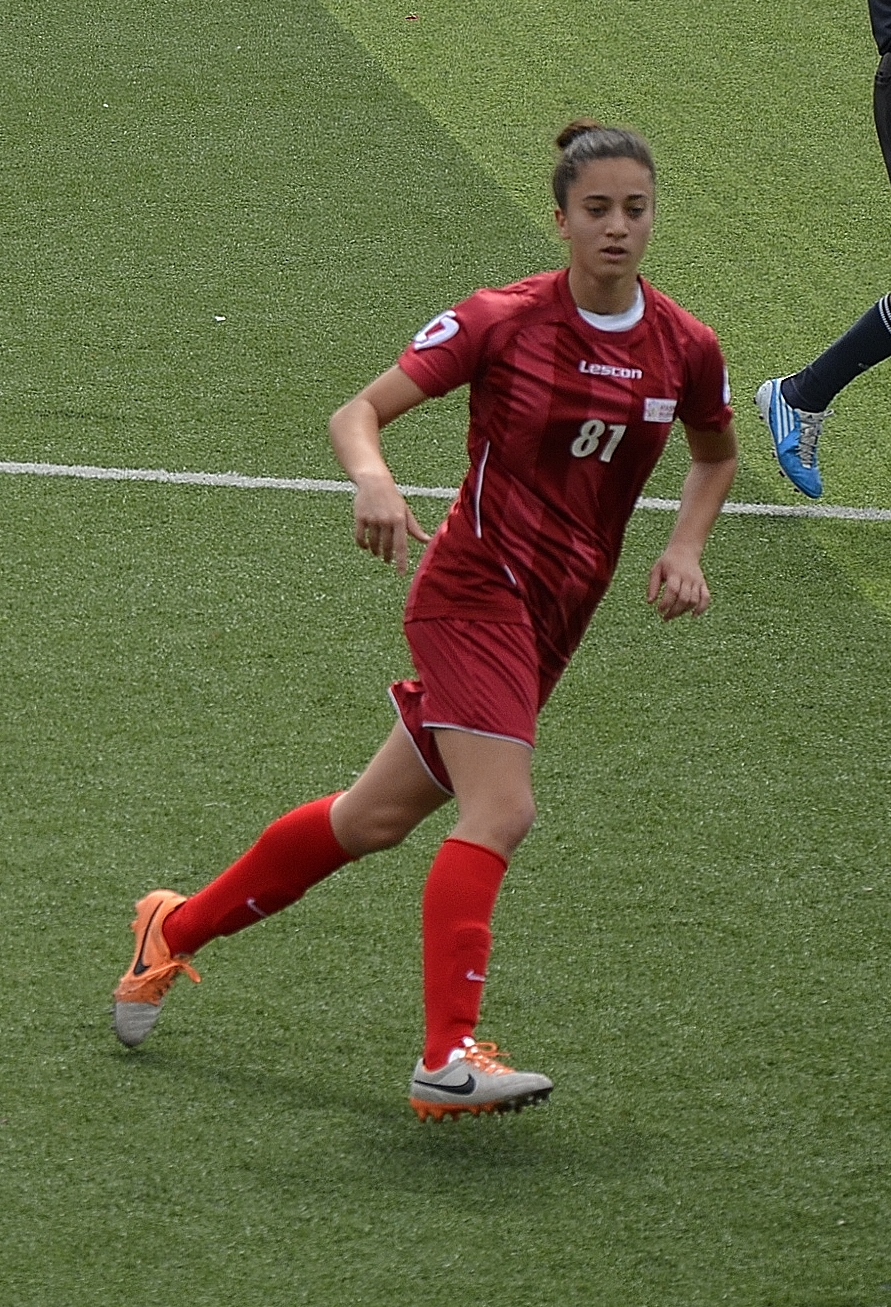
- Emine Ecem Esen for Ataşehir Belediyespor in the 2013–14 season

Personal information
- Date of birth: May 3, 1994 (age 32)
- Place of birth: Güngören, Istanbul, Turkey
- Position: Midfielder

Team information
- Current team: Fomget Gençlik ve Spor

Senior career*
Years	Team	Apps	(Gls)
2009–2010	Hasköy		
2010–2013	Çamlıcaspor	59	(13)
2013	Marmara Üniversitesi Spor	6	(1)
2014–2015	Ataşehir Belediyespor	24	(2)
2015–2019	Beşiktaş J.K.	71	(19)
2019–2022	ALG Spor	46	(9)
2022–2025	Galatasaray	56	(5)
2025–	Fomget Gençlik ve Spor	0	(0)

International career^{‡}
2011–2012	Turkey U-19	20	(0)
2014	Turkey U-21	1	(0)
2013–	Turkey	24	(1)
- * Club domestic league appearances and goals as of 23 January 2023 ‡ National team caps and goals as of 12 November 2022

Emine Ecem Esen (born May 3, 1994) is a Turkish women's footballer who plays as a midfielder in the First League for Fomget Gençlik ve Spor. She has been a member of the Turkish national team since 2011.

== Early life ==
Emine Ecem Esen was born on May 3, 1994, in Güngören district of Istanbul. She followed the footsteps of her maternal cousin, who is a footballer. She remembers that the main theme in her home was about football. With the encouragement of her aunt, she began playing football and got registered in the nearby club Hasköy, which had recently established a women's football team.

== Club career ==
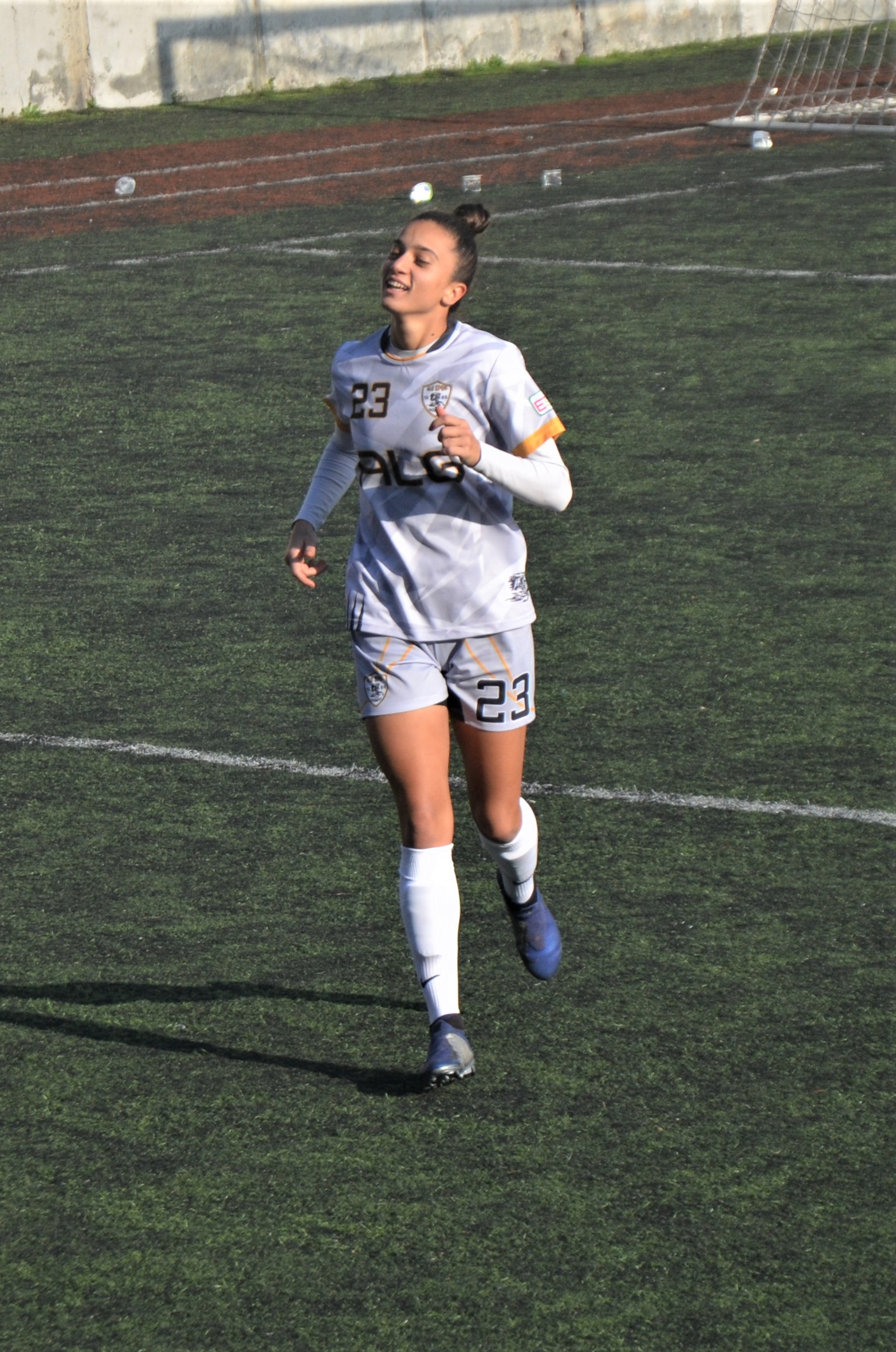
Emine Ecem Esen of ALG Spor in the 2019-20 Women's First League season

She received her license on June 17, 2009, for the Women's Regional League team Hasköy, where she played one season. In the 2010–11 season, she moved to Çamlıcaspor playing in the Women's First League. After three seasons, Esen signed for Marmara Üniversitesi Spor starting in the 2013–14 season.

On January 10, 2014, Esen was transferred by the Istanbul-based club Ataşehir Belediyespor. After one season, she left Ataşehir Belediyespor to play for Beşiktaş J.K. in the Women's Second League. She enjoyed the champion title of her team in the 2018–19 season. She took part at the 2019–20 UEFA Women's Champions League - Group 9 matches.

=== ALG Spor ===
In the 2019-20 Women's First League season, she transferred to the Gaziantep-based club ALG Spor. She enjoyed the 2021-22 Women's Super League champion title of her team.

=== Galatasaray ===
On 9 August 2022, she transferred to the Women's Super League club Galatasaray.

In the statement made by Galatasaray club on July 20, 2025, it was said that we thank you for your efforts and wish you success in your future careers.

== International career ==
Esen debuted in the Turkey women's national team in the Kuban Spring Tournament qualification match against Belarus on March 8, 2011.

She was member of the women's U-19 national team and capped 20 times in total playing against Iceland and Germany at the 2011 UEFA Women's U-19 Championship Second qualifying round Group 3, against Portugal, at the 2012 UEFA Women's U-19 Championship – Final tournament Group A and finally against Scotland and Belarus at the 2013 UEFA Women's U-19 Championship First qualifying round Group 5 matches.

Esen played at the 2015 FIFA Women's World Cup qualification – UEFA Group 6 matches against England, Ukraine and Belarus.

== Career statistics ==
As of match played 17 December 2022.

Club	Season	League			Continental		National		Total	
Club	Season	Division	Apps	Goals	Apps	Goals	Apps	Goals	Apps	Goals
Çamlıcaspor	2010–11	First League	22	6	–	–	6	0	28	6
Çamlıcaspor	2011–12	First League	20	4	–	–	9	0	29	4
Çamlıcaspor	2012–13	First League	17	3	–	–	5	0	22	3
Çamlıcaspor	Total		59	13	–	–	20	0	79	13
Marmara Üniversitesi Spor	2013–14	First League	6	1	–	–	0	0	6	1
Marmara Üniversitesi Spor	Total		6	1	–	–	0	0	6	1
Ataşehir Belediyespor	2013–14	First League	9	1	–	–	5	0	14	1
Ataşehir Belediyespor	2014–15	First League	15	1	–	–	5	0	20	1
Ataşehir Belediyespor	Total		24	2	–	–	10	0	34	2
Beşiktaş J.K.	2015–16	Second League	18	11	–	–	3	0	21	11
Beşiktaş J.K.	2016–17	First League	20	1	–	–	0	0	20	1
Beşiktaş J.K.	2017–18	First League	18	5	–	–	0	0	18	5
Beşiktaş J.K.	2018–19	First League	15	2	-	-	0	0	15	2
Beşiktaş J.K.	2019–20	First League	0	0	2	0	0	0	2	0
Beşiktaş J.K.	Total		71	19	2	0	3	0	76	19
ALG Spor	2019–20	First League	15	4	–	–	1	0	16	4
ALG Spor	2020–21	First League	6	1	–	–	6	0	12	1
ALG Spor	2021–22	Super League	25	4	–	–	12	0	37	4
ALG Spor	Total		46	9	-	-	19	0	65	9
Galatasaray S.K	2022–23	SuperLeague	9	2	–	–	3	1	12	3
Galatasaray S.K	Total		9	2	-	-	3	1	12	3
Career total			215	46	2	0	55	1	272	47

== International goals ==
No.	Date	Venue	Opponent	Score	Result	Competition
1.	14 July 2023	Kadriorg Stadium, Tallinn, Estonia	Estonia	2–0	3–0	Friendly

== Honours ==
Turkish Women's First League

Ataşehir Belediyespor
Runners-up (2): 2013–14, 2014–15

Beşiktaş J.K.
Winners (1): 2018–19
Runners-up (2): 2016–17, 2017–18

ALG Spor
Winners (2): 2019-20, 2021-22
Third places (1): 2020–21

Galatasaray
Winners (1): 2023–24

Turkish Women's Second League

Beşiktaş J.K.
Winners (1): 2015–16
