= Berna Yeniçeri =

Turkish footballer (born 1996)

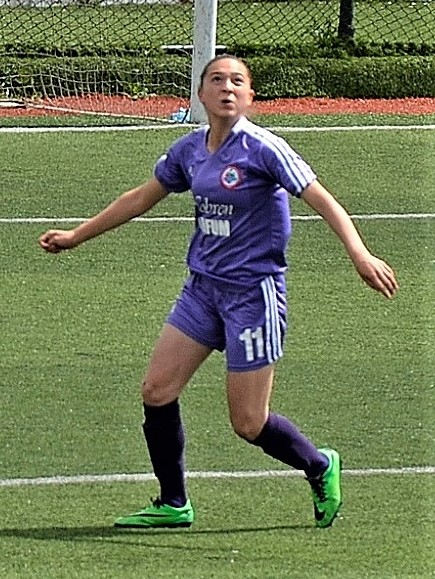
- Berna Yeniçeri for Kdz. Ereğlispor in the 2013–14 season

Personal information
- Date of birth: January 26, 1996 (age 30)
- Place of birth: Karadeniz Ereğli, Zonguldak, Turkey
- Position: Defender

Team information
- Current team: Trabzonspor
- Number: 2

Senior career*
Years	Team	Apps	(Gls)
2006–2014	Kdz. Ereğli	105	(9)
2014–2017	Konak	50	(3)
2017–2018	Ataşehir	16	(2)
2018–2021	Konak	29	(4)
2021–2022	Beşiktaş	28	(5)
2022–2025	Galatasaray	63	(6)
2025–	Trabzon	3	(0)

International career^{‡}
2012–2013	Turkey U-17	7	(0)
2012–2015	Turkey U-19	36	(1)
2014	Turkey U-21	1	(0)
2014–	Turkey	40	(0)
- * Club domestic league appearances and goals as of 11 October 2025 ‡ National team caps and goals as of 17 July 2023

Berna Yeniçeri (born January 26, 1996) is a Turkish women's football defender, who plays in the Super League for Trabzon. She has been a member of the Turkish national team since 2011.

== Club career ==
=== Kdz. Ereğli ===
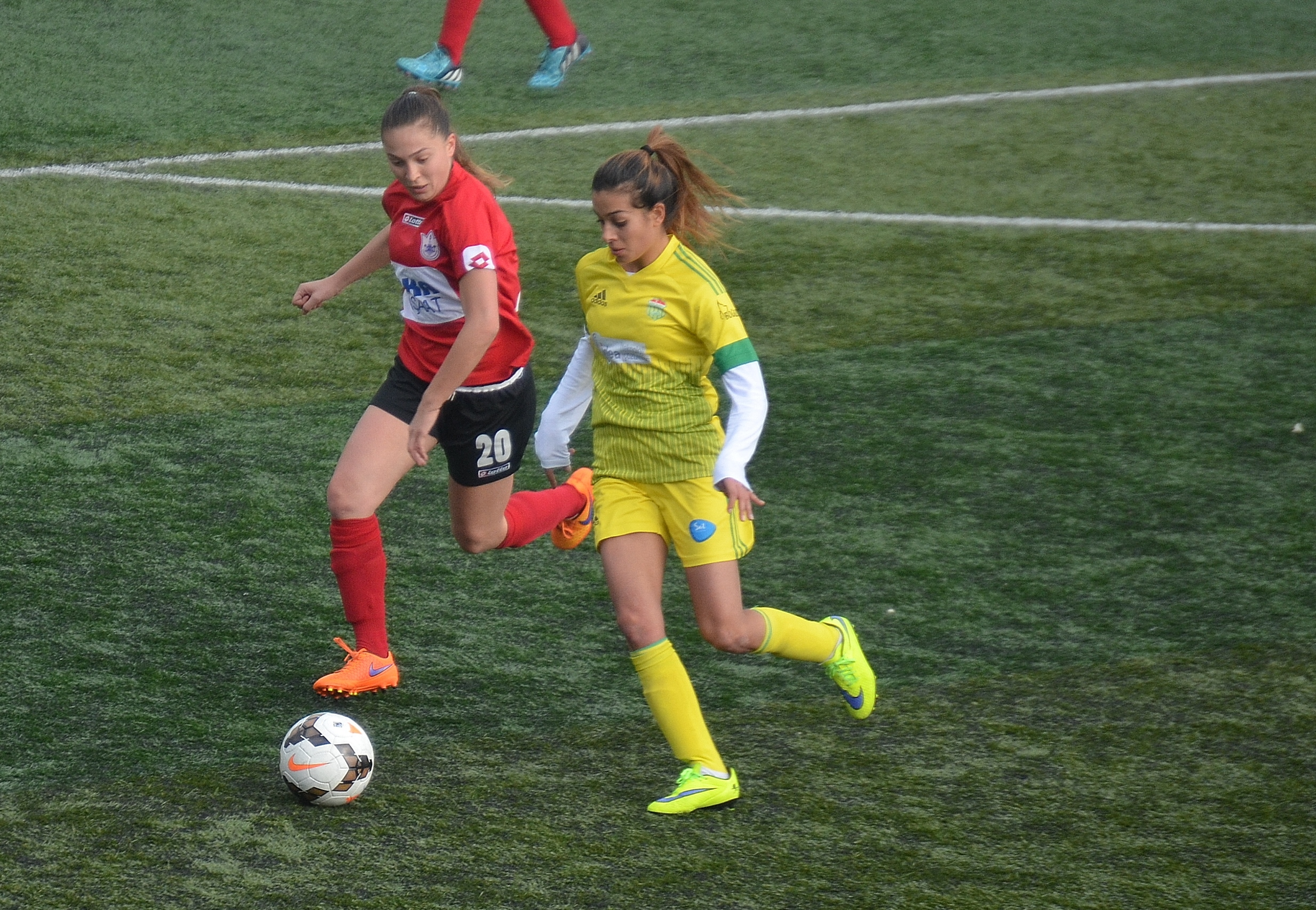
Berna Yeniçeri (left) playing for Konak against Kireçburnu in the 2015–16 season's away match

Yeniçeri made her professional debut on November 9, 2006, for her hometown club, Kdz. Ereğlispor. She helped them gain promotion to the Women's First League at the end of 2010–11 season.

=== Konak ===
After playing six seasons for Kdz. Ereğlispor, she transferred to the İzmir-based league-champions Konak on July 25, 2014. With her new team, she took part at the 2014–15 UEFA Women's Champions League qualifying round matches. She played in three matches of the 2015–16 UEFA Women's Champions League qualifying round, and scored one goal.

At the end of the 2015–16 season, Konak won the Turkish Women's Football Super League. Yeniçeri played in three matches of the Group 9 of the 2016–17 UEFA Women's Champions League qualifying round.

=== Ataşehir ===
By mid-August 2017, she had transferred to the Istanbul-based rival Ataşehir after three seasons with Konak Belediyespor.

=== Konak (return) ===
In the 2018–19 First League season, she returned to her former club Konak.

=== Beşiktaş ===
By mid April, right before the 2020-21 Turkcell Women's Football League season started, she joined Beşiktaş J.K. in Istanbul, and helped them to win the league in that season.

=== Galatasaray ===
On August 9, 2022, she was transferred to the Galatasaray club. In the statement made by Galatasaray club on 20 July 2025, the management wished her farewell.

=== Trabzon ===
In September 2025, she transferred to Trabzon.

== International career ==
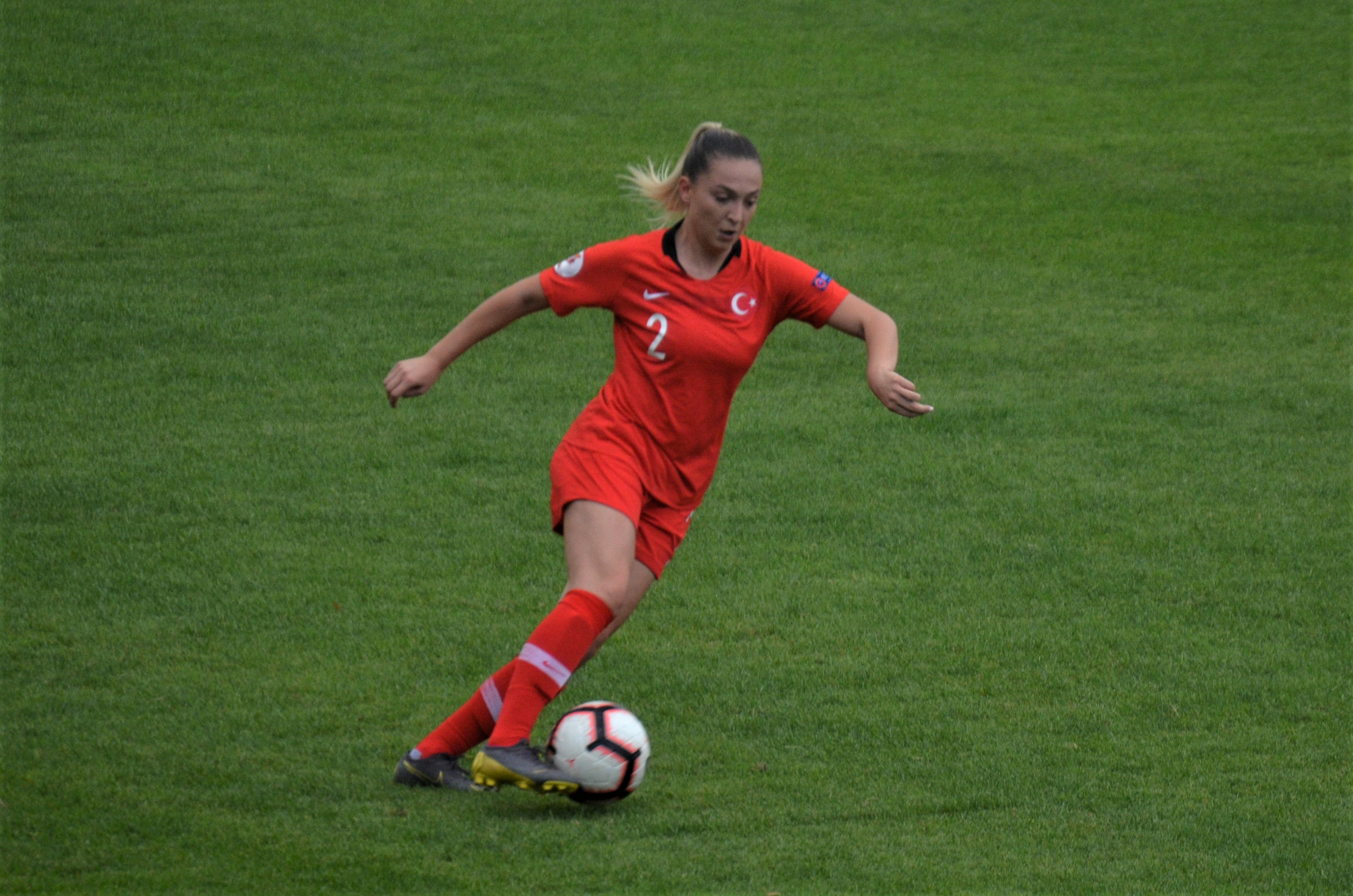
Berna Yeniçeri of Turkey national team (October 2019)

Yeniçeri made her first Turkey girls' U-17 national team appearance in the 2013 UEFA Women's Under-17 Championship qualification – Group 10 match against Wales on August 28, 2012. She played also against Norway and Latvia at the same competition. Yeniçeri was capped seven times for the Turkish U-17 national team.

At the 2014 UEFA Women's Under-19 Championship First qualifying round – Group 10 match against Belgium on September 21, 2013, she made her entrance into the Turkey women's U-19 national team.

Her debut in the Turkey women's national team took place in the 2015 FIFA Women's World Cup qualification – UEFA Group 6 match against Wales on June 14, 2014.

== Career statistics ==
As of 11 October 2025.

Club	Season	League			Continental		National		Total	
Club	Season	Division	Apps	Goals	Apps	Goals	Apps	Goals	Apps	Goals
Kdz. Ereğli	2008–09	Second League	8	0	–	–	-	-	8	0
Kdz. Ereğli	2009–10	Second League	18	1	–	–	-	0 -	18	1
Kdz. Ereğli	2010–11	Second League	23	5	–	–	-	-	23	5
Kdz. Ereğli	2011–12	First League	22	2	–	–	-	-	22	2
Kdz. Ereğli	2012–13	First League	17	1	–	–	16	0	33	1
Kdz. Ereğli	2013–14	First League	17	0	–	–	13	1	30	1
Kdz. Ereğli	Total		105	9	–	–	29	1	134	10
Konak	2014–15	First League	16	1	3	0	14	0	33	1
Konak	2015–16	First League	14	2	3	1	7	0	24	3
Konak	2016–17	First League	20	0	3	0	4	0	27	0
Konak	Total		50	3	9	1	25	0	84	4
Ataşehir	2017–18	First League	16	2	0	0	2	0	18	2
Ataşehir	Total		16	2	0	0	2	0	18	2
Konak	2018–19	First League	16	1	0	0	5	0	21	1
Konak	2019–20	First League	13	3	0	0	6	0	19	3
Konak	2020–21	First League	-	-	-	-	5	0	5	0
Konak	Total		29	4	0	0	16	0	45	4
Beşiktaş	2020–21	Women's League	6	1	0	0	0	0	6	1
Beşiktaş	2021–22	Super League	22	4	0	0	9	0	31	4
Beşiktaş	Total		28	5	0	0	9	0	37	5
Galatasaray	2022–23	Super League	21	4	0	0	2	0	23	4
Galatasaray	2023–24	Super League	28	2	0	0	1	0	29	2
Galatasaray	2024–25	Super League	14	0	6	0	0	0	20	0
Galatasaray	Total		63	6	6	0	3	0	72	6
Trabzon	2025–26	Super League	3	0	0	0	0	0	3	0
Career total			294	29	15	1	84	1	393	31

International goals
Date	Venue	Opponent	Competition	Result	Scored
Konak Beledyespor
August 13, 2015	Stadion Otoka, Sarajevo, Bosnia and Herzegovina	(Albania) KF Vllaznia Shkodër	2015–16 UEFA Women's Champions League qualifying round	W 5–1	1

== Honours ==
Turkish Women's First Football League

Kdz. Ereğlispor
Third places (2): 2011–12, 2012–13

Konak Belediyespor
Winners (3): 2014–15, 2015–16, 2016–17
Third places (1): 2018–19

Ataşehir Belediyespor
Winners (3): 2017–18

Beşiktaş J.K.
Winners (1): 2020-21

Galatasaray
Winners (1): 2023–24
