= Gamze =

Gamze (pronounced [ɡaɾmze]) is a female Turkish given name. It is derived from the Arabic word, ġamza (غَمْزَة), meaning winking but common female name in Turkey. In Turkish, it denotes the dimple on the cheek of a person when they smile; it is considered as a feature of beauty.

== People with the name ==
- Gamze Alikaya (born 1993), Turkish volleyball player
- Gamze Altun (born 2003), Turkish weightlifter
- Gamze Bezan (born 1994), Turkish footballer
- Gamze Bulut (born 1992), Turkish middle-distance runner
- Gamze Cizreli (born 1968), Turkish entrepreneur and businesswomen
- Gamze Durmuş (born 1994), Turkish football referee
- Gamze Gürdal (born 1995), Turkish Para Taekwondo practitioner
- Gamze İskeçeli (born 1983), Turkish footballer
- Gamze Özçelik (born 1982), Turkish actress
- Gamze Taşcıer (born 1982), Turkish pharmacist and politician
- Gamze Tazim (born 1989), Turkish-Dutch actress
- Gamze Nur Yaman (born 1999), Turkish women's footballer
- Deniz Gamze Ergüven (born 1978), Turkish-French director/writer
- Zeynep Gamze Koçer (born 1998), Turkish footballer

== Fictional characters with the name ==
- Gamzee Makara, character from the webcomic Homestuck
