= Tamari Tatuashvili =

Georgian women's football defender (born 1991)

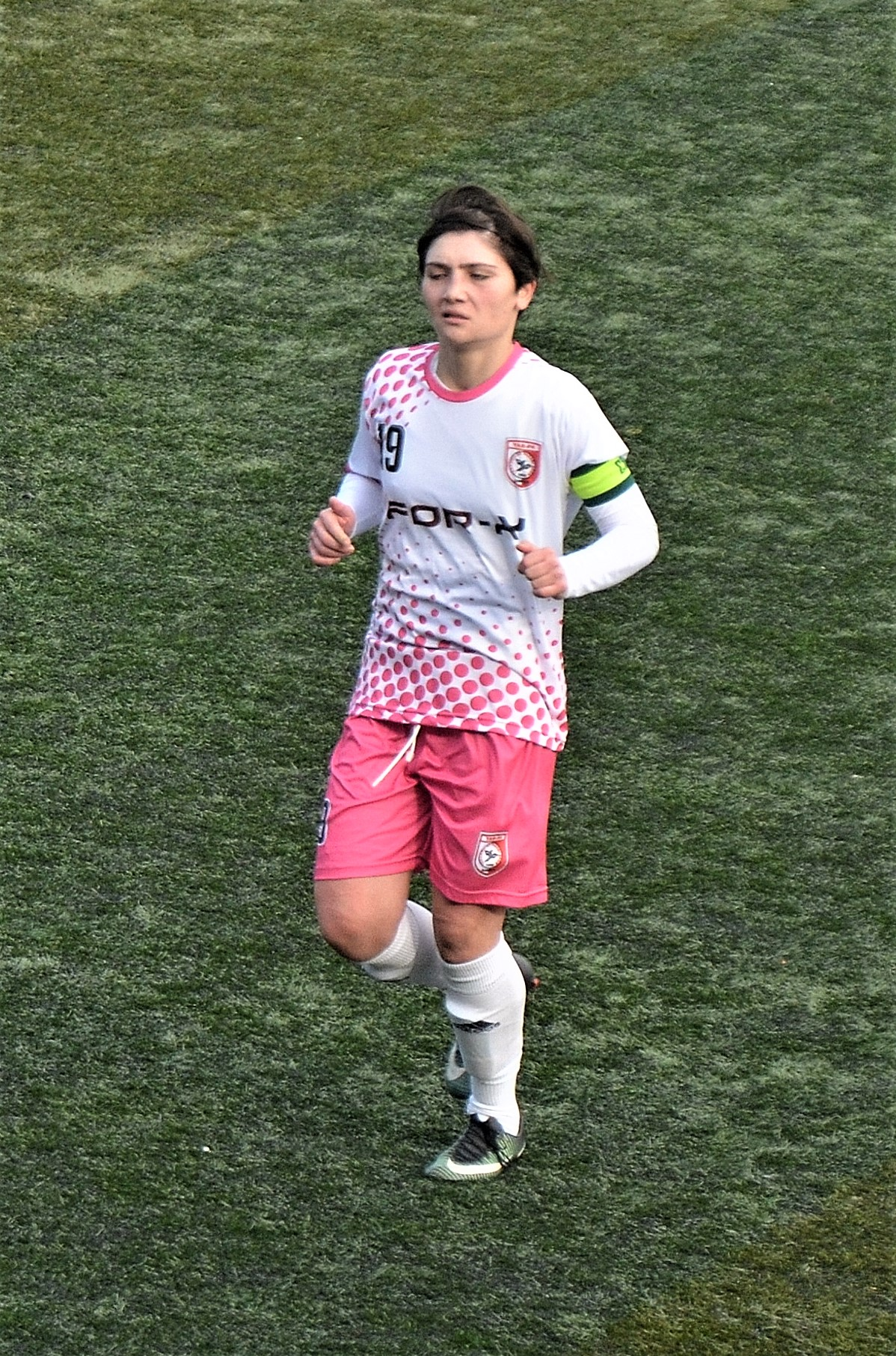
- Tamari Tatuashvili for İlkadım Belediyesi (November 2017)

Personal information
- Date of birth: April 12, 1991 (age 35)
- Place of birth: Tbilisi, Georgia
- Position: Defender

Team information
- Current team: Trabzonspor
- Number: 12

Senior career*
Years	Team	Apps	(Gls)
2007–2008	FC Dinamo Tbilisi		
2009–2010	FC Baia Zugdidi		
2011–2012	Lüleburgaz 39 Spor	17	(1)
2012–2015	Adana İdmanyurduspor	27	(1)
2015–2018	İlkadım Belediyespor	52	(1)
2018–2021	Hakkarigücü Spor	34	(6)
2022–	Trabzonspor	8	(0)

International career^{‡}
2007	Georgia U-17	3	(0)
2009	Georgia U-19	3	(0)
2009–	Georgia	14	(0)
- * Club domestic league appearances and goals as of 17 December 2022 ‡ National team caps and goals as of 9 April 2013

Tamari Tatuashvili (Georgian: თამარი ტატუაშვილი, born April 12, 1991) is a Georgian women's football defender currently playing in the Turkish Super League for Hakkarigücü Spor with jersey number 12. She has been a member of the Georgian national team since 2009.

== Club career ==
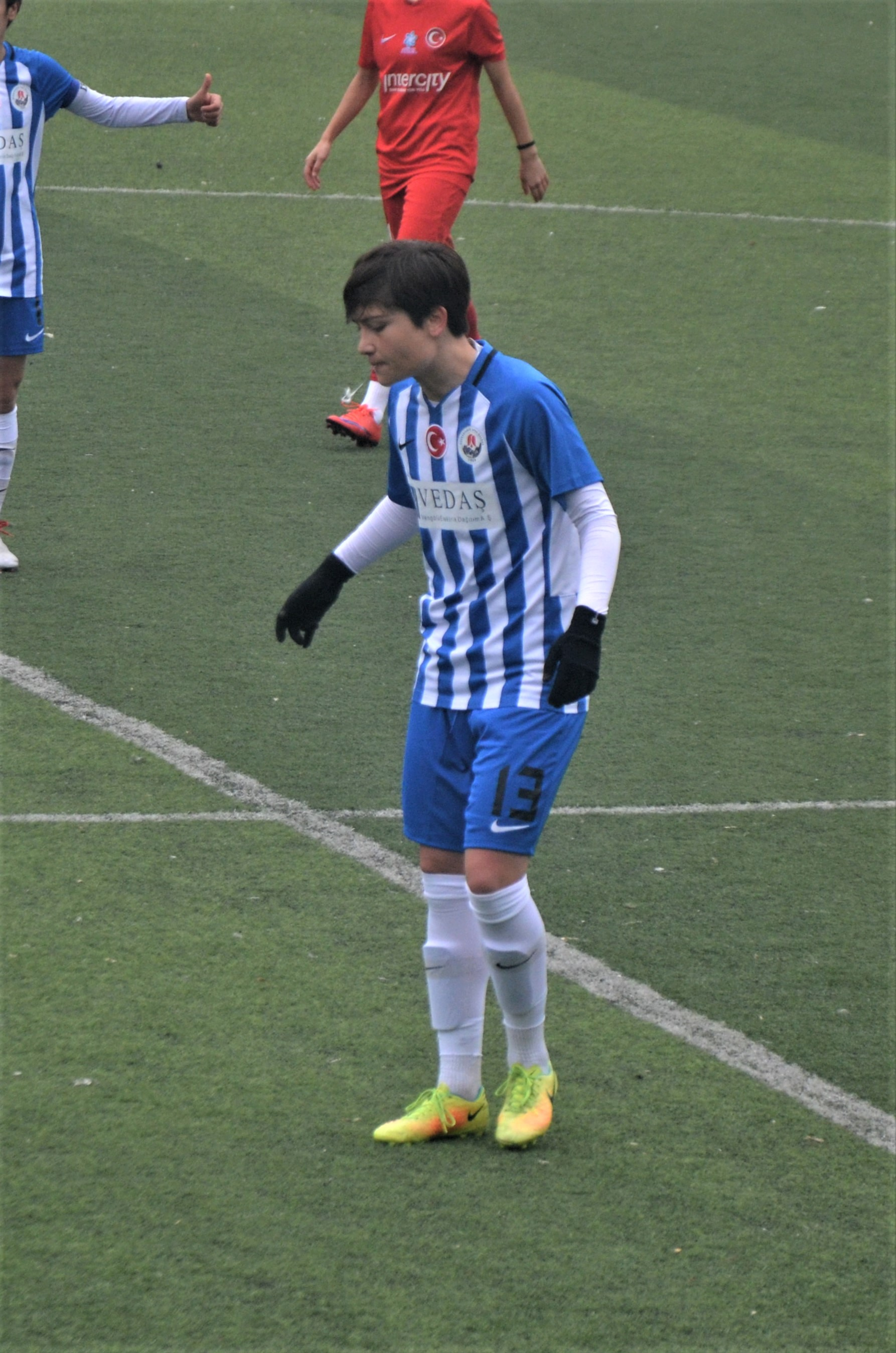
Tamari Tatuashvili of Hakkarigücü Spor in the 2018–19 Turkish Women's First League.

Tamari Tatuashvili played for the clubs FC Norchi Dinamo Tbilisi, FC Iveria Khashuri and FC Dinamo Tbilisi. She enjoyed in the 2007–08 season the Georgian champion title with FC Dinamo Tbilisi. Later, she transferred to FC Baia Zugdidi, which became champion in the 2009–10 season. Following the dissolution of the Georgian women's league in 2010, she moved to Turkey, and signed with Lüleburgaz 39 Sporr to play in the 2011–12 Turkish Women's First Football League. The next season, she was transferred by Adana İdmanyurduspor. After appearing two full seasons and a half season for the Adana-based team, she moved in February 2015 to İlkadım Belediyesi in Samsun.

She debuted at the 2007–08 UEFA Women's Cup – Group A7 match as part of the team FC Dinamo Tbilisi against the Ukrainian Arsenal Kharkiv on August 9, 2007, and played in three games of the tournament. She appeared at the 2010–11 UEFA Women's Champions League – Group 5 playing for FC Baia Zugdidi. She participated in three qualifying round matches. She captained her team.

After her team was relegated to the Second League at the end of the 2017–18 season, she transferred to the newly promoted First League club Hakkarigücü Spor in October 2018.

In the 2022–23 Turkish Women's Super League season, she transferred to Trabzonspor.

== International career ==
Tamari Tatuashvili was called up to the Georgia women's under 17 team, and played her first match against the girls from England at the 2008 UEFA Women's Under-17 Championship – Group round on October 27, 2007. She capped three times in the tournament.

She became part of the Georgia women's national under-19 team, and played her first match against France at the 2010 UEFA Women's U-19 Championship First qualifying round – Group 7 on September 19, 2009. She took part in the games against Serbian and Turkish junior women in the same tournament.

Appearing in the Georgia women's national team, she participated at all eight of the 2011 FIFA Women's World Cup qualification – UEFA Group 3 matches against Denmark, Scotland, Bulgaria, and Greece.

She played in three games of the UEFA Women's Euro 2013 qualifying – Group 2 appearing against Malta, Armenia, and Faroe Islands.

Tatuashvili participated at the 2015 FIFA Women's World Cup qualification – Group 2 matches against Lithuania, Montenegro, and Faroe Islands held in Lithuania in April 2013.

== International goals ==
No.	Date	Venue	Opponent	Score	Result	Competition
1.	28 February 2024	Mikheil Meskhi Stadium, Tbilisi, Georgia	North Macedonia	1–0	1–0	Friendly

== Career statistics ==
As of match played 17 December 2022.

Club	Season	League			Continental		National		Total	
Club	Season	Division	Apps	Goals	Apps	Goals	Apps	Goals	Apps	Goals
FC Dinamo Tbilisi	2007–08	Georgia championship			3	0	3	0	6	0
FC Dinamo Tbilisi	Total				3	0	3	0	6	0
FC Baia Zugdidi	2009–10	Georgia championship			3	0	14	0	17	0
FC Baia Zugdidi	Total				3	0	14	0	17	0
Lüleburgaz 39 Spor	2011–12	Turkish First League	17	1	–	–	0	0	17	1
Lüleburgaz 39 Spor	Total		17	1	–	–	0	0	17	1
Adana İdmanyurduspor	2012–13	First League	17	1	–	–	3	0	20	1
Adana İdmanyurduspor	2013–14	First League	10	0	–	–	0	0	10	0
Adana İdmanyurduspor	2014–15	First League	0	0	–	–			0	0
Adana İdmanyurduspor	Total		27	1	–	–	3	0	30	1
İlkadım Belediyespor	2014–15	First League	5	0	–	–			5	0
İlkadım Belediyespor	2015–16	First League	14	1	–	–			14	1
İlkadım Belediyespor	2016–17	First League	15	0	–	–			15	0
İlkadım Belediyespor	2017–18	First League	18	0	–	–			18	0
İlkadım Belediyespor	Total		52	1	–	–			52	1
Hakkarigücü Spor	2018–19	First League	16	4	–	–			16	4
Hakkarigücü Spor	2019–20	First League	15	2	–	–			15	2
Hakkarigücü Spor	2020–21	First League	3	0	–	–			3	0
Hakkarigücü Spor	Total		34	6	–	–			34	6
Trabzonspor	2022–23	Super League	8	0	-	-	0	0	8	0
Trabzonspor	Total		8	0	-	-	9	0	8	0
Career total			138	9	0	0	20	0	164	9

== Honours ==
=== Club ===
Georgia Championship

FC Dinamo Tbilisi
Winners (1): 2007–08

FC Baia Zugdidi
Winners (1): 2009–10
