= Sevinj Jafarzade =

Azerbaijani footballer (born 1994)

Sevinj Jafarzade Sevinc Cəfərzadə
Personal information
- Full name: Sevinj Fail gizi Jafarzade
- Date of birth: 1 June 1994 (age 32)
- Place of birth: Viravul, Azerbaijan
- Position: Forward

Team information
- Current team: Yüksekova
- Number: 17

Senior career*
Years	Team	Apps	(Gls)
2017	Donchanka Azov	5	(1)
2018–2019	Kubanochka	30	(9)
2020	Yenisey Krasnoyarsk	13	(6)
2021–2023	Krasnodar	56	(2)
2024	→Eastern Flames	5	(2)
2024–2025	Krasnodar		
2025–	Yüksekova	3	(0)

International career^{‡}
2012	Azerbaijan U19	3	(0)
2010–	Azerbaijan	16	(1)
- * Club domestic league appearances and goals as of 5 October 2025 ‡ National team caps and goals as of 1 December 2023

Sevinj Fail gizi Jafarzade (Azerbaijani: Sevinc Fail qızı Cəfərzadə; born 1 June 1994) is an Azerbaijani footballer who plays as a forward for Yüksekova in the Turkish Super League, and the Azerbaijan women's national team. She is a highly technical forward who has played as winger and midfield.

== Club career ==
Jafarzade played in Russia for eight years in the Russian Women's Championship, five years of which were with Krasnodar. She scored two goals in 56 matches at Krasnodar.

In January 2024, she went to Saudi Arabia to play for Eastern Flames in the 2024 season on loan from Krasnodar. End July 2024, she mutually terminated her contract with the club, which was to expire end of the year. She stated that she returns to Krasnodar.

In September 2025, she moved to Turkey, and signed with Yüksekova in Hakkari Province to play in the Turkish Super League, althoutgh she was offered a role in the club structure by the Krasnodar management.

== International career ==
Jafarzade is a member of the Azerbaijan national team, playing as a winger, and serves as the captain of the team.

== International goals ==
No.	Date	Venue	Opponent	Score	Result	Competition
1.	23 February 2022	Dalga Arena, Baku, Azerbaijan	United Arab Emirates	1–0	2–0	Friendly
2.	28 June 2022	TFF Riva Facility, Riva, Turkey	Turkey	1–1	2–2	Friendly
3.	17 July 2023	LNK Sporta Parks, Riga, Latvia	Latvia	1–0	1–1	Friendly
4.	22 September 2023	Dalga Arena, Baku, Azerbaijan	Cyprus	1–0	1–1	2023–24 UEFA Women's Nations League
5.	5 April 2024	Szent Gellért Fórum, Szeged, Hungary	Hungary	1–1	1–1	UEFA Women's Euro 2025 qualifying
6.	24 October 2025	Kazhymukan Munaitpasov Stadium, Shymkent, Kazakhstan	Kazakhstan	2–0	2–1	Friendly
7.	2 December 2025	National Stadium, Dhaka, Bangladesh	Bangladesh	1–0	2–1	2025 Bangladesh Tri-Nations Cup
8.	3 March 2026	Dalga Arena, Baku, Azerbaijan	North Macedonia	1–0	2–0	2027 FIFA Women's World Cup qualification
9.	3 March 2026	Dalga Arena, Baku, Azerbaijan	North Macedonia	2–0	2–0	2027 FIFA Women's World Cup qualification
10.	14 April 2026	Estadi Nacional, Andorra la Vella, Andorra	Andorra	1–1	3–1	2027 FIFA Women's World Cup qualification
11.	14 April 2026	Estadi Nacional, Andorra la Vella, Andorra	Andorra	2–1	3–1	2027 FIFA Women's World Cup qualification

== See also ==
- List of Azerbaijan women's international footballers
