= Zeliha =

Zeliha is a Turkish feminine given name. Notable people with the name include:

- Zeliha Ağrıs (born 1998), Turkish taekwondo practitioner
- Zeliha Kendir (born 2001), Turkish hockey player
- Zeliha Atıcıoğlu (born 1963), Azerbaijani sport shooter
- Zeliha Şimşek (born 1981), Turkish women's footballer
