= Bezan =

Bezan or Bežan is a surname. Notable people with the surname include:

- Bashir Ahmad Bezan, Afghanistani politician
- Gamze Bezan (born 1994), Turkish football player
- James Bezan (born 1965), Canadian politician
- Urša Bežan (born 1994), Slovenian swimmer
