= Azerbaijan women's national football team =

Azerbaijan
- Nickname(s): Odlar Yurdu (The Land of Fire)
- Association: Association of Football Federations of Azerbaijan
- Confederation: UEFA (Europe)
- Head coach: Siyasat Asgarov
- Captain: Aytaj Sharifova
- Home stadium: Tofik Bakhramov Stadium; Ismet Qaibov Stadium
- FIFA code: AZE
First colours	Second colours	Third colours

FIFA ranking
- Current: 75 (20 October 2026)
- Highest: 58 (December 2009)
- Lowest: 83 (December 2021)

First international
- Romania 4–1 Azerbaijan (Mogoșoaia, Romania; 18 November 2006)

Biggest win
- Macedonia 0–4 Azerbaijan (Tbilisi, Georgia; 13 May 2009); Azerbaijan 4–0 Bahrain (13 March 2015); Azerbaijan 4–0 United Arab Emirates (Baku, Azerbaijan; 20 February 2022)

Biggest defeat
- Sweden 17–0 Azerbaijan (Gothenburg, Sweden; 23 June 2010)

The Azerbaijan women's national football team represents Azerbaijan in international women's football. They are currently 79th in the FIFA Women's World Rankings. Azerbaijan has never qualified for any international tournament. The majority of Azerbaijan's home matches are held at the national stadium, Tofiq Bahramov Stadium.

== History ==
=== 2000s ===
In 2005, the AFFA had planned to send a team to the Women's World Cup qualifying, finally, the team withdrew before it started the qualifying tournament. On 18 November 2006, Azerbaijan played its first game against Romania in the city of Mogosoaia for the 2009 Euro qualifiers with a team led by Shamil Haydarov and captained by Kifayat Osmanova, losing 4–1 with its first goal scored by Svetlana Milyukhina, they played two matches later, in which they won against Estonia and lost against Bulgaria, they ended up eliminated from the tournament with 3 points. In 2009, Azerbaijan participated for the first time in a World Cup qualifying in Group 8, with Belgium, Czech Republic, Sweden and Wales, where it played three games, one won, one drawn, and one lost before the end of the year.

=== 2010s ===
In 2010, Azerbaijan played five games for the qualifiers, losing them all and being eliminated from the competition with 4 points, a game won, one drawn, and six games, scoring two goals and conceding sixteen. After that campaign, the team did not play to date back and has not scheduled any competition or friendly match. The team did not even enter the 2015 World Cup Qualifiers.

== Team image ==
=== Nicknames ===
The Azerbaijan women's national football team has been known or nicknamed as the "Odlar Yurdu (The Land of Fire)".

=== Home stadium ===
Azerbaijan plays their home matches on the Tofiq Bahramov Republican Stadium and the Ismet Qaibov Stadium.

== Results and fixtures ==
The following is a list of match results in the last 12 months, as well as any future matches that have been scheduled.

Legend

Win Draw Lose Fixture

=== 2025 ===
29 November Bangladesh Tri-Nations Cup	Malaysia	0–2	Azerbaijan	Dhaka, Bangladesh
18:00 UTC+6		Report	Bozdağ 3'; Mirzaliyeva 23'	Stadium: National Stadium; Referee: Anjana Rai (Nepal)

2 December Bangladesh Tri-Nations Cup	Bangladesh	1–2	Azerbaijan	Dhaka, Bangladesh
18:00 UTC+6	Manda 33'	Report	Jafarzade 19'; Manya 83'	Stadium: National Stadium; Referee: Om Choki (Bhutan)

=== 2026 ===
3 March 2027 FIFA Women's World Cup qualification	Azerbaijan	2–0	North Macedonia	Baku, Azerbaijan
12:00 (15:00 UTC+4)	Jafarzade 28', 78'	Report		Stadium: Dalga Arena; Attendance: 325; Referee: Anna Adamska (Poland)

7 March 2027 FIFA Women's World Cup qualification	Hungary	1–0	Azerbaijan	Felcsút, Hungary
14:30	Pápai 45+1'	Report		Stadium: Pancho Aréna; Attendance: 760; Referee: Filipa Pereira Cunha (Portugal)

14 April 2027 FIFA Women's World Cup qualification	Andorra	1–3	Azerbaijan	Andorra la Vella, Andorra
19:00	Morató 12'	Report	Jafarzade 15', 50' (pen.)	Stadium: Estadi Nacional; Attendance: 353; Referee: Kristina Kozoroh (Ukraine)

18 April 2027 FIFA Women's World Cup qualification	Azerbaijan	2–0	Andorra	Absheron, Azerbaijan
15:00 (17:00 UTC+4)	Açar 12'; Manya 64'	Report		Stadium: Bank Respublika Arena; Attendance: 130; Referee: Vesna Miletić (Bosnia and Herzegovina)

5 June 2027 FIFA Women's World Cup qualification	Azerbaijan	1-2	Hungary	Azerbaijan
		Report

9 June 2027 FIFA Women's World Cup qualification	North Macedonia	1-3	Azerbaijan	North Macedonia
		Report

- Azerbaijan Results and Fixtures – Soccerway.com

== Head-to-head record ==
The following table shows Azerbaijan's all-time international record, correct as of 1 June 2018.

Against	Played	Won	Drawn	Lost	GF	GA
Total	27	10	5	12	34	84

Source: Worldfootball

== Coaching staff ==
=== Current coaching staff ===
Position	Name	Ref.
Head coach	Siyasat Asgarov	

=== Manager history ===
Manager	Azerbaijan career	Played	Won	Drawn	Lost
(Azerbaijan) Shamil Haydarov	2006–2017	22	7	4	11
Siyasat Asgarov	20??–present	0	0	0	0

== Players ==
=== Current squad ===
The following players were named for the 2025 Bangladesh Tri-Nations Cup against Bangladesh and Malaysia in November 2025.

Caps and goals are correct as of 27 October 2025 after the second match against Kazakhstan.

No.	Pos.	Player	Date of birth (age)	Caps	Goals	Club
1	GK	Aytaj Safiyova	8 January 1997 (age 29)	28	0	(Turkish Football Federation) Trabzonspor
12	GK	Gunay Ismayilova	8 March 1998 (age 28)	2	0	(Turkish Football Federation) Amed
22	GK	Mehriban Shahmammadova	28 November 1998 (age 27)			
2	DF	Alina Nehmedova	3 October 2000 (age 26)	1	0	
3	DF	Jala Mahsimova	2 September 1996 (age 30)	21	0	(Turkish Football Federation) Amed
4	DF	Nigar Mirzaliyeva	28 April 2002 (age 24)	29	3	(Russian Football Union) Zenit
5	DF	Aysen Ahmadova	5 May 2000 (age 26)	25	2	(Hellenic Football Federation) PAOK
13	DF	Nargiz Hajiyeva	25 April 1998 (age 28)	0	0	
15	DF	Kamilla Mammadova	31 August 1996 (age 30)	13	0	(Turkish Football Federation) Asya Spor Kulübü
16	DF	Aysun Muradova	28 November 2000 (age 25)	0	0	
18	DF	Aydan Hasanova	26 January 2006 (age 20)	0	0	(Association of Football Federations of Azerbaijan) Neftçi PFK
21	DF	Fidan Jafarova	24 October 2004 (age 22)	2	0	(Association of Football Federations of Azerbaijan) Nuxa FC
23	DF	Yeliz Açar	19 December 1997 (age 28)	22	0	(Turkish Football Federation) Fatih Vatan Spor
6	MF	Esra Manya	11 April 1999 (age 27)	7	0	(Turkish Football Federation) Beşiktaş
7	MF	Mana Mollayeva	19 March 1998 (age 28)	20	1	(Association of Football Federations of Azerbaijan)
8	MF	Firangiz Teymurova	14 August 1999 (age 27)	7	0	(Association of Football Federations of Azerbaijan)
11	MF	Vusala Seyfeddinova	11 March 2000 (age 26)	27	2	(Turkish Football Federation) Fomget Gençlik ve Spor
14	MF	Joshguna Aliyeva	22 March 2002 (age 24)	15	0	(Turkish Football Federation) Kdz. Ereğli Belediye Spor
17	MF	Vusala Hajiyeva	3 October 1999 (age 27)	22	0	(Turkish Football Federation) Amed
20	MF	Peritan Bozdağ	15 June 1999 (age 27)	20	3	(Turkish Football Federation) Fatih Vatan Spor
9	FW	Sevinj Jafarzade (captain)	1 June 1994 (age 32)	18	2	(Russian Football Union) Krasnodar
10	FW	Kristina Bakarandze	19 May 1998 (age 28)	27	3	(Turkish Football Federation) Galatasaray
19	FW	Roya Aliyeva	23 July 2006 (age 20)	0	0	(Association of Football Federations of Azerbaijan) Neftçi PFK

=== Recent call ups ===
The following players have been called up to the squad in the past 12 months.

Pos.	Player	Date of birth (age)	Caps	Goals	Club	Latest call-up
GK	Nargiz Aliyeva	22 March 2002 (age 24)	3	0	(Turkey) Fatih Vatan Spor	v. Kazakhstan, 27 October 2025
DF	Alina Dorofeeva	31 August 1998 (age 28)	17	1	(Russia) Yenisey	v. Kazakhstan, 27 October 2025
MF	Aysen Salamzada		1	0		v. Kazakhstan, 27 October 2025
MF	Aysen Aliyeva	19 July 1997 (age 29)	9	1	(Turkey) Çaykur Rizespor	v. Kazakhstan, 27 October 2025

== Records ==
*Active players in bold, statistics correct as of 21 August 2021.

=== Most capped players ===
#	Player	Year(s)	Caps

=== Top goalscorers ===
#	Player	Year(s)	Goals	Caps

== Competitive record ==
=== FIFA Women's World Cup ===
FIFA Women's World Cup record									Qualification record							
Year	Result	Pld	W	D*	L	GF	GA	GD	Q	Pld	W	D*	L	GF	GA	GD
(China) 1991	Part of Soviet Union								qual.	Part of Soviet Union						
(Sweden) 1995	Did not enter								qual.	Did not enter						
(United States) 1999	Did not enter								qual.	Did not enter						
(United States) 2003	Did not enter								qual.	Did not enter						
(China) 2007	Did not enter								qual.	Did not enter						
(Germany) 2011	Did not qualify								qual.	8	1	1	6	2	60	−58
(Canada) 2015	Did not enter								qual.	Did not enter						
(France) 2019	Did not enter								qual.	Did not enter						
(Australia) (New Zealand) 2023	Did not qualify								qual.	8	2	1	5	5	16	−11
(Brazil) 2027	To be determined								qual.	To be determined						
(Costa Rica) (Jamaica) (Mexico) (United States) 2031	To be determined								qual.	To be determined						
(United Kingdom) 2035	To be determined								qual.	To be determined						
Total	-	-	-	-	-	-	-	-	-	16	3	2	11	7	76	−69

*Draws include knockout matches decided on penalty kicks.

=== Olympic Games ===
Summer Olympics record
Year	Result	Pld	W	D*	L	GF	GA	GD
(United States) 1996	Did not enter							
(Australia) 2000	Did not enter							
(Greece) 2004	Did not enter							
(China) 2008	Did not enter							
(United Kingdom) 2012	Did not qualify							
(Brazil) 2016	Did not enter							
(Japan) 2020	Did not enter							
(France) 2024	Unable to qualify							
Total	-	-	-	-	-	-	-	-

*Draws include knockout matches decided on penalty kicks.

=== UEFA Women's Championship ===
UEFA Women's Championship record									Qualifying record									
Year	Result	Pld	W	D*	L	GF	GA	GD	Q	Pld	W	D*	L	GF	GA	GD	P/R	Rnk
1984 to (Denmark) 1991	Part of Soviet Union								Part of Soviet Union									
(Italy) 1993	Did not enter								qual.	Did not enter								
(Germany) 1995	Did not enter								qual.	Did not enter								
(Norway) (Sweden) 1997	Did not enter								qual.	Did not enter								
(Germany) 2001	Did not enter								qual.	Did not enter								
(England) 2005	Did not enter								qual.	Did not enter								
(Finland) 2009	Did not qualify								qual.	3	1	0	2	4	9	−5	–	
(Sweden) 2013	Did not enter								qual.	Did not enter								
(Netherlands) 2017	Did not enter								qual.	Did not enter								
(England) 2022	Did not qualify								qual.	8	1	0	7	2	35	−33	–	
(Switzerland) 2025	Did not qualify								qual.	8	1	1	6	3	22	–19	▼ (Note: From Euro 2025 onwards a new qualifying format was introduced, linked to the Women's Nations League where teams are divided into leagues with promotion/relegation between the leagues at the end of each cycle.)	29th
2029	To be determined								To be determined									
Total	-	-	-	-	-	-	-	-	Total	19	3	0	15	9	66	−57	29th	

*Draws include knockout matches decided on penalty kicks.

=== UEFA Women's Nations League ===
UEFA Women's Nations League record
Year	League	Group	Pos	Pld	W	D	L	GF	GA	P/R	Rnk
2023–24	C	3	1st	6	5	1	0	9	2	▲	37th
2025	C	4	2nd	4	1	2	1	3	6	Same position	41th
Total				10	6	3	1	12	8	37th	

▲	Promoted at end of season
Same position	No movement at end of season
▼	Relegated at end of season
*	Participated in promotion/relegation play-offs

== See also ==
- Azerbaijan women's national football team
  - Azerbaijan women's national football team results
  - List of Azerbaijan women's international footballers
- Azerbaijan women's national under-20 football team
- Azerbaijan women's national under-17 football team
