= Osmanov =

Osmanov is a surname, and its female form is Osmanova. Notable people with the surname include:

- Alyona Osmanova (born 1988), Ukrainian model
- Bekir Osmanov (1911-1983), Crimean Tatar civil rights activist, agronomist, and partisan
- Kifayat Osmanova (born 1987), Azerbaijani former footballer
- Murad Osmanov (born 1985), better known as Murad Osmann, Russian photographer
- Nazim Osmanov (1939-1985), Crimean Tatar politician
- Redvan Osmanov (born 1993), Russian football player
- Shaban Osmanov (born 1991), Bulgarian footballer
- Sihamir Osmanov (born 1975), Macedonian retired amateur freestyle wrestler
- Yuri Osmanov (1941-1993), Crimean Tatar scientist, engineer, and civil rights activist
