= 2025 Bangladesh Tri-Nations Cup =

Women's international friendly football tournament

২০২৫ বাংলাদেশ ত্রি-জাতি কাপ

Tournament details
- Host country: Bangladesh
- City: Dhaka
- Dates: 26 November–2 December
- Teams: 3 (from 2 confederations)
- Venue: 1 (in 1 host city)

Final positions
- Champions: Azerbaijan

Tournament statistics
- Matches played: 3
- Goals scored: 6 (2 per match)
- Top scorer(s): 6 players (1 goal each)

The 2025 Bangladesh Tri-Nations Cup (Bengali: ২০২৫ বাংলাদেশ ত্রি-জাতি কাপ) was a women's friendly football tournament organized by the Bangladesh Football Federation (BFF). The tournament was held from 26 November to 2 December 2025.

== Participating nations ==
The following three nations participated in the tournament.

FIFA Women's Rankings, as of 7 August 2025

| Nation | FIFA ranking | Confederation |
|---|---|---|
| Bangladesh (Hosts) | 104 | AFC |
| Malaysia | 92 | AFC |
| Azerbaijan | 74 | UEFA |

== Venue ==
All the matches of the competition was played at this venue.

Dhaka
National Stadium
Capacity: 22,085
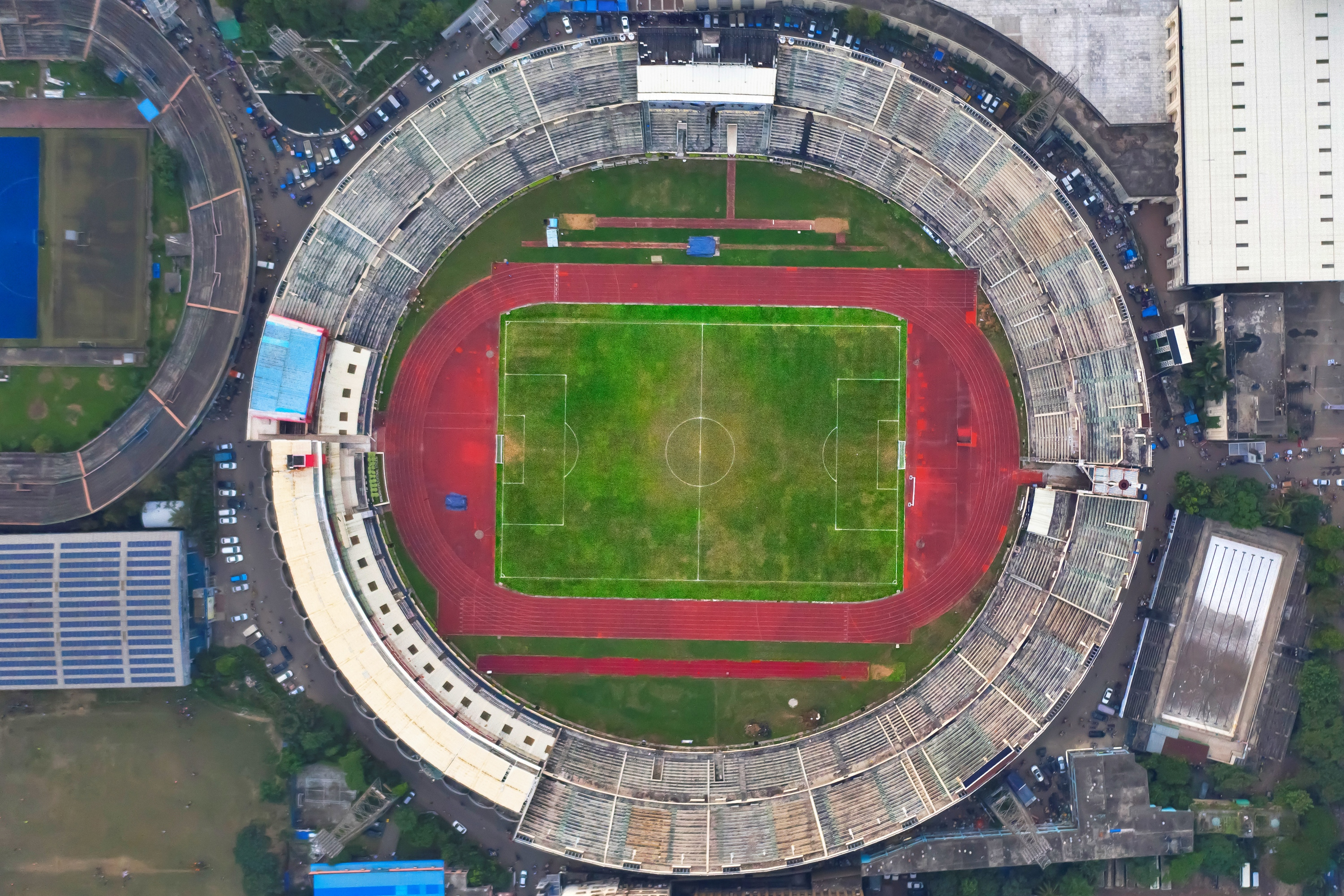

== Match officials ==
The following officials were chosen for the competition by BFF tournament committee.

Referees

- (Bhutan) Om Choki
- (Nepal) Anjana Rai

Assistant Referees

- (Bangladesh) Salma Akter Mone
- (Bhutan) Teshering Choden
- (Sri Lanka) Dhanushka Sampath Liyanagunawardhana

Match Commissioner

- (Bangladesh) Anwarul Haque

Referee Assessor

- (Bangladesh) Md Tayeb Hasan Shamsuzzaman
- (Bangladesh) Sujit Kumar Banerjee

== Standing ==
| Pos | Team | Pld | W | D | L | GF | GA | GD | Pts | Qualification |
|---|---|---|---|---|---|---|---|---|---|---|
| 1 | Azerbaijan | 2 | 2 | 0 | 0 | 4 | 1 | +3 | 6 | Champion |
| 2 | Malaysia | 2 | 1 | 0 | 1 | 1 | 2 | −1 | 3 | |
| 3 | Bangladesh (H) | 2 | 0 | 0 | 2 | 1 | 3 | −2 | 0 | |

Source: Flashscore
(H) Hosts

== Matches ==
All times are local, BST (UTC+6)

26 November 2025
19:00

| Bangladesh | 0–1 | Malaysia |
|---|---|---|
| | Report | Nur Ainsyah Murad 29' |

National Stadium, Dhaka
Referee: Om Choki (Bhutan)

29 November 2025
19:00

| Malaysia | 0–2 | Azerbaijan |
|---|---|---|
| | Report | Bozdağ 3'; Mirzaliyeva 23' |

National Stadium, Dhaka
Referee: Anjana Rai (Nepal)

2 December 2025
19:00

| Bangladesh | 1–2 | Azerbaijan |
|---|---|---|
| Manda 33' | Report | Jafarzade 19'; Manya 83' |

National Stadium, Dhaka
Referee: Om Choki (Bhutan)

== Statistics ==
=== Goalscorers ===
There were 6 goals scored in 3 matches, for an average of 2 goals per match.

1 goal

- (Azerbaijan) Esra Manya
- (Azerbaijan) Nigar Mirzaliyeva
- (Azerbaijan) Peritan Bozdağ
- (Azerbaijan) Sevinj Jafarzade
- (Bangladesh) Maria Manda
- (Malaysia) Nur Ainsyah Murad

== See also ==
- 2025–26 in Bangladeshi football
