= Fidan Jafarova =

Azerbaijani footballer (born 2004)

Personal information
- Date of birth: 24 October 2004 (age 22)
- Place of birth: Azerbaijan
- Position: Defender

Team information
- Current team: Hakkarigücü
- Number: 4

Senior career*
Years	Team	Apps	(Gls)
2024–2025	Neftçi Baku		
2025–	Hakkarigücü	4	(0)

International career^{‡}
2024–	Azerbaijan	6	(0)
- * Club domestic league appearances and goals as of 15 October 2025 ‡ National team caps and goals as of 1 July 2025

Fidan Jafarova (Azerbaijani: Fidan Cəfərova; born 24 October 2004) is an Azerbaijani women's football defender who plays for the Turkish Super League club Hakkarigücü, and the Azerbaijan women's national team.

== Club career ==
Jafarova played for Neftçi Baku in the 2024–25 season. She took part at the 2024–25 UEFA Women's Champions League qualifying rounds, and 2025–26 UEFA Women's Champions League qualifying rounds.

In September 2025, she moved to Turkey, and signed with Hakkarigücü to play in the Turkish Super League.

== International career ==
Jafarova has been a member of the Azerbaijan national team since 2024. She played at the 2025 UEFA Women's Nations League C matches.

== See also ==
- List of Azerbaijan women's international footballers
