= Nigar Mirzaliyeva =

Azerbaijani footballer (born 2002)

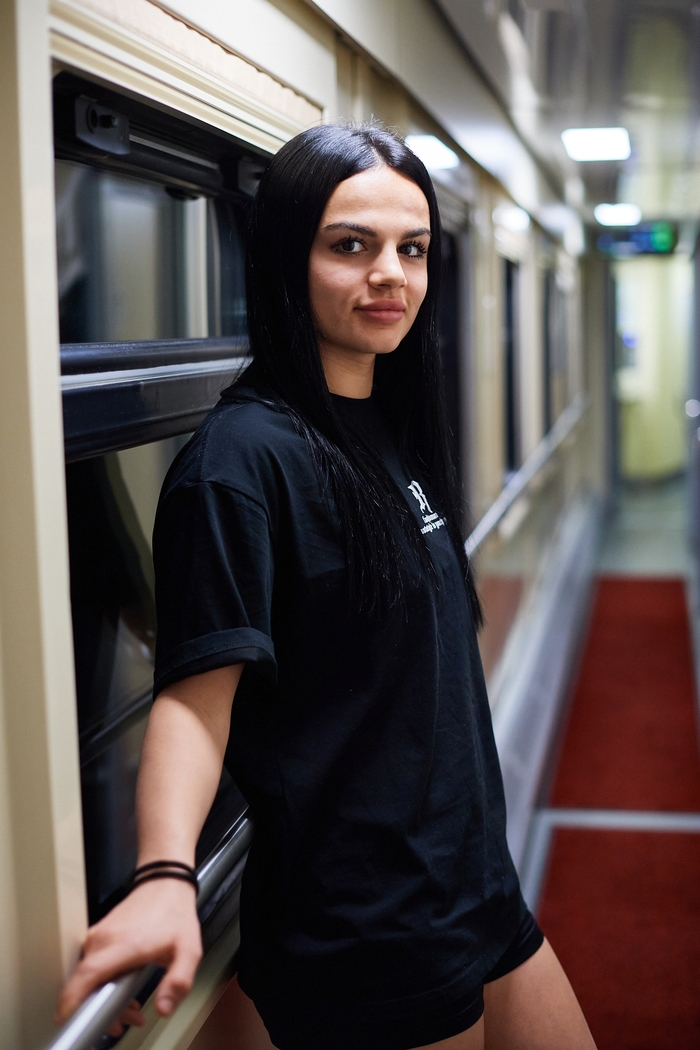
- Mirzaliyeva in 2025

Personal information
- Date of birth: 28 April 2002 (age 24)
- Place of birth: Baku, Azerbaijan
- Height: 1.72 m (5 ft 8 in)
- Position: Defender

Team information
- Current team: Hamburger SV
- Number: 4

Senior career*
Years	Team	Apps	(Gls)
2021–2023	Rubin Kazan	47	(0)
2023–2026	Zenit	40	(2)
2026–	Hamburger SV	11	(0)

International career^{‡}
2017–2018	Azerbaijan U17	10	(1)
2019–2020	Azerbaijan U19	3	(0)
2019–	Azerbaijan	49	(5)
- * Club domestic league appearances and goals as of 21 November 2026 ‡ National team caps and goals as of 29 November 2025

Nigar Mirzaliyeva (Azerbaijani: Nigar Mirzəliyeva; born 28 April 2002) is an Azerbaijani footballer who plays as a defender for Frauen-Bundesliga club Hamburger SV and the Azerbaijan women's national team.

== Career statistics ==
No.	Date	Venue	Opponent	Score	Result	Competition
1.	5 December 2023	Dalga Arena, Baku, Azerbaijan	Faroe Islands	1–0	1–0	2023–24 UEFA Women's Nations League
2.	4 June 2024	Dalga Arena, Baku, Azerbaijan	Turkey	1–0	1–0	UEFA Women's Euro 2025 qualifying
3.	4 April 2025	LFF Stadium, Vilnius, Lithuania	Lithuania	2–0	2–0	2025 UEFA Women's Nations League
4.	27 October 2025	Kazhymukan Munaitpasov Stadium, Shymkent, Kazakhstan	Kazakhstan	1–0	1–0	Friendly
5.	29 November 2025	National Stadium, Dhaka, Bangladesh	Malaysia	2–0	2–0	2025 Bangladesh Tri-Nations Cup
6.	9 June 2026	Petar Miloševski Football Stadium, Bitola, North Macedonia	North Macedonia	3–1	3–1	2027 FIFA Women's World Cup qualification

== See also ==
- List of Azerbaijan women's international footballers
