= Shokhista Khojasheva =

Kazakhstani footballer

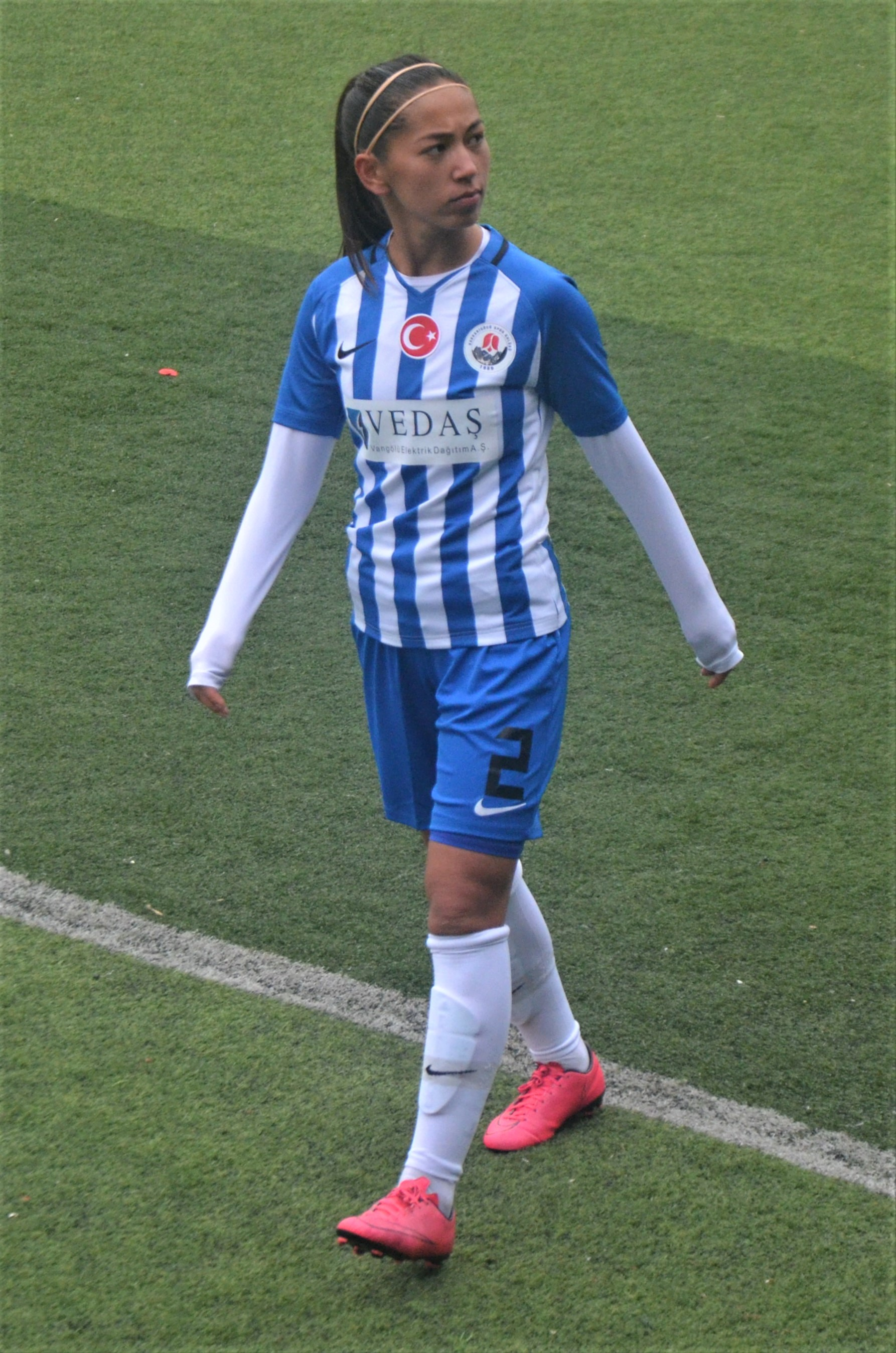
- Shokhista Khojasheva of Hakkarigücü Spor (December 2018)

Personal information
- Date of birth: 3 February 1995 (age 31)
- Place of birth: Kazakhstan
- Position: Defender

Team information
- Current team: Trabzonspor
- Number: 5

Senior career*
Years	Team	Apps	(Gls)
- Okzhetpes Kokshetau
2018–2022	Hakkarigücü Spor	56	(9)
2022	Trabzonspor	9	(2)

International career^{‡}
2017–2018	kazakhstan	5	(0)
- * Club domestic league appearances and goals as of 17 December 2022 ‡ National team caps and goals as of 6 December 2018

Shokhista Khojasheva (Russian: Шохиста Ходжашева, born 3 February 1995) is a Kazakhstani women's football defender, who plays in the Turkish Women's Super League for Trabzonspor with jersey number 5. She is part of the Kazakhstan women's national football team.

== Club career ==
Khojasheva was a member of Okzhetpes Kokshetau in her country.

She joined Hakkarigücü Spor in southeastern Turkey on 17 October 2018 to play in the Turkish Women's First Football League. On 27 October 2020, she left Turkey and returned to Kazakhstan. By April 2021, she returned to Turkey to play for her former team Hakkarigücü in the 2020–21 Turkcell Women's League. In the |2022–23 Turkish Women's Super League season, she transferred to Trabzonspor .

== International career ==
Khojasheva was part of the Kazakhstan women's national football team, and played in five matches of the 2019 FIFA Women's World Cup qualification.

== Career statistics ==
As of match played 17 December 2022022.

Club	Season	League			Continental		National		Total	
Club	Season	Division	Apps	Goals	Apps	Goals	Apps	Goals	Apps	Goals
Hakkarigücü Spor	2018–19	First League	15	2	-	-	-	-	15	2
Hakkarigücü Spor	2019–20	First League	15	4	-	-	-	-	15	4
Hakkarigücü Spor	2020–21	First League	3	0	-	-	-	3	0	
Hakkarigücü Spor	2021–22	Super League	23	2	-	-	-	-	5	2
Hakkarigücü Spor	Total		56	8	-	-	-	-	56	8
Trabzonspor	2022–23	Turkish Super League	9	2	-	-	0	0	9	2
Trabzonspor	Total		9	2	-	-	9	0	9	2
