= Nargiz Hajiyeva =

Azerbaijani footballer (born 1991)

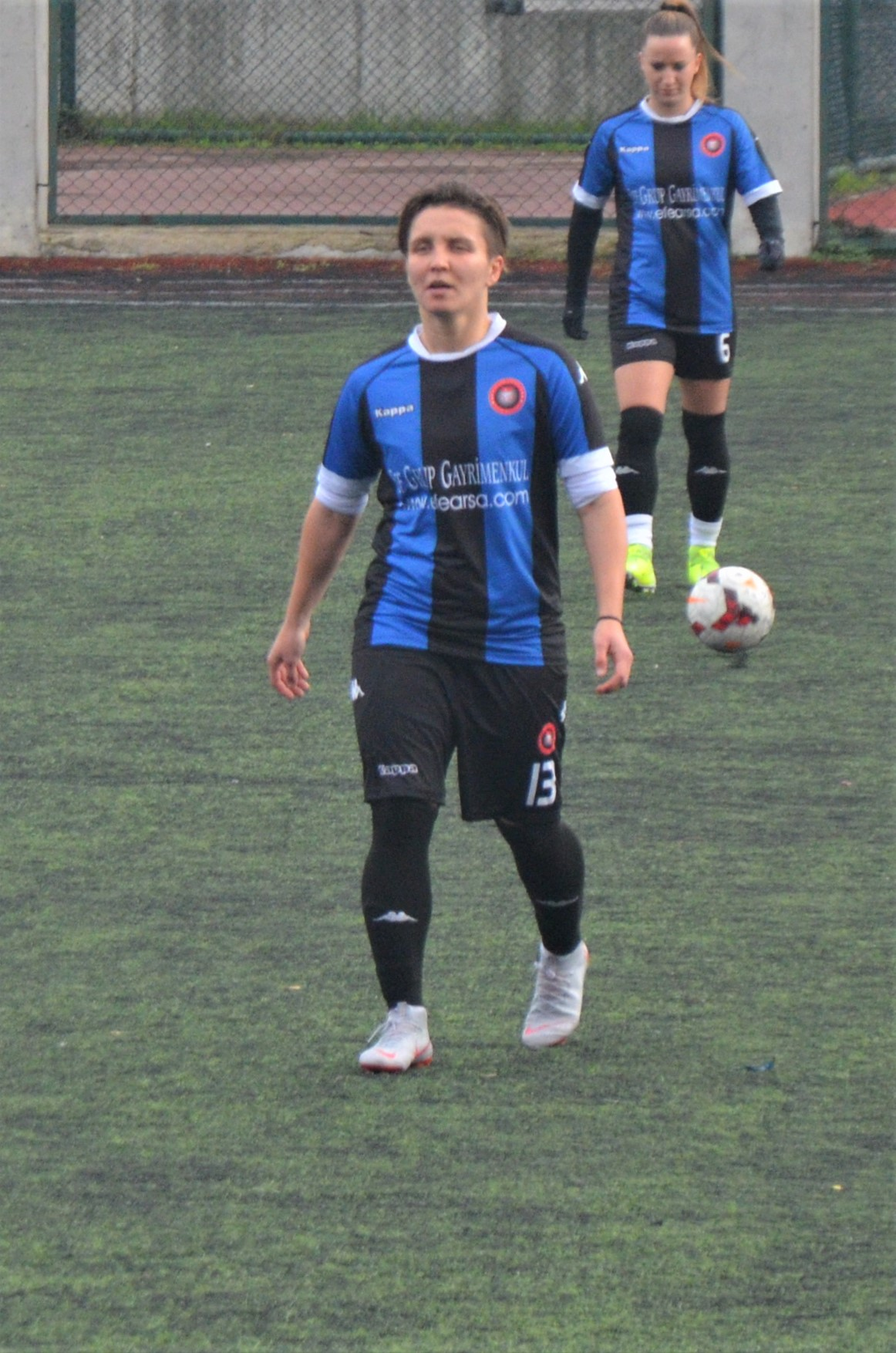
- Nargiz Hajiyeva of Fatih Vatan Spor (2019)

Personal information
- Full name: Yaska Nargiz Hajiyeva
- Date of birth: 12 April 1991 (age 35)
- Place of birth: Azerbaijan
- Position: Midfielder

Team information
- Current team: Trabzonspor
- Number: 23

Senior career*
Years	Team	Apps	(Gls)
2014–2018	Ugur FK		
2018–2019	Torpedo Izhevsk		
2019–2020	Fatih Vatan Spor	9	(0)
2020	Ryazan-VDV	0	(0)
2021–2022	Hakkarigücü Spor	27	(3)
2022–	Trabzonspor	13	(0)

International career^{‡}
2019–	Azerbaijan	11	(0)
- * Club domestic league appearances and goals as of 22 January 2023 ‡ National team caps and goals as of 11 March 2020

Yaska Nargiz Hajiyeva (Azerbaijani: Nərgiz Hacıyeva; born 12 April 1991) is an Azerbaijani women's football midfielder, who plays in the Turkish Women's Super League for Trabzonspor. She is a member of the Azerbaijan women's national team.

== Club career ==
Between 2014 and 2018, she played for Ugur FK (2014–2018) in her country. She then went to Russia to play for Torpedo Izhevsk in the 2018–19 season.

In 2019, Hajiyeva moved to Turkey, and joined the Istanbul-based Turkish Women's First League club Fatih Vatan Spor on 1 November. After appearing in nine games of the 2019–20 Turkish Women's First League season, she returned home as the league was discontinued due to the COVID-19 pandemic in Turkey. In 2020, she was with Ryazan-VDV in the Russian Football Championship.

In December 2021, she went to Turkey again and signed with Hakkarigücü Spor to play in the Turkish Super League.

In the 2022–23 Turkish Super League season, she transferred to Trabzonspor. In the |2022–23 Turkish Super League season, she transferred to Trabzonspor.

== International career ==
Hajiyeva played for Azerbaijan women's national team in all four matches of the UEFA Women's Euro 2021 qualifying Group D.

== Career statistics ==
As of match played 22 January 2023.

Club	Season	League			Continental		National		Total	
Club	Season	Division	Apps	Goals	Apps	Goals	Apps	Goals	Apps	Goals
Fatih Vatan Spor	2019–20	Turkish First League	9	0	-	-	0	0	9	0
Fatih Vatan Spor	Total		9	0	-	-	9	0	9	0
Hakkarigücü Spor	2020–21	Turkish First League	3	0	-	-	0	0	3	0
Hakkarigücü Spor	2021–22	Turkish Super League	24	3	-	-	0	0	24	3
Hakkarigücü Spor	Total		27	3	-	-	0	0	27	3
Trabzonspor	2022–23	Turkish Super League	13	0	-	-	0	0	13	0
Trabzonspor	Total		13	0	-	-	9	0	13	0

== See also ==
- List of Azerbaijan women's international footballers
