= Cemile Timur =

Turkish footballer, manager, and referee (born 1988)

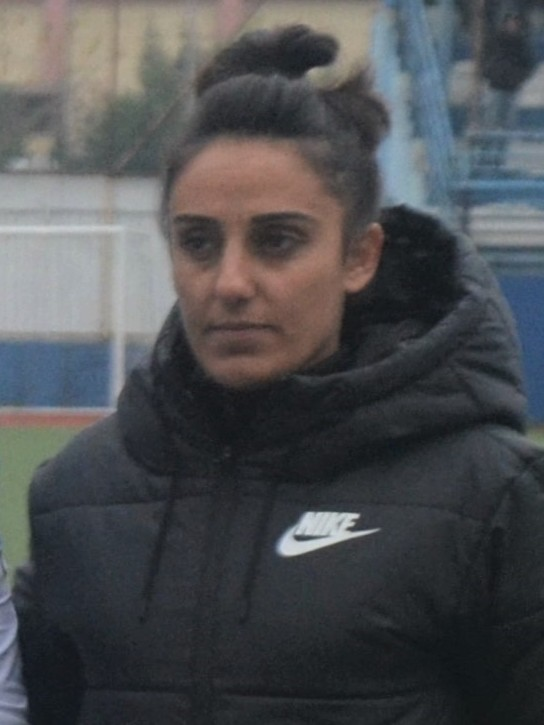
- Timur in 2018

Personal information
- Date of birth: 2 August 1988 (age 38)
- Place of birth: Hakkâri, Turkey

Senior career*
Years	Team	Apps	(Gls)
2010–2017	Hakkarigücü	104	(29)

Managerial career
- 2017–: Hakkarigücü
- * Club domestic league appearances and goals

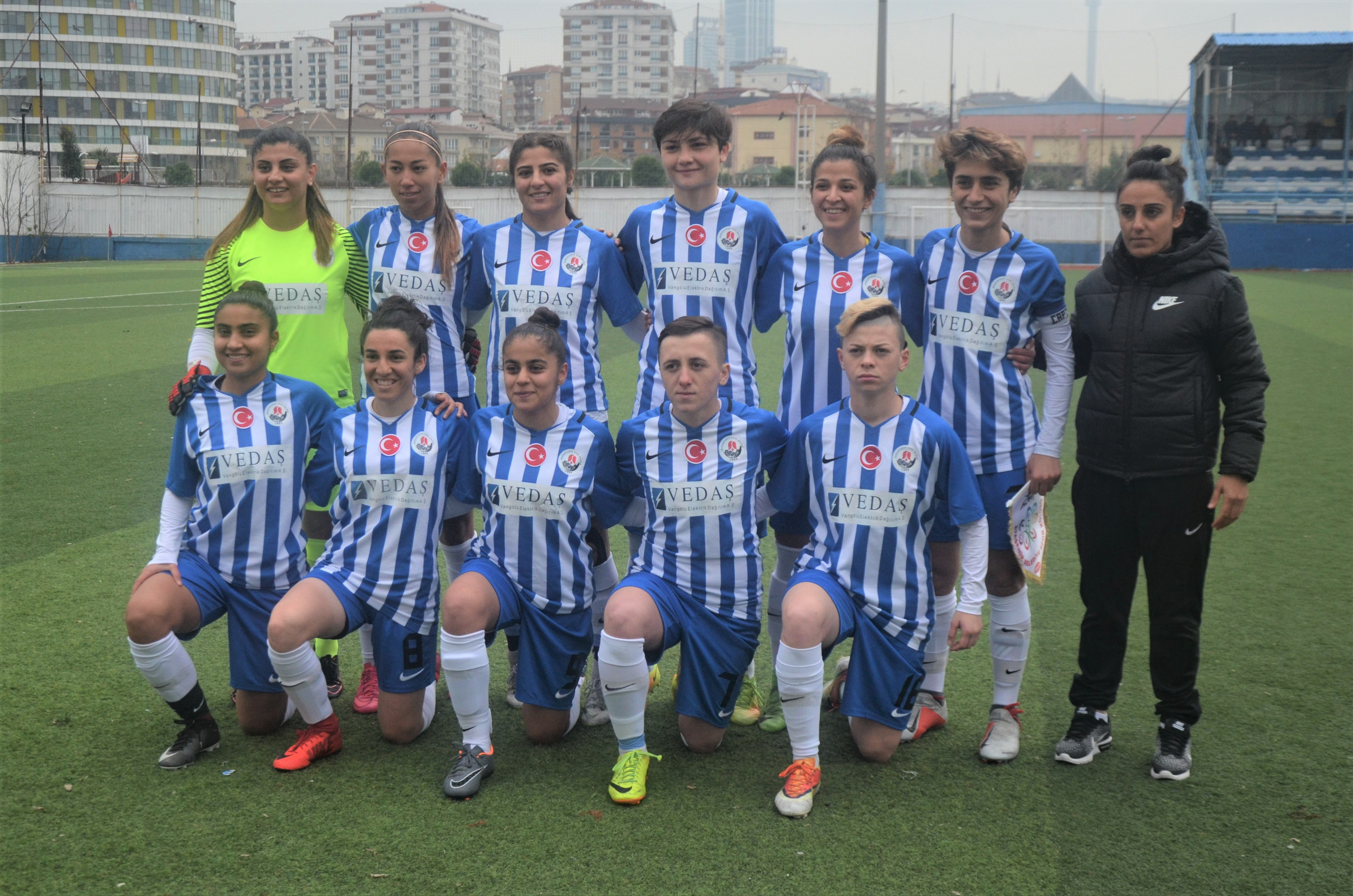
Cemile Timur (on right) and her team Hakkarigücü in the 2018–19 Women's First League.

Cemile Timur (born 2 August 1988) is a Turkish former women's footballer and referee, who currently serves as manager of Hakkarigücü Spor in the Turkish Women's First Football League. She founded the first women's club at her hometown in 2008.

== Early life ==
Timur was born to Kurdish parents in Hakkâri, southeastern Turkey on 2 August 1988. She is the eldest daughter of a family with four children. She studied computer programming at Hakkâri Vocational School.

== Sports career ==
Timur started taking part in athletics at the age of nine. Although she became successful at several competitive events, she had to retire from active athletics sport after seven years in 2007 due to lack of support. Later, she developed an interest in association football. She is a certified coach for athletics and association football, as well as a referee for both sports.

=== Club founder ===
During her high school years, Timur went to watch association football matches between girls at a regional boarding elementary school. At the same time, she served as referee in various interscholastic matches. After she witnessed the emotion and excitement of the spectators in the matches, she decided to form a girls' team. Despite the difficult sociocultural conditions due to the traditions of the strong conservative feudal society still existent in the Southeastern Anatolia Region, she was able to break down the taboos and form a team of girls, who came predominantly from villages in Hakkari Province. The girls saw a way out in a region with limited opportunities for girls by means of playing association football, despite cultural reactions to the wearing of shorts by girls. The parents supported their daughters because they were convinced that the girls could stand on their own feet by participating in sports in the university and earn money by this means.

20-year old Timur founded the first women's association football club Hakkarigücü Spor with only eight girls in April 2008 at a city, where this sport is dominated by males only. She was fully supported by her parents in her efforts. Her club Hakkarigücü Spor participated in the 2007–08 Turkish Girls' Football Championship. The next season, the team was qualified to play in the Turkish Women's Regional Football League. In the 2009–10 season, the team took part in the play-off matches for promotion to the Women's Second League, however they were unsuccessful. In 2010, two of the team were admitted to the Turkey girls' national U-15 and U-17 teams, who played at the 2010 Summer Youth Olympics in Singapore and in two friendly matches of the girls U-15 team. At the end of the 2010–11 season, the team was promoted to the Women's Second League. The club has currently about 50 adult players and 50 youth players in the lower-level teams.

=== Player ===
Timur obtained her license as a football player from Hakkarigücü Spor on 11 November 2008. She started playing in her team's first season of 2009–10 in the Turkish Women's Regional League. She enjoyed her team's promotion to the Women's Second League at the end of the 2010–11 season. She played for eight seasons for her club in total, taking part in 104 matches and scoring 29 goals.

=== Manager ===
Timur was appointed manager of the Women's Second League club Hakkarigücü Spor in November 2017. Finishing the 2017–18 league season as leader and winning the play-off matches, her team was promoted to the Women's First League in the 2018–19 season.

== Player statistics ==
As of match played 30 April 2017.

Club	Season	League			Continental		National		Total	
Club	Season	Division	Apps	Goals	Apps	Goals	Apps	Goals	Apps	Goals
Hakkarigücü	2009–10	Regional League	5	1	–	–	–	–	5	1
Hakkarigücü	2010–11	Regional League	7	9	–	–	–	–	7	9
Hakkarigücü	2011–12	Second League	11	5	–	–	–	–	11	5
Hakkarigücü	2012–13	Second League	13	5	–	–	–	–	13	5
Hakkarigücü	2013–14	Second League	15	6	–	–	–	–	15	6
Hakkarigücü	2014–15	Second League	22	0	–	–	–	–	22	0
Hakkarigücü	2015–16	Second League	16	2	–	–	–	–	16	2
Hakkarigücü	2016–17	Second League	15	1	–	–	–	–	15	1
Hakkarigücü	Total		104	29	–	-	–	–	104	29
Career total			104	29	–	–	–	–	104	29

== Managerial statistics ==
As of 15 October 2025

Team	From	To	Record				
Team	From	To	G	W	D	L	Win %
Hakkarigücü
Hakkarigücü	2017	2018	20	14	2	4	70.00
Hakkarigücü	2018	2019	18	7	5	6	38.89
Hakkarigücü	2019	2020	15	7	2	6	46.67
Hakkarigücü	2020	2021	3	0	1	2	0.00
Hakkarigücü	2021	2022	24	13	5	6	54.17
Hakkarigücü	2022	2023	14	3	7	4	21.43
Hakkarigücü	2023	2024	28	11	4	13	39.29
Hakkarigücü	2024	2025	26	8	8	10	30.77
Hakkarigücü	2025	2026	5	4	0	1	80.00
Total			153	67	34	52	43.79

== Honours ==
=== Club ===
Women's Regional League

Hakkarigücü
Winners (1): 2010–11 (player)

Women's Second League

Hakkarigücü
Winners (1): 2017–18 (manager)

=== Individual ===
- Golden Crystal: 2023-24 Women's Super League.
