= Jaylen Crim =

American soccer player (born 1998)

Personal information
- Full name: Jaylen Kennedy Crim
- Date of birth: November 2, 1998 (age 27)
- Place of birth: West Sacramento, California, United States
- Height: 5 ft 8 in (1.73 m)
- Position: Forward

Team information
- Current team: Tabzon
- Number: 19

College career
Years	Team	Apps	(Gls)
2016–2019	Saint Mary's Gaels	77	(11)

Senior career*
Years	Team	Apps	(Gls)
2021–2022	Hapoel Ra'anana		
2022–2023	Maccabi Kishronot Hadera		
2023–2025	Pogoń Szczecin	35	(14)
2025–	Trabzon	3	(0)
- * Club domestic league appearances and goals as of October 11, 2025

Jaylen Kennedy Crim (born November 2, 1998) is an American professional soccer player who plays as a forward for Turkish Super League club Trabzon.

== Personal life ==
Jaylen Kennedy Crim was born in West Sacramento, California, United States on November 2, 1998. She attended the local River City High School. During her senior year in 2016, she received a scholarship to play in the college team of Saint Mary's College of California in Moraga, California, where she intended to study Kinesiology and eventually to practice physical therapy. After graduation from the high school in 2016, she enrolled in the college.

== Early years ==
Inspired by her parents, Crim was at sports already when she was three years old. She started playing club soccer at age eight with Sacramento United, which practices at Granite Park in Sacramento, California.

She has been a member of the varsity team at the River City High School since she was a freshman. Before she signed a letter of intent in February 2016, as she was a senior, to join St. Mary's tram, she played five years in the school team, scored some great goals and has won some games with her athletic ability. She was four year varsity letterwinner and Tri-County Conference three-time Most Valuable Player. She scored 40 goals in 22 matches as junior and 123 goals in 83 varsity high school games.

During her college years at the Saint Mary's College of California between 2016 and 2019, she was a member of the college soccer women's team Gaels. In the four seasons, she appeared in 77 games and scored 11 goals in total.

== Club career ==
Crim made her first professional contract with the Israeli club Hapoel Ra'anana for the 2021–22 Ligat Nashim season.

For the next season, Crim transferred to another Israeli club Maccabi Kishronot Hadera.

At the end of August 2023, Crim signed a contract with the Polish club Pogoń Szczecin. She appeared in 21 league matches, scoring nine goals across the 2023–24 season. Together with her team, in June 2024, she won the Ekstraliga title. In July 2024, she extended her contract for one more year. In the 2024–25 season, she played in two qualifying matches for the 2024–25 UEFA Women's Champions League, scoring one goal in a match against the Israeli team Kiryat Gat.

In the beginning of July 2025, Crim signed with Turkish Super League club Trabzon.

== Honors ==
Pogoń Szczecin

- Ekstraliga: 2023–24
