= Esra Manya =

Azerbaijani footballer (born 1999)

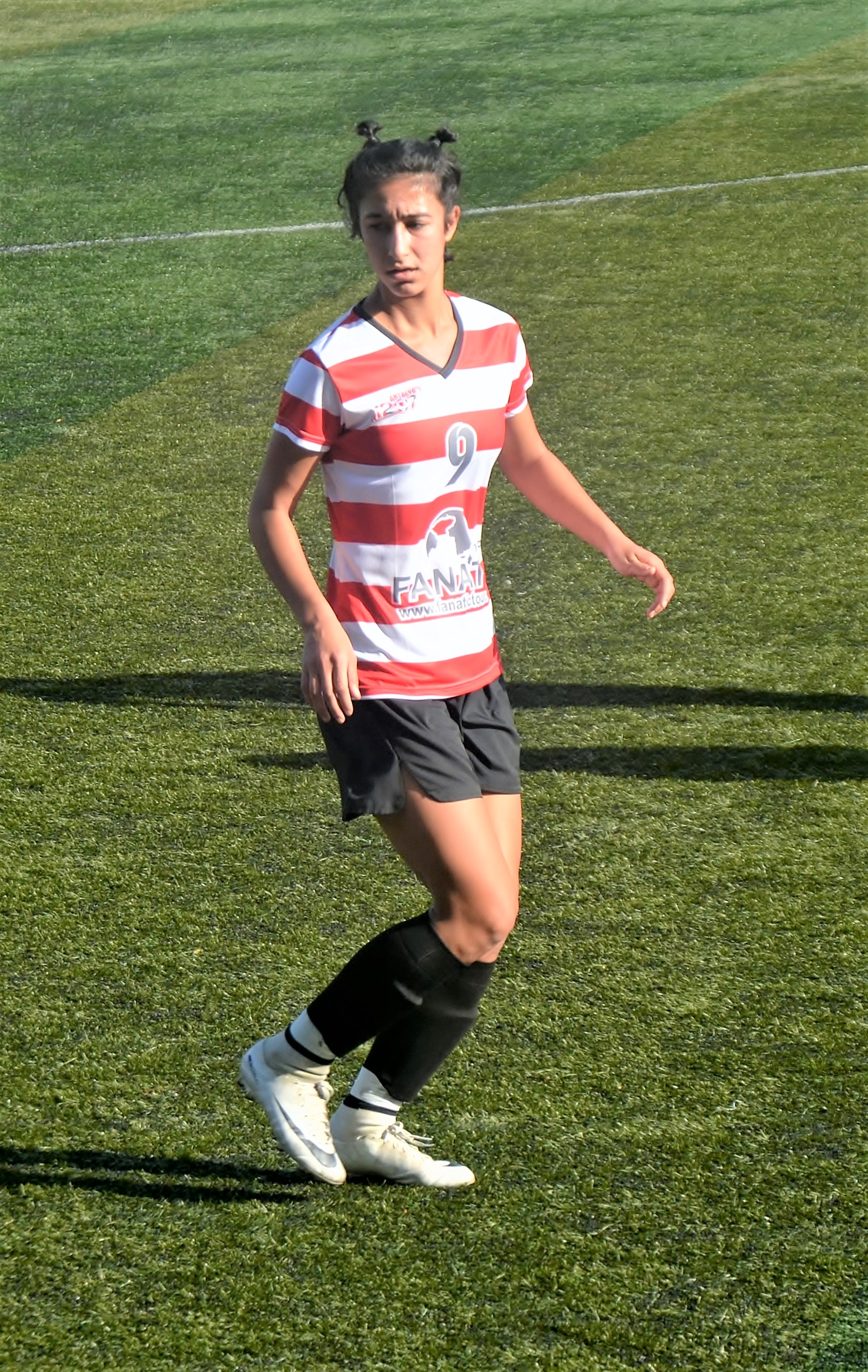
- Manya with 1207 Antalya Spor in 2017

Personal information
- Date of birth: 11 April 1999 (age 27)
- Place of birth: Antalya, Turkey
- Position: Midfielder

Team information
- Current team: Fatih Vatan
- Number: 19

Senior career*
Years	Team	Apps	(Gls)
2013–2019	1207 Antalyaspor	91	(31)
2020	Hakkarigücü	3	(0)
2021–2022	1207 Antalyaspor	27	(5)
2023–2024	Beşiktaş	38	(8)
2024–	Fatih Vatan	10	(0)

International career^{‡}
2014–2015	Turkey U17	17	(1)
2016–2018	Turkey U19	20	(4)
2023–	Azerbaijan	5	(0)
- * Club domestic league appearances and goals as of 15 December 2024 ‡ National team caps and goals as of 31 May 2024

Esra Manya (born 11 April 1999) is a women's football midfielder who plays for the Turkish Super League club Fatih Vatan. Born in Turkey, she represented her country of birth at under-17 and under-19 international levels before she joined the Azerbaijan national team at senior level.

== Club career ==
Manya signed on 21 May 2013 for her hometown club 1207 Antalya Muratpaşa Belediye Spor. She began playing in the 2013–14 season in the Second League. At the end of the 2014–15 season, her team finished the league as champions and was promoted to the First League. In the second half of the 2019-20 Second League season, she transferred to Hakkarigücü Spor to play in the 2019–20 First League and appeared in three matches. In the 2020–21 league season, she returned to her former club.

In the 2022–23 Super League season, she transferred to the Istanbul-based club Beşiktaş J.K.

== International career ==
=== Turkey ===
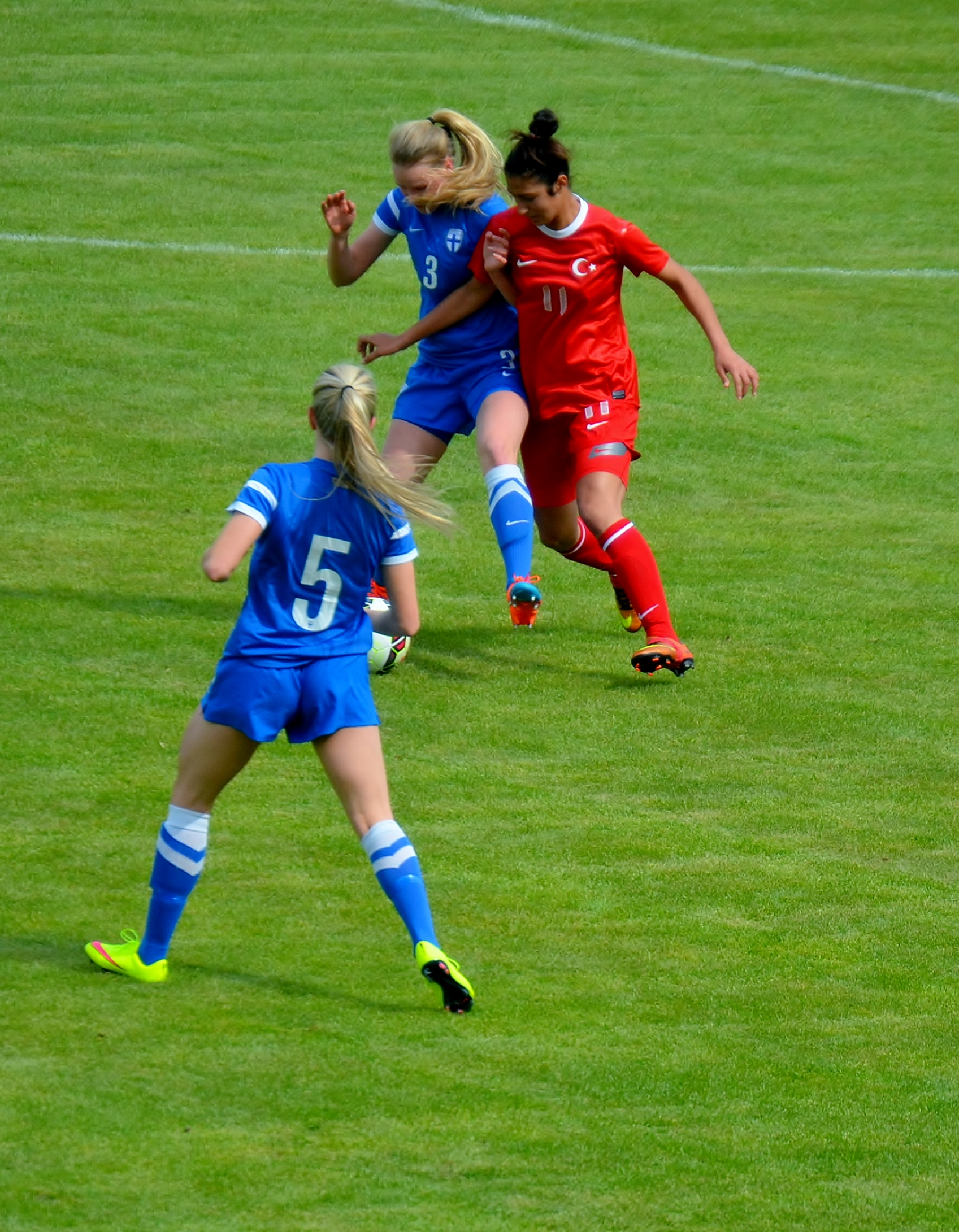
Esra Manya (red) of Turkey girls' U-17 challenging Finland player in the 2015 UEFA Women's Under-17 Championship qualification – Elite round match.

She was called up to the Turkey under-17 team and debuted in the UEFA Development Tournament against Portugal on 12 May 2014. Manya took part at the UEFA Women's Under-17 Championship qualification matches in 2015, 2015 Elite round, and 2016. She capped 17 times and scored one goal for the Turkey under-17 team so far.

Manya debuted for the Turkey under-19 team at the 2016 UEFA Women's Under-19 Development Tournament match against Slovenia on 9 June 2016. She enjoyed her team's tournament champion title. She took part at the 2017 UEFA Women's Under-19 Championship qualification Group 10, 2017 UEFA Women's Under-19 Championship qualification – Elite round Group 2 and 2018 UEFA Women's Under-19 Championship qualification Group 10.

International goals ^{1}
Date	Venue	Opponent	Result	Competition	Scored
Turkey under-17
18 October 2014	Stadion Kukuš Turnovo, Macedonia	North Macedonia	W 5–0	2015 UEFA Women's Under-17 Championship qualification Gr. 8	1
Turkey under-19
12 June 2016	Football Centre FRF Buftea, Romania	Azerbaijan	W 2–1	2016 UEFA Women's Under-19 Development Tournament	1
18 October 2017	Sportcentrum Bük Bük, Hungary	Hungary	L 2–5	2018 UEFA Women's Under-19 Championship qualification Gr. 10	1
8 April 2018	Turners Cross Cork, Ireland	Republic of Ireland	W 2–0	2018 UEFA Women's Under-19 Championship qualification Elite round Gr. 4	1

- ^{1} Friendly matches not included

=== Azerbaijan ===
Manya played for the Azerbaijan national team in the 2023–24 UEFA Women's Nations League C - Group 3 and the UEFA Women's Euro 2025 qualifying League B.

== Career statistics ==
As of match played on 15 December 2024

Club	Season	League			Continental		National		Total	
Club	Season	Division	Apps	Goals	Apps	Goals	Apps	Goals	Apps	Goals
1207 Antalyaspor	2013–14	Second League	10	6	–	–	3	0	13	6
1207 Antalyaspor	2014–15	Second League	16	8	–	–	11	1	27	9
1207 Antalyaspor	2015–16	First League	15	4	–	–	6	1	21	5
1207 Antalyaspor	2016–17	First League	22	4	–	–	5	0	27	4
1207 Antalyaspor	2017–18	First League	18	3	–	–	12	3	30	6
1207 Antalyaspor	2018–19	Second League	1	0	–	–	0	0	1	0
1207 Antalyaspor	2019–20	Second League	9	6	–	–	0	0	9	6
1207 Antalyaspor	Total		91	31	–	–	37	5	128	36
Hakkarigücü Spor	2019-20	First League	3	0	–	–	0	0	13	0
Hakkarigücü Spor	Total		3	0	–	–	0	0	3	0
1207 Antalyaspor	2020-21	First League	3	0	–	–	0	0	4	0
1207 Antalyaspor	2021-22	Super League	24	5	–	–	0	0	24	5
1207 Antalyaspor	Total		27	5		–	0	0	27	5
Beşiktaş	2022-23	Super League	17	5	–	–	0	0	17	5
Beşiktaş	2023-24	Super League	21	3	–	–	5	0	26	3
Beşiktaş	Total		38	8	–	–	5	0	43	8
Fatih Vatan	2024-25	Super League	10	0	-	-			10	0
Career total			169	44	–	–	42	5	211	49

== International goals ==
No.	Date	Venue	Opponent	Score	Result	Competition
1.	4 April 2025	LFF Stadium, Vilnius, Lithuania	Lithuania	1–0	2–0	2025 UEFA Women's Nations League
2.	24 October 2025	Kazhymukan Munaitpasov Stadium, Shymkent, Kazakhstan	Kazakhstan	1–0	2–1	Friendly
3.	2 December 2025	National Stadium, Dhaka, Bangladesh	Bangladesh	2–1	2–1	2025 Bangladesh Tri-Nations Cup
4.	14 April 2026	Estadi Nacional, Andorra la Vella, Andorra	Andorra	3–1	3–1	2027 FIFA Women's World Cup qualification
5.	18 April 2026	Bank Respublika Arena, Absheron, Azerbaijan	Andorra	2–0	2–0	2027 FIFA Women's World Cup qualification

== Honours ==
=== Club ===
Turkish Women's Second League

1207 Antalyaspor
Winner (1): 2014–15

=== International ===
UEFA Development Tournament

Turkey women's U-19
Winners (1): 2016
