= Kristina Shadoba =

Georgian footballer (born 1987)

Personal information
- Date of birth: 1 January 1987 (age 39)
- Place of birth: Soviet Union (now Georgia)
- Position: Goalkeeper

Team information
- Current team: Trabzonspor
- Number: 1

Senior career*
Years	Team	Apps	(Gls)
2005–2008	Dinamo Tbilisi		
2008–2011	Trabzonspor	40	(2)

International career^{‡}
2005	Georgia U19	3	(0)
2008–2011	Georgia	4	(0)
- * Club domestic league appearances and goals as of 17 April 2011 ‡ National team caps and goals as of 8 March 2011

Kristina Shadoba, aka Christina Shadoba (Georgian: კრისტინა შადობა, born 1 January 1987) is a Georgian women's football goalkeeper. She was part of Trabzonspor in the Turkish First League, before she played for Dinamo Tbilisi in her country. She was a member of the Georgia women's national U-19 and Georgia women's national teams.

== Club career ==
Between 2005 and 2008, Shadoba played for Dinamo Tbilisi in the Georgia women's football championship. She obtained her Turkish license on 8 February 2008, for Trabzonspor. She played three years in the Turkish Women's First League from the 2008–09 season on. During this time, she capped in 40 matches, and scored also two goals.

She debuted in the 2007–08 UEFA Women's Cup – Group A7 (forerunner of the UEFA Women's Champions League) playing in two matches for the Georgian club Dinamo Tbilisi. After her later club Trabzonspor became the Turkish league champion at the end of the 2008–09 season on, she played in three matches of the 2009–10 UEFA Women's Champions League – Group D round.

== International career ==
At the 2011 FIFA Women's World Cup qualification – UEFA Group 3 round, she appeared once for Georgia.

She played in the UEFA Women's Euro 2013 qualifying round – Group 2 matches.

== Career statistics ==
As of 17 April 2011

Club	Season	League			Continental		National		Total	
Club	Season	Division	Apps	Goals	Apps	Goals	Apps	Goals	Apps	Goals
Dinamo Tbilisi	2005–2008	Georgia championship			2	0	3	0	5	0
Dinamo Tbilisi	Total				2	0	3	0	5	0
Trabzonspor	2008–09	Turkish First League	16	0	–	–	0	0	16	0
Trabzonspor	2009–10	First League	6	2	3	0	0	0	9	2
Trabzonspor	2010–11	First League	18	0	–	–	4	0	22	0
Trabzonspor	Total		40	2	3	0	4	0	47	2

== Honours ==
Georgia women's football championship

FC Dinamo Tbilisi
Winners (1): 2006–07

Turkish Women's First League

Trabzonspor
Winners (1): 2008–09
