= Hakkarigücü Spor =

Hakkârigücü Spor
- Full name: Hakkârigücü Spor Kulübü
- Founded: 1989; 37 years ago
- Ground: Merzan Stadium
- Coordinates: 37°34′30″N 43°44′01″E
- President: Esra Ertuş
- Manager: (Turkey) Cemile Timur
- League: Turkish Women's Super League
- 2024–25: 9th

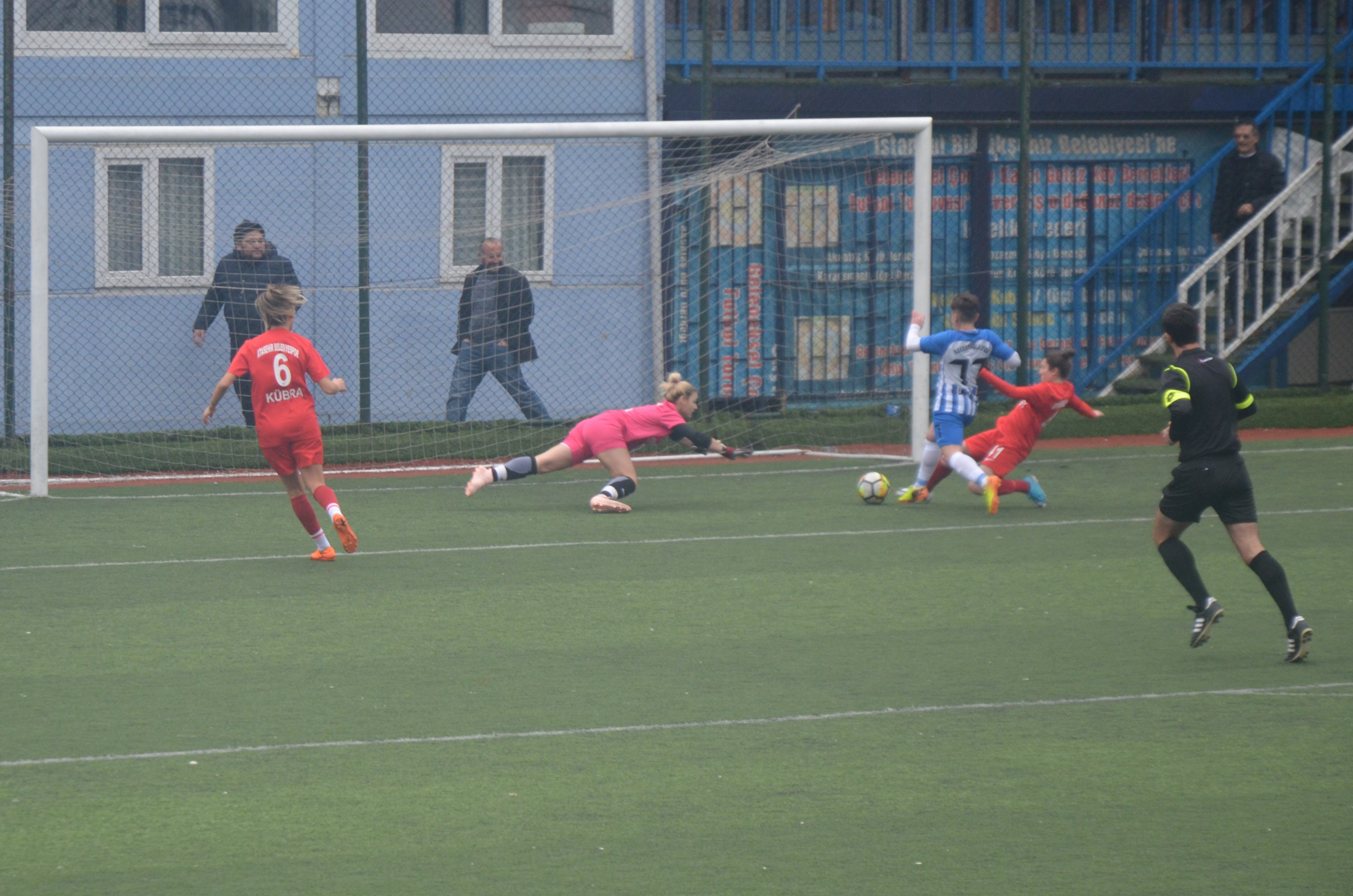
Hakkârigücü Spor (blue/white) attacking Ataşehir Belediyespor (red) in the 2018–19 Women's First League season's away match.

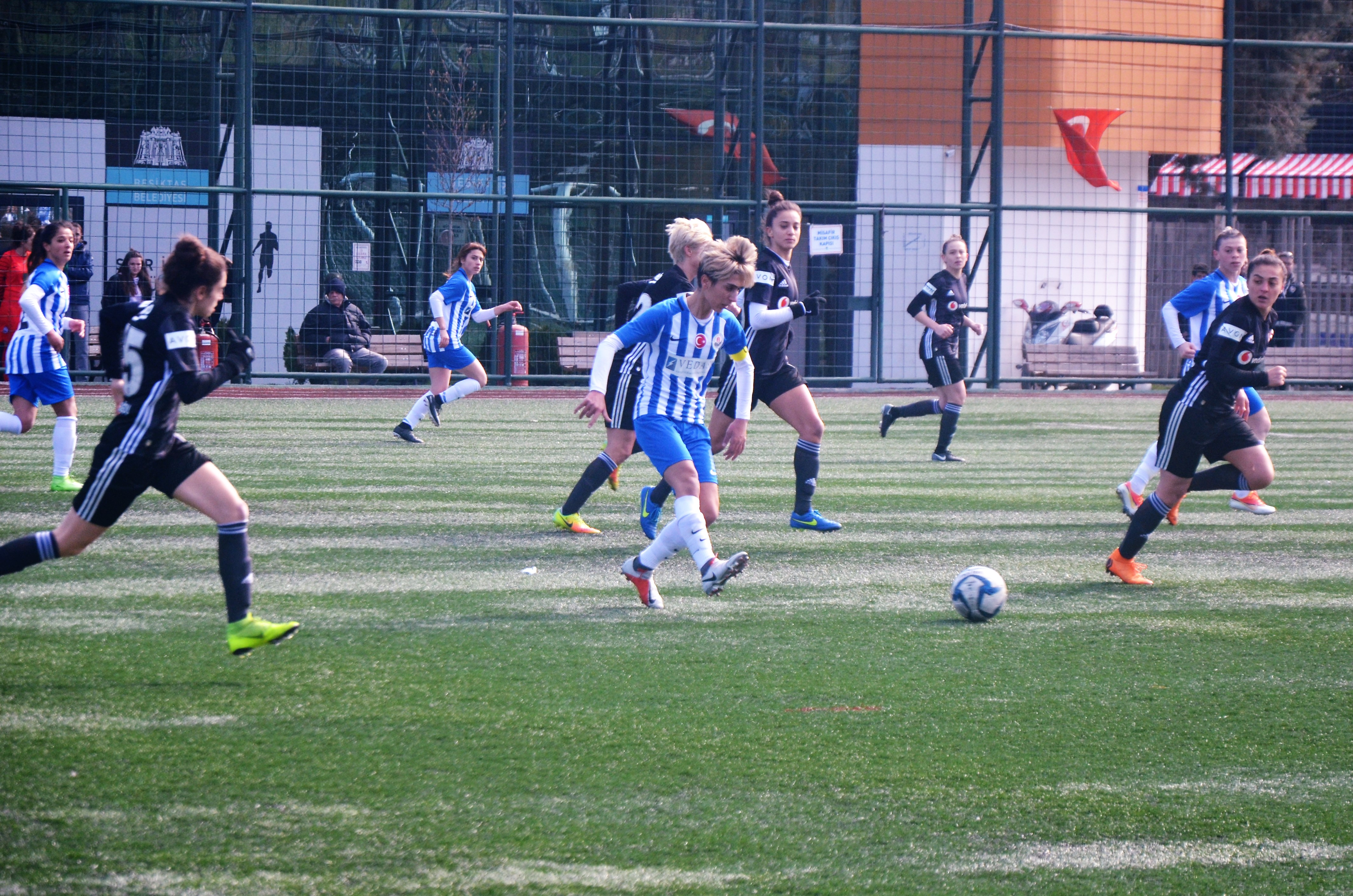
Hakkârigücü Spor (blue/white) attacking Beşiktaş J.K. (black/gray) in the 2018–19 Women's First League season's away match.

Hakkârigücü is a women's football club founded in 1989 and based in Hakkâri, eastern Turkey. The club plays their home matches in the Merzan Stadium.

== History ==
The women's association football club Hakkârigücü Spor was founded by Cemile Timur, than a 20-year old local woman. A former athletics performer in her high school years, she later developed an interest for association football, and founded the first women's sport club in the city at Southeastern Anatolia Region with strong conservative feudal society after persuading some parents of girls coming from the villages of the province. The team was initially formed with eight girls only. After taking part in the 2007–08 Turkish Girls' Football Championship, the team was qualified the next season to play in Group 4 of the Turkish Women's Regional Football League. In the 2009–10 season, the team took reached the play-offs for promotion to the Women's Second League, became however, unsuccessful. They were promoted in the 2011–12 season to the Women' Second League when the Women's Regional League was abolished. They played in total seven seasons in the Second League. Finally, the team became runners-up at the end of the play-offs of the 2017–18 season, and was entitled to play in the Women' First League for the 2018–19 season.

== Stadium ==
Hakkârigücü Spor play their home matches in the Merzan Football Field. As the dimensions of the football pitch are not standard, and the field lacks bleachers, it has to be improved. In order to meet the requirements of the Turkish Football Federation on grounds for the First League matches, the pitch will be widened 4 m (13 ft), changing rooms and bleachers will be added.

== Statistics ==
As of 15 October 2025.

Season	League	Pos.	Pld	W	D	L	GF	GA	GD	Pts
2009–10	Regional League Gr. 4	3	5	2	0	3	30	11	+19	6
2010–11	Regional League Gr. Eastern Anatolia	2	8	5	1	2	43	7	+36	16
2011–12	Second League Gr. Eastern Anatolia	4	11	7	3	1	77	7	+70	24
2012–13	Second League Gr. 8	4	13	11	0	2	58	9	+49	33
2013–14	Second League Gr. 7	5	17	15	1	1	76	14	+62	46
2014–15	Second League	7	22	10	1	11	35	40	−5	31
2015–16	Second League	7	22	9	3	10	30	27	+3	30
2016–17	Second League	4	18	9	5	4	52	19	+33	47
2017–18	Second League	2	20	14	2	4	57	16	+41	45
2018–19	First League	6	18	7	5	6	34	21	+13	26
2019–20	First League	6 (^{1})	15	7	2	6	31	24	+7	23
2020–21	Women's League Gr. B	13	3	0	1	2	2	8	−6	1
2021–22	Super League Gr. B	4	22	13	4	5	46	18	+28	43
2021–22	Play-offs		2	0	1	1	1	4	−3	1
2022–23	Super League Gr. A	7	16	5	7	4	18	18	0	22
2022–23	Play-offs		1	0	0	1	0	5	−5	0
2023–24	Super League	8	30	13	4	13	51	58	−7	43
2024–25	Super League	9	26	8	8	10	35	32	+3	32
2025–26	Super League	5	5	4 (^{3})	0	1	7	3	+4	16
Green marks a season followed by promotion, red a season followed by relegation.

- (^{1}): Season discontinued due to COVID-19 pandemic in Turkey
- (^{2}) Group standing, lost play-offs quarterfinals
- (^{3}) Season in progress

== Current squad ==
As of 11 October 2025

Head coach: (Turkey) Cemile Timur

Note: Flags indicate national team as defined under FIFA eligibility rules; some limited exceptions apply. Players may hold more than one non-FIFA nationality.

No.	Pos.	Nation	Player
12	GK	BRA	Bia Nicoleti
45	GK	TUR	Hilal Subay
3	DF	KEN	Vivian Nasaka
4	DF	AZE	Fidan Jafarova
5	DF	GHA	Elizabeth Oppong
15	DF	ZAM	Lushomo Mweemba
20	DF	TUR	Sevgi Sevin Ergen
22	DF	TUR	Hümeyra Şanver
24	DF	TUR	Sümeyye Tertemiz

No.	Pos.	Nation	Player
10	MF	BFA	Rasmata Sawadogo
11	MF	TUR	Hatice Yaşar
13	MF	ZAM	Martha Tembo
17	MF		Yaren Çolak
61	MF	TUR	Meryem Küçükbirinci
8	FW	TUR	Özlem Akkaya
14	FW	GHA	Elizabeth Owusuaa
25	FW	CMR	Kevine Ossol
97	FW	TUR	Buket Karadağ

== Formet notable players ==
Armenia

- Armine Khachatryan

Azerbaijan

- Peritan Bozdağ
- Nargiz Hajiyeva
- Esra Manya
- Aytaj Sharifova

Brazil

- Juliette Nana

Botswana

- Lone Gaofetoge

Cameroon

- Brigitte Omboudou
- Marie Ngah

Georgia

- Kristina Bakarandze
- Teona Bakradze
- Tamari Tatuashvili

Ghana

- Ernestina Abambila
- Patience Peterson-Kundok
- Suzzy Teye

Kazakhstan

- Shokhista Khojasheva
- Angelina Portnova

Kenya

- Mwanalima Adam Jereko

Nigeria

- Tochukwu Oluehi

Turkey

- Güzide Alçu
- Emine Demir
- Başak Ersoy
- Emine Gümüş

Zambia

- Margaret Belemu
- Hellen Chanda
- Misozi Zulu

== Kit history ==
2018–19 home	2018–19 away	2019–20 away	2021–22 home	2021–22 away	2024–25 away

== Squad history ==
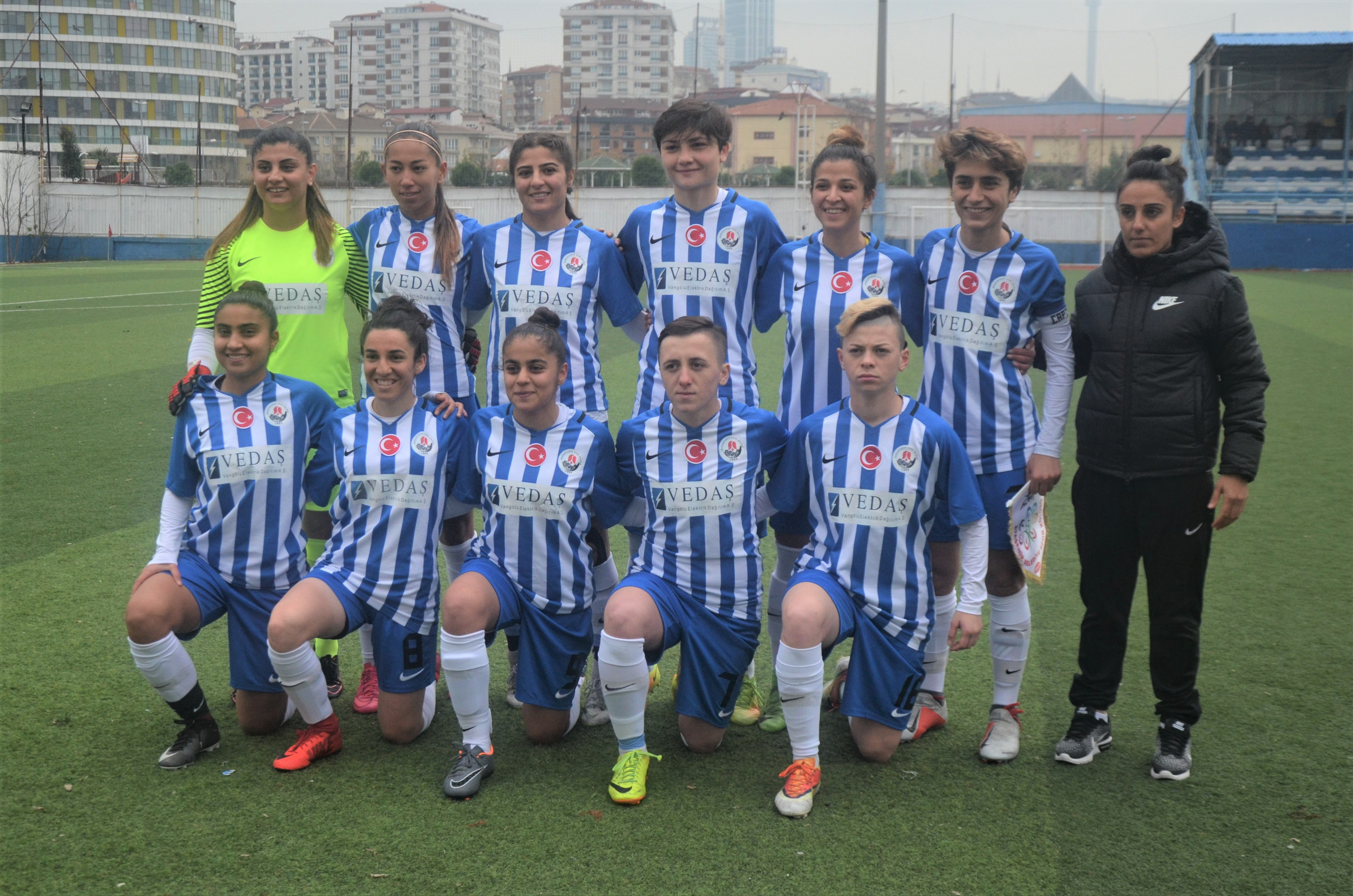
Hakkârigücü Spor squad in the 2018–19 Women's First League season
