= Peritan Bozdağ =

Azerbaijani footballer (born 1999)

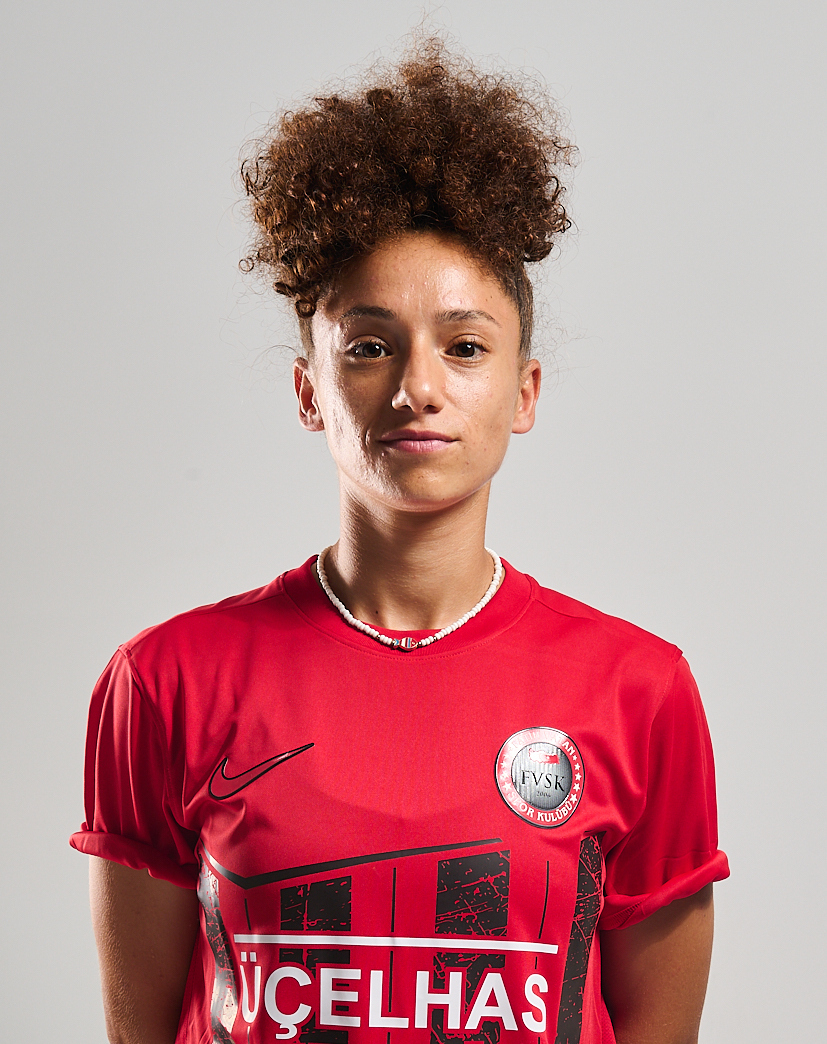
- Bozdağ with Fatih Vatan Spor in 2024

Personal information
- Date of birth: 15 June 1999 (age 27)
- Place of birth: Çeşme, Turkey
- Height: 1.65 m (5 ft 5 in)
- Position: Forward

Team information
- Current team: Fenerbahçe
- Number: 16

Senior career*
Years	Team	Apps	(Gls)
2015–2019	Konak	38	(7)
2019–2021	Hakkarigücü	18	(3)
2021–2022	Altay	23	(5)
2022–2025	Fatih Vatan	70	(10)
2025–	Fenerbahçe	24	(5)

International career^{‡}
2013	Turkey U15	2	(0)
2017–2018	Azerbaijan U19	6	(0)
2021–	Azerbaijan	20	(3)
- * Club domestic league appearances and goals as of 05:40, 16 December 2025 (UTC) ‡ National team caps and goals as of 29 November 2025

Peritan Bozdağ (born 15 June 1999) is a footballer who plays as a forward for Turkish Women's Super League club Fenerbahçe. Born in Turkey, she plays for the Azerbaijan women's national team.

== Club career ==
Bozdağ has played for Konak Belediyespor and Hakkarigücü Spor in Turkey from 2015 to 2021.

In the 2021–22 Turkish Super League season, she transferred to Altay. In the 2022–23 Turkish Super League season, she played for Fatih Vatan Spor.

== International career ==
Bozdağ made her senior debut for Azerbaijan on 11 June 2021 in a 2–3 friendly away loss to Georgia. She scored her first international goals on 20 February 2022 in a friendly match against United Arab Emirates at the Dalga Arena.

== International goals ==
No.	Date	Venue	Opponent	Score	Result	Competition
1.	20 February 2022	Dalga Arena, Baku, Azerbaijan	United Arab Emirates	1–0	4–0	Friendly
2.	20 February 2022	Dalga Arena, Baku, Azerbaijan	United Arab Emirates	2–0	4–0	Friendly
3.	29 November 2025	National Stadium, Dhaka, Bangladesh	Malaysia	1–0	2–0	2025 Bangladesh Tri-Nations Cup

== Honours ==
Fenerbahçe

- Turkish Super League: 2025–26

== Career statistics ==
As of 15 December 2024

Club	Season	League			Continental		National		Total	
Club	Season	Division	Apps	Goals	Apps	Goals	Apps	Goals	Apps	Goals
Konak	2013–16	First League	1	0	–	–	2	0	3	0
Konak	2016–17	First League	10	2	–	–	0	0	10	2
Konak	2017–18	First League	13	3	–	–	0	8	13	3
Konak	2018–19	First League	14	2	–	–	0	0	14	2
Konak	Total		38	7	–	–	2	0	40	7
Hakkarigücü	2019–20	First League	15	1	–	–	0	0	15	1
Hakkarigücü	2020–21	First League	3	2	–	–	0	0	3	2
Hakkarigücü	Total		18	3	–	–	2	0	18	3
Altay	2021–22	Super League	23	5	–	–	0	0	23	5
Fatih Vatan	2022–23	Super League	18	2	–	–	0	0	18	2
Fatih Vatan	2023–24	Super League	27	3	–	–	0	0	27	3
Fatih Vatan	2024–25	Super League	12	1	–	–	0	0	12	1
Fatih Vatan	Total		57	6	–	–	0	0	57	6
Fenerbahçe	2025–26	Super League	24	5	–	–	0	0	24	5
Career total			160	26	-	–	2	0	162	26
