= Setora Takaboeva =

Uzbekistani footballer

Personal information
- Full name: Setora Adxam qizi Takaboeva
- Date of birth: 8 August 2001 (age 25)
- Place of birth: Guliston, Uzbekistan
- Position: Midfielder

Team information
- Current team: Trabzonspor
- Number: 10

Senior career*
Years	Team	Apps	(Gls)
- Sogdiana
2021–	Trabzonspor	5	(0)

International career^{‡}
2019	Uzbekistan U19	3	(0)
2019–	Uzbekistan	2+	(1)
- * Club domestic league appearances and goals as of 112 January 2022 ‡ National team caps and goals as of 10 September 2019

Setora Takaboeva (Uzbek: Sitora Taqaboyeva; born 8 August 2001) is an Uzbekistani footballer who plays as a midfielder for Trabzonspor in Turkey, and the Uzbekistan women's national team.

== Club career ==
In 2021, she moved to Turkey and signed with the re-established team Trabzonspor to play in the Turkish Women's Football Super League.

== International career ==
Takaboeva capped for Uzbekistan at senior level in September 2019, during a 1–1 friendly draw against India and the Hope Cup.

== See also ==
- List of Uzbekistan women's international footballers
