= Aybüke Arslan =

Turkish footballer (born 1994)

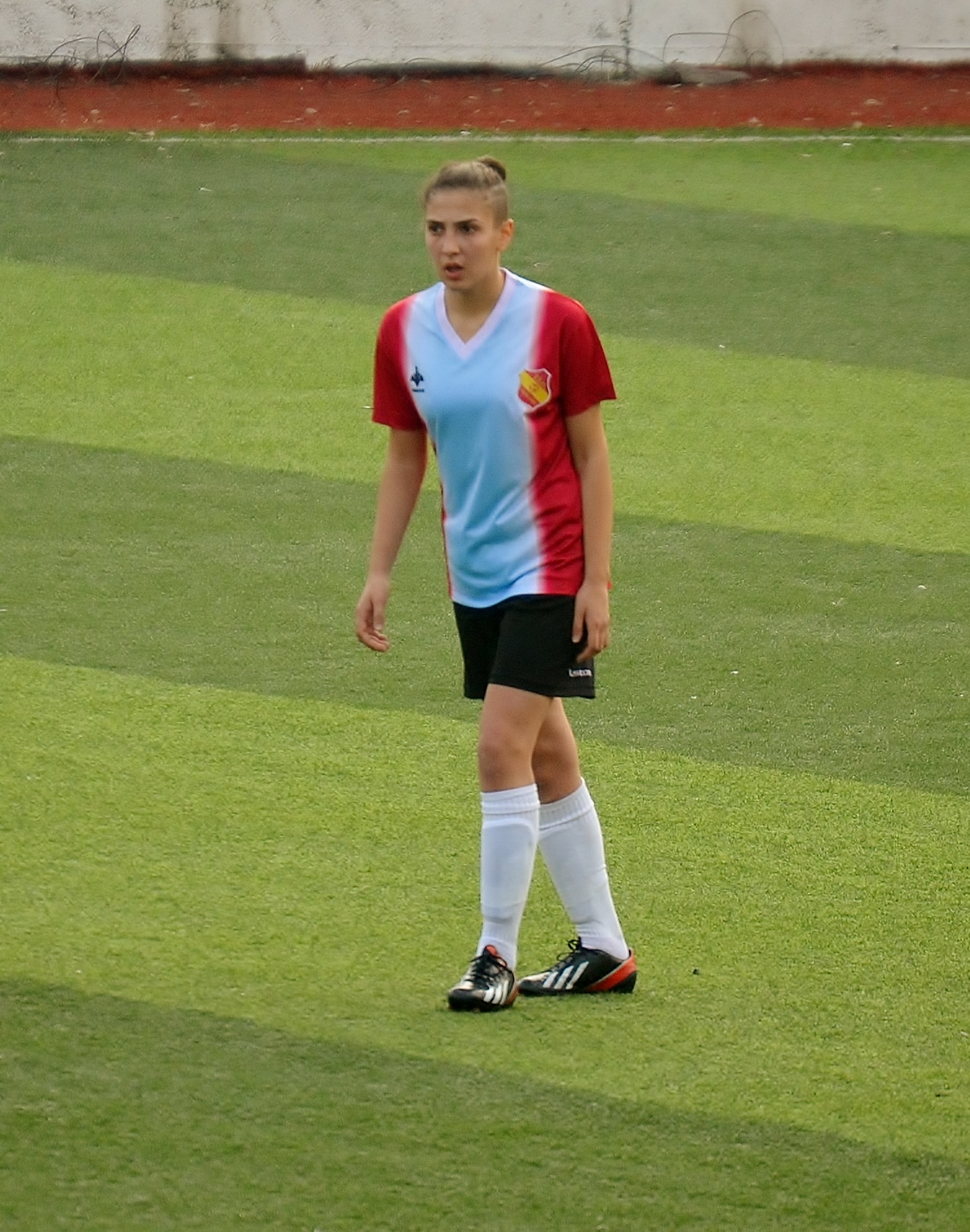
- Aybüke Arslan (December 2014)

Personal information
- Date of birth: 1 January 1994 (age 32)
- Place of birth: Trabzon, Turkey
- Position: Midfielder

Team information
- Current team: Trabzon İdmanocağı
- Number: 8

Senior career*
Years	Team	Apps	(Gls)
2008–2011	Trabzonspor	28	(5)
2011–	Trabzon İdmanocağı	37	(3)
Total		65	(8)

International career^{‡}
2009	Turkey U-17	9	(1)
2010–2012	Turkey U-19	11	(0)
- * Club domestic league appearances and goals as of 1 March 2015 ‡ National team caps and goals as of 10 May 2012

Aybüke Arslan (born 1 January 1994) is a Turkish women's football midfielder currently playing in the First League for Trabzon İdmanocağı with jersey number 8. She was a member of the Turkey U-17 and Turkey U-19 teams.

== Career ==
=== Club ===
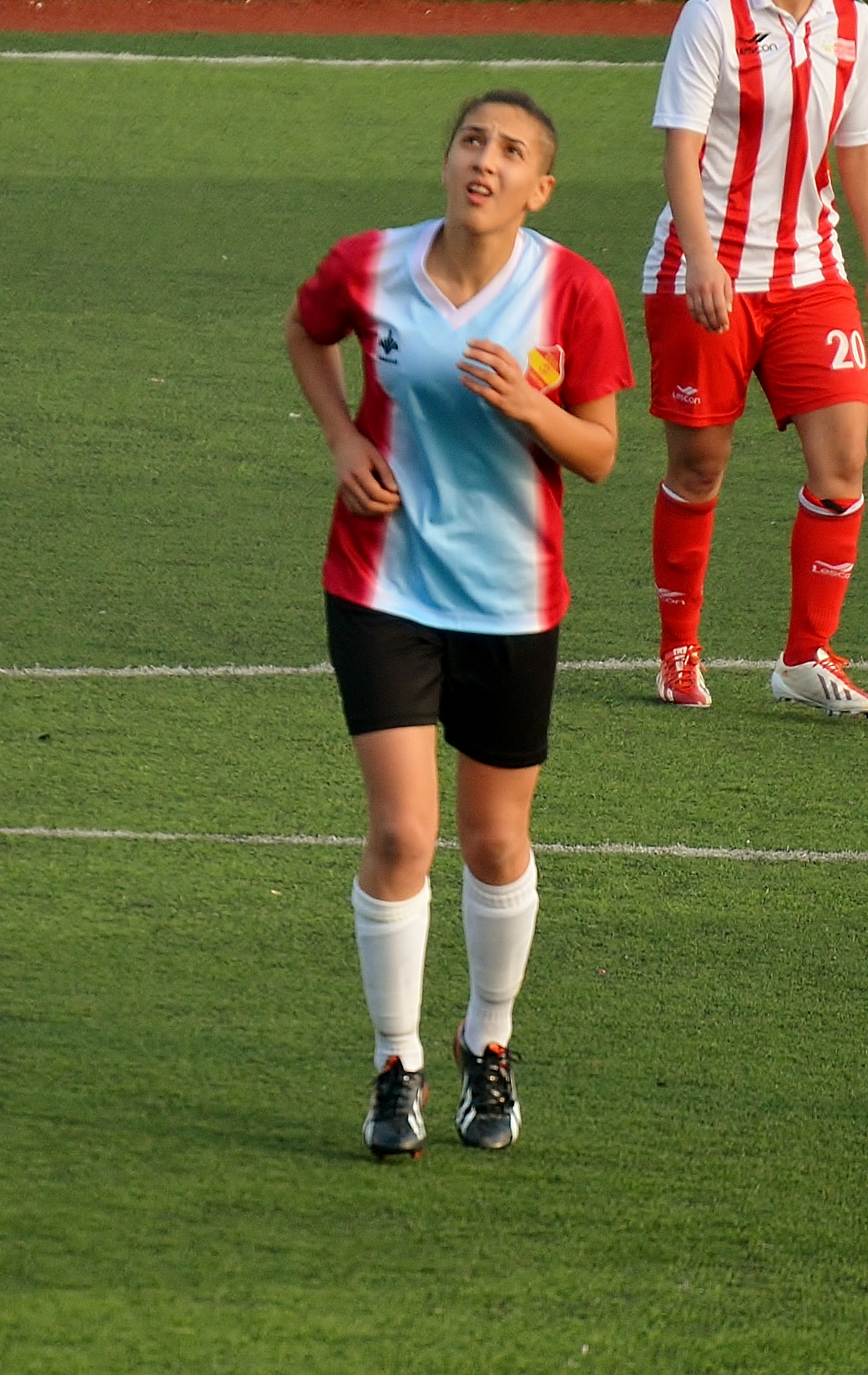
Aybüke Arslan playing for Trabzon İdmanocağı in the away match against Ataşehir Belediyespor (2014–15 season).

She received her license on 20 March 2008 for her hometown club Trabzonspor, and played three seasons in the Turkish Women's First League for them. After her first season already, she enjoyed league championship. Arslan took part at the 2009–10 UEFA Women's Champions League. She capped 28 times and scored five goals.

At the end of the 2010–11 season, Trabzonspor closed down their women's football branch. Aybüke Arslan moved then to the rival club of Trabzon İdmanocağı, where she currently plays. In 2012, she suffered a knee cruciate ligament injury during a national team training that left her out of the squad for the entire 2012–13 season. After a successful surgery, she returned to the football field again the next season.

=== International ===
Aybüke Arslan was admitted to the Turkey girls' U-17 team, and debuted in the friendly match against Bulgaria on 26 June 2009. She took part at the 2010 UEFA Women's Under-17 Championship – Group 4 matches. She capped nine times and scored one goal for the Turkey U-17 team.

She was called up to the Turkey women's U-19 team, and appeared for the first time in the friendly game against Russia on 5 February 2010. Arslan played at the 2011 UEFA Women's U-19 Championship First qualifying round – Group 9 and 2012 Kuban Spring Tournament matches. She appeared in seven matches for the Turkey women's U-19 team.

== Career statistics ==
As of 1 March 2015

Club	Season	League			Continental		National		Total	
Club	Season	Division	Apps	Goals	Apps	Goals	Apps	Goals	Apps	Goals
Trabzonspor	2008–09	First League	13	2	–	–	3	0	16	2
Trabzonspor	2009–10	First League	14	3	3	0	7	1	24	4
Trabzonspor	2010–11	First League	1	0	–	–	3	0	4	0
Trabzonspor	Total		28	5	3	0	13	1	44	6
Trabzon İdmanocağı	2011–12	First League	20	2	–	–	7	0	27	2
Trabzon İdmanocağı	2013–14	First League	4	0	–	–	0	0	4	0
Trabzon İdmanocağı	2014–15	First League	13	1	–	–	0	0	13	1
Trabzon İdmanocağı	Total		37	3	–	–	7	0	44	3
Career total			65	8	3	0	20	1	88	9

== Honours ==
Turkish Women's First League

Trabzonspor
Winners (1): 2008–09
Runners-up (1): 2009–10

Trabzon İdmanocağı
Third places (2): 2011–12, 2014–15
