= Zeliha Şimşek =

Turkish footballer and trainer

Personal information
- Full name: Zeliha Şimşek
- Date of birth: 30 April 1981 (age 45)
- Place of birth: İskenderun, Hatay, Turkey
- Height: 1.65 m (5 ft 5 in)
- Position: Midfielder

Team information
- Current team: Orduspor
- Number: 13

Senior career*
Years	Team	Apps	(Gls)
2001–2007	KTÜ	11	(0)
2007–2011	Trabzonspor	36	(0)
2011–	Orduspor	9	(0)

Managerial career
- 2008–09: Trabzonspor
- * Club domestic league appearances and goals as of May 6, 2012

Zeliha Şimşek (born April 30, 1981) is a Turkish women's footballer and trainer. Currently, she plays as a midfielder in the Turkish Women's Second League for Orduspor. She was formerly on the Trabzonspor women's team, which she co-founded in 2007. She captained and also coached the team until they folded.

== Early life ==
Zeliha Şimşek was born on April 30, 1981, in the southern Turkish city of İskenderun in Hatay Province. Following her graduation from the high school, she studied Turkish language in the Teacher Education School at the Black Sea Technical University (KTÜ) in Trabzon.

During her university years, she played football in the women's team of KTÜ receiving her license on November 20, 2001. With the suspension of women's football matches in Turkey, she had to be away for a while from active playing.

== Playing career ==
=== Club ===
Upon Turkish Football Federation's initiative, women's football in Turkey was reorganized in 2007. Soon, Şimşek co-founded, along with Trabzonspor's coordinator Özkan Sümer, a renowned former footballer and coach, women's football branch of the same club. Members of the newly established club were selected among the players of the school teams taking part in a tournament in Trabzon. Her amateur license was transferred to Trabzonspor on November 16, 2007. Trabzonspor Women's Football Club was invited to join the Turkish Women's Football Premier League in its first season of 2007–08. The next season, Şimşek's team became champion of the Premier League, which was then given a national status with ten clubs competing.

After having earned the league championship title, her club was entitled to take part at the qualifying round of the 2009–10 UEFA Women's Champions League. This was the first time a Turkish women's football team had participated in the qualifying round of the UEFA league since it was established in 2001. Trabzonspor women's team was not successful in its first international participation due to losses in the qualifying round.

== After football ==
Şimşek works as Turkish language teacher in a primary school in Trabzon. She trains her team in the evening hours due to her profession and the team members' positions as students.
