= Kifayat Osmanova =

Azerbaijani footballer (born 1987)

Personal information
- Full name: Kifayat Osmanova
- Date of birth: 22 April 1987 (age 39)
- Place of birth: Baku, Azerbaijan
- Position: Midfielder

Senior career*
Years	Team	Apps	(Gls)
- Gömrükçü Baku
- Ruslan-93

International career^{‡}
2004	Azerbaijan U19	1	(0)
2010	Azerbaijan	1	(0)
- * Club domestic league appearances and goals ‡ National team caps and goals as of 19 June 2010

Kifayat Osmanova (Azerbaijani: Kifayət Osmanova; born 22 April 1987) is an Azerbaijani former footballer who played as a midfielder. She has been a member of the Azerbaijan women's national team.
