= Viravul =

- Municipality
- Location within Azerbaijan
- Coordinates: 38°48′38″N 48°45′52″E
- Country: Azerbaijan
- Rayon: Lankaran

Population
  - Total: 3,453
- Time zone: UTC+4 (AZT)
  - Summer (DST): UTC+5 (AZT)

Viravul (also, Veravul’) is a village and municipality in the Lankaran Rayon of Azerbaijan. It has a population of 3,453.
