= Gamze Bezan =

Turkish women's football midfielder

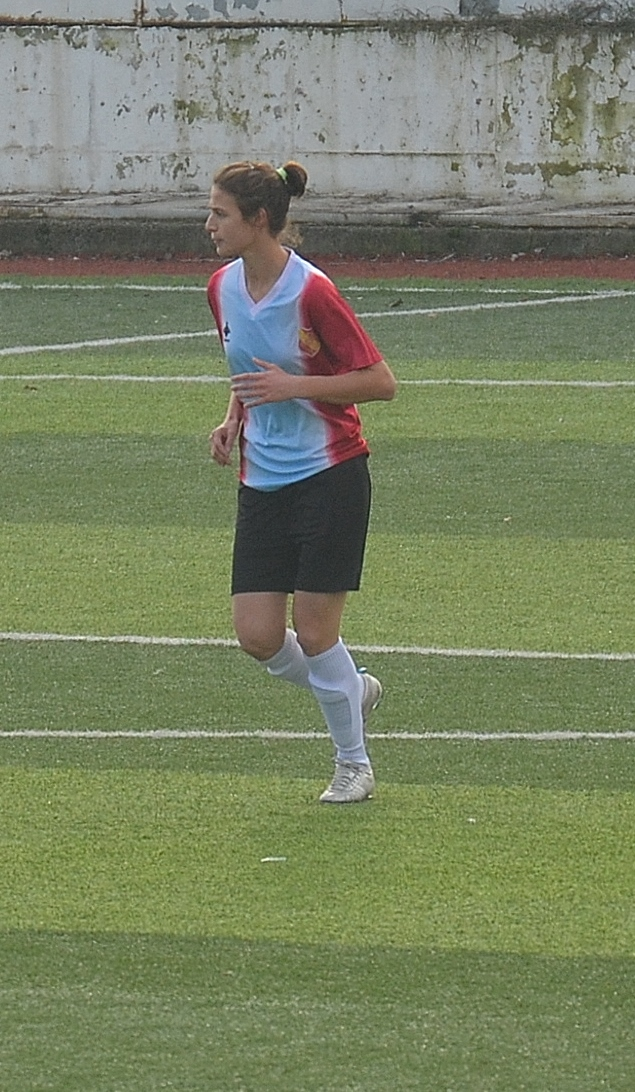
- Gamze Bezan for Trabzonspor (women) (2014–15 season)

Personal information
- Date of birth: 31 August 1994 (age 32)
- Place of birth: Trabzon, Turkey
- Position: Midfielder

Team information
- Current team: İlkadım Belediyespor
- Number: 22

Senior career*
Years	Team	Apps	(Gls)
2009–2011	Trabzonspor	25	(3)
2011–2016	Trabzon İdmanocağı	80	(21)
2016–2017	İlkadım Belediyespor	22	(1)
Total		127	(25)

International career^{‡}
2010	Turkey U-17	2	(0)
- * Club domestic league appearances and goals as of 11 June 2017 ‡ National team caps and goals as of 8 October 2010

Gamze Bezan (born 31 August 1994) is a Turkish women's football midfielder, who last played in the First League for İlkadım Belediyesi with jersey number 22. In 2010, she played for the Turkish girls' national U-17 team.

She is studying physical education and sports in Gümüşhane University.

== Career ==
=== Club ===
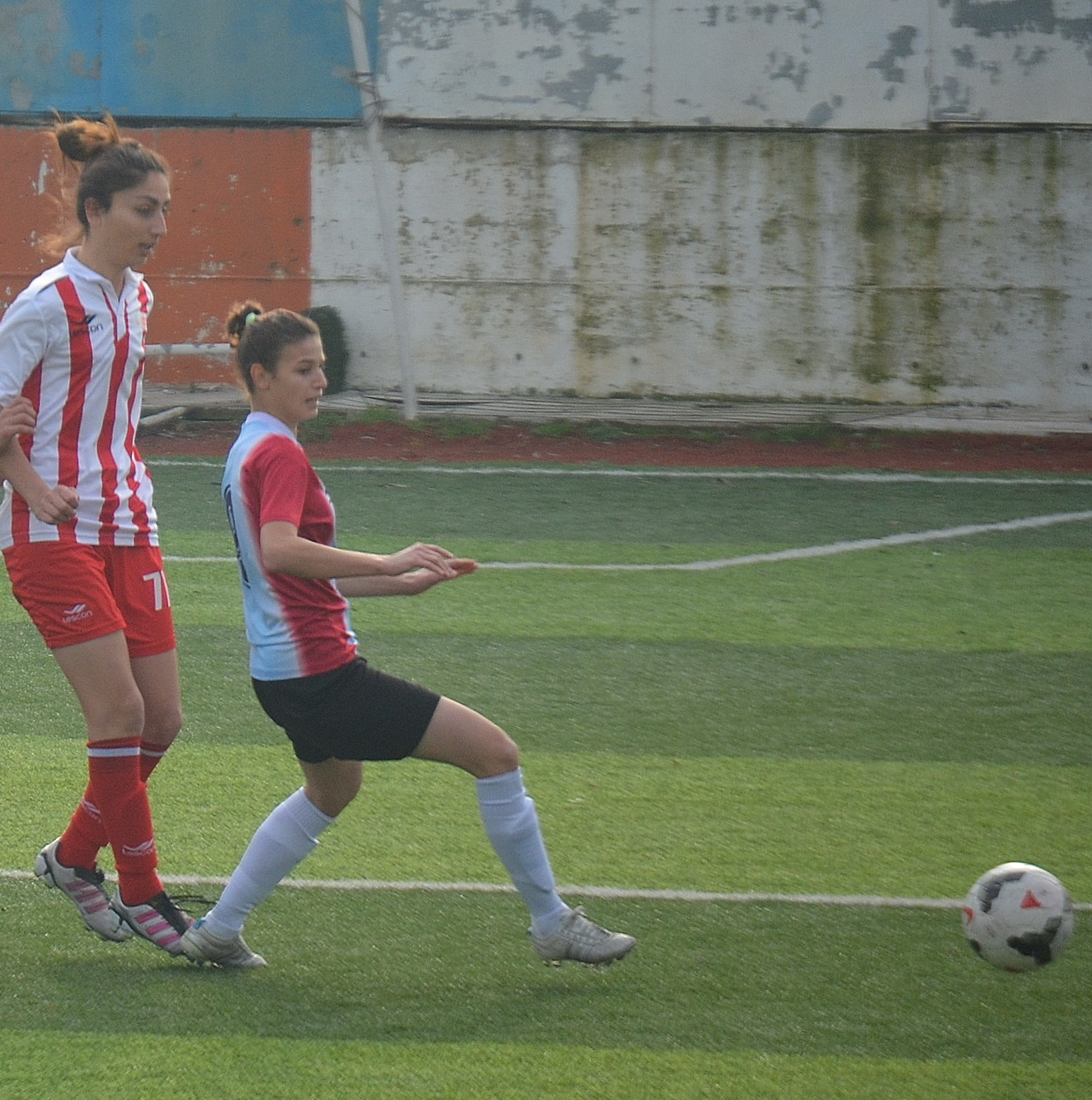
Gamze Bezan (right) playing for Trabzon İdmanocağı in the away match of the 2014–15 season against Ataşehir Belediyespor.

Gamze Bezan received her license on 10 April 2008 for her hometown club Trabzonspor, where she played until the end of the 2010–11 season capping 25 times and scoring 3 goals. After dissolution of the women's football branch of the club, she transferred to Trabzon İdmanocağı, another local women's club.

Following the 2010–11 season, she was honored with the title "Best Women's Footballer of Trabzonspor" bestowed by the fans of the club.

After playing five seasons for her hometown club, she transferred to İlkadım Belediyesi of Samsun in the 2016–17 season.

=== International ===
Bezan was admitted to the Turkey girls' U-17 team, and debuted in the 2011 UEFA Women's Under-17 Championship – Group 6 match against England on 3 October 2010. She cappen twice for the Turkey U-17 nationals.

She was called up to the Turkey women's U-19 team for the first time in 2011. Bezan was elected again in 2012 to play at the 2013 UEFA Women's U-19 Championship First qualifying round matches. However, she did not find a place in the squad later on.

== Career statistics ==
As of 11 June 2017.

Club	Season	League			Continental		National		Total	
Club	Season	Division	Apps	Goals	Apps	Goals	Apps	Goals	Apps	Goals
Eskişehirspor	2009–10	First League	6	0	–	–	0	0	6	0
Eskişehirspor	2010–11	First League	19	3	–	–	2	0	21	3
Eskişehirspor	Total		25	3	–	–	2	0	27	3
Trabzon İdmanocağı	2011–12	First League	21	2	–	–	0	0	21	2
Trabzon İdmanocağı	2012–13	First League	17	5	–	–	0	0	17	5
Trabzon İdmanocağı	2013–14	First League	13	2	–	–	0	0	13	2
Trabzon İdmanocağı	2014–15	First League	16	5	–	–	0	0	16	5
Trabzon İdmanocağı	2015–16	First League	13	7	–	–	0	0	13	7
Trabzon İdmanocağı	Total		80	21	–	–	0	0	80	21
İlkadım Belediyespor	2016–17	First League	22	1	–	–	0	0	22	1
İlkadım Belediyespor	Total		22	1	–	–	0	0	22	1
Career total			127	25	–	–	2	0	129	25

== Honours ==
Turkish Women's First League

Trabzon İdmanocağı
Third places (3): 2011–12, 2014–15, 2015–16
