= Trabzonspor (women's football) =

Turkish women's association football club

- Full name: Trabzonspor Kulübü Kadın Futbol Takımı
- Nicknames: Bordo-Mavililer (Maroon-Blues); Karadeniz Firtinasi (The Black Sea Storm)
- Founded: 16 October 2007; 19 years ago 20 September 2021; 5 years ago
- Ground: Ahmet Suat Özyazıcı Stadium
- Capacity: 1,188
- President: Ahmet Ağaoğlu
- Head coach: Özlem Önder
- League: Turkish Women's Football Super League
- 2024–25: 5th of 14
- Website: https://www.trabzonspor.org.tr/tr

Trabzonspor Club Women's Football Team (Turkish: Trabzonspor Kulübü Kadın Futbol Takımı) is the women's football team of Trabzonspor in Trabzon, Turkey. It was established on 16 October 2007.

Right after its foundation, the team was invited to join the Turkish Women's Football Super League. However, the league was cancelled in 2003 but re-established for the 2007–08 season. Trabzonspor were the champions in the 2008–09 season, which was the second year of the league.

== History ==
=== Foundation ===
The first women's football team in Trabzon was of the Karadeniz Teknik Üniversitesi (KTÜ) formed in 2001. Following this initiative, another football club in Trabzon, İdmanocağı founded its women's team basing it on the squad of Trabzon High School. However, due to inadequate interest, women's football in Trabzon did not improve.

In 2007, former KTÜ player Zeliha Şimşek and Trabzonspor's coordinator Özkan Sümer formed the team. Using their previous experiences where they had played a leading role in the foundation of a women's team within Trabzonspor, they formed the team in six weeks before the beginning of the league season. The Trabzonspor women's team competed in the first year of the women's league along with the other women's team in Trabzon, İdmanocağı.

=== Later years ===
The team played its first league match against İdmanocağı on November 18, 2007 at its home stadium Mehmet Ali Yılmaz Stadium and won by 2–0. However, Trabzonspor was not so successful in later matches to get out of Group C. Gazi Üniversitesispor from Ankara, which played in the same group, became champion in the 2007–08 season. With the 2008–09 season, the structure of the women's league was modified and it gained national status. Trabzonspor competed in the restructured league of ten teams and gained the champion's title with 45 points in 18 games defeating Cengiz Topelspor of Mersin by 2–0 in the last match played away.

With this achievement, Trabzonspor became the only Turkish club which was champion of both the men's and women's premier leagues.

=== Re-establishment ===
The women's football team of the club was re-established after the Turkish Football Federation formed the Turkish Women's Football Super League replacing Turkish Women's First Football League in 2021, and appealed to the major men's football clubs in the Süper Lig to participate in the women's football. The team is one of the eight new formed teams, which joined the 2021–22 Turkish Women's Football Super League for the first time.

== Statistics ==
As of 5 October 2025

Season	League	Pos.	Pld	W	D	L	GF	GA	GD	Pts
2007–08	Women's League – Div. 2 Gr. C	3	12	7	2	3	44	14	+30	23
2008–09	First League	1	18	15	0	3	41	14	+27	45
2009–10	First League	2	18	15	0	3	63	14	+49	45
2010–11	First League	5	22	13	4	5	81	32	+49	32
2021–22	Super League Gr. B	8	22	7	3	12	28	33	-5	24
2022–23	Super League Gr. B	8	18	6	2	10	32	39	-7	20
2022–23	Play-outs	Remained	4	3	0	1	10	1	+9	9
2023–24	Super League	11	30	9	6	15	34	44	-10	33
2024–25	Super League	5	26	15	3	8	64	23	+41	48
2025–26	Super League	6	3 (^{1})	2	0	1	5	2	+3	6
Green marks a season followed by promotion, red a season followed by relegation.

- (^{1}): Season in progress

== International competitions ==
Trabzonspor was entitled to participate in the qualifying round of the 2009–10 UEFA Women's Champions League. This was the first time a Turkish women's football team had participated in the qualifying round of the UEFA league since it was established in 2001.

The team won its first match in the Group D against ŽNK Krka from Slovenia by 2–0, however lost the following matches to Italy's Torres Calcio Femminile by 0–9 and to Slovan Duslo Šaľa from Slovakia by 1–2. Trabzonspor women's team failed to participate in the 2009–2010 UEFA Champions League.

Event	Stage	Date	Venue	Opponent	Result	Scorers
2009–10 UEFA Champions League	QR; Group D 3rd	Jul 30, 2009	Slovenia, Krško	(Slovenia) ŽNK Krka	W 2–0	Tchkonia, Önder
2009–10 UEFA Champions League	QR; Group D 3rd	Aug 1, 2009	Slovenia, Krško	(Italy) ASD Torres Calcio	L 0–9	
2009–10 UEFA Champions League	QR; Group D 3rd	Aug 4, 2010	Slovenia, Krško	(Slovakia) FK Slovan Duslo Šaľa	L 1–2	Kalyoncu

=== Ranking history ===
Season	Rank	Points	Ref.
2009–10	91 ▲	0.750	
2010–11	84 ▲	1.495	
2011–12	97 ▼	1.660	
2012–13	93 ▲	1.990	
2013–14	86 ▲	4.300	

== Achievements ==
- Turkish Women's Football Premier League:
  - Winners (1): 2008–09
  - Runners-up (2): 2009–10, 2025-26

== Current squad ==
As of 10 July 2026

- Head coach: (Turkey) Hatice Bahar Özgüvenç

Note: Flags indicate national team as defined under FIFA eligibility rules; some limited exceptions apply. Players may hold more than one non-FIFA nationality.

No.	Pos.	Nation	Player
21	GK	TUR	Fatma Şahin
99	GK	TUR	Gamze Nur Yaman
2	DF	TUR	Berna Yeniçeri
3	DF	TUR	Rabia Küçük
5	DF	TUR	Sema Polat
13	DF	TUR	Sare Öztürk
4	MF	GER	Paula Ruess
6	MF	TUR	Nihal Saraç
8	MF	KOS	Fatlinda Ramaj
10	MF	KOS	Donjeta Halilaj
16	MF	NGR	Chioma Olise

No.	Pos.	Nation	Player
20	MF	ALG	Amira Ould Braham
22	MF	TUR	Rabiya İsgi
23	MF	TUR	Birgül Sadıkoğlu
28	MF	TUR	Fatma Kara
36	MF	TUR	Dilan Bora
80	MF	TAN	Diana Msewa
7	FW	KOS	Kaltrina Biqkaj
17	FW	ALB	Armela Tukaj
19	FW	USA	Jaylen Crim
61	FW	ITA	Asia Bragonzi

== Notable former players ==
- (Albania) Valentina Troka (2024–2025)
- (Austria) Andrea Gurtner (2024–2025)
- (Azerbaijan) Nargiz Hajiyeva (2022–2023)
- (Azerbaijan) Aytaj Sharifova (2022–2024)
- (Bosnia and Herzegovina) Aida Hadžić (2024–2025)
- (Republic of the Congo) Grâce Mfwamba (2022–2024)
- (Cameroon) Rose Bella (2021–2022)
- (Georgia (country)) Tatiana Matveeva (2008–2011)
- (Georgia (country)) Kristina Shadoba (2008–2011)
- (Georgia (country)) Khatia Tchkonia (2009–2010)
- (Ghana) Princella Adubea (2024–2025)
- (Ghana) Sonia Opoku (2022)
- (Kazakhstan) Shokhista Khojasheva (2022)
- (Nigeria) Ijeoma Queenth Daniels (2022–)
- (Kosovo) Kaltrina Biqkaj (2024–)
- (Kosovo) Lumbardha Misini (2024–2025)
- (Nigeria) Ijeoma Queenth Daniels (2022–2023)
- (Turkey) Nagehan Akşan (2008–2010)
- (Turkey) Aybüke Arslan (2008–2011)
- (Turkey) Çiğdem Belci (2009–2010)
- (Turkey) Gamze Bezan (2009–2011)
- (Turkey) Eylül Elgalp (2010–2011)
- (Turkey) Göknur Güleryüz (2021–2022)
- (Turkey) Meryem Küçükbirinci (2021-2024)
- (Turkey) Zeliha Şimşek (2007–2011)
- (Turkey) Cansu Yağ (2010–2011)
- (Uzbekistan) Kamila Zaripova (2021–2022)
- (Uzbekistan) Setora Takaboeva (2021–2022)
- (Uzbekistan) Diyorakhon Khabibullaeva (2024)

== Kit history ==
2009–10 home	2009–10 away	2021–22 home	2021–22 away	2021–22 alt	2023–24 home
