= Corbeil =

Corbeil may refer to:

== Places ==
- Corbeil, Ontario, Canada
- Corbeil, Marne, a commune in the Marne département in north-eastern France
- Corbeil-Cerf, a commune in the département of Oise in northern France
- Corbeil-Essonnes, a commune in the southern suburbs of Paris, France
  - Corbeil Cathedral, superseded by the cathedral at Évry
  - Roman Catholic Diocese of Évry–Corbeil-Essonnes
- Saint-Germain-lès-Corbeil, a commune in the Essonne département in northern France

== People ==
- Corbeil (surname)
- Gilles de Corbeil (c. 1140-before 1225), French physician, teacher and poet
- Isaac ben Joseph of Corbeil (13th century), French rabbi and tosefist
- Peter of Corbeil (died 1222), preacher and canon of Nôtre Dame de Paris
- William de Corbeil (c. 1070-1136), archbishop of Canterbury

== Historical events ==
- Treaty of Corbeil (1258) between France and Aragon
- Treaty of Corbeil (1326) between France and Scotland

== Other ==
- Corbeil Buses, a school bus manufacturer in Kansas, USA
- Corbeil XIII, a Rugby League club in Corbeil-Essonnes, France
