= List of works by Henri Chapu =

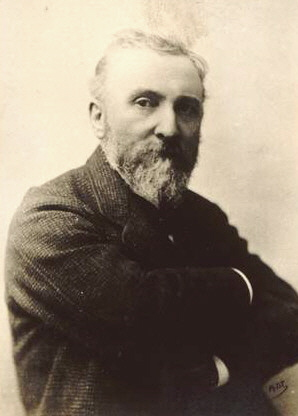
Henri Chapu

Henri Chapu (1833–1891) was a French sculptor.

Chapu was born in Le Mée-sur-Seine on 30 September 1833. He trained at the École Gratuite de Dessin as a tapestry maker. In 1849 his successes led him to the École des Beaux-Arts, Paris, where he became a pupil of James Pradier, François Duret and Léon Cogniet. In 1855 he won the Prix de Rome for sculpture with the relief "Cleobis and Biton". He completed his education at the Académie de France in Rome, remaining there until 1861. While there, he worked in the Villa Médicis. During the period of the Second Empire and the Third Republic, Chapu worked on the sculptural decoration of many buildings and public monuments, including the decoration of the façade of the Au Printemps store, the Théâtre de l'Opéra, and the gardens of the Château de Chantilly. Many of Chapu's works take the form of médallions and he is credited with having led a new wave of interest in this medium.

In 1867 Chapu was made a chevalier of the Légion d'honneur, in recognition of his works for the Éxposition Universelle of that year, and in 1880 he was elected to the Academie des Beaux-Arts. He died on 21 April 1891 and is buried in Mée-sur-Seine's cemetery.

== Key ==
Meaning
Major works in Paris.
Major works outside of Paris.
Funerary sculptures.
Works shown in museums.

== Works ==
Name	Location	Photograph	Date	Notes
"Jeanne d'Arc à Domrémy"	Musée d'Orsay		1870–72	Chapu's "Jeanne d'Arc à Domrémy", depicting Joan of Arc listening to her "voices," is one of the best-known representations of this French heroine and arguably Chapu's best-known work. Chapu depicts Joan as a simple shepherdess from Lorraine listening to the voices asking her to help the king to liberate the kingdom. A version of this work in plaster was presented to the Paris Salon in 1870, and in 1872 a version was produced in marble. Chapu's "Jeanne d'Arc à Domrémy" was produced in various sizes and materials. The version shown is marble. One version of Chapu's work can be seen in Melun's square Jeanne d'Arc. The marble statue was executed by a sculptor called Saulot who replicated Chapu's original work. Chapu's depiction of Joan listening to her "voices" struck a particular chord with the people of Melun as it was in 1429 when Joan visited the recently liberated Melun to inspect its defences, that her "voices" warned her that she would soon be taken prisoner.
"Piété filiale de Cleobis et Biton"	École Nationale Supérieure des Beaux-Arts	—	—	This bas-relief won Chapu the Prix de Rome for sculpture in 1855.
Danseuse à l'Éventail	Hotel Pereire in Paris	—	1882	Ordered for the vestibule of the hotel owned by the Pereire brothers in Paris another marble version was also ordered by Alphonse de Rothschild for his hotel in Paris' rue Sain. Exhibited at the 1890 Paris Salon, there are also copies of this work in the Château de Ferrières and the Musée Henri Chapu.
Bust of Alexandre Dumas Père	Comédie-Française	—	1876	Chapu work in marble.
Statue of Saint Joseph	Église Saint Augustin in Paris	—	1876	Bronze Statue.
"Les Lettres"	Sorbonne	—	—	The north façade of the Sorbonne (the principal entrance) has statues by Chapu, Mercié, Cordonnier, Marqueste, and Lefeuvre. The two main statues over that entrance are an allegorical representation of the "Sciences" by Antonin Mercié and Chapu's "Literature"-("Les Lettres)
"L'art mécanique"	Tribunal de Commerce	—	1865	The composition "Maritime Commerce" for the Tribunal de Commerce's first floor landing.
Monument to Antoine Pierre Berryer	Palais de Justice	—	1879	Two compositions entitled "L'Eloquence" and "La Fidélité" were executed by Chapu to decorate the monument to Antoine Pierre Berryer in the Palais de Justice.
"La Ville de Beauvais"	Gare du Nord	—	1861	Chapu's 1861 allegorical depiction of Beauvais is one of many statues which decorate the front of Paris' Gare du Nord. The original plaster model is held in the Musée Henri Chapu. Chapu's statue is one of a series of 12, which represent the 12 destinations that were served by the Chemin de Fer du Nord: Amiens, Arras, Beauvais, Calais, Cambrai, Douai, Dunkerque, Laon, Lille, Rouen, Saint-Quentin and Valenciennes.
Statue of Urbain Le Verrier	Observatoire de Paris.		1889	Statue of Urbain Le Verrier, the French astronomer and mathematician, who discovered the planet Neptune in 1846, is located in the courtyard of the Observatoire de Paris. Dedicated on 27 June 1889, Chapu added two reliefs to the statue's pedestal, "l'Astronomie" and "la Météorologie". Plaster models of these reliefs and of Le Verrier are held in the Musée Henri Chapu, whilst in the Musée de Melun one can see some original drawings of these compositions.
"La Moisson"	Petit Palais	—	1883	A plaster version is in the Petit Palais in Paris. The marble version of the work is located in the dining room of the Paris Hôtel de Ville.
"La Cantate"	Opéra Garnier		1869	Located on the facade of the Opéra Garnier in Paris. Chapu's designs for the work are held in Melun's municipal museum.
"Four Seasons"	Au Printemps		—	Chapu was commissioned to execute allegorical statues depicting the four seasons on the building's facade, for Paul Sédille's redesign of the department store after it had been badly damaged by fire. The original plaster versions of Le Printemps and the other three seasons are held in the Musée Henri Chapu.
"Painting"	The Palais Galliera	—	—	This building was commissioned from architect Léon Ginain by Maria Brignole Sale De Ferrari, Duchesse de Galliera, as a setting for her extensive art collection. There are many sculptures to be seen here, including Chapu's allegorical composition "Painting", which is grouped with "Architecture" by Jules Thomas and "Sculpture" by Pierre Cavelier.
Various Medallions & Sculptures	Hotel Sédille	—	—	For this hotel in Paris Chapu executed medallions depicting "La Peinture", "La Musique", L'Architecture", "La Poesie" and "La Sculpture". There are also busts in the hotel by Chapu of Jules Sédille, Paul Sédille and Madeleine Sédille.
Statue of Saint Germain l'Auxerrois and Saint Genevieve	Arras Cathedral	—	1874-1878	In white marble, this statue is one of several positioned along the nave and commissioned by the French State between 1874 and 1878. Chapu's statue was originally in the Panthéon and moved to the cathedral in 1934.
Monument aux morts de 1870	Beaune cemetery, Beaune	—	1884	In 1884 it was decided that the proposed monument to those men of Beaune who lost their lives in 1870 should have as its centre-piece Chapu's composition "la Jeunesse". It was dedicated on 27 September 1896, and in 1960 the monument was moved to its current position in front of Beaune's cemetery.
Statues of Pluto and Proserpine	Chateau de Chantilly		1885	These marble statues were ordered by the Duke of Aumale for the grounds of the Chateau de Chantilly. (Photo of Pluto located in gallery, below)
Monument to Jean-François Millet	Cherbourg-en-Cotentin		1892	This monument to Jean-François Millet is located in a public garden in Cherbourg. The statue and monument were completed by sculptor Jean-Ernest Bouteiller after Chapu's death. Bouteiller slightly redesigned Chapu's concept. (Additional photograph located in gallery, below)
Statue of Eugène Schneider the First	Le Creusot		1879	There are several statues in Le Creusot dedicated to members of the Schneider family who founded and ran the Schneider iron and steel company. The first statue is dedicated to the organisation's founder Eugène Schneider. Designed by Paul Sédille and sculpted by Henri Chapu, the bronze statue was dedicated on 10 August 1879 in the presence of Ferdinand de Lesseps. Eugène Schneider wears a cape and carries a cane. A woman stands before the pedestal (she is Chapu's composition "la Reconnaissance") and points Schneider out to her son, a young blacksmith. The boy is shirtless, wears clogs and carried a bucket. There is a local joke that the woman is saying to her son-"Look my son. That's the man who has taken the shirt of your back!"
"La Reconnaissance"	Le Creusot	—	1879	This composition forms part of the monument to Eugène Schneider (see listing above). The Musée Henri Chapu holds the plaster model.
Bust of Monseigneur Félix Dupanloup	Église Saint-Pierre du Martroi in Orléans	—	1888	Located in the Église Saint-Pierre du Martroi in Orleans.
"Chemin de Croix"	Rambluzin-et-Benoite-Vaux	—	1890-95	In 1890 Chapu had the idea of creating a "chemin de croix" for Rambluzin-et-Benoite-Vaux in the Meuse, which had long been a place of pilgrimage. Chapu's concept was to have 14 monoliths each of a height of 20 metres made from Euville stone. Each would have a suitable bas-relief depicting one of the stations of the Cross. Chapu made models in his studio and had created a maquette for the first bas-relief just before his death. After Chapu's death, Désiré Fosse, a member of his studio, completed the project. On 26 September 1895, the work was blessed by the Bishop of Verdun before 12,000 pilgrims.
Saint-Yrieix-sous-Aixe War Memorial	Saint-Yrieix-sous-Aixe	—	1871	Dedicated to the men of Saint-Yrieix-sous-Aixe killed in the two world wars, the original memorial in Compeix granite was sculpted by Félix Honorat in 1923. It contains Chapu's bronze, "la jeunesse" which dates back to 1871, which is a smaller version of the bronze used on the monument in the l'école des Beaux-Arts in Paris' "cour des Mûriers", dedicated to the young artists killed in the Battle of Buzenval. The monument takes the form of an obelisk and Félix Honorat decorated this with depictions of a helmet, some laurel leaves and a sword.
Monument to Jean Cousin	Sens	—	—	Located in a public garden in Sens in the Yonne. Jean Cousin l'Ancien came from Soucy near Sens and was an accomplished painter, sculptor, etcher, engraver, and geometrician. Chapu's composition depicts Cousin working on a small model.
Bust of Joseph de Carayon La Tour	Virelade		1889	Bronze bust can be seen in Virelade in the Gironde. In the Franco-Prussian war, Joseph de Carayon La Tour led the 3rd battalion of the Gironde Guard. He took part in the battle of Nuits-Saint-Georges.
Medallion depicting the painters Millet and Rousseau	Forest of Fontainebleau		—	The village of Barbizon was where the landscape painters known as the "Barbizon School" lived and worked during the middle of the 19th century. The group included Camille Corot, Jean-François Millet, Narcisse Diaz de la Peña, and Théodore Rousseau. The Fontainebleau forest contains many sandstone rocks and on one of these is a Chapu bronze medallion depicting profiles of Millet and Rousseau.
"Vierge à L'Enfant"	Église Notre-Dame de la Nativité, Seine-et-Marne		1892	This church is located in the rue de l’Église in Mee-sur-Seine in Seine-et-Marne. Chapu's "Vierge à L'Enfant" can be seen here as well as statues of St Jean and St Louis de Gonzaque, these being smaller versions of Chapu's original statues in the Saint-Étienne-du-Mont church in Paris. Above the church's main altar is Chapu's white marble bas-relief "Le Christ mort entre deux anges" which Chapu executed in 1892 based on the plaster version he had produced while in Rome in 1856.
Monument to the Galignani Brothers	Corbeil	—	—	Chapu executed a monument to the Galignani brothers in Corbeil. The Galignani brothers were publishers operating out of Paris. They were seen as local benefactors in Corbeil having funded the town's hospital, old people's home and orphanage.
Tomb of Comtesse Marie Sophie Catherine de Flavigny	Père Lachaise cemetery, Paris		1876	Commissioned to create a sculpture for the grave of the German writer who wrote under the name of Daniel Stern, Chapu created a bas-relief entitled "La Pensée" which depicts a young woman, seated and looking thoughtfully to the heavens. To her left is a bust of Goëthe and at the top is a medallion depicting the countess herself. The tomb is located in Pere Lachaise's Division 54.
Monument at the grave site of the Morgan family	Springfield Cemetery, Massachusetts		late 19th century	The Morgan family monument, located in Springfield Cemetery (Springfield, Massachusetts), includes a bronze bas-relief of "La Pensée". In this version, the head of Athena, the goddess of wisdom, can be seen over the seated maiden's left shoulder.
Tomb of Adolphe Thiers	Père Lachaise cemetery, Paris		—	This tomb of the French architect Adolphe Thiers has Chapu's marble relief representing "Patriotisme". The tomb is located in the cemetery's Division 55.
The tomb of Ferdinand Barbedienne	Père Lachaise cemetery, Paris		1892	Chapu executed a bust of Barbedienne for his tomb in Père-Lachaise and Alfred Boucher executed the three statues "L'Inspiration", "Le Travail" and "La Petite Boucher". The works were installed in 1892. Both Chapu's bust and Boucher's three compositions are in bronze. Many of Chapu's works were cast in bronze by the Barbedienne foundry.
"Le Génie de l'Immortalité"	Père Lachaise cemetery, Paris		—	Also in the Cimetière du Père Lachaise, Division 72, is Chapu's sculpture on the grave of Jean Ernest Reynaud the French philosopher. The composition which is the tomb's centre-piece is "Le Génie de l'Immortalité".
Tomb of Clara Peabody	Père Lachaise cemetery, Paris		1884	Clara Peabody was the widow of Edward Bancroft of Boston. She had been born in Milford, Hillsborough, New Hampshire and died in Paris in 1882. A Chapu sculpture decorates her tomb.
Memorial commemorating the 1870-71 war	Père Lachaise cemetery, Paris		1873	This memorial is located in Division 64 of the Cimetière du Père Lachaise in Paris. Chapu executed bronzes depicting a National guardsman, a marine, an artilleryman and an infantryman (see individual statues below in gallery).
Tomb of the Duchess of Orléans	Chapelle royale de Dreux, Dreux		—	The Royal Chapel of Dreux (Chapelle royale de Dreux) is the traditional burial place of members of the House of Orléans. The tombs of Ferdinand-Philippe d'Orléans (1814–1842) and his wife Hélène de Mecklembourg-Schwerin (1814–1858), the Duke and Duchess of Orléans, are in the chapel. Ferdinand was sculpted by Pierre Loison and Chapu executed the figure of Hélène, depicting her as appearing to look over to her husband. The plaster model for Chapu's sculpture for the tomb of the Duchess of Orléans is held in the Musée Henri Chapu.
The tomb of Mlle Labiche	Béville-le-Comte cemetery in Eure-et-Loire	—	—	Chapu completed the sculptural work for this tomb, designed by the architect Henri Paul Nénot.
Statue of Cardinal Henri de Bonnechose	Rouen Cathedral		1893	This Chapu composition was first seen by the public when it was shown at the 1891 Paris Salon. After its showing at the 1891 Salon it was placed in the cathedral. Chapu died before completing the entire cappa-magna, Edmond Bonet produced a suitable pedestal and finally on 23 March 1893 the dedication took place. The original plaster version of this composition can be seen in the Musée Chapu. Originally there was a large bronze statue by Carlus representing "Christian France" as part of the monument, positioned by the side of the pedestal and looking up to the Cardinal, but after the war only the praying figure of the Cardinal was retained and this was placed at the entrance to the cathedral's chapel of the Virgin. In the link given here we can see an early photograph of the monument with the Carlus bronze intact
The tomb of Léon Cogniet	—		—	The tomb of this French painter has a medallion by Chapu.
Tomb of Ernest Picard	—		—	A relief portrait of Picard for the Picard family tomb.
Tomb of Juan Martin de Ycaza	Père Lachaise cemetery, Paris		—	A bas-relief for the tomb of Juan Martin de Ycaza. The tomb is located in Père-Lachaise's Division 92.
Tomb of Auguste Axenfeld	Montparnasse	—	—	Axenfeld was awarded two medals for his work during the Paris cholera outbreaks of 1849 and 1854. Chapu sculpted a medallion for this Odessa-born doctor of medicine's tomb in the Montparnasse cemetery.
Tomb of Dupanloup	Orléans Cathedral		1888	Chapu sculpted the monument to Monseigneur Dupanloup, Bishop of Orléans from 1849 to 1878 in the Cathedral Sainte-Croix in Orléans. (Additional photo in gallery, below).
Tomb of Monseigneur Augustin David	Saint-Étienne cathedral in Saint-Brieuc	—	—	Chapu executed the sculpture on the tomb of Monseigneur Augustin David for the façade of Saint-Étienne cathedral in Saint-Brieuc.
Tomb of Félicien David	Saint-Germain-en-Laye	—	—	A marble bas-relief, called "Le Desert" after one of David's compositions, adorns the tomb of this French composer, buried in Le Pecq (now known as Saint-Germain-en-Laye) cemetery.
"La Jeunesse"	École des Beaux Arts, Paris		1871	As stated in a previous entry, the composition "La Jeunesse" was used as the centerpiece for the monument remembering the painter Henri Regnault and the French students killed in the Franco-Prussian war.
"L'Affection Mutuelle"	Musée Henri Chapu in Le Mée-sur-Seine	—	—	Plaster Work
"Christ aux Anges"	Musée Henri Chapu in Le Mée-sur-Seine	—	1857	Bas-relief
"Mercure inventant le Caducée"	Musée d'Orsay in Paris	—	1860	This marble composition was based on a work in plaster completed by Chapu while at Rome's Villa Médicis.
"La Sécurité"	Musée d'Orsay in Paris	—	1872	A terracotta work, part of a group executed for the police station at Ivry sur Seine and now held in store by the Paris authorities. Part of the overall composition involving a child on its knees was produced as a limited edition entitled "Moise".
Bust of Henri Hecht	Musée d'Orsay in Paris	—	1873	Terracotta bust of Henri Hecht.
"La Jeunesse"	Musée d'Orsay in Paris	—	1875	A bronze cast at the Maison Barbedienne. One of Chapu's best-known compositions, the marble version is the centerpiece of the Monument to Henri Regnault at the École nationale supérieure des Beaux-Arts in Paris (see above entry). Plaster versions can be seen in the Angers municipal museum and in the Ny Carlsberg Glyptotek in Copenhagen.
Memorial to Gustave Flaubert	Musée Flaubert in Rouen		1890	In the garden of this small museum in Rouen one can see Chapu's monument to Gustave Flaubert. Originally when completed in 1890 it had been placed on the façade of Rouen's Musée des Beaux-Arts. Photograph courtesy Adrian Clark.
"Enfant jouant avec des joncs marins"	Vienna	—	1875-80	Work on this fountain commenced in 1875 and in 1880 Chapu travelled to Vienna to complete his contribution to it. It had been commissioned by Baron Nathaniel de Rothschild. Chapu's composition involved a statue of Amphitrite accompanied by Triton and a child. There is a plaster model in the Musée Henri Chapu. The fountain was destroyed in 1945 but there are design drawings, models and other items concerning the fountain in various other museums.
Effigy of the Duchess of Nemours	Liverpool	—	—	This work was commissioned by the Duc de Nemours for the Church of St Charles Borremeo in Weybridge and is now held in the Walker Gallery in Liverpool.

== Gallery ==
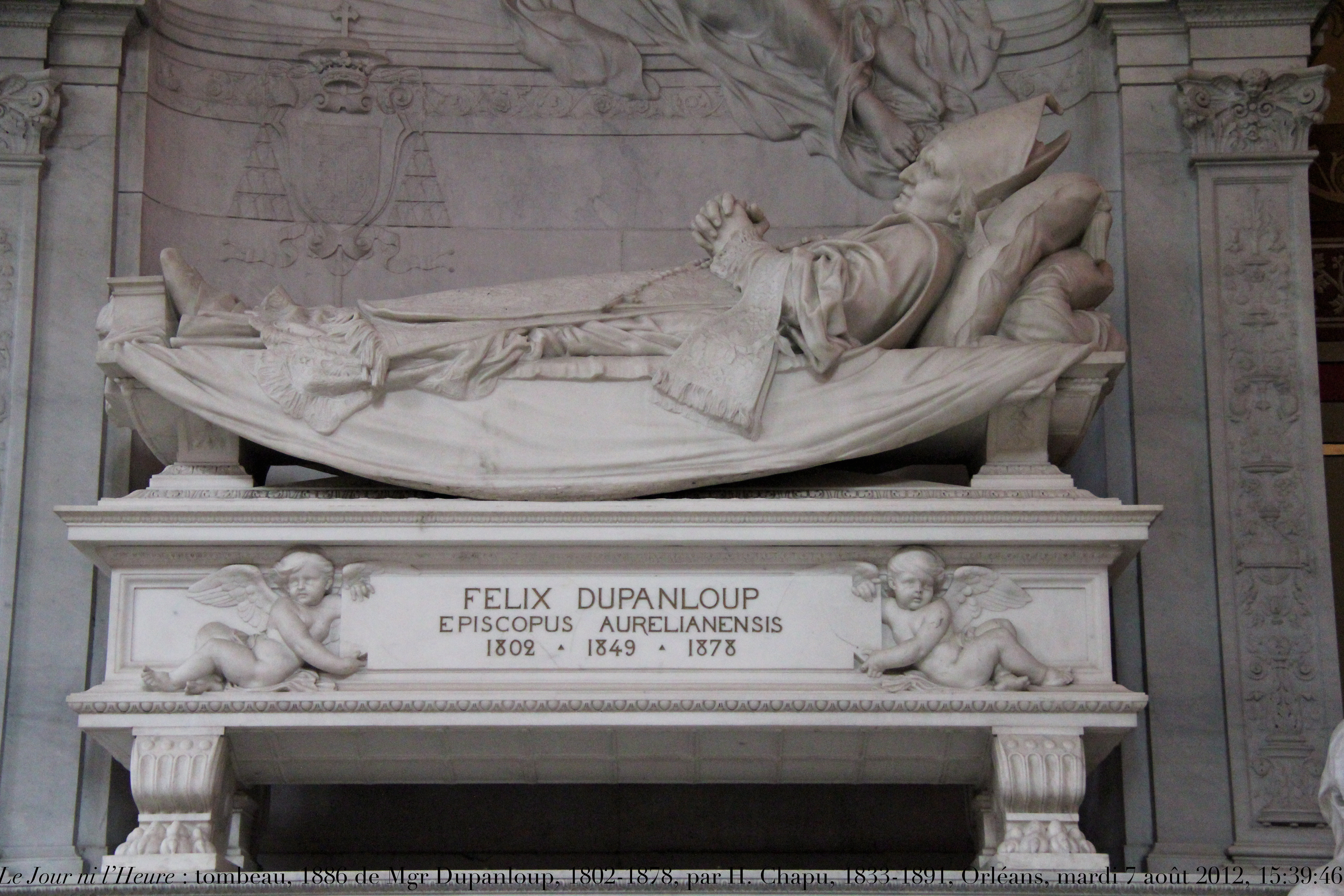
The tomb of Dupanloup by Chapu in Orléans

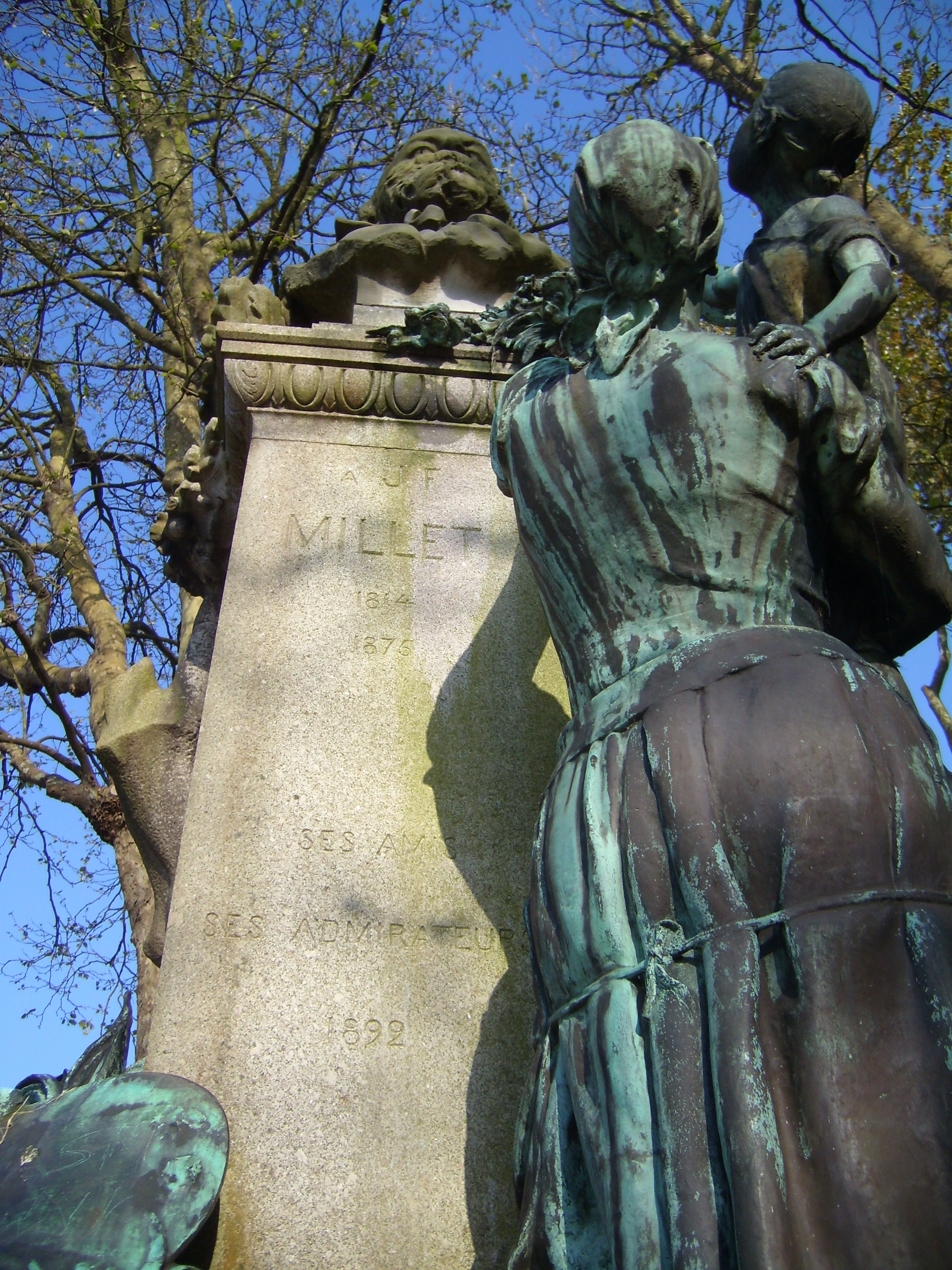
View of Chapu/Bouteiller's monument to the painter Jean-François Millet

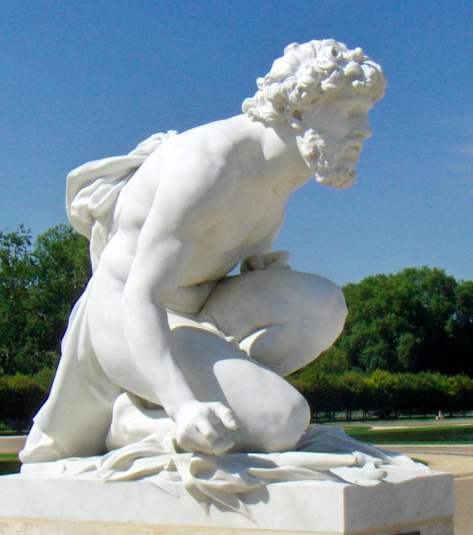
Pluto by Chapu. Executed in 1885, this marble statue was ordered by the Duke d'Aumale for the grounds of the Chateau de Chantilly.

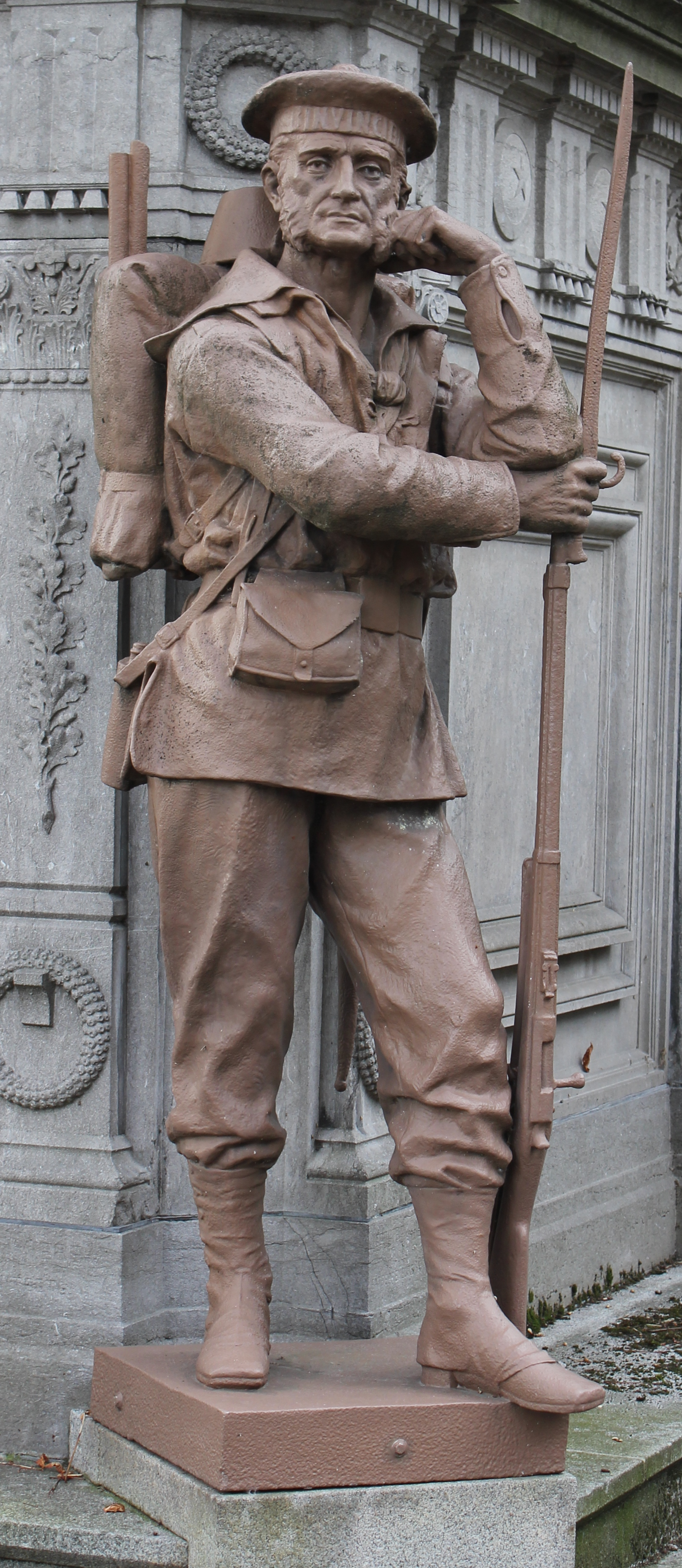
Marine on Henri Chapu's monument to those soldiers killed during the siege of Paris 1870–1871.

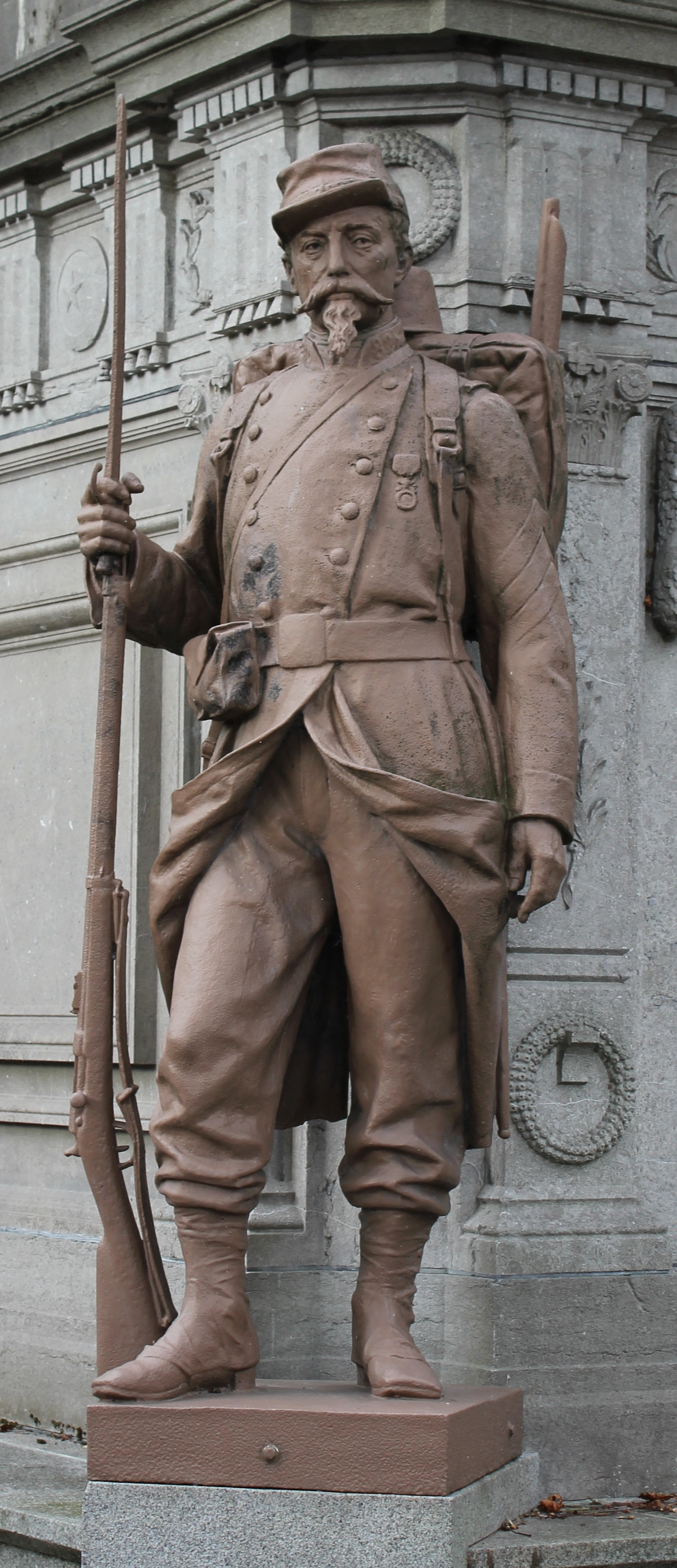
Infantryman on Henri Chapu's monument to those soldiers killed during the siege of Paris 1870–1871.

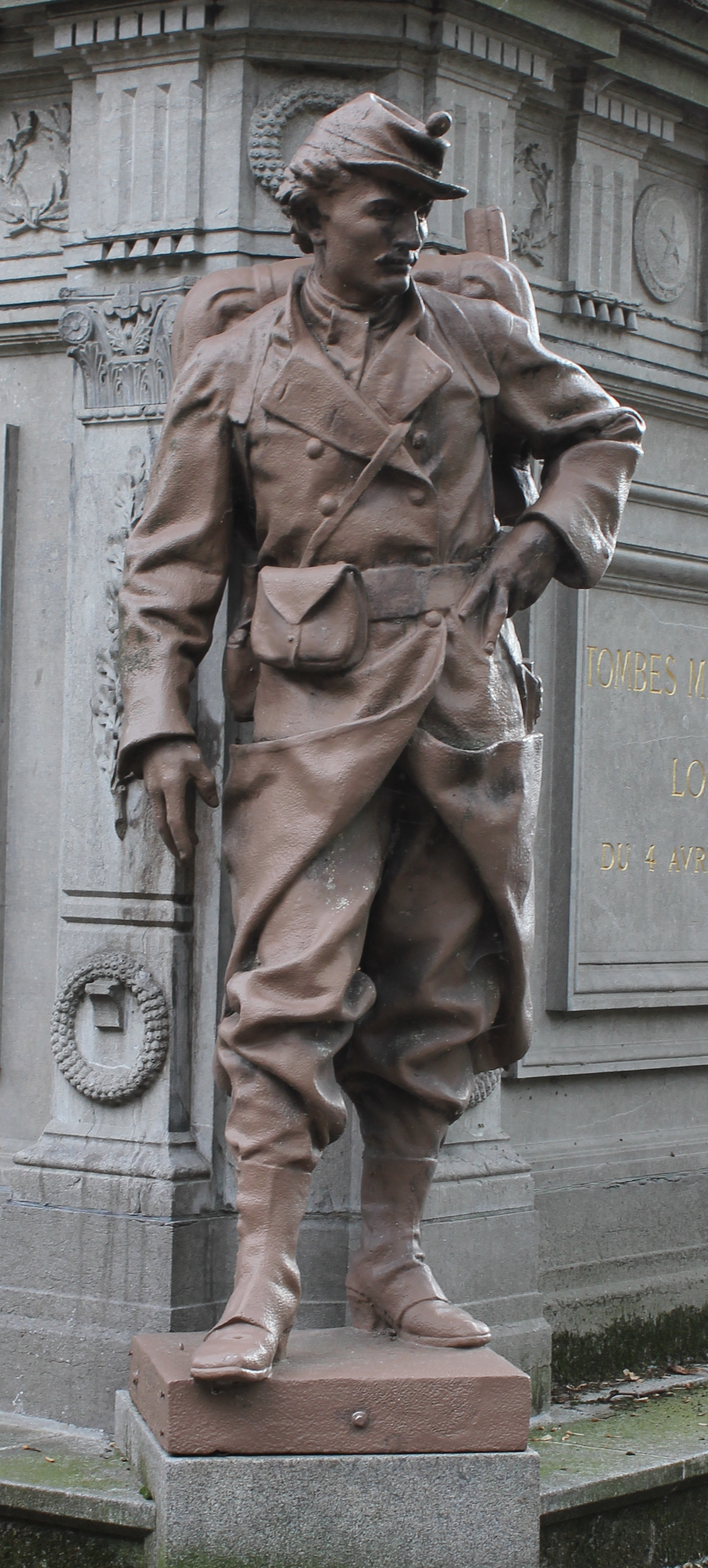
National Guardsman on Henri Chapu's monument to those soldiers killed during the siege of Paris 1870–1871.

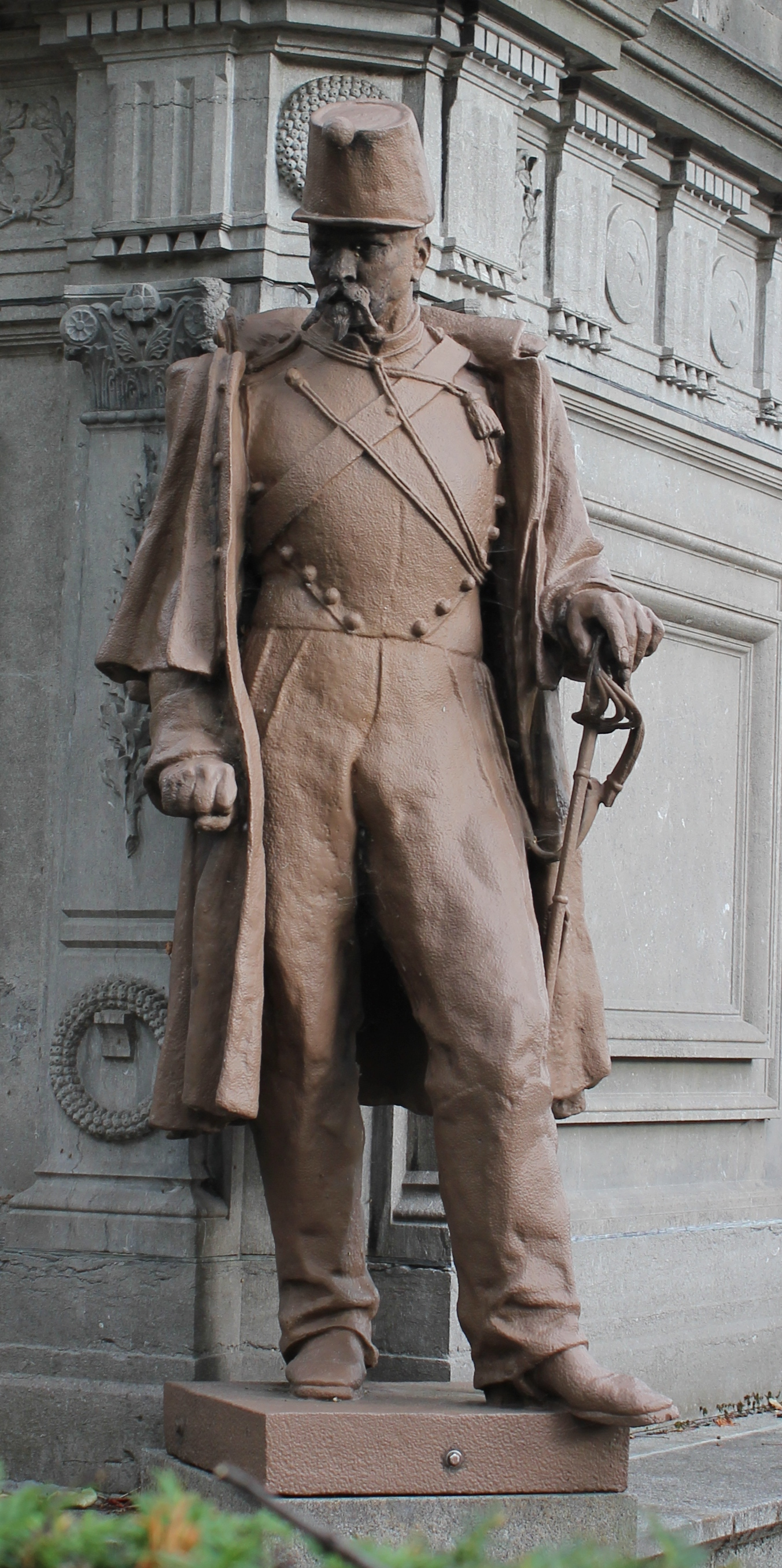
Artilleryman on Henri Chapu's monument to those soldiers killed during the siege of Paris 1870–1871.
