= Colombier =

Colombier or Colombiers may refer to:

== Places ==
=== France ===
- Colombier, Saint Barthélemy, Saint Barthélemy
- Colombier, Allier, in the Allier département
- Colombier, Côte-d'Or, in the Côte-d'Or département
- Colombier, Dordogne, in the Dordogne département
- Colombier, Haute-Saône, in the Haute-Saône département
- Colombier, Loire, in the Loire département
- Colombier-en-Brionnais, in the Saône-et-Loire département
- Colombier-Fontaine, in the Doubs département
- Colombier-le-Cardinal, in the Ardèche département
- Colombier-le-Jeune, in the Ardèche département
- Colombier-le-Vieux, in the Ardèche département
- Colombier-Saugnieu, in the Rhône département

==== Communes in France ====
- Colombiers, Charente-Maritime, in the Charente-Maritime département
- Colombiers, Cher, in the Cher département
- Colombiers, Hérault, in the Hérault département
- Colombiers, Orne, in the Orne département
- Colombiers, Vienne, in the Vienne département
- Colombiers-du-Plessis, in the Mayenne département
- Colombiers-sur-Seulles, in the Calvados département

=== Switzerland ===
- Colombier, Neuchâtel, in Neuchâtel canton.
- Colombier, Vaud, in Vaud canton.

=== Canada ===
- Colombier, Quebec, Canada

== Other ==
- Colombier, another name for the wine grape Colombard
- Colombier, a dovecote
- Colombier, a large size of paper
- Colombier Castle, a castle in Colombier, Neuchâtel, Switzerland
- FC Colombier, association football team from Colombier, Switzerland
- Jean Colombier (born 1945), French writer
- Michel Colombier (1939–2004), French composer, arranger, and conductor
- Mont Colombier, a mountain in Savoie, France
- Eugénie du Colombier (1806–1888) French painter
