= Jean-Baptiste Mauzaisse =

French painter and lithographer (1784–1844)

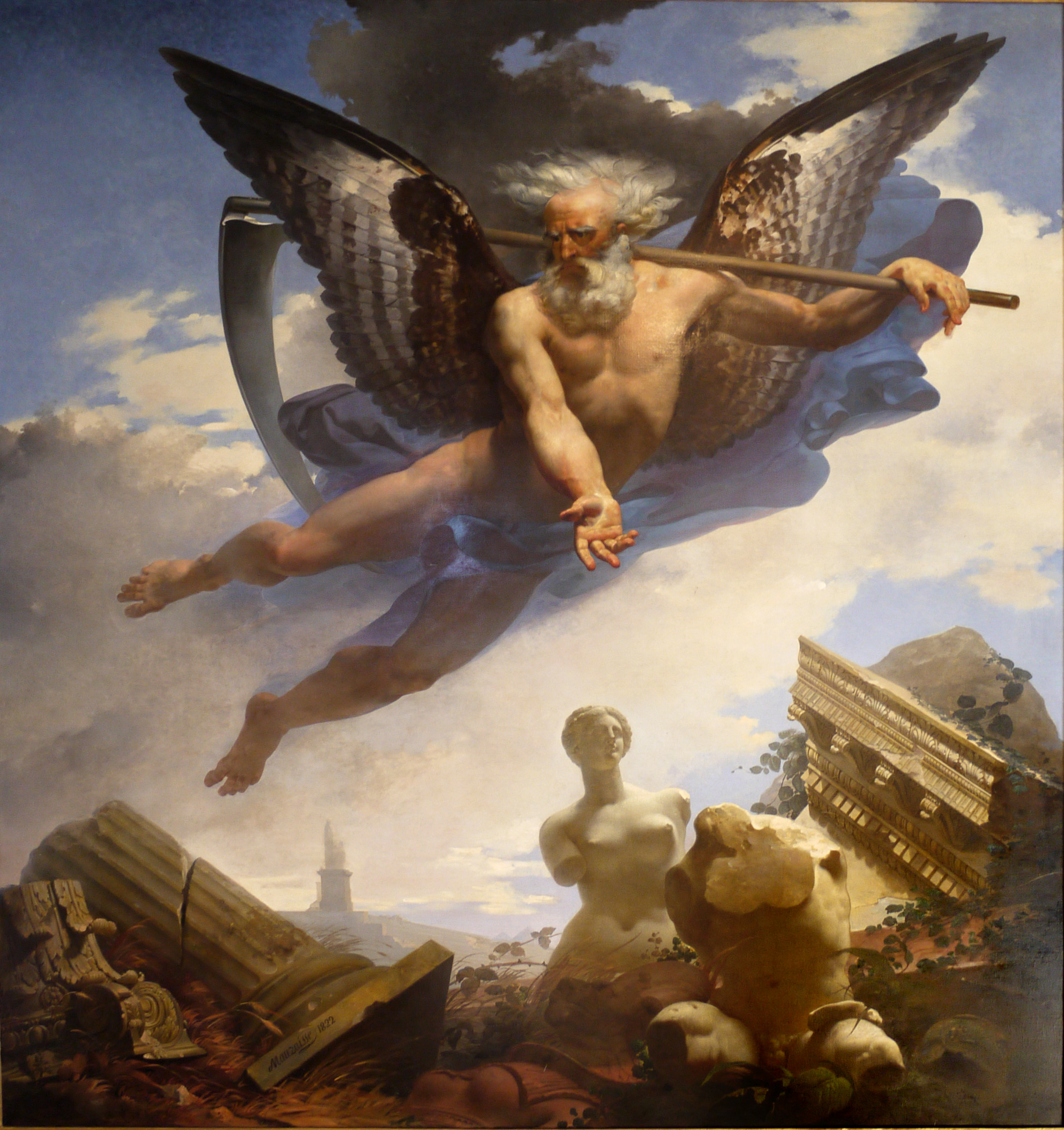
Time, Showing the Ruins it Brings and the Treasures to be Found (Louvre)

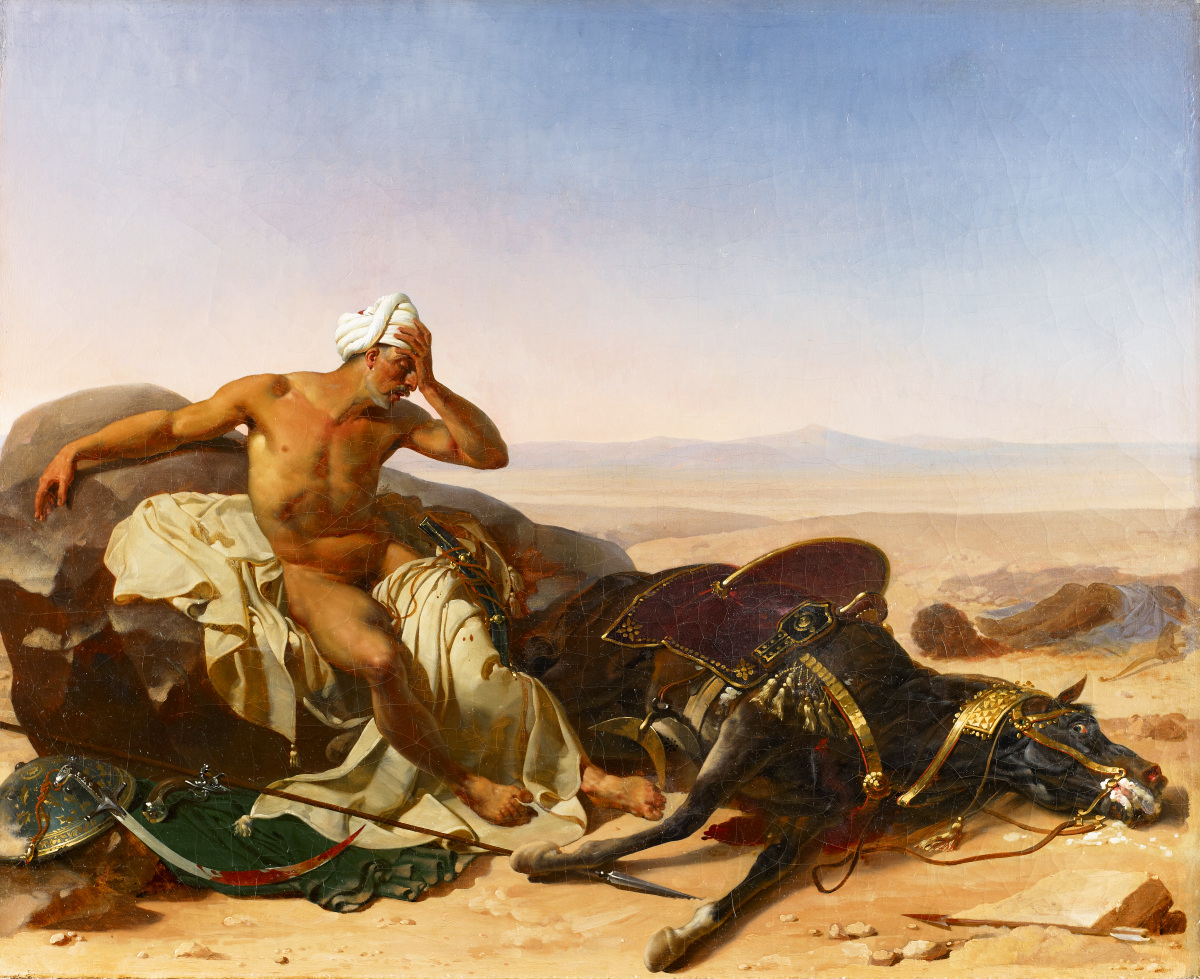
Arab Lamenting the Death of His Courser

Jean-Baptiste Mauzaisse (French pronunciation: [ʒɑ̃ batist mozɛs]; 1 November 1784 – 15 November 1844) was a French painter and lithographer; specializing in battle scenes and portraits.

== Biography ==
He was born in Corbeil to a family of modest background. His father was the organist at Corbeil Cathedral, and could not afford to pay for Jean-Baptiste's studies. At the age of nineteen, he left home and was able to find a position in the studios of François-André Vincent, at the École des Beaux-Arts in Paris. His début at the Salon came in 1808, and he obtained a first-class gold medal there in 1812, for Arab Lamenting the Death of His Courser.

Many of his commissions were for the government, often in collaboration with other artists. These included decorating the apartments of King Louis XVIII, the figures of Prometheus and Tantalus for the Musée de Picardie in Amiens (1819), and several plafonds at the Louvre (1822), in what is now known as the "Salle des Bijoux". These feature figures representing Science, Art, Commerce, and War, as well as the four seasons. For his work there, he was named a Knight in the Legion of Honor in 1823.

He also created decorations for two cathedrals, the Cathédrale Saint-Étienne de Bourges, and the Cathédrale Saint-Pierre-et-Saint-Paul de Nantes. In 1837, he received a personal commission from Louis-Philippe, to portray him at the Battle of Valmy. Mauzaisse died in 1844 in Paris.

A significant number of his works are in private collections. In addition to those at the Louvre, some may be seen at the Metropolitan Museum of Art in New York.
