= Achille Collas =

French inventor (1795–1859)

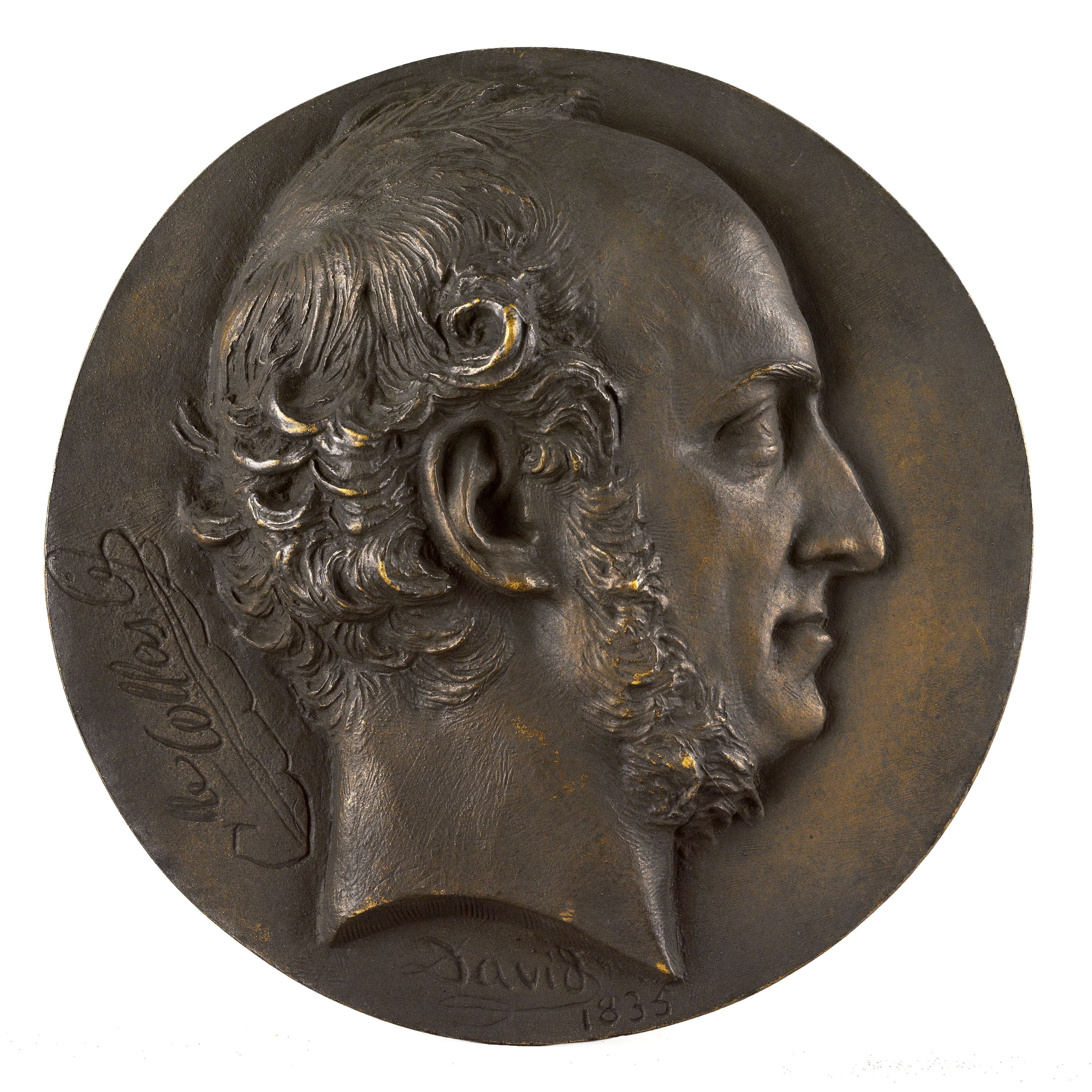
Portrait of Achille Collas, David d'Angers (musée Carnavalet, 1835).

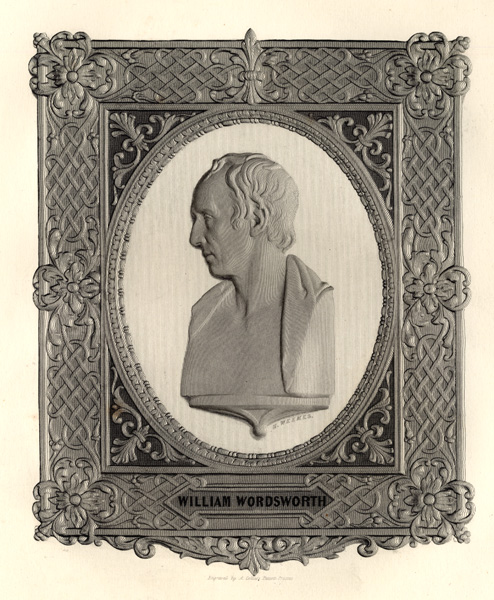
William Wordsworth, engraved mechanically by Achille Collas after a medallion by Henry Weekes, from the 1838 book The authors of England by Henry Fothergill Chorley.

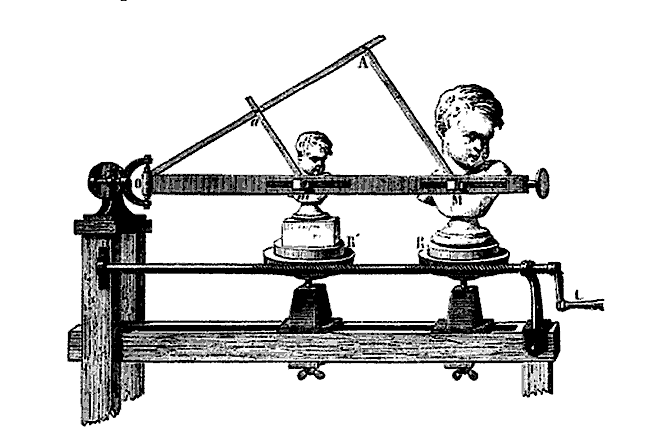
Collas’s reduction machine

Achille Collas (1795–1859) was a French engineer, inventor, writer and engraver who developed a way of mechanically creating engravings after medallions and other reliefs, and a machine to copy sculptures at a smaller scale, the so-called "réduction méchanique", which popularized small sculptures and has been credited with being almost entirely responsible for "the transformation of the bronze industry".

Achille Collas was born in Paris in 1795. He worked as an engineer before joining the Army at the end of the First French Empire. Afterwards he worked as a toolmaker and inventor. He never married. He applied for many patents, most of them for long-forgotten inventions for buckle-making machines and other tools. His most successful inventions had to do with the reproduction of 3D artworks in 2D and 3D.

He produced the illustrations for The authors of England: A series of medallion portraits of modern literary characters, engraved from the works of British artists by Henry Fothergill Chorley from 1838: this work contains a ten-page introduction outlining the new procedure of mechanically creating engravings from cameos and medals, developed by Collas. He developed this method between 1825 and 1832, demonstrating it at the Salon of 1833. Using this procedure, he created the Trésor de numismatique et glyptique. When it was finished in 1850, it reproduced some 15,000 items, spread over 20 volumes.

His second great invention came in 1836, when he produced a pantograph-like machine to reproduce sculptures in different scales and materials. In 1838, he started a company together with Ferdinand Barbedienne, the "Société Collas et Barbedienne", for the production and marketing of reduced copies of sculptures in different materials ranging from plaster and wood to bronze and ivory. The first product of the company was a reproduction of the Venus de Milo, but for the next ten years nothing much happened, until Barbedienne sent some pieces to The Great Exhibition of 1851, where the company received a special medal. Further success came in 1855, when Collas was awarded the Grand Médaille d'Honneur of the Exposition Universelle in Paris. By the time of Barbedienne's death in 1892 the company had some 600 employees. It existed until 1954.
