= Pino Musi =

Italian photographer and visual artist (born 1958)

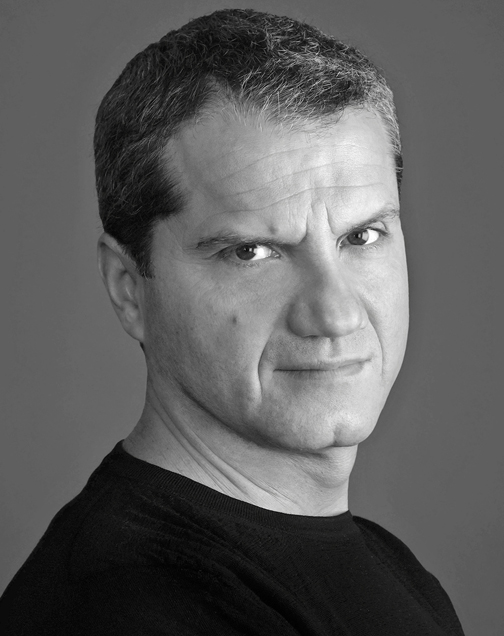
- Born: 18 March 1958 (age 68); Salerno, Italy
- Known for: Photography of architecture, archeology, cityscapes
- Website: www.pinomusi.com

Pino Musi (born March 18, 1958, in Salerno, Italy) is an Italian photographer and visual artist currently based in Paris. His subjects have included modern architecture, classical ruins, steel mills, rural architecture and urban cityscapes viewed as pure forms and abstract art. His photographs have been exhibited at the Venice Biennale, the Museum of the Ara Pacis in Rome, and galleries in Italy, Germany, England, France and Switzerland.

== Biography and work ==
Musi was born and grew up in Salerno, Italy and taught himself black-and-white photography beginning at age fourteen. In 1982 he had his first exhibition at the Venice Biennale, entitled Maschere e Persone, images depicting popular religious and pagan rituals in Southern Italy. In the 1980s he collaborated with the sculptor Ugo Marano in a work called The Artist's Rooms, photographing the installations of Marano, made of ceramic, iron and wood.

=== Architectural photography ===
In the 1990s he began creating books of photographs of modern architecture, always in black and white, presenting the buildings as complex works of visual art, with contrasts and harmonies of light and darkness. His early photo books included Mario Botta seen by Pino Musi, depicting the work of the architect Mario Botta, especially Évry Cathedral, the only modernist cathedral completed in the 20th century; a photographic study of the Chapelle Notre Dame du Haut à Ronchamp, the Modernist church designed by Le Corbusier; and a book devoted on the work of the 1930s avant-garde architect Giuseppe Terragni.

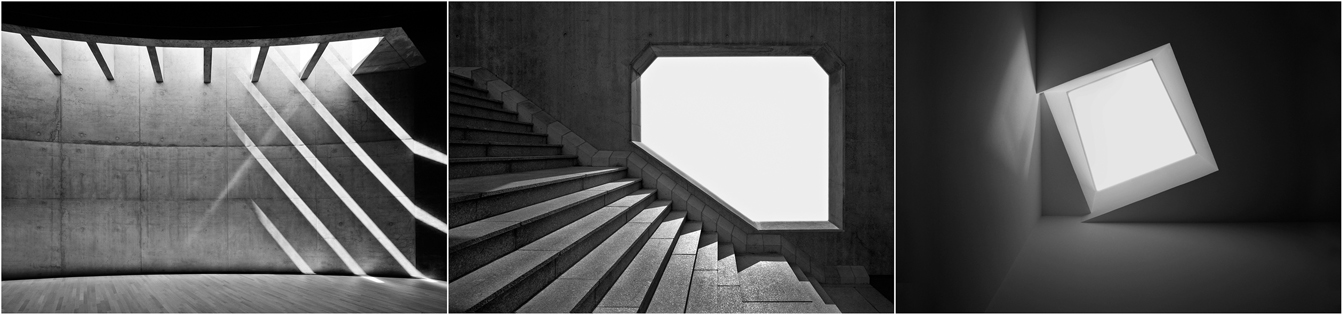
From "Limes" - triptych (2008)

In 2012 he presented Facecity (scroll) at the Biennale of Architecture in Venice. This was a series of twenty-one photographs of buildings in Milan built in the 1950s and 1960s. The images were edited to remove ornament or other signs that would distract from the architecture. The intention, Musi explained, was that the images would interact with each other, like the counterpoints and dissonances in music.

The book "Border Soundscapes" (2019) illustrated Musi's theme of the similar effects achieved by music and photography, through contrasts of light and dark, loudness and softness, and variations of key and harmony.

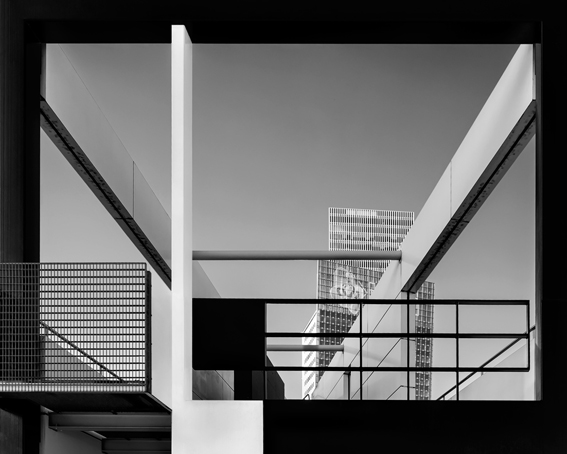
Cityscape of Rotterdam, from "Corpi d'Architettura" (1995-2021)

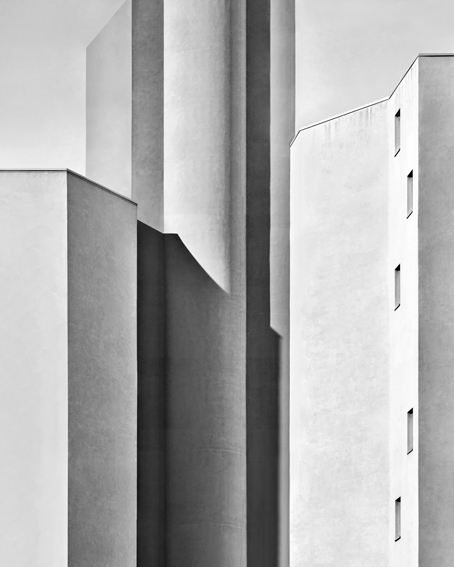
From “Polyphōnia" (2021)

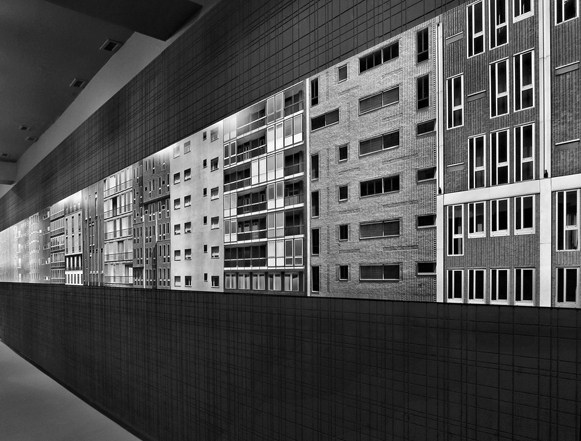
"Facecity" scroll (2012) at the Venice Biennale

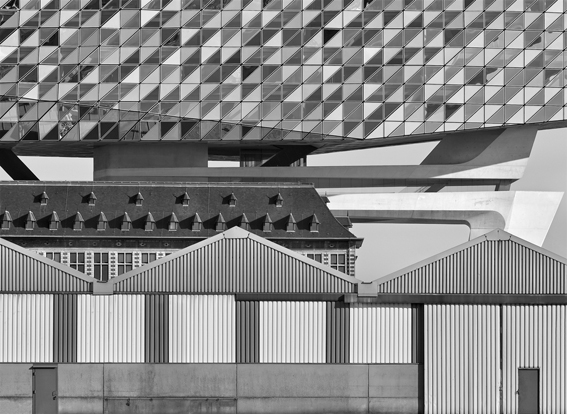
Cityscape of Antwerp, from "Corpi d'Architettura" (1995-2021)

=== Archeology ===
In 2003 he created Libro, a book of closeup photographs of pages from early books, with a text by Cesare de Seta. Other books explored the stark traditional rural architecture of Terra del Sarno region (Metonimie) and the rural settlements in the Campania region (Per cammino d'ombre).

In 2010, he turned to archeology and classical architecture with two new photo books; Italia. Bellezza Eterna and Italia. Bellezza e Fede, with texts by Louis Godart. In 2019 he published Grecia. Le radici della Civiltà Europea (Greece the roots of European civilisation), with a text by Flaminio Gualdoni. These books used tri-tone separations in reproducing the black and white photographs, with each image occupying a full page. In 2019 he continued the series with La Grecia di Pino Musi (The Greece of Pino Musi), also with a text by Gualdoni. He also created a book illustrating the rustic architecture of Sicily and its interaction with the landscape.

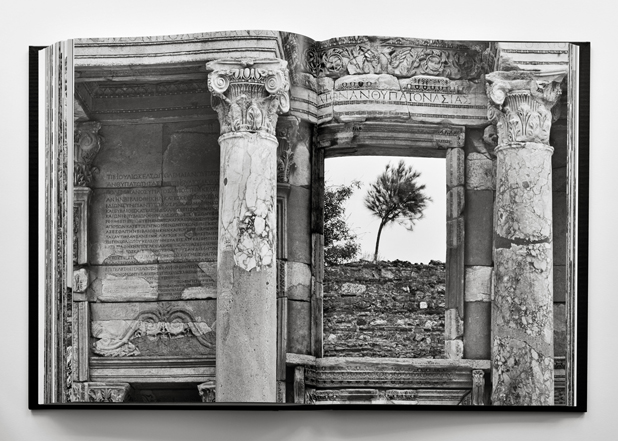
Pages of "Greece, roots of European Civilisation"

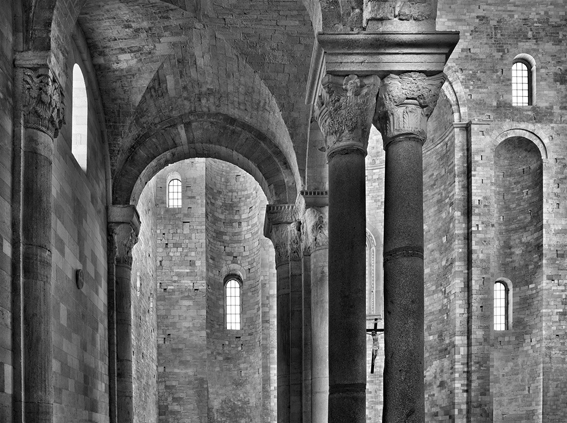
Trani Cathedral, from "Corpi d'Archeologia" (2010-2020)

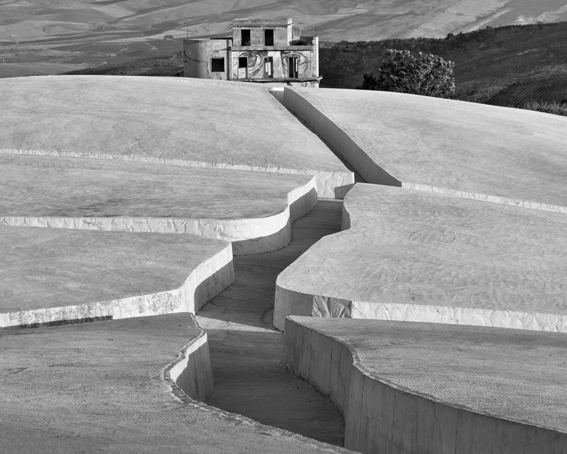
Grande Cretto di Burri, Gibellina, Sicily (2019)

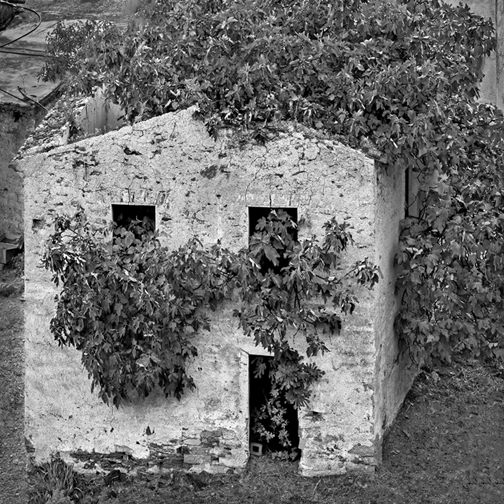
From "Sottotraccia" (2019)

=== Industrial photography and "Operating Theatre" ===
In parallel with architectural photography, he published a series of photo books of industrial plants and machinery. In 2008, Musi produced Steel City, a work illustrating the process of making steel in one of the largest Italian steel mills (ILVA at Taranto). He was commissioned to document the stages involved in steel processing by the Riva Group. His images concentrated on the furnaces, the machinery, and the molten steel. The light in the images was provided by the furnaces.

This was followed by another project, Operating Theatre in 2013, a book of black and white photographs of surgical operating rooms, each taken five minutes after the completion of an operation. The rooms are empty of people, but the surgical couch, scattered instruments, fabrics and debris suggest the drama that took place in the same space a few minutes earlier.

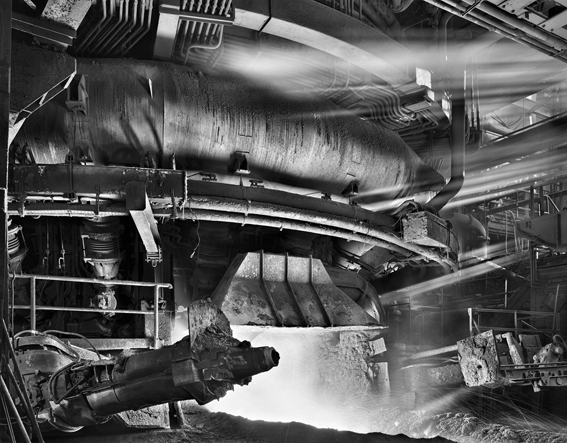
From "Oxymoron" (1998)

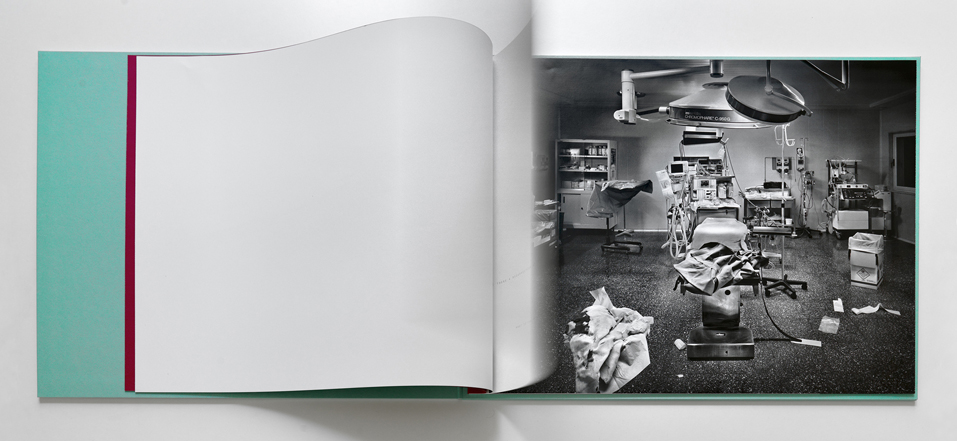
Page from "Operating Theatre" (2013)

== Bibliography ==
- Coignet, Rémi, "Conversations #3", Conversation with Pino Musi, The Eyes Publishing, 23 June, 2020 (French and English)
- Oechslin, Werner, text of Oxymoron, Daco Verlag, Stuttgart (1998)
- Trione, Vincenzo, "Atlante dell'Arte Contemporanea a Napoli e in Campania 1966 - 2016", pages 166-167, Electa Editions (2016)

== Photo books ==
- Strani Tipi, with quotations from Blaise Cendrars. Self Publishing (1980)
- Maschere e Persone, with texts by Angelo Trimarco, Paolo Apolito, Dario Ventimiglia. Venice Theatre Biennale (1983)
- Mario Botta seen by Pino Musi, with a text by Fulvio Irace. Daco Verlag, Stuttgart (1996)
- Ronchamp Le Corbusier, with Jean Petit. Fidia Edizioni d’Arte, Lugano (1997)
- Oxymoron, with a text by Werner Oechslin. Daco Verlag, Stuttgart (1998)
- Pino Musi - Giuseppe Terragni, Borgovico 33, Como (2002)
- Libro, with a text by Cesare De Seta. Biblioteca Civica, Rovereto (2002)
- Per cammino d'ombre, with a text by Raffaele D'Andria. Edizione della Provincia di Salerno (2003)
- Metonimie, with texts by Antonio Milone and Antonella Gemei. Edizione del Patto dell’Agro (2003)
- La fotografia ri-guarda la scuola, Edizioni Aporema per l’Arte, Napoli (2005)
- Steel City ILVA, RivaFire, Taranto (2009)
- Roma Antiqua, FMR edizioni, Bologna (2010)
- Italia. Bellezza Eterna, with a text by Louis Godart. FMR edizioni, Bologna (2011)
- Italia. Bellezza e Fede, with a text by Louis Godart. FMR edizioni, Bologna (2012)
- Attraverso, with a text by Stefania Zuliani. Leggermente Fuori Fuoco Edizioni, Salerno (2012)
- Facecity, Venice Architecture Biennale (2012)
- 08:08 Operating Theatre, Self Publishing, Milano (2013)
- Acre, with a text by Alexandre Quoi. Éditions GwinZegal, Guingamp (2017)
- Grecia. Le radici della civiltà europea, with a text by Flaminio Gualdoni. UTET Grandi Opere, Milan (2019)
- La Grecia di Pino Musi, with a text by Flaminio Gualdoni. UTET Grandi Opere, Milan (2019)
- Border Soundscapes, with a text by Marie Rebecchi. Artphilein Editions, Lugano (2019)
- Sottotraccia, with texts by Giovanni Columbu, Valerio Magrelli and Marco Delogu. Punctum Press, Rome (2019)
