= Ferdinand Barbedienne =

French metalworker and manufacturer

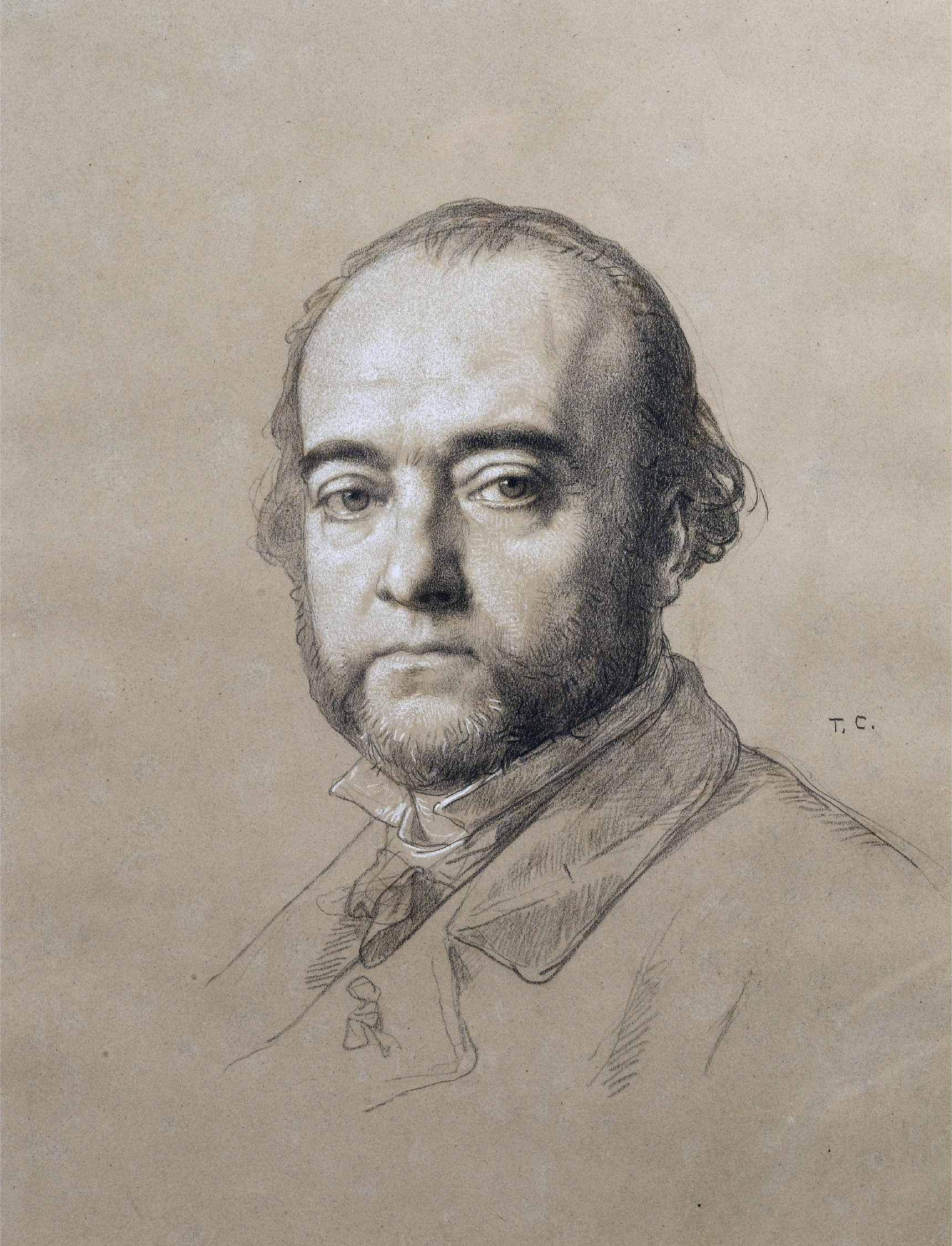
- Barbedienne, by Thomas Couture
- Born: 6 August 1810; Saint-Pierre-en-Auge
- Died: 21 March 1892 (aged 81); Paris
- Resting place: Père Lachaise Cemetery
- Occupations: metalworker and manufacturer
- Awards: Knight of the Legion of Honour 1863, Officer of the Legion of Honour 1867, Commander of the Legion of Honour 1874

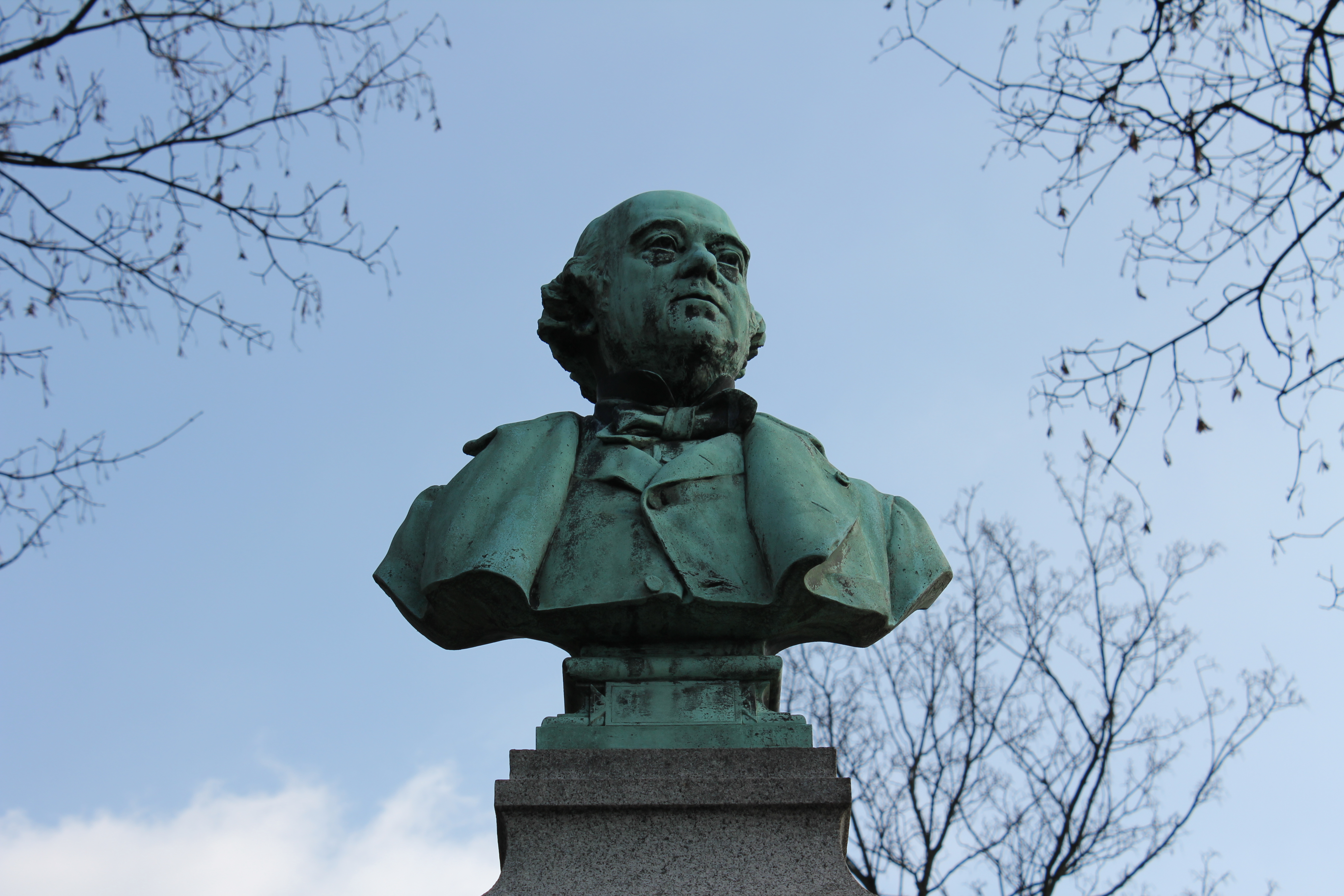
Ferdinand Barbedienne's tombstone in Père Lachaise Cemetery, Paris

Ferdinand Barbedienne (6 August 1810 – 21 March 1892) was a French metalworker and manufacturer, who was well known as a bronze founder.

== Career ==
The son of a small farmer from Calvados, he started his career as a dealer in wallpaper in Paris. In 1838 he went into partnership with Achille Collas (1795-1859), who had just invented a machine to create miniature bronze replicas of statues. Together they started a business selling miniatures of antique statues from museums all over Europe, thus democratising art and making it more accessible to households. From 1843 they extended their scope by reproducing the work of living artists and also diversified by making enamelled household objects. With the outbreak of the Franco-Prussian War in 1870 the firm briefly had to switch to cannon founding owing to the shortage of metals but resumed business afterwards. Following Barbedienne's death in 1892, he was buried in the Père-Lachaise cemetery and the firm was carried on by his nephew Gustave Leblanc until 1952.

Among the principal artists reproduced by the firm were Antoine Louis Barye and Auguste Rodin.

== See also ==
- List of works by Henri Chapu
