= Évry Cathedral =

Catholic church in Évry, France

Coordinates: 48°37′25″N 2°25′43″E

Évry Cathedral Cathédrale de la Résurrection Saint-Corbinien d'Évry
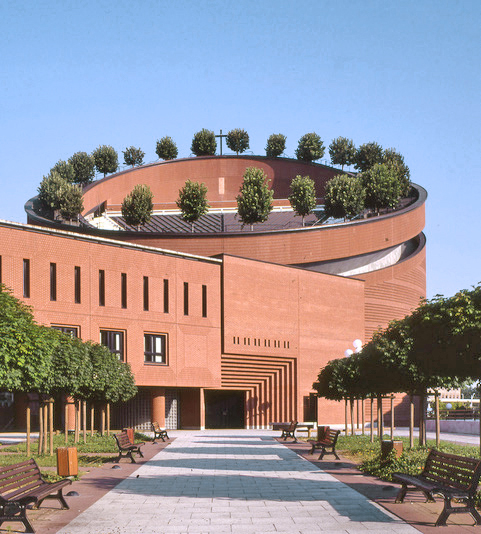

Religion
- Affiliation: Catholic Church
- Province: Diocese of Évry-Corbeil-Essonnes
- Region: Essonne
- Rite: Roman
- Ecclesiastical or organisational status: Cathedral
- Status: Active

Location
- Location: Évry, France
- Interactive map of Évry Cathedral; Cathédrale de la Résurrection Saint-Corbinien d'Évry

Architecture
- Type: church
- Style: modernist
- Groundbreaking: 1995

Évry Cathedral (French: Cathédrale de la Résurrection Saint-Corbinien d'Évry) is a Catholic church located in the new town of Évry, Essonne, France. The cathedral was designed by Swiss architect Mario Botta. It opened in 1995 and was consecrated and dedicated to Saint Corbinian in 1996. It is the only cathedral begun and completed in France in the 20th century.

== History ==
Évry is located in the suburbs of Paris, a new town taking the place of Corbeil-Essonnes as the chief town of the Essonne Département, and having a large majority immigrant population. The diocese was created in 1966, and the parish church of Saint-Spire in Corbeil-Essonnes was elevated to the status of the bishop's seat as Corbeil Cathedral, but neither it nor any other existing church was suitable in size and location; the bishop's offices were in a converted primary school for want of more suitable accommodation. Évry was the natural centre of the area and population of the new diocese and was accordingly chosen as the episcopal centre, but lacked a suitable significant structure.

In 1988, the diocese was renamed the Diocese of Évry–Corbeil-Essonnes and Évry Cathedral was commissioned from the Swiss architect Mario Botta. Forty-one years old at the time, Botta was particularly known for his reconstruction of the church of St John the Baptist in Mogno, after the former church was destroyed by an avalanche. The new church in Mogno, in the Ticino canton of Switzerland, was built in the form of a truncated cylinder, and was completed in 1986.

Initial studies for the cathedral began in 1988. Fundraising began in 1989. The new cathedral was funded by contributions from more than 200,000 donors. Other major contributors included a national fund created between the two world wars for the reconstruction of religious structures destroyed in the Paris region, a major contribution from the Archdiocese of Munich and Freising, Germany, and public agencies in the Île-de-France region.

Initial studies were carried out the same year, and the first stone was laid at Easter 1991. Construction began in 1992 and was completed in 1995. The first mass was held in that year. The cathedral was formally consecrated on 2 May 1996. The cathedral was visited by Pope John-Paul II on 22 August 1997.

== Exterior ==
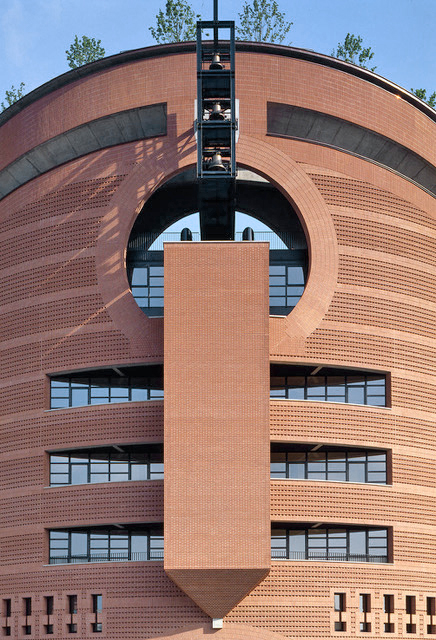
The cathedral from the northwest (photo by Pino Musi)

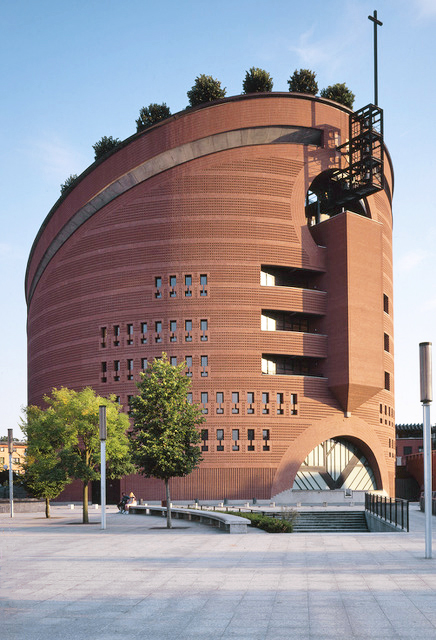
Façade of Évry Cathedral

=== Form ===
The cathedral is in the form of a truncated cylinder, with an inclined roof. The line of the roof is broken by trees, giving a variation of colour with the changing seasons. Describing his choice of the cylindrical form, Botta wrote, "I find in the primary forms a clarity and a call to order amid disorder, whether it concerns a church, a mansion or a house." The truncated cylinder had appeared in one of his first buildings, the Church of San Giovanni Batista in Mogno, Switzerland (1986–1996) and later appeared in the San Francisco Museum of Modern Art (1990–1995).

=== Material ===
The cathedral exterior gives the impression of being constructed entirely of brick, but is actually composed of two cylinders of reinforced concrete covered with bricks of the classic construction size. The inner cylinder is 29.3 metres (96 ft); the outer is 38.4 metres (126 ft). The space between the cylinders is filled with passageways, staircases and technical spaces.

The brick of the exterior is designed as a series of horizontal bands, broken by a small number of windows. The bricks are laid in designs that give it a delicate, lace-like quality. Botta explained that he selected brick for its aesthetic qualities, and because "I try to utilise the most basic, humble materials, but with the desire to give them a certain dignity."

=== Northwest side – bell tower ===
The highest point of the cylinder faces to the northwest, and presents a series of geometric forms and symbols from the bottom to the top. At the bottom is a hemispherical window with a design that represents a stylised tree of life. Above this are the windows of the National Centre for Sacred Art, separated by a vertical rectangular column that contains a stairway. Above this is an oculus window and above it, attached to the façade, is the metallic bell tower, containing five bells. The bell tower supports the cross above.

=== Southeast side – main entrance ===
The principal entrance to the cathedral is on the southeast side, behind a V-shaped terrace. The archivolts over the entry porch suggest the portal of a Gothic cathedral, but in this case are pure rectangles without sculpture, designed to highlight the contrast between darkness and light. Over the entrance are rows of small vertical windows that resemble arrowslits, adding to the appearance of a medieval castle.

== Interior ==
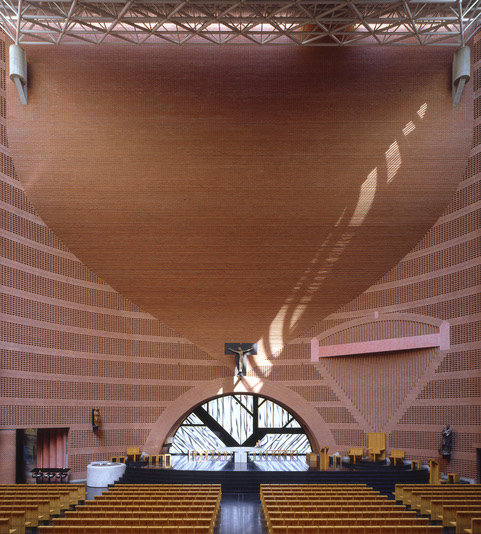
View from the back toward the altar

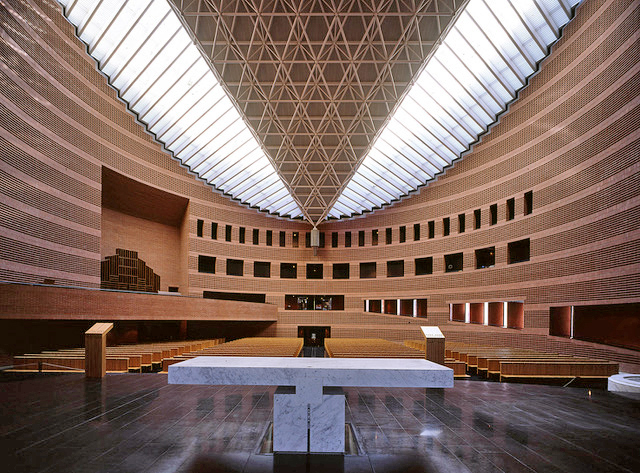
Altar and nave

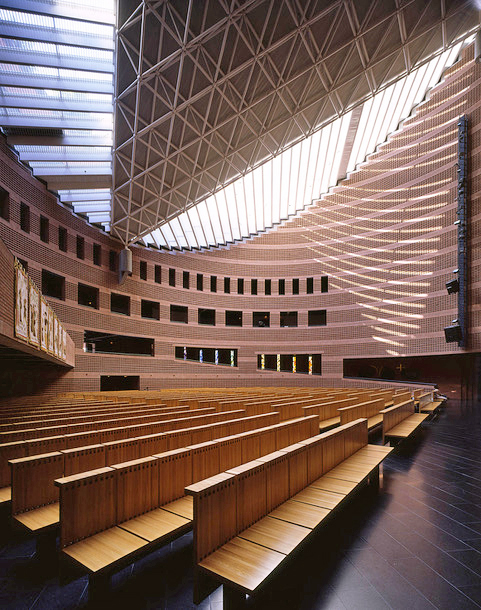
Nave and the roof

Within the interior of the church, the altar and the chancel are located to the northwest, facing the main portal to the southeast.

=== Nave ===
The semicircular nave, the portion of the church where the congregation is seated, resembles a theatre, with rows of seats on the main floor and additional seating in two levels of galleries. It can seat between eight hundred and fifteen hundred worshippers. The organ is placed in a niche in the brick, overlooking a balcony to accommodate the singers.

The wooden pews or seats were designed by Botta and made from light-coloured oak from Burgundy. Their design is very simple and geometric, and the straight rows provide a contrast with the curving walls of the nave.

=== Chancel ===
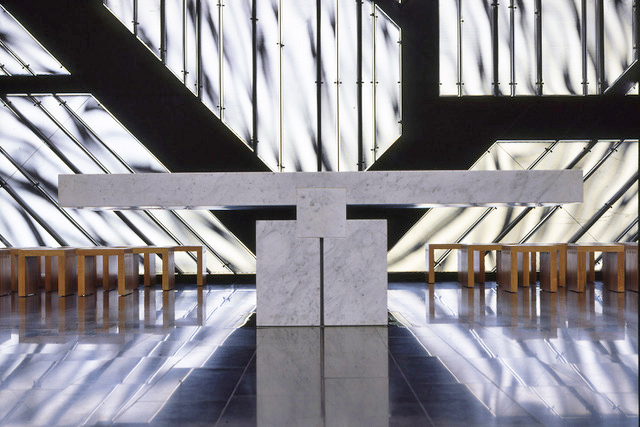
Altar and stained glass

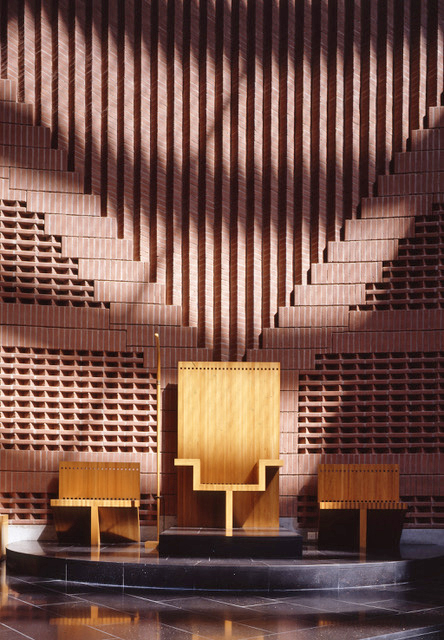
The Bishop's Chair

The chancel is traditionally the part of the cathedral reserved for the clergy, separating the nave and apse. At Évry it is separated from the nave by six steps up to a platform where the altar is located. Behind the altar is a dramatic curving arch with a modern stained glass window in light and dark glass, representing the Tree of Life. This was not part of the original design of the cathedral but was requested by the bishop as a means of representing the divinity of light.

- The altar is made of a single block of Carrara marble. Above the altar and window is a 19th-century statue of Christ on the cross carved of light-coloured wood, from Tanzania.
- Against the wall overlooking the lectern is a modern bronze statue of Saint Corbinian on the Cross, the cathedral's patron saint, made by the French sculptors Hugues and France Siptrott.
- The baptismal font is located to the left of the altar platform, viewed from the nave. It is circular and large enough for baptisms by immersion, and made of white Carrara marble set against the black granite of the floor. Its placement corresponds with the doctrine of the Vatican II Council, which declared that baptism was an event to be shared with the whole church community.
- The lectern is made of light-coloured wood from Burgundy, and is normally to the right of the chancel viewed from the nave, but can be placed as needed for a ceremony.
- The tabernacle in the chancel, near the lectern, contains the consecrated hosts used during the communion ceremony. It is a cube designed by the French artist Louis Cane, its three outer sides decorated with Biblical symbols inspired by those of the early Christians.
- The rectangular bishop's seat or throne (the cathedra) is made of the same light-coloured oak as the pews. It is flanked by two smaller seats for the assisting clerics. The position of the seat is given visible prominence by the design on the brick wall behind it, and by the semicircular section of black stone floor on which it lies.

=== Ambulatory ===
The ambulatory is a wide curving stairway that gradually descends from the southeast entrance along the church wall down to the intersection between the chancel and the nave. On the left, going down, are a series of wide horizontal openings containing a series of twelve narrow vertical bays with stained glass windows depicting the twelve apostles, made by Father Kim En Joong, a Dominican priest of Korean origin.

The lower portion of the gallery is decorated with works of art, including three large plaques created with petrified wood from Arizona, made by the artist Jean-Christophe Guillon, which depict the arrest, death and resurrection of Christ, and two bronze arcs representing the crown of thorns, engraved with the numbers of the stations of the cross.

=== Ceiling and skylights ===
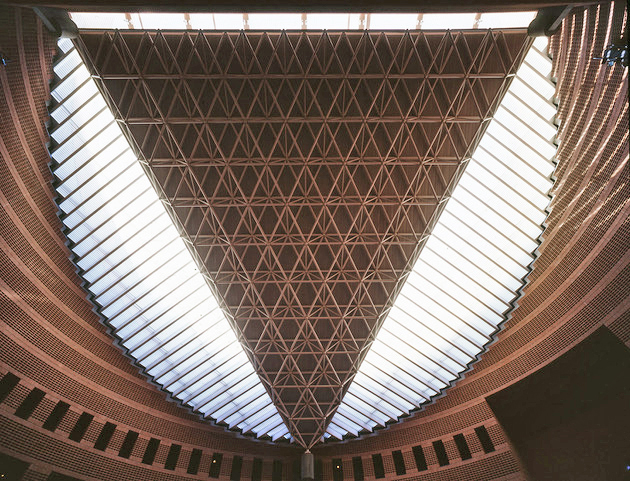
The ceiling

In the centre of the sloping circular roof is a three-dimensional triangle of metal tubing, with windows at its edges shuttered by movable panels, to control the level of incoming light. When the panels are open, the congregation below can also see the circle of trees around the roof. Botta described his nave as "a primary space held between the earth and the sky, a place for meditation, for silence."

=== Chapel of the Blessed Sacrament ===
The Chapel of the Blessed Sacrament, also called the Day Chapel, is the only chapel within the cathedral. It is in an octagonal form, borrowed from early Christian churches such as the Basilica of San Vitale in Ravenna. The number eight is considered a symbol of harmony. The roof is coffered, similar to those of Romanesque cathedrals and some Italian churches, such as Pisa Cathedral.

The floor of the chapel has alternating rows of polished stone and dulled stone, an updated and stylised version of the labyrinth of Chartres Cathedral. The sculptural elements of the chapel include a modernised Virgin and Child statue, a stylised crucifix and a tabernacle made of forged iron and gilded bronze, all by the French artist Gerard Garouste.

== Setting ==
Rather than standing apart from the other buildings around it, the cathedral is closely integrated with them. It stands just ten metres from the city hall and is directly connected with a residential and commercial building complex that contains one hundred housing units, offices and shops, forming an informal "cloister" to the cathedral. The cathedral is also covered with the brick of the same colour as the surrounding buildings. Botta planned the heights of the cathedral cylinder (17 metres (56 ft) to 34 metres (112 ft)) to be in keeping with the height of the adjacent buildings, (12 metres (39 ft)) to 15 metres (49 ft)). He added an additional contrast between the small number of windows on the cathedral cylinder and the large and multiple windows of the adjoining buildings.

== The bells ==
The cathedral has five bells, which were made at the Paccard Foundry in Annecy. The three largest bells are in the horizontal portion of the bell tower, while the smaller bells are in the vertical portion. The peal is tuned to G, A, B, D, and E. The largest bell, weighing 640 kilos, is named "Mario Maria Giuditta Tobia Tomaso", the names of the family of the architect. The others are named for donors, and one, François-Michel, for a young priest of the diocese who died in 1984. The bells were rung for the first time in October 1994.

Bells of Évry Cathedral

They can be heard by clicking on the link at right.

== Inspiration ==
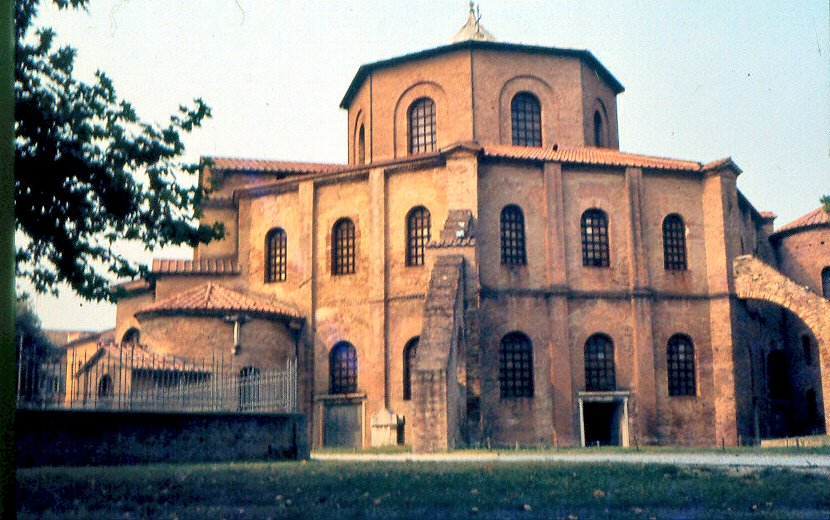
Basilica of San Vitale in Ravenna (6th century)

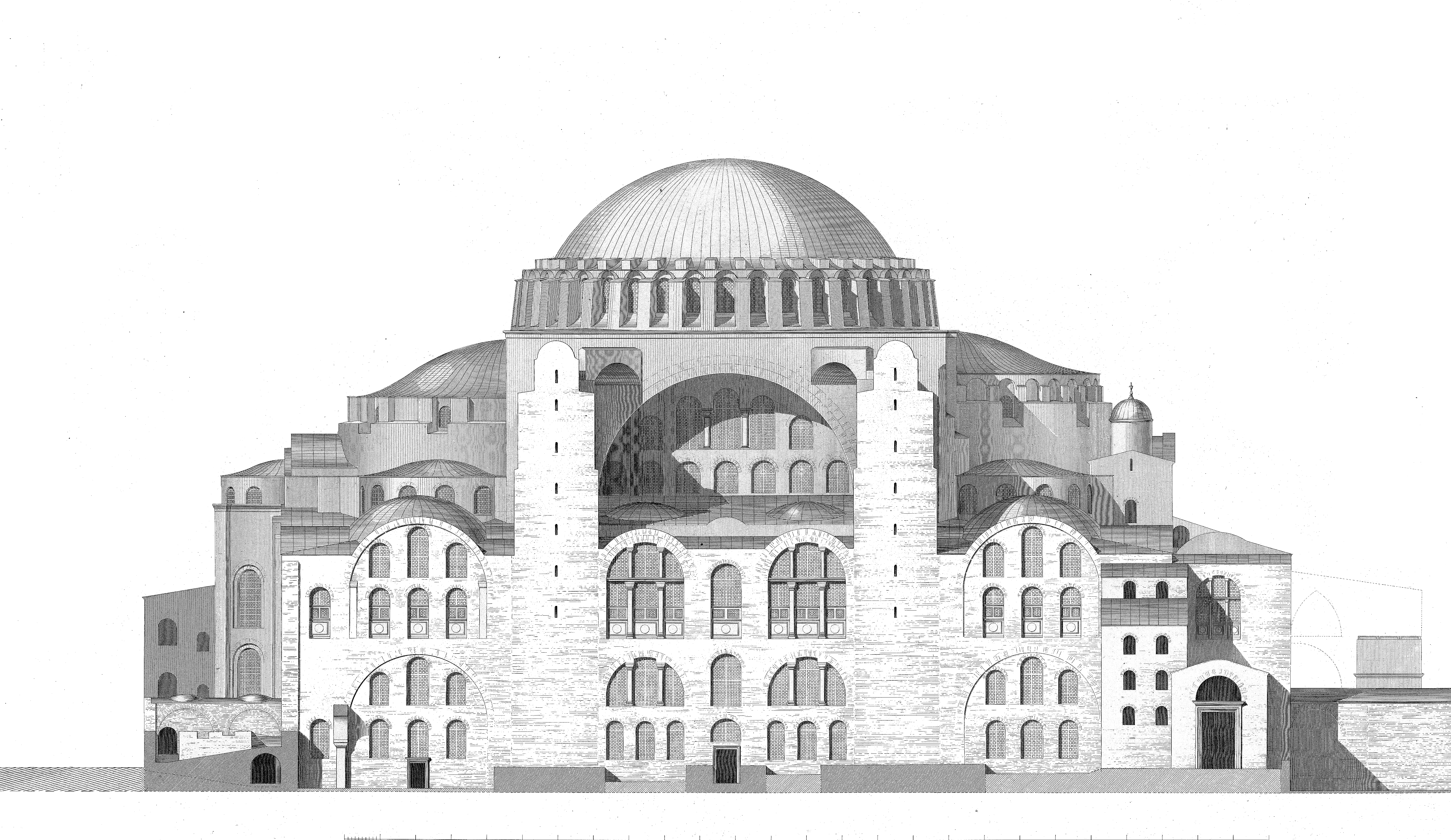
Hagia Sophia in Istanbul (6th century)

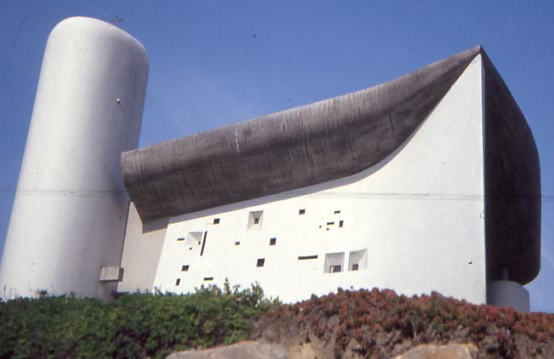
Model of Notre-Dame-du-Haut by Le Corbusier (1955)

Botta wrote, "I was inspired by the great eastern and Byzantine tradition of Christian architecture, with its circular plan or Greek cross, but without a central altar, and by the western tradition with its use of a Greek cross. I tried to mix these two typologies." He cited the Basilica of San Vitale in Ravenna (6th century), and the Byzantine architecture and Romanesque architecture of northern Italy, which he studied as a student in Venice. He said it offered a sense of sobriety, solidity, an appreciation for primary forms, and a sensibility to the effects of light on the exterior.

He was also inspired by more recent works, including Notre-Dame-du-Haut at Ronchamp by Le Corbusier (1955). He had met and briefly collaborated with Le Corbusier in 1965 on a hospital project, not fulfilled.

== Botta and the truncated cylinder ==
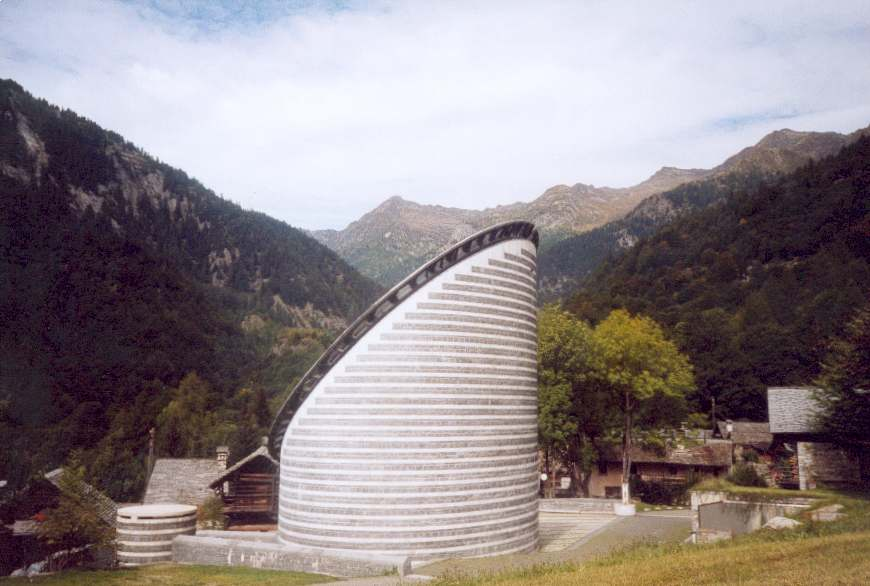
Church in Mogno, Switzerland

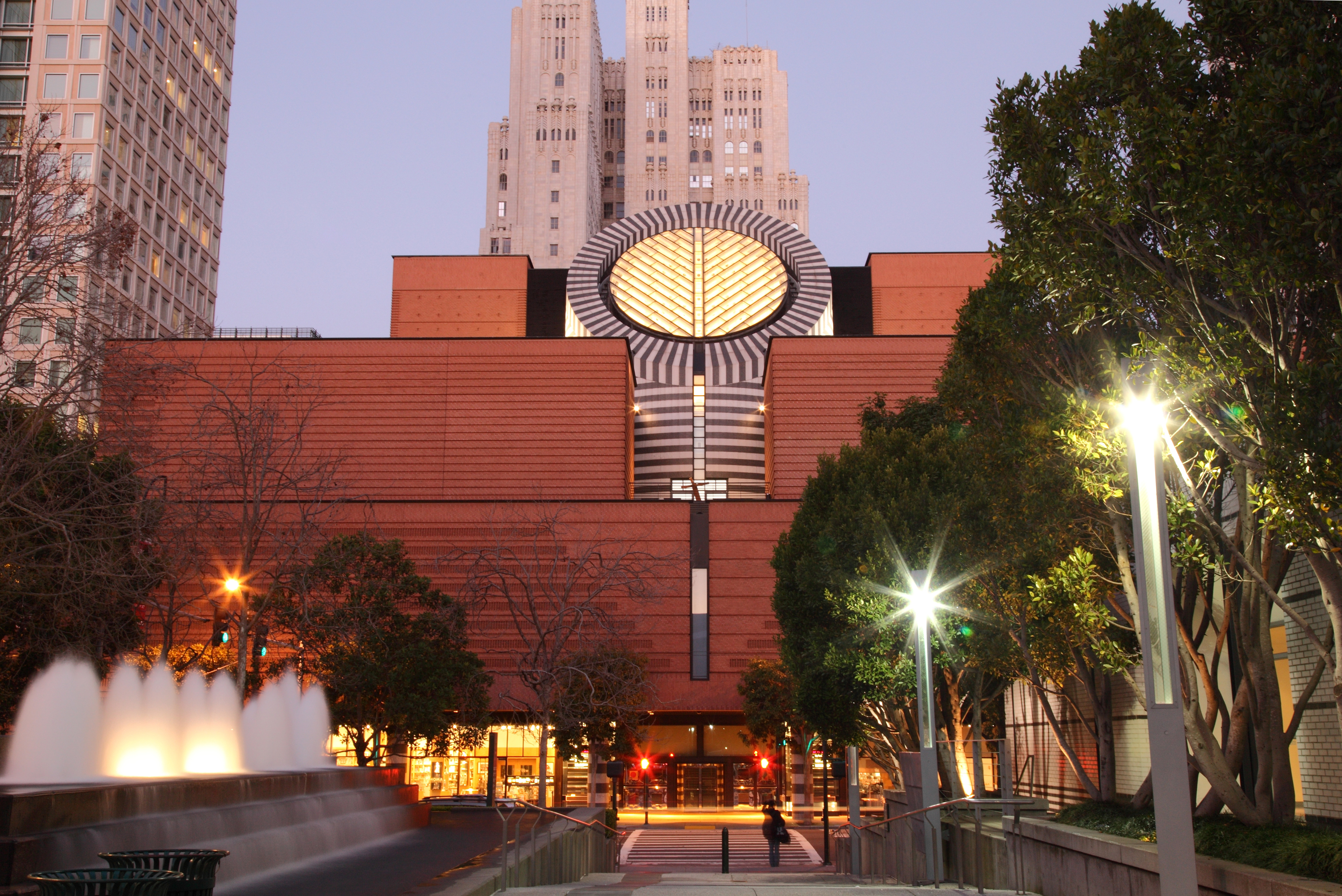
San Francisco Museum of Modern Art

The truncated cylinder became a motif associated with Mario Botta, both before and after Évry Cathedral. He used it previously in a simple form at the church of Mogno (1986–1996), and later in a more complex setting, in the San Francisco Museum of Modern Art (1989–1995).

== Statistics ==
- Height: 17 metres (56 ft) to 36 metres (118 ft)
- Interior diameter: 29.3 metres (96 ft)
- Exterior diameter: 38.4 metres (126 ft)
- Volume: 45,000 cubic meters (1,589,160 cubic feet)
- Capacity: 1500 places, including 800 seated
- Cost: 10.7 million Euros

== Chronology ==
- 1988 – first plans and studies
- 1989 – laying of first stone
- 1992 – construction begins
- 1995 – completion of work, first mass
- 1996 – official inauguration (May 2)
- 1997 – visited by Pope John-Paul II (August 22)

As the seat of the diocese, it has superseded Corbeil Cathedral.
