= Rambluzin-et-Benoite-Vaux =

- Commune
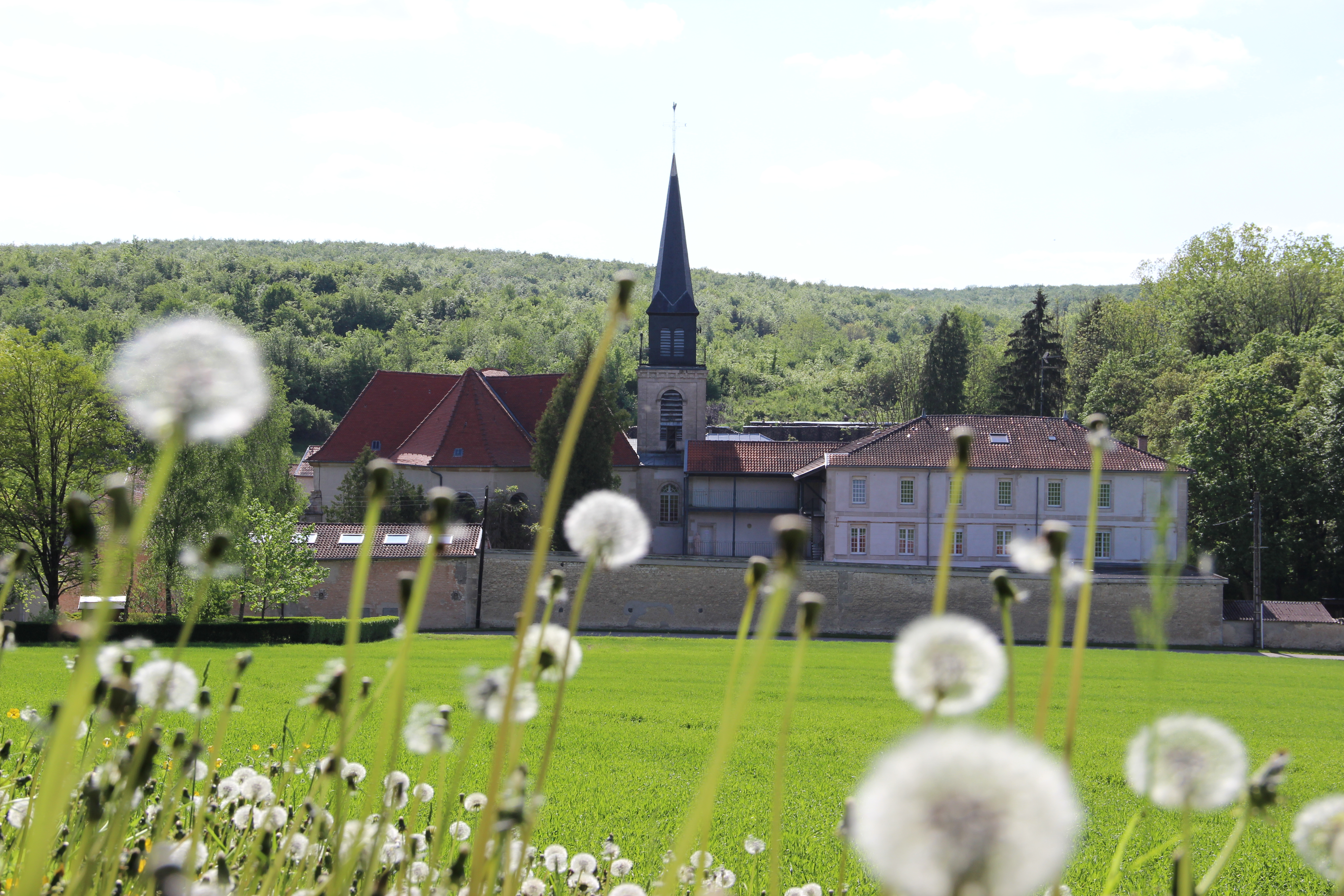
- A general view of Benoite-Vaux

- Coat of arms
- Location of Rambluzin-et-Benoite-Vaux
- Location within France Location within Grand Est
- Coordinates: 48°59′54″N 5°20′09″E
- Country: France
- Region: Grand Est
- Department: Meuse
- Arrondissement: Verdun
- Canton: Dieue-sur-Meuse
- Intercommunality: Val de Meuse - Voie Sacrée

Government
  - Mayor (2020–2026): Thiphanie Banel
- Area^{1}: 18.42 km^{2} (7.11 sq mi)
- Elevation: 300 m (980 ft)
- Highest elevation: 337 m (1,106 ft)
- Lowest elevation: 227 m (745 ft)
- Population (2023): 86
  - Density: 4.7/km^{2} (12/sq mi)
- Time zone: UTC+01:00 (CET)
  - Summer (DST): UTC+02:00 (CEST)
- INSEE/Postal code: 55411 /55220
- ^{1} French Land Register data, which excludes lakes, ponds, glaciers > 1 km^{2} (0.386 sq mi or 247 acres) and river estuaries.

Rambluzin-et-Benoite-Vaux (French pronunciation: [ʁɑ̃blyzɛ̃ e bənwat vo]) is a commune in the Meuse department in Grand Est in north-eastern France.

== See also ==
- Communes of the Meuse department
- List of works by Henri Chapu
