= Saint-Yrieix-sous-Aixe =

- Commune
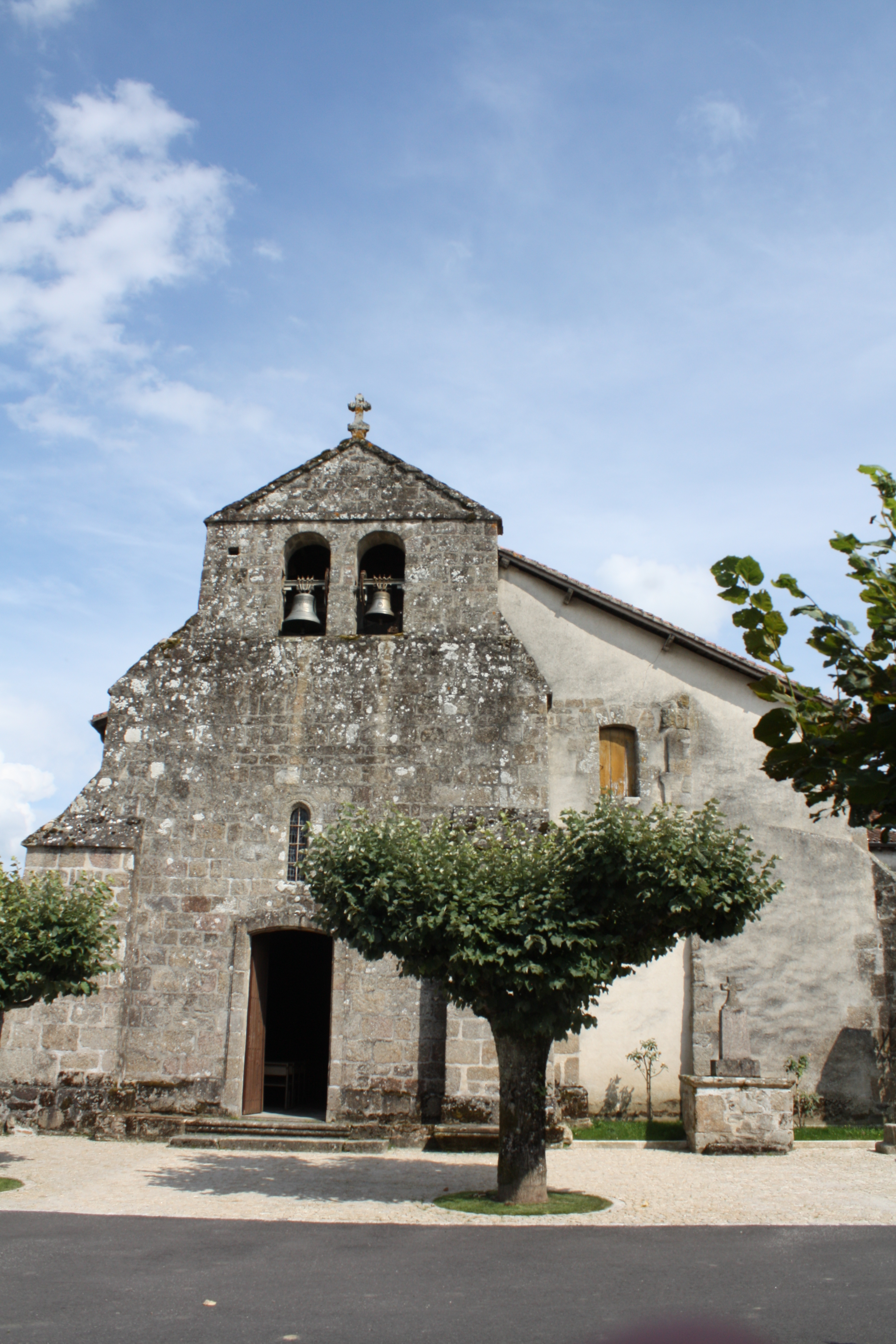
- The church of Saint-Yrieix, in Saint-Yrieix-sous-Aixe
- Location of Saint-Yrieix-sous-Aixe
- Location within France Location within Nouvelle-Aquitaine
- Coordinates: 45°51′33″N 1°04′42″E
- Country: France
- Region: Nouvelle-Aquitaine
- Department: Haute-Vienne
- Arrondissement: Limoges
- Canton: Aixe-sur-Vienne
- Intercommunality: Val de Vienne

Government
  - Mayor (2020–2026): Gérard Kauwache
- Area^{1}: 8.73 km^{2} (3.37 sq mi)
- Highest elevation: 365 m (1,198 ft)
- Lowest elevation: 180 m (590 ft)
- Population (2023): 449
  - Density: 51.4/km^{2} (133/sq mi)
- Time zone: UTC+01:00 (CET)
  - Summer (DST): UTC+02:00 (CEST)
- INSEE/Postal code: 87188 /87700
- ^{1} French Land Register data, which excludes lakes, ponds, glaciers > 1 km^{2} (0.386 sq mi or 247 acres) and river estuaries.

Saint-Yrieix-sous-Aixe (Occitan: Sent Iriès d'Aissa) is a commune in the Haute-Vienne department in the Nouvelle-Aquitaine region in west-central France.

The writer Jean Colombier, winner of the 1990 edition of the Prix Renaudot was born in Saint-Yrieix-sous-Aixe in 1945.

== See also ==
- Communes of the Haute-Vienne department
- List of works by Henri Chapu
