= Corbeil, Marne =

Corbeil
- Commune
- Coat of arms
- Location of Corbeil
- Location within France Location within Grand Est
- Coordinates: 48°34′40″N 4°25′31″E
- Country: France
- Region: Grand Est
- Department: Marne
- Arrondissement: Vitry-le-François
- Canton: Vitry-le-François-Champagne et Der
- Intercommunality: CC Vitry, Champagne et Der

Government
  - Mayor (2020–2026): Christelle Guéry
- Area^{1}: 9.72 km^{2} (3.75 sq mi)
- Elevation: 118 m (387 ft)
- Population (2023): 100
  - Density: 10/km^{2} (27/sq mi)
- Time zone: UTC+01:00 (CET)
  - Summer (DST): UTC+02:00 (CEST)
- INSEE/Postal code: 51169 /51320
- ^{1} French Land Register data, which excludes lakes, ponds, glaciers > 1 km^{2} (0.386 sq mi or 247 acres) and river estuaries.

Corbeil (French pronunciation: [kɔʁbɛj]) is a commune in the Marne department in north-eastern France.

== Demography ==
Historical population
Year	Pop.	±% p.a.
1968	140	—
1975	133	−0.73%
1982	118	−1.69%
1990	113	−0.54%
1999	104	−0.92%
2007	105	+0.12%
2012	95	−1.98%
2017	92	−0.64%
2023	100	+1.40%
Source: INSEE

== See also ==
- Communes of the Marne department
- Corbeil (disambiguation), for other places with this name
