= Corbeil (surname) =

Corbeil is a surname. Notable people with the surname include:

- Carole Corbeil (1952–2000), Canadian arts critic and novelist
- Chris Corbeil (born 1988), Canadian lacrosse player
- Jean Corbeil (1934–2002), Canadian politician
- Jean-Claude Corbeil (born 1932), Canadian linguist and lexicographer
- Jean Jacques Corbeil, French Canadian missionary
- Josée Corbeil (born 1973), Canadian volleyball player
- Normand Corbeil (1956–2013), Canadian composer
- Pierre Corbeil (born 1955), Canadian politician and dentist
- Yves Corbeil (born 1944), Canadian actor and television host

== See also ==
- Charlotte Corbeil-Coleman, Canadian actor and playwright
- Mathieu Corbeil-Thériault (born 1991), Canadian ice hockey player
