= Jean Colombier =

French writer

Jean Colombier (born 25 December 1945 in Saint-Yrieix-sous-Aixe) is a French writer, laureate of the 1990 edition of the Prix Renaudot.

== Work ==
Novels

- Les Matins céladon (1988)
- Les Frères Romance (1990), Calmann-Lévy publishing house – Prix Renaudot
- Béloni (1992)
- Villa Mathilde (1994)
- J'ai trop regardé les étoiles (1999)
- La Théorie des pénitents (2006)
- DCD (2009)

Short stories

- La Gra birtjdnde Boucle (1996), collective work
- Drôle d'oiseau (1997), collective work
- Rencontres ovales (2004), collective work
- Nos terres de rugby (2007), collective work
- Le Cantique de Billie (2008)
- Balade en Limousin (2009), collective work

Art books

- La Haute-Vienne (1994)
- Les Frères Romance (1990)
