= Colombier, Loire =

Colombier
- Commune
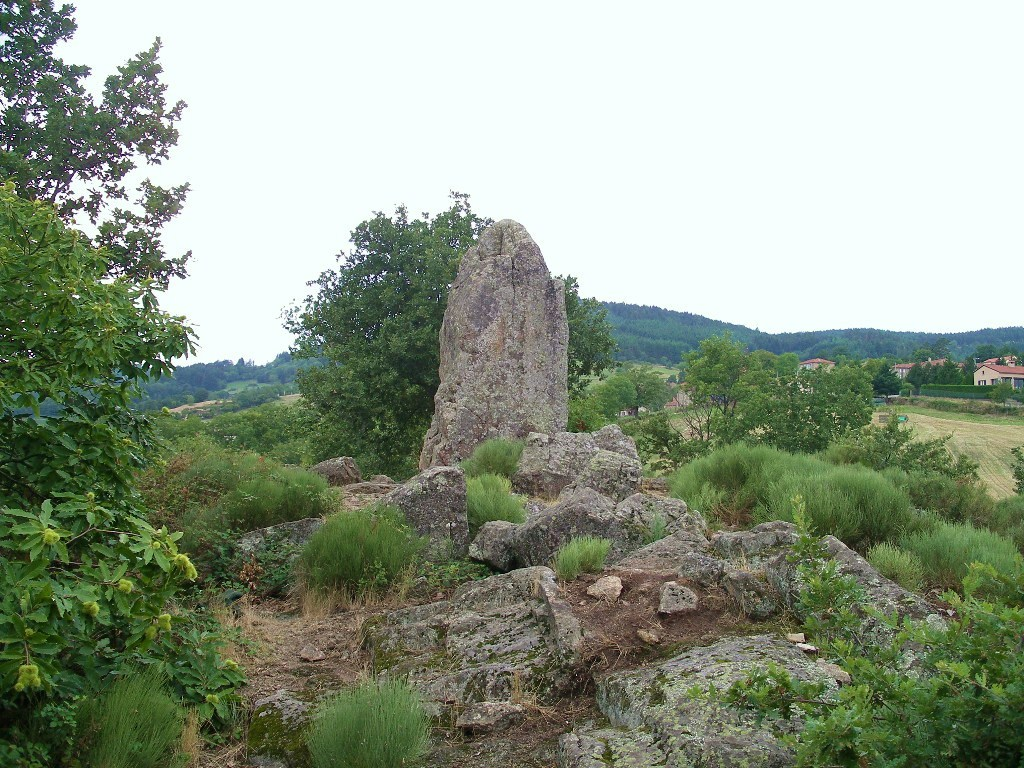
- Menhir
- Location of Colombier
- Location within France Location within Auvergne-Rhône-Alpes
- Coordinates: 45°20′19″N 4°36′02″E
- Country: France
- Region: Auvergne-Rhône-Alpes
- Department: Loire
- Arrondissement: Saint-Étienne
- Canton: Le Pilat
- Intercommunality: Monts du Pilat

Government
  - Mayor (2020–2026): Jean-Paul Vallot
- Area^{1}: 17.86 km^{2} (6.90 sq mi)
- Elevation: 818 m (2,684 ft)
- Highest elevation: 1,429 m (4,688 ft)
- Lowest elevation: 649 m (2,129 ft)
- Population (2023): 294
  - Density: 16.5/km^{2} (42.6/sq mi)
- Time zone: UTC+01:00 (CET)
  - Summer (DST): UTC+02:00 (CEST)
- INSEE/Postal code: 42067 /42220
- ^{1} French Land Register data, which excludes lakes, ponds, glaciers > 1 km^{2} (0.386 sq mi or 247 acres) and river estuaries.

Colombier is a commune in the Loire department in central France.

== Population ==
Historical population
Year	Pop.	±% p.a.
1968	303	—
1975	255	−2.43%
1982	253	−0.11%
1990	237	−0.81%
1999	269	+1.42%
2007	300	+1.37%
2012	299	−0.07%
2017	305	+0.40%
2023	294	−0.61%
Source: INSEE

== See also ==
- Communes of the Loire department
