= Diocese of Évry-Corbeil-Essonnes =

Catholic diocese in France

Coordinates: 48°37′25″N 2°25′43″E

Diocese of Evry–Corbeil-Essonnes Dioecesis Evriensis–Corbiliensis-Exonensis Diocèse d'Evry–Corbeil-Essonnes

Catholic
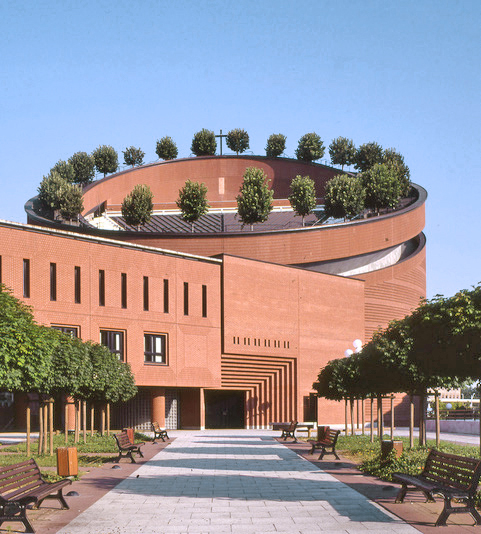
- Évry Cathedral of the Resurrection

Location
- Country: France
- Ecclesiastical province: Paris
- Metropolitan: Archdiocese of Paris

Statistics
- Area: 1,819 km^{2} (702 sq mi)
- Population: Total; Catholics: (as of 2021); 1,296,130 (est.); 897,900 (est.) (69.3%)
- Parishes: 102

Information
- Denomination: Roman Catholic
- Sui iuris church: Latin Church
- Rite: Roman Rite
- Established: 9 October 1966
- Cathedral: Cathedral of the Resurrection and St. Corbinian in Évry
- Co-cathedral: Cathedral of Saint Spire in Corbeil-Essonnes
- Secular priests: 99 (Diocesan); 32 (Religious Orders); 41 Permanent Deacons

Current leadership
- Pope: Leo XIV
- Bishop: Michel Pansard
- Metropolitan Archbishop: Laurent Ulrich
- Bishops emeritus: Michel Dubost

Map

Website
- Website of the Diocese (in French)

The Diocese of Évry–Corbeil-Essonnes (Latin: Dioecesis Evriensis–Corbiliensis-Exonensis; French: Diocèse d'Evry–Corbeil-Essonnes) is a Latin diocese of the Catholic Church in France. Erected in 1966 as the Diocese of Corbeil, the diocese was split off from the Diocese of Versailles. In 1988, the diocese was renamed to the Diocese of Évry–Corbeil-Essonnes. Currently the diocese remains a suffragan of the Archdiocese of Paris.

The current bishop is Michel Armand Alexis Jean Pansard who was appointed on 1 August 2017 by Pope Francis.

== History ==
In 1964, the French government created five new departments in the Île-de-France.

The diocese of Corbeil was created by Pope Paul VI on 9 October 1966, in the bull "Qui Volente Deo." The collegiate church of Saint Exuperius (Saint-Spire) was designated as the new cathedral of the diocese.

In 1988, recognizing the fact that the population had grown in the direction of Evry, some 4 km (2.5 mi) to the north, and that the municipal offices were situated there, the bishop of Corbeil requested a change in name of the diocese to acknowledge the fact. On 11 June 1888, the Congregation of Bishops in the papal curia granted the petition, with the name «Evriensis-Corbiliensis-Exonensis» (Évry-Corbeil-Essonnes).

=== Saint Spire, patron and abbey ===
The patron saint of the diocese is Exuperius of Bayeux, whose remains were transferred to Corbeil in 863, during the Viking incursions. They were removed and the head was burned in 1564 by the Huguenots, and the rest in 1794 during the French Revolution; an alternative narrative has them thrown into the Seine during the French Revolution. His feast day is 1 August.

There was a monastery of Saint Exuperius in Corbeil, founded in the 10th century. The church possessed canons, who, in 1070, had been despoiled of their possessions; Bouchard II, the sixth count of Corbeil, guaranteed to protect them from all external domination, and assigned them their own territory. He specified, however, that they were to live together in a new cloister under the spiritual jurisdiction of an abbot, where they would be exempt from imposts, though subject to the criminal jurisdiction of the bishop and archdeacon. The monastery was presided over by the abbot, the cantor, two provosts, and at least eight canons. There was also a chevecier (capicerius, cavicerius), who held the keys of the treasury.

When the County of Corbeil was acquired by King Louis VI of France (1108–1137), patronage of the monastery passed to the king. The old church was destroyed by a fire c. 1140, and was rebuilt in the second half of the 12th century. On 1 February 1196, Pope Celestine III, in a letter to Abbot Hugo and the canons, took the church of Saint-Spire under his protection, and enumerated in his bull its privileges and possessions.

On 10 October 1437, Bishop Jean l'Eguisé of Troyes conducted a new dedication of Saint-Spire.

The Chapter of Saint-Spire was united with that of the collegiate church of Nôtre-Dame-de-Corbeil on 15 September 1601.

All Chapters and colleges were disbanded by order of the National Constituent Assembly in July 1790, in the Civil Constitution of the Clergy. After the Restoration, Saint-Spire was the only church left in Corbeil, and it became the one parish church.

=== New cathedral in Évry ===
It was realized from the beginning of the diocese in 1966 that the new cathedral was inadequate both in capacity and in layout for episcopal functions. Initial studies for a cathedral began in 1988. Fundraising began in 1989. The new Cathedral was funded by contributions from more than 200,000 donors. Other major contributors included a national fund created between the two World Wars for the reconstruction of religious structures destroyed in the Paris region, a major contribution from the Diocese of Freising-Munich, Germany, and public agencies in the Île-de-France region.

Initial studies were carried out the same year, and the first stone was laid at Easter of 1991. Construction began in 1992 and was completed in 1995. The first mass was held in that year. The cathedral was formally consecrated on May 2, 1996.

== Bishops ==
- (1966–1977) : Albert-Georges-Yves Malbois
- (1978–2000) : Guy Alexis Herbulot
- (2000–2017) : Michel Dubost, C.I.M.
- (2017 – ) : Michel Armand Alexis Jean Pansard

== See also ==
- Catholic Church in France
- List of Catholic dioceses in France
