= Virelade =

- Commune
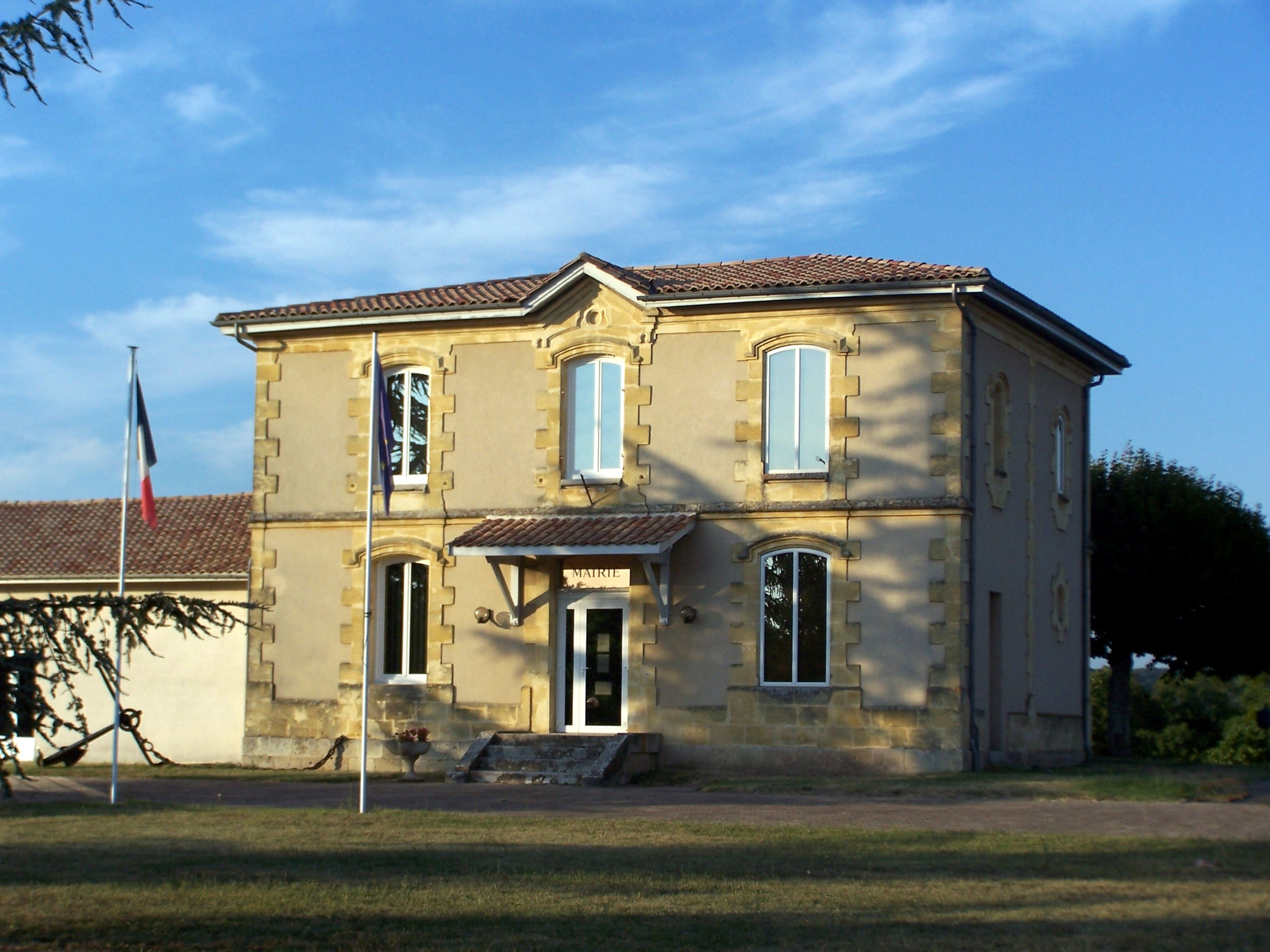
- The town hall in Virelade

- Coat of arms
- Location of Virelade
- Location within France Location within Nouvelle-Aquitaine
- Coordinates: 44°40′01″N 0°22′50″W
- Country: France
- Region: Nouvelle-Aquitaine
- Department: Gironde
- Arrondissement: Langon
- Canton: Les Landes des Graves
- Intercommunality: Convergence Garonne

Government
  - Mayor (2023–2026): Laetitia Faubet
- Area^{1}: 13.41 km^{2} (5.18 sq mi)
- Elevation: 18 m (59 ft)
- Highest elevation: 31 m (102 ft)
- Lowest elevation: 4 m (13 ft)
- Population (2023): 1,124
  - Density: 83.82/km^{2} (217.1/sq mi)
- Time zone: UTC+01:00 (CET)
  - Summer (DST): UTC+02:00 (CEST)
- INSEE/Postal code: 33552 /33720
- ^{1} French Land Register data, which excludes lakes, ponds, glaciers > 1 km^{2} (0.386 sq mi or 247 acres) and river estuaries.

Virelade (French pronunciation: [viʁlad]; Occitan: Viralada) is a commune in the Gironde department in Nouvelle-Aquitaine in southwestern France.

== Population ==
Historical population
Year	Pop.	±% p.a.
1968	559	—
1975	646	+2.09%
1982	727	+1.70%
1990	734	+0.12%
1999	749	+0.23%
2007	875	+1.96%
2012	959	+1.85%
2017	1,062	+2.06%
2023	1,124	+0.95%
Source: INSEE

== See also ==
- Communes of the Gironde department
