= Corbeil Cathedral =

Roman Catholic church in Corbeil-Essonnes, France

Coordinates: 48°36′42.70″N 2°28′57.60″E

Corbeil Cathedral Cathédrale Saint-Spire de Corbeil
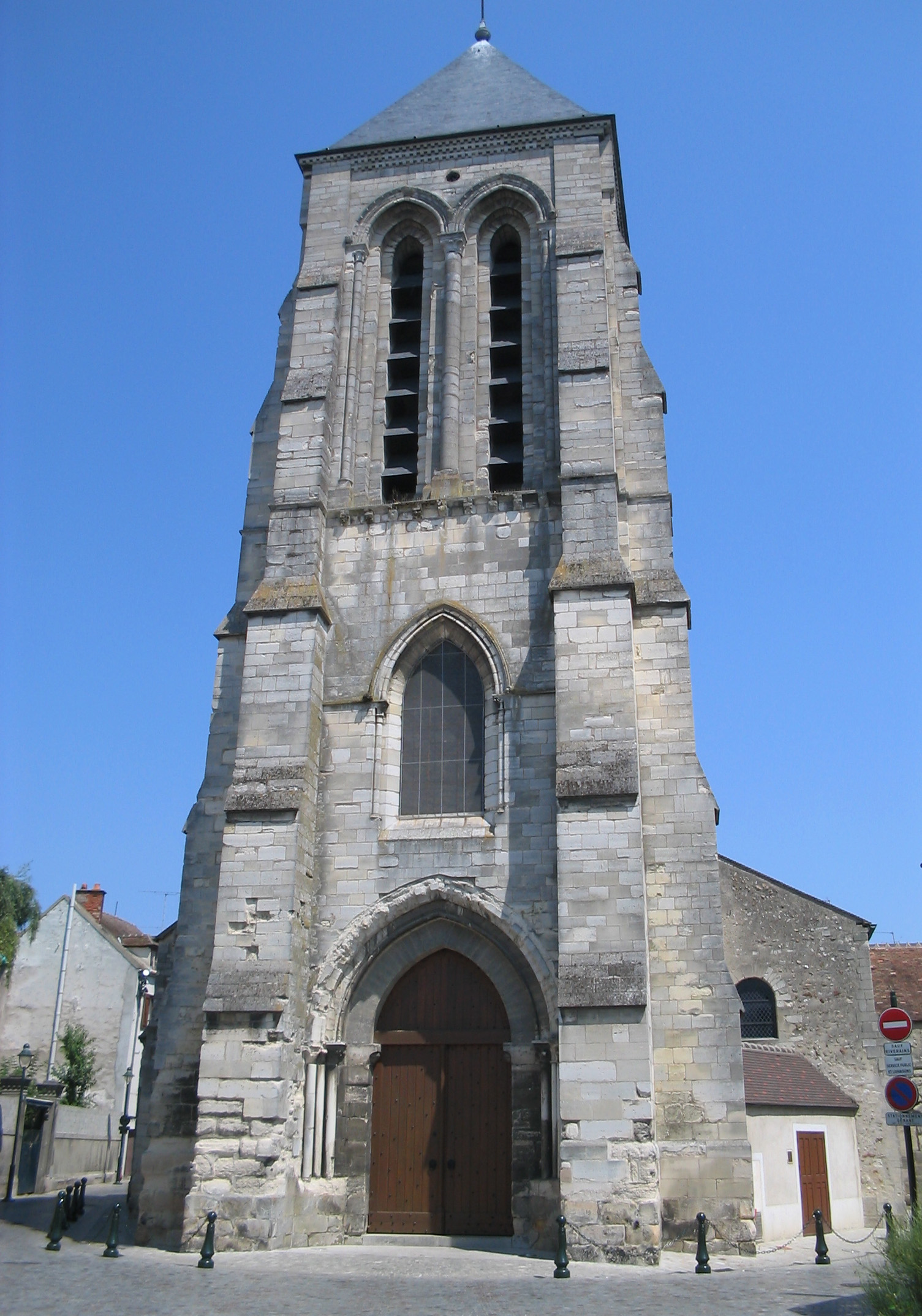
- Corbeil Cathedral

Religion
- Affiliation: Roman Catholic Church
- Province: Roman Catholic Diocese of Évry–Corbeil-Essonnes
- Region: Essonne
- Rite: Roman
- Ecclesiastical or organisational status: Cathedral
- Status: Active

Location
- Location: Corbeil-Essonnes, France
- Interactive map of Corbeil Cathedral; Cathédrale Saint-Spire de Corbeil

Architecture
- Type: church
- Style: Romanesque

Corbeil Cathedral (French: Cathédrale Saint-Spire de Corbeil) is a Roman Catholic church located in the town of Corbeil-Essonnes, France. It was the interim cathedral of the Roman Catholic Diocese of Évry–Corbeil-Essonnes, in which it is now a co-cathedral. The dedication is to Saint Spire or Spirius, which is a corruption of Saint Exuperius.

The bishop's seat was established at the foundation of the new diocese in 1966 in the parish church of Saint Spire in Corbeil, an ancient collegiate church, which thus became the cathedral. The facilities were however inadequate for the needs of an episcopal administration, and the new town of Évry was chosen as a better-situated new episcopal centre, although entirely lacking in any suitable church building. The purpose-built cathedral at Évry was therefore commissioned, and opened in 1995, superseding Saint Spire as the cathedral of the diocese.

== Sources ==
- Cathédrale d'Évry unofficial website: history, including the predecessor cathedral at Corbeil (in French)
- Catholique.fr: Secteur Corbeil-Saint-Germain: Cathédrale Saint-Spire de Corbeil (in French)
