= Buse Coskun =

Turkish figure skater

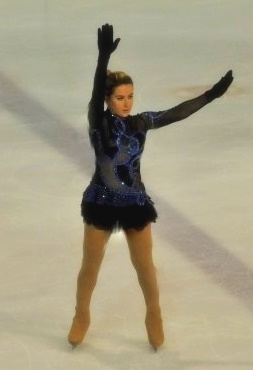
- Coskun in 2011

Personal information
- Born: 26 May 1989 (age 37) Istanbul, Turkey
- Height: 1.59 m (5 ft 2 1/2 in)

Figure skating career
- Country: Turkey
- Coach: Cenk Ertaul
- Skating club: Olimpik 2023
- Began skating: 1996
Medal record
Representing Turkey

Buse Coskun (born 26 May 1989) is a Turkish figure skater. She is a ten-time Turkish medalist.She represented Turkey at the Netherlands 2004 World Junior Figure Skating Championships and placed 46th, at the Germany 2004 Pokal der Blauen Schwerter Chemnitz ISU Junior Grand Prix in Germany and placed 37th place, at the 7th European Youth Olympic Festival were only held in junior single skating categories in Monthey, Switzerland, between January 22 and January 29 Youth Olympic Winter games and placed 22nd place, at the 2006 World Junior Figure Skating Championships in Ljubliana and placed 25th place.

== Career ==
Coskun started skating at the age of 6 with her kindergarten class, at the skating rink in the Galleria shopping mall of Istanbul. The rink was not of professional quality so Buse experienced difficulties in her training. At 9, she competed for the first time internationally for Turkey.

Istanbul had no olympic ice rink then, and no professional skating coaches. She had to do training in the 600 square meter Galleria Ice Rink. From 1998 to 2010, she represented Turkey in international competitions. All skaters continue their lives with an average of 30 hours of weekly training but Buse Coskun tried to pursue sports career working 3 hours a week in shopping mall. In 2003, she won a silver medal at the Golden Bear of Zagreb 2003 after gold medalist Yuna Kim. Because Turkey had only two ice rinks, Coskun travelled to Kocaeli Province for training in the early morning and then returned to Istanbul to attend school.

At the 2011 Erzurum University Championships, Coskun served as a speaker and commentator on the TRT channel. She is now an assistant coach at Olimpik Sport Club 2023 with her coach Cenk Ertaul and former national skater Renk Kemaloglu.

== Results ==
International
| Event | 99–00 | 00–01 | 01–02 | 02–03 | 03–04 | 04–05 | 05–06 | 06–07 | 07–08 | 08–09 |
|---|---|---|---|---|---|---|---|---|---|---|
| Copenhagen Trophy | | | 23rd | | | | | | | |
| Triglav Trophy | | | | | | | | | 12th | |
International: Junior and novice
| Junior Worlds | | | | | 46th | 37th | | | | |
| JGP Germany | | | | | | | 37th | | | |
| EYOF | | | | | | 22nd | | | | |
| Golden Bear | | | | | 2nd N | 7th J | | | | |
| Triglav Trophy | | 28th N | | 21st N | 22nd J | | | | | |
| Silver Cup | | | | | | 2nd J | | | | |
National
| Turkish Champ. | 4th | 3rd | 1st | 1st | 3rd | 2nd | 1st | 1st | 2nd | 1st |
| Turkish Cup | 3rd | 2nd | 1st | 1st | 1st | 3rd | 1st | 2nd | 1st | 1st |
Levels: N = Novice; J = Junior; JGP = Junior Grand Prix; WD = Withdrew
