= Galleria Ice Rink =

Ice hockey rink in Istanbul, Turkey

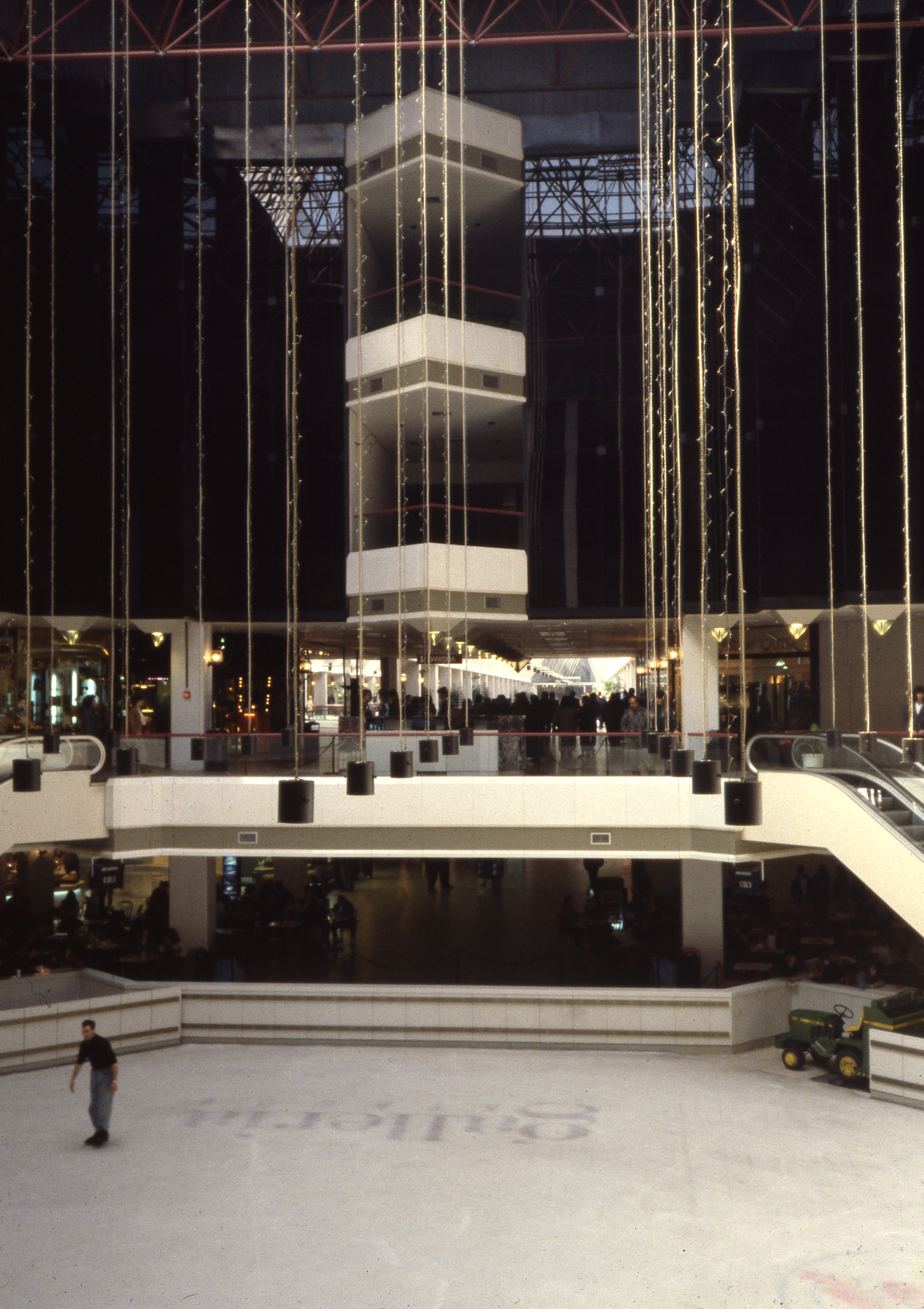
- Galleria Ice Rink
- Interactive map of Galleria Ice Rink
- Full name: Galleria Buz Pisti
- Location: Ataköy, Bakırköy, Istanbul, Turkey
- Coordinates: 40°58′28″N 28°52′11″E
- Owner: Galleria Ataköy
- Operator: Galleria Buz Pateni Pisti

Construction
- Opened: 1989

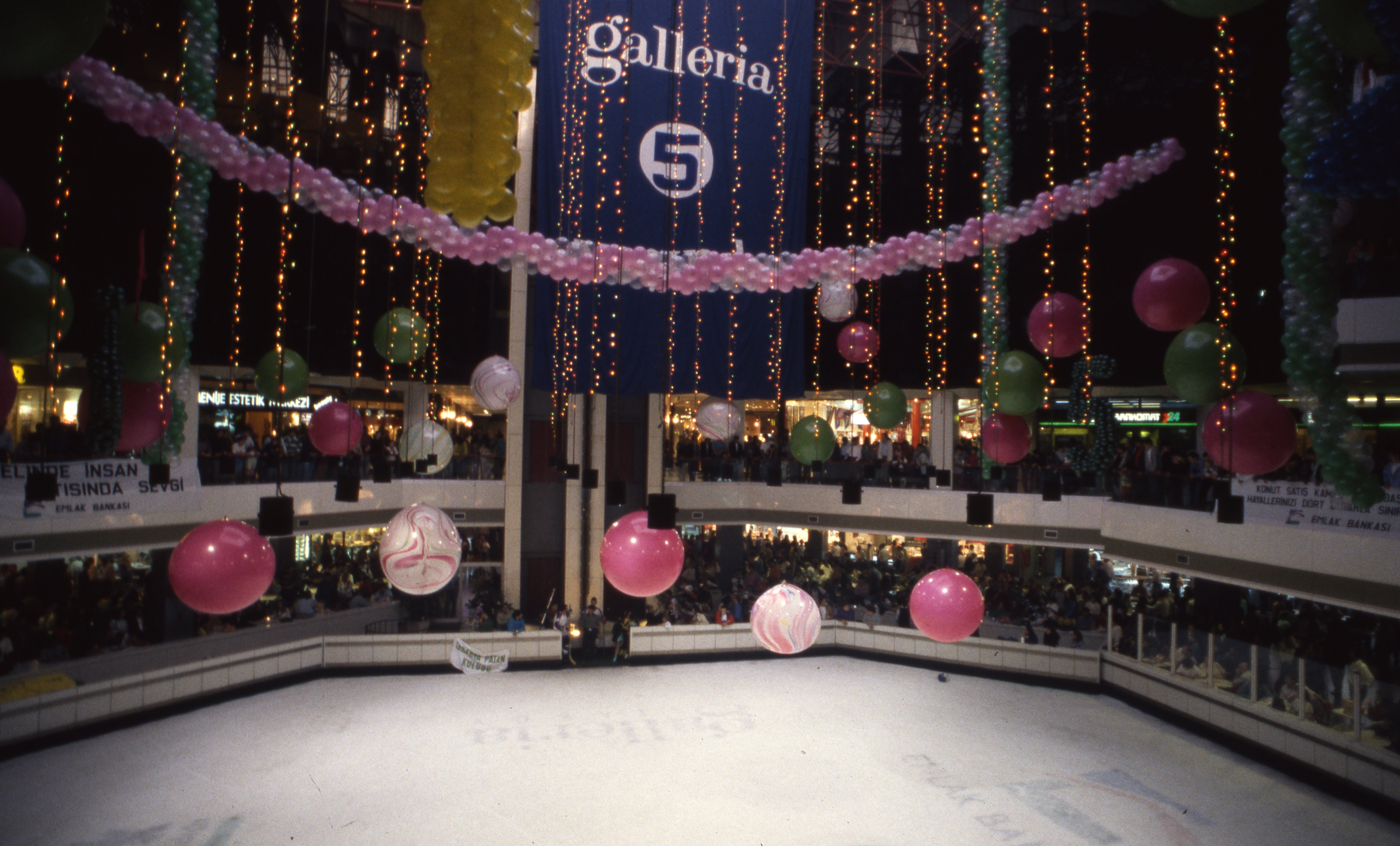
Galleria Ice Rink

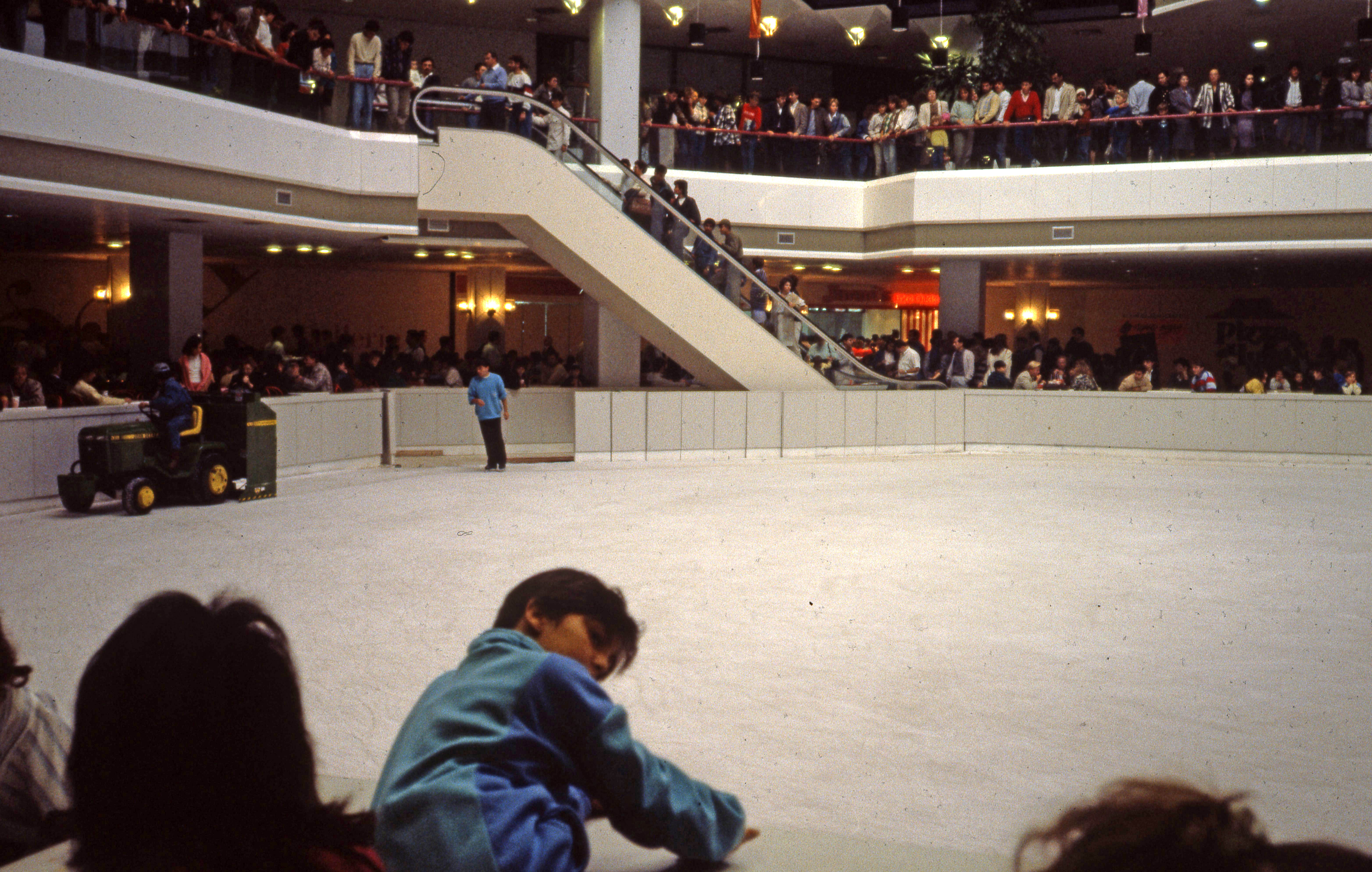
Galleria Ice Rink

Galleria Ice Rink (Turkish: Galleria Buz Pisti) is an indoor ice skating and ice hockey rink located within the Galleria Ataköy shopping center located in Bakırköy district of Istanbul, Turkey. It was opened in 1989. The rink is run by the company "Galleria Buz Pateni Pisti", a subsidiary of the shopping mall.

The venue hosts all kinds of ice sports events in Istanbul including Turkish ice hockey leagues for men's, women's and junior's. It is home to the ice hockey club Istanbul Paten Kulübü.

By April 2010, the director general of the Galleria shopping mall announced that the ice rink will be closed to make space for additional recreational places and new stores within the renovation project of the shopping mall.

== See also ==
- Turkish Ice Hockey Super League
