= Galleria Ataköy =

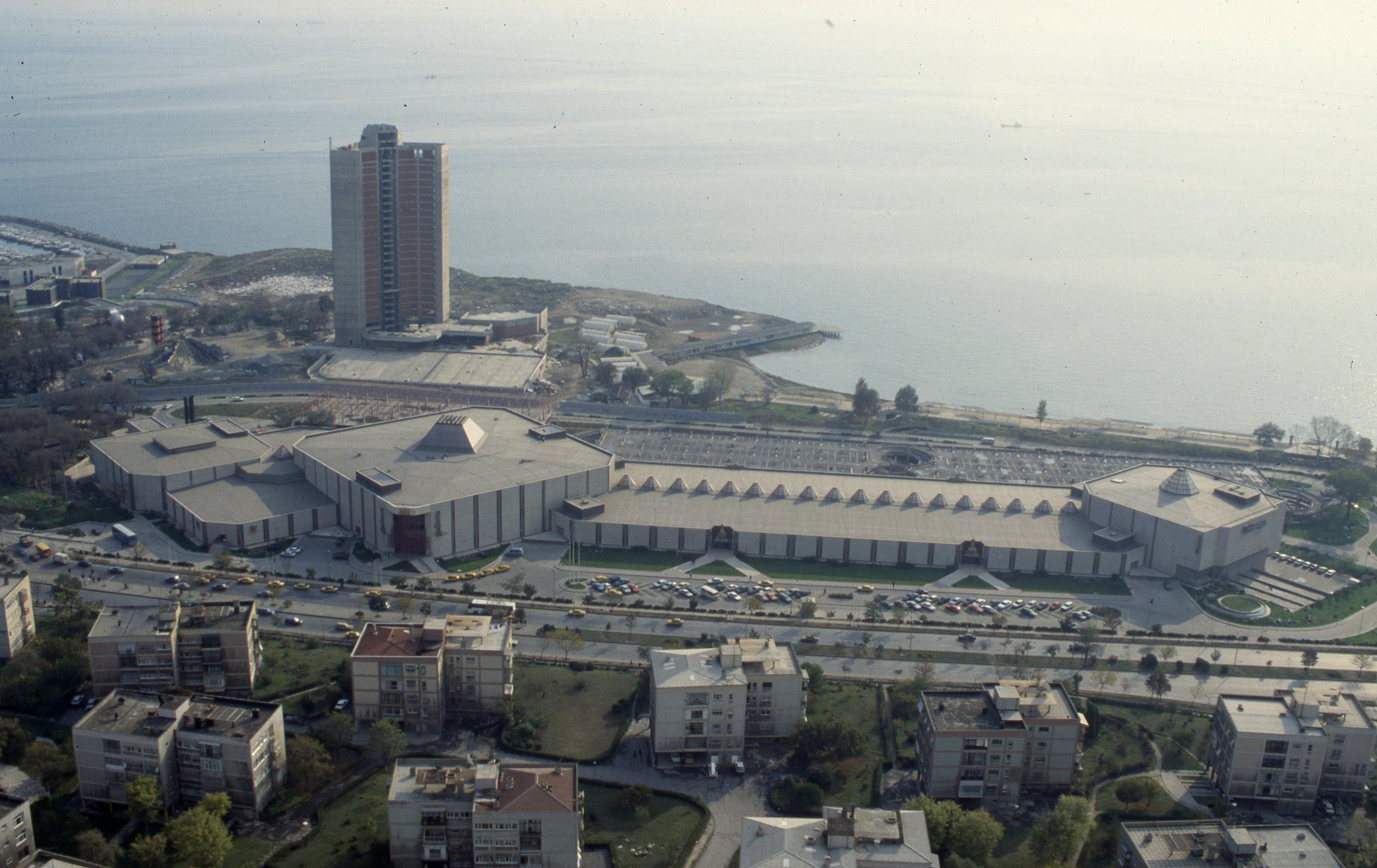
- Galleria building in Ataköy, Istanbul, Turkey
- Location: Ataköy, Istanbul
- Coordinates: 40°58′28″N 28°52′11″E
- Opened: October 1, 1987; 39 years ago
- Num. of stores: 134
- Num. of anchor tenants: 3
- Floor area: 77,906 m^{2} (838,570 sq ft) (total enclosed area)
- Floors: 2

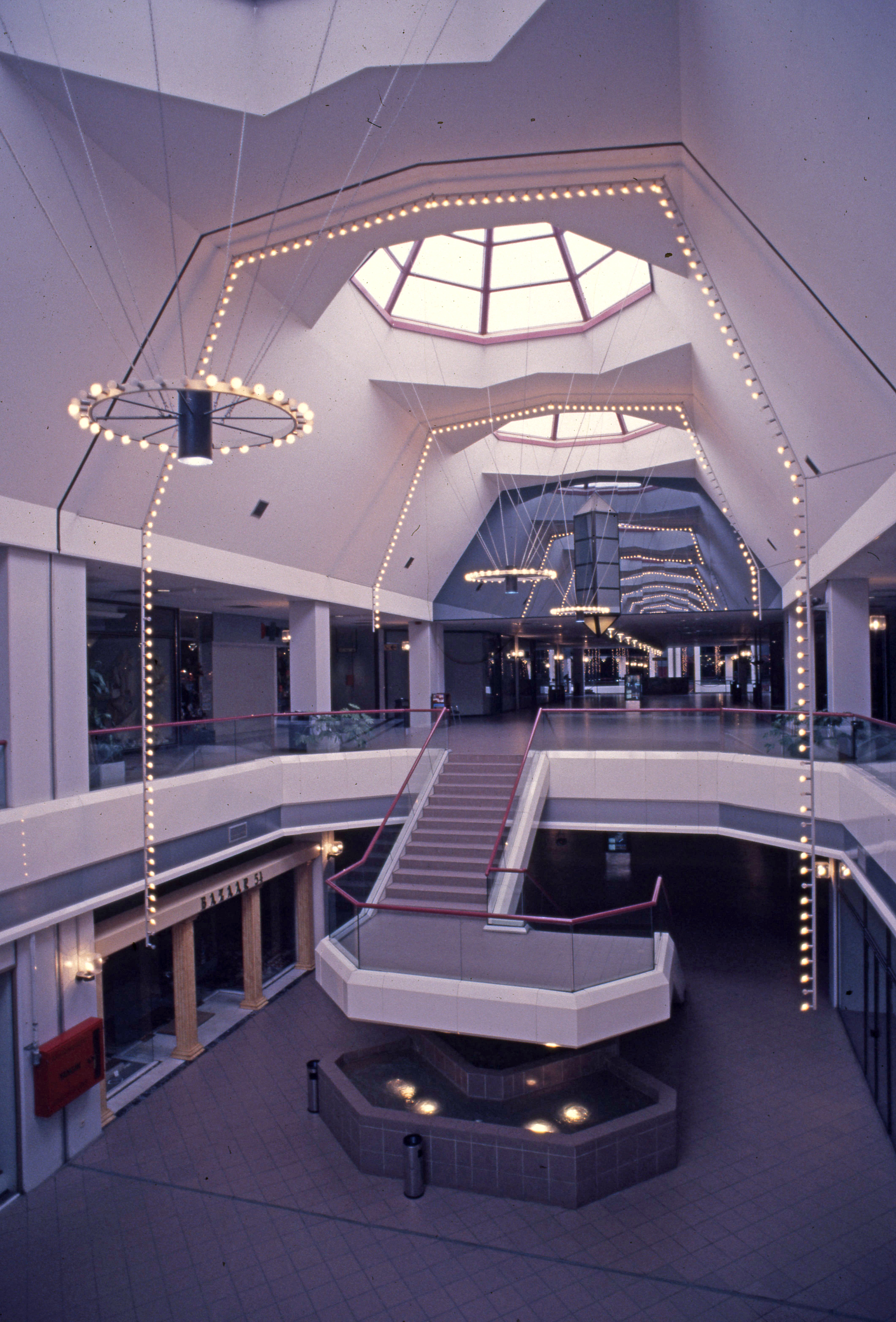
A view from the inside of Galleria Ataköy.

Galleria Ataköy, the first modern shopping mall in Turkey, is situated in the western suburb of Ataköy, Istanbul. It was built following the recommendation of then Prime Minister Turgut Özal, who was inspired by the shopping mall Houston Galleria in Houston, Texas, United States. Galleria Ataköy was opened in 1988 by Turgut Özal.

== History ==
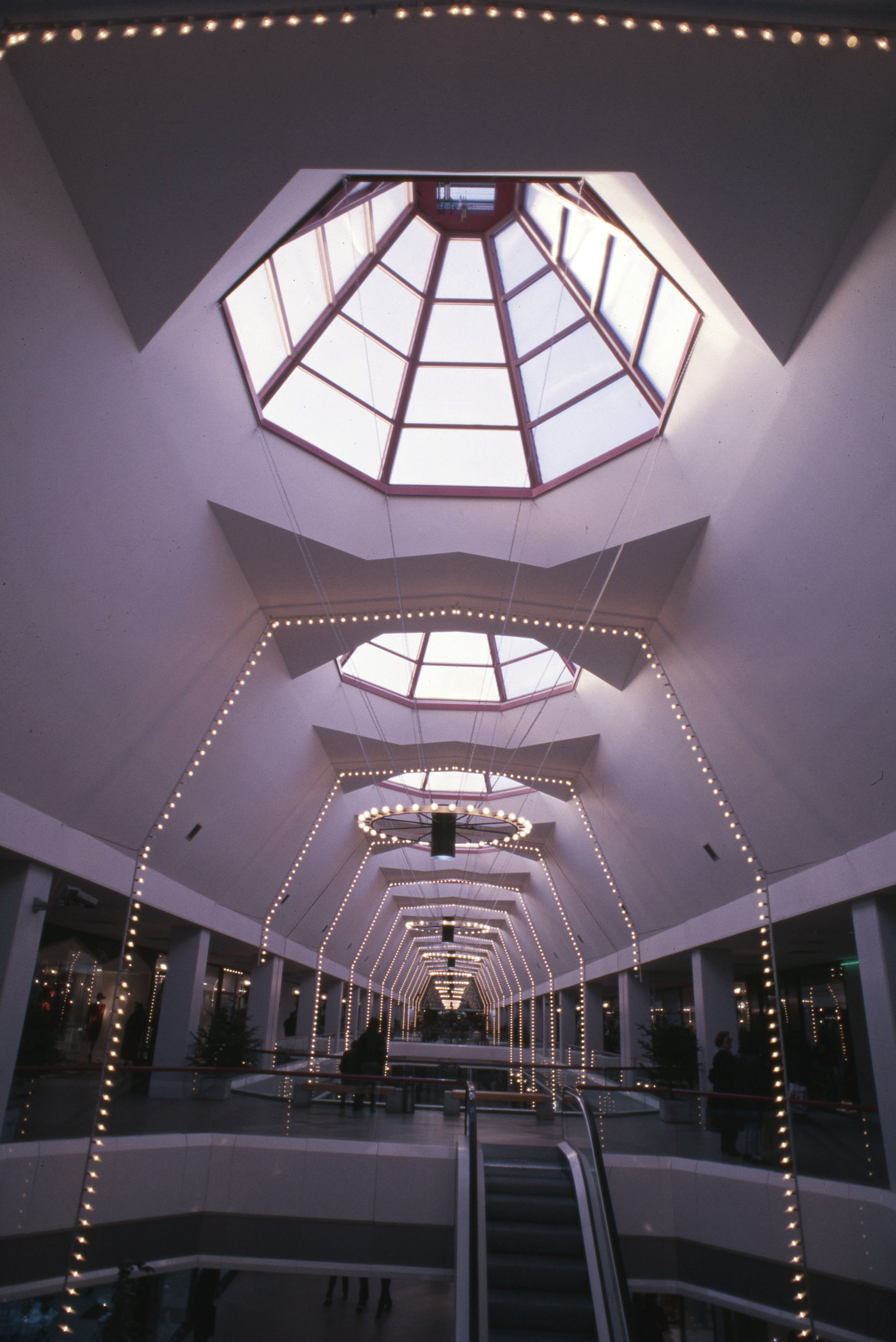
A view from the inside of Galleria Ataköy.

Galleria Ataköy reflected the changing face of Turkey in the late 1980s and became a symbol of modern life with the stores selling a wide range of goods, most of them imported, cafés and restaurants, which made going there a popular day out. At weekends in particular, people rushed to Galleria from all over the city. Due to its close distance to Ataköy Yacht Marina and Atatürk International Airport, Galleria was also very popular for tourists. For several years, Galleria was without any competitor, but it blazed a trail down as other shopping malls were opened in Istanbul.

== Features ==
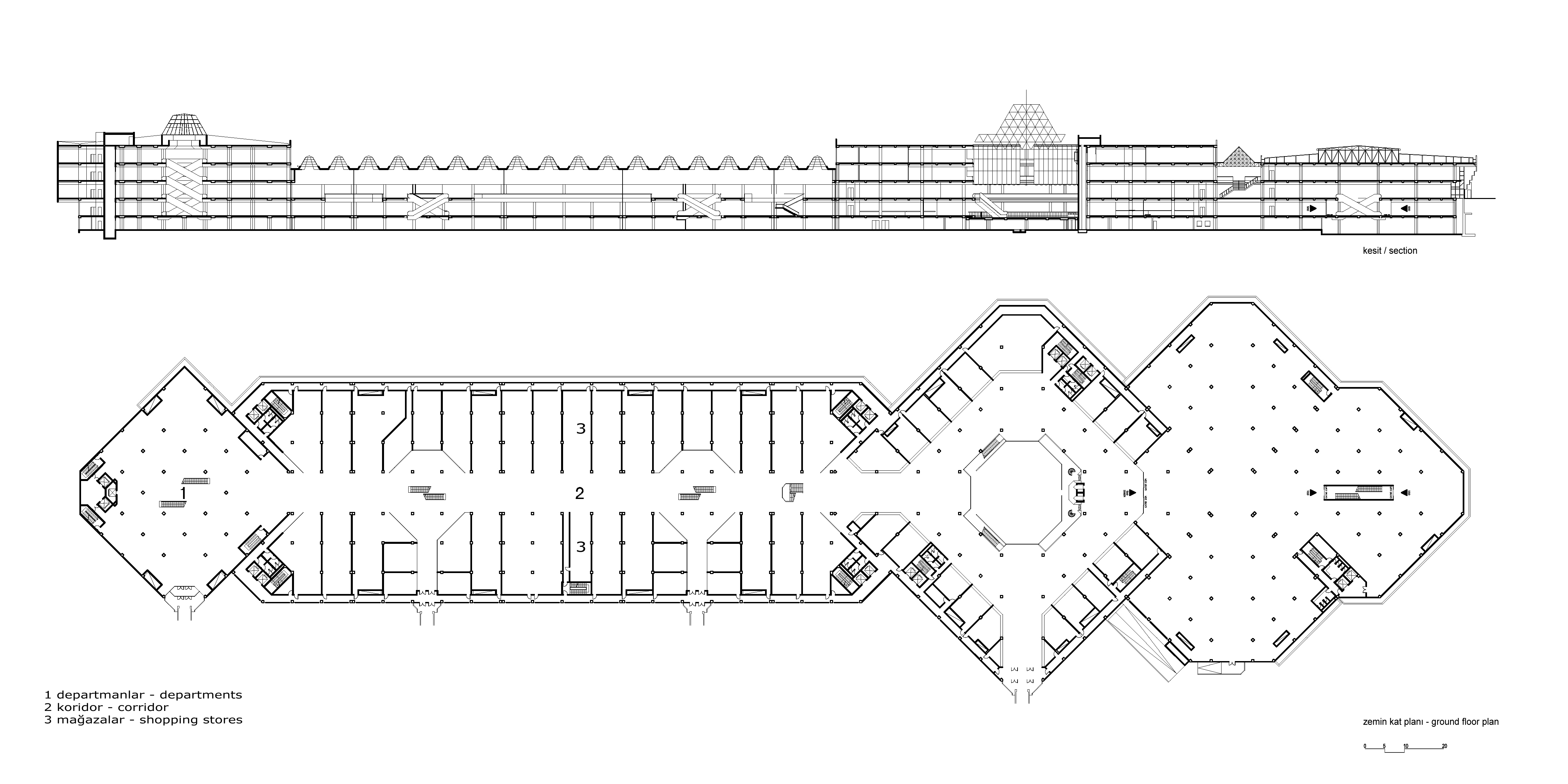
Facility plan of Galleria Ataköy.

Galleria attracts with its 140 stores on two floors an average of 1.2 million visitors monthly. The complex housed Printemps, the renowned French department store, in the beginning. It hosts upscale Turkish stores, features fast food restaurants and cafeterias, entertainment centers, movie theaters, a bowling alley, and an ice skating rink. The shopping mall has a covered car park for 2,000 vehicles.

In 1990, Galleria was judged the world's most outstanding mall by the International Council of Shopping Centers (ICSC) for sophisticated blueprint design, rapid construction, and unique structural features.

Address:
Sahilyolu, Ataköy - Bakırköy
Istanbul

== Gallery ==
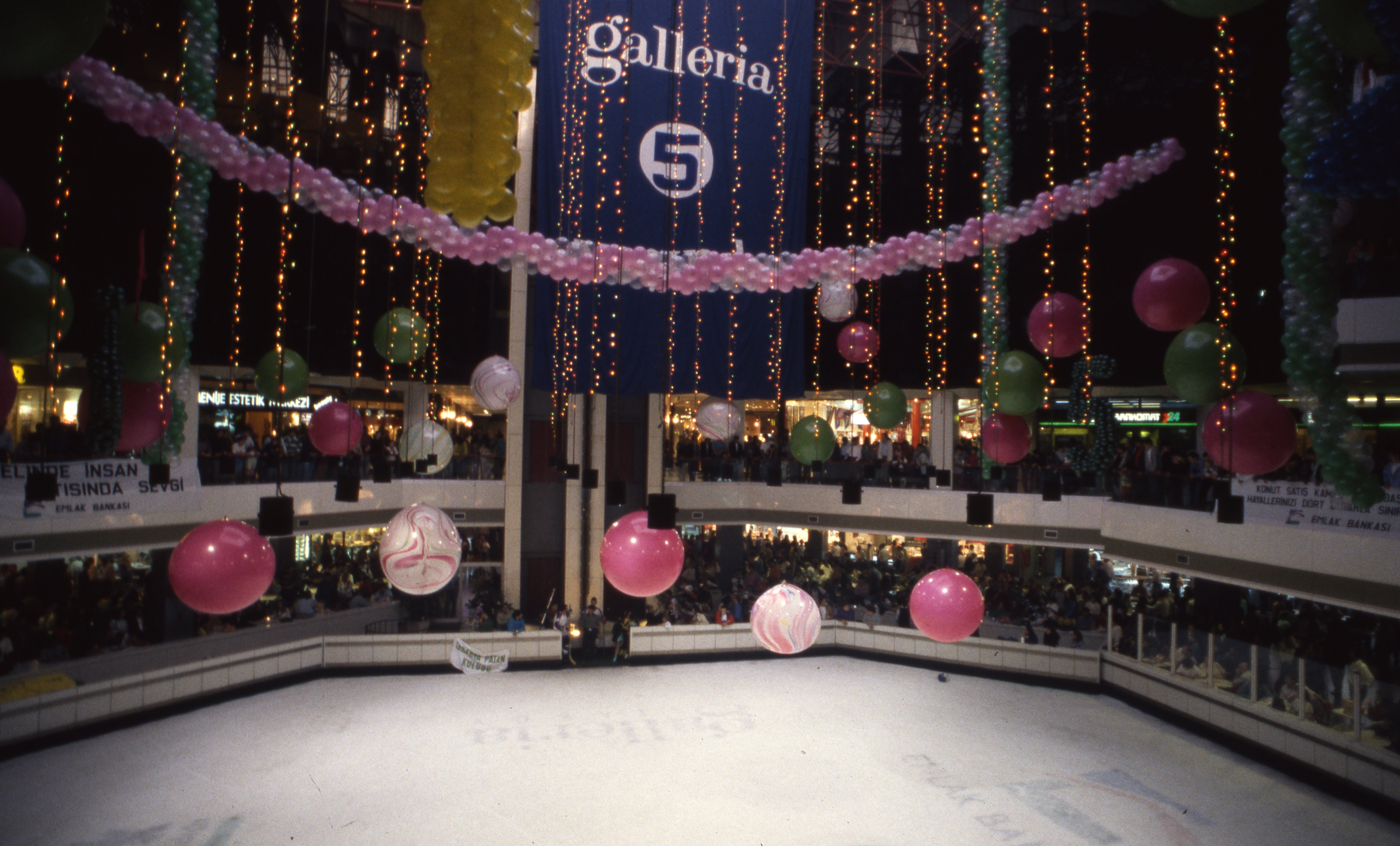

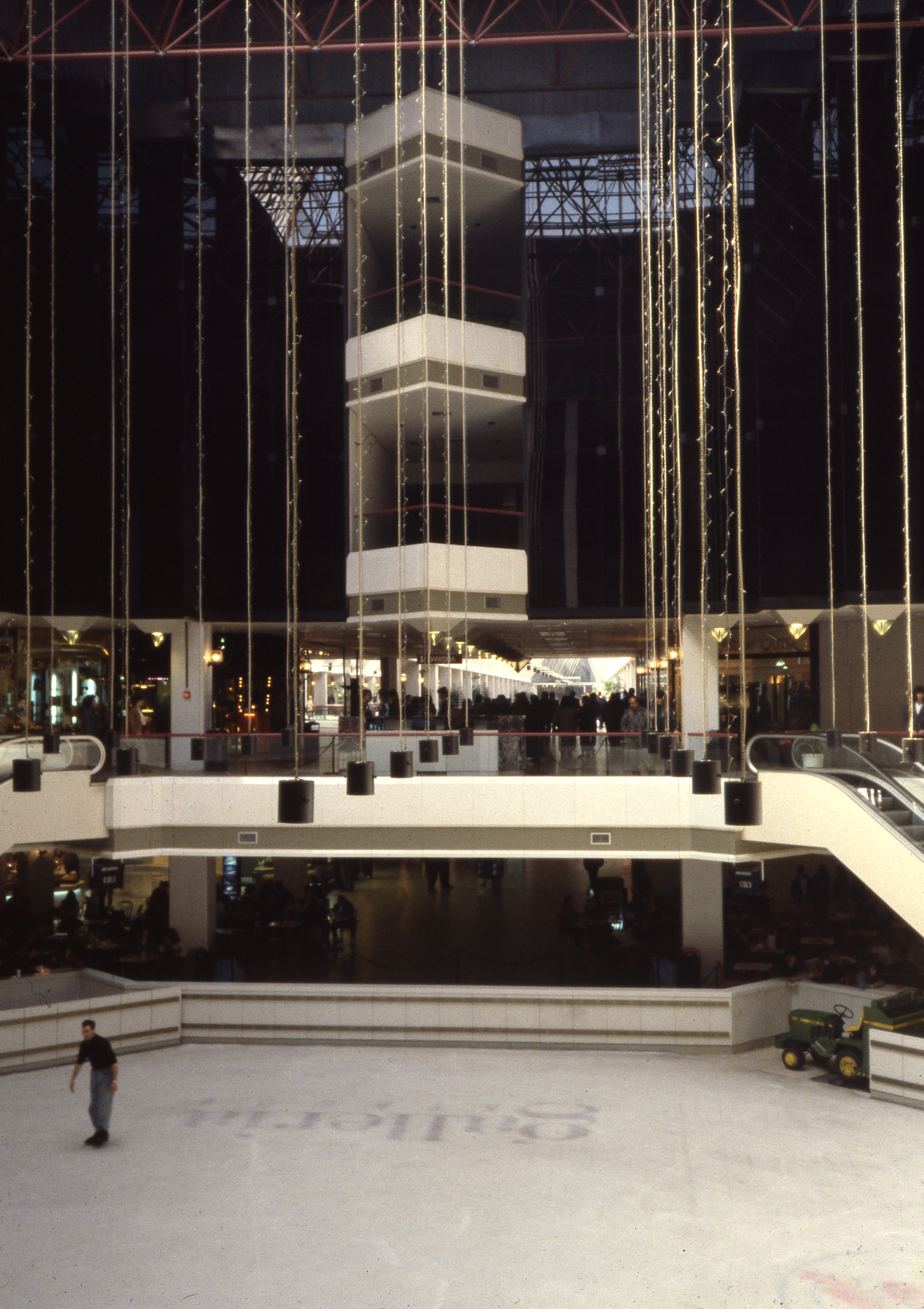

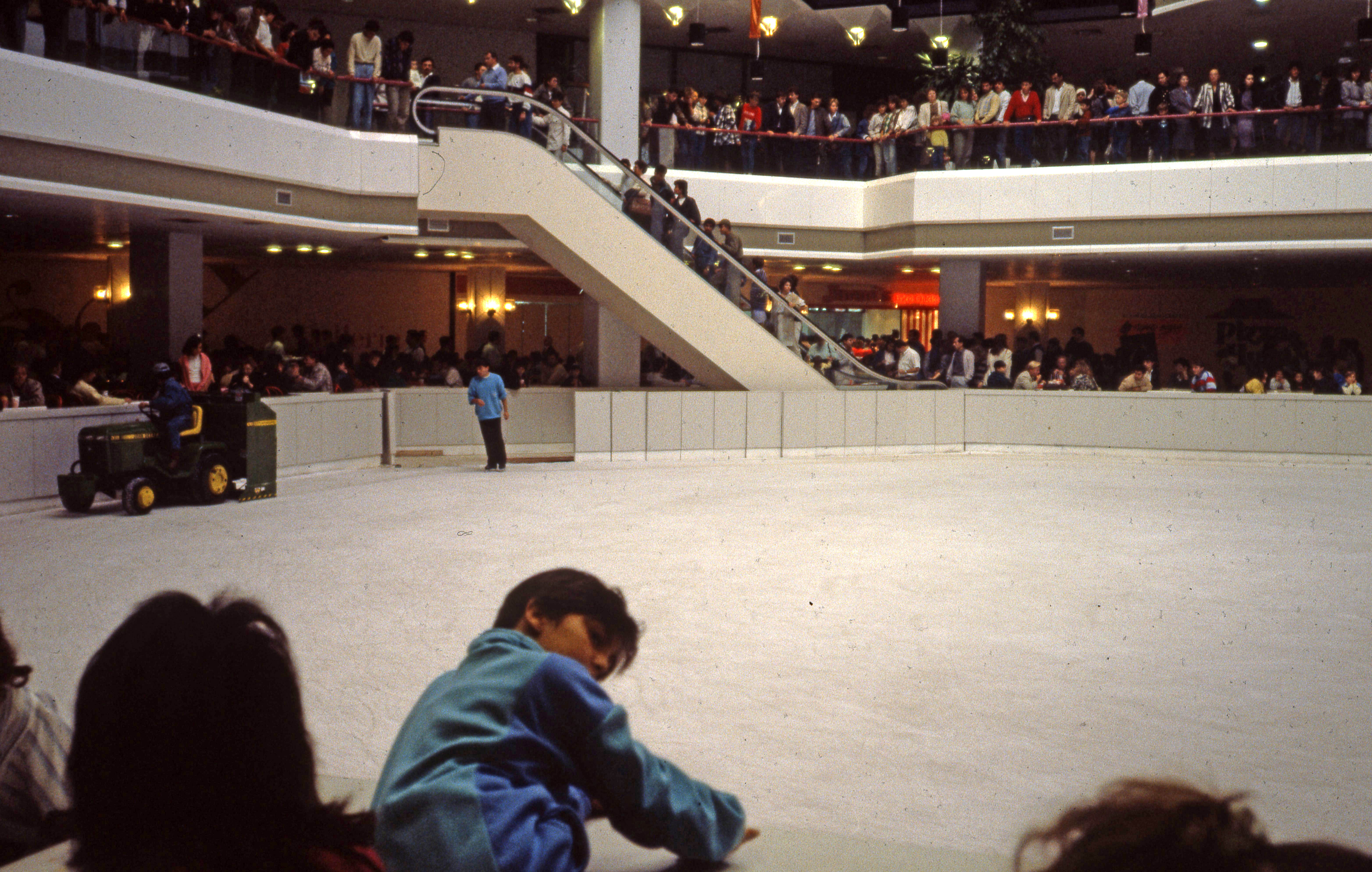

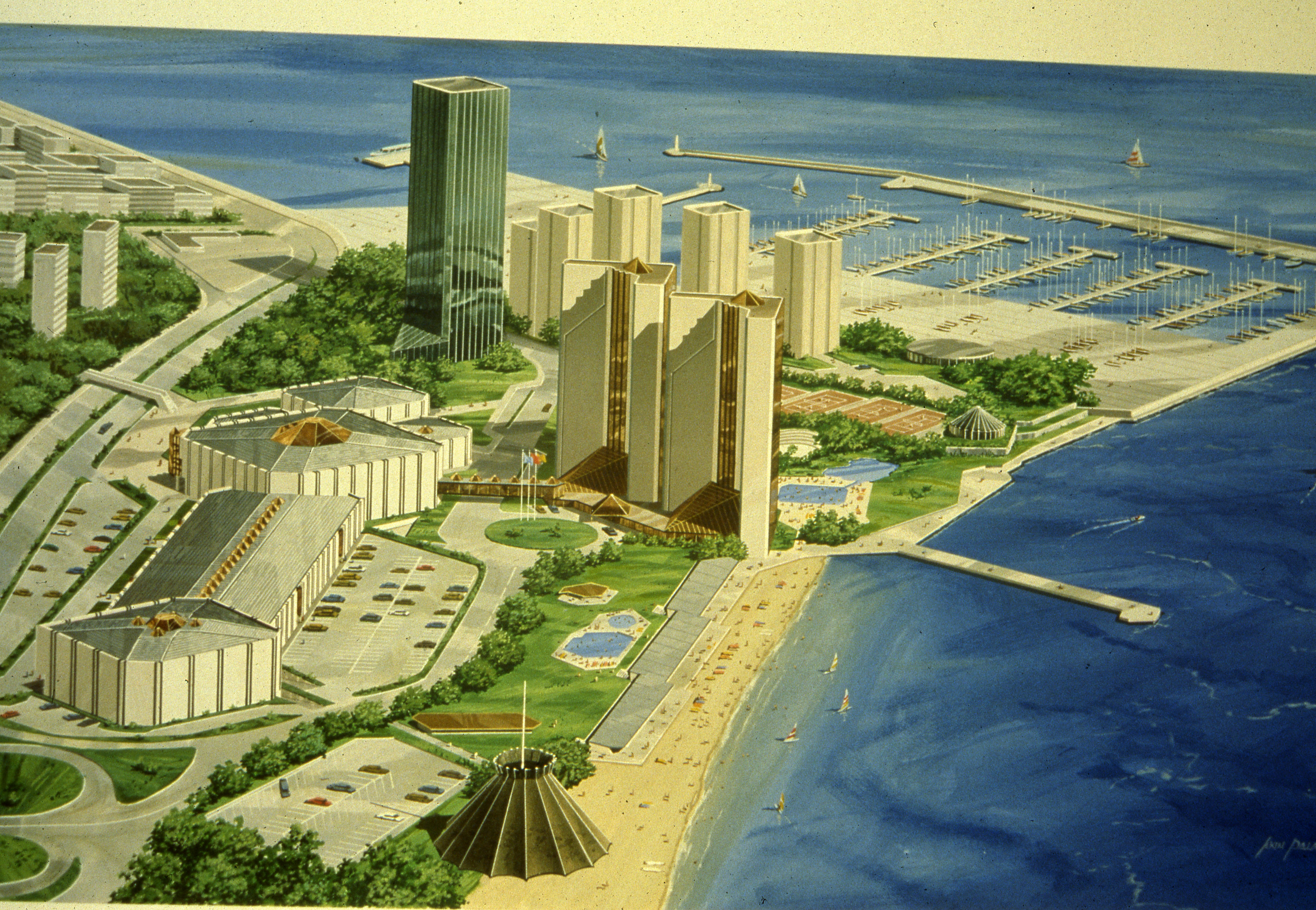

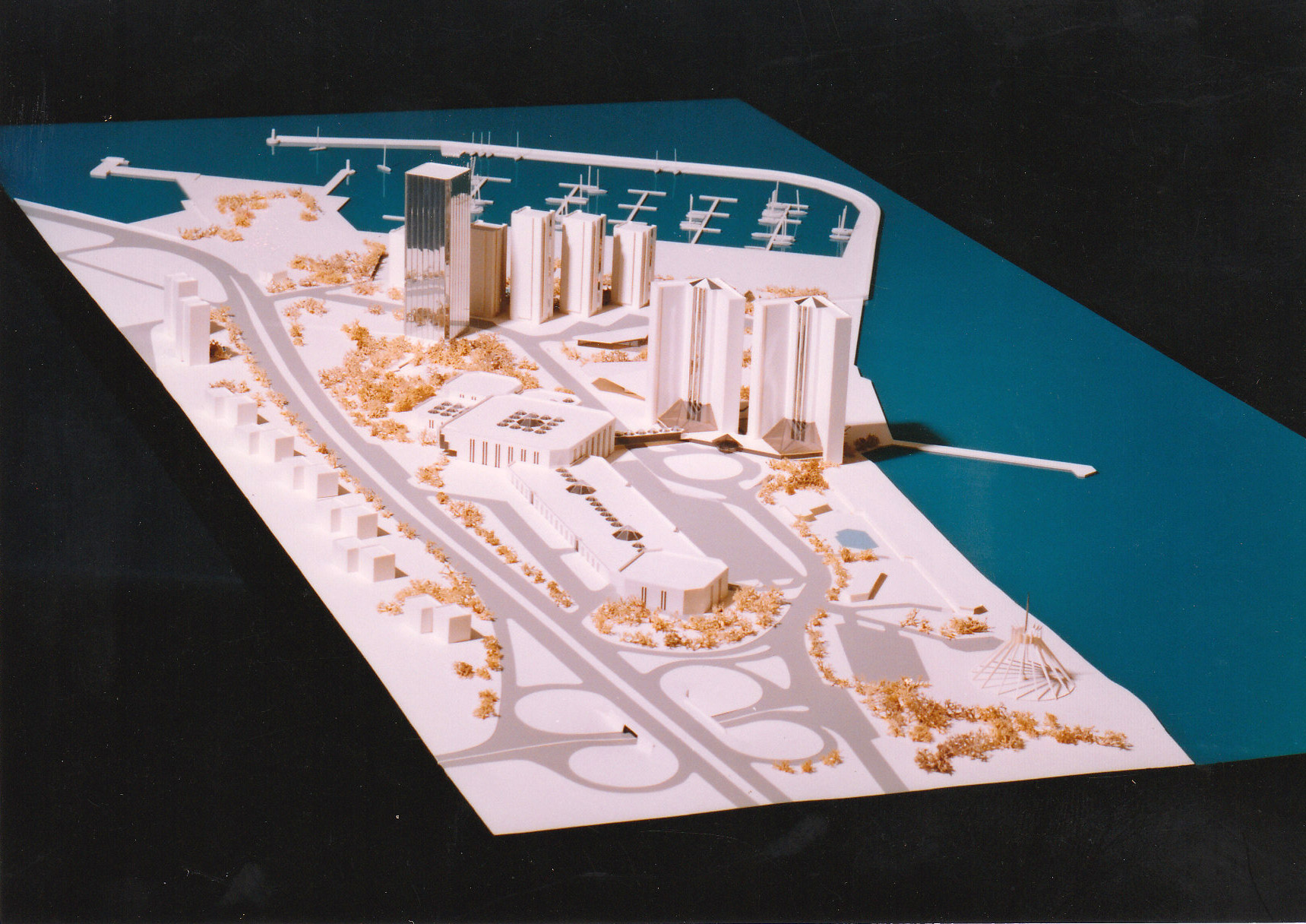

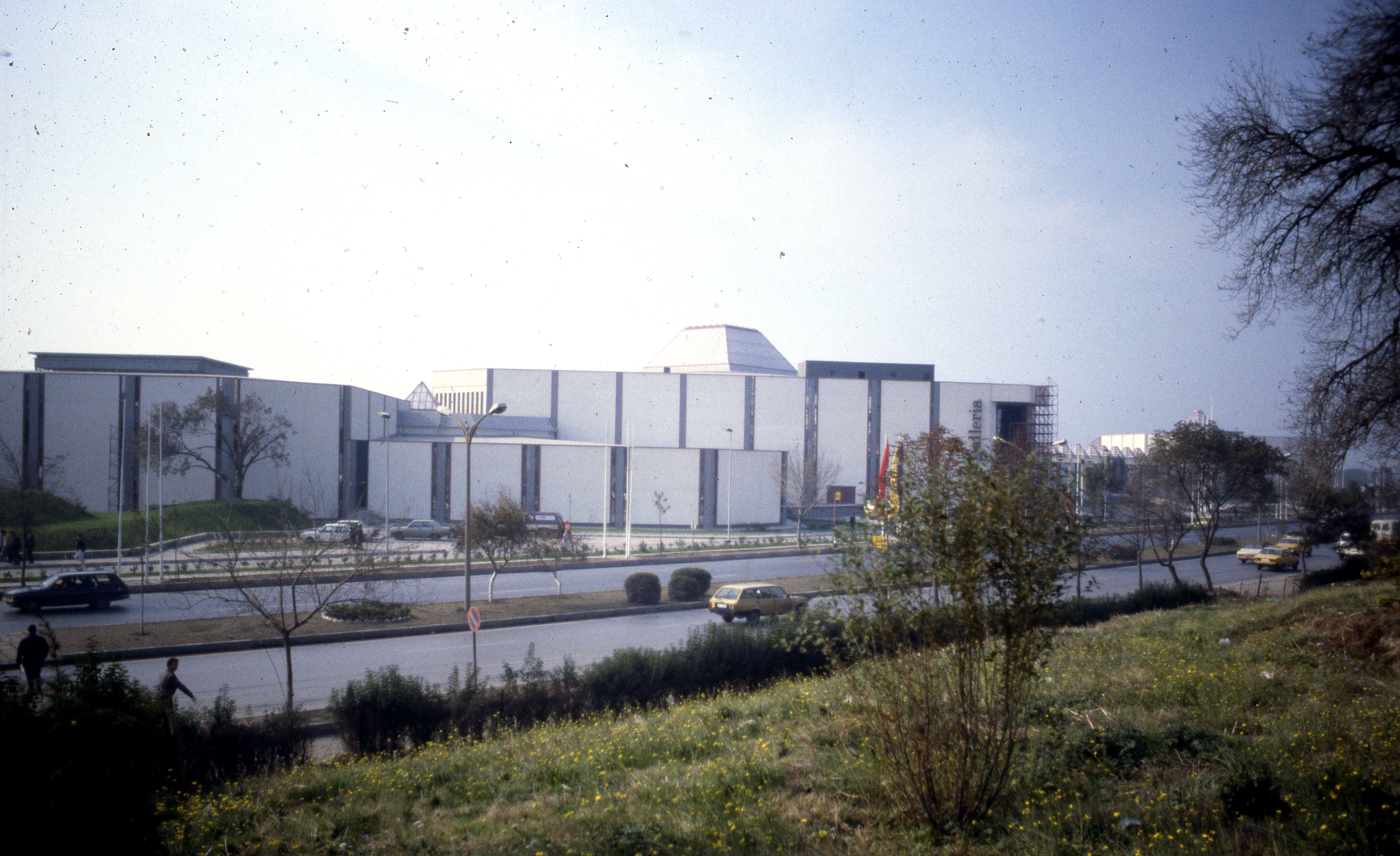

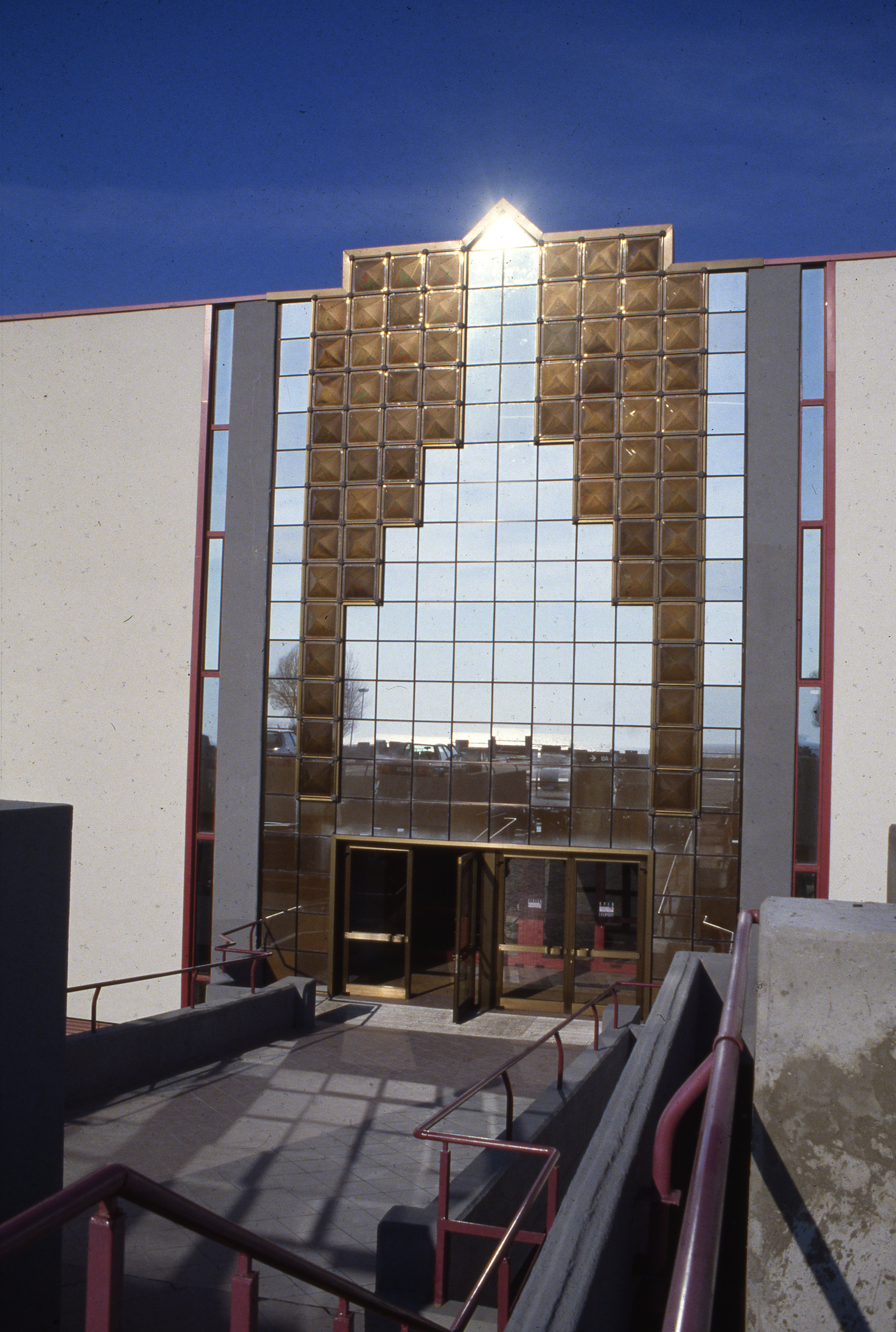

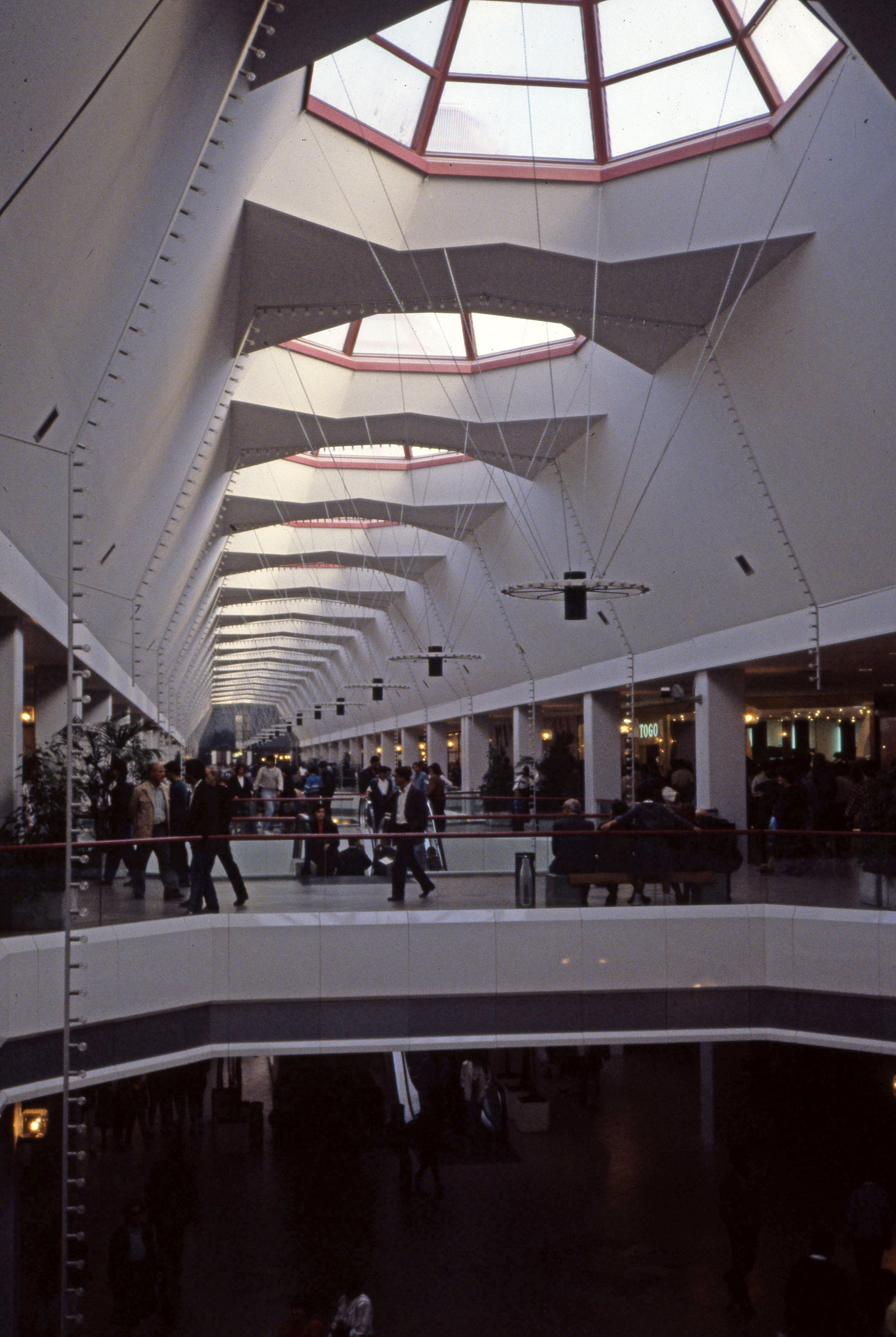

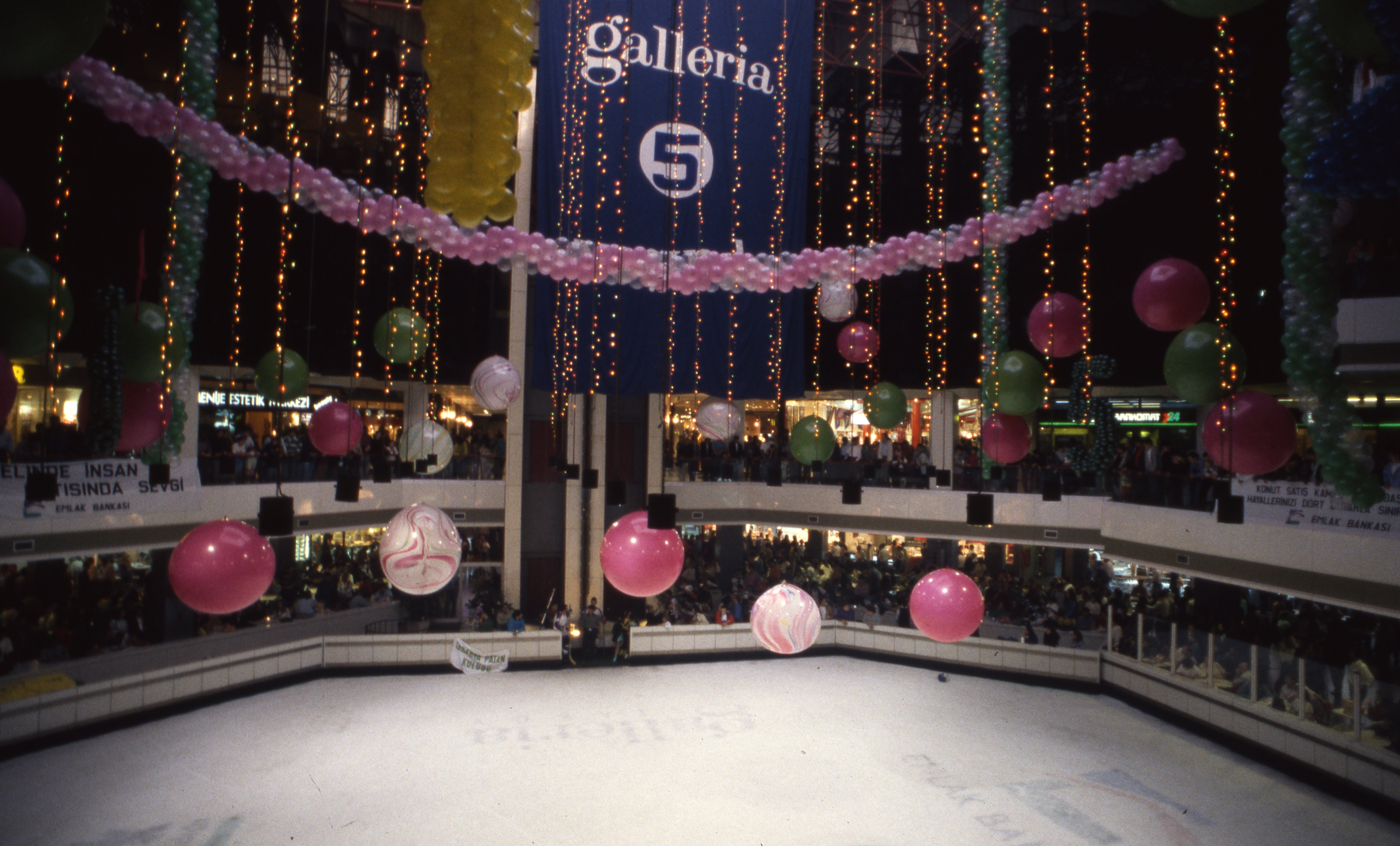

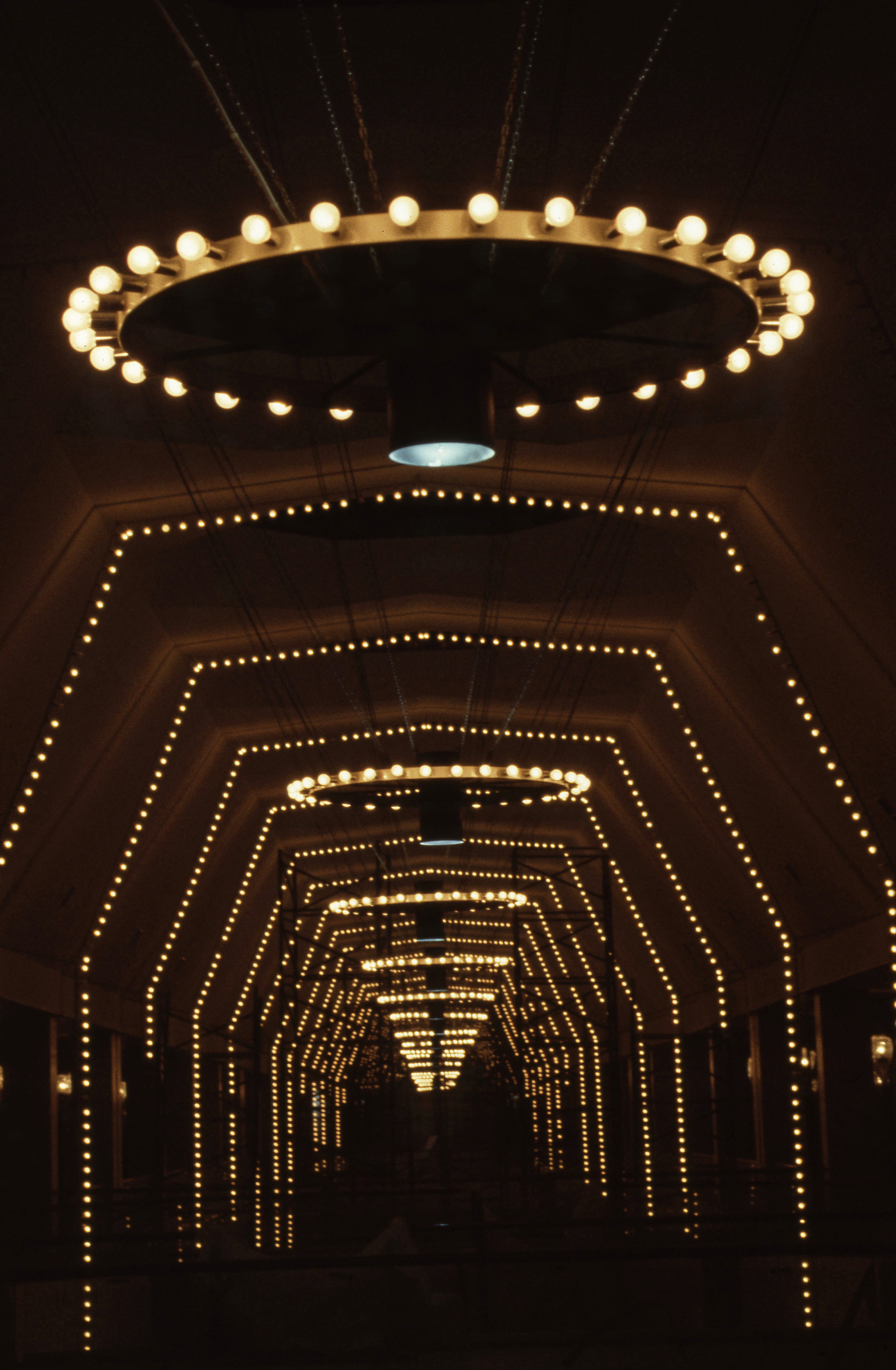

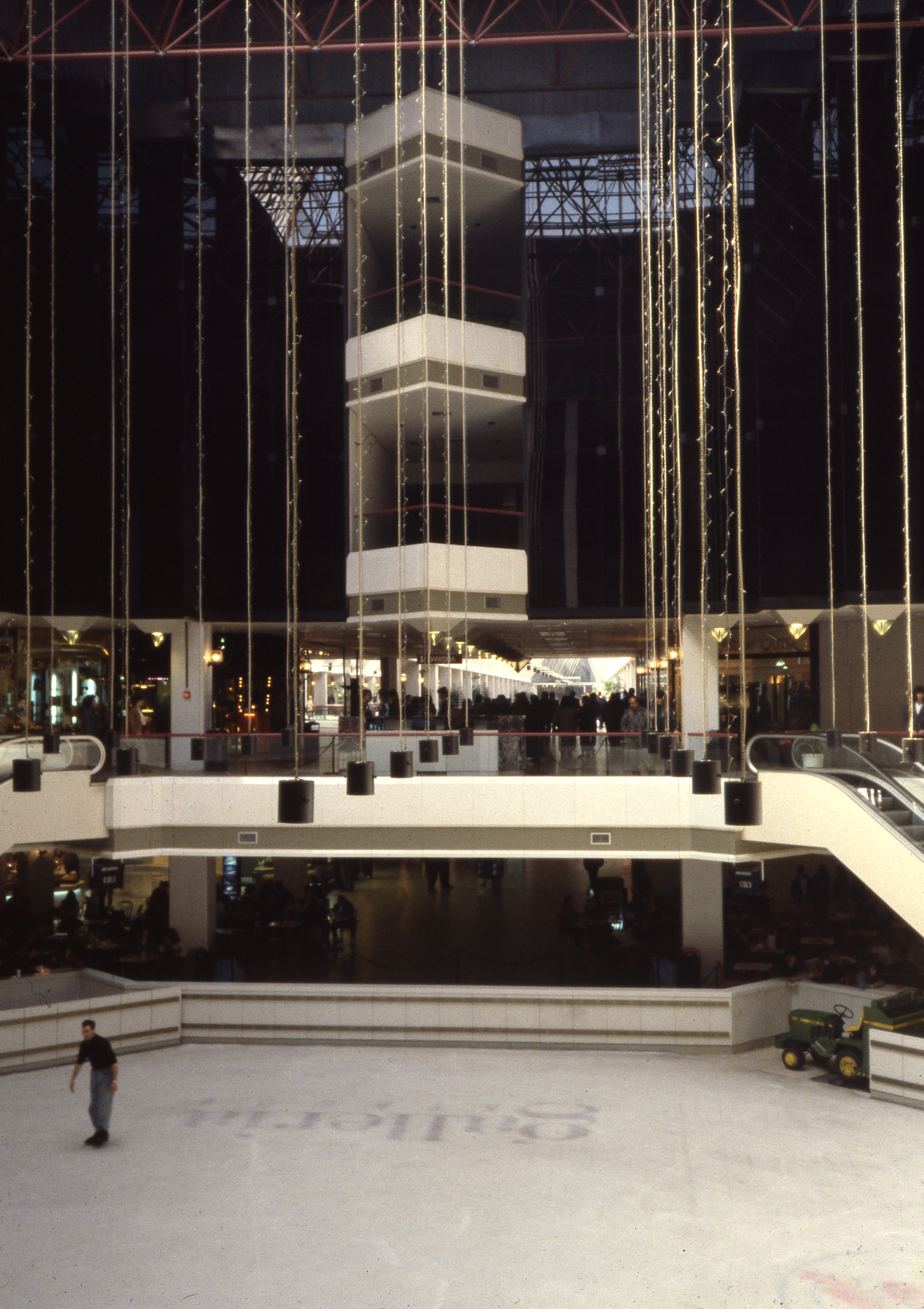

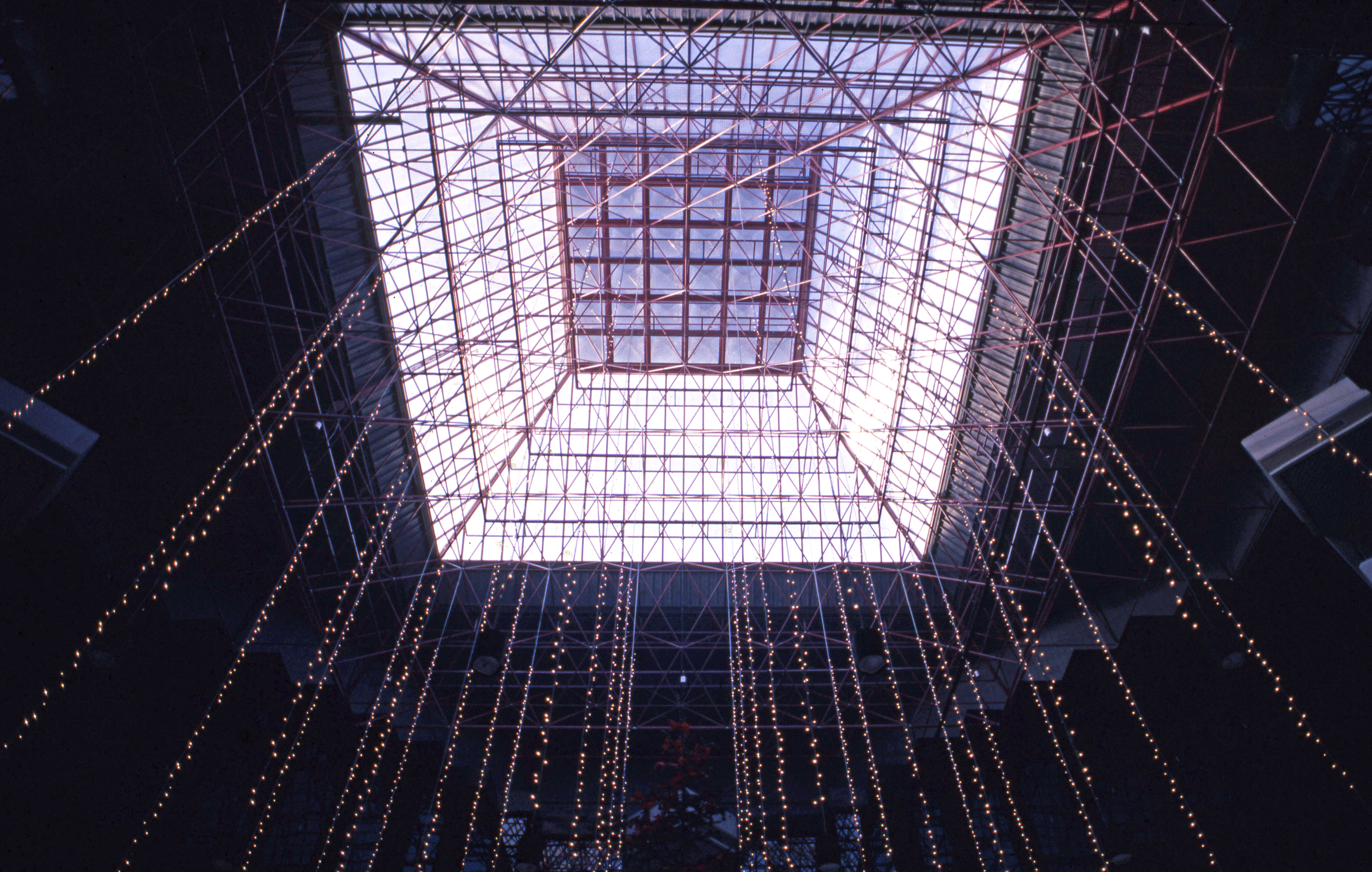

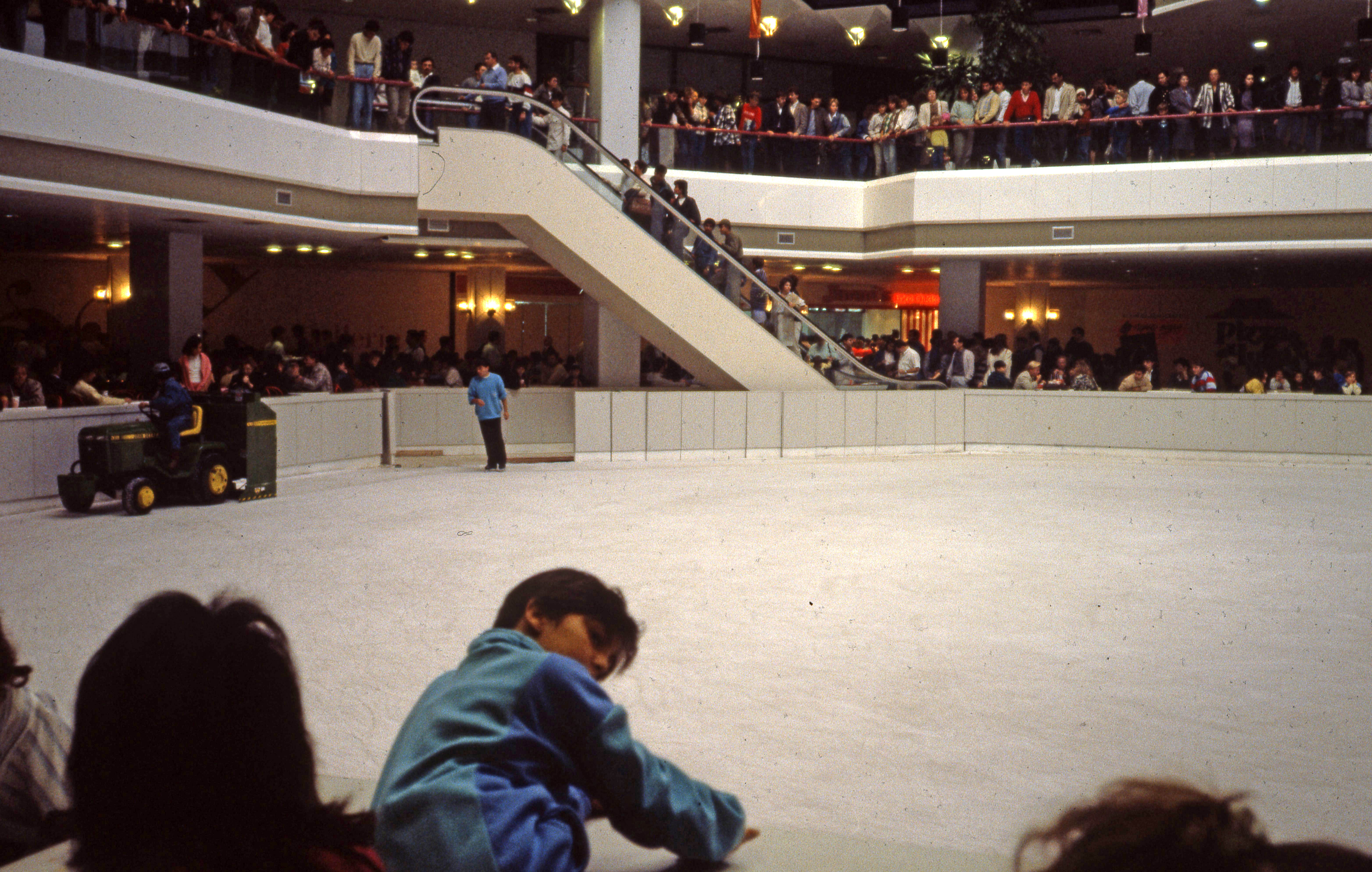

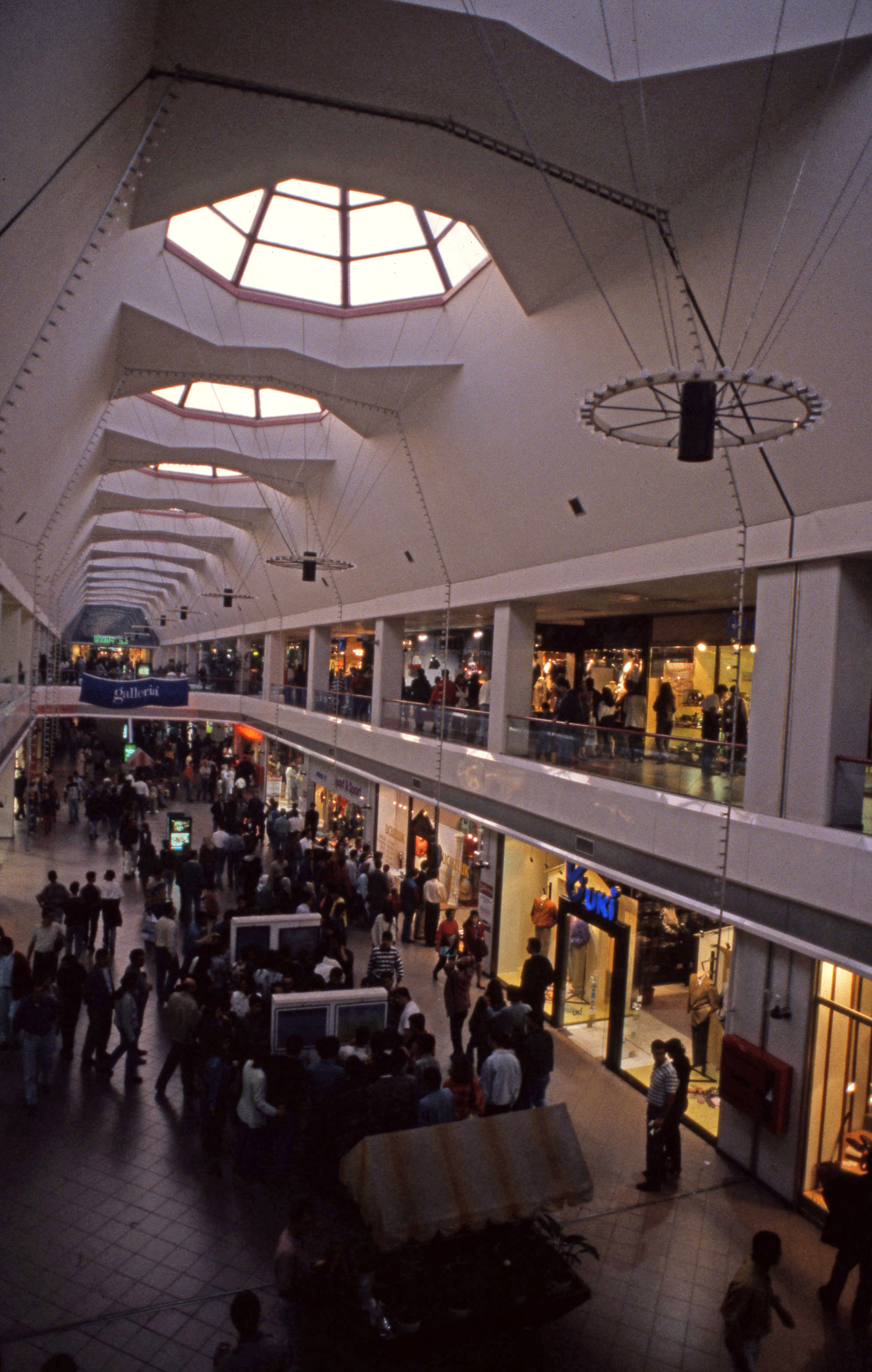

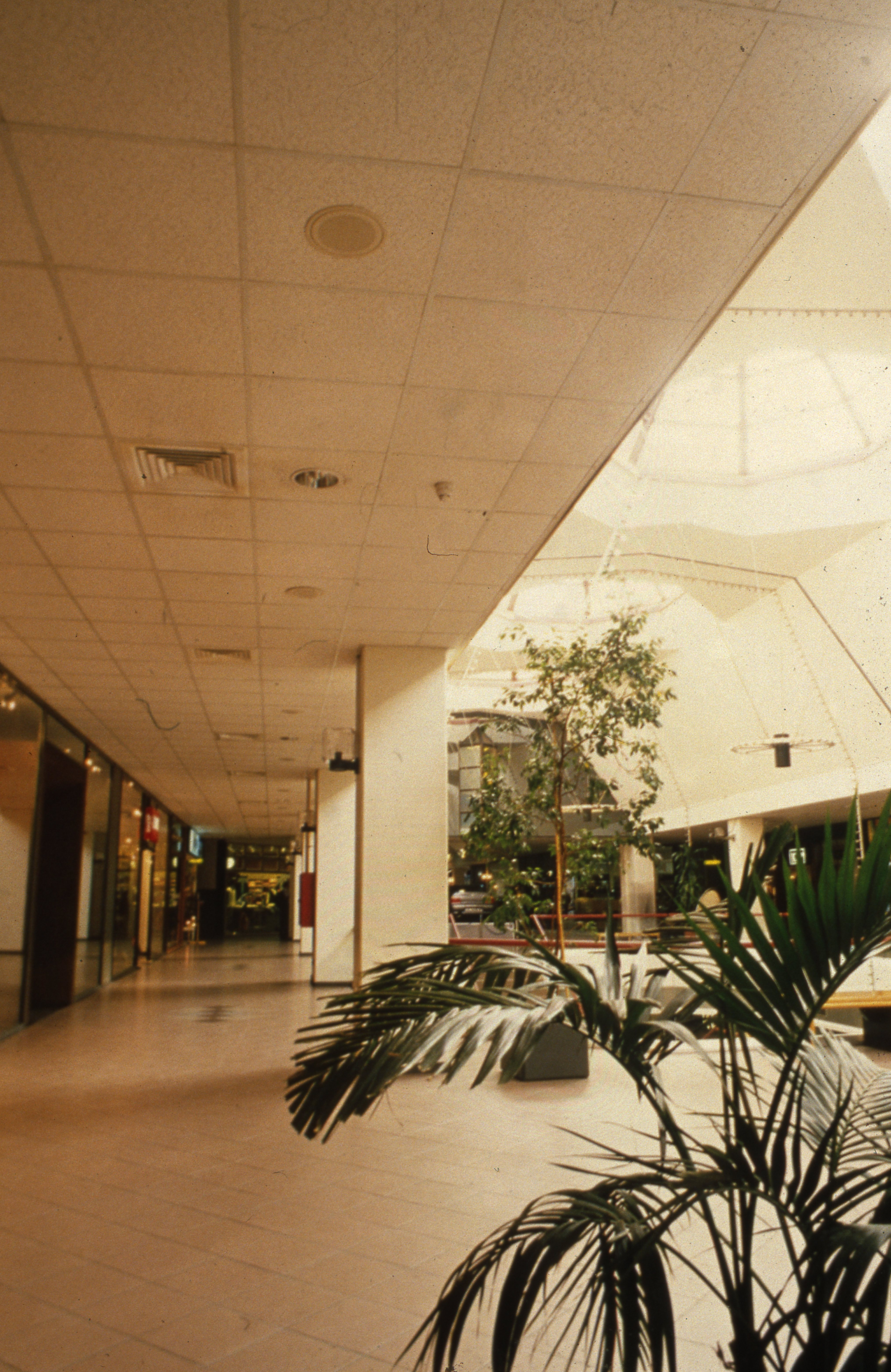

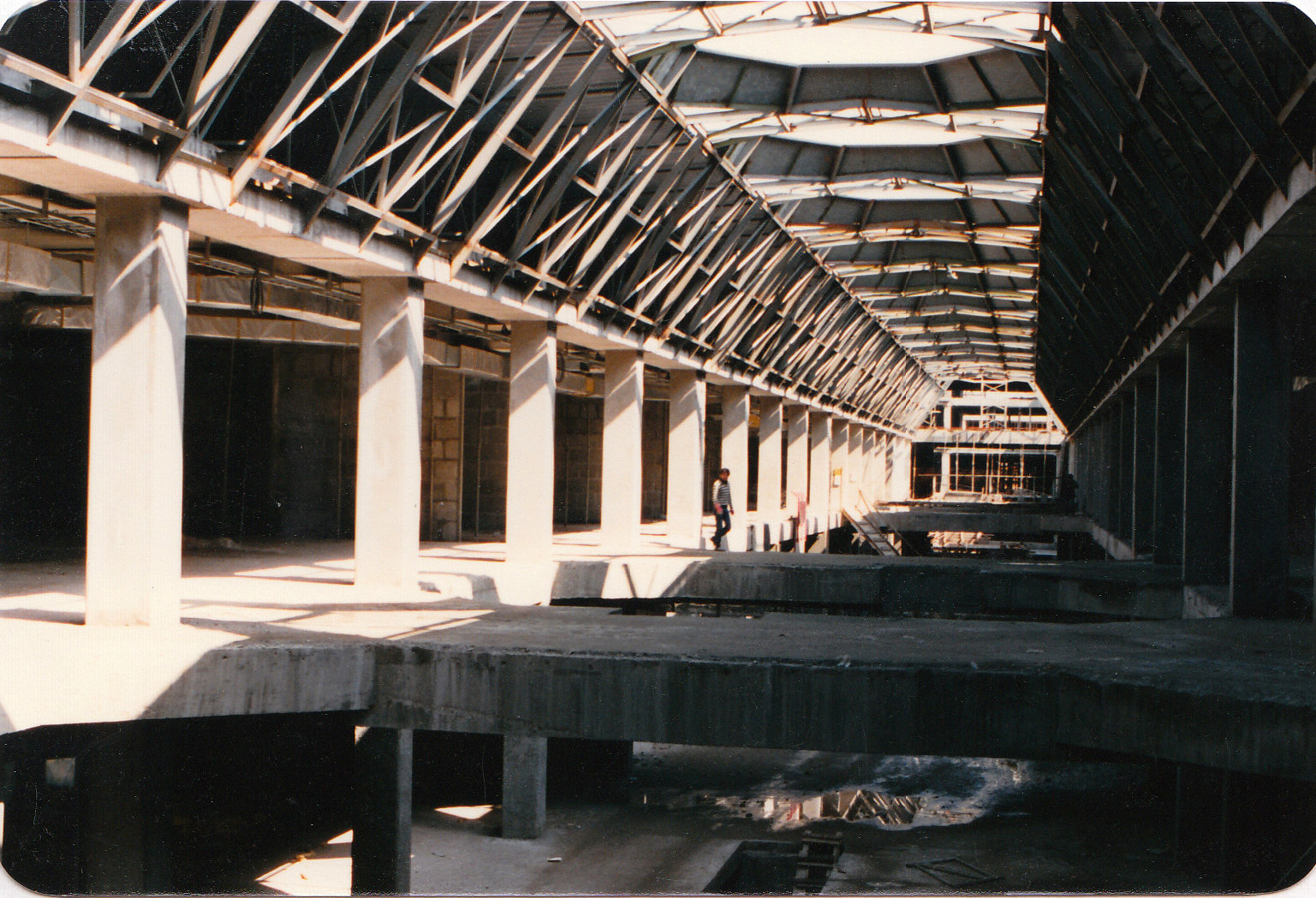

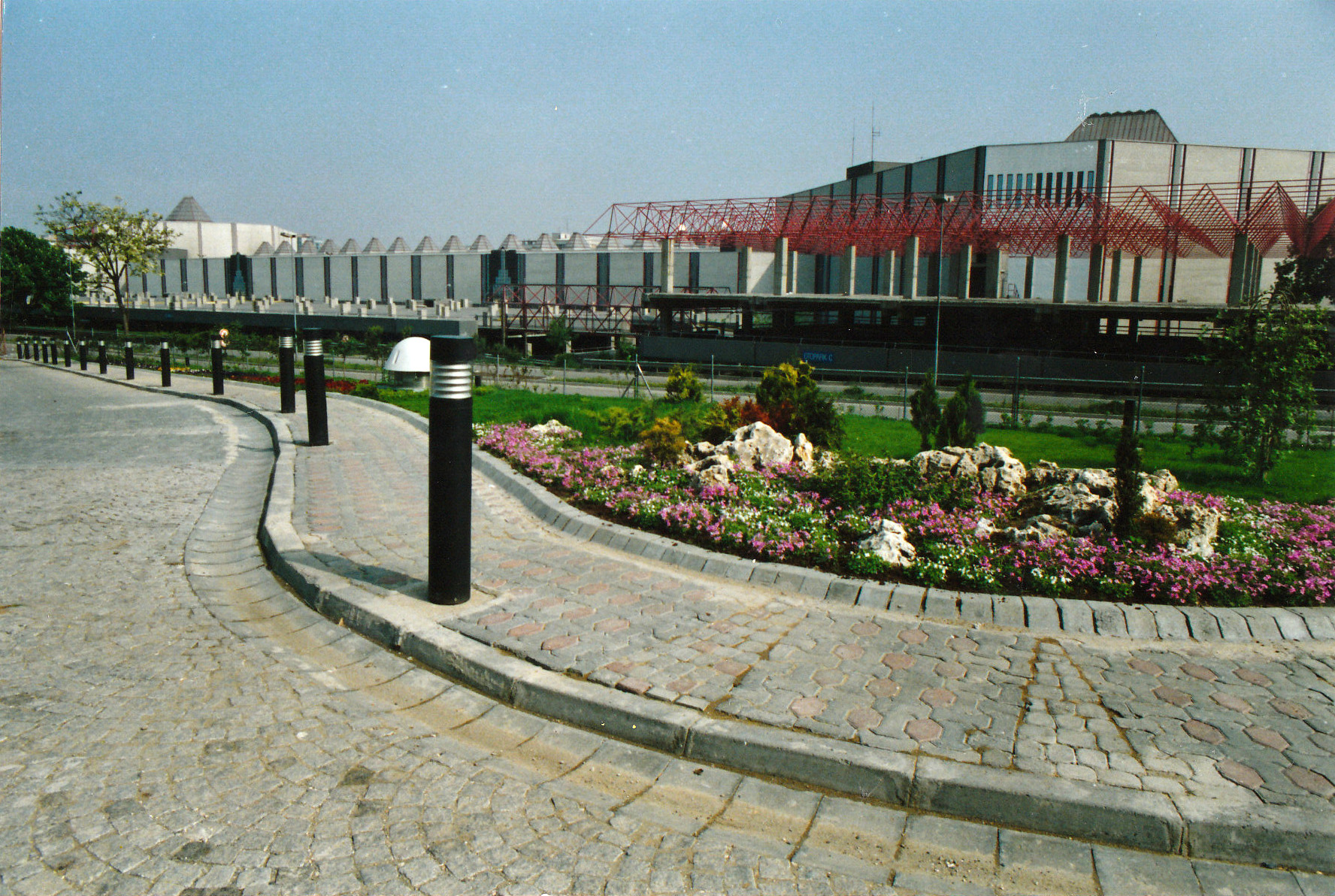

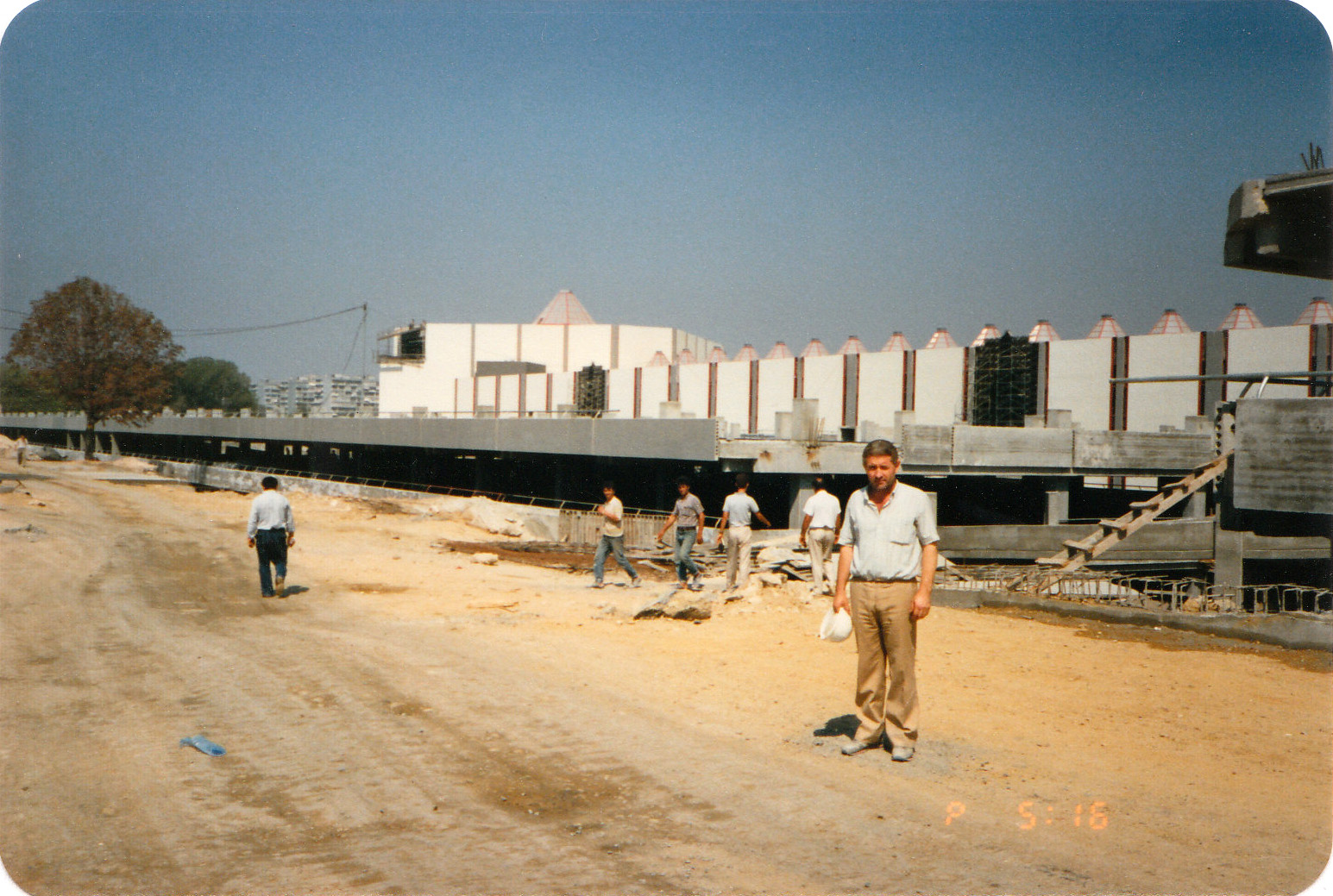

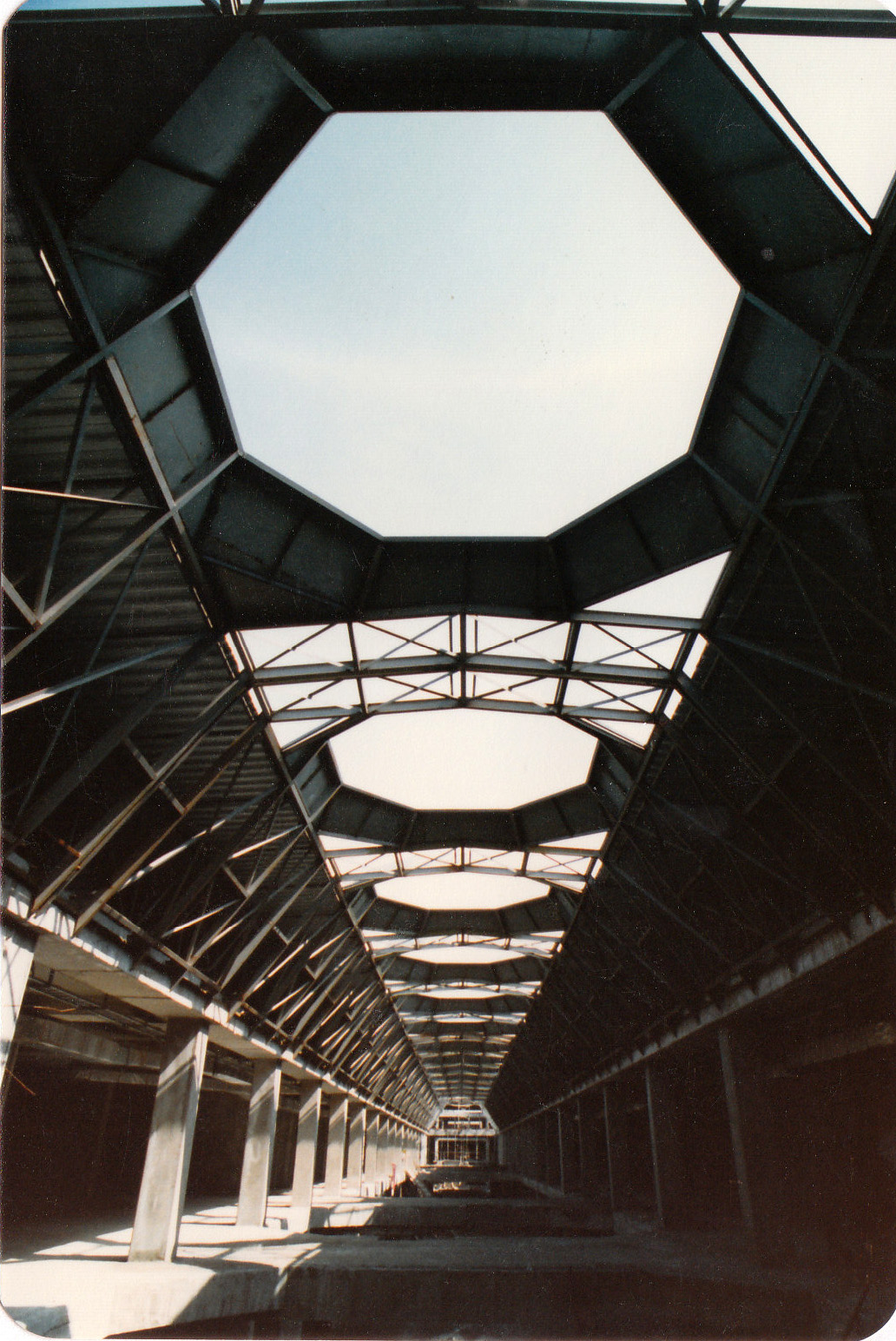

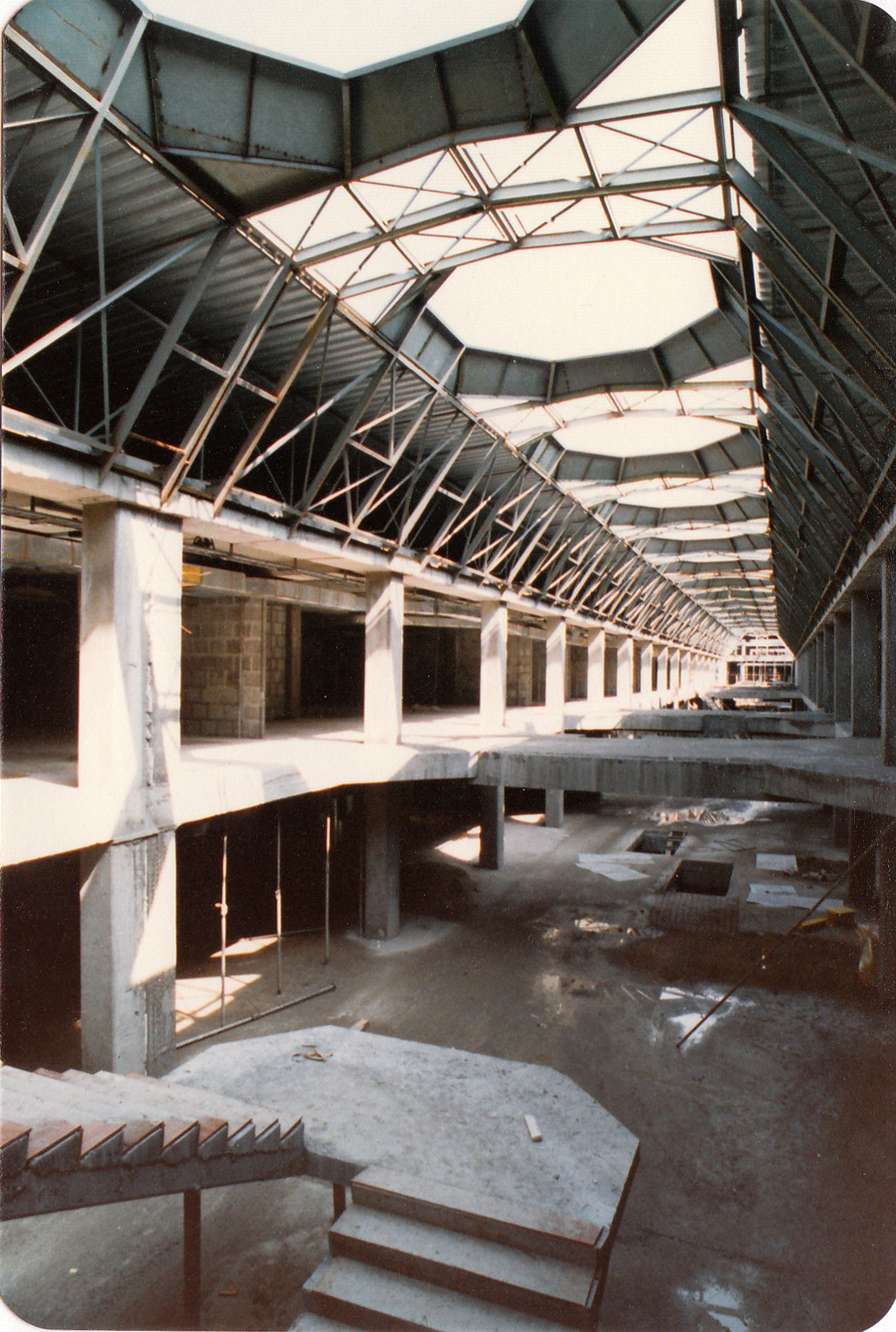

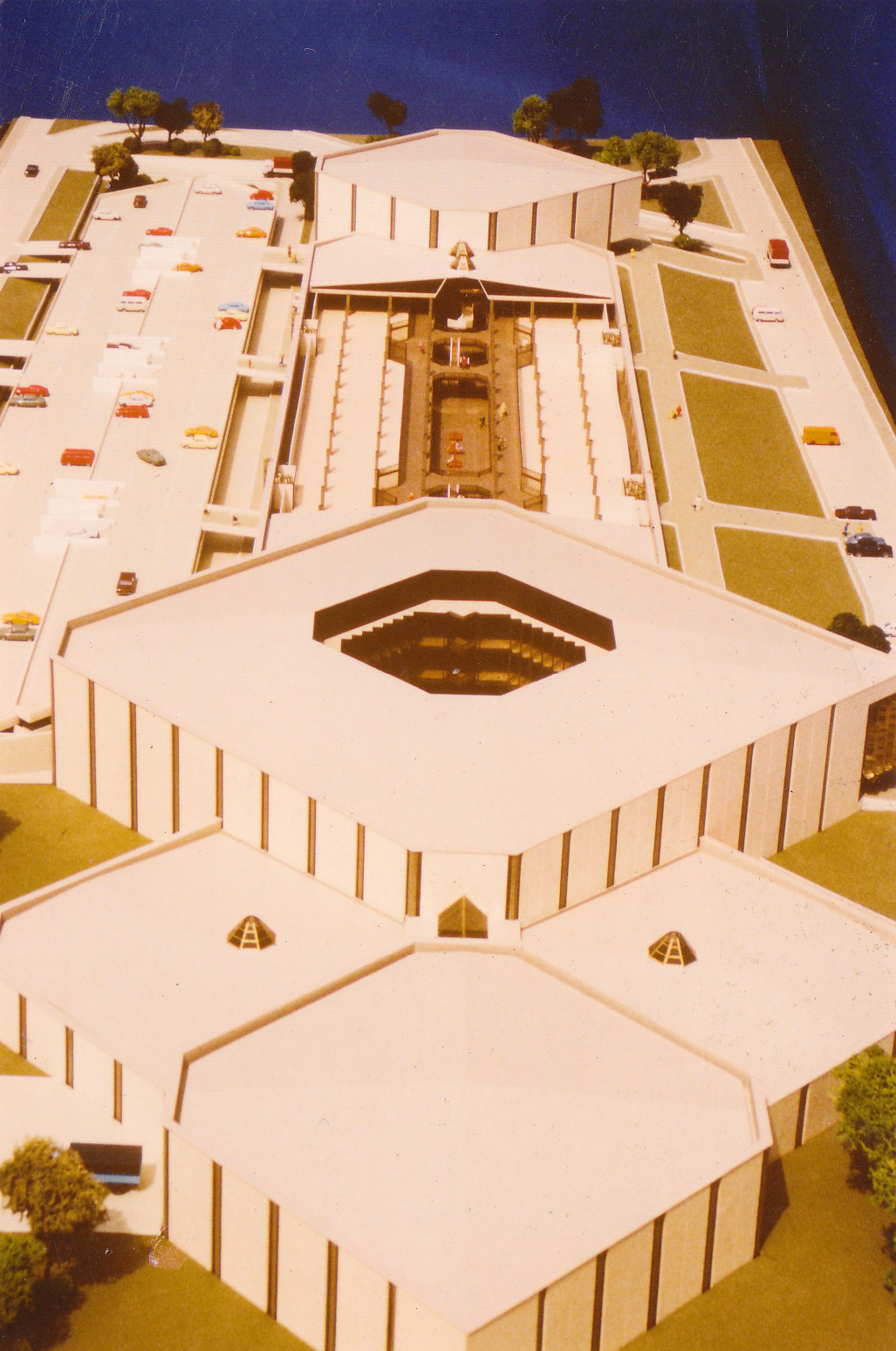

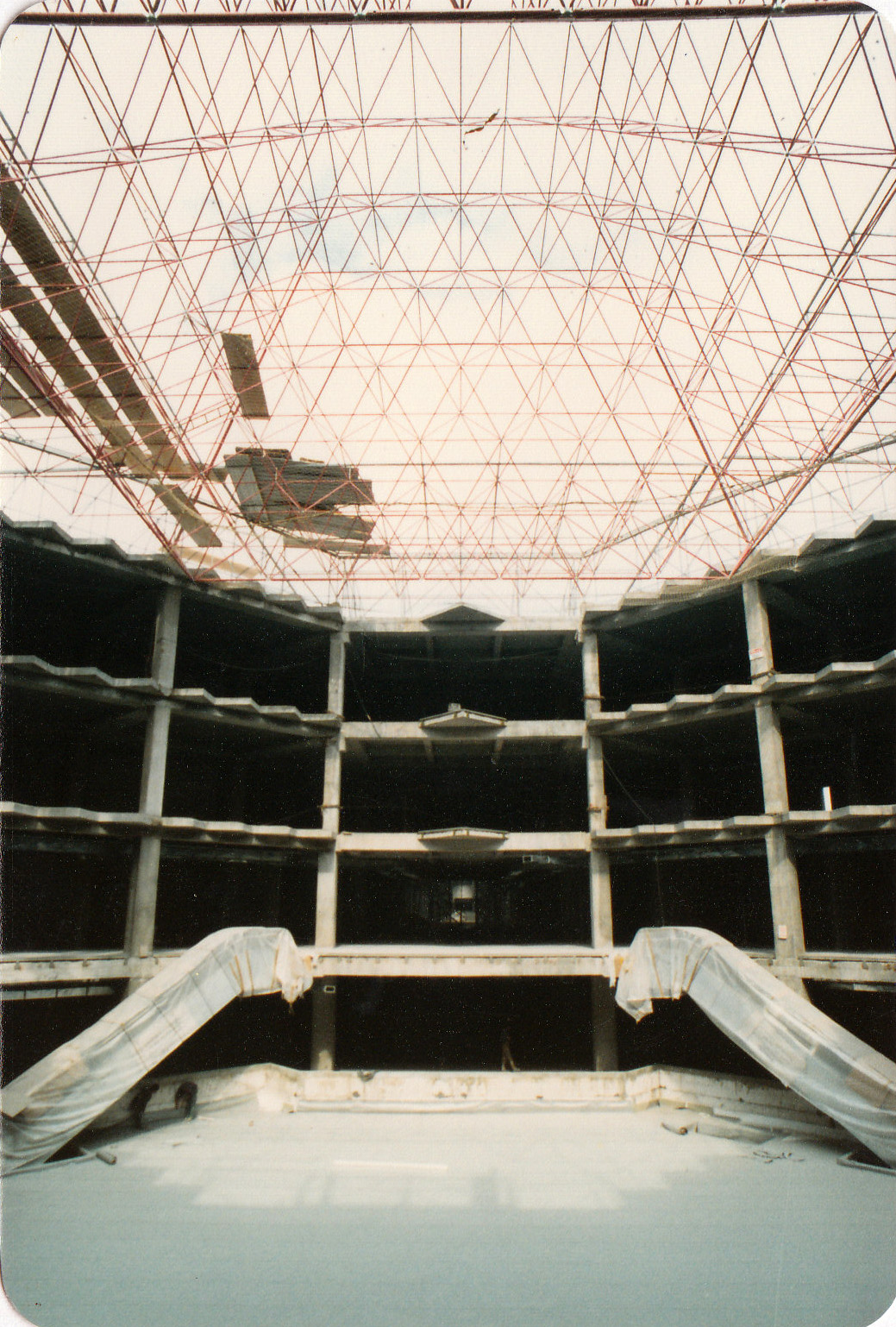

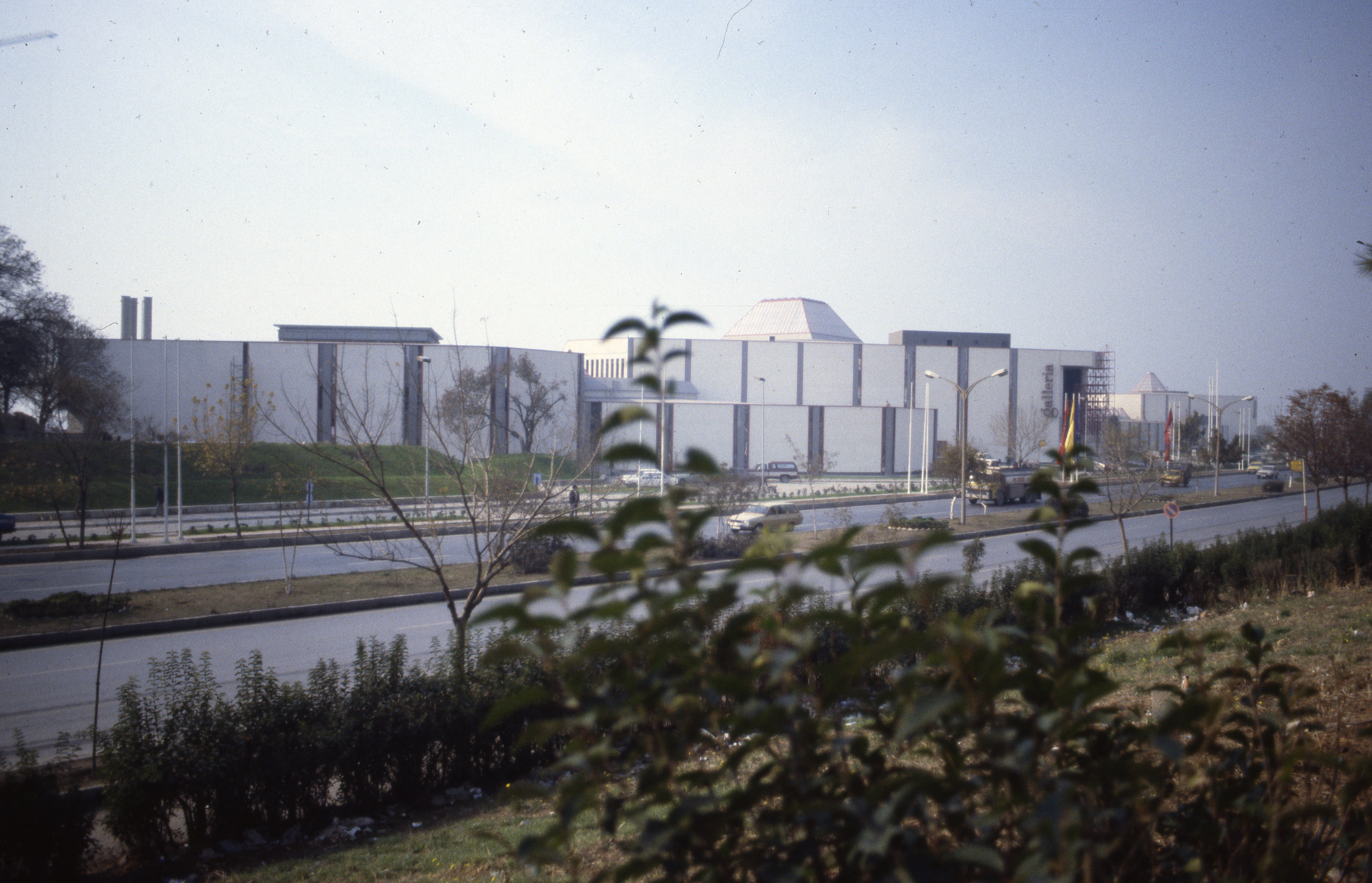

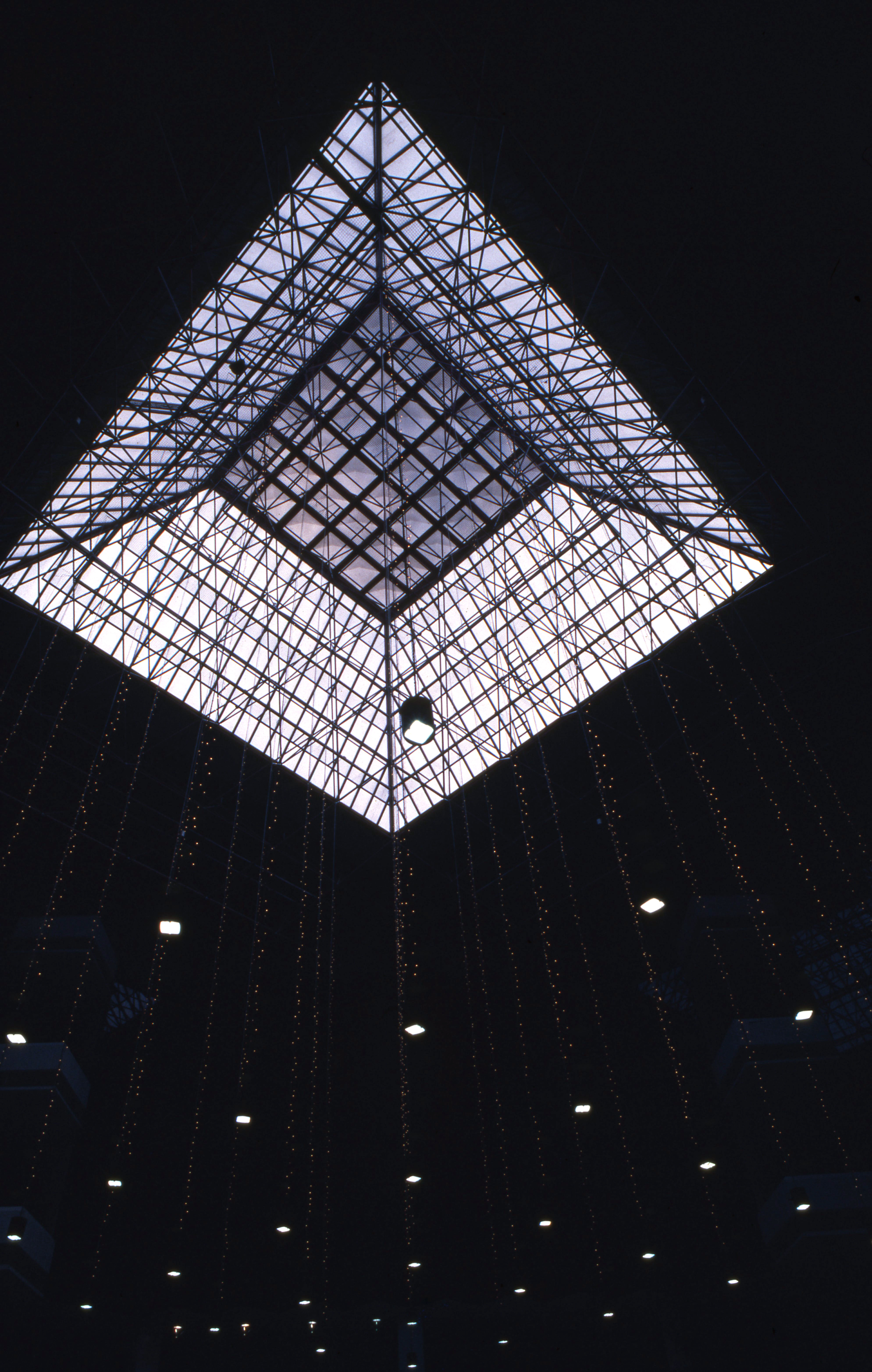

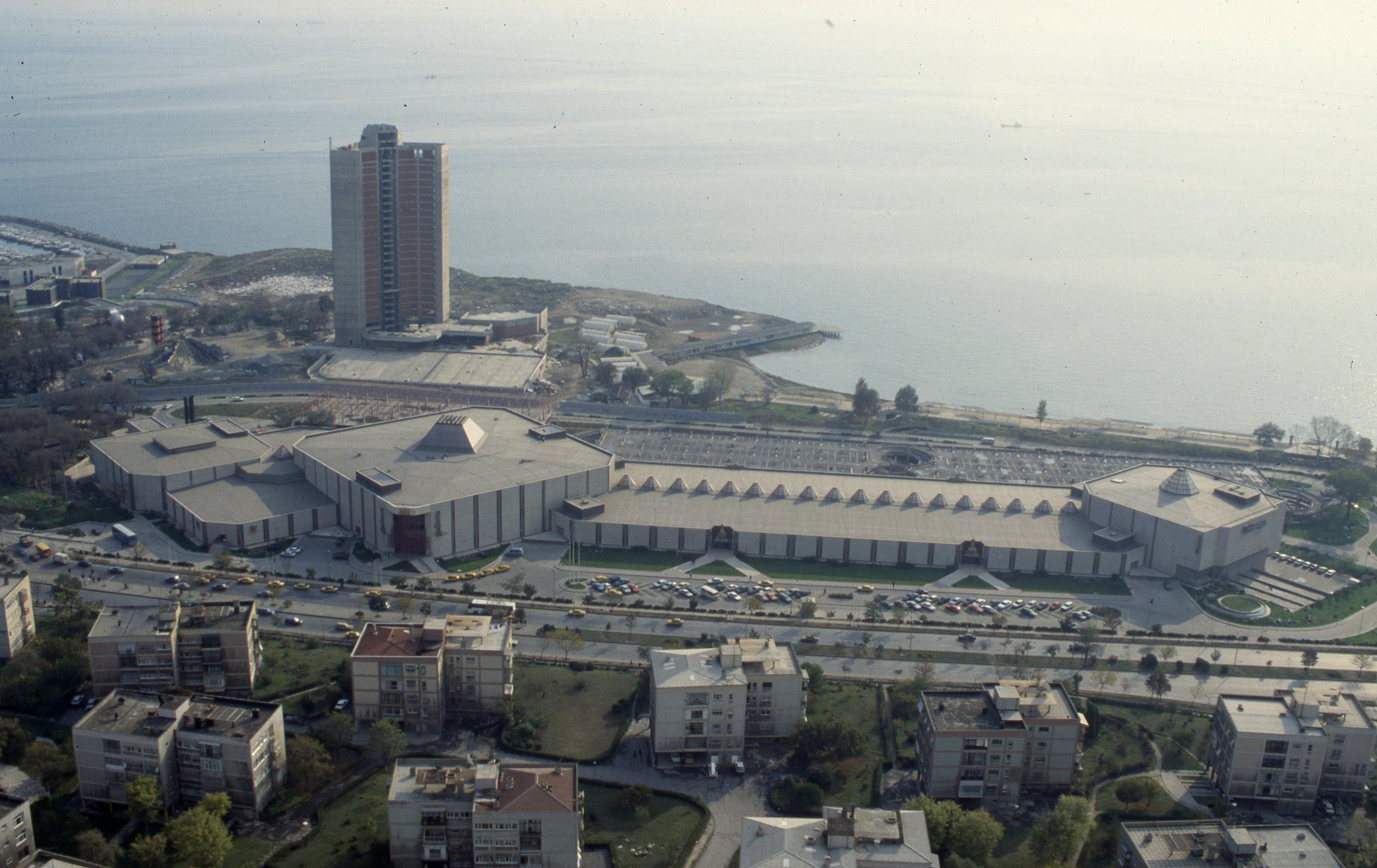

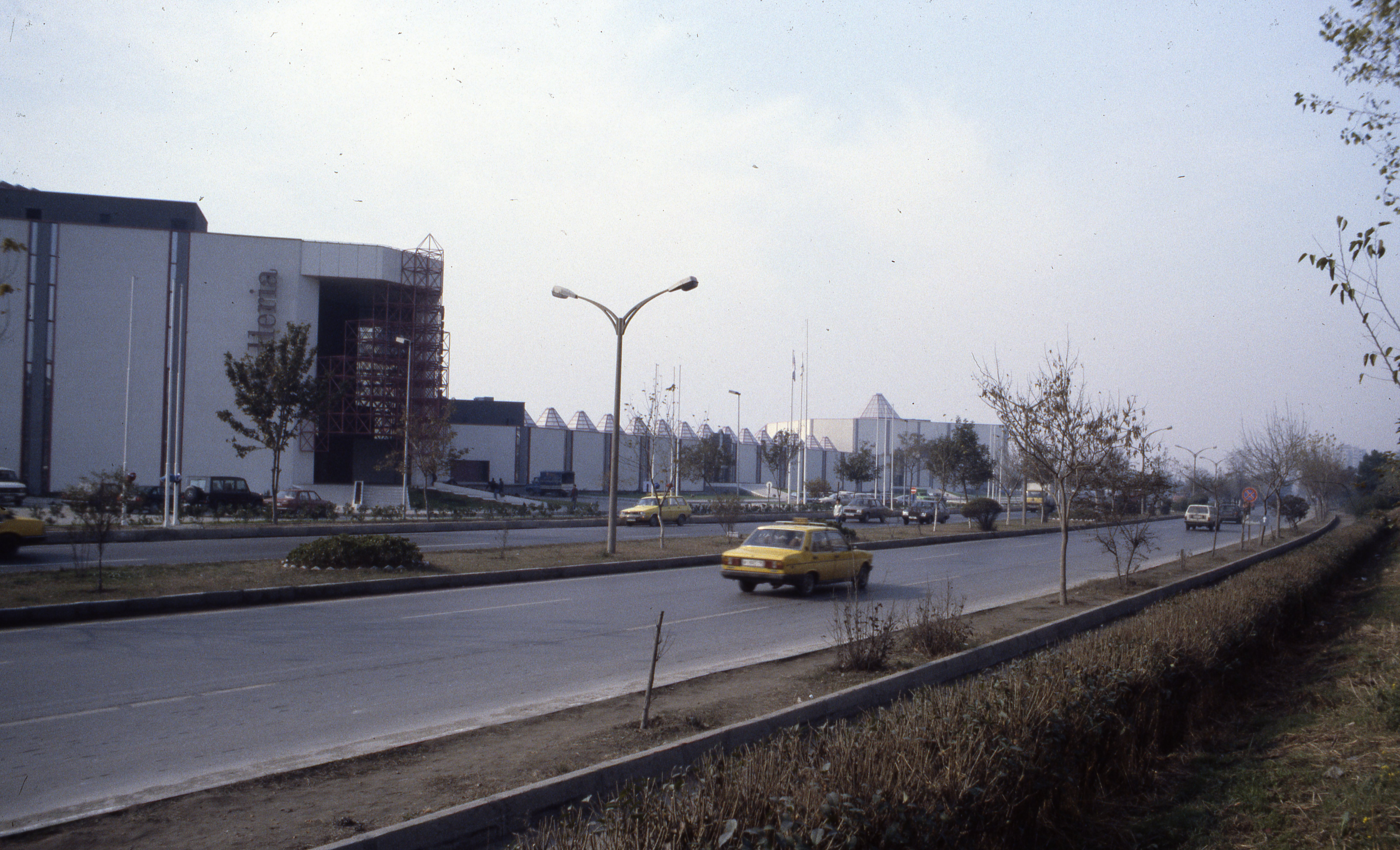

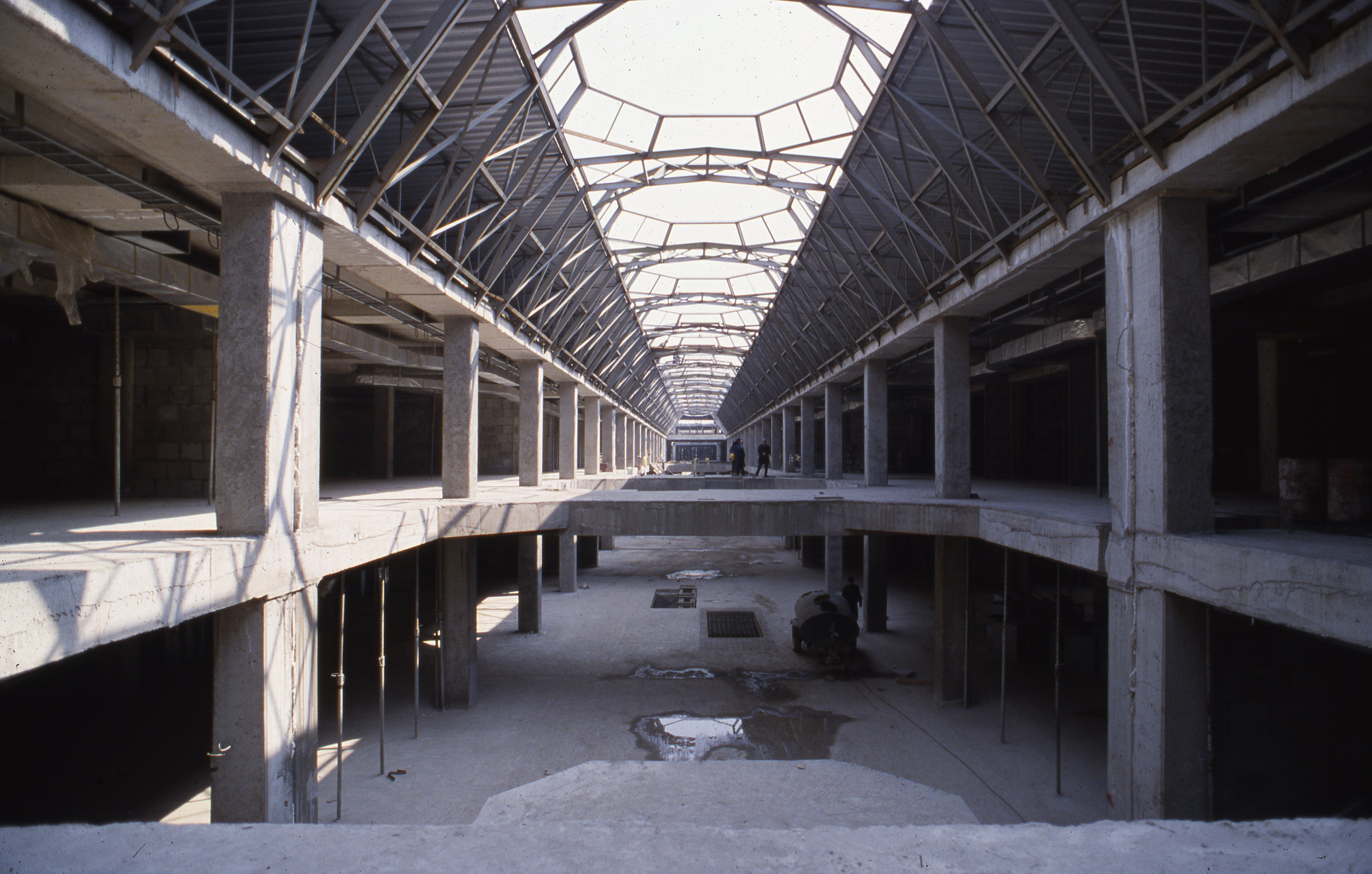

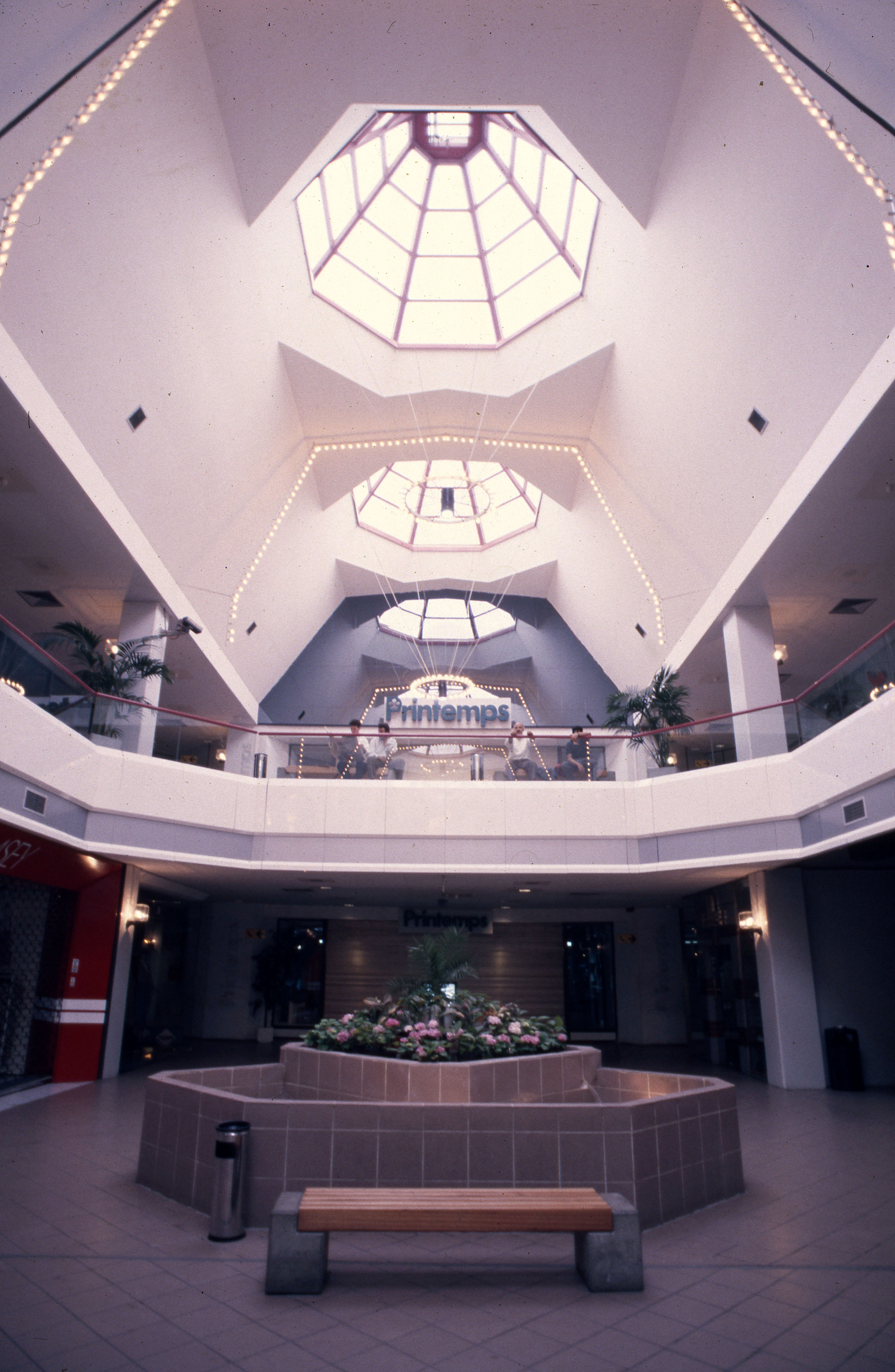

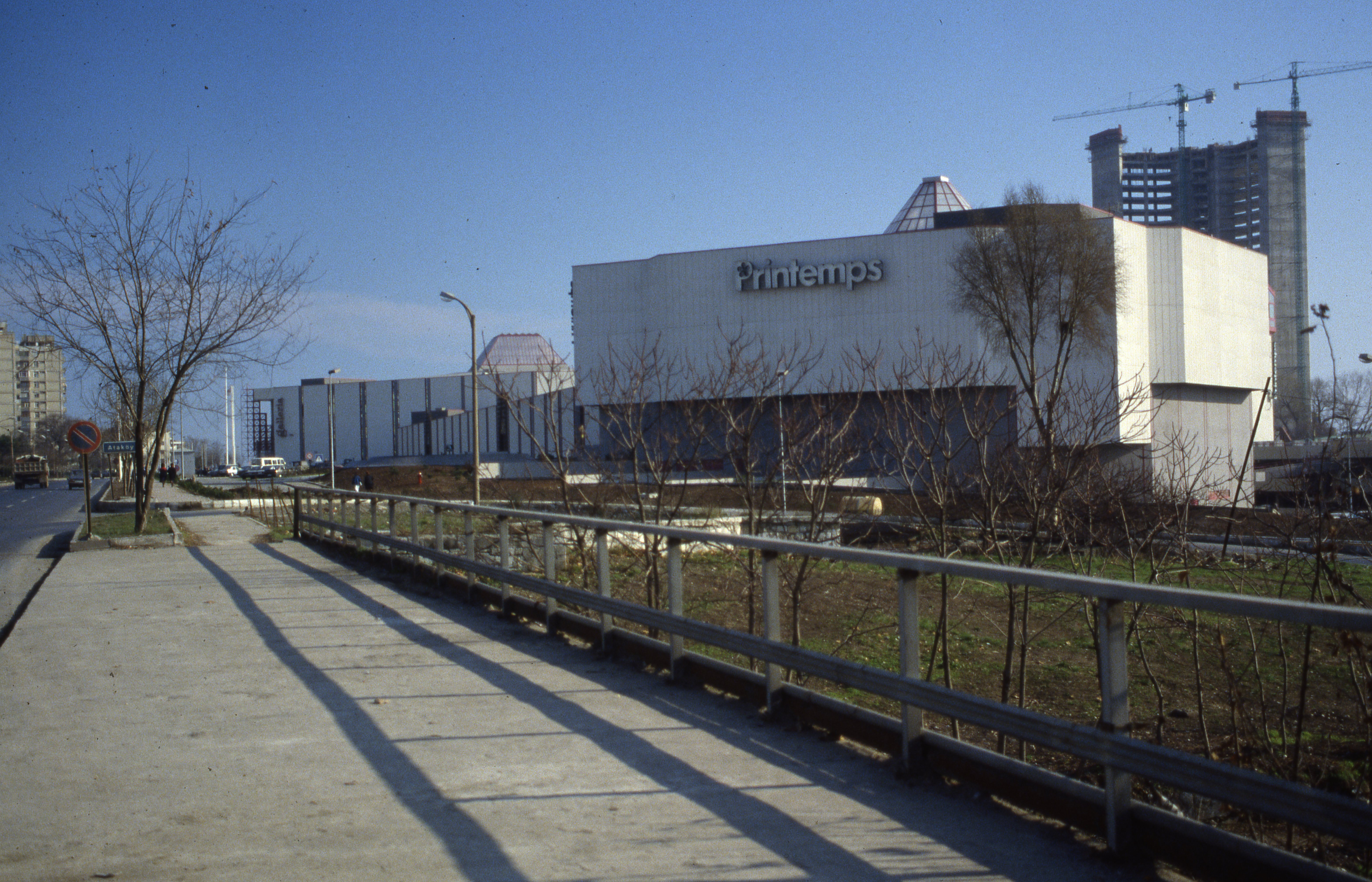

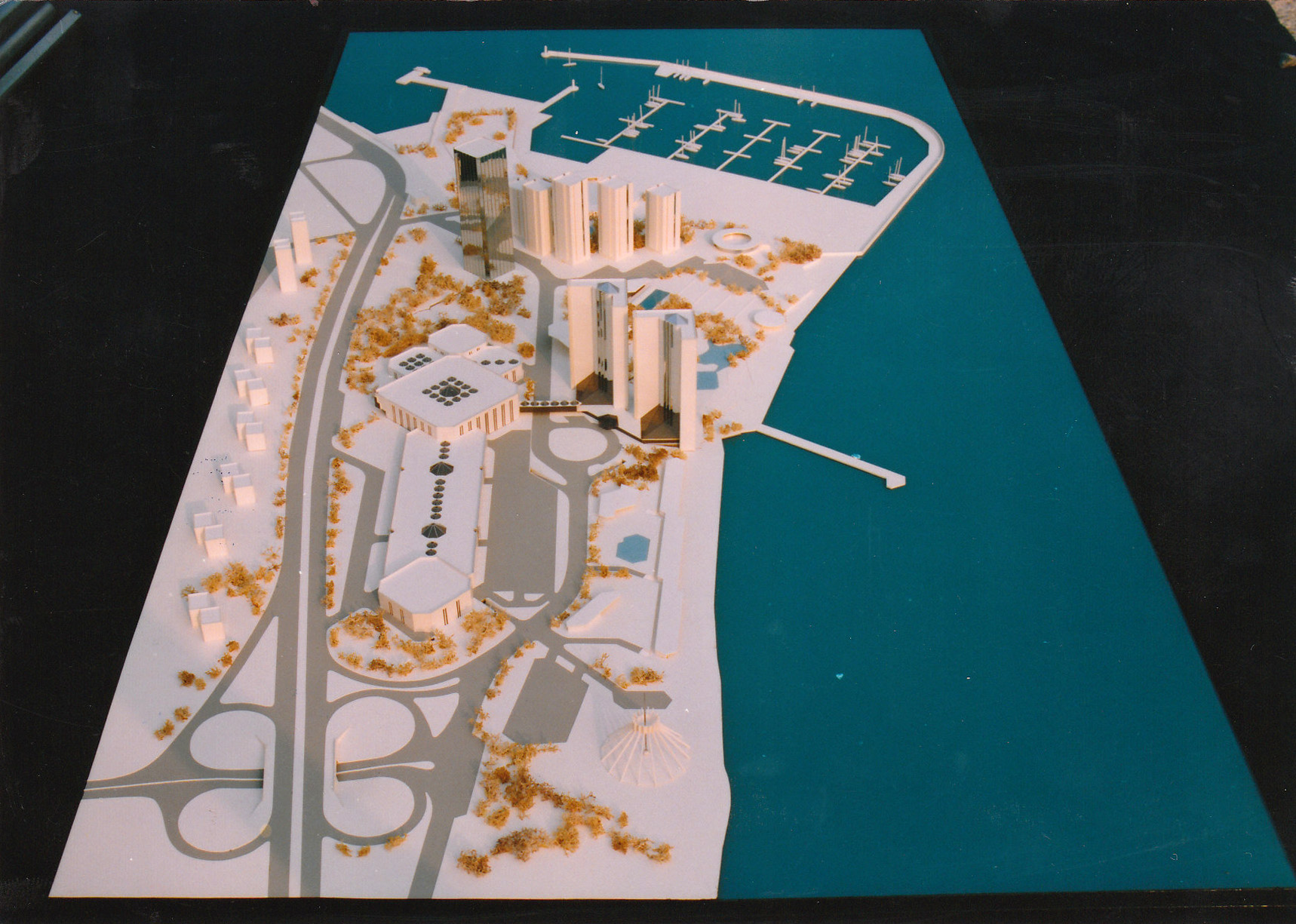

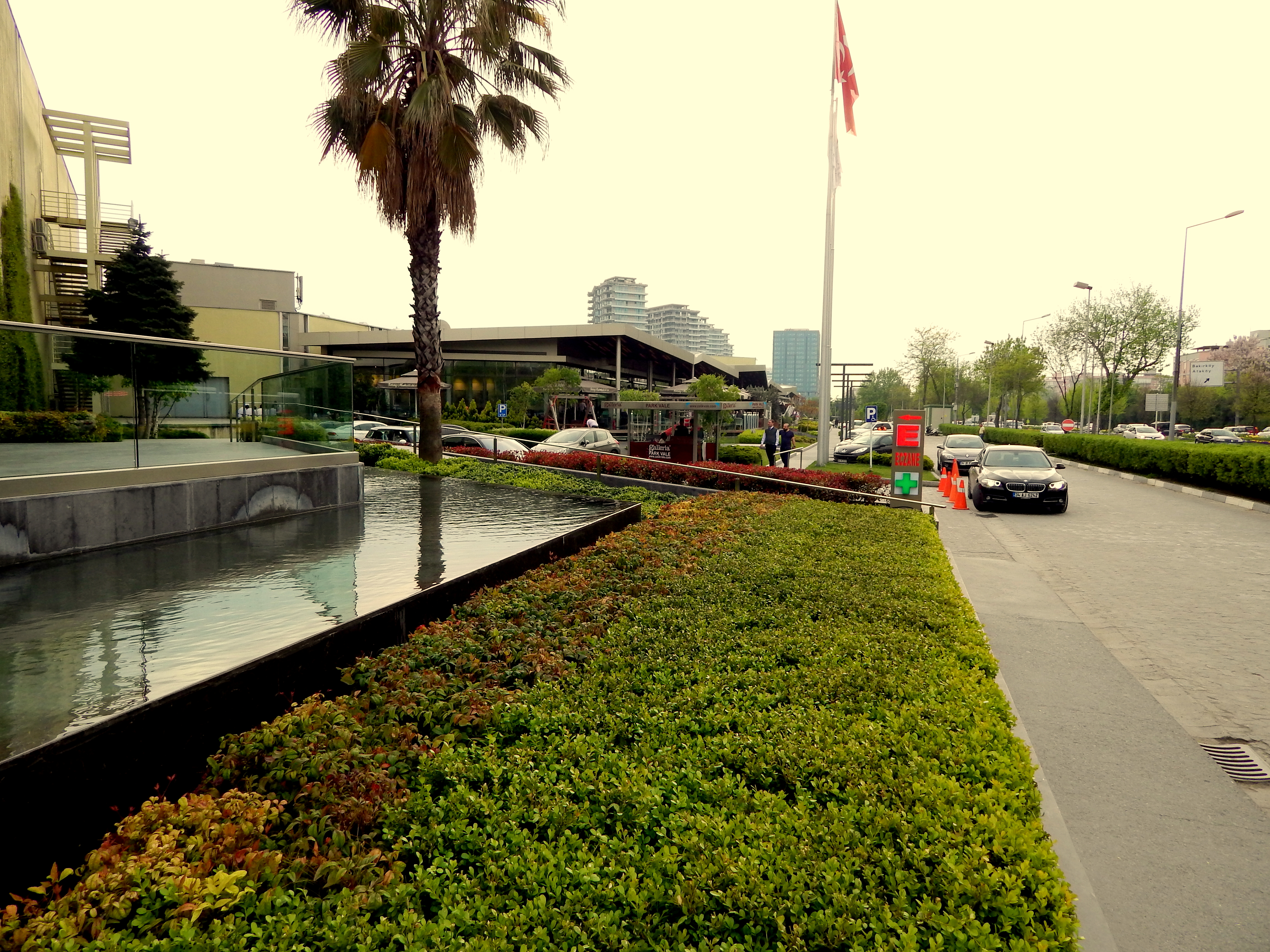

== See also ==
- List of shopping malls in Istanbul
- Galleria Ice Rink

== Bibliography ==
- From the Grand Bazaar to the modern shopping centers in Turkey. Turkish Council of Shopping Centers & Retailers (AMPD)
