= Printemps =

French department store chain

Coordinates: 48.874076°N 2.328469°E

Printemps SAS
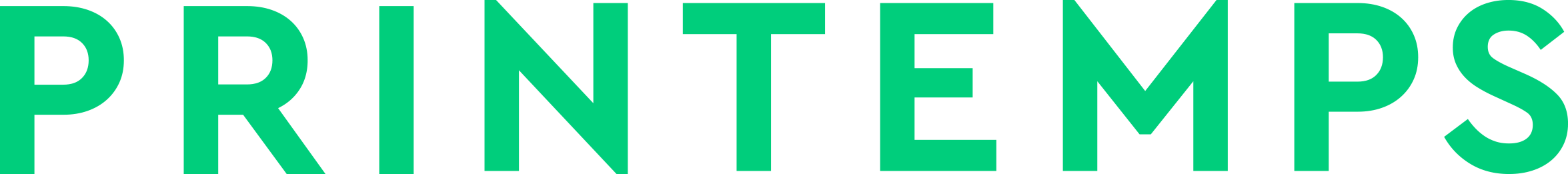

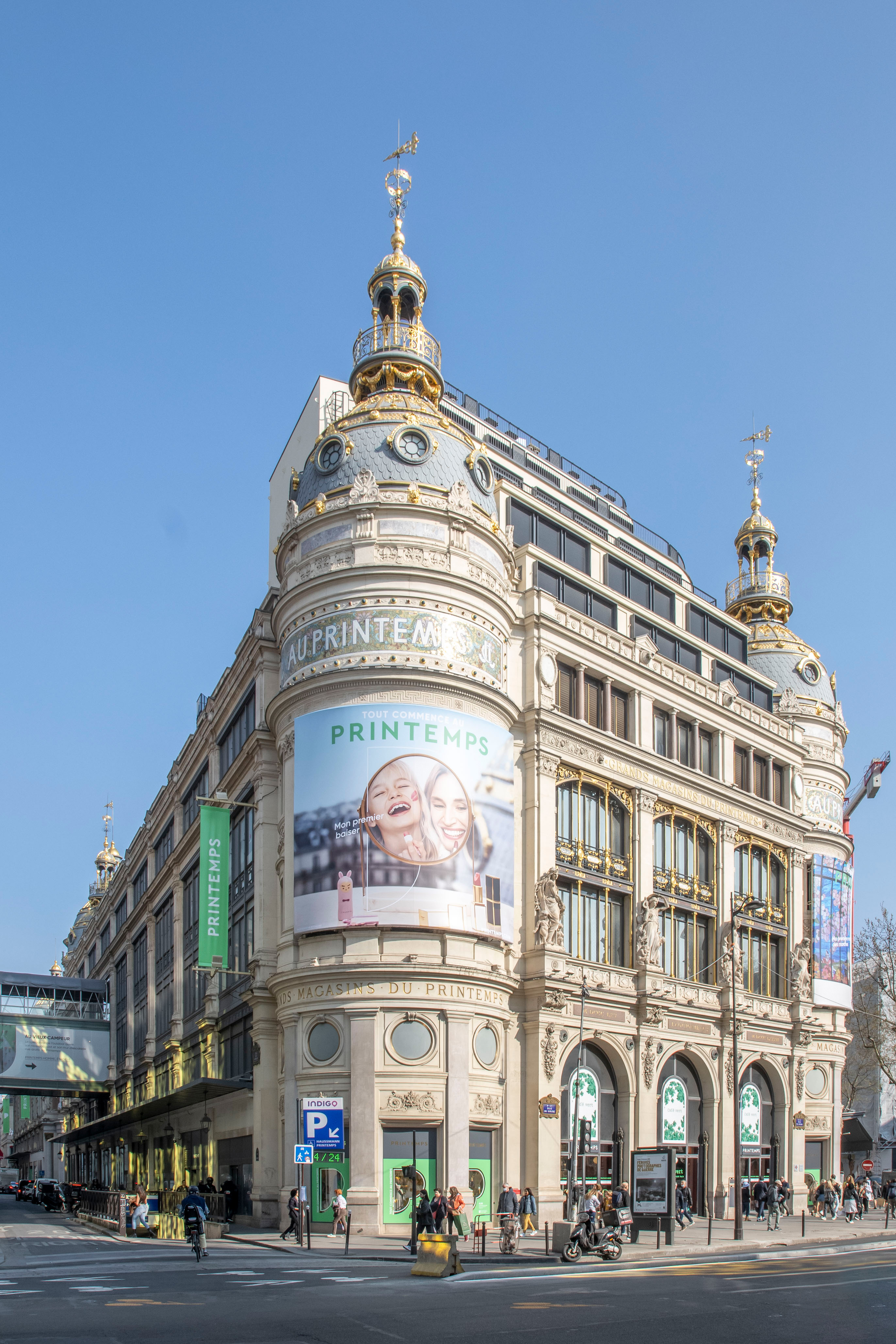
- Exterior of the Printemps Haussmann flagship store on Boulevard Haussmann in Paris (2022)
- Industry: Retail
- Genre: Department stores
- Founded: May 11, 1865; 161 years ago in Paris, France
- Founders: Jules Jaluzot; Augustine Jaluzot; Jean-Alfred Duclos
- Headquarters: Paris, France
- Number of locations: 20 (Note: Store count includes 18 full-line and two outlet locations.)
- Areas served: France; Qatar; United States
- Key people: Rémy Baume (CEO); Laëtitia Henry (General Manager, Printemps Haussmann)
- Number of employees: 3,300 (2025)
- Parent: Maus Frères (1972–1991); PPR (1991–2006); Deutsche Bank (2006–2013); Groupe Printemps (2013–present)
- Website: printemps.com

Printemps (Note: English: springtime; French: [pʁɛ̃tɑ̃] /præ̃ˈtɒ̃/) is a French luxury department store chain founded in 1865, which focuses on beauty, lifestyle, fashion and accessories. The flagship store "le Printemps Haussmann" (Note: French: [lə pʁɛ̃tɑ̃ osman]) is located on Boulevard Haussmann in the 9th arrondissement of Paris. The holding company Groupe Printemps has been owned by the Luxembourg-based, Qatari-backed investment fund Divine Investments SA since 2013.

As of 2026, Printemps operates eighteen stores in France (including two in Paris, and two outlet stores), as well as two international locations in Doha, Qatar and New York City, United States. The company was a founder of the International Association of Department Stores as well as one of its members from 1928 until 1997.

== History ==
=== Early history (19th-century) ===
The first Printemps store (now commonly known as "Printemps Haussmann"), was opened on 3 November 1865. Founded by Jules Jaluzot and Jean-Alfred Duclos, Jaluzot was previously head of the silk department at Au Bon Marché. Jaluzots wife Augustine Jaluzot (née Figeac), an actress and member of the Comédie Française financed the stores opening. The store had a large expansion in 1874 which included the addition of hydraulic elevators.

The policies of Printemps revolutionised retail business practices. The store marked items with set prices and eschewed the haggling based on customer appearance that had previously been standard in retail shopping. Like other grands magasins (lit. 'big stores', department stores), Printemps used the economies of scale to provide high quality goods at prices that the expanding middle class could afford. They also pioneered the idea of discount sales to clear outdated stock, and later the use of window models to display the latest fashions. Printemps was noted for its branding innovations as well, handing out bouquets of violets on the first day of spring and championing the new Art Nouveau style, with its nature inspired motifs.

In 1881 the store caught on fire causing the entire building to be destroyed, but after the fire the store was rebuilt with the new building designed by architects Jules and Paul Sédille. The figures of the Four Seasons on the façade were sculpted by French sculptor Henri Chapu. The store also became the first to use electric lighting with the rebuild and customers were even able to observe the power station behind a glass wall.

"Comptoirs d'exportation" (export counters) were opened in Yokohama (1887 - Japan), Avricourt (1872 - Alsace-Lorraine) and Tangiers (1891 - Morocco).

=== 20th-century ===
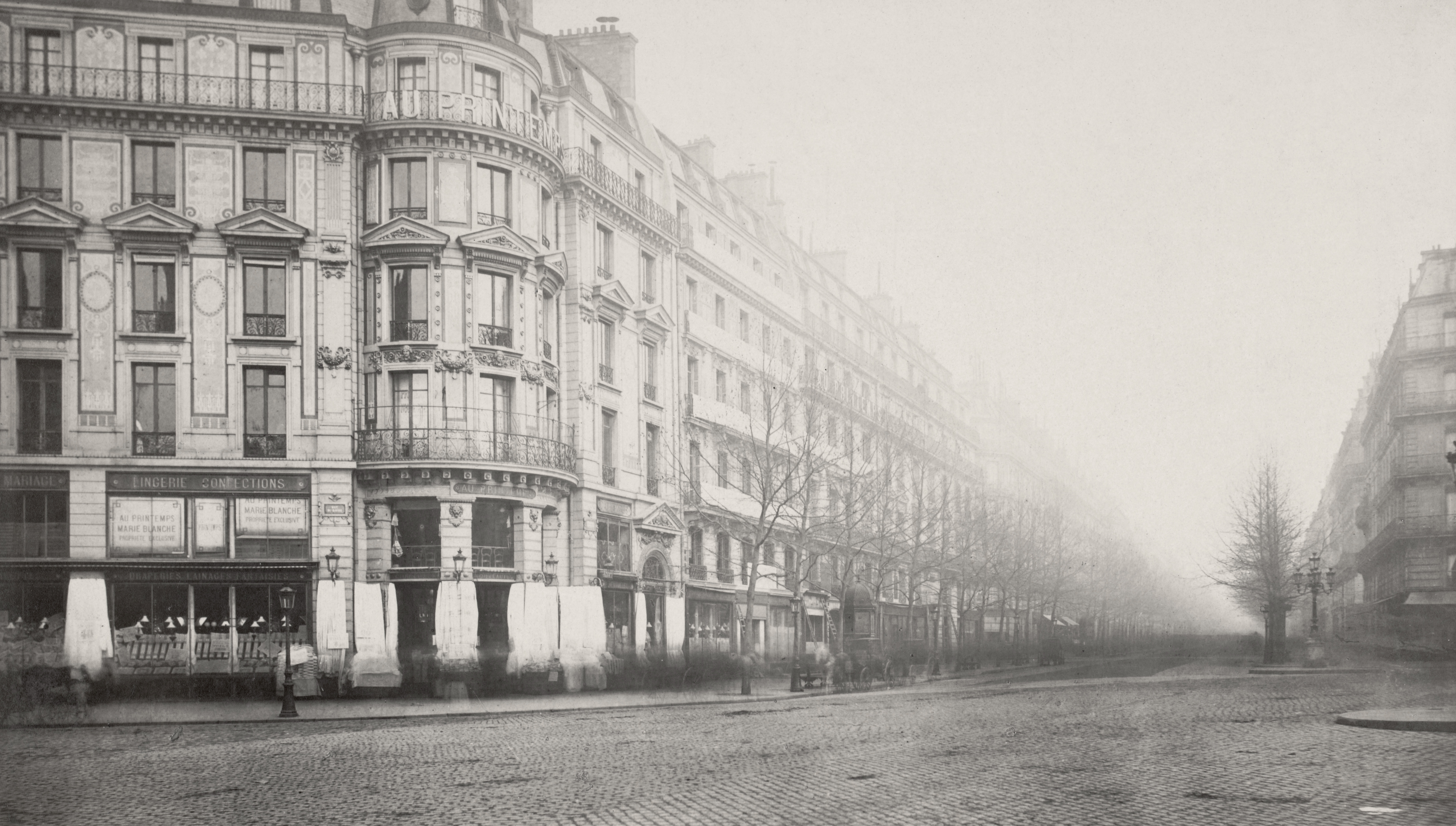
An early photograph of the Printemps Haussmann, c. 1865–70

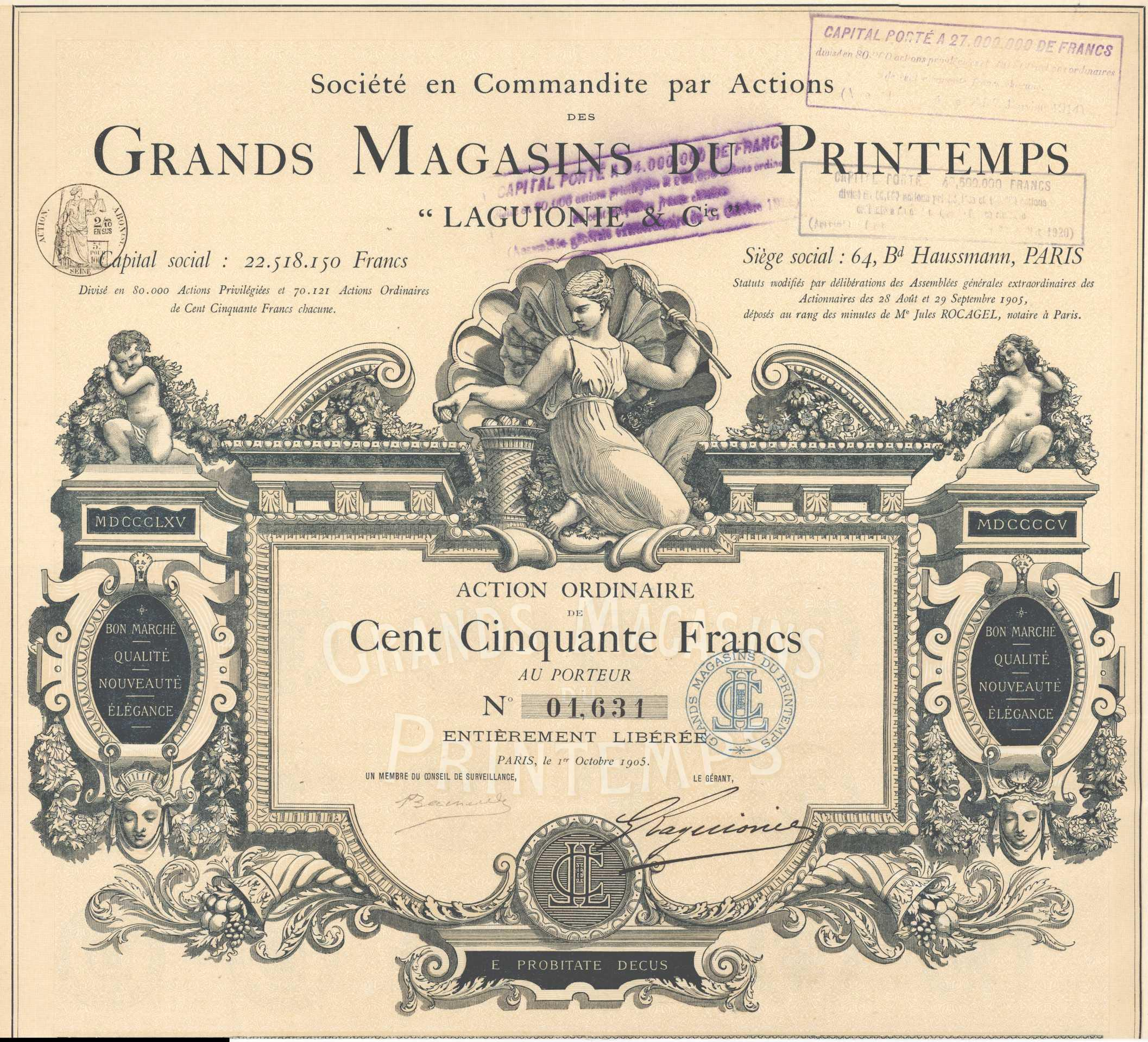
Share of the Grands Magasins du Printemps, issued 1. October 1905

The store became one of the first department stores with direct metro access when the Métro was connected in 1904. In 1905 Jules Jaluzot resigned from his position after causing the near collapse of the business, being accused of embezzling funds and his involvement in a sugar market manipulation scandal. He was succeeded by Gustave Laguionie, who announced the construction of a second store in 1905. Designed by architect René Binet, the store opened five years later and was dominated by a glass domed hall 42 meters in height and an Art Nouveau staircase which was later removed in 1955. The first store outside of Paris was opened in 1912 in Deauville.

Pierre Laguionie, the son of Gustave, took the helm of the store in 1920, rebuilding it after another large fire in 1921. In 1923 with the reconstruction of the Haussmann store an elaborate cupola was installed above the main restaurant. Pierre Laguionie was the first president of the International Association of Department Stores in from 1928 to 1930, a position he held again in from 1937 to 1938 and 1952 to 1953. Jean Vignéras held the position from 1962 to 1963 and Jean-Jacques Delort was president from 1981 to 1982.

In 1931, Printemps created the discount chain Prisunic. In 1939 to avoid the risk of the cupola being destroyed in bombing attacks it was dismantled and stored at Clichy. It was restored in 1973 by the grandson of its original designer, using plans that had been kept in the archives of the family business. In 1975, the façade and cupola of the building were registered as historical monuments.

In 1946, Printemps alongside Åhlén & Holm, Au Grand Passage (Geneva), Bon Marché (Brussels), Grands Magasins Jelmoli, L'Innovation (Lausanne), Rinascente, S.A.P.A.C. (Printemps purchasing association) and Selfridges founded the Intercontinental Group of Department Stores.

By 1970 there were 23 Printemps locations and 13 Prisunic discount outlets. The oil-price driven French economic crisis of the early 1970s significantly threatened Printemps business model, in response the firm was transformed into a limited corporation with a controlling interest acquired by Maus Fréres, a Swiss holding company. During the 1970s Jean-Jacques Delort led the company on a turnaround strategy creating specialty stores and brands (such as Armand Thierry clothing) and branching out into different areas such as food and mail.

In 1980 the Nancy-based Magasins Réunis became affiliated with Printemps and in 1983 in a franchise agreement all branches were rebranded to Printemps. The Lefroid department store in Tours was rebranded to Printemps in 1984.

The ex-Magasins Réunis stores on Avenue Ternes, Place de la République (Paris), and in Cherbourg were sold by the family who owned Magasins Réunis to l'Omnium commercial et financier in 1988. Printemps purchased the Nancy store that was held by the family under a franchise agreement.

In 1991 Printemps and its subsidiaries were acquired by François Pinault and merged with other holdings into Pinault-Printemps-Redoute (PPR, was renamed Kering in 2013). Printemps spent $40 million to renovate the flagship Haussmann store in 1997 the renovation redesigned the entire store and also added TV screens and music listening stations around the store whilst also refreshing the brands that the store stocked.

=== 2000s ===
Previous Printemps logo, in use from 2000 until 2022

In 2006, Printemps was sold to Deutsche Bank (70%) and the Italian Borletti Group (30%), they then made major investments to revamp stores.

On 16 December 2008, the Paris department store Printemps Haussmann was evacuated following a bomb threat from the terrorist group FRA (Afghan Revolutionary Front). The demining services found five sticks of dynamite in the toilet of the store. The FRA claimed this attack and demanded the withdrawal of 3,000 French soldiers deployed in Afghanistan.

=== 2010s ===
On 31 July 2013, Divine Investments SA (DiSA), a Luxembourg-based investment fund backed by Sheikh Hamad bin Khalifa Al Thani of Qatar, purchased Printemps. On 4 August 2013 labor organisations in France asked the Paris prosecutor's office to open a preliminary inquiry into the sale, in response to a complaint from labour representatives. On 8 August the French court rejected the request to stop the sale.

On 15 January 2014, Printemps opened its first new store in 32 years at the Carrousel du Louvre shopping mall in Paris. The store closed in 2023. The next year a new store opened at Polygone Riviera in Cagnes-sur-Mer.

=== 2020s ===
In 2020 due to the COVID-19 pandemic it was announced that four Printemps stores would close (Le Havre, Strasbourg, Metz & Place d'Italie). However, the Le Havre store did not close and in 2022 was purchased by the franchisee of Printemps Caen.

An outlet opened at the McArthurGlen Paris-Giverny mall in mid-2024. In November 2024 it was revealed that Printemps would be forced to close the Polygone Riviera store, with the centre’s new owners planning on converting it into entertainment park.

Jean-Marc Bellaiche stepped down as president of Printemps in September 2025 after "five years of transformation". Under his leadership the Printemps Group had returned to profitability and e-commerce sales increased to form 10% of all Printemps revenues. He was replaced by Rémy Baume in June 2026. Baume, previously served in executive positions at The Kooples, LVMH, Zadig&Voltaire, and began has career as a financial analyst at Morgan Stanley.

Les Magasins Jean, operator of Printemps in Brest (the parent company of Magasins Jean was Rallye), entered liquidation in March 2026 and the store was closed. In April 2026 it was announced that plans were in place to eliminate 229 positions at the company (with 17 to be modified and 91 created) and close the Rennes-Alma branch due to "major upheaval in the apparel sector,".

== Store locations and opening timeline ==
As of 2026, Printemps operates eighteen stores in France (including two outlet locations), along with two international locations in Doha, Qatar and New York City, United States.

| Printemps stores permanently closed |
| Printemps stores currently in operation |
| Printemps stores planned to open |

=== France ===
| Metropolitan area ("metro") | Suburb or Neighborhood | Name/Location/Notes | Size | Opened | Closed |
|---|---|---|---|---|---|
| Paris | 9th arrondissement | Printemps Haussmann On the corner of Boulevard Haussmann and Rue du Havre. Future Printemps Homme. Gradually expanded to take up the entire block (Havre, Haussmann, Provence, Caumartin). | | 1865 | 1881 |
| Paris | 9th arrondissement | Printemps Haussmann Rue de Provence. Future Printemps Beauté, Maison, Enfant. | | 1874 | 1881 |
| Paris | 9th arrondissement | Printemps Haussmann | | 1883 | 1921 |
| Paris | 9th arrondissement | Printemps Haussmann | | 1883 | 1921 |
| Paris | 9th arrondissement | Printemps Haussmann Now Printemps Femme. | | 1910 | 1921 |
| Deauville | Place François André | Printemps Deauville | 1,200 m^{2} (12,917 sq ft) | 1912 | open |
| Paris | 9th arrondissement | Printemps Haussmann (Homme, Goût) On Boulevard Haussmann. | 45,000 m^{2} (484,376 sq ft) | 1925 | open |
| Paris | 9th arrondissement | Printemps Haussmann (Femme) On Boulevard Haussmann. | 45,000 m^{2} (484,376 sq ft) | 1925 | open |
| Paris | 9th arrondissement | Printemps Haussmann (Beauté, Maison, Enfant) Previously the Men's (Homme) building until 2017. | 45,000 m^{2} (484,376 sq ft) | 1925 | open |
| Rouen | Place de la Cathédrale | Printemps Rouen | 6,800 m^{2} (73,195 sq ft) | 1928 | open |
| Le Havre | Coty | Printemps Le Havre Located at Espace Coty. Franchised location under the control of Toscaleo Conseil. | 3,350 m^{2} (36,059 sq ft) | 1928 | open |
| Lille | Lille-Centre | Printemps Lille | 13,130 m^{2} (141,330 sq ft) | 1929 | open |
| Bordeaux | Bordeaux Centre | Printemps Bordeaux Previously Familia. | | 1934 | 20 May 1989 |
| Lyon | Place de la République | Printemps Lyon | 7,000 m^{2} (75,347 sq ft) | 1938 | open |
| Poitiers | Place du Maréchal Leclerc | Printemps Poitiers Destroyed by fire, rebuilt and reopened in 1965. | | 1940 | 30 May 1961 |
| Auxerre | Centre-Ville | Printemps Auxerre Previously Soisson & James. | | 1963 | closed (1990s) |
| Paris | Place de la Nation | Printemps Nation Located on Cours de Vincennes | 10,000 m^{2} (107,639 sq ft) | 1964 | open |
| Poitiers | Place du Maréchal Leclerc | Printemps Poitiers | | 7 September 1965 | 28 January 2012 |
| Paris | Le Chesnay-Rocquencourt | Printemps Parly 2 Located at Parly 2. | 10,450 m^{2} (112,483 sq ft) | 1969 | open |
| Rennes | Quartier Bréquigny | Printemps Alma Located at Westfield Rennes Alma. | 6,110 m^{2} (65,767 sq ft) | 1971 | open (set to close in the future) |
| Paris | Vélizy-Villacoublay | Printemps Vélizy 2 Located at Vélizy 2. | 10,481 m^{2} (112,817 sq ft) | 1972 | open |
| Paris | Créteil | Printemps Créteil Soleil Located at Créteil Soleil. | | 1974 | 1978 |
| Metz | Metz Old Town | Printemps Metz | 6,000 m^{2} (64,583 sq ft) | 1974 | 30 November 2021 |
| Paris | Place d'Italie | Printemps Italie 2 / Printemps Italie Located at Italie 2. Previously Au Bon Marché. | 5,940 m^{2} (63,938 sq ft) | 1976 | 2021 |
| Toulon | La Valette-du-Var | Printemps Grand Var Located at Grand Var. | 8,300 m^{2} (89,340 sq ft) | 1978 | open |
| Strasbourg | Place de l'Homme de Fer | Printemps Strasbourg | 7,000 m^{2} (75,347 sq ft) | 1979 | 30 December 2021 |
| Marseilles | La Valentine | Printemps Valentine Located at Centre Valentine. | 7,228 m^{2} (77,802 sq ft) | 1982 | open |
| Nancy | Place Simone-Veil | Printemps Nancy Previously Magasins Réunis. | 6,055 m^{2} (65,175 sq ft) | 1983 | open |
| Alençon | | Printemps Alençon Previously Magasins Réunis. | | 1983 | 1995 |
| Cherbourg | Centre-Ville | Printemps Cherbourg Previously Magasins Réunis. | | 1983 | closed (early 1990s) |
| Épinal | Place des 4 Nations | Printemps Épinal Previously Magasins Réunis. | | 1983 | closed (late 1980s) |
| Paris | 11th arrondissement | Printemps Place de la République Previously Magasins Réunis. | | 1983 | closed |
| Paris | 17th arrondissement | Printemps Avenue Ternes Previously Magasins Réunis. | | 1983 | closed (early 1990s) |
| Brest | Brest Centre | Printemps Brest Franchised location under the control of Rallye. Previously Magasins Jean. | 3,000 m^{2} (32,292 sq ft) | 1984 | 24 March 2026 |
| Tours | Quartier Grammont | Printemps Tours Previously Lefroid. | | 1984 | open |
| Caen | Saint-Jean | Printemps Caen Franchised location under the control of Toscaleo Conseil. Previously Au Bon Marché. | | 1989 | open |
| Paris | Beaubourg | Printemps Design Located at Centre Pompidou. | | 1 January 2000 | 2011 |
| Paris | 1st arrondissement | Printemps du Louvre Located at the Carrousel du Louvre. | 2,600 m^{2} (27,986 sq ft) | 15 January 2014 | 2023 |
| Marseilles | Arenc | Printemps Les Terrases du Port Located at Les Terrases du Port. | 6,000 m^{2} (64,583 sq ft) | 24 May 2014 | open |
| Nice | Cagnes-sur-Mer | Printemps Polygone Riviera Located at Polygone Riviera. | 6,320 m^{2} (68,028 sq ft) | 2015 | March 2025 |
| Aix-Marseille-Provence | Miramas | Printemps Outlet Miramas Located at MacArthurGlen Designer Outlet Provence. | 600 m^{2} (6,458 sq ft) | 2017 | open |
| Eure | Douains | Printemps Outlet Giverny Located at MacArthurGlen Designer Outlet Paris-Giverny. | 560 m^{2} (6,028 sq ft) | 2024 | open |

=== International ===
| Metropolitan area ("metro") | Suburb or Neighborhood | Name/Location/Notes | Size | Opened | Closed |
|---|---|---|---|---|---|
| Avricourt, Alsace–Lorraine (Alsace-Lorraine) | | Export counter | | 1872 | |
| Yokohama, Japan | | Export counter | | 1887 | 1889 |
| Tangiers, Morocco | | Export counter | | 1891 | |
| Antananarivo, Madagascar | Place de l'Indépendance | Printemps Tananarive Converted to Prisunic. | | 1930s (either 1930 or 1937) | Before 1970 after 1953 |
| Beirut, Lebanon | Saifi Village | Byblos affiliés au Printemps | | 1960 (later affiliated with Printemps) | 1975 |
| Singapore | Orchard Road | Printemps Singapore Located at Méridien Shopping Complex (now Concorde Hotel Singapore). | 4,416 m^{2} (47,533 sq ft) | September 1983 | 24 December 1989 |
| Tokyo, Japan | Ginza | Printemps Ginza Located at 3-2-1 Ginza, Chuo-ku. | | 1984 | 2016 |
| Jeddah, Saudi Arabia | corner of Palestine and Setten Road | Printemps Al Amoudi Located at Middle East Shopping Center, later Elysee Printemps Center. | | 1984 | 2006 |
| Petaling Jaya, Malaysia | Damansara Jaya | | | 26 July 1984 | 1987 |
| Kuala Lumpur, Malaysia | Bukit Bintang | Located at KL Plaza. | | 1985 | 1987 |
| Denver, United States | Baker | Printemps Denver Located at Broadway Plaza. | 8,826 m^{2} (95,000 sq ft) | 6 November 1987 | April 1989 |
| Seoul, South Korea | Myeong-dong | Printemps 프랭탕백화점 Located at the Janggyo building. | | 1 September 1988 | 1997 |
| Istanbul, Turkey | Ataköy | Located at Galleria Ataköy. | | 1988 | Spring 1997 |
| Lisbon, Portugal | Cascais | Located at CascaiShopping. | | 15 May 1991 | circa. 1999 |
| Bangkok, Thailand | Prawet | Located at Seri Center. | | 1994 | |
| Taipei, Taiwan | Xinyi | Printemps Taipei | | March 1995 | 2002 |
| Taoyuan, Taiwan | | | | 1998 | |
| Istanbul, Turkey | Ataköy | Located at Galleria Ataköy. Reopened in the original Printemps space. | | 1998 | 2000 |
| Andorra la Vella, Andorra | Avinguda Meritxell | Printemps Andorra / Pyrénées Located at 9 and 11 Avinguda Meritxell. | | | 2009 |
| Doha, Qatar | Mushaireb | Printemps Doha Located at the Doha Oasis shopping complex. | 40,000 m^{2} (430,556 sq ft) | 25 November 2022 | open |
| New York City, United States | Financial District | Printemps New York Located at 1 Wall Street. | 5,000 m^{2} (53,820 sq ft) | 13 March 2025 (soft opening) 21 March 2025 (official opening) | open |

== International expansion ==
=== Africa and the Middle East ===
In the 1930s a store opened in Antananarivo, Madagascar, the store was later converted into a Prisunic. A Printemps store (Printemps Al Amoudi) opened in Jeddah, Saudi Arabia in 1984. The Jeddah store was closed in 2006.

Printemps Doha opened in November 2022 at Doha Oasis in Doha, Qatar. The store is the largest department store in the Middle East at over 40,000 m^{2} (430,000 sq ft) and the brands second largest store it includes 14 restaurants and over 200 brands exclusive to the store. The store is a franchise ran by a company related to Printemps owner Disa.

=== Asia ===
The first Asian Printemps opened in 1887 in Yokohama, Japan. The store was an 'export counter', and closed two years later in 1889.

Beirut's Byblos department store was affiliated with Printemps until the Lebanese Civil War led to its closure in 1975.

In 1981, the company entered a period of international expansion by franchising stores starting with the opening of a location in Kobe, Japan, they continued the expansion a year later opening a store in Sapporo. The Japanese stores were opened in a partnership with Daiei. Printemps expanded to Singapore with its first store located at the ground floor of the newly built Le Méridien Hotel on Orchard Road (now a Concorde Hotel). The original plan was for the store to be located at Goldhill Square. Owned by Town & City Properties Ltd, the store opened on 8 September 1983 and closed on 24 December 1989 with 65 of its staff being retrenched.

Printemps expanded to Malaysia under an exclusive 25-year franchise agreement with Larut Tin Fields Berhad through its subsidiary City Chemist Holdings. Its first store at Damansara Jaya, Petaling Jaya opened on 26 July 1984, with a second store at Kuala Lumpur Plaza opening in 1985. Printemps stores in Malaysia were closed in 1987. Two more stores opened in Japan in Ginza (1984) and Osaka.

Printemps opened in Seoul on 1 September 1988, located in the Myeong-dong neighbourhood. The store closed in 1997. An Istanbul store also opened in 1988, located at Galleria Ataköy.

In 1994 a store opened in Bangkok, Thailand at Seri Center. In March 1995 a location opened in the Xinyi district of Taipei, the store opened under a franchise agreement and was operated by the Taiwan-based Jieh Enterprises. A second Taiwanese store opened in Taoyuan in 1998. Printemps also expanded into China in June 1995 with a six floor store opening on Huaihai Road in Shanghai. Plans were announced for two more Chinese stores to open in 1996 (Dalian, Chengdu) and then a Beijing store in 1997.

Printemps Istanbul closed in Spring 1997, however, it reopened in 1998 in the same location in a new partnership. Plans were also in place to open a second Istanbul store, which never eventuated and Printemps at Galleria Ataköy closed in 2000.

Printemps Taipei closed in 2002.

In 2013, the Beijing-based Wangfujing Department Store which was a rival of Printemps in China acquired Printemps China (PCD Stores). In 2017 the last international store closed in Ginza, Tokyo and was converted into an extension of the nearby Marronnier Gate department store, the closing of the store ended the second period of international expansion.

Srettha Thavisin invited Printemps to open a store in Thailand, following a showcase of Thai fashion at Printemps Haussmann in March 2024.

Printemps is currently planning to open a store in Asia and is aiming to have 5-10 new stores by 2030 all of which will be located outside of France.

=== Europe ===
On 15 May 1991 a store opened at CascaiShopping in Cascais (Lisbon), Portugal. It closed around 1999. Printemps also controlled the Pyrénées department store in Andorra as 'Printemps Andorra' till 2009.

=== United States ===
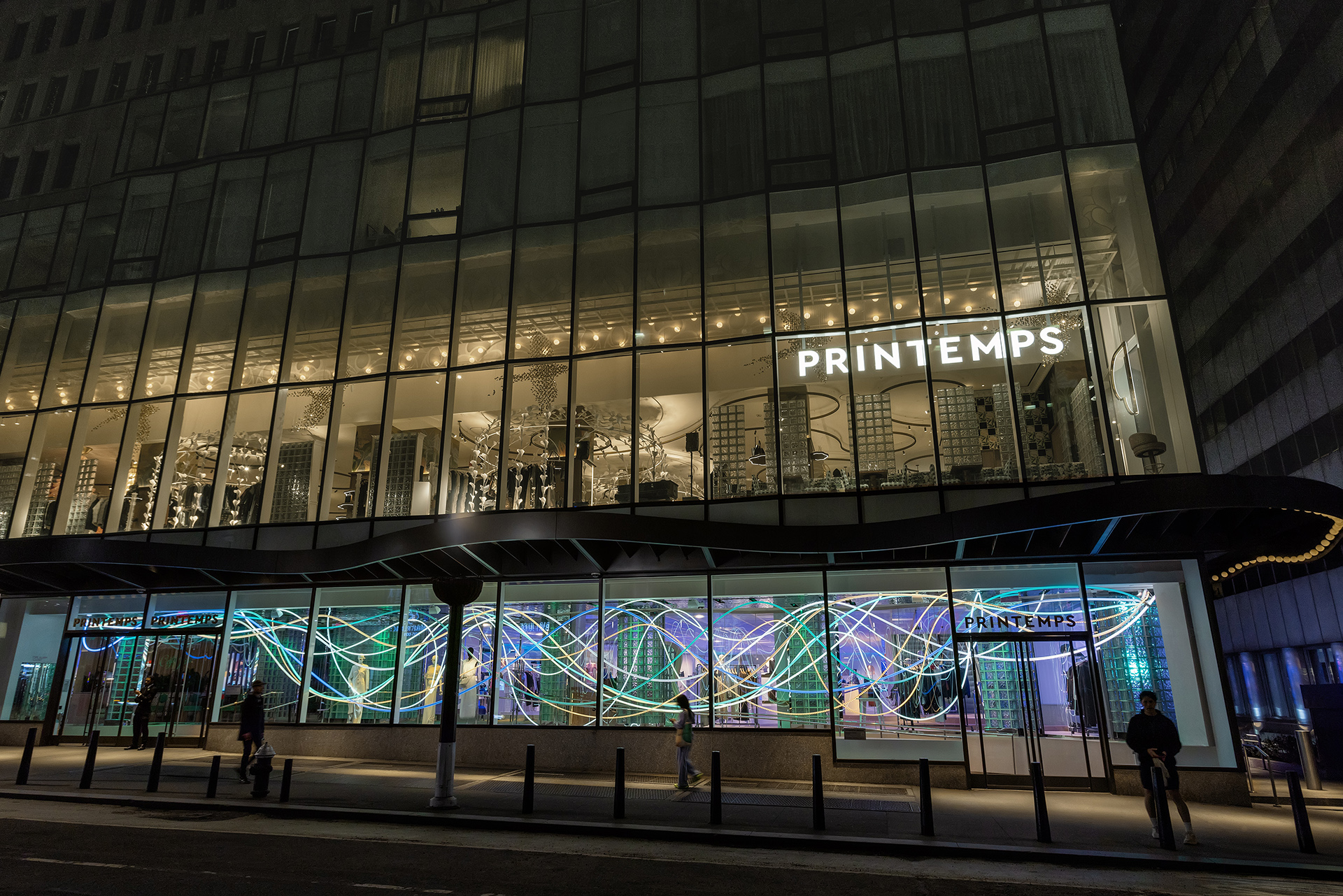
Printemps storefront at 1 Wall Street, featuring a light installation from Grimanesa Amorós.

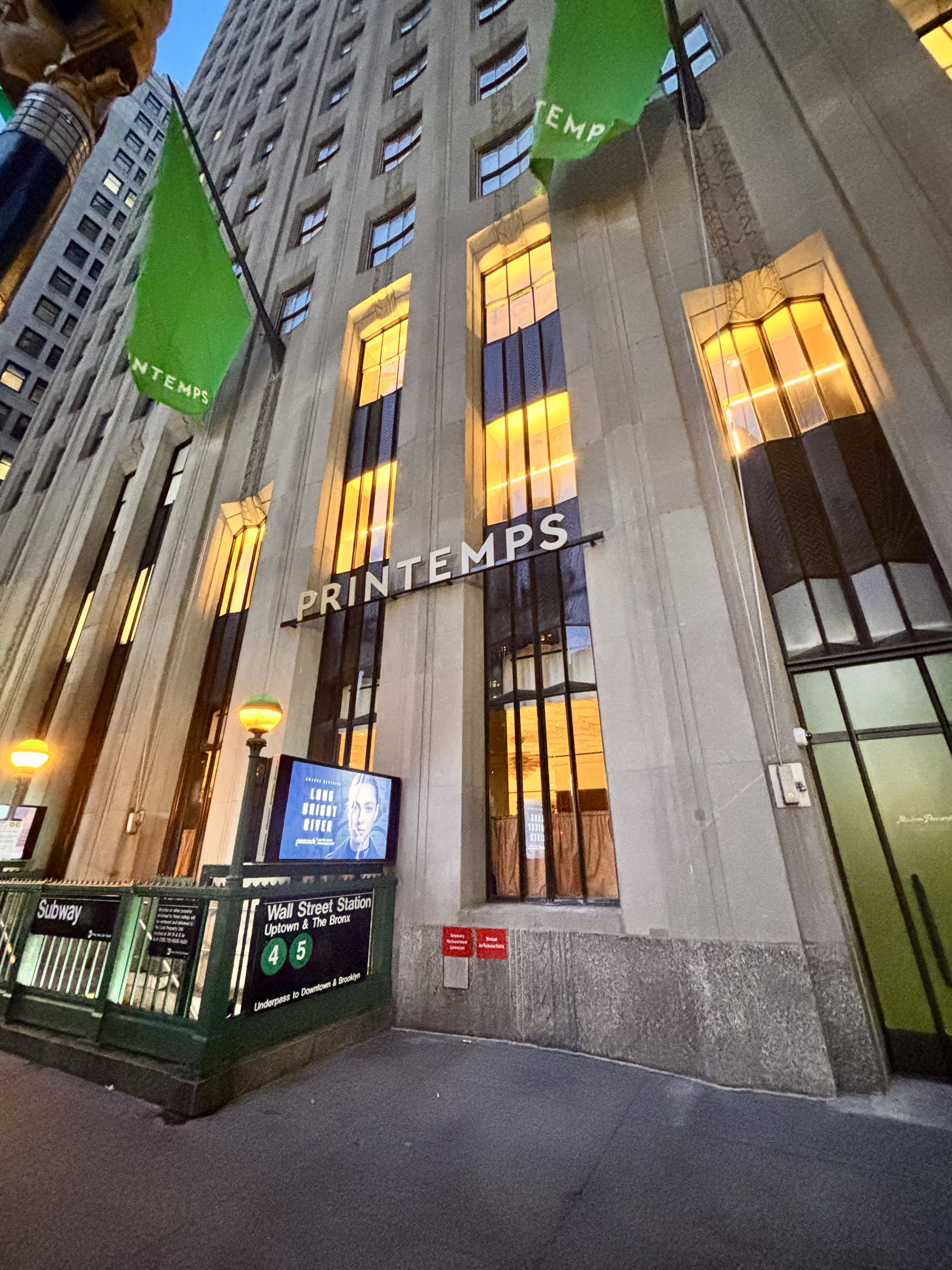
Printemps store in New York City

Printemps opened its first store in the United States on 6 November 1987, at the Broadway Plaza in Denver, Colorado. Printemps Denver was approximately 8,826 square metres (95,000 sq ft), and included a French bistro. Business slowed after the first few months, and a shuttle bus began to transport customers from Downtown Denver. The store closed in April 1989.

In September 2022, Printemps announced that they would open a two-level 5,000 square metres (54,000 sq ft) store at One Wall Street in New York City. The store held its grand opening attended by Vogue editor-in-chief Anna Wintour and Groupe Printemps president Jean-Marc Bellaiche on 21 March 2025. The store interior was designed by Laura Gonzalez. Gregory Gourdet was appointed as culinary director of the store, overseeing Maison Passerelle, Salon Vert, Café Jalu, and the Red Room Bar. Printemps New York is designed to be the pied-à-terre to the Paris Haussmann store, it contains the landmarked Red Room with mosaics designed by Hildreth Meière. The Deauville branch acted as a testing space for Printemps New York following its 2023 renovation, as like the New York store it now contains no leased store-within-a-store spaces. Upon opening, the 'boudoir' department (vintage clothing, evening-wear, couture, fine jewellery) featured an exhibition of Jean Paul Gaultier pieces. The American online store launched in late 2025.

In May 2025, Laura Lendrum stepped down as CEO of Printemps America, joining the Printemps America advisory board as chairman. Lendrum had been in the role since 2021, she was replaced by Thierry Prevost. Prevost previously led the launch of Printemps Doha as general manager and briefly served as managing director of Printemps New York.

In February 2026, a light installation by Grimanesa Amorós was installed within Printemps New York. It remained on display until mid-March 2026. Café Jalu was temporarily rebranded to Elle Café Jalu for Summer 2026 in a French Rivieria-inspired takeover by womens lifestyle magazine Elle.

=== Cancelled openings ===
In the early-mid 1980s there were plans to open a branch in Hong Kong, however, these plans never eventuated.

A franchise at Ratu Plaza in Jakarta planned to open in 1998 and was under construction but due to the Asian financial crisis and the subsequent May 1998 riots the store opening was cancelled. In May 2019 plans were announced to open a store in Galleria Vittorio Emanuele in Milan. It would be 2,500 square metres (27,000 sq ft), planned to open in 2021. Due to the COVID-19 pandemic the store was scrapped.

== Private-label brands ==
Like many other retailers, Printemps sells goods under a range of its own private label brands.

- Au Printemps Paris (homegoods-only since 2022)
- Brummell (men's; discontinued)
- Saison 1865 (introduced in 2022)

== Gallery ==
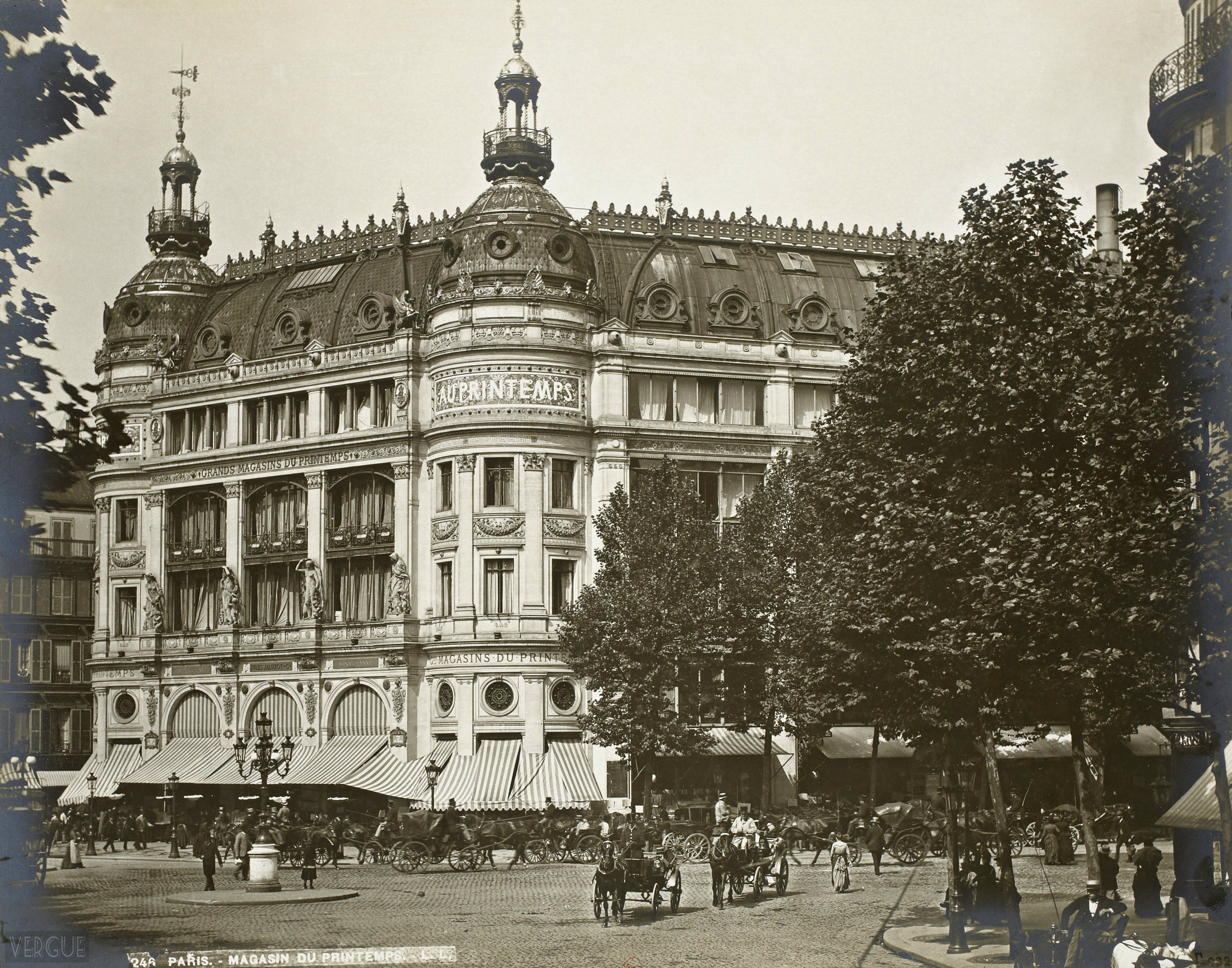
The Printemps Haussmann with its new façade, c. 1889

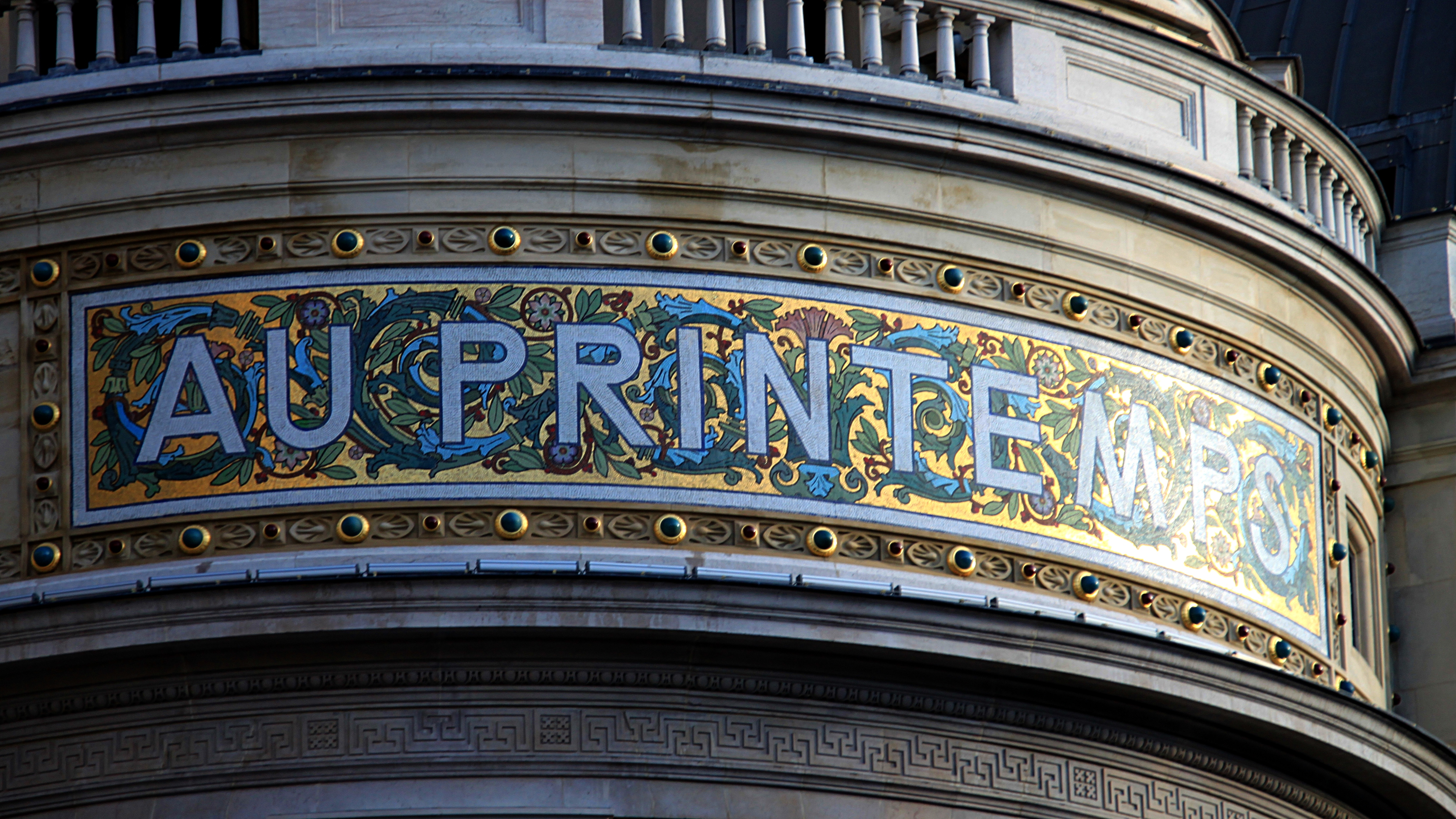
One of the Printemps Haussmann's frontage mosaics, reading 'Au Printemps' ('At the Printemps')

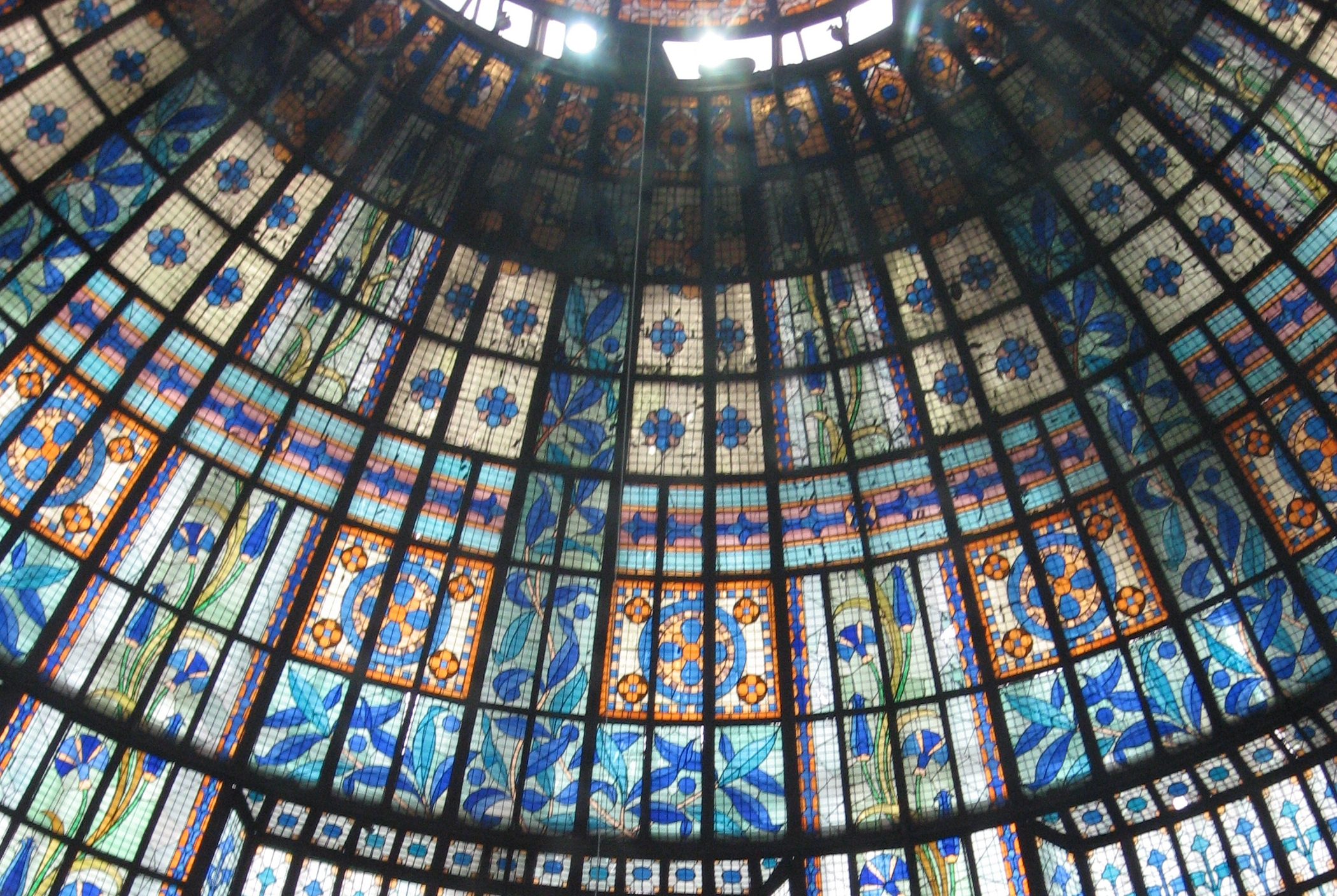
Detail of the cupola above the tearoom of the Printemps Haussmann

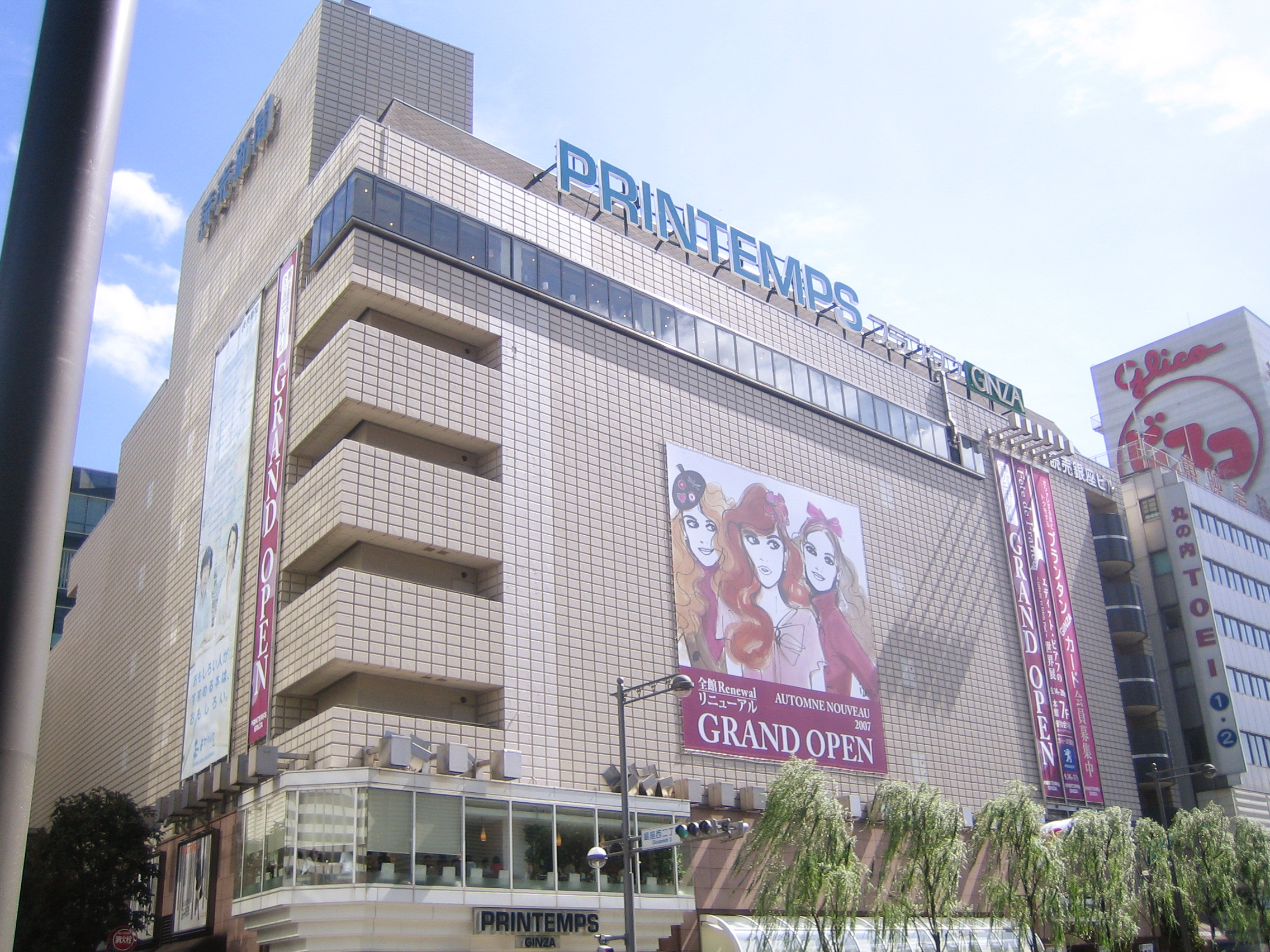
Printemps Ginza in 2007

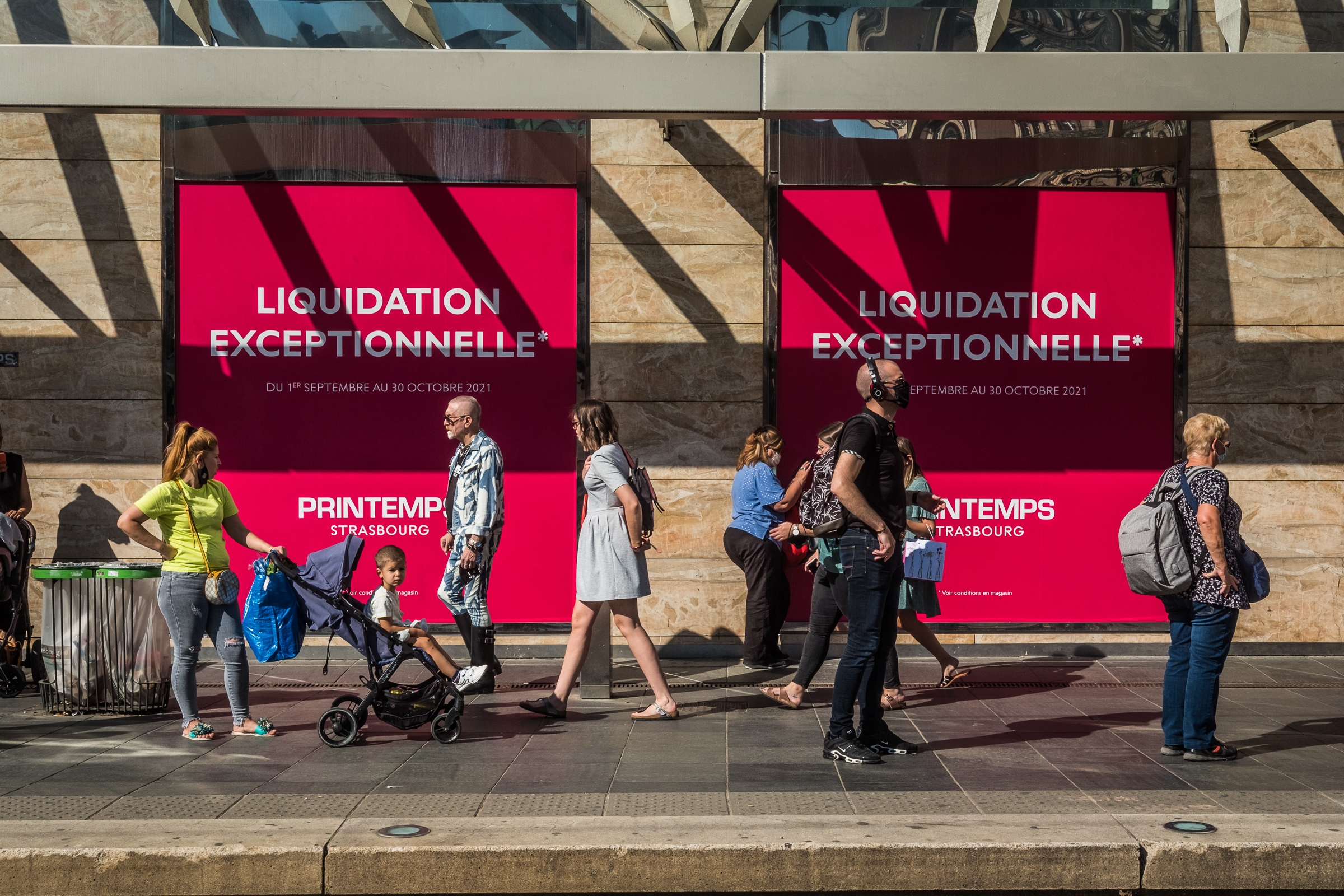
Liquidation sale at the Strasbourg store

== See also ==
- List of works by Henri Chapu
- Printemps Haussmann
