= Théâtre Montansier =

Théâtre Montansier can refer to three different theatres built by Mademoiselle Montansier:

- Théâtre Montansier (Versailles), Montansier's theatre in Versailles (opened 18 November 1777)
- Théâtre du Palais-Royal in Paris, known as the Théâtre Montansier in 1790, 1800, and 1848–1852
- Théâtre National (rue de la Loi), her theatre on the rue de la Loi (rue de Richelieu) in Paris (opened 15 August 1793; demolished 1820)
