= Broadway Plaza =

Broadway Plaza is the name of various places:

- The Bloc Los Angeles - former name 1980s-1990s
- Broadway Plaza (Rochester, Minnesota), the tallest building in Rochester.
- Broadway Plaza (Walnut Creek), a shopping mall in Walnut Creek, California
- Broadway Plaza (Denver), a shopping mall in Denver, Colorado
- Broadway Plaza, a shopping mall in Bronx, New York
- Broadway Plaza, an entertainment complex in Five Ways, Birmingham, England
- Kesey Square, the square in Eugene, Oregon formerly known as Broadway Plaza
