= Printemps Haussmann =

Department store in Paris, France

- Magasin du Printemps (French)
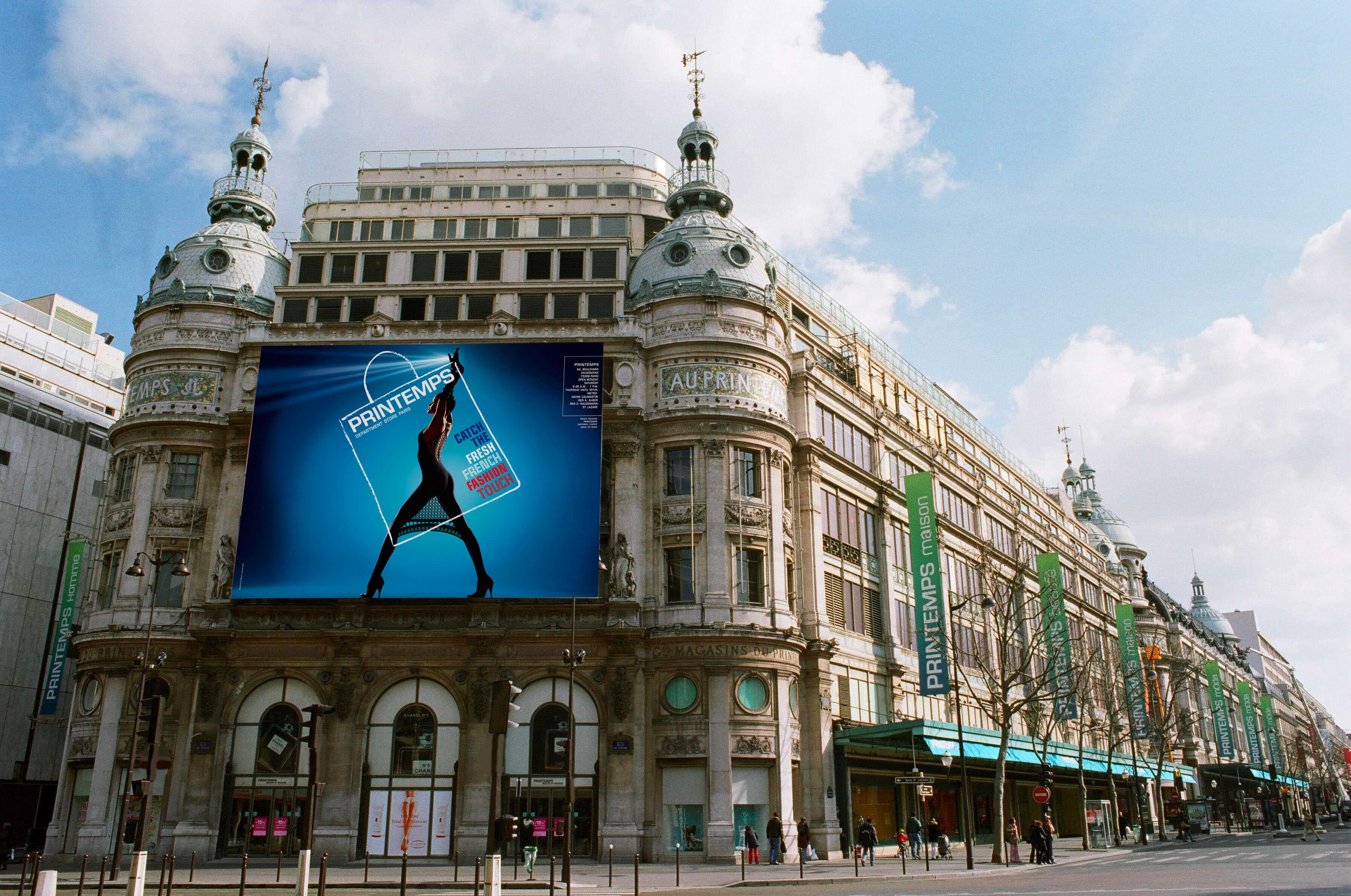
- Exterior of Printemps Haussmann (2007)
- Interactive map of the Printemps Haussmann area

General information
- Status: Open
- Type: Department store
- Architectural style: Art Nouveau
- Location: 64 Boulevard Haussmann, Paris, France
- Coordinates: 48.873887°N 2.329051°E
- Current tenants: Printemps
- Opened: 3 November 1865; 160 years ago
- Client: Jules Jaluzot; Augustine Jaluzot; Jean-Alfred Duclos
- Owner: Printemps Group

Technical details
- Floor count: 7 (main building); 9 (de la Mode); 11 (de la Beauté et de la Maison)
- Floor area: 44,000 square metres (470,000 sq ft) of selling space

Design and construction
- Architect: Paul Sédille

Other information
- Public transit access: Paris Métro: Havre–Caumartin

Website
- Store information

Monument historique
- Designated: 8 July 1992
- Reference no.: PA00088988

Printemps Haussmann (French: Magasin du Printemps) is a department store building on Boulevard Haussmann in the 9th arrondissement of Paris, France. It was designed by Paul Sédille for Jules Jaluzot, Augustine Jaluzot, and Jean-Alfred Duclos, and opened in 1865. It is the flagship store of the Printemps department store chain, and spans 44,000 square metres (470,000 sq ft) of selling space between three interconnected buildings. The store was designated a monument historique by the French Ministry of Culture in 1992.

== Architecture ==
Printemps Haussmann spans 27 floors between three interconnected buildings: seven in the main building, nine in the "Printemps de la Mode" building, and 11 in the "Printemps de la Beauté et de la Maison" building. The second and third structures were constructed in 1874 after business volume in the first store exceeded capacity, and were linked to each other by iron footbridges. It was the first department store to feature modern hydraulic elevators with this expansion. The store was destroyed by fire in 1881, and after being rebuilt with designs by architects Jules and Paul Sédille, became the first public place in Paris to be powered by electricity in 1883. An interior dome extending from the ground level to the ninth floor was completed in 2018, and was inspired by the domes made of stained glass that were installed in 1894.

Printemps Haussman is adjacent to the flagship store of the competing Galeries Lafayette stores, and is also located near the Palais Garnier. It is next to Havre–Caumartin station, serving Line 3 and Line 9 of the Paris Métro.

== Incidents ==
On 16 December 2008, Printemps Haussmann was evacuated following a bomb threat from the terrorist group FRA (Afghan Revolutionary Front). The demining services found five sticks of dynamite in the toilet of the store. The FRA claimed this assassination attempt and demanded the withdrawal of 3,000 French soldiers deployed in Afghanistan.
