= Jacqueline Pradère =

Frenc-born Andorran businesswoman (1926–2025)

Jacqueline Pradère (1926 – 5 November 2025) was a French-born Andorran businesswoman and philanthropist, considered one of the most important figures in Andorra's commercial development due to her role in consolidating the Grans Magatzems Pyrénées.

== Life and career ==
Pradère was born in Toulouse, France in 1926. After marrying George Pérez, the couple moved to Andorra in 1954, where Pérez's parents, Spanish refugees from the Spanish Civil War founded hotel Pyrénées in the 1930s.

Pradère and Pérez ended up expanding the hotel business with commercial, automotive and catering services, eventually founding the Grans Magatzems Pyrénées. After becoming a widow in 1973, Pradère took on a key role in ensuring the continuity of the business, consolidating it as a business group and a benchmark for modern commerce in Andorra. Their work also led to the creation of new businesses thanks to their cooperation.

In 2009, she founded the Jacqueline Pradère Private Foundation, a foundation aimed at helping employees in difficulty and collaborating with non-profit associations and institutions such as the Association against Cancer.

== Death ==
Pradère died on 4 November 2025 at the age of 99 after a long illness. Prime Minister of Andorra Xavier Espot mourned her death and called her "a pioneer of commerce in Andorra and a citizen committed to social causes".

== Honours ==
- Legion of Honour (France, 2010)
