= Paul Sédille =

French architect (1836–1900)

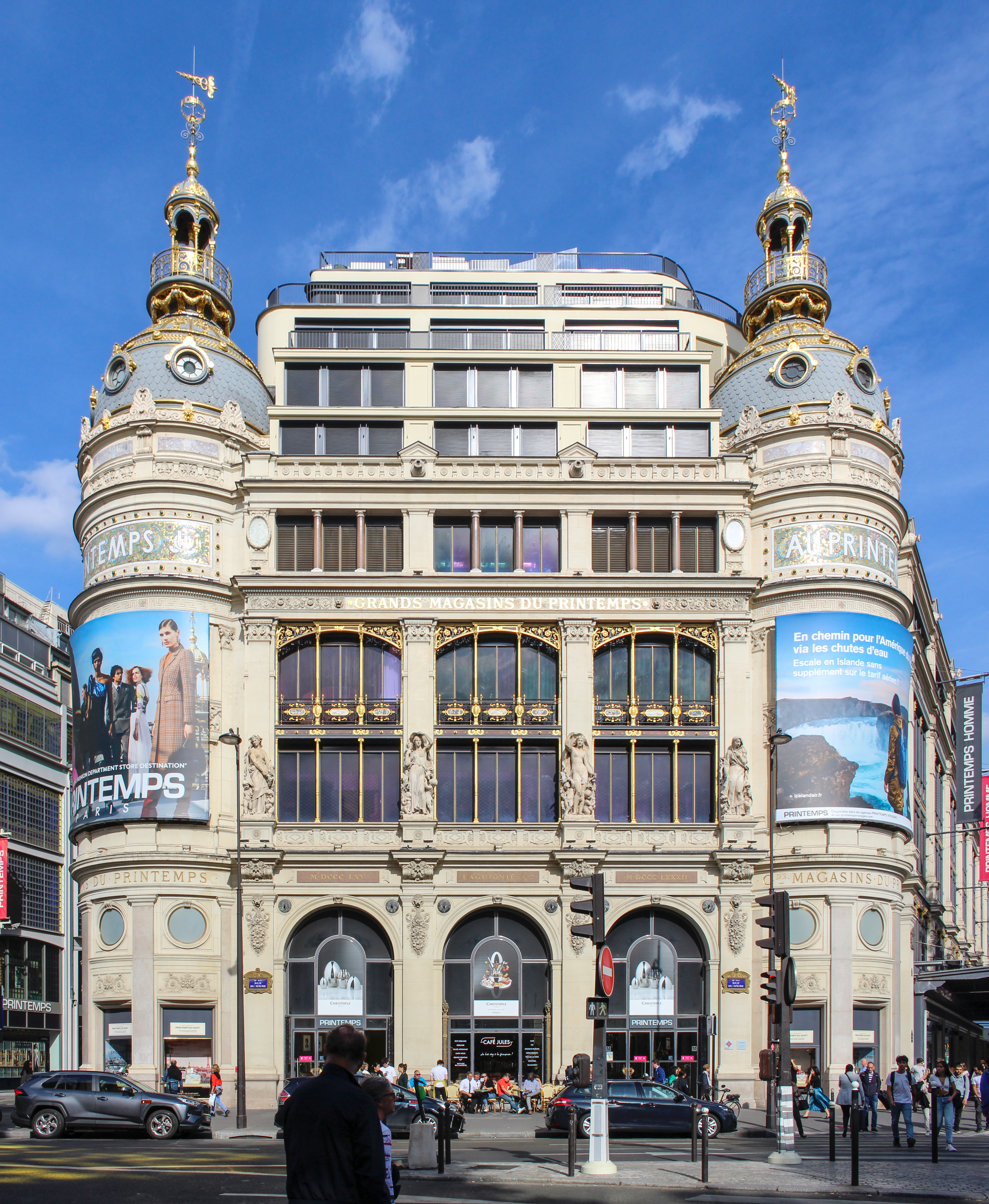
facade, Printemps department store, Paris

Paul Sédille (16 June 1836, Paris – 6 January 1900) was a French architect and theorist; and designed the 1880 reconstruction of the iconic Magasins du Printemps department store in Paris.

== Life ==
Though Sédille is best known for his Printemps design, he was also associated with the Creusot family foundry and was very active in professional associations and architectural education in the 1880s. He wrote a number of compelling pieces of architectural criticism, especially his review of contemporary Viennese and British architecture, and reflected what were by and large Teutonic theoretical concerns that have come to be understood as architectural realism, based on the works of Gottfried Semper.

Directly related to his interest in Semper, Sédille was an advocate of highly-coloured polychrome architecture. His participation in the Universal Expositions of 1878 and 1889 in Paris were demonstration pieces of his approach of integrating colorful terra cotta tilework and structural into the vocabulary of classical, beaux-arts architectural forms.

Sédille made his mark as a private architect executing residential commissions during an age that celebrated heroic, civic works such as the Paris Opéra (1860–1875) by Charles Garnier or the Palais de Justice (Paris, 1857–68) by Joseph-Louis Duc and Honoré Daumet.

== Work ==
- renovation of the Théâtre du Palais-Royal, with interior work by sculptor Jules Dalou, Paris, 1880
- Basilique du Bois-Chenu, Domrémy-la-Pucelle (origin of Joan of Arc), begun 1881, consecrated 1896
- Printemps department store renovation, Paris, with sculptor Henri Chapu, 1883
- monument to industrialist Eugène Schneider, with sculptor Henri Chapu

== Bibliography ==
- (in French) Sédille, Paul. "Rapport présenté par la commission chargée d'examiner une proposition de M. Paul Sédille relative aux récompenses à décerner par la société centrale des architectes," Bulletin mensuel de la société centrale des architectes (1873): 72-76.
- (in French) Sédille, Paul. "Victor Baltard," Gazette des beaux-arts, 2ème pér., 9 (1874): 485-496.
- (in French) Sédille, Paul. "Rapport sur un brochure de M. Ruprich-Robert," Bulletin mensuel de la société centrale des architectes 4ème sér., 2 (1875): 43f.
- (in French) Sédille, Paul. "Joseph Louis Duc, Architecte," Encyclopédie d'architecture, 2ème sér., 8 (1879): 65-74.
- (in French) Sédille, Paul. "L'architecture contemporaine et les industries d'art qui s'y rattachent," Bulletin mensuel de la société centrale des architectes 6ème sér., 2 (1885): 28-33.
- (in French) Sédille, Paul. "Du rôle de la construction dans l'architecture," Encyclopédie d'architecture, 3ème sér., 4 (1885): 73f.
- (in French) Sédille, Paul. "L'architecture moderne à Vienne," Gazette des beaux-arts, 2ème pér., 30 (1884): 122-44, 460-67, 481-91. Reprinted in: Bulletin mensuel de la société centrale des architectes 6ème sér., 2 (1885): 196-222.
- (in French) Sédille, Paul. "Récompenses à l'architecture privée," Bulletin mensuel de la société centrale des architectes 6ème sér., 2 (1885): 411-18. Reprinted as: "Du rôle de la construction dans l'architecture," Encyclopédie d'architecture 3ème sér., 4 (1885): 73f.
- (in French) Sédille, Paul. "L'architecture moderne en Angleterre," Gazette des beaux-arts, 2ème pér., 33 (1886): 89-102, 194-208; 34 (1886): 89-106, 441-465; 35 (1887): 273-290.
- (in French) Sédille, Paul. "Étude sur la renaissance de la polychromie monumentale en France," Transactions of the Royal Institute of British Architects, n. s., 3 (1887): 5-16; with English translation, pp. 17–25. Also printed in: L'Architecture 1 (1888): 13-16, 37-40, 97-99.
- (in French) Sédille, Paul. "Charles Garnier," Gazette des beaux-arts, 3ème pér., 20 (1898): 341-346.
- (in French) Sédille, Paul. "Basilique de Jeanne d'Arc, Domrémy. Construction de la flèche," L'architecture 12 (1899): 372-374.

== See also ==
- List of works by Henri Chapu
