= Broadway Plaza (Denver) =

Former shopping mall in Denver, Colorado

- The former Printemps department store, now Quest Diagnostics
- Alternative names: Broadway InterPlaza

General information
- Location: Broadway and Alameda, Denver, Colorado
- Coordinates: 39°42′15″N 104°59′20″W
- Current tenants: Quest Diagnostics
- Opened: 1986

Broadway Plaza, also known as Broadway InterPlaza, located southwest of Broadway and Alameda in the Baker neighborhood of Denver, Colorado, was a retail complex most notable as the only (until 2025) North American location of the French department store Printemps. The store was open for approximately 16 months before failing, and the building is now the Denver laboratory for the medical testing company Quest Diagnostics. The multi-use complex of buildings is now re-purposed under various ownership entities.

== Early days ==
In its earlier days, the land on which the shopping center was built had two incarnations: Beginning in 1922, Merchants Park sports arena, home of the Denver Bears baseball team; and then later Merchants Park Shopping Center, which opened in 1951, with an appearance by Hopalong Cassidy The shopping center had a Walgreen Drugs, Miller's Supermarket, and a Joslin's Department Store, which opened on March 21, 1952. North of Merchants Park was a huge warehouse and retailing operation of Montgomery Ward. The Denver Tramway Company's South Division Car Barn was located at Broadway and Alaska Pl. near the Montgomery Ward's site, and was the scene of some of the violent events of the Denver streetcar strike of 1920.

== Development ==
Broadway Plaza Shopping Center was the idea of Allan S. Reiver, a Denver real estate developer, who had redeveloped a number of historic buildings in downtown Denver. Influenced by the high-flying 1980s, he envisioned Broadway Plaza as a high-end shopping destination, despite it being built in a working class and industrial neighborhood. Reiver's company Realities, Inc. signed a contract to develop Printemps locations around the United States, the first being at Broadway Plaza. Reiver's partner at Broadway Plaza, former Atlantic Richfield Co CEO Robert O. Anderson, played a major part in convincing Printemps to locate in Denver. Land for the giant project was purchased in 1984 with financing from Red Hill Savings, a division of Hill Financial of Red Hill, Pa.

The shopping center was to have three components: Printemps and the International Collection of boutique stores; the Denver Design Center, and an office building renovated from the Montgomery Ward complex. The shopping center opened in late 1986, and by late 1987, numerous smaller stores were closing in the International Collection, despite being offered free rent before the opening of Printemps.

== Printemps ==
Printemps opened November 6, 1987, and saw much traffic for its beginning months. As business slowed, a double-decker bus was put into operation to shuttle shoppers from downtown. The department store closed in April 1989. Before closing, the owners attempted to sell the Denver franchise itself as well as rights for future stores in the United States. Retailing experts saw the failure of the store as being due to the price point of the merchandise and its location; Cherry Creek Shopping Center, which was being rebuilt at that time, might have been a better location for Printemps; this was a common opinion even before Broadway Plaza was built.

== Restructuring ==
In mid-1988, during the decline of Printemps and high vacancies in the project, Reiver lost control of Broadway Plaza and the Printemps store. Hill Financial forced Reiver to sell his interest in the project to a new partnership, Western Equities, which renamed the project Broadway InterPlaza. The investment at Broadway Plaza was one investment that led to the 1980s S&L failure of Hill Financial.

== Today ==
After the department store closed, the space was used for a short period as an event center, before being occupied by Quest Diagnostics. Part of the International Collection was used by the culinary arts program of the Art Institute of Colorado and later by food services and training companies. The Montgomery Ward building was torn down on February 14, 1993, and redevelopment of the site into Broadway Marketplace began with assistance from the Denver Urban Renewal Authority. Broadway Marketplace included a collection of big-box retailers, such as Kmart, Office Max, Sam's Club, and an Albertson's (now Safeway) grocery store. Broadway Marketplace was initially developed by Homart (the real estate development arm of Sears), along with the Denver Urban Renewal Authority (DURA). Kmart closed in March 2017.

== Future ==
In 2009 the Denver City Council approved a General Development Plan for the Denver Design District, by which D4 Urban LLC would create a large transit-oriented development in the original Broadway Plaza area and adjacent properties southwest of Broadway and Alameda Ave. The name "Denver Design District" is already in use for the Denver Design Center portion.

By 2023, three large apartment buildings and a community plaza, Bayer Square, had been built to as part of the redevelopment. The overall project rebranded as Broadway Park. In 2025 the General Development Plan was repealed and replaced by an Infrastructure Master Plan.

== Sculpture ==
A signature sculpture, Articulated Wall by artist Herbert Bayer is located at the complex, bordering highway I-25. The work was dedicated in July 1995, and belongs to the Denver Art Museum. When the development project rebranded as Broadway Park, Bayer's style became a theme. In 2021 Four Chromatic Gates, based on a maquette Bayer had designed, was installed at the Alameda light rail station adjacent to Broadway Park, and in 2023 Forest Sculpture was installed in Bayer Square.

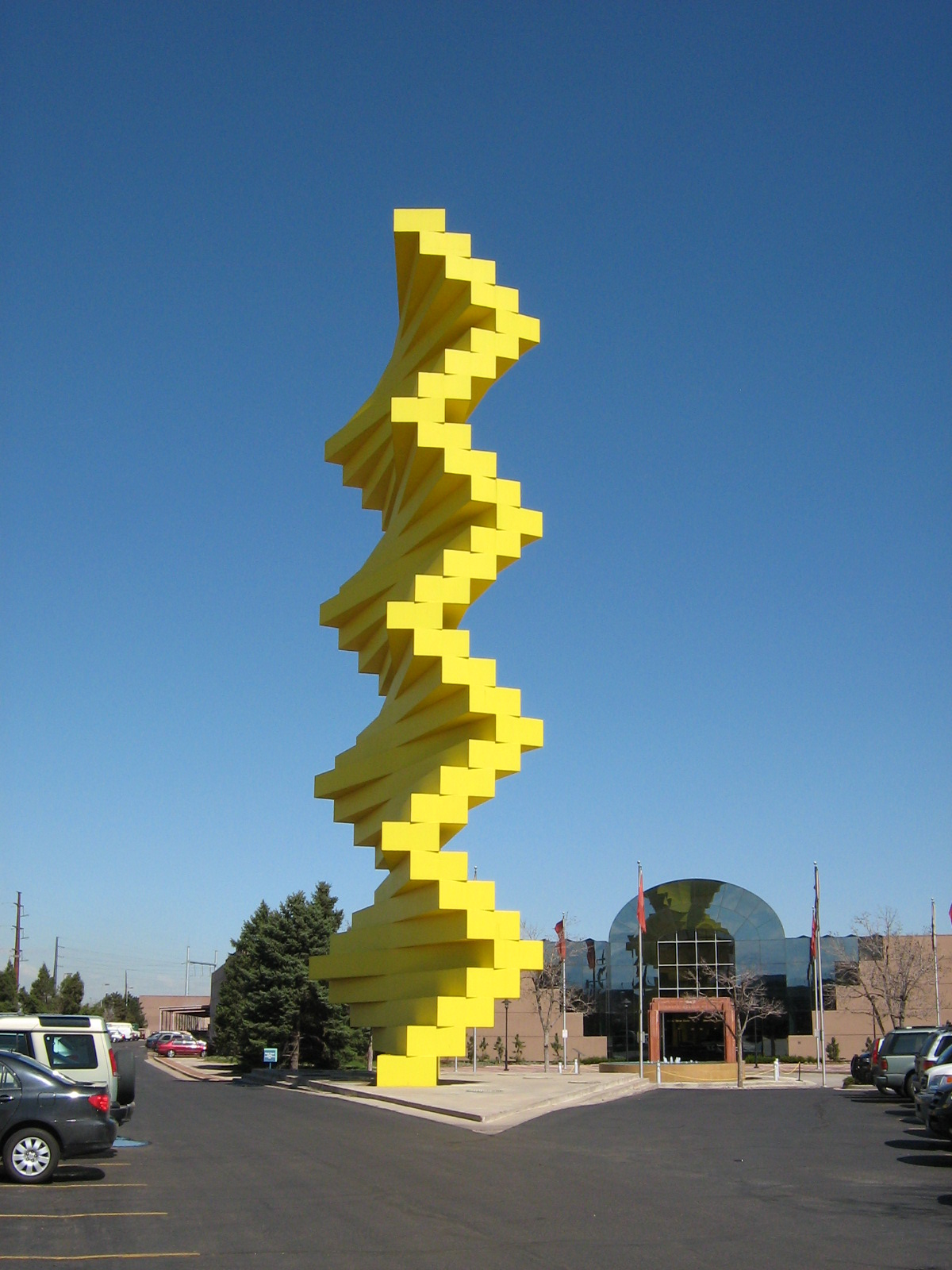
Articulated Wall sculpture. Denver Design Center is beyond it.
