= Grans Magatzems Pyrénées =

Coordinates: 42.543455°N 1.731883°E

The Grans Magatzems Pyrénées (Pyrénées Hyper Centre), also known as Pyrénées Andorra, Pyrénées Department Store or just Pyrénées, is a major department store situated in Andorra la Vella, in Andorra. The company has been a member of the International Association of Department Stores from 1979 to 2019.

On 4 November 2025, prominent promoter of the Grans Magatzems Pyrénées, Jacqueline Pradère, died at the age of 99.
