= Théâtre du Palais-Royal =

Theatre in Paris, France

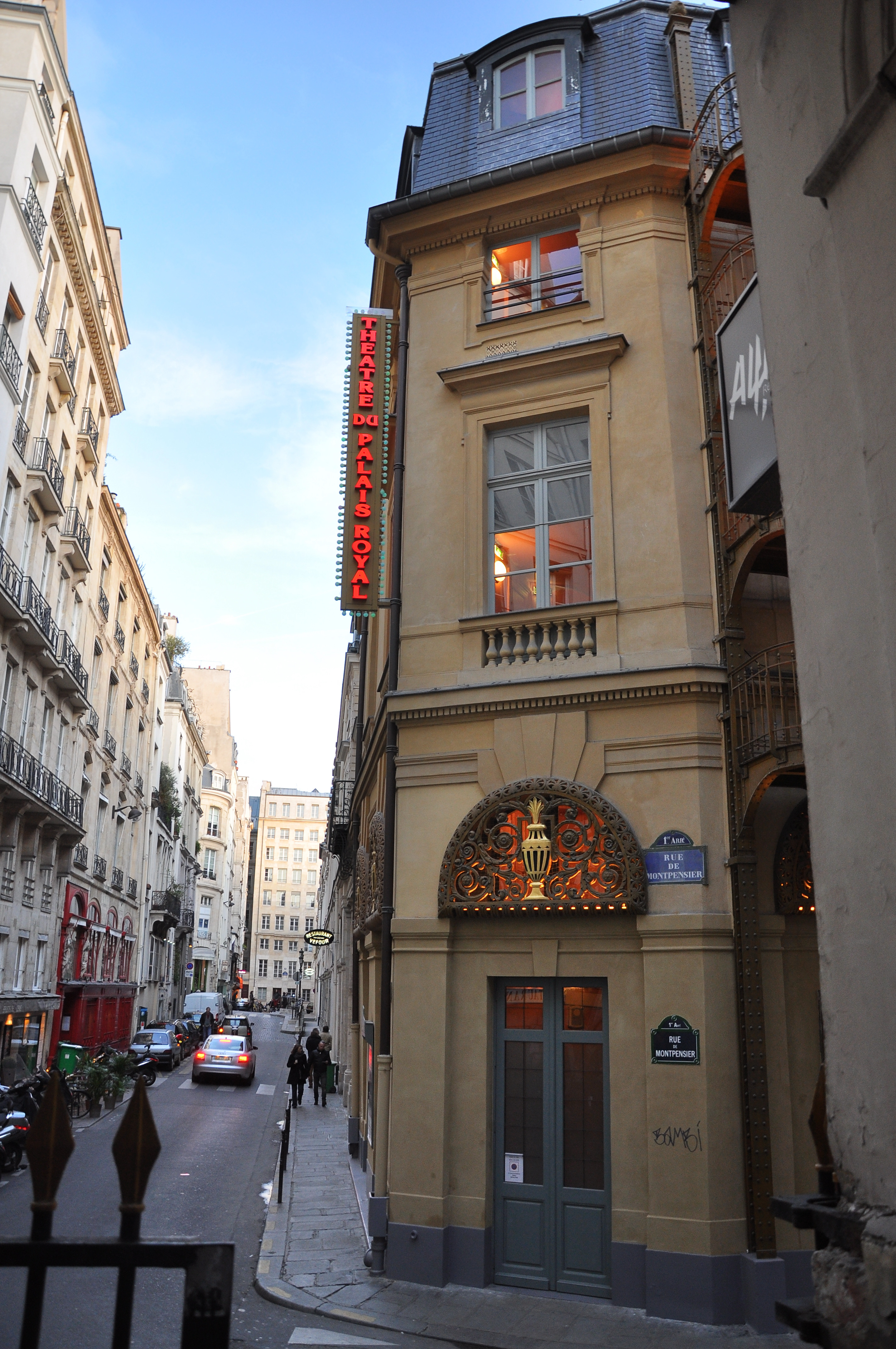
- Facade of the theatre (as seen looking east on the rue de Beaujolais at its intersection with the rue de Montpensier)
- Interactive map of Théâtre du Palais-Royal
- Former names: Théatre des Beaujolais (1784); Théâtre Montansier (1790); Théâtre du Péristyle du Jardin-Égalité (1791 or 1793); Théâtre de la Montagne (1794); Théâtre des Variétés or Variétés-Montansier (1795); Théâtre du Jardin-Égalité (1799); Théâtre du Palais-Égalité (1799); Théâtre Montansier (1800); Théâtre des Variétés (1801–1806); Théâtre des Pupi-Napolitani (1810); Théâtre des Jeux Forains (1810–1812); Théâtre du Palais-Royal (1831); Théâtre de la Montansier (1848); Théâtre du Palais-Royal (1852)
- Address: 38 rue de Montpensier; 1st arrondissement of Paris
- Coordinates: 48.8662°N 2.33764°E
- Capacity: 750
- Public transit: Pyramides

Construction
- Opened: 23 October 1784
- Rebuilt: 1880
- Years active: 1784–1812; 1831–present
- Architects: Victor Louis (1784); Louis Regnier de Guerchy (1830); Paul Sédille (1880)

Website
- www.theatrepalaisroyal.com

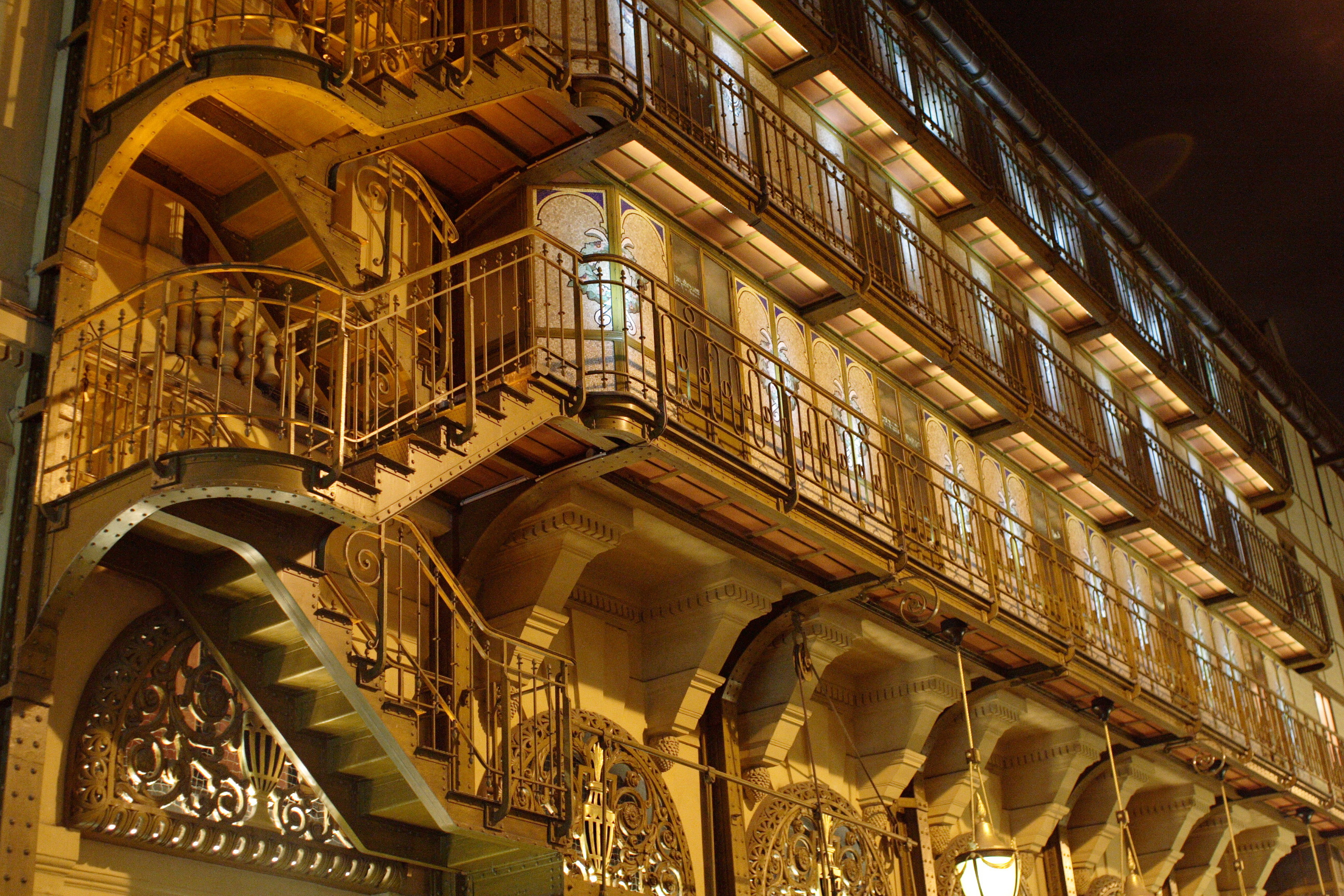
Fire escapes (rue de Montpensier facade)

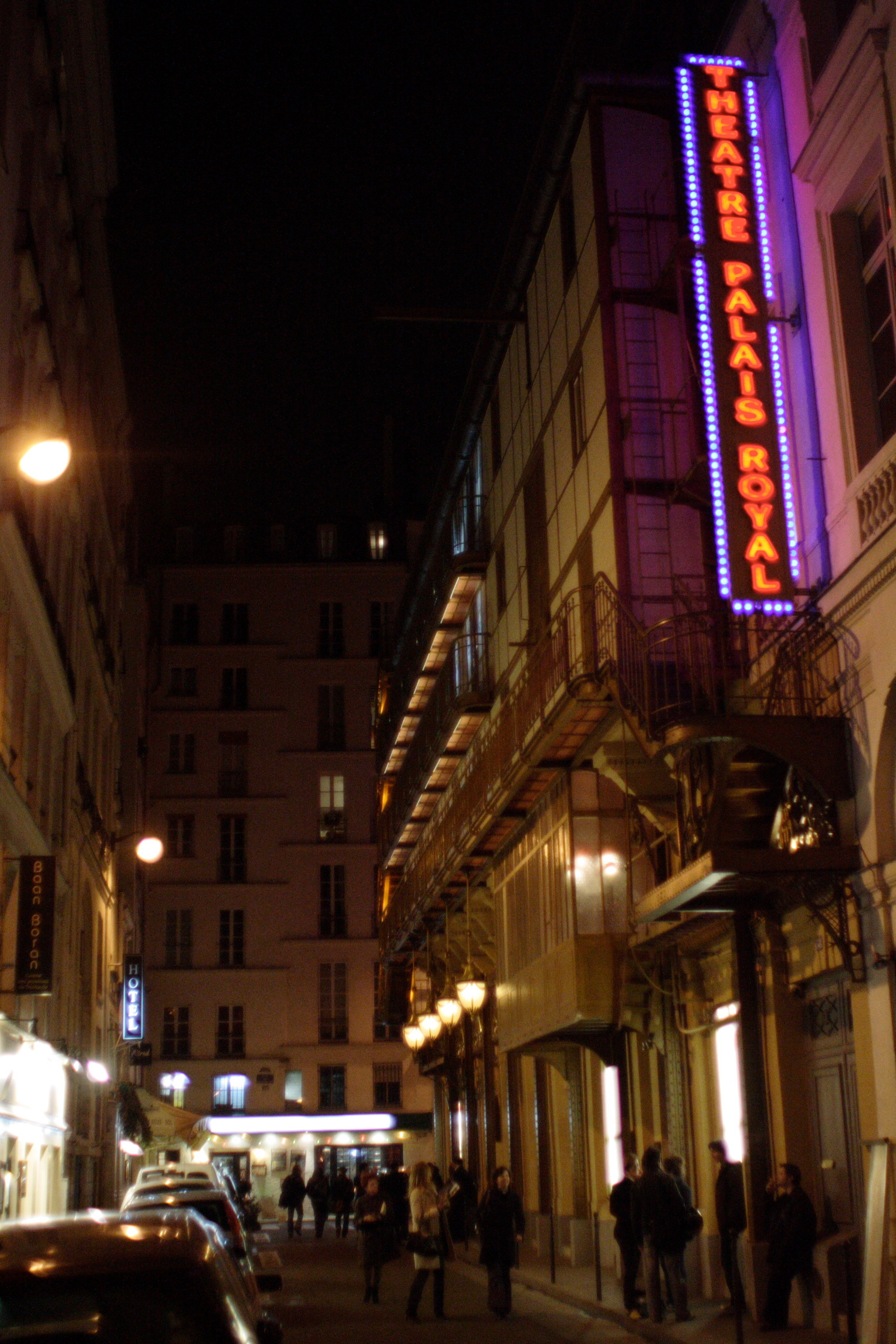
Rue de Montpensier facade, looking north

The Théâtre du Palais-Royal (French pronunciation: [teɑtʁ dy palɛ ʁwajal]) is a 750-seat Parisian theatre at 38 rue de Montpensier, located at the northwest corner of the Palais-Royal in the Galerie de Montpensier at its intersection with the Galerie de Beaujolais.

== Brief history ==
Originally known as the Théâtre des Beaujolais, it was a puppet theatre with a capacity of about 750 that was built in 1784 to the designs of the architect Victor Louis. In 1790 it was taken over by Mademoiselle Montansier and became known as the Théâtre Montansier. She began using it for plays and Italian operas translated into French and the following year hired Louis to enlarge the stage and auditorium, increasing its capacity to 1300. After Napoleon's decree on the theatres in 1807 introduced significant constraints on the types of pieces that could be performed, it was used for lighter fare, such as acrobatics, rope dancing, performing dogs, and Neapolitan puppets. In 1812 the theatre was converted into a café with shows.

After the July Revolution of 1830 some of the restrictions on theatres were relaxed. Dormeuil and Poirson had the theatre remodelled by Louis Regnier de Guerchy and reopened it as the Théâtre du Palais-Royal with a license to present comédies, vaudevilles, and comédies melées d'ariettes, among which were some early works by Hervé. Later he was its chief musical conductor for several years. The theatre became especially well known for presenting the hilarious comedies of Eugène Labiche. The restrictions on genre were lifted in 1864, and the theatre began to present, not only comedies such as the farces of Georges Feydeau, but also more ambitious productions including operettas, the most famous of which was probably Offenbach's La Vie parisienne in 1866. The actresses Hortense Schneider and Virginie Déjazet also appeared there. The unique fire escapes were added in 1880, when the theatre was entirely rebuilt by the architect Paul Sédille.

Gustave Quinson was the theatre's director from 1912 to 1942 and presented comedies by Tristan Bernard and Maurice Hennequin. Performers included the actress Mistinguett and the actor Raimu. In the 1950s the theatre produced Paul Claudel's Le soulier de satin (The Satin Slipper) with Jean-Louis Barrault and Madeleine Renaud. Subsequently, the theatre began reviving boulevard comedies, such as those by Marcel Achard, Feydeau, and Sacha Guitry. Performers included Daniel Auteuil, Jean-Claude Brialy, Jean-Claude Carrière, Pierre Dux, Edwige Feuillère, and Jean Marais. Today the theatre continues to present plays and other light entertainments.

== Théâtre des Beaujolais ==
As early as 1753 a puppet theatre was erected in the northwest corner of the gardens of the Palais-Royal to entertain the children of its owner, the Duke of Orléans. In 1780, desiring to live more privately with his new wife, Madame de Montesson, whom he had secretly married because she was a commoner, he transferred ownership of the palace to his son, Louis Philippe Joseph d'Orléans (at that time the Duke of Chartres). The latter, wishing to add to his income, decided to enclose the gardens north of the palace on three sides with 6-storey apartment buildings having colonnades on the interior garden side for shops, restaurants, and places of entertainment. Realizing that the theatre would likely enhance the value of his property and the rents he could charge by increasing the number of visitors, Chartres decided to enlarge it and make it more permanent. The architect he chose to design the new apartment buildings was Victor Louis, who was famous for having designed the Théâtre de Bordeaux. Construction began in 1781, and the new garden complex was opened to the public in 1784. The new puppet theatre gave its inaugural performance on 23 October and soon became popularly known as the Théâtre des Beaujolais, since this was the name usually given to sons of the House of Orléans before they became adults. More officially it was known as the Théatre des Petits Comédiens de Son Altesse Sérénissime Monseigneur le Comte de Beaujolais, the Count of Beaujolais being the duke's youngest son.

The director of the theatre was Jean-Nicolas Gardeur, and, as puppet plays were falling out of fashion as adult entertainment, he soon realized he would need to modify the nature of his presentations. His license, however, did not allow his actors to speak on stage. To get around these problems, he used a strategy which in part resembled one previously employed by Audinot at Théâtre de l'Ambigu-Comique: he replaced the puppets with children. Gardeur's innovation was having the child actors silently mouth words spoken or sung by adult actors, who quietly moved in felt slippers behind the scene. As an English tourist of 1788 later reported: "So perfect is this deception, that it has given rise to considerable wagers whether the voices did not actually proceed from persons on the stage." The theatre was later taken over by a director named Delomel, but by 1789 attendance had declined, and he was in serious financial difficulties.

== Théâtre Montansier ==
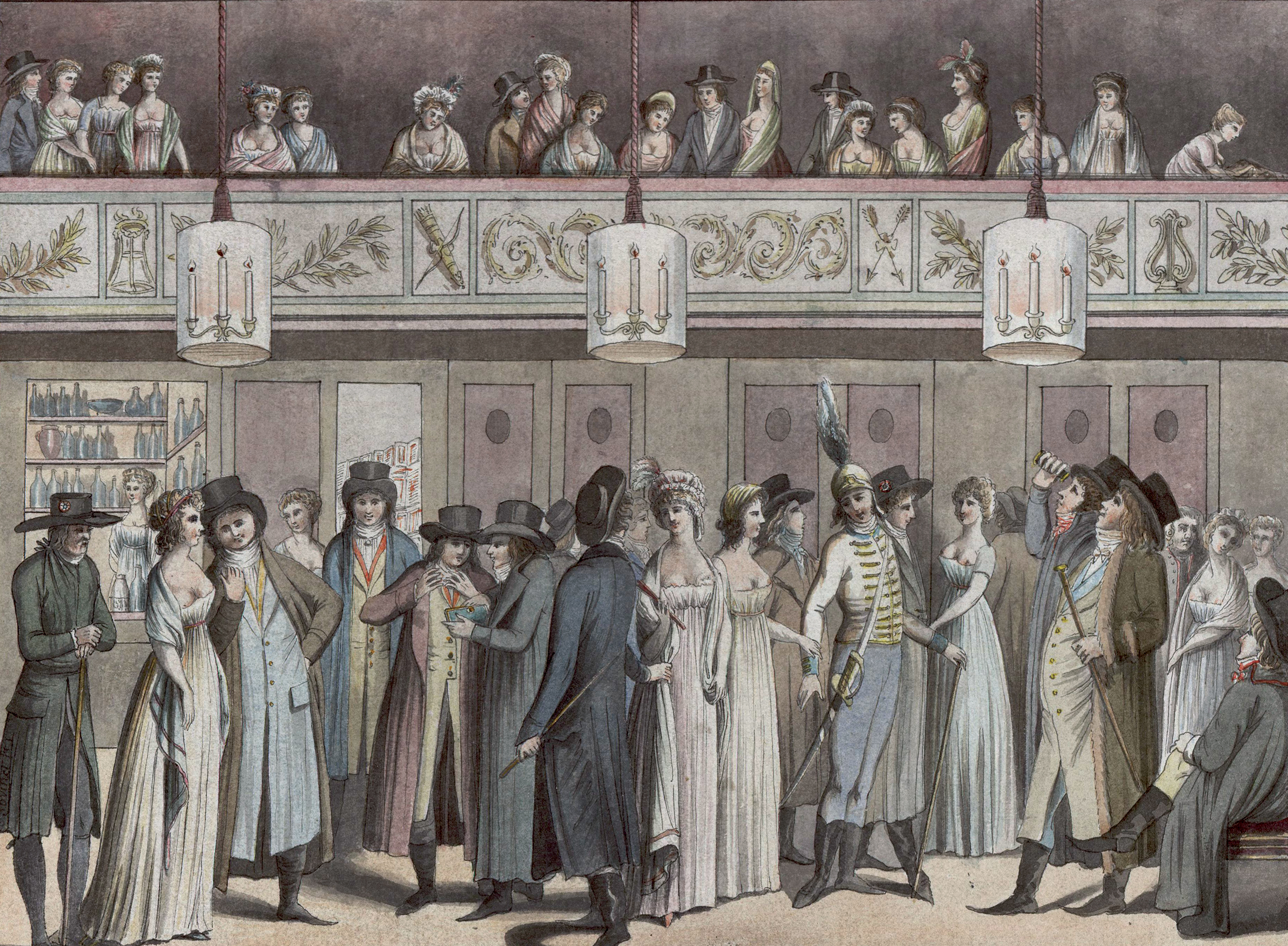
Foyer of the theatre in the 18th century

In October 1789 a revolutionary mob forcibly evicted the royal family from the Palace of Versailles and compelled them to move to Paris. Mademoiselle Montansier, who had been the manager of the theatre at Versailles, as well as several other court theatres, followed the king and queen. Needing a theatre near the court's new location at the Palais des Tuileries, and learning of Delomel's situation, she swiftly used her royal connections to acquire his lease. Delomel was evicted in January 1790, after which he transferred his troupe on 22 February to the Théâtre des Élèves de l'Opéra on the Boulevard du Temple, where eventually for lack of adequate receipts he was forced to close permanently on 7 March 1791. Under the name Théâtre Montansier, the theatre in the Palais-Royal reopened on 12 April 1790 with the three-act comic opera Les Epoux mécontents (Gli sposi malcontenti) with music by Storace and a new libretto by Dubuisson. On 30 September the company presented the play Le Sourd, ou L'Auberge pleine, a 3-act comedy by P. J. B. Desforges. It was a major success becoming the most performed play of the Revolution with over 450 performances, 251 at Montansier's theatre alone, where it eventually earned around 500,000 francs, a substantial amount of money for the time. The theatre began presenting Italian operas in French translation, successfully competing with, and gaining the enmity of the Opéra which had been exiled at the suburban Théâtre de la Porte Saint-Martin since 1781.

Almost immediately ticket sales began to outstrip the capacity of her theatre. The stage and the seating area were so small, that the Almanach des spectacles thought "the theatre too small, the actors too large". During the two-week Easter break of 1791, Montansier hired Victor Louis to enlarge the stage and the auditorium. The capacity of the house was increased to 1300 spectators, and the height and depth of the stage were doubled.

As the Revolution progressed, Montansier was anonymously accused in political pamphlets, called libelles, of debauchery in her relations with her lover and partner Honoré Bourdon de Neuville, and in her previous associations with Marie Antoinette. Later she was accused of concealing weapons intended for counterrevolutionary activities. Montansier attempted to counteract these rumours and accusations, and let it be known her sympathies lay with the new revolutionary government. In 1792 after the French declaration of war on Austria in April and the subsequent revelations of the Brunswick Manifesto in August, Montansier demonstrated her patriotism by outfitting a contingent of soldiers for the defense of France. Later that year when the French invaded the Austrian Netherlands, under the command of General Charles François Dumouriez, Montansier convinced Dumouriez to allow her and her troupe to accompany the army. They may have provided assistance at the Battle of Jemmapes on 6 November 1792 and for certain entertained the troops after setting up a stage on the battlefield. Later, when the French armies arrived in Brussels, Montansier set up a theatre to present patriotic and propagandistic entertainments, including revolutionary plays by Fabre d'Églantine, Joseph Laignelot, and Jean-Marie Collot d'Herbois. These efforts did not completely satisfy her critics, however. When her troupe returned to Paris, she was accused of hiding émigrés in a fictitious third basement in the theatre at the Palais-Royal.

== Directors ==
- 1784–1790: Michel-André Delomel
- 1790–1812: Marguerite Brunet called "Mademoiselle Montansier"
- 1812–1831: Closed
- 1831–1860: Charles Contat-Desfontaines called "Dormeuil"
- 1860–1880: Francis de Plunkett called "Fleury" & Léon Dormeuil
- 1880–1885: Briet & Delcroix
- 1885–1912: Mussay & Boyer
- 1912–1942: Gustave Quinson
- 1942–1954: Jean de Létraz
- 1954–1965: Simone de Létraz
- 1965–1989: Jean-Michel Rouzière
- 1989–1998: Francis Lemonnier, Francis Nani and Christian Azzopardi
- 1998–2013: Francis Nani and Christian Azzopardi
- 2013–present: Francis Nani
