= Henri Chapu =

French sculptor (1833–1891)

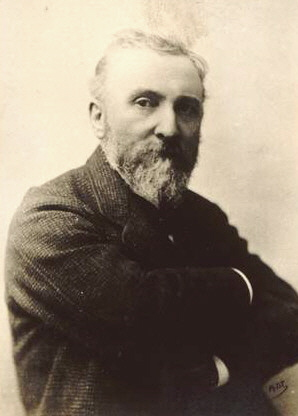
Henri Chapu; photograph by Pierre Petit

Henri-Michel-Antoine Chapu (French pronunciation: [ɑ̃ʁi miʃɛl ɑ̃twan ʃapy]; 29 September 1833 – 21 April 1891) was a French sculptor in a modified Neoclassical tradition who was known for his use of allegory in his work.

== Life and career ==
Born in Le Mée-sur-Seine into modest circumstances, Chapu moved to Paris with his family and in 1847 entered the Petit École with the intention of studying drawing and becoming an interior decorator. There his talents began to be recognized and he was admitted to the École des Beaux-Arts in 1849. In 1850 he began working and studying with a well-known sculptor James Pradier.

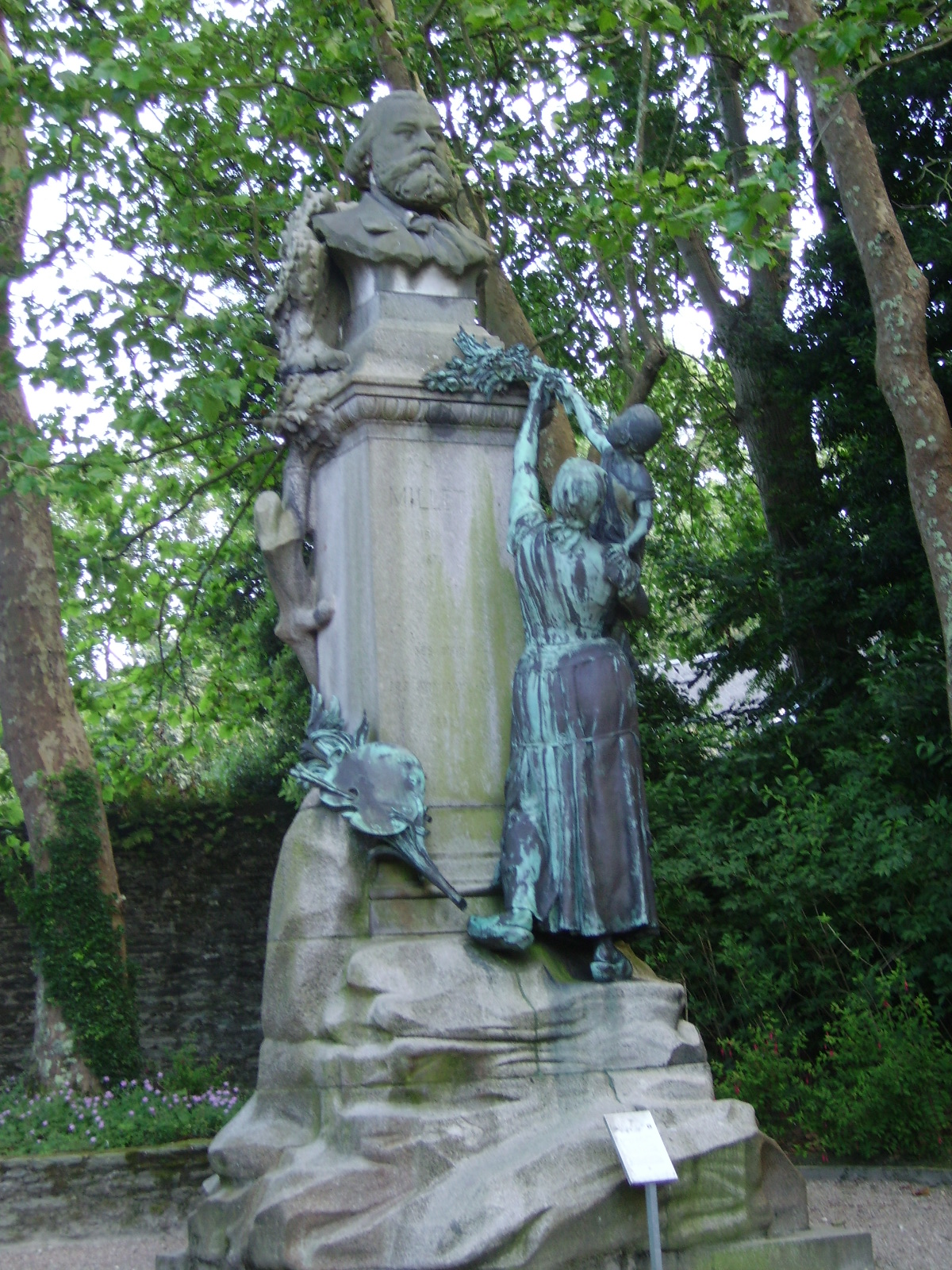
Monument to Jean-François Millet in Cherbourg-en-Cotentin, 1892

Following Pradier's death in 1852 Chapu began studying with another sculptor, Francisque Duret. After coming in second in 1851, he won the Prix de Rome in 1855, then spent five years in Italy.

He first gained widespread attention following the creation of his statues Mercure inventant le caducée (Mercury Invents the Caduceus) in 1861 and Jeanne d'Arc à Domrémy (Joan of Arc at Domrémy) in 1870 (in which she was represented as a peasant girl), and led to many commissions thereafter. He also contributed to the French revival of the medal as an artistic form.

Chapu taught at Paris' Academie Julian. Among his students was American sculptor Cyrus Dallin who studied under him in 1888-1889.

An Officer of the French Legion of Honor, Chapu died in Paris in 1891.

At least four full-scale reproductions of Jeanne d'Arc are on permanent display at universities throughout the U.S. state of Virginia: in McConnell Library at Radford University in Radford; beneath the rotunda of Ruffner Hall at Longwood University in Farmville; in Carrier Library at James Madison University in Harrisonburg; and beneath the rotunda of Ball Hall at the University of Mary Washington in Fredericksburg. These four reproductions, affectionately dubbed "Joannie on the Stoney", were each gifted to their respective universities throughout the 1910s, at which point they were all-women's colleges. While legends claim that the statues were gifts from the French government to the young American nurses during World War I, at least Longwood's statue is known to have been a donation from the student body.

== Notable works ==
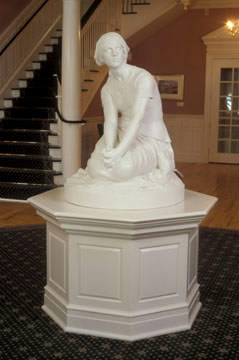
Plaster reproduction of Jeanne d'Arc in Longwood University's Rotunda Hall - Virginia, United States

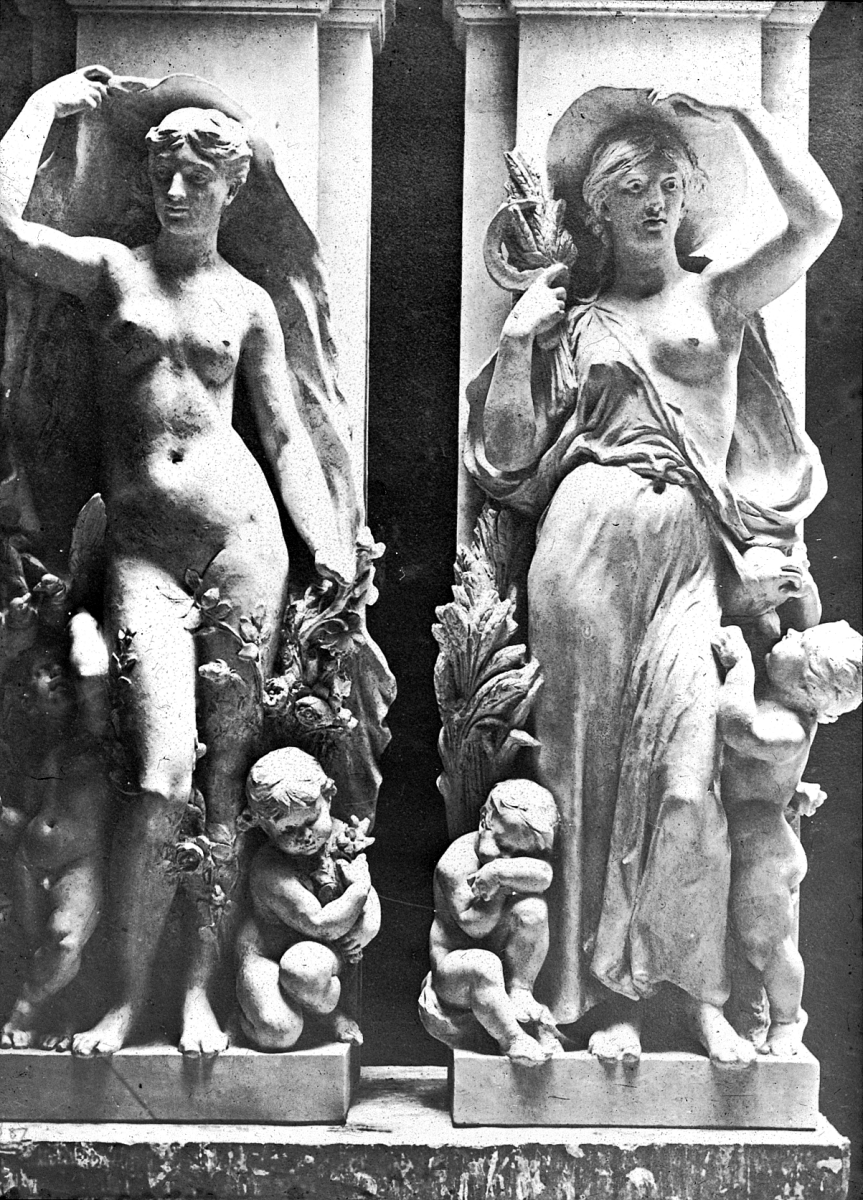
Été (Summer) and Automne (Autumn), part of the Four Seasons installation at Printemps Haussmann

- Mercure inventant le caducée, displayed at the Musée d'Orsay (1861)
- Jeanne d'Arc à Domrémy, also displayed at the Orsay (1870)
- Monument to Henri Regnault, in the courtyard of École des Beaux-Arts, Paris (1872)
- Tomb of Marie d'Agoult, in the Cimetière du Père-Lachaise (1877)
- Les quatre saisons (The Four Seasons), on the western facade of Printemps (1881–89)
- Monument to Gustave Flaubert, in the Musée Flaubert, Rouen (1890) - his last major work.

== See also ==
- List of works by Henri Chapu
