= Boulevard Haussmann =

Boulevard in Paris, France

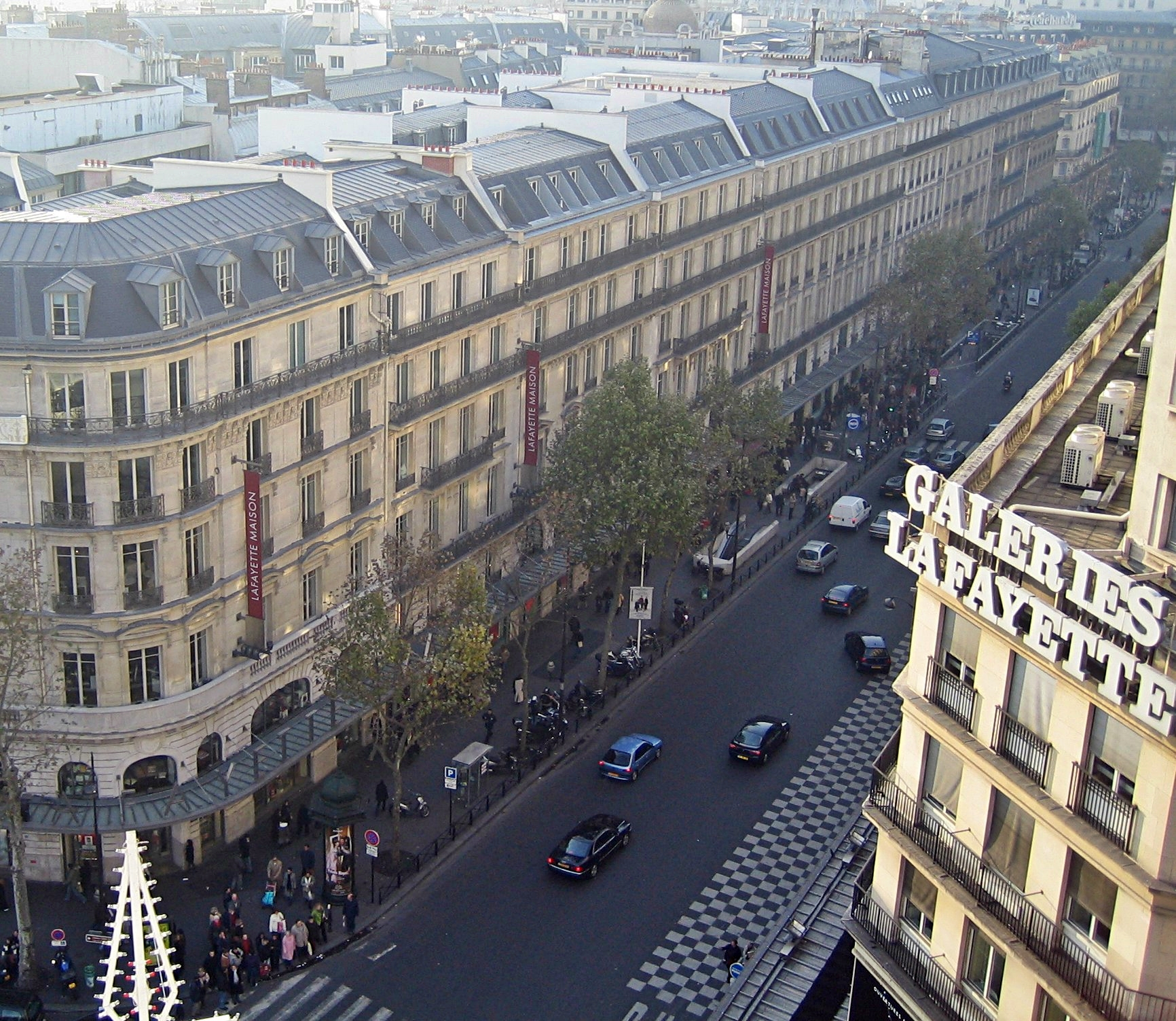
- Boulevard Haussmann from the Galeries Lafayette terrace.

- Location within Paris
- Length: 2,530 m (8,300 ft)
- Width: 30 m (98 ft) from Rue Drouot and Boulevard des Italiens to Rue de Miromesnil; 33.6 m (110 ft) elsewhere.
- Arrondissement: 8th, 9th
- Quarter: Madeleine. Europe. Faubourg du Roule. Faubourg Montmartre. Chaussée d'Antin.
- Coordinates: 48°52′30″N 2°18′26″E
- From: 1 Rue Drouot and 2 Boulevard des Italiens
- To: 202 Rue du Faubourg Saint-Honoré

Construction
- Construction start: October 17, 1857
- Completion: January 22, 1922
- Denomination: March 2, 1864

The Boulevard Haussmann (French pronunciation: [bulvaʁ osman]), 2.53-kilometre (1.57 mi) long from the 8th to the 9th arrondissement, is one of the wide tree-lined boulevards created in Paris by Napoleon III, under the direction of his Prefect of the Seine, Baron Haussmann.

The Boulevard Haussmann is mostly lined with apartment blocks, whose regulated cornice height gives a pleasing eyeline to the Boulevard. The department stores Galeries Lafayette and Au Printemps are sited on this street.

== Location and access ==
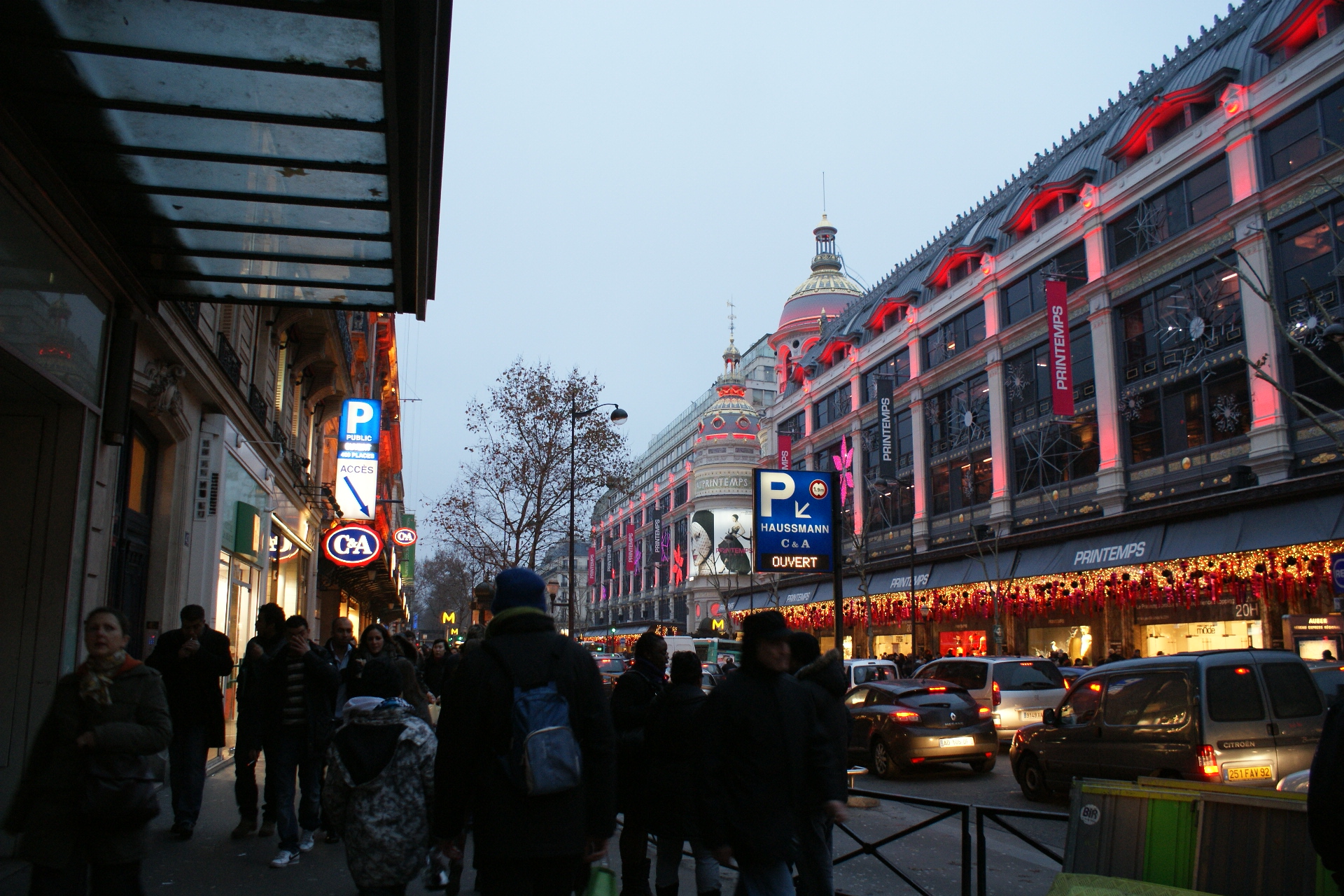
Boulevard Haussmann during Christmas period

2,530 m long, the Boulevard Haussmann crosses the districts of Madeleine, Quartier de l'Europe, Faubourg-du-Roule, Faubourg-Montmartre and Chaussée-d'Antin located in the 9th and 8th arrondissements of Paris and connects, to the east, the crossroads of Boulevard des Italiens and Boulevard Montmartre, where the metro station is located. Richelieu-Drouot, at Avenue de Friedland, extends it to the west.

This road starts from the district of the main bank headquarters, passes department stores with which its name is often associated today, then crosses districts with mostly offices, but still opulent. It was built by a workforce made up largely of masons from the Creuse.

== Origin of the name ==
This road is named after Baron Georges Eugène Haussmann (1809-1891), a French administrator and politician who led the transformations of Paris under the Second Empire as prefect of the Seine.

== History ==
As part of the transformation of Paris, the prefect Haussmann conceived this main traffic axis as a diagonal road linking the first circle of the Grands Boulevards to that of the Wall of the Ferme générale. To do this, he ordered the destruction of the house in which he was born, at the corner of the Rue du Faubourg-Saint-Honoré.

Like his predecessor Rambuteau, Haussmann's activity was rewarded during his lifetime by the attribution of his name to one of the main roads he had ordered to be constructed. However, the boulevard was not completed until well after his death. It was only in 1926 that the Boulevard Haussmann, after twenty years of work, finally joined the Boulevard des Italiens, destroying the Passage de l'Opéra where two years earlier strolled a character of Louis Aragon in the book Le Paysan de Paris.

== Famous inhabitants ==
From 1906 to 1919, the novelist Marcel Proust (1871–1922) lived at No. 102. There, in his cork-lined bedroom (now on display in the Carnavalet Museum), he wrote a major part of À la recherche du temps perdu. Alan Bates starred in 102 Boulevard Haussmann, a 1990 play written by Alan Bennett.

Number 69 was the head office of Compagnie Internationale des Wagons-Lits until 1988

At no. 158 there is the Musée Jacquemart-André.

The Impressionist and patron of other artists Gustave Caillebotte (1848–1894) painted the Boulevard in many different lights as the days and seasons changed.

Marks & Spencer, the British department store chain, opened a store on Boulevard Haussmann in 1975 when it opened its first store in continental Europe.

In the Ian Fleming novel Thunderball, it is described as "the solidest street in Paris" and the site of the headquarters of SPECTRE.

The headquarters of the Arab League was in the Boulevard in the late 1970s, and the representative of the Palestine Liberation Organization Ezzedine Kalak was assassinated there on 3 August 1978.
