= Mademoiselle Montansier =

French actress and theatre director

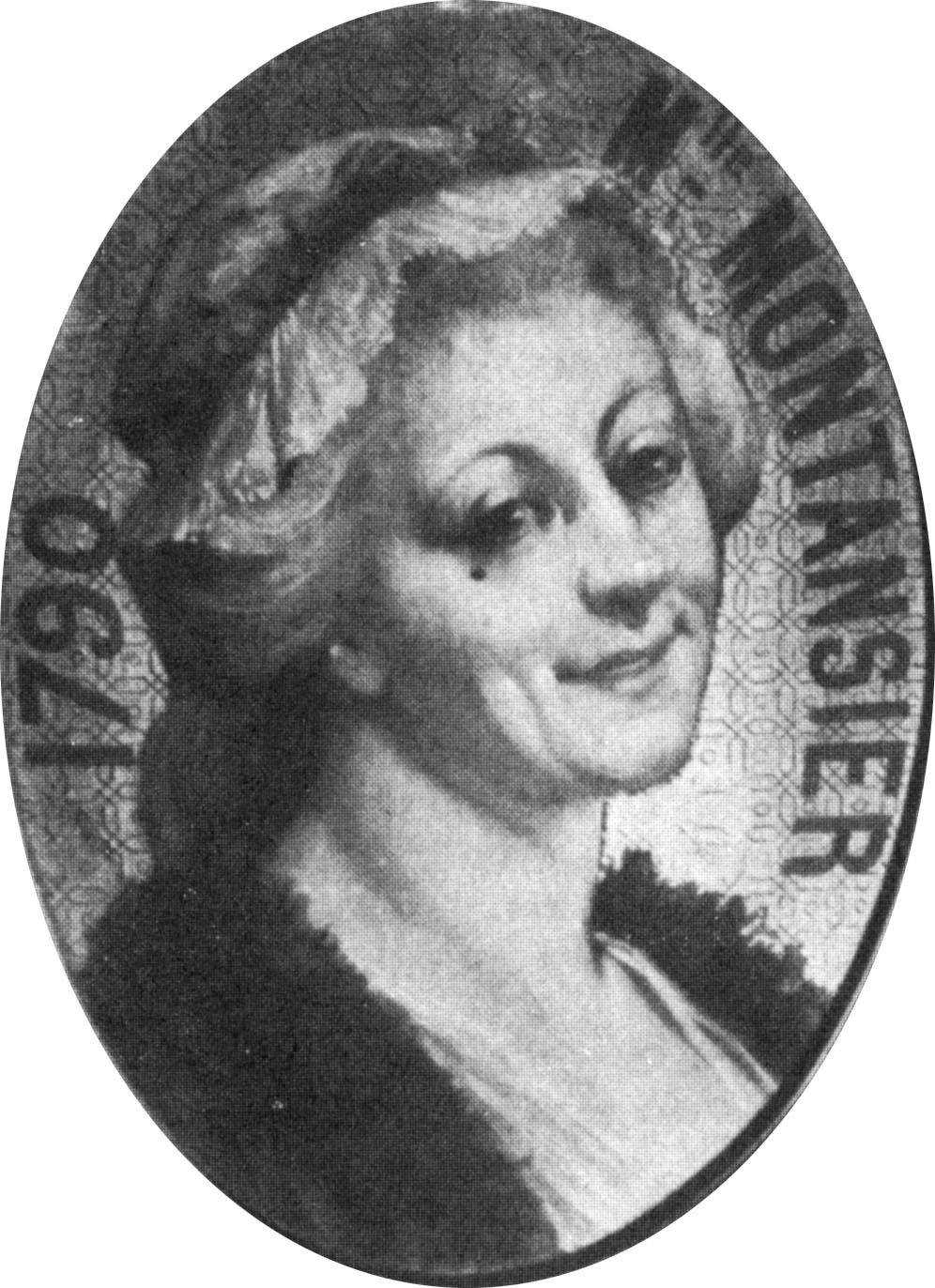
Mlle Montansier (1790)

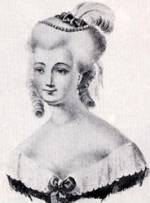
Marguerite Montansier

Marguerite Brunet (French pronunciation: [maʁɡəʁit bʁynɛ]), known by her stage name of Mademoiselle Montansier ([madmwazɛl mɔ̃tɑ̃sje]; 19 December 1730, in Bayonne – 13 July 1820, in Paris), was a French actress and theatre director.

== Background ==
At 14 she fled from the Ursuline convent in Bordeaux, she was there engaged by an acting troupe and — in love with a handsome young actor — embarked for America. She then became the mistress of Burson, Intendant of Martinique, establishing her own dress shop in Saint-Domingue. On her return to Paris, she installed herself in the house of an aunt by marriage, Mme Montansier, a dress-seller from whom she took her stage name. She opened a gaming house on the rue Saint-Honoré, frequented by the gilded youth of Paris and allowing her to enter high society.

== Royal theatre director ==
Having obtained through her liaison with the marquis de Saint-Contest the leadership of a small theatre on rue Satory in Versailles, she turned her attention to queen Marie-Antoinette and through her in 1775 gained the exclusive rights to balls and shows at the Palace of Versailles, followed in 1779 by rights over the theatres in Fontainebleau, Saint-Cloud, Marly, Compiègne, Rouen, Caen, Orléans, Nantes and Le Havre. Backed by such supporters, she built her first theatre at Versailles - at first called "Théâtre de la rue des Réservoirs", but soon renamed "Théâtre Montansier" - which she opened on 18 November 1777 in the presence of Louis XVI and his queen.

Profiting from the French Revolution, she set herself up in Paris in the company of her lover, Honoré Bourdon (stage name "de Neuville"), and took possession of the Théâtre des Beaujolais under the arcades of the Palais-Royal. After major restoration works, she re-opened it on 12 April 1790 with Les Epoux Mécontents, a four-act opera by Dubuisson and Storace. Renamed "Théâtre Montansier", then "Théâtre du Péristyle du Jardin Egalité", then "Théâtre de la Montagne", then "Variétés-Montansier" and finally simply "Variétés", she led it until 1806. Still holding the rights from the former court at the Tuileries, she successfully put on Italian operas in French translations, attracting the envy of the Académie Royale de Musique, exiled to the Porte Saint-Martin.

== Comédiens de la République française ==
She and 85 artistes and employees of her theatre followed the armies of Charles François Dumouriez into the Austrian Netherlands, helping at the battle of Jemmapes and then taking over the leadership of the troop at the Théâtre de la Monnaie in Brussels in January 1793 (renaming that company "Comédiens de la République française"). Returning to Paris in March on the withdrawal of French troops and restoration of the Austrian government, she built "Théatre-National" on rue de la Loi, opening it on 15 August. Demolished after 1820, its site is now the square Louvois.

Imprisoned by the Terror on 25 Brumaire (15 November) on the pretext of having received funds from the English and from Marie-Antoinette or having wanted to set fire to the neighbouring Bibliothèque Nationale, the troupe of "chanteurs-comédiens" which she had created were merged into that of the "Théâtre-Français" on Faubourg Saint-Germain, with their former building passing into the control of the Paris Opéra (it would be destroyed in 1820 in reprisals for the assassination of the duc de Berry). Declared innocent, she was freed ten months later and received large sums of money as compensation.

== Later life ==
She married de Neuville on 5 September 1799 and then in 1801 set up a new troupe of Italian singers known as "Opéra-Buffa" (quickly nicknamed "Italiens"), at Théâtre Olympique on rue de la Victoire. Nevertheless, the regime change at this time was not favourable to her - the troupe was transferred to the salle Favart in 1802, then placed under the direction of Louis-Benoît Picard in 1804, and in 1803 - when Montansier was in prison several weeks for debt - de Neuville died.

Forced to leave the Palais-Royal by decree in 1806 (the neighbouring Comédiens-Français finding that she kept them in the shade) but still infatigable, she convinced Napoleon to authorise her to build a new theatre on the boulevard Montmartre, despite a decree limiting the number of theatres in Paris to just 8.

She transferred her Variétés there and on 24 June 1807, the Tout-Paris assisted in the first production of the Panorama de Momus, a vaudeville by Marc-Antoine Désaugiers. She delegated the success - and the criticism - that this brought to the actor Mira Brunet and died peacefully on 13 July 1820 at 90 years old.

== Legacy ==
A four-act comedy entitled La Montansier, with prologue, was put on in tribute to her in 1904 at the Théâtre de la Gaîté, written by Robert de Flers and Gaston Arman de Caillavet and directed by Réjane.

== Bibliography ==
- Patricia Bouchenot-Déchin, La Montansier, Perrin, 2007 (ISBN 978-2262026813)
