= Montpellier tramway =

Tramway system serving Montpellier

Coordinates: 43.60498°N 3.88051°E

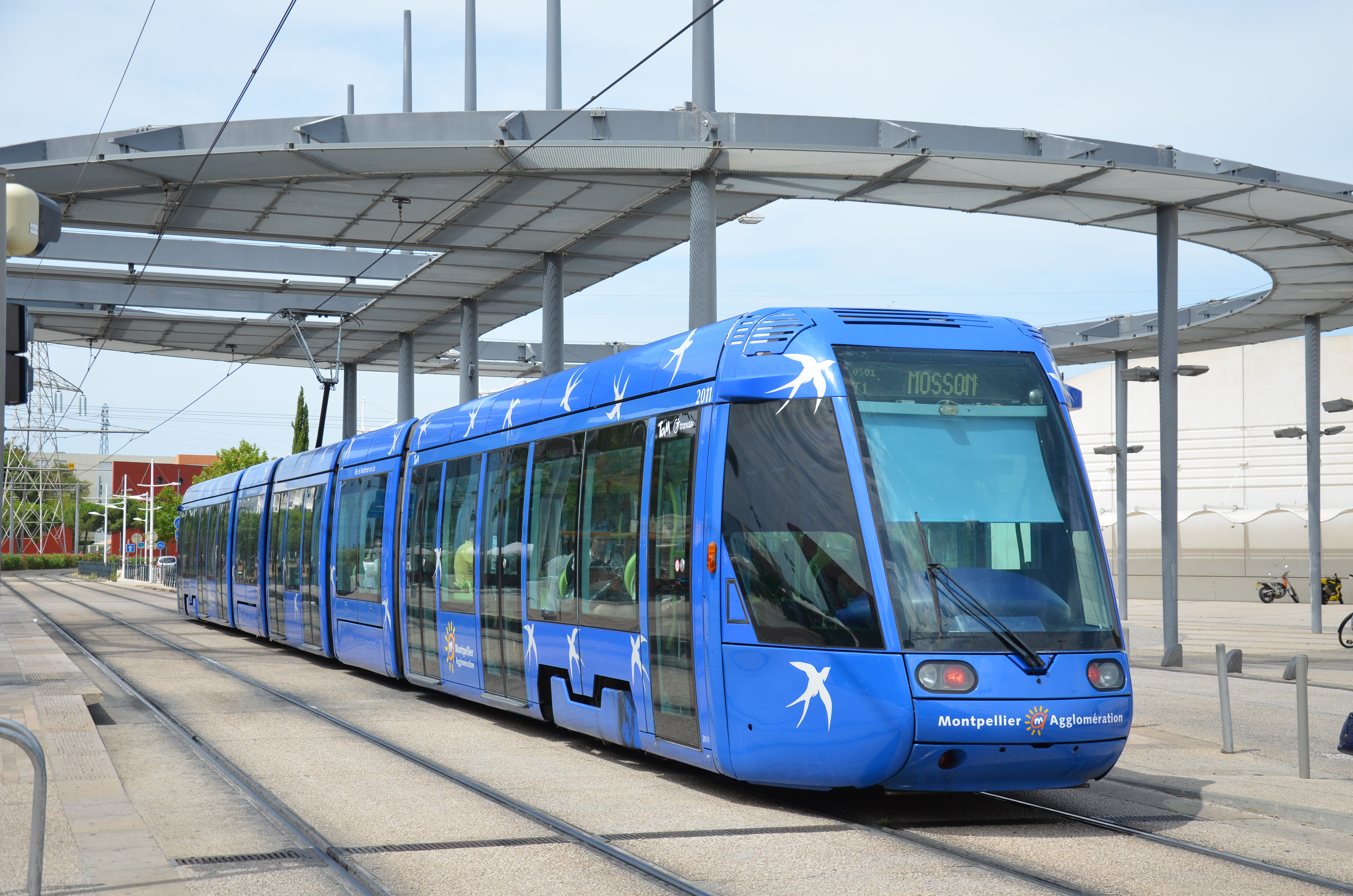
- Alstom Citadis 401 of Line 1

Overview
- Native name: Tramway de Montpellier
- Locale: Montpellier, Occitanie, France
- Transit type: Tram
- Number of lines: 5
- Number of stations: 84
- Daily ridership: 282,000 (2012)
- Annual ridership: 66.32 million (2018)

Operation
- Began operation: 1 July 2000
- Operator: TAM

Technical
- System length: 60.5 km (37.6 mi)
- Track gauge: 1,435 mm (4 ft 8 1/2 in) standard gauge
- Electrification: 750 V DC overhead catenary
System map
Map of Montpellier tramway.

The Montpellier tramway (French: Tramway de Montpellier) is a five-line tramway system in the city of Montpellier in Occitanie, France. The tramway is owned by the Montpellier Méditerranée Métropole, and is operated by the Transports de l'agglomération de Montpellier (TAM) authority.

Following the closure of the original tramway in 1949, the network was planned and commissioned starting in the 1990s. The first line opened in July 2000, followed by the second in December 2006. Lines 3 and 4 simultaneously began operations in April 2012, along with an extension of line 1 and a diversion of line 2. The western section of Line 4 opened in July 2016, thus completing the loop it makes around the city. In total, the four lines constitute 60.5 kilometres (37.6 mi) of track.

The development of the network continues, with extension of Line 1 to the Montpellier Sud de France TGV station and the construction of a fifth tram line linking the northwest of the metropolis to its southwest, both completed in 2025. Other future projects such as the extension of Line 3 to Montpellier–Méditerranée Airport and the Mediterranean seashore were considered.

== History ==
Starting on July 18, 1880 until 1883, the Compagnie Générale des Omnibus de Marseille established horse-drawn tram lines to serve the city of Montpellier. At that time, the city had about 55,000 inhabitants. With 39 horses and 20 carriages, a network of six lines served the medieval centre of Écusson and its surroundings, as well as Castelnau-le-Lez. Depending on the route, they ran every 30 minutes or every hour. This local transport network was eventually abandoned because of poor maintenance of the tracks and poor care of the horses.

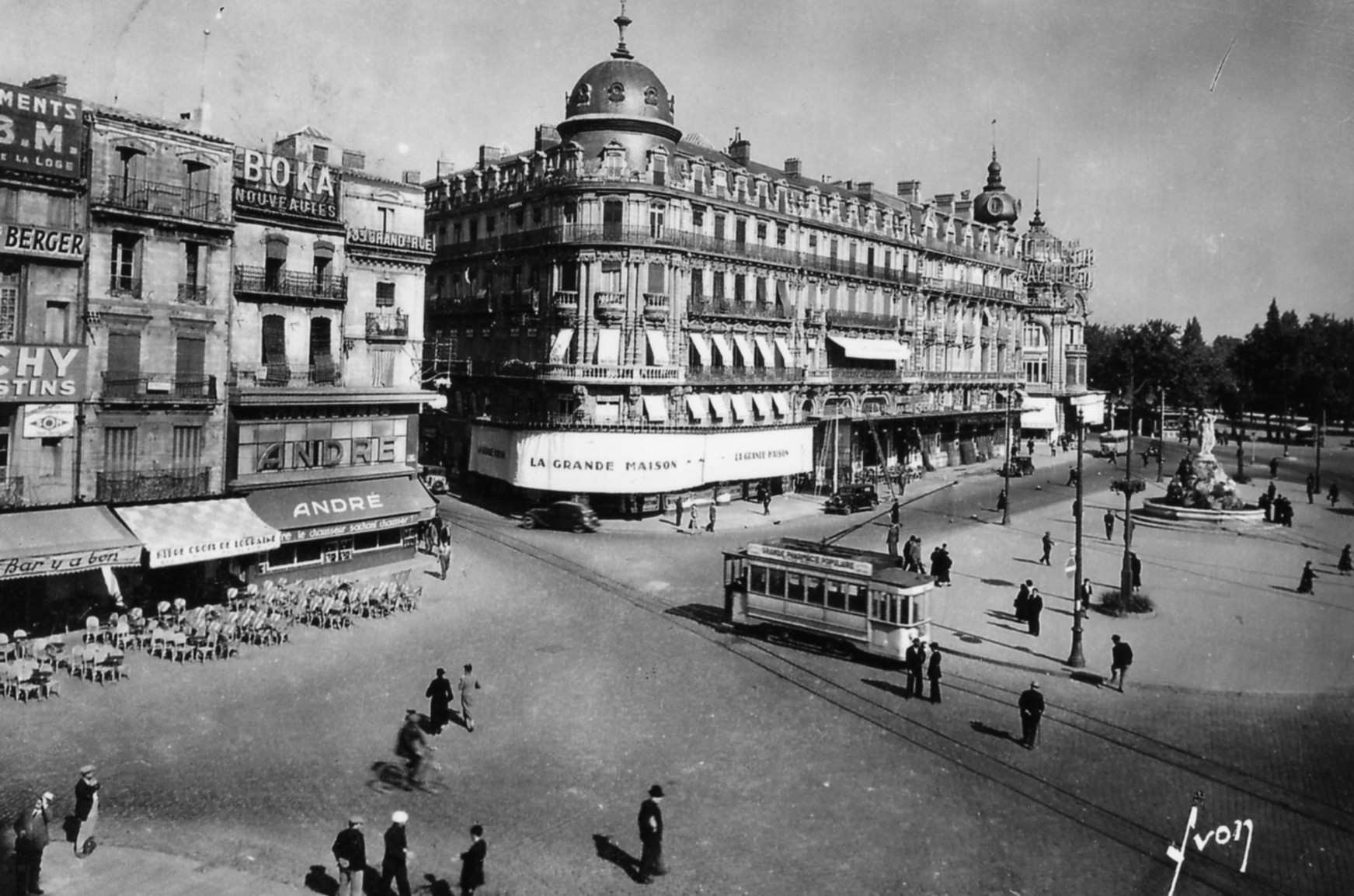
Electric tram crossing Place de la Comédie, around 1947

Later, an electric tram network was created. The first meter-gauge tram lines went into operation in November 1897, and more followed in early 1898. They opened up the area of Montpellier and again the neighboring municipality of Castelnau-le-Lez with frequencies of every 7.5 to 15 minutes. The Place de la Comédie was the main junction of five tram lines. Other transfer points were the Gare Saint Roch train station and the square in front of the Saint-Denis church. The net length was 12 kilometres (7.5 mi). Due to emerging competition from the automobile and in particular because of the creation of a bus network, the Montpellier tramway was shut down on January 31, 1949.

After expressing its interest in the experimental ARAMIS project (which later contributed to the development of the Meteor and VAL transportation projects) during the 1980s, the administration of mayor Georges Frêche proposed the re-creation of a network of three tram lines in the district of Montpellier. The debates then focused on the choice of rolling stock and the route of the first line. One of the main members of the right-wing opposition to the municipal council of Montpellier, Bruno Barthez, militated in favor of a tram on tires, following the example of the guided bus project of Caen. One of the arguments was the lower cost of construction of the line, compared to the tramway on rails.

== Line 1 ==
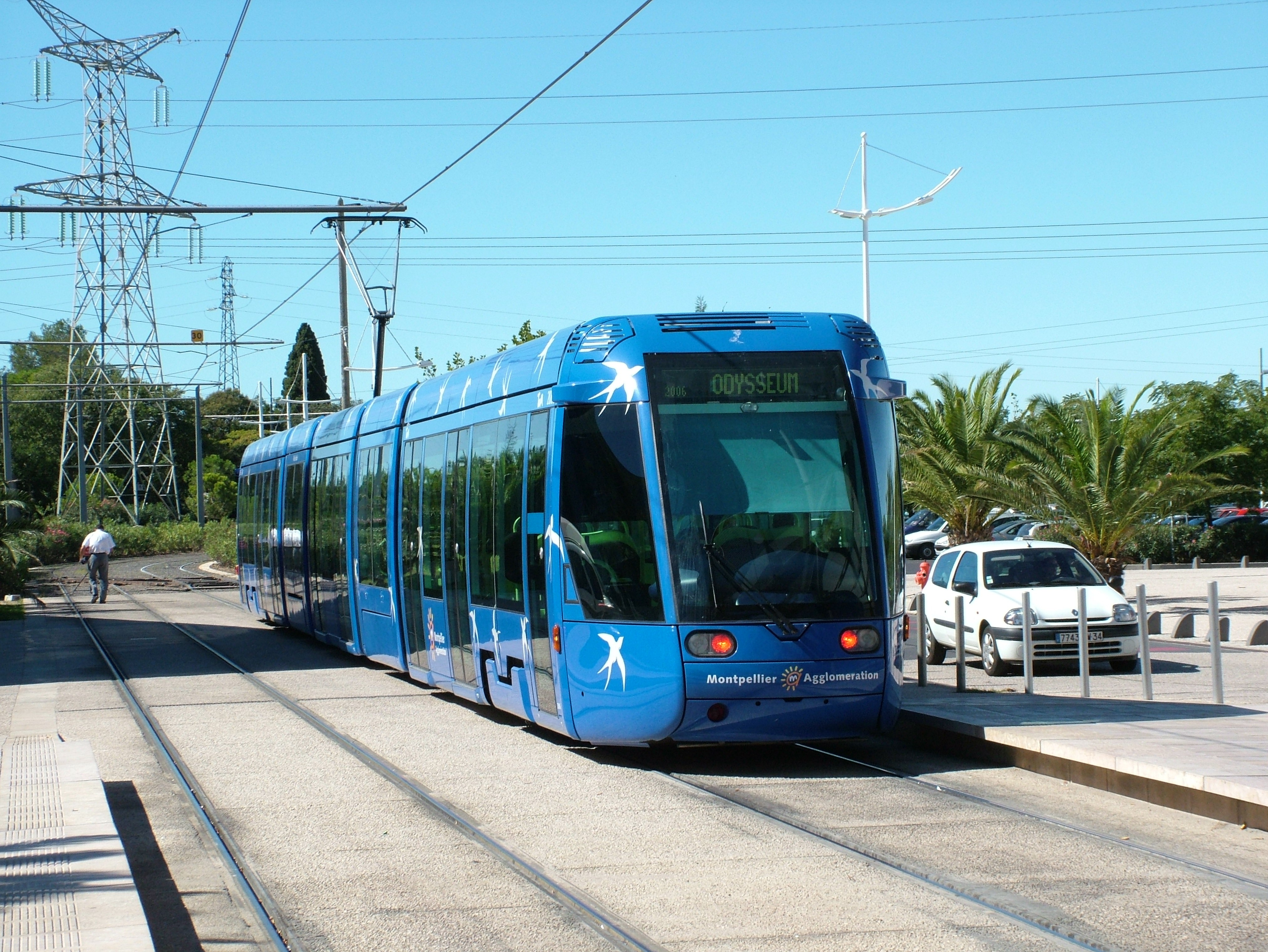
An Alstom Citadis 401 tram on line 1 at Odysseum

Line 1 is 16.7 km (10.4 mi) long and runs entirely within the city limits of Montpellier, going on a looping route from the northwest, through the city centre, and continuing to the east end of the city, terminating at Gare Sud de France, a new train station on the LGV Montpellier–Perpignan high-speed train line. There are 31 stations on the line, with 7 major interchanges., ridership on the line averages 130,000 passengers per day, exceeding initial ridership projections of 75,000 passengers per day. It has the highest ridership of all French tram lines outside of the Parisian region. The line was completed on a budget of €348.8 million. It is coloured blue on the official maps of the system.

Line 1 opened on 1 July 2000. The Millénaire station opened on 11 October 2003, and the Malbosc station opened on 18 November 2003. A one-station extension opened on 21 September 2009 from the former Odysseum station, which was renamed Place de France, to a new Odysseum station which serves an additional shopping centre. On 7 April 2012, the west end of the line was extended from Stade de la Mosson to Mosson to connect with the newly opened Line 3. On 18 October 2025, the east end of the line was extended from Odysseum to Gare Sud de France to connect the new high-speed train station with the tram system.

The design for the line, stations, station platforms, and urban improvements were done by architect Antoine Garcia-Diaz. The livery of trams on Line 1 was decorated in blue with white swallows by stylists Élisabeth Garouste and Mattia Bonetti. Each tram is named after a community member of the Montpellier agglomeration community.

=== Rolling stock ===
All rolling stock on line 1 is stored at the Les Hirondelles depot in the western district of La Paillade, which is located between the Saint-Paul station and the Hauts de Massane station. The rolling stock comprises 30 Alstom Citadis 401 trams and 3 Citadis 402 trams.

Originally, Line 1 was operated with 28 3-section Citadis 301 trams with a length of 29.8 m (97 ft 9 in). As ridership became successful on the line and trams had been filling up, between July 2002 and May 2003, the trams were extended from a length of 29.8 m (97 ft 9 in) and 3 sections to 40.9 m (134 ft 2 in) and 5 sections, and two additional Citadis 401 trams were delivered in January 2002, bringing the number of trams on Line 1 up to 30. The trams are numbered from 2001 to 2030.

In early 2007, three Citadis 302 trams, as used on Line 2, were delivered, and became operational for service on 2 May 2007. The three trams are numbered from 2031 to 2033. All trams on Line 1 have a width of 2.65 m (8 ft 8 in).

=== Stations ===
- Mosson
- Stade de la Mosson
- Halles de La Paillade
- Saint-Paul
- Hauts de Massane
- Euromédecine
- Malbosc - Domaine d'Ô
- Château d'Ô
- Occitanie (interchange with bus routes to northern communities in the Agglomeration)
- Hôpital Lapeyronie
- Universités des Sciences et des Lettres
- Saint-Éloi
- Boutonnet - Cité des Arts
- Stade Philippidès
- Place Albert 1er - Saint Charles (interchange with Line 4 in the Albert 1er - Cathédrale station)
- Louis Blanc - Agora de la Danse (interchange with Line 4)

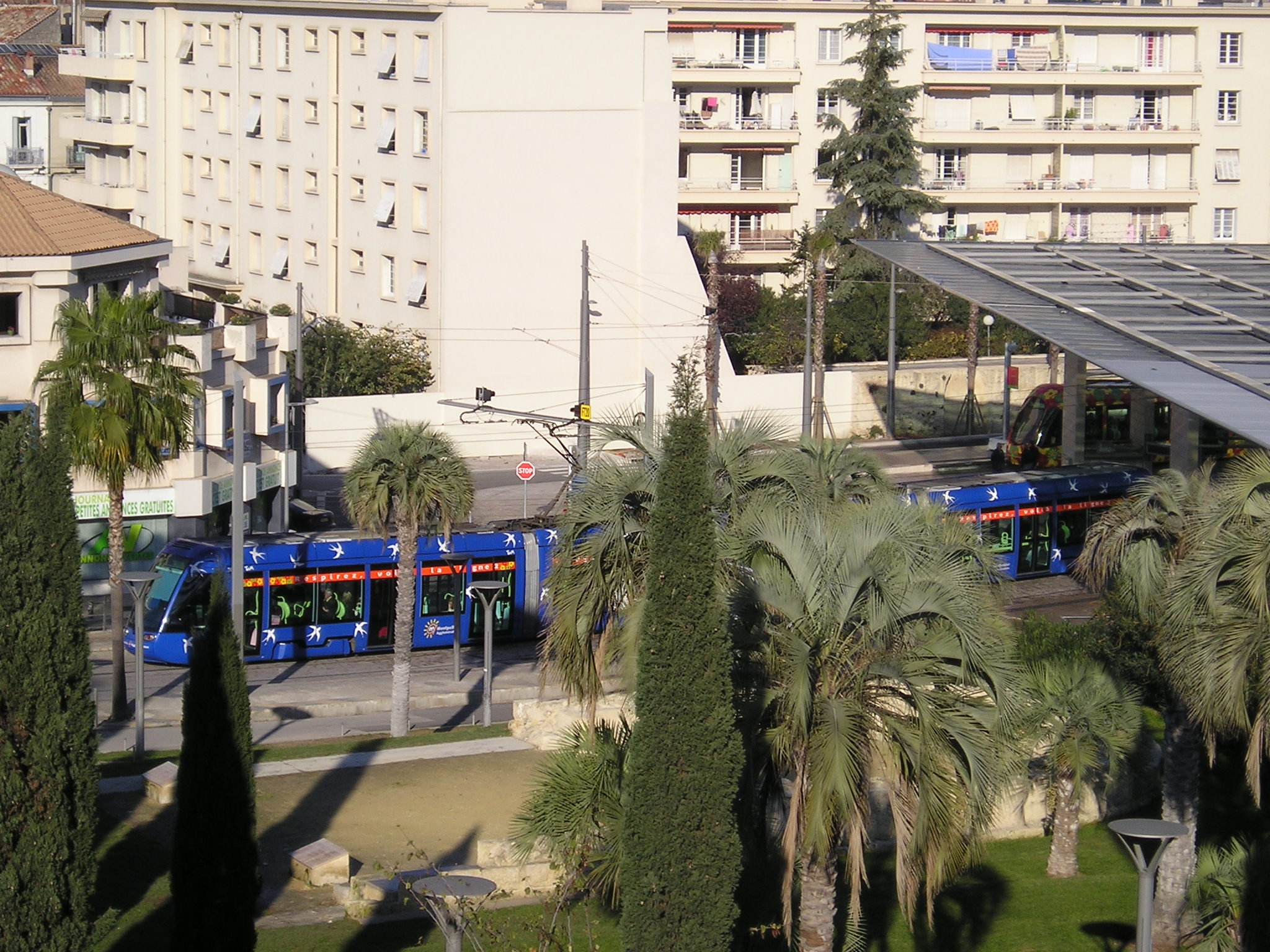
Trams from Line 1 and Line 2 meeting at Corum.

- Corum (interchange with Line 2, Line 4 and bus routes to northeastern communities in the Agglomeration)
- Comédie (interchange with Line 2)
- Gare Saint-Roch (interchange with Line 2, Line 3 and Line 4, bus routes, Airport Bus and SNCF trains)
- Du Guesclin
- Antigone
- Léon Blum
- Place de l'Europe (interchange with Line 4, bus routes to the eastern communities in the Agglomeration and the Airport, and the 1st line of BRT)
- Rives du Lez (interchange with Line 4)
- Moularès - Hôtel de Ville
- Port Marianne (interchange with bus routes to southern communities in the Agglomeration and Line 3)
- Mondial 98
- Millénaire
- Place de France (formerly Odysseum) (interchange with bus routes to eastern communities in the Agglomeration, and to the nearby Pays de l'Or agglomeration)
- Odysseum
- Gare Sud de France

== Line 2 ==
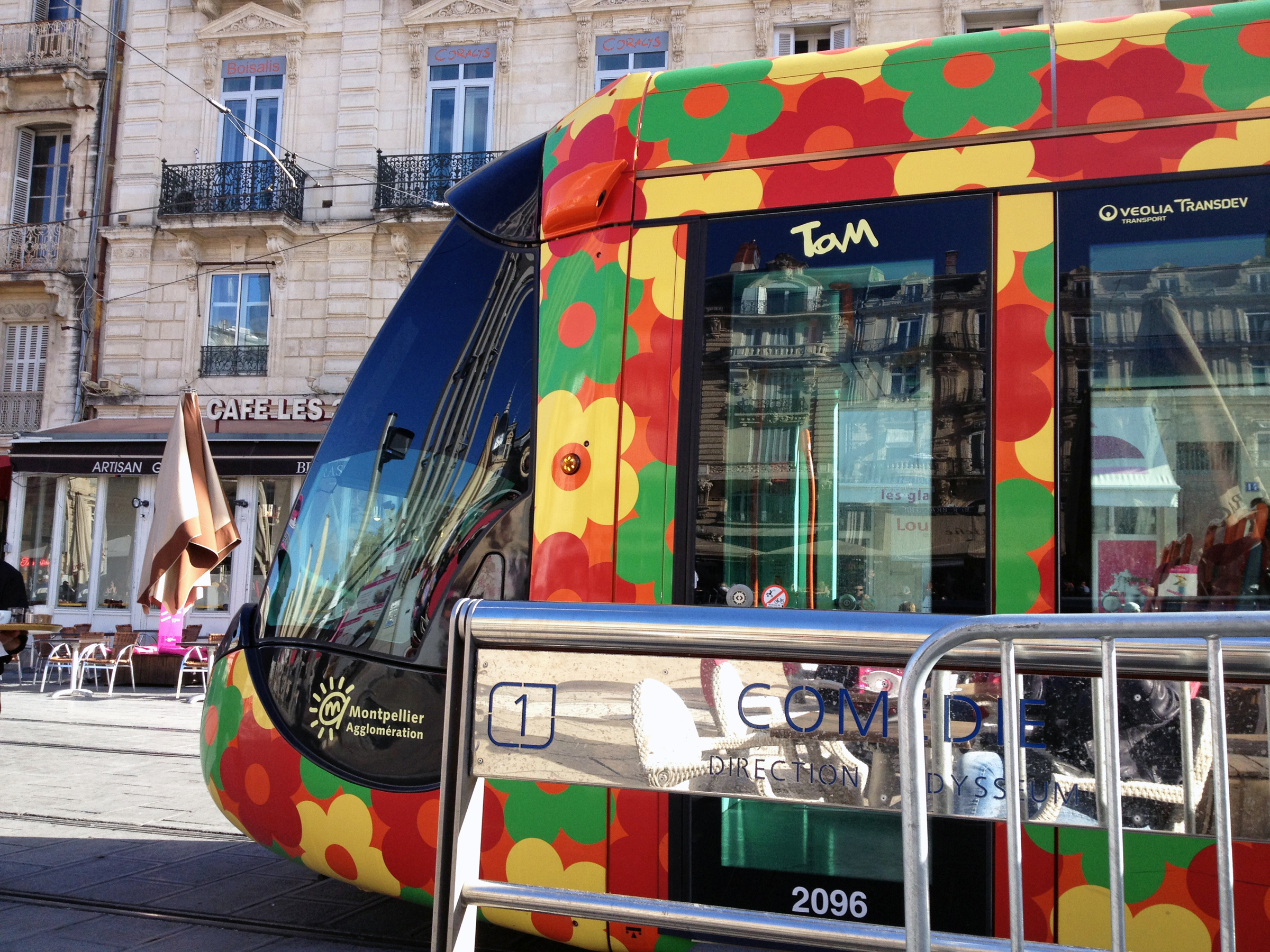
Orange with flowers livery on Line 2.

Line 2 opened for service on 16 December 2006. It is the longest tram line in France, with a length of 17.5 km and with 28 stations. The line is coloured orange. The Victoire 2 station opened 16 April 2007, being the 33rd station on the line. The line travels between Jacou in the northeast and Saint-Jean-de-Védas in the southwest, via Castelnau-le-Lez (on the boundary with Le Crès) and the centre of Montpellier. Line 2 was built at a cost of €450 million. In April 2012, with the opening of Lines 3 and Line 4, Line 2 was diverted to run from Corum to the SNCF station at Saint-Roch through Comédie.

Part of Line 2, between Sabines and Saint-Jean-le-Sec, uses 2.5 km of an abandoned rail line. Line 2 is double tracked between Notre-Dame-de-Sablassou and Sabines; the remaining 3.5 km of the line is single tracked with passing loops.

As with Line 1, stations, station platforms, and urban improvements on Line 2 were done by architect Antoine Garcia-Diaz. The livery of trams on Line 2 is decorated in orange with flowers by Mattia Bonetti. Each tram is named for a historic person in the Montpellier region.

=== Rolling stock ===
Trams on Line 2 are stored at the La Jeune Parque depot, located near the Sabines station.

The rolling stock on Line 2 comprises 24 Citadis 302 trams manufactured by Alstom, with a length of 32.5 m, a width of 2.65 m, and five sections. The trams were delivered between March 2006 and February 2007 and are numbered from 2041 to 2064.

=== Stations ===
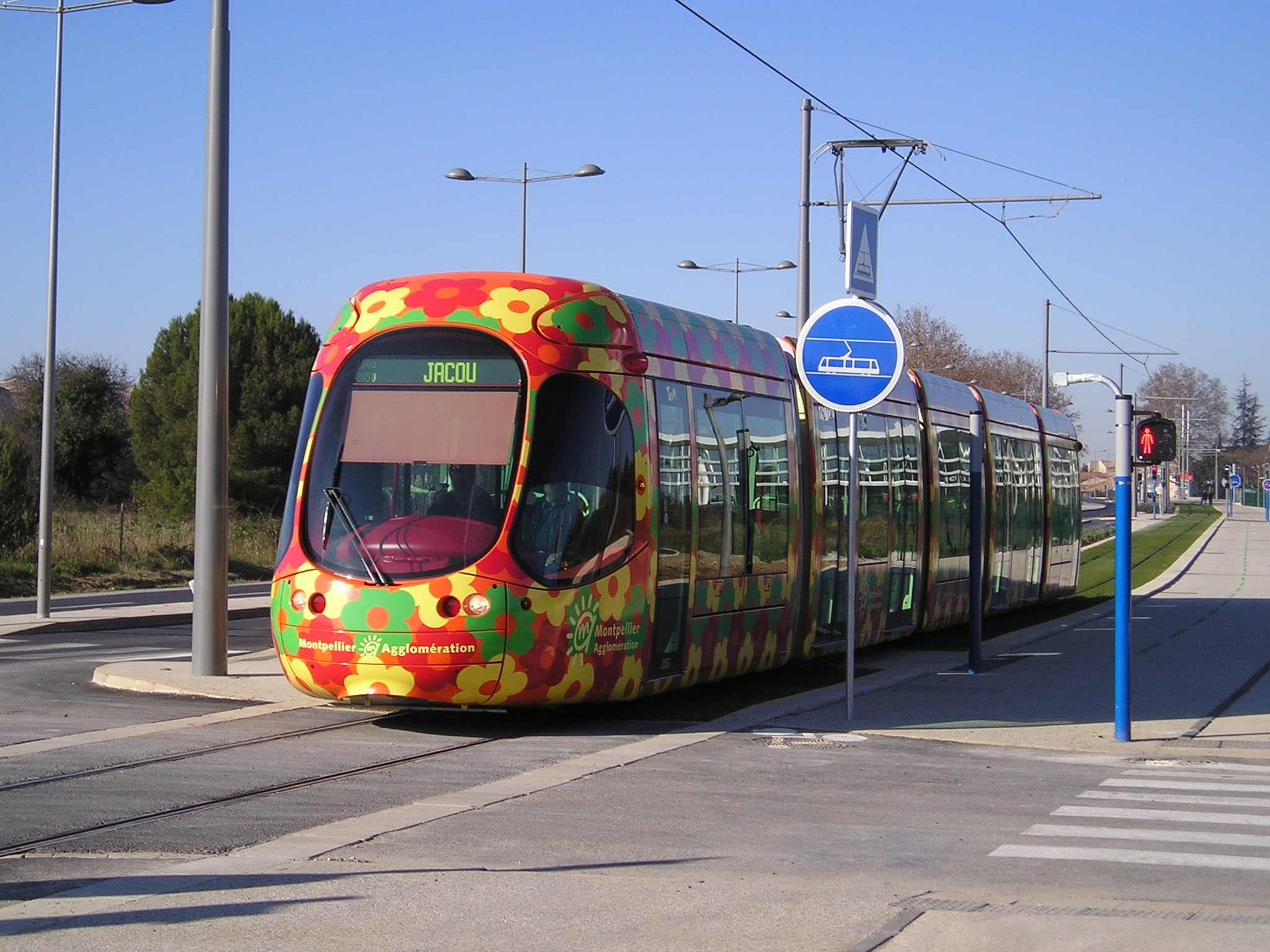
A Line 2 tram in Saint-Jean-de-Védas.

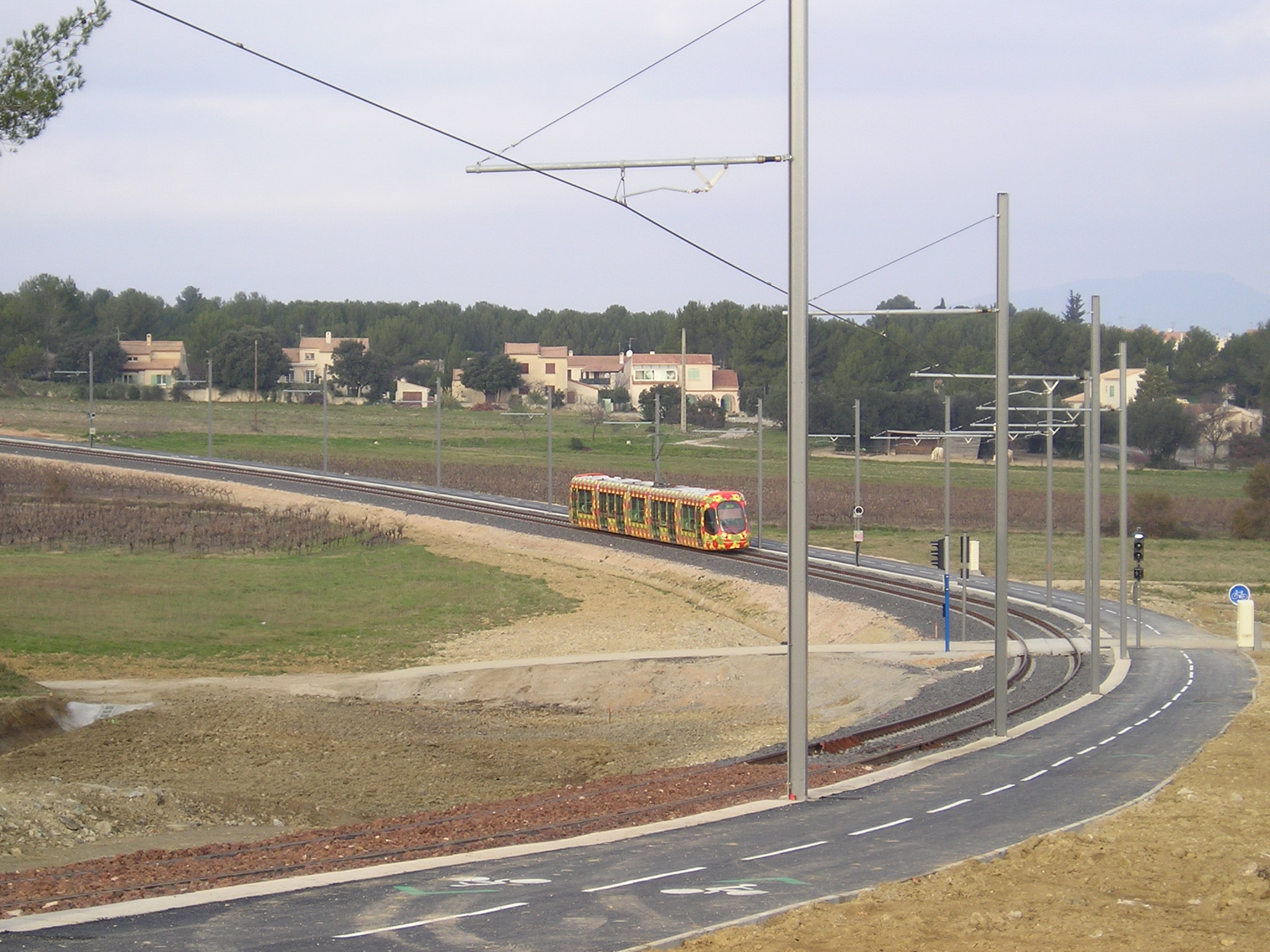
Line 2 in Castelnau-le-Lez along bicycle path.

- Jacou (interchange with a suburban bus route to the northeast)
- Georges Pompidou (interchange with suburban and departmental bus routes to the northeast)
- Via Domitia
- Aube Rouge
- Notre-Dame-de-Sablassou (partial terminus; interchange with bus routes to the northeast of the Agglomeration and the east of the Department of Hérault, and the Line 1 of BRT; envisaged regional train station)
- Centurions
- La Galine
- Clairval
- Charles de Gaulle (interchange with urban and suburban bus routes)
- Saint-Lazare
- Aiguelongue
- Jeu de Mail des Abbés
- Beaux-Arts
- Corum (interchange with Line 1 and 4 and bus routes to northeastern communities in the Agglomeration)
- Comédie (interchange with Line 1)
- Gare Saint-Roch (interchange with Line 1, Line 3 and 4, bus routes, Airport Bus and SNCF trains)
- Rondelet (interchange with Line 4)
- Nouveau Saint-Roch (inetchange with Line 4)
- Saint-Cléophas (interchange with a suburban bus route to the south)
- Lemasson
- Mas Drevon
- Croix d'Argent
- Villeneuve d'Angoulême
- Sabines (partial terminus; interchange with suburban and departmental bus routes to the south; parking; track connections to the La Jeune Parque depot)
- Les Grisettes (located in the Mas d'Astre industrial park; opening subject to urbanization of the district)
- Victoire 2
- La Condamine
- Saint-Jean-le-Sec (interchange with departmental bus routes to the west)
- Amphitrite (expected to open following the urbanization of the ZAC de Roque-Fraisse)
- Saint-Jean-de-Védas Centre (interchange with suburban bus routes to the west)

== Line 3 ==
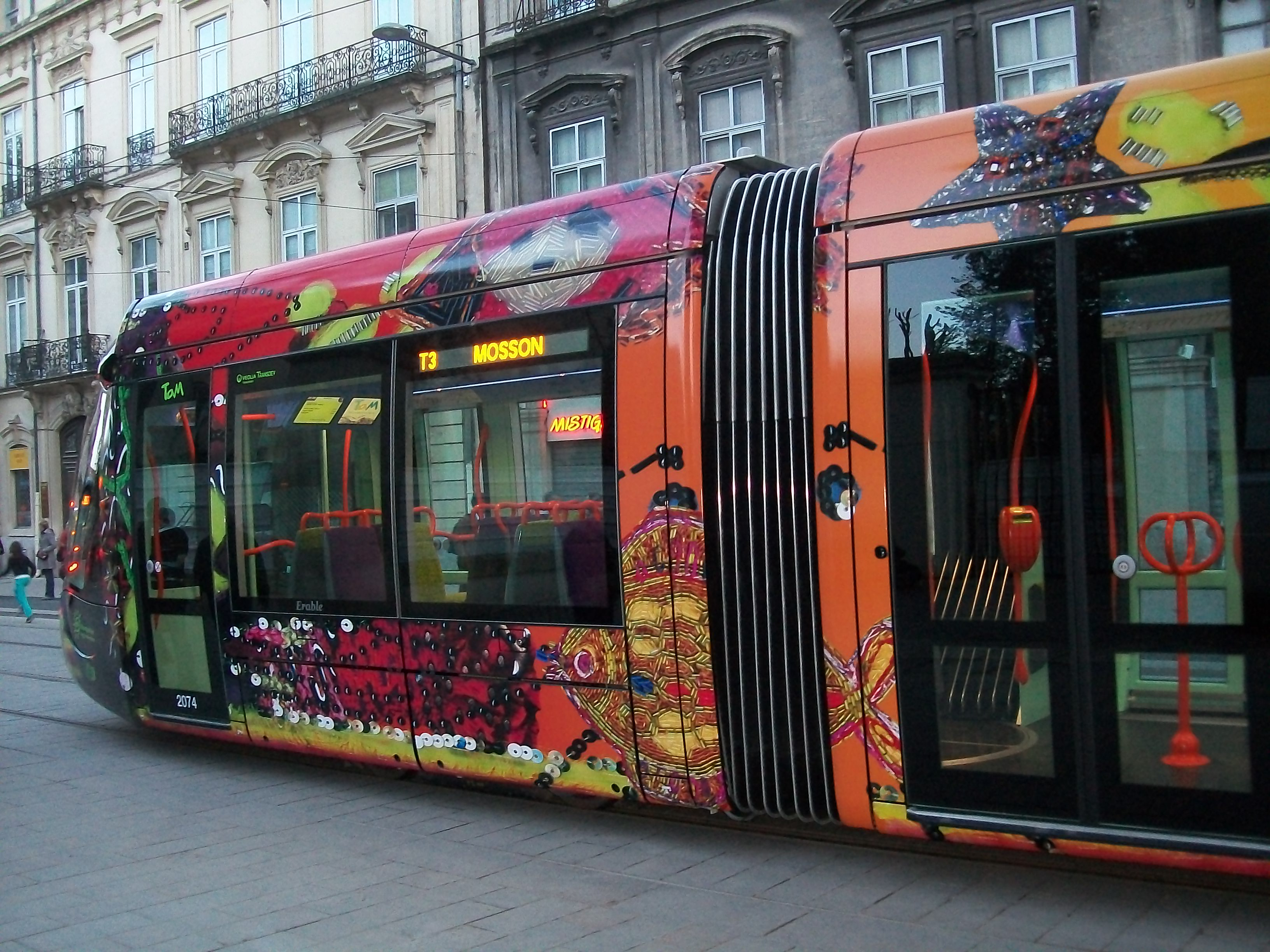
Trams with underwater livery operating on Line 3 at Gare Saint-Roch.

Line 3 was inaugurated on 7 April 2012 with a length of 19.8 km and 29 stations. The line runs from Juvignac in the west to Pérols-Etang de l'Or in the southeast. There is also a three-station branch from Boirargues to Lattes-Centre. The line is coloured green. The rolling stock consists on 19 43m Alstom Citadis trams. The route is as follows:

- The line starts in Juvignac, in a new district, Caunelles, in the north of the village.
- In Montpellier, Line 3 runs parallel to the Mosson.
  - The line goes through neighbourhoods in the west end of the city. A part of this segment loops to the north to serve the Alco neighbourhood.
  - Next, there is a connection to the existing Line 1 and Line 2 at Gare Saint-Roch.
  - After passing Gare Saint-Roch, the line uses the former Line 2 tracks between Gare Saint-Roch and Rives du Lez while Line 2 trams take the shorter Line 1 route between Gare St Roch and Corum.
  - There is an interchange with Line 1 at Port Marianne, then the line travels southeast on Avenue de la Mer and Route de Carnon, and splits with a branch to Lattes and a branch to Pérols.
    - In the community of Lattes, the branch runs from a station in the community of Boirargues, going on its own right-of-way to the centre of Lattes.
    - In the community of Pérols, the branch runs in its own right-of-way parallel to Route de Carnon to a terminus in the southeast of Pérols. The terminus is 800 metres from the Mediterranean Sea.

Lines 3 and 4 cost €530 million. Liveries of the trams on Line 3 were designed with an underwater theme by designer Christian Lacroix.

An extension of the line to the Mediterranean coast at Carnon-Plage, or even as far as La Grande Motte, has been planned for years, but currently neither the route nor the funding has been secured for this plan.

=== Stations ===
- Juvignac
- Mosson (interchange with Line 1 and bus routes to western and south-western communities of the agglomeration)
- Celleneuve
- Pilory
- Hôtel du Departement
- Pergola
- Tonnelles
- Jules Guesde
- Astruc
- Les Arceaux
- Plan Cabanes
- Saint Denis (interchange with future Line 5)
- Observatoire (interchange with Line 4)
- Gare Saint-Roch - République (interchange with Line 1, Line 2 and Line 4, bus routes and SNCF Trains)
- Place Carnot
- Voltaire
- Rives du Lez - Consuls de Mer (interchange with Line 1 and 4 at the Rives du Lez station)
- Moularès - Hôtel de Ville (interchange with Line 1)

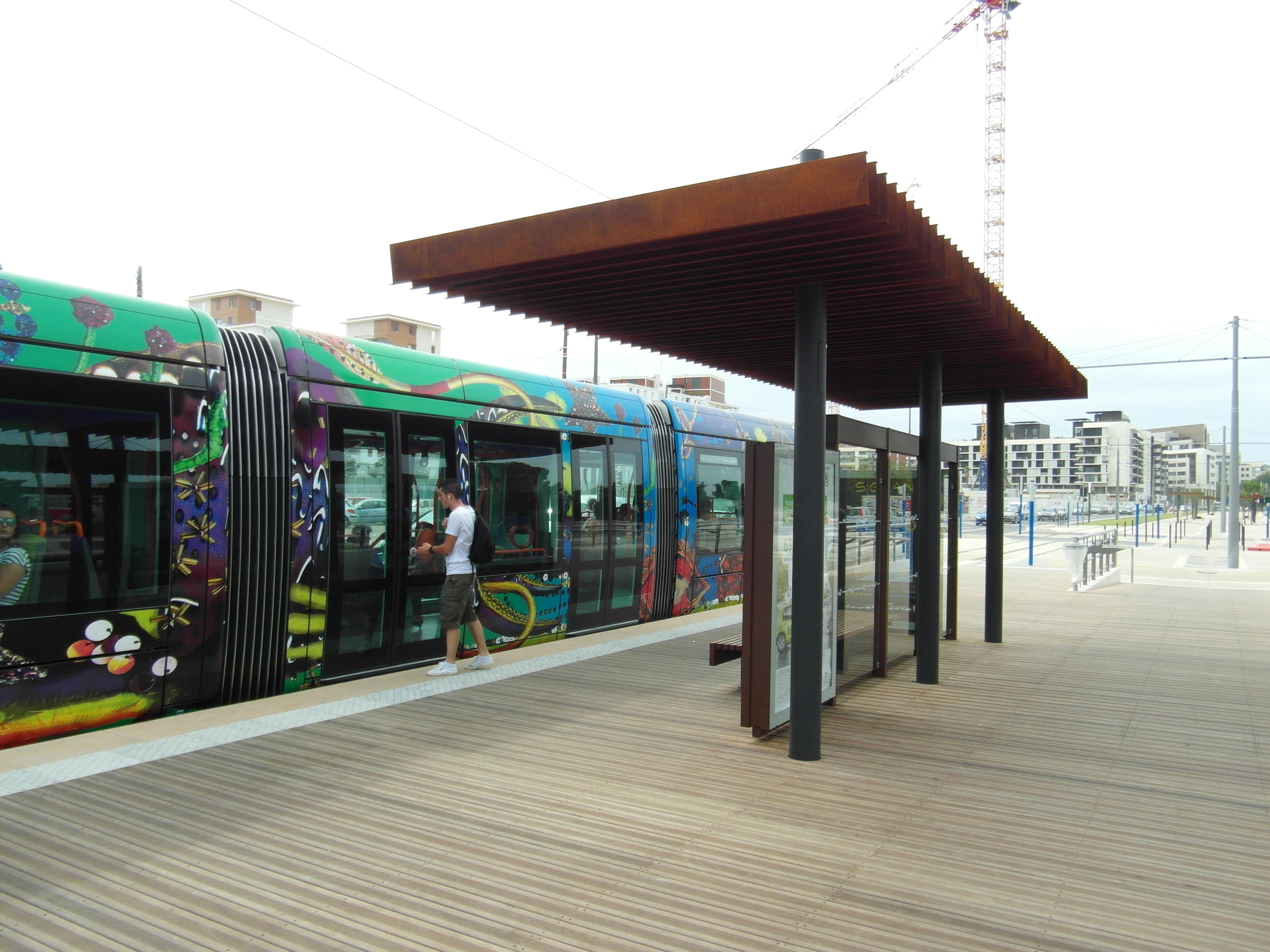
Trams from Line 3 at Pablo Picasso station.

- Port Marianne (interchange with Line 1)
- Pablo Picasso
- A station will open between Pablo Picasso and Boirargues on January 14th, 2026, called Boirargues.
- Boirargues (will be renamed "Soriech" starting on January 14th, 2026)

After Boirargues, Line 3 splits into 2 branches:

- Hauts de Lattes (to be built in late 2026)
- Cougourlude
- Lattes Centre

or

- ÉcoPôle
- Parc Expo (Sud de France Arena)
- Pérols Centre
- Pérols Étang de l'Or (with buses going to Palavas, Carnon and La Grande Motte beaches)

== Line 4 ==
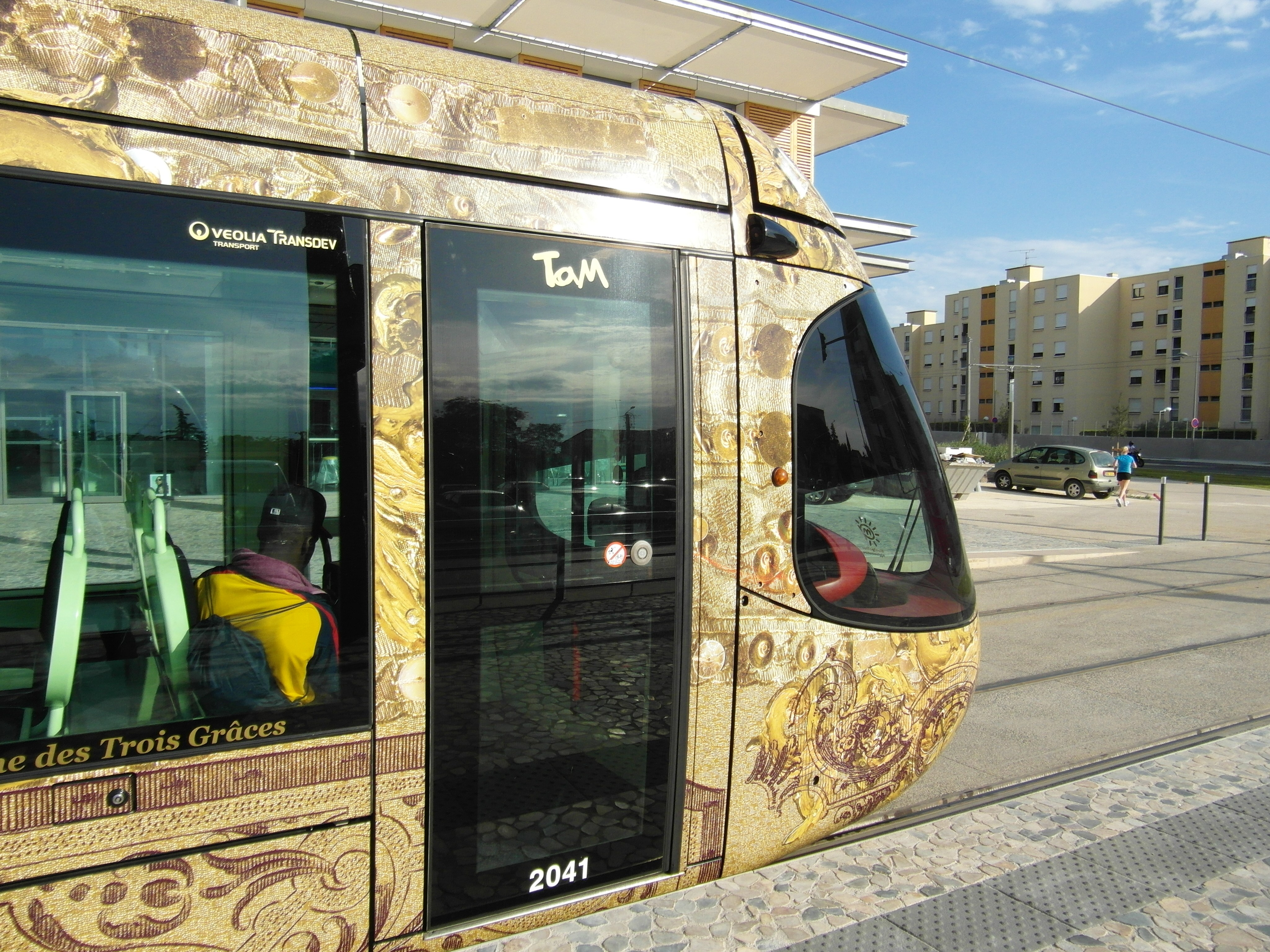
Tram operating for Line 4 with golden sunshine livery.

In June 2009, plans for a fourth line were published. Line 4 was put into service on 7 April 2012, but the 9.2 km circular route was only completed in July 2016 with the inauguration of a new section between Louis Blanc and Observatoire. It consists of 18 stations. It partially runs on parts of lines 1 and 2. It is expected to serve 14000 daily riders. 12 40m Alstom Citadis tram ply the route. The livery for Line 4 reflects the sunshine of the Languedoc-Roussillon region. The livery was inspired from old engravings, with a blaze of gold set off by pearls, stones and jewels forms the backdrop for a series of architectural motifs borrowed from the Château du Peyrou and the Three Graces fountain, two nearby monuments.

Line 4 makes an effective loop around the city since its last segment, at the west of the medieval city center (L'Écusson), is operational on 1 July 2016. Trams marked 4a travel clockwise, while those labeled 4b go counter-clockwise.

=== Stations ===
- Garcia Lorca
- Restanque
- Saint-Martin
- Nouveau Saint-Roch (interchange with Line 2)
- Rondelet (interchange with Line 2)

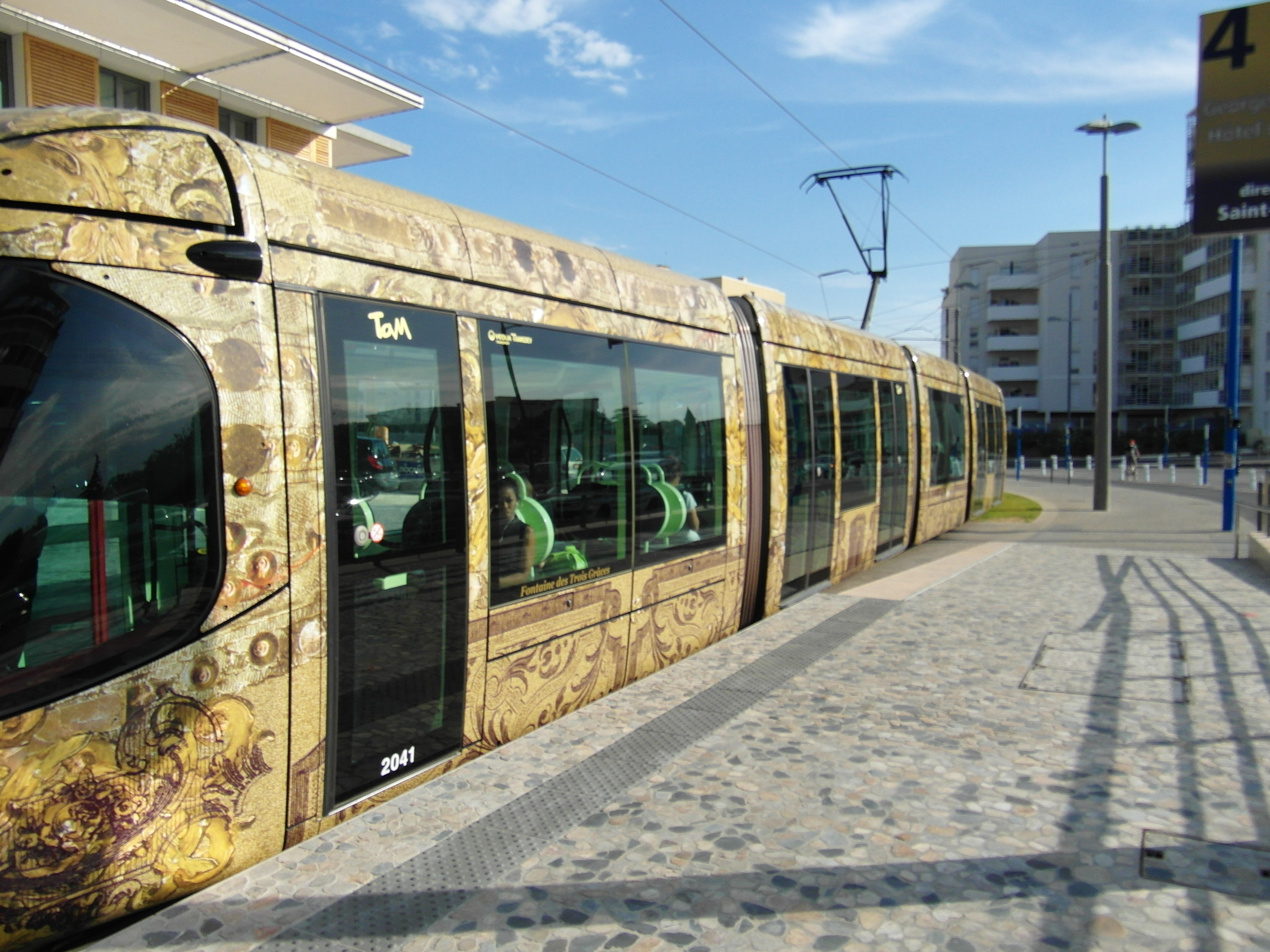
Trams from Line 4 at Georges Frêche-Hôtel de Ville station.

- Gare Saint-Roch - République (interchange with Line 1, Line 2 and Line 3, bus routes and SNCF Trains)
- Observatoire (interchange with Line 3)
- Saint-Guilhem - Courreau (interchange with the future Line 5 of tram)
- Peyrou - Arc de Triomphe (interchange with the future Line 5 of tram, and the future lines 3 and 5 of BRT)
- Albert 1er - Cathédrale (interchange with Line 1, and the future Line 5 of tram)
- Louis Blanc - Agora de la Danse (interchange with Line 1)
- Corum (interchange with Line 1 and 2)
- Les Aubes
- Pompignane
- Place de l'Europe (interchange with Line 1, and the Line 1 of BRT)
- Rives du Lez (interchange with Line 1, and Line 3 at Rives du Lez - Consuls de Mer station)
- Georges Frêche - Hôtel de Ville

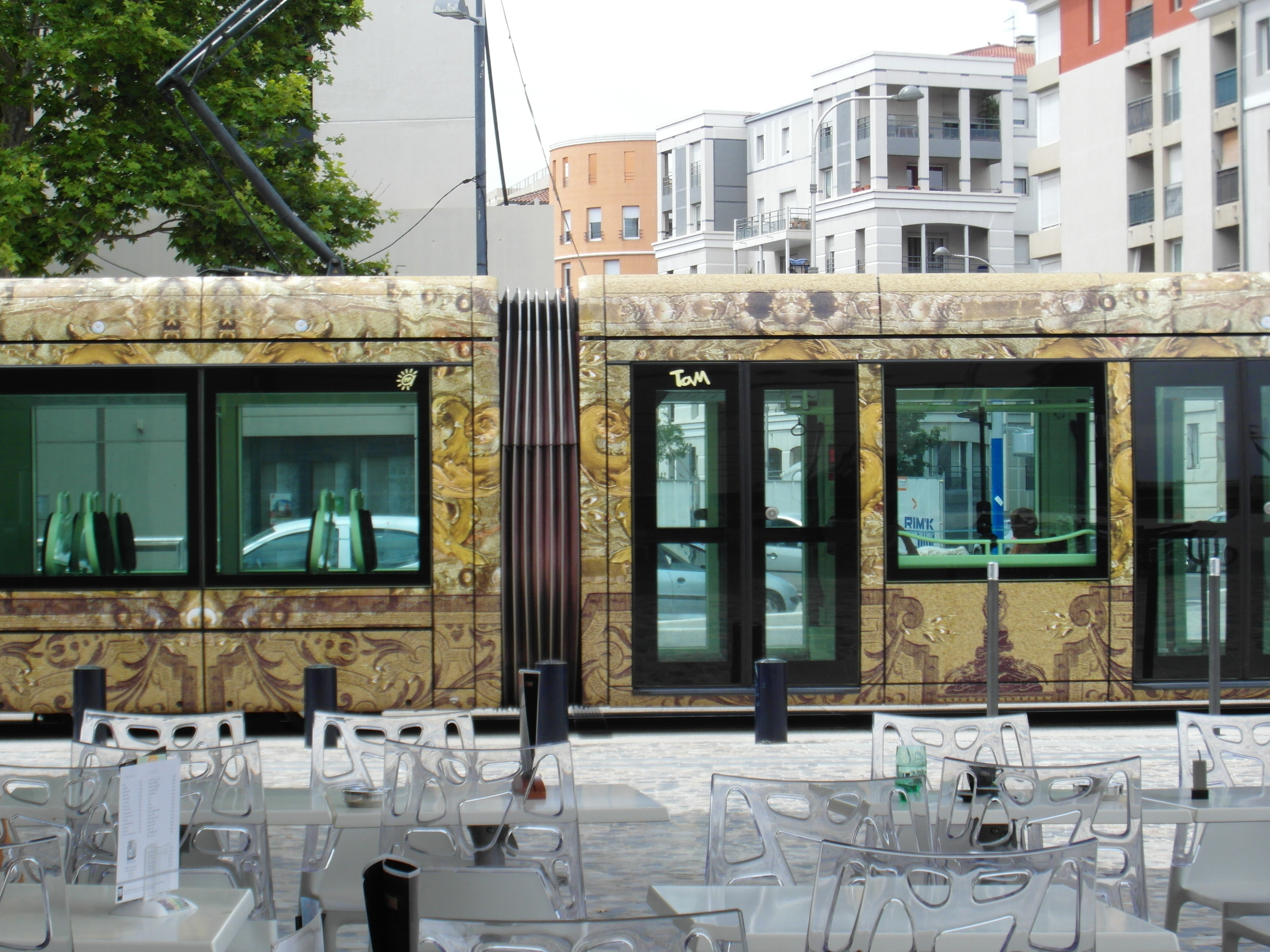
A Line 4 tram at Hôtel de Ville station.

- La Rauze
- Garcia Lorca (interchange with bus routes to southern communities of the Agglomeration, and Palavas beaches)

== Line 5 ==
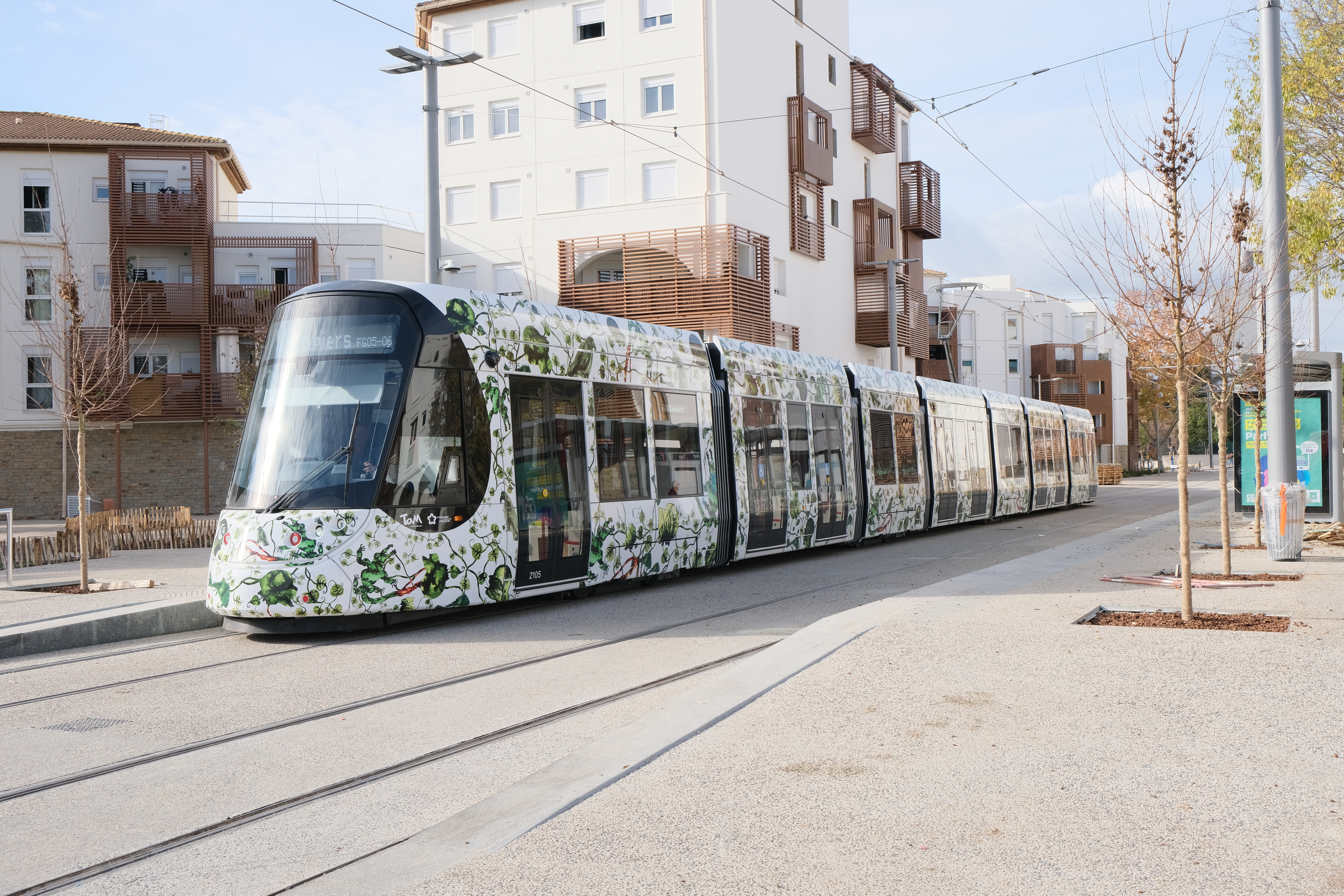
A CAF Urbos tram at Parc Bagatelle station on Line 5.

Proposals for a fifth line were made in 2005, and the project was officially presented in January 2009. The route was determined in late 2012 after a public consultation: the 20.5 km long project was divided up into two phases, the first one consisting of a 15.5 km long light rail between Lavérune, West of Montpellier, and Clapiers, North of town. The second phase, consisting of a northward extension of the first phase towards Prades-le-Lez in the outer suburbs, was expected for 2020, but remained unfunded as of 2013. The initial cost for the new infrastructure was 350 million euros, with the majority of the funding coming from the Montpellier metropolitan authorities, complemented by subsidies from the State, the Region and the Département of Hérault. The public inquiry for the first phase took place in April–May 2013.

Construction was expected to begin in late 2013-early 2014, but a moratorium was established between 2014 and 2016 due to funding issues and protests along part of the route within the Parc Montcalm. But in April 2016, the mayor of Montpellier Philippe Saurel announced that the project was envisaged for 2025 with a shorter and cheaper route. Works started on April 15, 2019. The line opened on 20 December 2025. The cost of the line was 440 million euros. Twenty-two trams are assigned to the line, as part of a larger order of sixty CAF Urbos trams to be used on the wider network.

=== Stations ===
- Clapiers
- Montferrier-sur-Lez
- Agropolis
- Plan des 4 Seigneurs
- CNRS - Zoo du Lunaret
- Pôle Chimie Balard
- Université Paul Valéry
- Saint-Éloi – Docteur Pezet (interchange with line 1)
- Boutonnet - Cité des Arts (interchange with line 1)
- Stade Philippidès (interchange with line 1)
- Albert 1er - Jardin des Plantes (interchange with line 1 at Place Albert 1er - Saint Charles station, line 4)
- Peyrou - Arc de Triomphe (interchange with line 4, and the future line 3 and 5 of BRT)
- Saint Guilhem - Courreau (interchange with line 4)
- Gambetta/Gambetta Saint-Denis (interchange with line 3 at Gambetta - Chaptal station)
- Parc Clémenceau
- Place du 8 mai 1945
- Cité Créative Parc Montcalm
- Chamberte Les Roses
- Estanove
- Yves du Manoir
- Ovalie
- Parc Bagatelle
- Parc Font Colombe
- Parc des Bouisses
- Grès de Montpellier (interchange with the future line 5 of BRT)

== See also ==
- Trams in France
- List of town tramway systems in France
