= Garouste =

Garouste is a surname. Notable people with the surname include:

- Élisabeth Garouste (born 1946), French interior designer
- Gérard Garouste (born 1946), French artist, husband of Élisabeth

== See also ==
- Garoute
