= Kasmin Gallery =

Art gallery in Manhattan, New York

Coordinates: 40.750219°N 74.002745°W

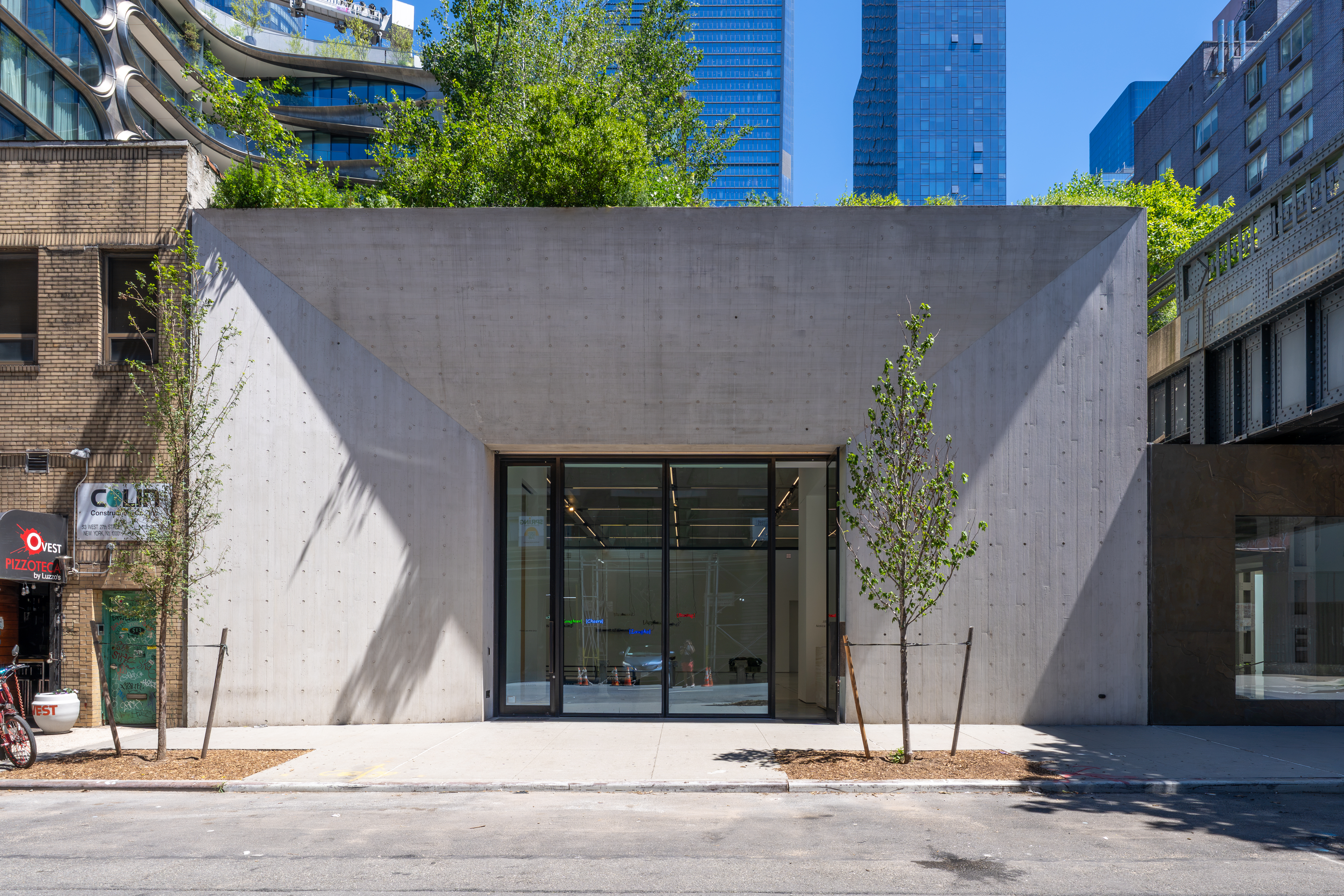
- Entrance to the Kasmin Gallery in 2026
- Formerly: Paul Kasmin Gallery
- Type: Art gallery
- Founded: 1989
- Founder: Paul Kasmin
- Website: www.kasmingallery.com

The Kasmin Gallery, formerly known as the Paul Kasmin Gallery, is a New York City fine art gallery, founded in SoHo in 1989.

== History ==
The gallery was founded by its namesake as the Paul Kasmin Gallery in 1989 and was initially housed at 74 Grand Street in SoHo, Manhattan. Kasmin moved the gallery from SoHo to Chelsea at 297 10th Avenue in 2000. The gallery's first exhibition featured a collection of abstract paintings by Peter Schuyff.

In 2002, the Paul Kasmin Gallery presented work at the inaugural edition of Art Basel in Miami Beach, Florida. The gallery itself continued holding exhibitions, including those for Frank Stella (2003) and Robert Indiana (2004).

In 2007, Kasmin Gallery gave the first New York exhibition in nearly 30 years to the furniture-sculpture of the French artists Claude and François-Xavier Lalanne; he went on to show designers like Ron Arad, Mattia Bonetti, David Wiseman and Jasper Morrison. Along with Michael Shvo, he also curated the 2014 exhibition Les Lalanne: The Poetry of Sculpture at the S|2 Gallery of Sotheby's Auction House 2in New York. It included rare Lalanne sculptures in a midnight garden setting.

In October 2018, the gallery officially became known as the "Kasmin Gallery", and unveiled a new 3,000 square-foot space at 509 West 27th Street in Chelsea. The new location was designed by architect Markus Dochantschi of StudioMDA, and features 28 skylights and a 5,000 square-foot rooftop sculpture garden situated parallel to the High Line park. The first exhibition held in the rooftop garden contained sculptures by Joel Shapiro. The inaugural exhibition inside the new gallery space featured a series of watercolors by Walton Ford.

At one point, the gallery operated four exhibition spaces along one block of West 27th Street near 10th Avenue.

In 2019, Kasmin Gallery closed one of its leased spaces at 515 West 27th Street. That same year, it was scheduled to open a new venue at 514 West 28th Street again designed by StudioMDA, with 3,400 square feet (320 square metres) of private viewing room and office space and 460 square feet (43 square metres) of public exhibition space.

Paul Kasmin died on March 23, 2020, at the age of 60 following a long illness. He was the son of the noted British art dealer John Kasmin. Kasmin is credited with helping build New York City's Chelsea gallery scene.

== Artists ==
Kasmin Gallery represents numerous living artists, including:

- Diana al-Hadid (since 2021)
- Laylah Ali (since 2014)
- Ali Banisadr
- Tina Barney
- Taner Ceylan (since 2012)
- Walton Ford
- Matvey Levenstein (since 2019)
- Jasper Morrison (since 2019)
- Roxy Paine

In addition, the gallery manages various artist estates, including:

- Constantin Brâncuși
- William Copley
- Stuart Davis (since 2018)
- Jane Freilicher (since 2018)
- Lee Krasner (since 2016)
- Robert Motherwell (since 2022)
- Jackson Pollock (since 2024)
- James Rosenquist
- Dorothea Tanning
