= Markus Dochantschi =

German-born architect based in New York

Markus Dochantschi (born 1968, Neuburg, Germany) is a German-American architect based in New York. He is a registered architect in the United Kingdom and Germany, as well as a member of the American Institute of Architects. As the founder and principal of studioMDA (Dochantschi Inc.), a New York–based, multidisciplinary design firm, Dochantschi has been recognized as one of the world's preeminent designers of art and cultural spaces. Dochantschi and his firm have designed more than thirty galleries, and over 200 international art booths and exhibitions, earning Dochantschi the title of "the Art World's New Go-To Architect” in 2017. The firm has also designed institutional buildings, auction houses, and private residences.

== Education and early years ==
Dochantschi was trained as an architect in Darmstadt, Germany and received his Masters of Architecture degree in 1995. He was granted two scholarships including a DAAD scholarship which enabled him to work with Arata Isozaki and Tom Heneghan in Tokyo, Japan. Dochantschi was subsequently invited back to Tokyo by Fumihiko Maki in 1995.

== Professional life ==
Following his time in Tokyo, Dochantschi joined London-based firm Zaha Hadid Architects. He continued to work closely with Zaha Hadid from 1995 until 2002, as a director, project director, project architect, and designer on projects including the Contemporary Arts Center in Cincinnati, Landesgartenschau Germany, Bergisel Ski Jump, and the Vista Master plan Singapore, among many others.

In 2002, Dochantschi established studioMDA in New York. His work includes high-end and affordable residential, cultural, commercial, institutional, mixed-use, non-profit, and educational projects. He has designed spaces for New York–based galleries including Andrew Kreps Gallery, Bortolami Gallery, Anton Kern Gallery, Lisson Gallery, Carpenters Workshop Gallery, Richard Taittinger Gallery, Nahmad Contemporary, 303 Gallery, David Nolan Gallery, High Line Nine, and four galleries for Kasmin Gallery, as well as the Copenhagen-based new Faurschou Foundation in Brooklyn and Istanbul-based galleries Dirimart Gallery and Collectorspace. Dochantschi is known for his work on cultural institutions, showing a sensitivity to proportion, light, and, flexibility of space. In 2017, Artsy magazine featured him in the article, “These Architects Are Transforming the Way We Experience Art” listing studioMDA as one of the firms “behind some of the most inventive and influential cultural spaces today.” Dochantschi's style has been described as “airy,” “minimalist,” and “both modern and functional”.

== Academia ==
In 2003 Dochantschi co-taught an Advanced Studio at Yale University with Zaha Hadid, Stefan Behnisch, and Gerald Hines. Dochantschi served as the director of the Global Cities Architecture Program at Columbia GSAPP from 2013–2015 as well as Adjunct Professor for Planning and Preservation Advanced Studio from 2008–2017. Dochantschi has also been a Guest Lecturer at the Harvard Graduate School of Design and a guest critic at the Architectural Association School of Architecture, Columbia University, The Cooper Union, the University of Pennsylvania, Princeton University, the ETH Zurich, and the University of Applied Arts Vienna.

== Selected projects ==
=== Completed ===
==== Cultural ====
- 2025 Dirimart Gallery, London, UK
- 2025 Esther Schipper Gallery, Seoul, Korea
- 2024 Marian Goodman Gallery, Tribeca, New York
- 2024 Karma Gallery, Chelsea, New York
- 2024 Matthew Brown Gallery, Tribeca, New York
- 2024 Alexander Gray Gallery, Tribeca, New York
- 2023 Schoelkopf Gallery, Tribeca, New York
- 2023 Nino Mier Gallery, Tribeca, New York
- 2023 60 White, New York
- 2023 Timothy Taylor Gallery, New York
- 2023 Nino Mier Gallery, Soho, New York
- 2022 Esther Schipper Gallery, Seoul, Korea
- 2022 Judith Whitney Godwin Foundation, New York
- 2022 Templon Gallery, New York
- 2022 Print Center New York, New York
- 2022 PPOW Gallery expansion, New York
- 2021 Harper's Gallery, New York
- 2021 George Adams Gallery, New York
- 2020 Luhring Augustine Gallery, New York
- 2020 PPOW Gallery, New York
- 2020 Phillips Headquarters, New York
- 2019 Andrew Kreps Gallery, New York, NY
- 2019 Faurschou Foundation, Brooklyn, NY
- 2018 High Line Nine, New York
- 2018 Kasmin Gallery (27th St), New York
- 2017 Anton Kern Gallery, New York
- 2017 Bortolami Gallery, NY
- 2016 Carpenters Workshop Gallery, New York
- 2016 Dirimart Gallery, Turkey
- 2016 Lisson Gallery, New York
- 2015 Paul Kasmin Gallery (297 10th Avenue), New York
- 2015 Richard Taittinger Gallery, New York
- 2014 Paul Kasmin Gallery Shop, New York
- 2014 Edward Tyler Nahem Fine Art, New York
- 2013 303 Gallery, New York
- 2013 Nahmad Contemporary, New York
- 2012 Collectorspace Istanbul Gallery, Turkey
- 2011 Paul Kasmin Gallery, New York
- 2008 David Nolan Gallery, New York

==== Residential ====
- 2024 Upper East Side Apartment, New York
- 2024 Wellness Spa, Upper East Side Residence
- 2022 West Village Townhouse, New York
- 2022 Upper East Side Townhouse, New York
- 2021 Waverly Avenue Residence, Brooklyn, New York
- 2020 Water's Edge Residence, New York
- 2020 Watertower Penthouse, New York
- 2020 Franklin St. Residences and Gallery, New York
- 2020 West Village Carriage House, New York
- 2018 East 78th Street Townhouse, New York
- 2018 Pool Pavilion, Bridgehampton, New York
- 2018 Southampton Residence, Long Island, New York
- 2018 Sagaponack Beach House II, Long Island, New York
- 2017 East 71st Street Townhouse, New York
- 2014 Sur Lago Residence, Tuxedo Park, New York
- 2014 UES Townhouse, New York
- 2014 Fort Greene Townhouse, Brooklyn, New York
- 2014 Fifth Avenue Penthouse, New York
- 2013 West Village Carriage House, New York
- 2013 137 Franklin Street, New York
- 2012 Detiger Loft, New York
- 2012 Sagaponack Barn, Sagaponack, New York
- 2009 Tuxedo Park Residence, New York
- 2009 Showtime House, New York
- 2008 Anchorage Residence, Alaska
- 2007 Stockholm Penthouse, Sweden
- 2007 740 Park Avenue, New York
- 2007 Noho Loft, New York, NY
- 2007 Greenwich Street Residence, New York
- 2007 Governor’s Road Residence, Bronxville
- 2007 Park Avenue Penthouse, New York,
- 2006 Maplewood Residence, New Jersey
- 2006 Chappaqua Residence, Chappaqua, New York
- 2006 Central Park West Residence, New York
- 2005 Chile Beach House, Chile
- 2005 Lima Beach House, Lima, Peru
- 2005 Bronxville Residence, Bronxville, New York

==== Institutional ====
- 2022 Center for Advanced Mobility, Aachen, Germany

==== Commercial ====
- 2024 Liberty City Ventures HQ, Gramercy, New York
- 2022 Ping Pod Fort Lee, New York
- 2022 Ping Pod Lexington, New York
- 2022 PingPod Upper East Side, New York
- 2022 PingPod Astoria, New York
- 2022 PingPod, Philadelphia
- 2022 Harper's Books, New York
- 2021 Phillips Headquarters offices, New York
- 2020 West 13 St. Lobby, New York
- 2020 PingPod, New York
- 2019 House of Bumble, New York
- 2011 Exerblast, New York
- 2010 Gumulira Clinic, Malawi
- 2009 High Line Office, New York
- 2008 McIntosh Townhouse
- 2007 Audi Showroom, New York
- 2007 Tracy Anderson Dance Studio, New York
- 2005 WhatIF, New York.

==== Exhibitions ====
- 2025 "Safe Space", Jin Meyerson, Perrotin, LA
- 2025 "Calder In Flight", Nahmad Contempporary, Gstaad Airport, Switzerland
- 2024 "Johnny Depp: A Bunch of Stuff", Chelsea, New York
- 2024 "Sarah Morris: All Systems Fail", Bern, Switzerland
- 2024 "Sarah Morris: All Systems Fail", Stuttgart, Germany
- 2024 "Sarah Morris: All Systems Fail", Krefeld, Germany
- 2024 "Walton Ford: Lion of God", Venice Biennale, Italy
- 2024 "Tomokazu Matsuyama: Mythologies", Venice Biennale, Italy
- 2024 "Dubuffet x Giacometti", Nahmad Contemporary, New York
- 2023 "Richard Prince: Freaks", Nahmad Contemporary, New York
- 2023 "Korea Week: Origin, Emergence, Return", Rockefeller Center, New York
- 2023 "Sarah Morris: All Systems Fail", Deichtorhallen Hamburg, Germany
- 2023 "Key Sage and Yves Tanguy: Ring of Iron, Ring of Wool", New York
- 2022 "Jean-Michel Basquiat", Nahmad Contemporary, New York
- 2022 "Picasso and the Process of Creation", Helly Nahmad Gallery, New York
- 2019 "Beverly Pepper Cor-Ten", Marlborough Contemporary, New York
- 2018 "TIME SPACE EXISTENCE", Palazzo Mora, Venice, Italy
- 2017 Les Lalanne, Paul Kasmin Gallery, New York
- 2016 Ed Ruscha's Ribbon Words, Edward Tyler Nahem Fine Art, New York
- 2016 Drawing Room, David Nolan Gallery, New York (curated and designed by studioMDA's founder, Markus Dochantschi)
- 2016 – 2017 IMPASSE RONSIN, Paul Kasmin Gallery, New York
- 2015 Max Ernst PARAMYTHS: SCULPTURE, 1934–1967, Paul Kasmin Gallery, New York
- 2015 Robert Motherwell, Works on paper 1951–1991, Paul Kasmin Gallery, New York
- 2015 Mnemosyne, de Chirico and Antiquity, Helly Nahmad (New York art collector), New York
- 2014 Still Life, Nahmad Contemporary, New York
- 2014 Le Chant de La Grenouille The Surrealists in Conversation, Helly Nahmad (New York art collector), New York
- 2013 Brancusi in New York, Paul Kasmin Gallery, New York
- 2011 National Arts Club Installation, New York
- 2011 Soutine-Bacon, Helly Nahmad (New York art collector), New York

==== Art Fairs ====
- Independent Art Fair, Spring Studio, New York (2023)
- Independent 20th Century Art Fair, New York (2022-2023)
- 1-54 Contemporary African Art Fair Masterplan, New York

David Nolan Gallery, NY

- Art Basel (2005–2007, 2009–2019, 2022)
- Art Basel Miami Beach (2005–2019, 2022-2024)
- Frieze Art Fair, New York (2017)

Dirimart Gallery Istanbul

- Art Basel Hong Kong (2016–2017)
- Armory Show, NY (2017)
- Art Basel (2018)
- CI Istanbul (2016)

Helly Nahmad (New York art collector), NY

- Art Basel (2010–2019, 2021-2025)
- Art Basel Miami Beach (2007–2019, 2021-2024)
- FIAC /Foire Internationale d'Art Contemporain, Paris (2012,2016)
- The European Fine Art Fair, NY (2011, 2017-2020, 2022)

Edward Tyler Nahem Fine Art

- TEFAF, NY (2023-2025)
- Abu Dhabi Art, Abu Dhabi (2011,2014)
- Armory Show, NY (2011,2017)
- Art Basel (2009–2019, 2021-2025)
- Art Basel Hong Kong (2015,2016)
- Art Basel Miami Beach (2010–2019, 2021-2024)
- Frieze Art Fair, London (2012,2013)
- The Seattle Art Fair, Seattle (2016)
- The European Fine Art Fair, NY (2017-2019, 2022)
- FIAC /Foire Internationale d'Art Contemporain, Paris (2017)
- ARCO, Madrid (2019, 2020)

Paul Kasmin Gallery, NY

- Abu Dhabi Art, Abu Dhabi (2014)
- Armory Show, NY (2016-2018)
- Art Basel (2012,2015–2021)
- Art Basel Hong Kong (2014–2019)
- Art Basel Miami Beach (2011,2013–2018,2021-2022)
- American Art Dealer Association, NY (2015–2018)
- Art Stage Singapore, Singapore (2015)
- EXPO Chicago, Chicago (2016, 2017)
- Frieze Art Fair, London (2011)
- Frieze Art Fair, New York (2014–2016,2018,2019,2022)
- The European Fine Art Fair, Maastricht (2014,2015)
- The European Fine Art Fair, NY (2014,2017,2018)
- Zona Maco Arte Contemporaneo, Mexico (2015–2017)

Nahmad Contemporary, NY

- FIAC /Foire Internationale d'Art Contemporain, Paris (2014-2019,2021)
- Frieze Art Fair, London (2017,2019,2021)
- Independent Art Fair (2022)
- Paris+ Art Basel (2022-2024)

Richard Taittinger, NY

- Art Basel Miami Beach (2018)
- Paris Photo (2018)
- Armory Show, NY (2018,2019)
- Art 1-54, New York (2019)

Malborough Gallery, NY

- Art Basel (2019)
- Art Basel Hong Kong (2018,2020)
- Art Basel Miami Beach (2018)
- Frieze Art Fair, London (2019)

Anton Kern, NY

- Art Basel (2017-2022)
- Art Basel Miami Beach (2017,2018,2020)
- FIAC /Foire Internationale d'Art Contemporain, Paris (2018,2019)
- Frieze Art Fair, New York (2018)

Van de Weghe, New York

- The European Fine Art Fair, NY (2017)

Johyun Gallery, South Korea

- Art Basel (2021)

Hammer Galleries, New York

- Art Basel Miami Beach (2017)

Michael Rosenfeld Gallery, NY

- Art Basel Miami Beach (2011)

Fine Sound Group

- Munich High End (2015)

Gary Nader Art Center, New York

- Art Rio (2016)

==== Conceptual ====
- Urban Mobility Fleet Center, West Side Manhattan, 2022, New York
- Phillips Headquarters, 2021, Hong Kong
- Governors Island Climate Center, 2021, New York
- Hudson Yards Phase II Towers, 2019, New York
- FARROC, 2013, Queens, New York
- Condominiums, 2013, Tanzania
- Osnabrück Comprehensive School, 2011, Germany
- ARC Competition, 2010, Colorado
- Munich Olympics, 2010, Germany
- Raising Malawi, 2009, Malawi
- Tempelhof Competition, 2008, Berlin, Germany
- Bam Tower, 2007, New York
- Governors Island Biomass Park, 2006, New York City
- Harbor Park Pavilion, 2005
- Forsythe Dance Studio, 2004, Vermont
- U2 Tower Competition, 2003, Dublin, Ireland

=== In Progress ===
- Private Art Museum, Thailand
- Harper's Gallery, Thailand
- Upper East Side Gallery, New York
- West Village Townhouse, New York
- Tribeca Residential Project, New York

== Other activities ==
Dochantschi served on the Green Codes Committee in 2012, created to make recommendations for New York City Building Code revisions for greening the environment.
