= Iván Navarro =

Iván Navarro may refer to:

- Iván Navarro (tennis) (born 1981), Spanish tennis player
- Iván Navarro (artist) (born 1972), Chilean artist
