= SMTU =

SMTU may refer to:

- Société montpelliéraine de transport urbain, the predecessor to Transports de l'agglomération de Montpellier, the public transport company in Montpellier, France
- Servicio Municipal de Transportes Urbanos, a predecessor of TUSSAM (Transportes Urbanos de Sevilla, Sociedad Anónima Municipal), the company responsible for managing the service buses and trams urban city of Seville, Spain
- Singapore Malay Teachers' Union, a public sector union affiliated with the National Trades Union Congress
