= Garoute =

Garoute is a surname. Notable people with the surname include:

- Alice Garoute (1874–1950), Haitian suffragist and women's rights advocate
- Charles H. Garoute (1854–1910), American attorney and judge
- Jean-Claude Garoute (1935–2006), Haitian painter and sculptor

== See also ==
- Garouste
