= Daniel Templon =

French contemporary art dealer (born 1945)

Daniel Templon (born 1945) is a French contemporary art dealer. In 1966, he founded his first contemporary art gallery in Paris.

== Galerie Templon ==
With no artistic background, Templon opened his first gallery in Paris in 1966. He has declared that he got help from Leo Castelli in the early 1970s: "He trusted me and helped me to introduce the works of young American conceptualists and minimalists to Europe, such as Donald Judd, Richard Serra, etc. That was how the gallery became known in the early 1970s, which was a key moment in my career". Galerie Templon was the first to show the likes of Jeff Koons, Richard Serra, the Chapman Brothers and Kehinde Wiley in France, as well as championing local talent such as Christian Boltanski, Ben Vautier and Martin Barré. Nathalie Obadia worked at the gallery from 1988 to 1992.

Galerie Templon operated an outpost in Milan between 1972 and 1976. In 2013, Templon expanded his gallery to Brussels, managed by his son Mathieu Templon. In 2018, Galerie Templon opened a second location in Paris; the three-story, 700 m^{2} (7,500 sq ft) space is situated at 28 rue du Grenier Saint Lazare, near the Centre Pompidou, and was designed by Jean-Michel Wilmotte.

In 2022, Galerie Templon announced plans to open a 600 m^{2} (6,500 sq ft) space at 293 Tenth Avenue in New York's Chelsea area, designed by architect Markus Dochantschi's StudioMDA.

== Other activities ==
In 1972, Templon co-founded the bilingual contemporary art magazine art press with his partner, art critic and erotic biographer Catherine Millet. He then co founded Art Studio magazine with Ann Hindry in 1986.
