= Gérard Garouste =

French painter

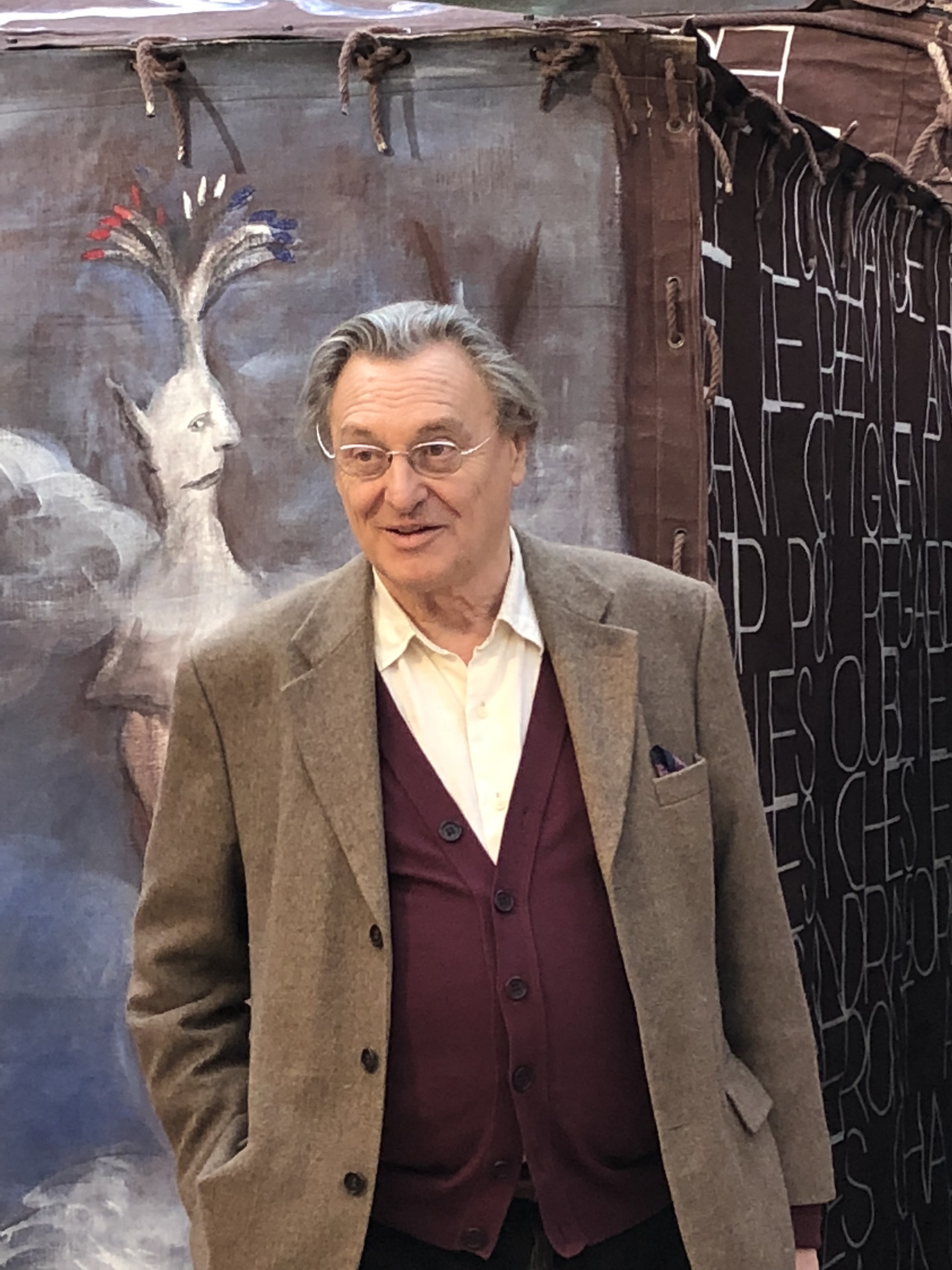
- Born: 10 March 1946 (age 80)
- Known for: Contemporary artist

Gérard Garouste (born 10 March 1946) is a French artist having the primary field of work as visual and performative domain.

Since 1979, he has lived and worked in Marcilly-sur-Eure in Normandy, where he founded an educational and social action group to help children with art called La Source.

He has been married to designer Élisabeth Garouste since 1969.

== Biography ==
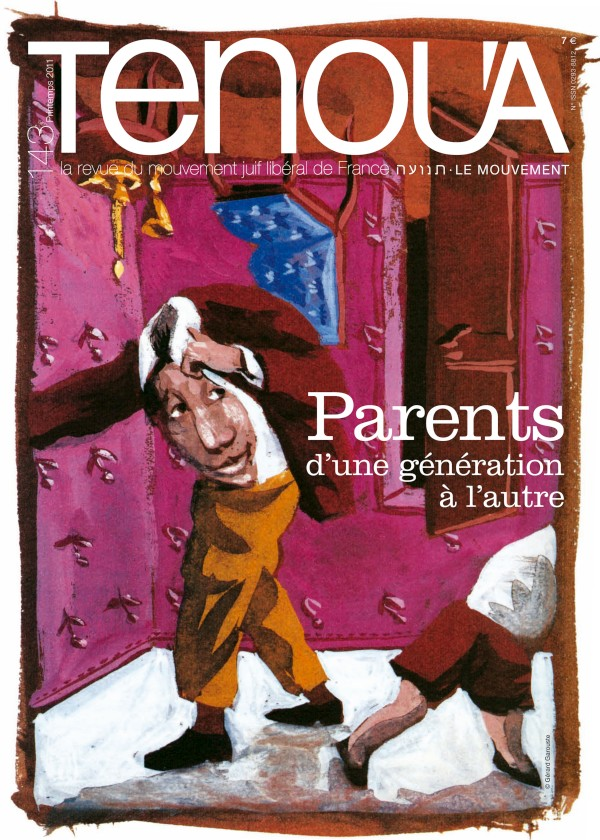
"Afikomane", a painting of Gérard Garouste on the cover of the French magazine Tenoua.

Gérard Garouste was born in Paris. He studied at the École des Beaux-Arts de Paris from 1965 to 1972 in the atelier of Gustave Singier. It was there he discovered Duchamp. Around this time, he created several works of scenography for his friend, author and director Jean-Michel Ribes, notably for the productions of Il faut que le Sycomore coule and Jacky parady. In 1977, he presented at the Palace theater Le Classique et l'Indien, a show he wrote, directed, and decorated for. He would stay with the Palace until 1982 as a scenographer and painter.

In 1980, he had his first art show at the Durand-Dessert gallery, showing figurative, mythological, and allegorical paintings. This show brought him national recognition, and then, international. His first international show took place in New York City in 1982 at the Holly Solomon Gallery. Others followed, such as those at the Leo Castelli Gallery in New York and in Sperone, Italy. He was the only French artist to be invited to the Zeitgeist at Berlin. Institutional recognition came in 1987, at the CAPC of Bordeaux (Centre d'arts plastiques contemporains de Bordeaux), where he presented a combination of oils on canvas and acrylics on homespun, and then at the Fondation Cartier.

Garouste has executed works and decorations for various endeavors: paintings for the Élysée Palace, sculptures for Évry Cathedral, the ceiling of the theater at Namur, and for the church of Notre-Dame de Talant, stained glass. In 1989, he did the curtain for the Théâtre du Châtelet.

An important step for Garouste was the founding in 1991 of the association The Source, which sets itself the task of helping culturally underprivileged young people to achieve personal development through artistic expression.

He received an order in 1996 for a monumental work for the National Library of France mixing painting and wrought iron. Sculpture and engraving were attracting him more and more, as well as illustration for all sorts of writings, from Don Quixote to the Haggadah.

In 2001, he presented at the Fondation Cartier Ellipse, an arrangement of canvasses mounted on a construction of his own design.

Gérard Garouste was elected on December 13, 2017, to the Academy of Fine Arts to the seat of Georges Mathieu.

== Selected works ==
=== Visual arts ===
- La Mouche
- Ellipse at the Fondation Cartier
- Dante (195x130 cm)
- L'Antipode, oil on canvas (130x90 cm)
- Senza titolo in the "Terrae Motus" collection, at the Royal Palace of Caserta

=== Theater ===
Le Classique et l'Indien, 1977

== Principal individual shows ==
- 1988 : Gérard Garouste at the Musée national d'art moderne in Paris
- 2001 : Ellipse at the Fondation Cartier
- 2002 : Kézive ou la ville mensonge, Daniel Templon Gallery
- 2003 : Saintes ellipses at the Chapelle de la Salpêtrière
- 2004 : Portraits, Galerie Daniel Templon, Paris
- 2005 : La Coupole at the Panthéon
- 2006 : L'Anesse et la Figue, Daniel Templon Gallery, Paris
- 2008 : La Bourgogne, la famille et l'eau tiède, Daniel Templon Gallery, Paris
- 2012 : Walpurgisnacht, Daniel Templon Gallery, Paris
- 2014 : Ineffable Tales, Daniel Templon Gallery, Paris
- 2022 : Gérard Garouste at the Centre_Pompidou, Paris

== Decorations ==
- Officer of the Legion of Honour (2015)
