= Iván Navarro (artist) =

Chilean artist (born 1972)

- Born: 1972 (age 53–54); Santiago, Chile
- Website: www.ivan-navarro.com

Iván Navarro (born 1972 in Santiago, Chile) is a Chilean artist who works with light, mirrors, and glowing glass tubes to craft socially and politically relevant sculptures and installations. As of 2019, he lives and works in Brooklyn, New York.

== Early life and education ==
Navarro was born and raised in Santiago, Chile. The politics and government of his homeland have had a profound impact on his work, both in his choice of media and in the meaning and thought process he portrays in his neon sculptures and faux-furniture. As he grew up during the dictatorship of General Augusto Pinochet, Navarro was used to electricity being shut off to keep citizens at home and isolated; “All the pieces that I’ve made make reference to controlling activity, and electricity was a way to control people.”

His father was a left-leaning dean of a university.

Navarro initially intended to study theatrical set design at Pontifical Catholic University of Chile, but was not accepted by that department, so he studied art instead. He continued to participate informally in design and lighting for theater, and was awarded a BFA degree in 1995.

== Artwork ==
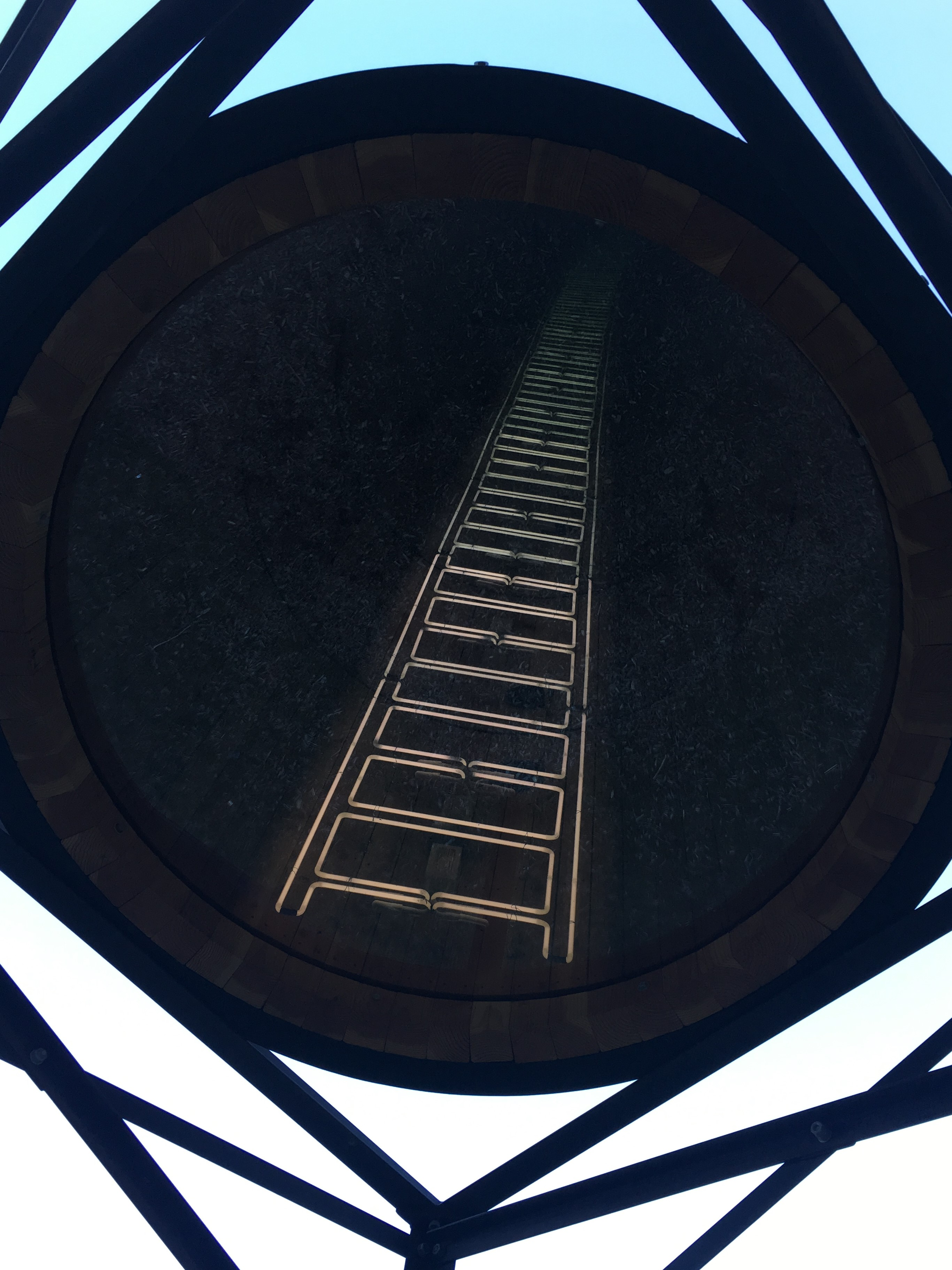
Ladder (Water Tower), 2014, uses neon art and infinity mirrors to produce its visual effects

An example of Navarro's work being steeped in his homeland's history while also speaking to current political debates is his You Sit, You Die, which consists of a lounge chair built from white fluorescent tubes. "'This is my version of the electric chair', the artist explains. Electricity was one of the tools of torture preferred by the Chilean government, but the piece also has local currency. On the paper seat, he has written the names of every individual executed in Florida by electric chair, to bear witness to the state's record on capital punishment."

Navarro also works with light and infinity mirrors, in which viewers lose themselves in an apparently infinite space as neon phrases or structures loom out and suggest what lies beyond. These abyss-like works can link back to Navarro's fear of being abducted as a child. As he navigates his past, the artist readily admits, "There is a certain amount of fear in my pieces". In Criminal Ladder (2005), Navarro created a 30-foot (9.1 m) high ladder made with fluorescent light tubes. On the tubes he has written the names of people who committed human rights abuses during the Pinochet time in power.

He is represented by Galerie Daniel Templon.

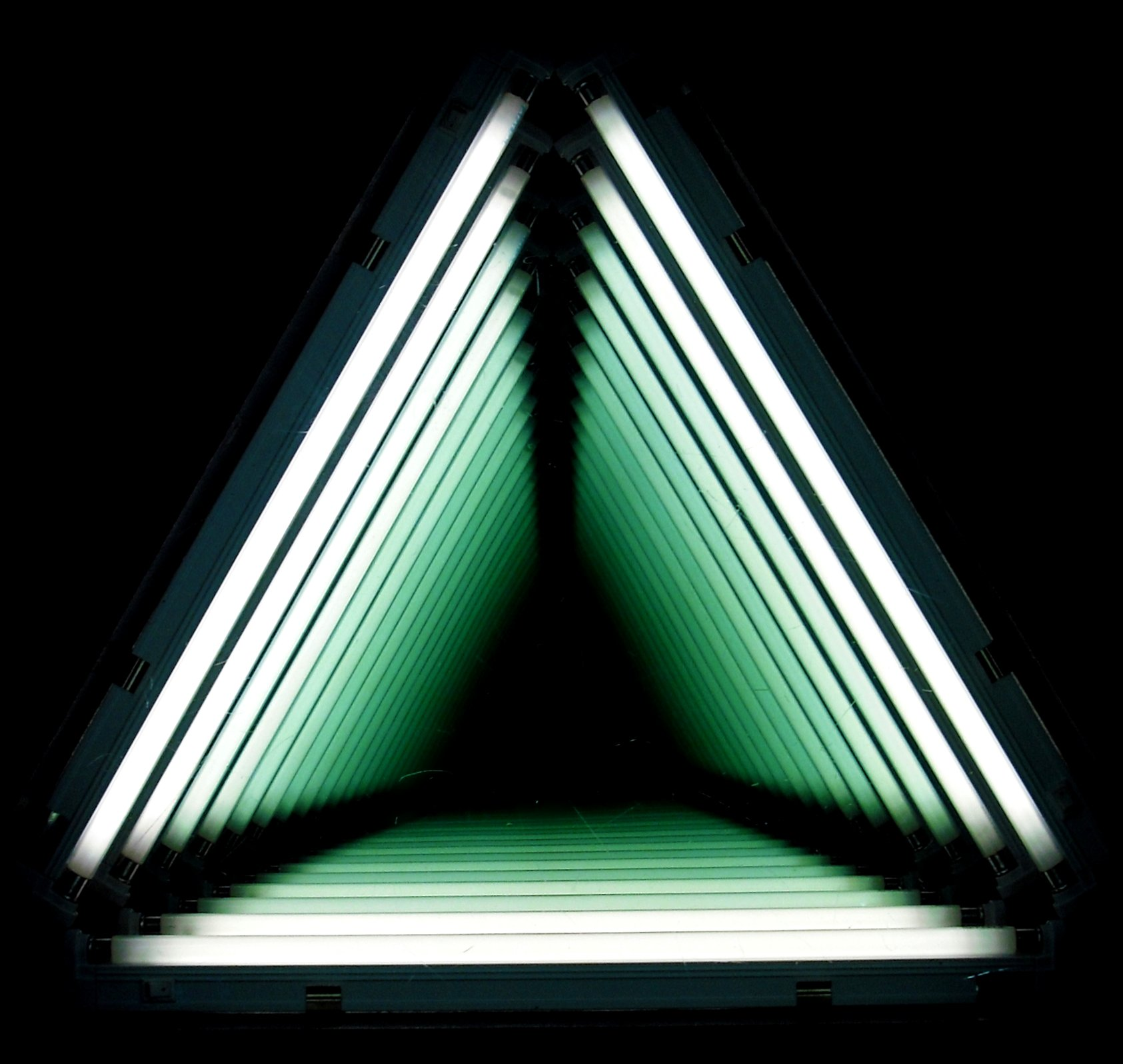
Die Again (Monument for Tony Smith) (2019)

== Selected exhibitions and works ==
- 2019
  - MACBA, Buenos Aires, Argentina
  - This Land is Your Land, currently installed at Navy Pier, Chicago, Illinois (July 27, 2018 - September 30, 2019)
- 2018
  - Prostutopia, Galerie Templon, Brussels
  - Hangang Art Park Creation Project, Seoul, Korea
  - Podium, Galerie Templon
- 2017
  - Fanfare, Galerie Daniel Templon, Paris Rue Beauborg
  - Untitled, The Nelson Atkins Museum of Art, Kansas City, MO USA
- 2016
  - Summer Sculpture Exhibition, Paul Kasmin Gallery
  - Mute Parade, Paul Kasmin Gallery
  - Vigilantes, Museo del Hongo, Museo de Arte Contemporáneo de Valdivia
- 2014
  - Nacht und Nebel, Galerie Daniel Templon, Brussels
  - This Land is Your Land, originally installed at Madison Square Park, New York (February 20, 2014 - April 20, 2014)
- 2013
  - Where is the Next War?, Galerie Daniel Templon, Paris
- 2012
  - Impenetrables, Art Kabinett, Paul Kasmin Gallery, Art Basel, Miami
  - Iván Navarro: Fluorescent Light Sculptures, Frost Museum of Art, Miami
  - Heaven or Las Vegas, SCAD Museum of Art, Savannah, Georgia, US
  - Nacht und Nebel, Fondazione Volume!, Rome
- 2011
  - UNO Fence, Prospect.2 at UNO Gallery, New Orleans
  - The Armory Fence, Paul Kasmin Gallery at the Armory Show, New York
  - Heaven or Las Vegas, Paul Kasmin Gallery, New York
- 2010
  - Tener Dolor en el Cuerpo de Otro, Distrito 4, Madrid
  - Tierra de Nadie, Caja De Burgos, Burgos, Spain
  - Missing, Chambre Blanche, Manif d´art 5, Catastrophe?, Quebec, Canada
- 2009
  - Die, Paul Kasmin Gallery, New York
  - Nowhere Man, Galerie Daniel Templon, Paris
  - Threshold, 53rd Biennale di Venezia, Chilean Pavilion, Venice
  - Nowhere Man, Contemporary Art Center Towner, Eastbourne, UK
- 2008
  - Antifurniture, Galerie Daniel Templon, Paris
- 2006
  - Spy Glass, Galerie Daniel Templon, Paris
- 2004
  - Juice sucker, CSPS Legion Arts, Iowa, USA
  - Monuments for D. Flavin, Roebling Hall, Brooklyn, USA
- 2002
  - Blade runner, Gasworks Studios, London, UK
- 2001
  - Big Bang, Galería Animal, Santiago, Chile
- 1996
  - Camping day, PUC, Santiago, Chile

== Selected collections ==
- Hirshhorn Museum and Sculpture Garden, Washington DC
- Virginia Museum of Fine Arts, Richmond, Virginia
- Boston Museum of Fine Arts, Boston
- Fonds National d’Art Contemporain, Paris
- Towner Contemporary Art Museum, Eastbourne, UK
- LVMH Collection, Paris
- Saatchi Collection, London
- Martin Z. Margulies Warehouse, Miami
- Centro Galego de Arte Contemporanea, Santiago de Compostela, Spain
- Solomon R. Guggenheim Museum, New York
- Vanhaerents Art Collection, Brussels
