= Taylor Davis (artist) =

American artist & teacher (born 1959)

- Born: 1959 (age 66–67); Palm Springs, California, US
- Education: BSEd, Tufts University; DFA, School of the Museum of Fine Arts; MFA, Bard College
- Known for: Sculpture, Painting
- Website: taylordavis.net

Taylor Davis (born 1959) is an American artist. She is best known for her innovative wood sculptures.

== Early life and education ==
Davis was born in Palm Springs, California, and grew up in the state of Washington.

Davis earned a Diploma of Fine Arts at the School of the Museum of Fine Arts; a Bachelor of Science degree in Education at Tufts University; and a Master of Fine Arts degree from the Milton Avery Graduate School of the Arts at Bard College.

== Career ==
Davis has been a professor at the Massachusetts College of Art and Design since 1999, and is also the co-chair of the sculpture program at Milton Avery Graduate School of the Arts at Bard College. In fall 2008, she was visiting faculty member at the Department of Visual and Environmental Studies at Harvard University.

Her work has been widely shown across the United States, and Davis was included in the Whitney Biennial in 2004. Davis is represented by DODGEgallery, in New York City.

== Artwork ==
Davis incorporates commonplace industrial and construction materials into her work, sometimes with a rough finish (such as pieces of wood with the bark still attached), but often with a fine craftsmanlike finish and precision joinery. Even though her raw materials are everyday, mundane materials, she often sorts carefully through them, looking for the ideal wood grain or texture.

Much of Davis' best-known sculpture has been constructed from wood elements, such as 2x4 dimensional lumber, plywood, or wood moldings. For example, her Untitled (2001), in the permanent collection of the ICA Boston, has been compared to a shipping pallet, a garden gate, or a livestock enclosure. It is meticulously constructed of clear-grain pine, and conceals infinity mirrors inside, which reveal an infinite visual space within a simple everyday structure.

Davis has also exhibited non-sculptural artwork, including collages and works on canvas.

== Grants and awards ==
- 1999 Massachusetts Cultural Council Grant
- 2001 Institute of Contemporary Art Artist Prize
- 2002 Association of International Art Critics Award
- 2003 St Botolph Foundation Grant
- 2007 Association of International Art Critics Award
- 2010–2011 residential fellowship at the Radcliffe Institute for Advanced Study at Harvard University

== Publications ==
Berrigan, Anselm (2018). Taylor Davis : selected works 1996-2018 / [editor: Anselm Berrigan]. Arbor Press. ISBN 9780578508467.
