= Infinity mirror =

Parallel or angled mirrors reflecting each other

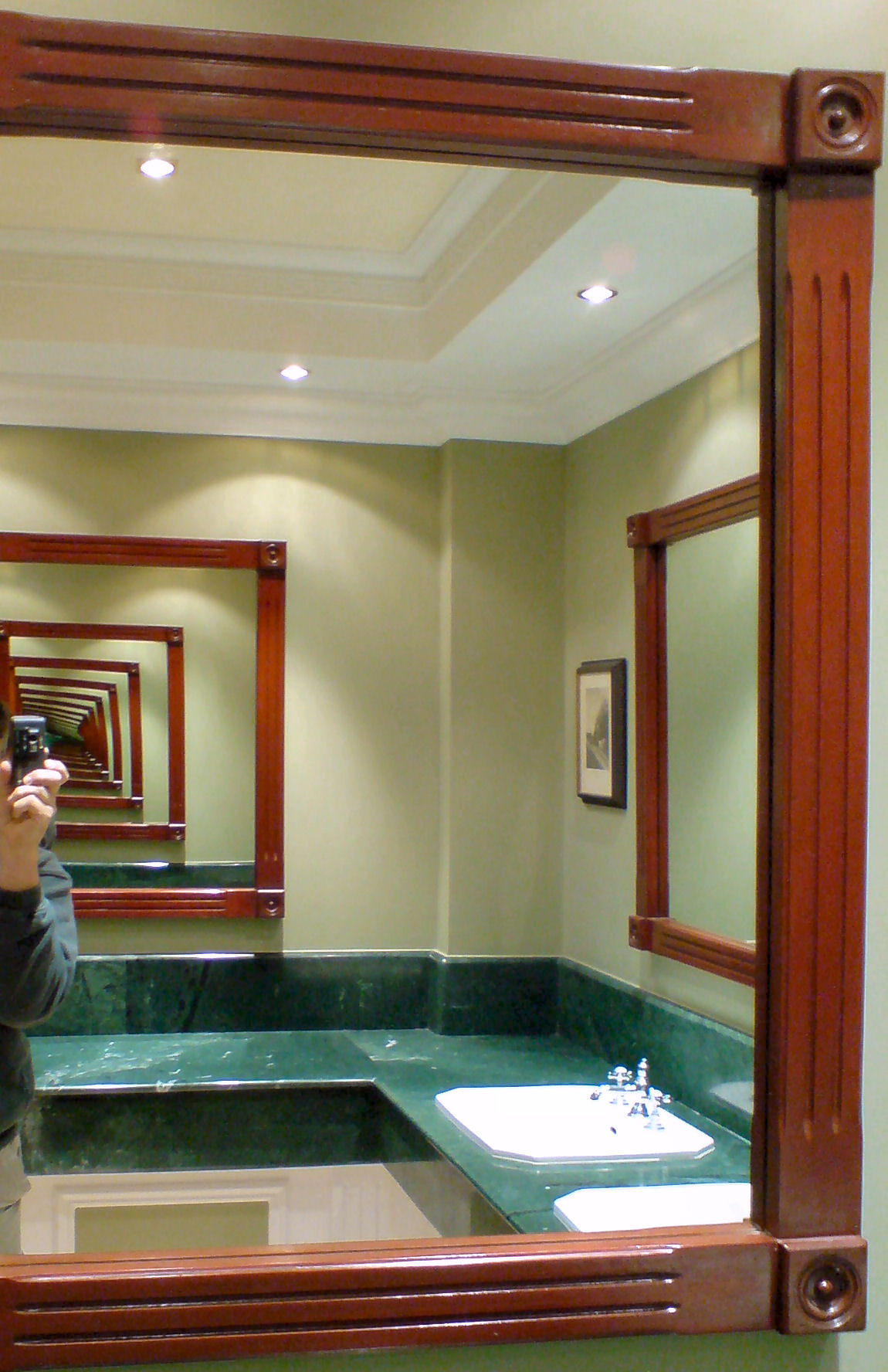
An infinity mirror effect viewed between paired mirrors in a public bathroom

The infinity mirror (also sometimes called an infinite mirror) is a configuration of two or more parallel or angled mirrors, which are arranged to create a series of further and further reflections that appear to recede to infinity. The front mirror of an infinity mirror is often half-silvered (a one way mirror), but this is not required to produce the effect. A similar appearance in artworks has been called the Droste effect. Infinity mirrors are sometimes used as room accents or in works of art.

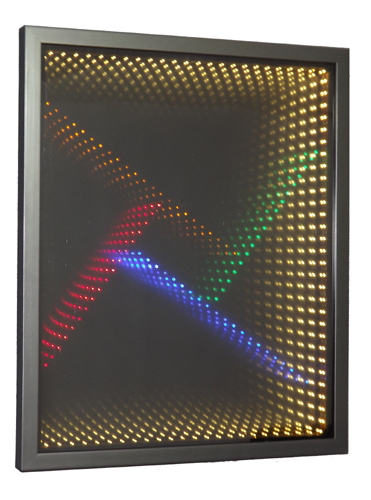
A self-contained infinity mirror used as a wall decoration

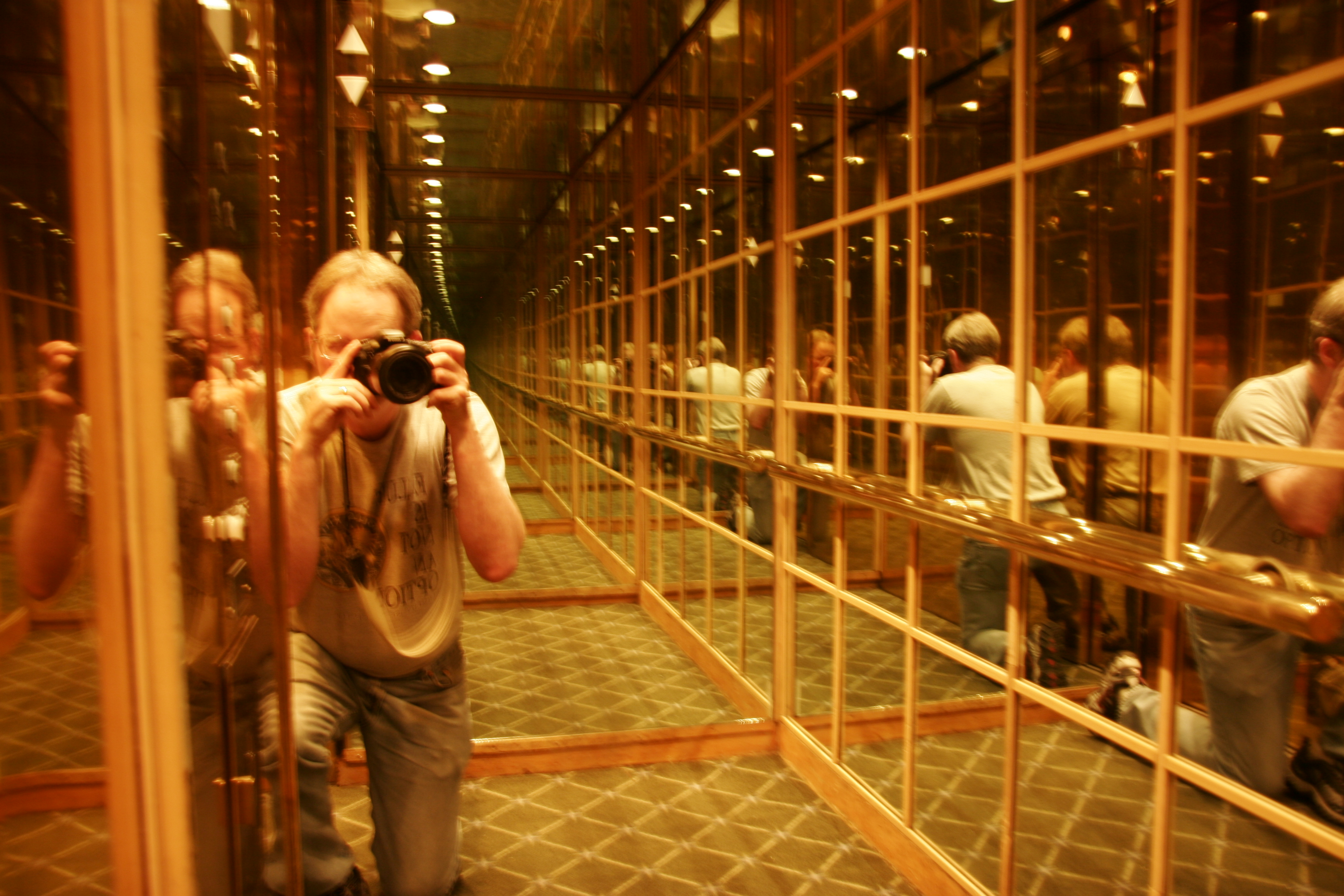
Infinity mirror effects can extend in two directions with additional mirrors that are at 90 degrees.

In a classic self-contained infinity mirror, a set of light bulbs, LEDs, or other point-source lights are placed around the periphery of a fully reflective mirror, and a second, partially reflective "one-way mirror" is placed a short distance in front of it, in a parallel alignment. When an outside observer looks into the surface of the partially reflective mirror, the lights appear to recede into infinity, creating the appearance of a tunnel of great depth that is lined with lights. If the mirrors are not precisely parallel, but instead are canted at a slight angle, the "visual tunnel" will be perceived to be curved off to one side, as it recedes into infinity.

Alternatively, this effect can also be seen when an observer stands between two parallel fully reflective mirrors, as in various dressing rooms, some elevators, or a house of mirrors. A weaker version of this effect can be seen by standing between any two parallel reflective surfaces, such as the glass walls of a small entry lobby into some buildings. The partially-reflective glass produces this sensation, diluted by the visual noise of the views through the glass into the surrounding environment. Similar reflective and lighting concepts are also used in contemporary illuminated mirror designs, where LED lighting and layered reflective surfaces create depth effects in decorative mirrors.

== Explanation of effect ==
Explanation of an infinity mirror – dashed rays depicts the virtual scene as seen by the eye, showing that objects are alternately flipped

The 3D illusion mirror effect is produced whenever there are two parallel reflective surfaces which can bounce a beam of light back and forth an indefinite (theoretically infinite) number of times. The reflections appear to recede into the distance because the light actually is traversing the distance it appears to be traveling. The reflections may also appear to dim in the distance because the mirrors absorb some of the light and do not reflect all of it.

For example, in a two-centimeter-thick infinity mirror, with the light sources halfway between, light from the source initially travels one centimeter. The first reflection travels one centimeter to the rear mirror and then two centimeters to, and through the front mirror, a total of three centimeters. The second reflection travels two centimeters from front mirror to back mirror, and again two centimeters from the back mirror to, and through the front mirror, totaling four centimeters, plus the first reflection (three centimeters) making the second reflection seven centimeters away from the front mirror. Each successive reflection adds four more centimeters to the total (the third reflection appears 11 centimeters deep, fourth 15 centimeters, and so on).

Each additional reflection adds length to the path the light must travel before exiting the mirror and reaching the viewer. Reflection of the light also reduces the brightness of the image due to impurities in the glass. For example, most mirrors use glass with small amounts of iron oxide impurities, giving the reflection a slightly dim green tinge. Across multiple reflections, the brightness reduces further and further, and is tinted more and more green. However, mirrors used for infinity mirrors are ideally front silvered and these suffer from lower losses as the light does not travel through glass except when it finally escapes.

== Cultural references ==
An early reference to an infinity mirror is found in the history of Chinese Buddhism, where the Huayan Patriarch Fazang (643–712) is said to have illustrated the "tenfold" precedent of the Huayan Jing by placing ten mirrors around a statue of the Buddha—eight mirrors in an octagon, with additional mirrors on the floor and ceiling. When he lit a torch, its light and the illuminated Buddha were reflected within reflections around the room.

Visual artists, especially contemporary sculptors, have made use of infinity mirrors. Yayoi Kusama, Josiah McElheny, Ivan Navarro, Taylor Davis, Anthony James, Guillaume Lachapelle, and Hugh Hayden have all produced works that use the infinity mirror to expand the sensation of unlimited space in their artworks.

The contemporary classical composer Arvo Pärt wrote his 1978 composition Spiegel im Spiegel ("mirror in the mirror") as a musical reflection on the infinity mirror effect.

== See also ==
- Corner reflector – Retroreflector with three orthogonal, intersecting flat surfaces
- Droste effect – Recursive visual effect
- Kaleidoscope – Optical instrument to view patterns due to repeated reflection
- Mirror image – Reflected duplication of an object
- Optical cavity – Arrangement of mirrors
- Recursion § In art
- Video feedback – Visual effect created by a camera recording its own live monitor output
