= Transports de l'Agglomération de Montpellier =

Tramway network map

Transports de l'agglomération de Montpellier (TaM) is the public transport company in Montpellier, France and its agglomeration.

TaM operates five tram lines, buses (42 lines), the shared bicycle scheme Vélomagg'. TaM is a partner of Transdev, which operates 26 bus lines, including the 6 on-demand lines of Montpellier's bus network.

== History ==
The company was constituted in 2000 as a successor to the Société montpelliéraine de transport urbain (SMTU), founded in 1978, which is also a successor of the Compagnie Montpelliéraine des Transports (CMT).

TaM succeeded to the SMTU back when the first tram line of Montpellier started operation.
