= Faurschou =

Faurschou is a surname. Notable people with the surname include:

- David Faurschou (born 1956), politician in Manitoba, Canada
- Jesper Faurschou (born 1983), Danish athlete
- Jens Faurschou (born 1960), Copenhagen-based art collector and art advisor

See also:

- Bent Faurschou Hviid (1921–1944), member of the Danish resistance group Holger Danske during World War II
