= Élisabeth Garouste =

French interior designer (born 1946)

Élizabeth Garouste (born 17 July 1946) is a French interior designer.

The daughter of Russian immigrants Salomon and Blima Rochline, she was born Élizabeth Catherine Rochline in Paris, was educated at the Académie Charpentier and studied interior design at the École Camondo. In 1970, she married painter Gérard Garouste.

Garouste designed theatre sets for Jean-Michel Ribes. She later went on to work with Mattia Bonetti to design furniture; their designs have appeared in museums including the Victoria and Albert Museum, the Centre Georges Pompidou, the Musée des arts décoratifs et du design de Bordeaux and the Guggenheim Museum, They were awarded the Prix Créateurs at the Salon International du Meuble in Paris.

Garouste also has collaborated with other designers such as Christian Lacroix and Nina Ricci and designs glassware and wallpaper.

Garouste received the Trophée des femmes en or in 1993.
