= PingPod =

Table tennis venue company

PingPod Inc.
- Founded: July 31, 2019; 5 years ago in New York City, New York, United States
- Founders: David Silberman, Ernesto Ebuen, Max Kogler
- Headquarters: New York City, United States
- Key people: Max Kogler (Co-Founder, CEO) David Silberman (Co-Founder, CFO) Ernesto Ebuen (Co-Founder) Ilya Rivkin (CTO) Ben Borton (Chief Strategy Officer)
- Services: Table tennis clubs
- Website: http://pingpod.com/

PingPod is a company that runs table tennis venues, nicknamed "pods." Most pods are operational 24/7 and operate without on-site employees.

== History ==
David Silberman conceived of the idea and pitched it to two individuals: Ernesto Ebuen, a former U.S. table tennis player who took on the role of Chief Product Officer, and Max Kogler, a former Goldman Sachs employee and businessman, who joined as the CEO. PingPod's first location was opened in 2020 on the Lower East Side in New York City.

== Features ==
Locations are equipped with features like automated scorekeeping and the capability to replay moments in a match, called PodPlay. PodPlay licenses its reservation management software and instant replay and scoreboard system to other venue operators, namely in the pickleball space.

== Locations ==
PingPod runs several locations across most of New York City, Brooklyn, New Jersey, Philadelphia, Boston, Chicago, Miami, as well as internationally in Bristol, UK and the Philippines.
