= Philippidès Stadium =

French university sports stadium

Stade Philippidès
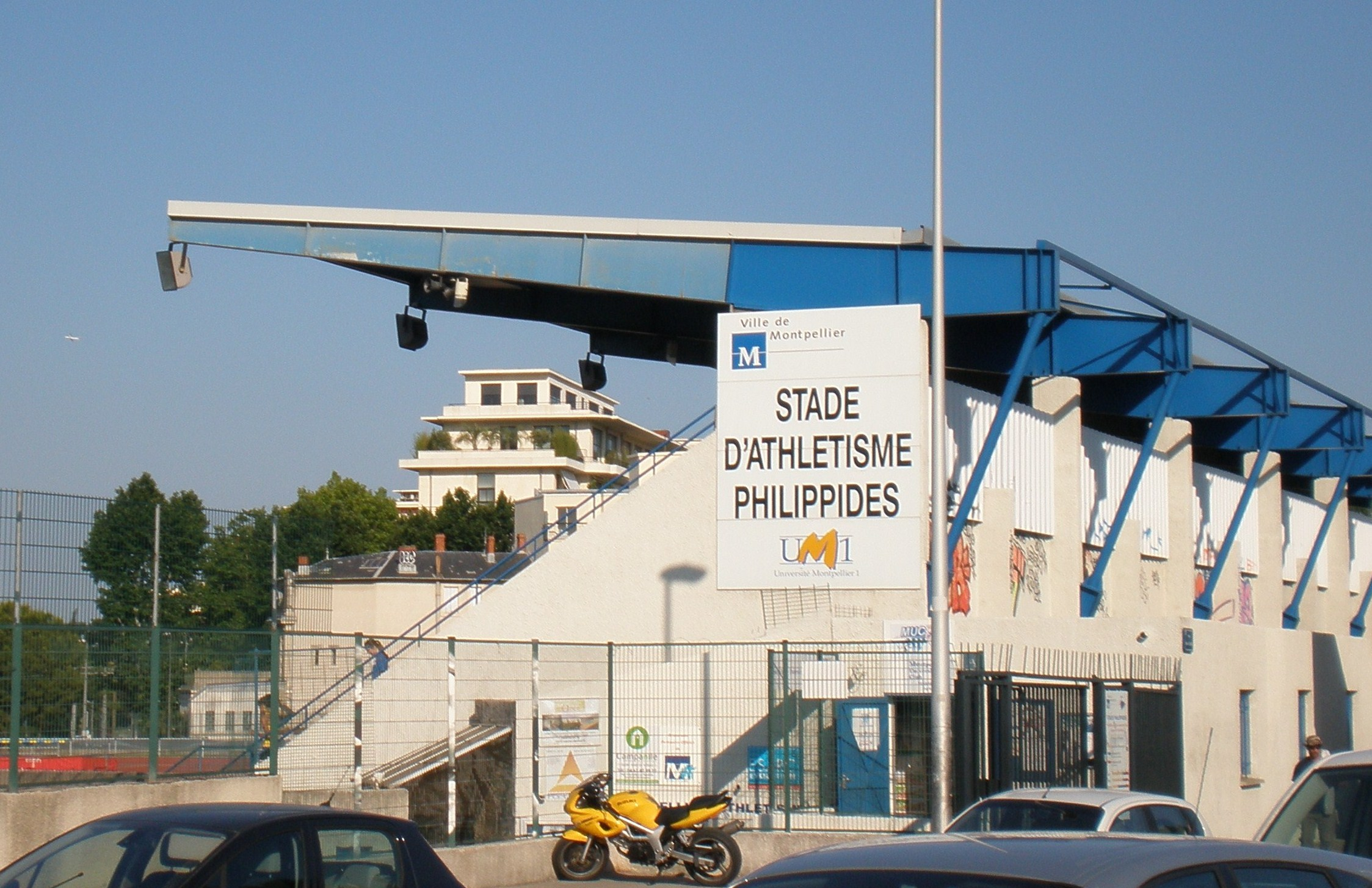

- Location within France
- Address: 542, rue Auguste Broussonnet 34000 Montpellier, France
- Coordinates: 43.617°N 3.868°E
- Owner: Université de Montpellier
- Capacity: 1200 places
- Surface: Track : synthetic.

Construction
- Built: October 1985-June 1988

Tenants
- Montpellier Agglomération Athletic Méditerranée

The Philippidès Stadium is the main athletics stadium of the City of Montpellier, France. It belongs to the University of Montpellier and is primarily used as a place of education for the UFR STAPS.

The management of the stadium is done, by convention, (under the form of AOT), to the university for educational use during week days and then by the city of Montpellier for nights and weekends, during which the town organises maintenance, caretaking, the opening of athletic clubs, and also access to the public.

== Description ==
Inaugurated in 1988 to equip the UFR STAPS and the CREPS Montpellier with an infrastructure for athletics and has a Grandstand of 1,200 places. Its playground consists of a central grassed area of 9,200 m^{2} (99,000 sq ft) surrounded by a 400 m (1,300 ft) Athletics track with eight lanes.

The Philippidès stadium is equipped to hold international events and has already hosted several, such as the Montpellier Marathon and the university championships of France. It has also served as a training base for many athletes preparing for national and European competitions. Even globally-ranked athletes (sprinters of the team of France) have used the facility. It is also used as the permanent training center for combined sporting events.

At the end of 2011 and into early 2012, the track was completely renovated (the surface was renovated, the corridors were added, the practice area for javelin and long jump was increased) and a flexible jogging track of 550 meters was added.
