= StudioMDA =

American architecture firm

studioMDA
- Type: Private company
- Industry: Design
- Headquarters: Manhattan, New York
- Key people: Markus Dochantschi,
- Number of employees: 18
- Website: studiomda.com

studioMDA is an architecture and design firm founded in New York City in 2002 by architect Markus Dochantschi. The firm works across residential, commercial, cultural, institutional, and mixed-use projects in the United States and internationally. It is particularly known for designing galleries, exhibition spaces, and other projects for the contemporary art world.

== History and Practice ==
studioMDA was established by Dochantschi in 2002 as a multidisciplinary practice encompassing architecture, interior design, exhibition design, master planning, and urban design. The firm has completed projects throughout the United States and in countries including Sweden, Switzerland, Germany, Chile, Democratic Republic of the Congo, United Kingdom, Turkey, Thailand, South Korea, and the United Arab Emirates. studioMDAwork ranges from private residences and commercial buildings to educational facilities, cultural institutions, and adaptive-reuse projects. Larger completed works include the Phillips headquarters in New York City, completed in 2021, and the Center for Advanced Mobility in Aachen, Germany, completed in 2022, among others.

== Cultural and exhibition work ==
A substantial part of studioMDA’s practice has focused on architecture for contemporary art. Over more than two decades, the firm has designed more than 40 galleries in New York City. Its gallery projects include spaces for Marian Goodman Gallery, David Nolan Gallery, Nahmad Contemporary, Edward Tyler Nahem Fine Art, Kasmin Gallery, Karma, Esther Schipper, Dirimart, and Matthew Brown Gallery. The firm has also designed art exhibitions, several art fairs, and about 250 art-fair booths, including Art Basel, Art Basel Miami Beach, Art Basel Hong Kong, TEFAF, Frieze, FIAC, The Armory Show, EXPO CHICAGO, ZONAMACO. Furthermore, studioMDA's gallery and exhibition work was published by Hatje Cantz, studioMDA: Space for Art in 2026.

== Selected Projects ==
=== Galleries ===
- 60 White, NY, U.S.
- Alexander Gray Associates, NY, U.S.
- Faurschou New York, NY, U.S.
- Kasmin Gallery, NY, U.S.
- Marian Goodman Gallery, NY, U.S.
- Matthew Brown Gallery, LA, U.S.
- Nino Mier Gallery, SoHo, NY, U.S.
- Nino Mier Gallery, Tribeca, NY, U.S.
- Print Center New York, NY, U.S.
- Timothy Taylor, NY, U.S.

=== Art Fairs ===
- Art Basel
- Art Basel Miami Beach
- Art Basel Hong Kong
- Frieze
- TEFAF
- The Armory Show

=== Exhibitions ===
- Jean-Michel Basquiat, Nahmad Contemporary, NY, U.S.

=== Residential ===
- 137 Franklin Street, New York, U.S.
- West Village Townhouse, New York, U.S.
- Anchorage Residence, Anchorage, Alaska, U.S.

=== Institutional Projects ===
- Center for Advanced Mobility, Aachen, Germany
- GMF Congo School, Kaleka, Democratic Republic of the Congo
- Raising Malawi, Malawi

=== Commercial Projects ===
- Phillips Southampton, Southampton, New York, U.S
- PingPod, NY, U.S.

== Awards and Recognition ==
- 2026 – Architizer A+ Award for Marian Goodman Gallery.
- 2025 – The Architect's Newspaper Best of Design Awards, Honorable Mention, for Marian Goodman Gallery.
- 2025 – German Design Award for the Center for Advanced Mobility.
- 2024 – iF Design Award in the Architecture – Institutional category for the Center for Advanced Mobility.
