= Mattia Bonetti =

Swiss artist

- Born: 1952 (age 72–73); Lugano, Switzerland
- Education: Centro Scolastico per l’Industria Artistica, Lugano
- Known for: Design

Mattia Bonetti (born 1952) is a Paris-based artist and designer. Bonetti was born in Lugano, Switzerland, and studied textile design at the Centro Scolastico per l’Industria Artistica. Bonetti moved from Switzerland to Paris, where he now lives and works. Prior to designing furniture, Bonetti worked as a stylist and photographer. In 1979, he began designing furniture. All of his work begins as a freehand sketch, which is then fabricated. Bonetti has worked with the same fabricators for decades, employing craftsmen to transform his drawings.

For the booth of Paul Kasmin Gallery at the 2015 edition of TEFAF Maastricht, Bonetti was responsible for the design of the entire display, which also included the wooden floors, upholstered chairs, and tables, and designed wallpaper based on one of his watercolours.

== Selected solo exhibitions ==
- 2017: "New Works," David Gill Gallery, London (June, upcoming)
- 2014: "New Works," David Gill Gallery, London
- 2013: "Indoor, Outdoor," Paul Kasmin Gallery, New York
- 2012: "New Works," David Gill Gallery, London
- 2011: Duke & Duke, Los Angeles
- 2010: "New York," Paul Kasmin Gallery, New York
- 2008: "New Works," David Gill Gallery, London
- 2008: Galerie Cat-Berros, Paris
- 2004: "New Works," David Gill Gallery, London

== Public collections ==
Mattia Bonetti's work is included in the collections of the Le Centre Georges Pompidou, Paris; Musée des Arts Décoratifs, Paris; Seibu Museum, Tokyo; Kunstmuseum, Düsseldorf, Germany; Le Grand Hornu, Belgium; Cooper-Hewitt Museum, New York, the Museum of Carcassonne, among many others.

== Selected press ==
- Wyma, Chloe, "'I Refuse to Classify': Mattia Bonetti on Blurring Boundaries in Design," ArtInfo, 04/15/13.
- Zara, Janelle, "Artist-Designer Equivocally Launches a New Collection at Paul Kasmin," ArtInfo, 04/03/13.
- Green, Penelope, "Mattia Bonetti's Loud Furniture," The New York Times, 02/17/13.
- 'Lucia Van der Post, Mattia of Importance, Financial Times, June 5, 2012.
- Nicole Swengley, Mattia Bonetti at David Gill, Financial Times, How to Spend It, June 25, 2014.
