= 2026–27 Turkish Women's Football Super League =

Turkish Women's Football Super League
- Season: 2026–27
- Dates: 29 August 2026 – 23 May 2027
- Matches: 87
- Goals: 365 (4.2 per match)
- Top goalscorer: Armisa Kuč; Cristina Martín-Prieto (17 goals)
- Biggest home win: ABB Fomget 23–0 Giresun Sanayi (6 September 2026)
- Biggest away win: Giresun Sanayi 0–13 Yüksekova (24 October 2026)
- Highest scoring: ABB Fomget 23–0 Giresun Sanayi (6 September 2026)
- Longest winning run: 6 matches ABB Fomget
- Longest unbeaten run: 11 matches Trabzonspor
- Longest winless run: 11 matches Giresun Sanayi
- Longest losing run: 11 matches Giresun Sanayi
- All statistics correct as of 15 November 2026.

The 2026–27 Turkish Women's Football Super League (Turkish: Suwen Kadın Futbol Süper Ligi 2026–2027 Sezonu) is the 31st season of Turkey's top women's football league.

A total of 16 teams, 13 from the 2025–26 Women's Super League season and three from the 2025–26 Women's Football First League season, compete in a round-robin format. The season began on 29 August 2026 and will end in May 2027.

== Teams ==
Location of teams in Turkey in the 2026–27 season of Turkish Women's Football Super League
Location of teams in Istanbul in the 2026–27 season of Turkish Women's Football Super League

Season 2026–27
Team	Hometown	Ground	Capacity	2025–26 finish
1207 Antalya Spor	Antalya	Zeytinköy Stadium's Field #3		13th
Amed	Diyarbakır	Diyarbakır Stadium	33,000	7th
Bakırköy	Istanbul (Bakırköy)	Bakırköy Municipality Stadium		Champions (First League)
Beşiktaş	Istanbul (Beşiktaş)	İBB GOP Halit Kıvanç City Stadium	5,000	6th
Fenerbahçe	Istanbul (Kadıköy)	Fenerbahçe Lefter Küçükandonyadis Stadium	200	Champions
ABB Fomget	Ankara	Osmanlı Stadium	18,029	4th
Giresun Sanayi	Giresun	Giresun 75. Yıl Futbol Sahası		10th
Galatasaray	Istanbul (Sarıyer)	Florya Metin Oktay Facilities		3rd
Hakkarigücü	Hakkari	Merzan City Football Field		8th
Haymana	Ankara (Haymana)	Haymana City Stadium		Play-off winners (First League)
Kayseri	Kayseri	Sümer Football Field		Runners-up (First League)
Sultanbeyli Gücü	Istanbul (Sultanbeyli)	Belediye 100. Yıl Stadium		12th
Şile BilgiDoğa	Istanbul (Şile)	Şile District Stadium		11th
Trabzonspor	Trabzon	Mehmet Ali Yılmaz Stadium	3,000	2nd
Ünye Kadın	Ordu (Ünye)	Ünye District Stadium	10,340	9th
Yüksekova	Hakkari (Yüksekova)	Yüksekova District Stadium	1,000	5th

=== Personnel and kits ===
Team	Manager	Captain	Kit manufacturer	Main shirt sponsor
1207 Antalya Spor	(Turkey) Hüseyin Türk	(Turkey) Beyza Emine Saruhan	Hummel	Puding Hotel
ABB Fomget	(Turkey) Cumali Enginar	(Montenegro) Armisa Kuč	Adidas	Natura Dünyası
Amed	(Turkey) Seyid Ahmet Hafız	(Turkey) Sema Polat	Nike	
Bakırköy	(Turkey) Serkan Güzeler	(Turkey) Sibel Duman	Umbro	
Beşiktaş	(Turkey) Didem Karagenç	(Turkey) Selda Akgöz	Nike	
Fenerbahçe	(Turkey) Gökhan Bozkaya	(Turkey) Yağmur Uraz	Adidas	arsaVev
Giresun Sanayi	(Turkey) Yüksel Yeşilova	(Turkey) İlayda Akdeniz	Hummel	Prolift Elevator
Galatasaray	(Turkey) Şaban Uzun	(Turkey) Ebru Topçu	Puma	
Hakkarigücü	(Turkey) Cemile Timur	(Cameroon) Kevine Ossol	Hummel	Spor Toto
Haymana	(Turkey) Erkan Öztürk	(Ghana) Princess Owusu	Hummel	
Kayseri	(Turkey) Enes Karakaya	(Nigeria) Kafayat Bashiru	Kappa	arsaVev
Sultanbeyli Gücü	(Turkey) Çağdaş Töre	(Turkey) Şehriban Dülek	Nike	YLD Sigorta
Şile BilgiDoğa	(Turkey) Mihrican Ocaktan	(Turkey) İlayda Pınar	Adidas	
Trabzonspor	(Turkey) Bahar Özgüvenç	(Turkey) Fatma Kara	Joma	
Ünye Kadın	(Turkey) Ceren Konar Yılmaz	(Turkey) Nagehan Akşan	Puma	SAFİ MCL Bentonite
Yüksekova	(Turkey) Bayram Yıldırım	(Turkey) Bahar Kol	Adidas	Töre A.Ş.

== League table ==
Pos	Team	Pld	W	D	L	GF	GA	GD	Pts	Qualification or relegation
1	Fenerbahçe	9	8	1	0	39	1	+38	25	Qualification for the Champions League second qualifying round
2	Galatasaray	11	7	3	1	50	6	+44	24	Qualification for the Europa Cup first qualifying round
3	Beşiktaş	11	7	3	1	23	7	+16	24	
4	ABB Fomget	11	7	2	2	52	10	+42	23	
5	Trabzonspor	10	6	4	0	28	4	+24	22	
6	Hakkarigücü	11	6	4	1	19	6	+13	22	
7	Yüksekova	10	4	5	1	24	5	+19	17	
8	Kayseri	10	4	3	3	20	16	+4	15	
9	Amed	11	4	1	6	17	16	+1	13	
10	Sultanbeyli Gücü	11	4	1	6	22	29	−7	13	
11	Ünye Kadın	10	3	3	4	15	14	+1	12	
12	Haymana	11	2	4	5	24	26	−2	10	
13	1207 Antalya	11	2	3	6	13	30	−17	9	
14	Bakırköy	11	1	1	9	11	30	−19	1 (Note: Bakırköy Kadın were deducted 3 points by the decision of the Federation.)	Relegation to the First League
15	Şile BilgiDoğa	11	1	0	10	6	84	−78	0 (Note: Şile BilgiDoğa were deducted 3 points by the decision of the Federation.)	Relegation to the First League
16	Giresun Sanayi	11	0	0	11	2	81	−79	0	Relegation to the First League

Updated to match(es) played on 14 November 2026. Source: TFF
Rules for classification: 1) Points; 2) Head-to-head points; 3) Head-to-head goal difference; 4) Head-to-head goals scored; 5) Goal difference; 6) Goals scored; 7) Play-off.

== Season statistics ==
=== Top goalscorers ===
As of 15 November 2026

Rank	Player	Team	Goals
1	(Montenegro) Armisa Kuč	ABB Fomget	17
1	(Spain) Cristina Martín-Prieto	Galatasaray	17
3	(Ghana) Elizabeth Owusuaa	Hakkarigücü	10
4	(South Korea) Song Jae-eun	Trabzonspor	8
4	(Haiti) Laurie-Ann Moïse	Kayseri	8
6	(Czech Republic) Andrea Stašková	Fenerbahçe	7
6	(Turkey) Şehriban Dülek	Sultanbeyli Gücü	7
8	(Brazil) Marta Cintra	Galatasaray	6
8	(Burkina Faso) Rasmata Sawadogo	ABB Fomget	6

=== Hat-tricks and more ===
Player	Sco.	For	Against	Res.	Date	Ref.
(Haiti) Laurie-Ann Moïse	3	Kayseri	Sultanbeyli Gücü	4–3	30 August 2026	
(Montenegro) Armisa Kuč	8	ABB Fomget	Giresun Sanayi	23–0	5 September 2026	
(Belarus) Karina Olkhovik	4	ABB Fomget	Giresun Sanayi	23–0	5 September 2026	
(Turkey) Azra Tıraş	3	Haymana	Şile BilgiDoğa	8–0	6 September 2026	
(Czech Republic) Andrea Stašková	3	Fenerbahçe	Şile BilgiDoğa	12–0	13 September 2026	
(Turkey) Yaşam Göksu	3	Fenerbahçe	Şile BilgiDoğa	12–0	13 September 2026	
(Cameroon) Divine Manga	3	Fenerbahçe	Şile BilgiDoğa	12–0	13 September 2026	
(Spain) Cristina Martín-Prieto	3	Galatasaray	ABB Fomget	6–0	13 September 2026	
(Ghana) Elizabeth Owusuaa	3	Hakkarigücü	1207 Antalya	4–1	20 September 2026	
(Nigeria) Kafayat Atoke Bashiru	3	Kayseri	Şile BilgiDoğa	7–0	26 September 2026	
(Spain) Cristina Martín-Prieto	3	Galatasaray	Amed	4–1	26 September 2026	
(Spain) Cristina Martín-Prieto	5	Galatasaray	Şile BilgiDoğa	22–0	22 October 2026	
(Brazil) Vitória Almeida	4	Galatasaray	Şile BilgiDoğa	22–0	22 October 2026	
(Benin) Aude Gbedjissi	3	Galatasaray	Şile BilgiDoğa	22–0	22 October 2026	
(Turkey) Melike Öztürk	3	Galatasaray	Şile BilgiDoğa	22–0	22 October 2026	
(Serbia) Milica Popović	3	Beşiktaş	Bakırköy	5–2	23 October 2026	
(South Korea) Song Jae-eun	3	Trabzonspor	1207 Antalya	6–1	24 October 2026	
(Montenegro) Armisa Kuč	3	ABB Fomget	Sultanbeyli Gücü	6–0	24 October 2026	
(Turkey) Şehriban Dülek	3	Sultanbeyli Gücü	1207 Antalya Spor	3–3	28 October 2026	
(South Korea) Song Jae-eun	3	Trabzonspor	Amed	4–0	28 October 2026	
(Montenegro) Armisa Kuč	3	ABB Fomget	Şile BilgiDoğa	12–0	28 October 2026	
(Netherlands) Quinty Sabajo	3	ABB Fomget	Şile BilgiDoğa	12–0	28 October 2026	
(North Macedonia) Aleksandra Markovska	3	Haymana	Giresun Sanayi	8–0	28 October 2026	
(Turkey) Mesude Ayont	3	Fenerbahçe	Giresun Sanayi	8–0	1 November 2026	
(Kosovo) Donjeta Halilaj	3	Trabzonspor	Şile BilgiDoğa	7–0	8 November 2026	
(Ghana) Elizabeth Owusuaa	3	Hakkarigücü	Giresun Sanayi	5–1	14 November 2026	
