= 2025–26 in Turkish football =

2025–26 Turkish football season

Football in Turkey
- Season: 2025–26

Men's football
- Süper Lig: Galatasaray
- First League: Erzurumspor
- Turkish Cup: Trabzonspor
- Turkish Super Cup: Fenerbahçe

Women's football
- Women's Super League: Fenerbahçe

The 2025–26 season was the 121st season of competitive football in Turkey.

== National teams ==
=== Turkey men's national football team ===
==== Results and fixtures ====
===== Friendlies =====
7 June 2025 Friendly	United States	1–2	Turkey	East Hartford, United States
15:30 EDT (UTC−04:00)	McGlynn 1'		Güler 24'; Aktürkoğlu 27'	Stadium: Pratt & Whitney Stadium; Attendance: 34,023; Referee: Fernando Morón (Panama)

10 June 2025 Friendly	Mexico	1–0	Turkey	Chapel Hill, United States
20:30 EDT (UTC−04:00)	Pineda 45'	Report		Stadium: Kenan Stadium; Referee: Moeth Gaymes (Saint Vincent and the Grenadines)

1 June 2026 Friendly	Turkey	4−0	North Macedonia	Istanbul, Turkey
20:30 TRT (UTC+03:00)	Kökçü 2'; Uzun 16'; Gül 53'; Yılmaz 70'	Report		Stadium: Şükrü Saracoğlu Stadium; Attendance: 33,994; Referee: José Luis Munuera Montero (Spain)

6 June 2026 Friendly	Venezuela	1–2	Turkey	Fort Lauderdale, United States
18:00 EDT (UTC−04:00)	Mendoza 13'	Report	Yılmaz 44'; Akgün 54'	Stadium: Inter Miami CF Stadium; Referee: Daniel Quintero (Mexico)

==== 2026 FIFA World Cup qualification ====
===== Group E =====
Pos	Team	Pld	W	D	L	GF	GA	GD	Pts	Qualification	(Spain national football team)	(Turkey national football team)	(Georgia national football team)	(Bulgaria national football team)
1	Spain	6	5	1	0	21	2	+19	16	Qualification for 2026 FIFA World Cup	—	2–2	2–0	4–0
2	Turkey	6	4	1	1	17	12	+5	13	Advance to play-offs	0–6	—	4–1	2–0
3	Georgia	6	1	0	5	7	15	−8	3		0–4	2–3	—	3–0
4	Bulgaria	6	1	0	5	3	19	−16	3		0–3	1–6	2–1	—

Source: FIFA, UEFA

4 September 2025	Georgia	2–3	Turkey	Tbilisi, Georgia
20:00 GET (UTC+04:00)	Davitashvili 63'; Kvaratskhelia 90+8'	Report	Müldür 3'; Aktürkoğlu 41', 52'	Stadium: Boris Paichadze National Stadium; Attendance: 44,238; Referee: Davide Massa (Italy)

7 September 2025	Turkey	0–6	Spain	Konya, Turkey
21:45 TRT (UTC+03:00)		Report	Pedri 6', 62'; Merino 22', 45+1', 57'; Torres 53'	Stadium: Konya Metropolitan Municipality Stadium; Attendance: 32,059; Referee: Michael Oliver (England)

11 October 2025	Bulgaria	1–6	Turkey	Sofia, Bulgaria
21:45 EEST (UTC+03:00)	Kirilov 13'	Report	Güler 11'; Popov 49' (o.g.); Yıldız 51', 56'; Çelik 65'; Kahveci 90+3'	Stadium: Vasil Levski National Stadium; Attendance: 10,059; Referee: Luis Godinho (Portugal)

14 October 2025	Turkey	4–1	Georgia	İzmit, Turkey
21:45 TRT (UTC+03:00)	Yıldız 14'; Demiral 22', 52'; Akgün 35'	Report	Kochorashvili 64'	Stadium: Kocaeli Stadium; Attendance: 26,633; Referee: Radu Petrescu (Romania)

15 November 2025	Turkey	2–0	Bulgaria	Bursa, Turkey
20:00 TRT (UTC+03:00)	Çalhanoğlu 18' (pen.); Chernev 83' (o.g.)	Report		Stadium: Centennial Atatürk Stadium; Attendance: 42,756; Referee: Nick Walsh (Scotland)

18 November 2025	Spain	2–2	Turkey	Albacete, Spain
20:45 CET (UTC+01:00)	Olmo 4'; Oyarzabal 62'	Report	Gül 42'; Özcan 54'	Stadium: Estadio Carlos Belmonte; Attendance: 30,812; Referee: Felix Zwayer (Germany)

===== Second round Path C =====
The winners of each path will qualify for the World Cup.

Semi-finals
26 March 2026 – Bratislava
Slovakia	3
Kosovo	4
26 March 2026 – Istanbul
Turkey	1
Romania	0

Final
31 March 2026 – Pristina
Kosovo	0
Turkey	1

26 March 2026 Semifinal	Turkey	1–0	Romania	Istanbul, Turkey
20:00 TRT (UTC+03:00)	Kadıoğlu 53'	Report		Stadium: Beşiktaş Stadium; Attendance: 38,979; Referee: François Letexier (France)

31 March 2026 Final	Kosovo	0–1	Turkey	Pristina, Kosovo
20:45 CEST (UTC+02:00)		Report	Aktürkoğlu 53'	Stadium: Fadil Vokrri Stadium; Attendance: 12,887; Referee: Michael Oliver (England)

==== 2026 FIFA World Cup ====
===== 2026 FIFA World Cup Group D =====
Pos	Team	Pld	W	D	L	GF	GA	GD	Pts	Qualification
1	United States (H)	3	2	0	1	8	4	+4	6	Advance to knockout stage
2	Australia	3	1	1	1	2	2	0	4 (Note: Tied on head-to-head result (Paraguay 0–0 Australia). Overall goal difference was used as the tiebreaker.)	Advance to knockout stage
3	Paraguay	3	1	1	1	2	4	−2	4	Advance to knockout stage
4	Turkey	3	1	0	2	3	5	−2	3	

Source: FIFA
Rules for classification: Group stage tiebreakers
(H) Hosts
Notes:

13 June 2026	Australia	2–0	Turkey	Vancouver, Canada
21:00 PDT (UTC−07:00)	Irankunda 27'; Metcalfe 75'	Report		Stadium: BC Place; Attendance: 52,497; Referee: Jesús Valenzuela (Venezuela)

19 June 2026	Turkey	0–1	Paraguay	Santa Clara, United States
20:00 PDT (UTC−07:00)		Report	Galarza 2'	Stadium: Levi's Stadium; Attendance: 68,827; Referee: Iván Barton (El Salvador)

25 June 2026	Turkey	3–2	United States	Inglewood, United States
19:00 PDT (UTC−07:00)	Güler 10'; Yılmaz 31'; Ayhan 90+8'	Report	Trusty 3'; Berhalter 49'	Stadium: SoFi Stadium; Attendance: 70,492; Referee: Mustapha Ghorbal (Algeria)

=== Turkey women's national football team ===
24 October 2025 2025 UEFA Nations League play-off	Kosovo	0–4	Turkey	Pristina, Kosovo
17:00 CEST (UTC+02:00)		Report	Hançar 5', 10'; Pekel 23'; Şeker 81'	Stadium: Fadil Vokrri Stadium; Referee: Michaela Pachtova (Czech Republic)

28 October 2025 2025 UEFA Nations League play-off	Turkey	3–0	Kosovo	İzmir, Turkey
20:00 TRT (UTC+03:00)	Pekel 22'; Hançar 29' (pen.); Şeker 78'	Report		Stadium: Gürsel Aksel Stadium; Referee: Miriama Bočková (Slovakia)

28 November 2025 Friendly	Turkey	1–1	Albania	Istanbul, Turkey
15:00	Topçu 50'	Report	Hilaj 20'	Stadium: Necmi Kadıoğlu Stadium; Referee: Lutfaliyeva Farida (Azerbaijan)

29 November 2025 Friendly	Turkey	4–0	Turkey U23	Istanbul, Turkey
16:00		Report		Stadium: Riva 1 No'lu Saha

1 December 2025 Friendly	Turkey	2–0	Albania	Istanbul, Turkey
16:00	Şeker 14'; Altunkulak 81'	Report		Stadium: Türk Hava Yolları Stadium; Referee: Lutfaliyeva Farida (Azerbaijan)

==== 2027 FIFA Women's World Cup qualification ====
===== Group B2 =====
Pos	Team	Pld	W	D	L	GF	GA	GD	Pts	Promotion, qualification or relegation	(Switzerland)	(Turkey)	(Northern Ireland)	(Malta)
1	Switzerland (P)	6	5	1	0	18	5	+13	16	Advance to play-offs and promotion to League A	—	3–1	2–0	6–1
2	Turkey	6	4	1	1	11	5	+6	13	Advance to play-offs	1–1	—	2–1	3–0
3	Northern Ireland	6	2	0	4	10	9	+1	6	Advance to play-offs	1–2	0–1	—	4–0
4	Malta (R)	6	0	0	6	4	24	−20	0	Relegation to League C	1–4	0–3	2–4	—

Source: UEFA
Rules for classification: Tiebreakers
(P) Promoted; (R) Relegated

3 March 2026	Turkey	3–0	Malta	Istanbul, Turkey
17:00 TRT (UTC+03:00)	Farrugia 7' (o.g.); Topçu 29'; Karabulut 88'	Report		Stadium: Pendik Stadium; Attendance: 275; Referee: Eugenia Gil Soriano (Spain)

7 March 2026	Northern Ireland	0–1	Turkey	Lurgan, Northern Ireland
19:00 GMT (UTC+00:00)		Report	Türkoğlu 24'	Stadium: Mourneview Park; Attendance: 2,186; Referee: Olivia Tschon (Austria)

14 April 2026	Switzerland	3–1	Turkey	Zurich, Switzerland
19:00 CEST (UTC+02:00)	Csillag 49', 75'; Calligaris 80'	Report	Topçu 52'	Stadium: Letzigrund; Attendance: 12,355; Referee: Sofiya Prychyna (Ukraine)

18 April 2026	Turkey	1–1	Switzerland	Sinop, Turkey
19:00 TRT (UTC+03:00)	Altınkulak 79'	Report	Crnogorčević 52'	Stadium: Sinop Şehir Stadium; Attendance: 5,981; Referee: Katalin Kulcsár (Hungary)

5 June 2026	Turkey	2–1	Northern Ireland	Istanbul, Turkey
20:00 TRT (UTC+03:00)	Pekel 26'; Şeker 48'	Report	Bell 45' (pen.)	Stadium: Pendik Stadium; Attendance: 1,117; Referee: Alexandra Collin (France)

9 June 2026	Malta	0–3	Turkey	Ta' Qali, Malta
19:00 CEST (UTC+02:00)		Report	Gatt 8' (o.g.); Türkoğlu 38'; Altunkulak 52'	Stadium: Centenary Stadium; Attendance: 994; Referee: Sabina Bolić (Croatia)

== UEFA competitions ==
=== UEFA Champions League ===
==== Qualifying round ====
===== Third qualifying round =====
Team 1	Agg.	Team 2	1st leg	2nd leg
Feyenoord (Netherlands)	4–6	(Turkey) Fenerbahçe	2–1	2–5

===== Play-off round =====
Team 1	Agg.	Team 2	1st leg	2nd leg
Fenerbahçe (Turkey)	0–1	(Portugal) Benfica	0–0	0–1

==== League phase ====
===== Galatasaray =====
Pos	Team	Pld	W	D	L	GF	GA	GD	Pts	Qualification
18	(Hellenic Football Federation) Olympiacos	8	3	2	3	10	14	−4	11	Advance to knockout phase play-offs (unseeded)
19	(Royal Belgian Football Association) Club Brugge	8	3	1	4	15	17	−2	10	Advance to knockout phase play-offs (unseeded)
20	(Turkish Football Federation) Galatasaray	8	3	1	4	9	11	−2	10	Advance to knockout phase play-offs (unseeded)
21	(French Football Federation) Monaco	8	2	4	2	8	14	−6	10	Advance to knockout phase play-offs (unseeded)
22	(Association of Football Federations of Azerbaijan) Qarabağ	8	3	1	4	13	21	−8	10	Advance to knockout phase play-offs (unseeded)

Source: UEFA
Rules for classification: League phase tiebreakers

Home team	Score	Away team
Eintracht Frankfurt (Germany)	5–1	(Turkey) Galatasaray
Galatasaray (Turkey)	1–0	(England) Liverpool
Galatasaray (Turkey)	3–1	(Norway) Bodø/Glimt
Ajax (Netherlands)	0–3	(Turkey) Galatasaray
Galatasaray (Turkey)	0–1	(Belgium) Union Saint-Gilloise
Monaco (France)	1–0	(Turkey) Galatasaray
Galatasaray (Turkey)	1–1	(Spain) Atlético Madrid
Manchester City (England)	2–0	(Turkey) Galatasaray

==== Knockout phase ====
===== Knockout phase play-offs =====
Home team	Agg.	Away team	1st leg	2nd leg
Galatasaray (Turkey)	7–5	(Italy) Juventus	5–2	2–3 (a.e.t.)

===== Round of 16 =====
Home team	Agg.	Away team	1st leg	2nd leg
Galatasaray (Turkey)	1–4	(England) Liverpool	1–0	0–4

=== UEFA Europa League ===
==== Qualifying round ====
===== Second qualifying round =====
Team 1	Agg.	Team 2	1st leg	2nd leg
Beşiktaş (Turkey)	2–6	(Ukraine) Shakhtar Donetsk	2–4	0–2

===== Play-off round =====
Team 1	Agg.	Team 2	1st leg	2nd leg
Panathinaikos (Greece)	2–1	(Turkey) Samsunspor	2–1	0–0

==== League phase ====
===== Fenerbahçe =====
Pos	Team	Pld	W	D	L	GF	GA	GD	Pts	Qualification
17	(Hellenic Football Federation) PAOK	8	3	3	2	17	14	+3	12	Advance to knockout phase play-offs (unseeded)
18	(French Football Federation) Lille	8	4	0	4	12	9	+3	12	Advance to knockout phase play-offs (unseeded)
19	(Turkish Football Federation) Fenerbahçe	8	3	3	2	10	7	+3	12	Advance to knockout phase play-offs (unseeded)
20	(Hellenic Football Federation) Panathinaikos	8	3	3	2	11	9	+2	12	Advance to knockout phase play-offs (unseeded)
21	(Scottish Football Association) Celtic	8	3	2	3	13	15	−2	11	Advance to knockout phase play-offs (unseeded)

Source: UEFA
Rules for classification: League phase tiebreakers

Home team	Score	Away team
Dinamo Zagreb (Croatia)	3–1	(Turkey) Fenerbahçe
Fenerbahçe (Turkey)	2–1	(France) Nice
Fenerbahçe (Turkey)	1–0	(Germany) VfB Stuttgart
Viktoria Plzeň (Czech Republic)	0–0	(Turkey) Fenerbahçe
Fenerbahçe (Turkey)	1–1	(Hungary) Ferencváros
Brann (Norway)	0–4	(Turkey) Fenerbahçe
Fenerbahçe (Turkey)	0–1	(England) Aston Villa
FCSB (Romania)	1–1	(Turkey) Fenerbahçe

==== Knockout phase ====
===== Knockout phase play-offs =====
Home team	Agg.	Away team	1st leg	2nd leg
Fenerbahçe (Turkey)	2–4	(England) Nottingham Forest	0–3	2–1

=== UEFA Conference League ===
==== Qualifying round ====
===== Second qualifying round =====
Team 1	Agg.	Team 2	1st leg	2nd leg
Cherno More (Bulgaria)	0–5	(Turkey) İstanbul Başakşehir	0–1	0–4

===== Third qualifying round =====
Team 1	Agg.	Team 2	1st leg	2nd leg
Viking (Norway)	2–4	(Turkey) İstanbul Başakşehir	1–3	1–1
St Patrick's Athletic (Republic of Ireland)	3–7	(Turkey) Beşiktaş	1–4	2–3

===== Play-off round =====
Team 1	Agg.	Team 2	1st leg	2nd leg
İstanbul Başakşehir (Turkey)	2–5	(Romania) Universitatea Craiova	1–2	1–3
Lausanne-Sport (Switzerland)	2–1	(Turkey) Beşiktaş	1–1	1–0

==== League phase ====
===== Samsunspor =====
Pos	Team	Pld	W	D	L	GF	GA	GD	Pts	Qualification
10	(The Football Association) Crystal Palace	6	3	1	2	11	6	+5	10	Advance to knockout phase play-offs (seeded)
11	(Polish Football Association) Lech Poznań	6	3	1	2	12	8	+4	10	Advance to knockout phase play-offs (seeded)
12	(Turkish Football Federation) Samsunspor	6	3	1	2	10	6	+4	10	Advance to knockout phase play-offs (seeded)
13	(Football Association of Slovenia) Celje	6	3	1	2	8	7	+1	10	Advance to knockout phase play-offs (seeded)
14	(Royal Dutch Football Association) AZ	6	3	1	2	7	7	0	10	Advance to knockout phase play-offs (seeded)

Source: UEFA
Rules for classification: League phase tiebreakers

Home team	Score	Away team
Legia Warsaw (Poland)	0–1	(Turkey) Samsunspor
Samsunspor (Turkey)	3–0	(Ukraine) Dynamo Kyiv
Samsunspor (Turkey)	3–0	(Malta) Hamrun Spartans
Breiðablik (Iceland)	2–2	(Turkey) Samsunspor
Samsunspor (Turkey)	1–2	(Greece) AEK Athens
Mainz 05 (Germany)	2–0	(Turkey) Samsunspor

==== Knockout phase ====
===== Knockout phase play-offs =====
Team 1	Agg.	Team 2	1st leg	2nd leg
Shkëndija (North Macedonia)	0–5	(Turkey) Samsunspor	0–1	0–4

===== Round of 16 =====
Team 1	Agg.	Team 2	1st leg	2nd leg
Samsunspor (Turkey)	2–3	(Spain) Rayo Vallecano	1–3	1–0

=== UEFA Women's Champions League ===
==== First qualifying round ====
Tournament 4
Team 1	Score	Team 2
ABB Fomget (Turkey)	2–0	(Azerbaijan) Neftchi Baku
Kiryat Gat (Israel)	1–3	(Turkey) ABB Fomget

==== Second qualifying round ====
Tournament 7
Team 1	Score	Team 2
Slavia Prague (Czech Republic)	2–1	(Turkey) ABB Fomget
HJK (Finland)	2–3	(Turkey) ABB Fomget

=== UEFA Women's Europa Cup ===
==== First qualifying round ====
First qualifying round
Team 1	Agg.	Team 2	1st leg	2nd leg
SFK 2000 (Bosnia and Herzegovina)	3–3 (3–2 p)	(Turkey) ABB Fomget	0–0	3–3 (a.e.t.)

== League competitions (Men's) ==
=== Pre–season ===
League	Promoted to league	Relegated from league
Süper Lig	Kocaelispor; Gençlerbirliği; Fatih Karagümrük	Bodrum; Sivasspor; Hatayspor; Adana Demirspor
1. Lig	Serik Belediyespor; Sarıyer; Vanspor	Ankaragücü; Şanlıurfaspor; Adanaspor; Yeni Malatyaspor
2. Lig	Bursaspor; Muğlaspor; Aliağa; Mardin 1969; Kahramanmaraş İstiklalspor; Muşspor	Karaköprü Belediyespor; Altay; Afyonspor; Diyarbekirspor; Nazillispor; Giresunspor
3. Lig	12 Bingölspor; 1926 Bulancakspor; Malatya Yeşilyurtspor; Kilis Belediyespor; Karadeniz Ereğli Belediyespor; Eskişehirspor; Denizli İdman Yurdu; Fethiye İdman Yurdu; Yeşil Yalova; Galata; Suvermez Kapadokyaspor; İnkılap	1922 Konyaspor; 23 Elazığ; Turgutluspor; Adıyaman; Bayburt Özel İdarespor; Büyükçekmece Tepecikspor; Denizlispor; Ergene Velimeşe; Kelkit Hürriyetspor; Kuşadasıspor; Nevşehir Belediyespor; Viranşehir Belediyespor

=== Süper Lig ===
==== League table ====
Pos	Team	Pld	W	D	L	GF	GA	GD	Pts	Qualification or relegation
1	Galatasaray (C)	34	24	5	5	77	30	+47	77	Qualification for the Champions League league phase
2	Fenerbahçe	34	21	11	2	77	37	+40	74	Qualification for the Champions League second qualifying round
3	Trabzonspor	34	20	9	5	61	39	+22	69	Qualification for the Europa League play-off round (Note: The 2025–26 Turkish Cup winners qualified for the Europa League play-off round. Since the cup winners (Trabzonspor) qualified based on league position, the Europa League play-off round spot was passed to the third-placed team, the Europa League second round spot was passed to the fourth-placed team, and the Conference League spot was passed to the fifth-placed team.)
4	Beşiktaş	34	17	9	8	59	40	+19	60	Qualification for the Europa League second qualifying round
5	Başakşehir	34	16	9	9	58	35	+23	57	Qualification for the Conference League second qualifying round
6	Göztepe	34	14	13	7	42	32	+10	55	
7	Samsunspor	34	13	12	9	46	45	+1	51	
8	Rizespor	34	10	11	13	46	52	−6	41	
9	Konyaspor	34	10	10	14	43	50	−7	40	
10	Kocaelispor	34	9	10	15	26	38	−12	37 (Note: Head-to-head points: Kocaelispor 6, Alanyaspor 5, Gaziantep 5. Head-to-head goal difference: Alanyaspor +3, Gaziantep −1.)	
11	Alanyaspor	34	7	16	11	41	41	0	37	
12	Gaziantep	34	9	10	15	43	58	−15	37	
13	Kasımpaşa	34	8	11	15	33	49	−16	35	
14	Gençlerbirliği	34	9	7	18	36	47	−11	34	
15	Eyüpspor	34	8	9	17	33	48	−15	33	
16	Antalyaspor (R)	34	8	8	18	33	55	−22	32	Relegation to TFF 1. Lig
17	Kayserispor (R)	34	6	12	16	27	62	−35	30 (Note: Kayserispor finished ahead of Fatih Karagümrük on head-to-head points: Fatih Karagümrük 2–2 Kayserispor, Kayserispor 1–0 Fatih Karagümrük.)	Relegation to TFF 1. Lig
18	Fatih Karagümrük (R)	34	8	6	20	31	54	−23	30	Relegation to TFF 1. Lig

Source: Süper Lig
Rules for classification: 1) Points; 2) Head-to-head points; 3) Head-to-head goal difference; 4) Head-to-head goals scored; 5) Goal difference; 6) Goals scored; 7) Play-off.
(Note: Head-to-head record is used only after all the matches between the teams in question have been played)
(C) Champions; (R) Relegated

=== TFF First league ===
==== League table ====
Pos	Team	Pld	W	D	L	GF	GA	GD	Pts	Qualification or relegation
1	Erzurumspor (C, P)	38	23	12	3	82	27	+55	81	Promotion to the Süper Lig
2	Amedspor (P)	38	21	11	6	81	42	+39	74	Promotion to the Süper Lig
3	Esenler Erokspor	38	21	11	6	81	35	+46	74	Qualification for the Süper Lig Playoff Final
4	Çorum (P)	38	21	8	9	63	39	+24	71	Qualification for the Süper Lig Playoff Quarter Finals
5	Bodrumspor	38	18	10	10	71	39	+32	64	Qualification for the Süper Lig Playoff Quarter Finals
6	Pendikspor	38	16	15	7	58	33	+25	63	Qualification for the Süper Lig Playoff Quarter Finals
7	Keçiörengücü	38	16	12	10	73	43	+30	60	Qualification for the Süper Lig Playoff Quarter Finals
8	Bandırmaspor	38	16	12	10	47	34	+13	60	
9	Manisa	38	16	7	15	57	56	+1	55	
10	Sivasspor	38	14	11	13	47	43	+4	53	
11	İstanbulspor	38	13	13	12	57	55	+2	52	
12	Sarıyer	38	15	7	16	44	44	0	52	
13	Iğdır	38	13	11	14	52	54	−2	50	
14	Vanspor	38	13	10	15	52	47	+5	49	
15	Boluspor	38	14	6	18	61	57	+4	48	
16	Ümraniyespor	38	13	7	18	47	51	−4	46	
17	Serikspor (R)	38	11	6	21	44	75	−31	39	Relegation to the TFF 2. Lig
18	Sakaryaspor (R)	38	8	10	20	45	72	−27	34	Relegation to the TFF 2. Lig
19	Hatayspor (R)	38	2	8	28	33	102	−69	14	Relegation to the TFF 2. Lig
20	Adana Demirspor (Note: Adana Demirspor were deducted 63 points.) (R)	38	1	3	34	22	169	−147	−57	Relegation to the TFF 2. Lig

Source: TFF
Rules for classification: 1) Points; 2) Head-to-head points; 3) Head-to-head goal difference; 4) Head-to-head goals scored; 5) Goal difference; 6) Goals scored; 7) Play-off.
(C) Champions; (P) Promoted; (R) Relegated

=== TFF Second league ===
==== League table ====
===== White Group =====
Pos	Team	Pld	W	D	L	GF	GA	GD	Pts	Qualification or relegation
1	Batman Petrolspor	36	25	8	3	86	33	+53	83	Promotion to TFF 1. Lig
2	Muğlaspor (P)	36	21	9	6	51	19	+32	72	Qualification for promotion play-offs
3	Elazığspor	36	21	6	9	82	37	+45	69	Qualification for promotion play-offs
4	Adana 01	36	19	10	7	55	35	+20	67	Qualification for promotion play-offs
5	Şanlıurfaspor	36	19	8	9	63	43	+20	65	Qualification for promotion play-offs
6	MKE Ankaragücü	36	18	9	9	52	41	+11	63	
7	İnegölspor	36	16	12	8	67	44	+23	60	
8	İskenderunspor	36	16	8	12	50	44	+6	56	
9	Beyoğlu Yeni Çarşı	36	13	15	8	45	35	+10	54	
10	Ankaraspor	36	13	13	10	64	54	+10	52	
11	24 Erzincanspor	36	15	6	15	55	49	+6	51	
12	Kastamonuspor	36	11	9	16	44	56	−12	42	
13	Karacabey Belediyespor	36	11	8	17	46	55	−9	41	
14	Altınordu	36	8	11	17	33	59	−26	35	
15	Erbaaspor	36	10	7	19	40	61	−21	34 (Note: Erbaaspor were deducted 3 points.)	
16	Beykoz Anadoluspor	36	8	6	22	37	66	−29	30	Relegation to TFF 3. Lig
17	Kepezspor	36	5	8	23	33	78	−45	23	Relegation to TFF 3. Lig
18	Karaman	36	4	9	23	30	86	−56	21	Relegation to TFF 3. Lig
19	Bucaspor 1928	36	4	8	24	38	76	−38	17 (Note: Bucaspor 1928 were deducted 3 points.)	Relegation to TFF 3. Lig

Source: TFF
Rules for classification: 1) Points; 2) Head-to-head points; 3) Head-to-head goal difference; 4) Head-to-head goals scored; 5) Goal difference; 6) Goals scored; 7) Play-off.
(P) Promoted

===== Red Group =====
Pos	Team	Pld	W	D	L	GF	GA	GD	Pts	Qualification or relegation
1	Bursaspor	34	25	5	4	87	19	+68	80	Promotion to TFF 1. Lig
2	Mardin 1969 (P)	34	22	5	7	67	25	+42	71	Qualification for promotion play-offs
3	Muşspor	34	21	7	6	82	35	+47	70	Qualification for promotion play-offs
4	Aliağa	34	21	6	7	81	32	+49	69	Qualification for promotion play-offs
5	Kahramanmaraş İstiklalspor	34	21	4	9	82	33	+49	67	Qualification for promotion play-offs
6	Isparta 32	34	18	9	7	70	36	+34	63	
7	Güzide Gebzespor	34	16	10	8	56	31	+25	58	
8	Menemen	34	15	6	13	57	51	+6	51	
9	Ankara Demirspor	34	14	7	13	47	47	0	49	
10	68 Aksaray Belediyespor	34	11	14	9	52	38	+14	47	
11	1461 Trabzon	34	13	8	13	54	51	+3	47	
12	Arnavutköy Belediyespor	34	13	7	14	40	36	+4	46	
13	Fethiyespor	34	11	11	12	52	41	+11	44	
14	Kırklarelispor	34	9	9	16	44	49	−5	36	
15	Somaspor	34	8	6	20	41	68	−27	30	
16	Yeni Mersin İdmanyurdu	33	4	3	26	22	97	−75	12 (Note: They had 3 points deducted and were relegated.)	Relegation to TFF 3. Lig
17	Adanaspor	34	3	1	30	17	159	−142	1 (Note: Adanaspor were 9 points deducted.)	Relegation to TFF 3. Lig
18	Yeni Malatyaspor	33	0	2	31	8	111	−103	−43 (Note: They had 45 points deducted and were relegated.)	Relegation to TFF 3. Lig

Source: TFF
Rules for classification: 1) Points; 2) Head-to-head points; 3) Head-to-head goal difference; 4) Head-to-head goals scored; 5) Goal difference; 6) Goals scored; 7) Play-off.
(P) Promoted

== Cup competitions (Men's) ==
=== Turkish Super Cup ===
Semi-finals
SF1 - 5 January 2026 – Gaziantep
Galatasaray	4
Trabzonspor	1
SF2 - 6 January 2026 – Adana
Fenerbahçe	2
Samsunspor	0

Final
10 January 2026 – Istanbul
Galatasaray	0
Fenerbahçe	2

==== Final ====
10 January 2026
18:45 UTC+3

Galatasaray	0–2	Fenerbahçe
	Report	Guendouzi 28'; Oosterwolde 48'

Atatürk Olympic Stadium, Istanbul
Attendance: 58,397
Referee: Halil Umut Meler

=== Turkish Cup ===
==== Final ====
22 May 2026
20:45 TRT

Trabzonspor	2–1	Konyaspor
Onuachu 18', 79' (pen.)	Report	Muleka 50'

Antalya Stadium, Antalya
Referee: Halil Umut Meler

== League competitions (Women's) ==
=== Women's Super League ===
Pos	Team	Pld	W	D	L	GF	GA	GD	Pts	Qualification or relegation
1	Fenerbahçe (C)	30	27	2	1	136	9	+127	83	Qualification for the Champions League second qualifying round
2	Trabzonspor	30	24	4	2	106	12	+94	76	
3	Galatasaray	30	24	2	4	104	19	+85	74	
4	ABB Fomget	30	20	3	7	83	24	+59	63	
5	Yüksekova	30	18	7	5	52	16	+36	61	
6	Beşiktaş	30	17	5	8	93	32	+61	56	
7	Amed	30	17	3	10	76	34	+42	54	
8	Hakkarigücü	30	14	6	10	52	34	+18	48	
9	Ünye Kadın	30	13	4	13	52	48	+4	43	
10	Giresun Sanayi	30	12	3	15	41	70	−29	39	
11	Çekmeköy BilgiDoğa	30	9	2	19	37	110	−73	29	
12	Fatih Vatan	30	8	4	18	37	92	−55	25 (Note: Fatih Vatan were deducted 3 points by the decision of the Federation.)	
13	1207 Antalya	30	7	3	20	30	88	−58	21 (Note: 1207 Antalya were deducted 3 points by the decision of the Federation.)	
14	Gaziantep ALG (R)	29	3	0	26	14	160	−146	6 (Note: On 27 February 2026, following a decision by the Amateur Football Disciplinary Committee, Gaziantep ALG was expelled from the league, with all of their matches forfeited and recorded as 3–0 victories for their opponents. 3 points deducted by the decision of the Federation.)	Relegation to the First League
15	Bornova Hitab (R)	28	0	0	28	0	84	−84	0 (Note: On 17 September 2025, following a decision by the Amateur Football Disciplinary Committee, Bornova Hitab Spor was expelled from the league, with all of their matches forfeited and recorded as 3–0 victories for their opponents.)	Relegation to the First League
16	Beylerbeyi (R)	27	0	0	27	0	81	−81	−3 (Note: On 3 October 2025, following a decision by the Amateur Football Disciplinary Committee, Beylerbeyi was expelled from the league, with all of their matches forfeited and recorded as 3–0 victories for their opponents. 3 points deducted by the decision of the Federation.)	Relegation to the First League

Source: TFF
(C) Champions; (R) Relegated

=== Women's First League ===
==== Group A ====
Pos	Team	Pld	W	D	L	GF	GA	GD	Pts	Qualification or relegation
1	Kayseri	14	13	1	0	86	8	+78	40	Promotion to Super League
2	Gaziantep Safir	14	12	1	1	91	9	+82	37	Qualification for Promotion play-off
3	Genç Ülküm	14	8	1	5	52	16	+36	22 (Note: 3 points deducted by the decision of the Federation)	
4	Adana İdman Yurdu	14	7	1	6	43	34	+9	22	
5	Gazikentspor	14	6	2	6	45	37	+8	20	
6	Şırnak	14	4	0	10	18	64	−46	12	
7	Hatay Defnespor	14	1	1	12	15	120	−105	4	Qualification for Relegation play-out
8	Gaziantep Asyaspor	14	1	1	12	11	73	−62	1	Relegation to the Second League

Source: TFF

==== Group B ====
Pos	Team	Pld	W	D	L	GF	GA	GD	Pts	Qualification or relegation
1	Bakırköy	16	13	2	1	58	10	+48	41	Promotion to Super League
2	Haymana	16	12	2	2	58	6	+52	38	Qualification for Promotion play-off
3	Dudullu	16	12	1	3	44	14	+30	37	
4	Horozkent	16	10	3	3	49	18	+31	33	
5	Soma Zafer Spor ve Gençlik	16	5	3	8	24	31	−7	18	
6	Kocaeli	16	5	1	10	29	40	−11	16	
7	Sakarya	16	4	2	10	22	47	−25	14	
8	Telsiz Spor	16	2	2	12	14	76	−62	8	Qualification for Relegation play-out
9	Gölbaşı Belediyespor	16	1	0	15	3	59	−56	0 (Note: 3 points deducted by the decision of the Federation)	Relegation to the Second League

Source: TFF
