= 2025–26 Turkish Women's Football First League =

Turkish Women's Football First League
- Season: 2025–26
- Dates: 18 October 2025 – 25 March 2026
- Champions: Bakırköy
- Promoted: Kayseri; Bakırköy; Haymana
- Relegated: Gaziantep Asyaspor; Gölbaşı Belediyespor; Hatay Defnespor
- Matches: 131
- Goals: 678 (5.18 per match)
- Top goalscorer: Kafayat Bashiru (44 goals)
- Biggest home win: Kayseri 14–0 Hatay Defnespor (11 January 2026)
- Biggest away win: Hatay Defnespor 0–16 Gazikentspor (8 November 2025)
- Highest scoring: Hatay Defnespor 0–16 Gazikentspor (8 November 2025)
- Longest winning run: 7 matches Haymana
- Longest unbeaten run: 14 matches Kayseri
- Longest winless run: 12 matches Hatay Defnespor; Gölbaşı Belediyespor
- Longest losing run: 12 matches Gölbaşı Belediyespor

The 2025–26 Turkish Women's Football First League (Turkish: TFF Kadın Futbol 1. Ligi 2025–2026 Sezonu) was the 29th season of Turkey's second highest tier women's football league.

A total of 17 teams, 13 from the previous season and 3 promoted from the Second League, compete in the 2025–26 Turkish Women's Football First League. The league is played in two regional groups in a double round-robin format. Group winners are directly promoted to the Super League and contest a single-match championship final, while runners-up play a single-leg play-off to determine the third promoted team.

Three teams are relegated to the Second League. The bottom teams of each group automatically, and the second-bottom teams through a play-out match organized by the Turkish Football Federation. The season began on 18 October 2025 and concluded on 25 March 2026, with a mid-season break from 21 December 2025 to 4 January 2026.

== Teams ==
=== Group A ===
Location of teams in the 2025–26 season of Turkish Women's First Football League – Group A

Team	Hometown	Stadium
Adana İdman Yurdu	Adana	Muharrem Gülergin
Gaziantep Asyaspor	Gaziantep	Batur Stadium
Gaziantep Safir	Gaziantep	Batur Stadium
Gazikentspor	Gaziantep	Batur Stadium
Genç Ülküm	Konya	Dumlupınar Football Field
Hatay Defnespor	Hatay	Antakya Stadium
Kayseri FK	Kayseri	Sümer Football Field
Şırnak SK	Şırnak	Şırnak City Stadium

=== Group B ===
Location of teams in the 2025–26 season of Turkish Women's First Football League – Group B
Location of Istanbul teams in the 2025–26 season of Turkish Women's First Football League

Team	Hometown	Stadium
Bakırköy SK	Bakırköy, İstanbul	Bakırköy Municipality Stadium
Dudullu	Ümraniye, İstanbul	Dudullu Stadium
Gölbaşı Belediyespor	Gölbaşı, Ankara	Gölbaşı Football Field
Haymana SK	Haymana, Ankara	Haymana City Stadium
Horozkent	Denizli	Başkarcı Stadium
Kocaeli Bayan FK	Kocaeli	Mehmet Ali Kağıtçı Stadium
Sakarya	Sakarya	Erenler Atatürk Stadium
Soma Zafer Spor ve Gençlik	Soma, Manisa	Soma Atatürk Stadium
Telsiz Spor	Zeytinburnu, İstanbul	Merkezefendi Zeytinburnu Stadium

== Regular season ==
=== Group A ===
Pos	Team	Pld	W	D	L	GF	GA	GD	Pts	Qualification or relegation
1	Kayseri	14	13	1	0	86	8	+78	40	Promotion to Super League
2	Gaziantep Safir	14	12	1	1	91	9	+82	37	Qualification for Promotion play-off
3	Genç Ülküm	14	8	1	5	52	16	+36	22 (Note: 3 points deducted by the decision of the Federation)	
4	Adana İdman Yurdu	14	7	1	6	43	34	+9	22	
5	Gazikentspor	14	6	2	6	45	37	+8	20	
6	Şırnak	14	4	0	10	18	64	−46	12	
7	Hatay Defnespor	14	1	1	12	15	120	−105	4	Qualification for Relegation play-out
8	Gaziantep Asyaspor	14	1	1	12	11	73	−62	1	Relegation to the Second League

Source: TFF

=== Group B ===
Pos	Team	Pld	W	D	L	GF	GA	GD	Pts	Qualification or relegation
1	Bakırköy	16	13	2	1	58	10	+48	41	Promotion to Super League
2	Haymana	16	12	2	2	58	6	+52	38	Qualification for Promotion play-off
3	Dudullu	16	12	1	3	44	14	+30	37	
4	Horozkent	16	10	3	3	49	18	+31	33	
5	Soma Zafer Spor ve Gençlik	16	5	3	8	24	31	−7	18	
6	Kocaeli	16	5	1	10	29	40	−11	16	
7	Sakarya	16	4	2	10	22	47	−25	14	
8	Telsiz Spor	16	2	2	12	14	76	−62	8	Qualification for Relegation play-out
9	Gölbaşı Belediyespor	16	1	0	15	3	59	−56	0 (Note: 3 points deducted by the decision of the Federation)	Relegation to the Second League

Source: TFF

== Knockout matches ==
=== Relegation play-out ===
25 March 2026	Telsiz Spor	3–2	Hatay Defnespor	Istanbul
13:00 UTC+3	Khudiybirdi 28'; Daşdemir 47'; Akkaya 51'	Report	Canoruç 66' (pen.); Avcı 88' (o.g.)	Stadium: Sultanbeyli 100. Yıl Stadium; Referee: Muhammed Şamil Göçgün

=== Promotion play-off ===
24 March 2026	Gaziantep Safir	2–4	Haymana	Eskişehir
12:00 UTC+3	Aliyeva 1'; Noel 12'	Report	Türçin 47'; Muradova 76'; Owusu 78', 89'	Stadium: Osmangazi University Football Field; Referee: Burcu Özdemir

=== Championship final ===
24 March 2026	Kayseri	0–5	Bakırköy	Eskişehir
15:00 UTC+3		Report	Altun 3' (o.g.); Ataç 41'; Jafaru 54'; Ramírez 67', 76'	Stadium: Osmangazi University Football Field; Referee: Mert Yıldırım

== Season statistics ==
=== Top goalscorers ===
Rank	Player	Team	Goals
1	(Nigeria) Kafayat Bashiru	Kayseri	44
2	(Turkey) İrem Yılmaz	Gaziantep Safir	26
3	(Turkey) Beyza Kara	Gaziantep Safir	18
4	(Ghana) Princess Owusu	Haymana	16
5	(Turkey) Büşra Becerikli	Gaziantep Safir	14
6	(Turkey) Kardelen Patoğlu	Gazikentspor	13
7	(Ghana) Sandra Owusu-Ansah	Gaziantep Safir	12
7	(Turkey) Yasemin Sarı	Genç Ülküm	12
9	(Turkey) Damla Akçil	Kocaeli	11
10	(Turkey) Nisanur Yıldırım	Kayseri	10
10	(Turkey) Pınarsu Cılız	Dudullu	10
10	(Turkey) Sena Karakaya	Genç Ülküm	10
10	(Turkey) Zeynep Bilir	Kayseri	10
