= 2026–27 Turkish Women's Football First League =

Turkish Women's Football First League
- Season: 2026–27
- Dates: 20 September 2026 – 4 January 2027
- Matches: 64
- Goals: 243 (3.8 per match)
- Top goalscorer: Funda Altınkaya; Neslihan Demirdögen (13 goals)
- All statistics correct as of 15 November 2026.

The 2026–27 Turkish Women's Football First League (Turkish: TFF Kadın Futbol 1. Ligi 2025–2026 Sezonu) is the 30th season of Turkey's second highest tier women's football league.

A total of 16 teams, 11 from the previous season and 5 promoted from the Second League, compete in the 2026–27 Turkish Women's Football First League. The league is played in two regional groups in a double round-robin format. Group winners are directly promoted to the Super League, while runners-up play a single-leg play-off to determine the third promoted team.

The bottom 2 teams of each group are relegated to the Second League. The season will begin on 20 September 2026 and conclude on 4 January 2027, with a mid-season break from 8 November 2026 to 15 November 2026.

== Teams ==
=== Group A ===
Location of teams in the 2026–27 season of Turkish Women's First Football League – Group A

Team	Hometown	Stadium
Avcılar Cihangirspor	Avcılar, Istanbul	
Dudullu	Ümraniye, İstanbul	Dudullu Stadium
Kdz. Ereğli Lisesi	Zonguldak	
Kocaeli Bayan FK	Kocaeli	Mehmet Ali Kağıtçı Stadium
Sakarya	Sakarya	Erenler Atatürk Stadium
Sancaktepe Belediye	Sancaktepe, Istanbul	
Soma Zafer Spor ve Gençlik	Soma, Manisa	Soma Atatürk Stadium
Telsiz Spor	Zeytinburnu, İstanbul	Merkezefendi Zeytinburnu Stadium

=== Group B ===
Location of teams in the 2026–27 season of Turkish Women's First Football League – Group B
Location of Istanbul teams in the 2026–27 season of Turkish Women's First Football League

Team	Hometown	Stadium
Adana İdman Yurdu	Adana	Muharrem Gülergin
Afyonkarahisar Anadolu Gücü	Afyonkarahisar	
Gaziantep Safir	Gaziantep	Batur Stadium
Gazikentspor	Gaziantep	Batur Stadium
Genç Ülküm	Konya	Dumlupınar Football Field
Horozkent	Denizli	Başkarcı Stadium
Siverek Kadın	Şanlıurfa	
Şırnak Kadın	Şırnak	

== Regular season ==
=== Group A ===
Pos	Team	Pld	W	D	L	GF	GA	GD	Pts	Qualification or relegation
1	Avcılar Cihangirspor	8	5	2	1	18	5	+13	17	Promotion to Super League
2	Dudullu	6	5	1	0	17	5	+12	16	Qualification for Promotion play-off
3	Soma Zafer Spor ve Gençlik	8	4	2	2	17	12	+5	14	
4	Sancaktepe Belediye	9	3	4	2	19	12	+7	13	
5	Kocaeli	8	3	2	3	12	15	−3	11	
6	Sakarya	8	2	3	3	8	20	−12	9	
7	Kdz. Ereğli Lisesi	8	1	1	6	8	21	−13	4	Relegation to the Second League
8	Telsiz Spor	7	0	1	6	5	14	−9	1	Relegation to the Second League

Updated to match(es) played on 15 November 2026. Source: TFF

=== Group B ===
Pos	Team	Pld	W	D	L	GF	GA	GD	Pts	Qualification or relegation
1	Gaziantep Safir	9	9	0	0	40	0	+40	27	Promotion to Super League
2	Afyonkarahisar Anadolu Gücü	8	6	1	1	32	6	+26	19	Qualification for Promotion play-off
3	Siverek Kadın	8	5	1	2	18	15	+3	16	
4	Genç Ülküm	8	4	0	4	24	18	+6	12	
5	Şırnak Kadın	7	4	0	3	12	10	+2	12	
6	Adana İdman Yurdu	8	2	0	6	7	18	−11	6	
7	Gazikentspor	8	1	0	7	4	24	−20	3	Relegation to the Second League
8	Horozkent	8	0	0	8	2	48	−46	0	Relegation to the Second League

Updated to match(es) played on 14 November 2026. Source: TFF
