= Laurie-Ann Moïse =

Association football player (born 2001)

Personal information
- Date of birth: 5 November 2001 (age 25)
- Place of birth: Saint-Eustache, Quebec, Canada
- Height: 1.70 m (5 ft 7 in)
- Position: Forward

Team information
- Current team: CS Mont-Royal Outremont

College career
Years	Team	Apps	(Gls)
2022	Texas Tech Red Raiders	10	(0)
2023	Cal State Fullerton Titans	17	(1)
2024	South Alabama Jaguars	15	(2)

Senior career*
Years	Team	Apps	(Gls)
2018	Lakers du Lac St-Louis	8	(2)
2021	CS Monteuil	6	(7)
2022–2025	FC Laval	25+	(11+)
2025–2026	Sydney FC	1	(0)
2026	Ljuboten	7	(8)
2026	CS Mont-Royal Outremont	9	(5)
2026–	Kayseri	4	(3)

International career^{‡}
2024–	Haiti	4	(0)
- * Club domestic league appearances and goals as of 20 September 2026 ‡ National team caps and goals as of 18 September 2025

Laurie-Ann Moïse (Haitian Creole: [lɔ.ʁi an mɔ.iz]; (Note: As pronounced in Haitian Creole and Haitian French) born 5 November 2001) is a professional footballer who plays as a forward for Kayseri in the Turkish Women's Football Super League. Born in Canada, she plays for the Haiti national team. A left-footed player, she is known for her technical ability and physicality, and is regarded as one of Haiti's best young talents.

== Collegiate career ==
=== CEGEP ===
In 2019, Moïse began her CEGEP at Champlain College Saint-Lambert, where she also played for the soccer team. She won the 2019 RSEQ title, being named MVP.

In 2021, she attended Vanier College. She helped them win the CCAA title, being named MVP.

=== College ===
In 2022, Moïse moved to the United States to attend Texas Tech University, where she played for the women's soccer team.

In 2023, she transferred to California State University, Fullerton, joining the women's soccer team. On August 19, she scored her first collegiate goal, in a match against the BYU Cougars.

In 2024, she transferred to the University of South Alabama to join their women's soccer team. On September 8, she scored her first goal, in a 3–2 victory over the Tennessee Tech Golden Eagles.

== Club career ==
Moïse began her senior career in the Première ligue de soccer du Québec with Lakers du Lac St-Louis, later joining CS Monteuil and FC Laval.

In September 2025, Moïse moved to Australia and signed for A-League Women club Sydney FC ahead of the 2025–26 season on her first professional contract, fulfilling her "lifelong dream" of playing professionally. Despite receiving praise from manager Ante Jurić upon her arrival, she only featured once for the club during her short stint, making her debut in the opening round by coming on as a substitute in a 2–2 draw at home with Melbourne City at Leichhardt Oval in Leichhardt. She departed the club midseason for an opportunity in Europe.

In February 2026, she signed a six-month contract with Macedonian club Ljuboten in the 1. Liga Žen. During her time with the club, she scored eight goals in seven matches.

At the end of her contract, she briefly returned to Quebec, playing for CS Mont-Royal Outremont.

In August 2026, she signed with Kayseri in the Turkish Women's Football Super League. On 30 August 2026, she scored a hat trick in her debut, a 4–3 victory over Sultanbeyli Gücü, including the winning goal in the 90+4 minute.
