= Haymana SK =

- Full name: Haymana Spor Kulübü
- Founded: 2023 (women's team); 1975 (club)
- Ground: Haymana District Stadium
- Coordinates: 39.42701°N 32.49970°E
- Chairman: Evren Öz
- Manager: (Turkey) Metin Karagöz
- League: Turkish Women's Super League

Haymana SK (Turkish: Haymana Spor Kulübü) is a women's football club based at Haymana district in Ankara Province, Turkey playing in the Turkish Women's Football Super League.

== History ==
The women's side of the Haymana SK was established as Haymana Belediye SK, sponsored by the District Municipality. The team started to play in the lowest keague level, the Women's Third League. They finished the Group 11 of the 2023–24 League season as group leader. Although lost the quarter-finals, they were promoted to the third-tier Women's Second League for the next season.

Haymana, which played in the Group B of the 2024–25 Turkish Women's Second League season, became league leader. After winning the quarter-finals, semi-finals and the final match of the play-offs, they became league champion, and were promoted to the second-tier Turkish Women's Football First League for the next season.

The team finished the Group B of the 2025–26 Women's First League season on second place. In the play-offs, they played the third-place match against Gaziantep Safir. After winning the game by 4-2, they were promoted to the topflight Women's Super League as the third club.

== Stadium ==
The team play home matches at Haymana District Stadium in Haymana. The stadium was renovated, and re-opened in January 2026. The existing ground surface of natural grass was converted to artificial turf due to the water scarcity in the district. The renovation included installation of floodlight for night games.

== Statistics ==
As of 1 November 2026.ref name="tff3"/>

| Season | League | Rank | Pld | W | D | L | GF | GA | GD | Pts |
|---|---|---|---|---|---|---|---|---|---|---|
| 2023–24 | Third League Gr. 11 | 1 | 12 | 11 | 0 | 1 | 72 | 3 | +69 | 33 |
| 2023–24 | Play-offs | | 3 | 2 | 0 | 1 | 6 | 2 | +4 | 6 |
| 2024–25 | Second League Gr. B | 1 | 16 | 15 | 0 | 1 | 66 | 9 | +57 | 45 |
| 2024–25 | Play-offs | 1 | 7 | 6 | 1 | 0 | 25 | 4 | +21 | 19 |
| 2025–26 | First League Gr. B | 2 | 16 | 12 | 2 | 2 | 58 | 6 | +52 | 38 |
| 2025–26 | Play-offs | 3 | 1 | 1 | 0 | 0 | 4 | 2 | +2 | 3 |
| 2026–27 | Super League | 14 | 9 (Note: Season in progress) | 2 | 2 | 5 | 22 | 24 | -2 | 8 |
Green marks a season followed by promotion, red a season followed by relegation.

- Legend:

== Current squad ==
As of 13 September 2026.

- Head coach: (Turkey) Metin Karagöz

Note: Flags indicate national team as defined under FIFA eligibility rules; some limited exceptions apply. Players may hold more than one non-FIFA nationality.

| No. | Pos. | Nation | Player |
|---|---|---|---|
| 1 | GK | USA | Sydney Bellamy |
| 12 | GK | TUR | Zeynep Ela Uyanık |
| 5 | DF | TUR | Ezel Göçmen |
| 22 | DF | KEN | Euphrasier Shilwatso |
| 27 | DF | KEN | Lavin Achola |
| 57 | DF | TUR | Özge Harman |
| 78 | DF | TUR | Nursena Gökkaya |

| No. | Pos. | Nation | Player |
|---|---|---|---|
| 6 | MF | TUR | Elvin Balcı |
| 8 | MF | MKD | Aleksandra Markovska |
| 10 | MF | TUR | Nisa Yeşilyurt |
| 7 | FW | GHA | Princess Owusu |
| 11 | FW | USA | Paola Ellis |
| 17 | FW | TUR | Ülkü Sıla Tıraş |
| 19 | FW | RWA | Zawadi Usanase |
| 77 | FW | TUR | Azra Tıraş |
