= Princess Owusu =

Ghanaian footballer (born 2005)

Personal information
- Date of birth: 15 May 2005 (age 21)
- Place of birth: Ghana
- Position: Forward

Team information
- Current team: Haymana
- Number: 7

Senior career*
Years	Team	Apps	(Gls)
2021–2023	Fabulous Ladies		
2023	Soma Zafer	8	(4)
2024–2025	Ünye Kadın	37	(9)
2025–	Haymana	23	(21)

International career
- Ghana U17
- Ghana
- * Club domestic league appearances and goals as of 28 October 2025

Princess Owusu (born 15 May 2005) is a Ghanaian women's football forward who plays in the Turkish Super League for Haymana, and for the Ghana women's national football team. She played also for the Ghana national U17 team.

== Club career ==
Owusu plays in the forward position.

She played in the Ghana Women's Premier League for Fabulous Ladies in Kumasi. She captained the team, and became the top goalscorer in the 2021–22 season,

In October 2024, Owusu moved to Turkey, and signed with Soma Zafer SG to play in the second-tier Turkish First League. She scored four goals in eight matches.

In the second half of the 2023–24 season of the same league, she transferred to Ünye Kadın in Ordu. She contributed to her team's league champion title netting five goals in 13 games. She remained in the club to play her team's promotion to the Super League.

In October 2025, she joined Haymana in Ankara. Scoring 14 goals, she helped her team get runners-up in the Group B of the 2025–26 Women's First League season and finish the play-offs on the third place. With this achievement, her team was promoted to the topflight Women's Super League for the 2026–27 season.

== International career ==
Owusu was a member of the Ghana girls' national U17 team at the 2022 African U-17 Women's World Cup qualification.

She was admitted to the Ghana national team.

== Honours ==
=== Club ===
Turkish First League

Ünye Kadın
Winners (1): 2023-24

Haymana
Third places (1): 2025-26

=== Individual ===
Top goalscorer (1)
2021–22 Ghana Women's Premier League with Fabulous Ladies
