= Song Jae-eun =

South Korean footballer (born 1997)

Personal information
- Date of birth: April 3, 1997 (age 29)
- Height: 1.56 m (5 ft 1 in)
- Position: Midfielder

Team information
- Current team: Gangjin Swans
- Number: 24

Youth career
- 2011-2013: Oju Middle School
- 2014-2016: Dongsan High School
- 2017-2020: Korea University

Senior career*
Years	Team	Apps	(Gls)
2021-2025	Suwon FC	101	(7)
2026-	Gangjin Swans	1	(0)

International career^{‡}
2025-	South Korea	3	(0)
- * Club domestic league appearances and goals as of 04:46, 24 April 2026 (UTC) ‡ National team caps and goals as of 04:46, 24 April 2026 (UTC)

Song Jae-eun (Korean: 송재은) is a South Korean professional footballer who plays for WK League side Gangjin Swans and the South Korea national team. She played at the 2026 AFC Women's Asian Cup.

== Youth career ==
In her final year at Korea University, Song was the team's captain and won the MVP award at the 2020 KWFF Fall Championship.

== Club career ==
Song was selected by Suwon UDC in the second round of the 2021 WK League new players draft. She transferred to Gangjin Swans ahead of the 2026 season.

== International career ==
Song received her first call-up for South Korea in 2025 ahead of a pair of friendly matches in Europe. She was subsequently included in the squad for the 2026 AFC Women's Asian Cup, where she played in South Korea's group stage match against Iran.

== Honours ==
=== Suwon FC Women ===
- WK League
  - Champions: 2024
  - Runners-up: 2023
