= Kayseri Kadın FK =

- Full name: Kayseri Kadın Futbol Kulübü
- Founded: 2015; 11 years ago
- Ground: Vali Nihat Canpolat Sümer Facility
- Capacity: 500
- Coordinates: 38°45′02″N 35°30′36″E
- Chairman: (Turkey) Ünal Çankaya
- Manager: (Turkey) Enes Karakaya
- League: Turkish Women's Football Super League
- 2025-26: 1st of 8 Grup A (Promoted),Turkish Women's Football First League
Home colours	Away colours

Kayseri Kadın FK (Turkish: Kayseri Kadın Futbol Kulübü) is a women's football team based in Kayseri, Turkey playing in the Turkish Women's Football Super League. Following a sponsordeal the club's name is Karademir Grup Kayseri Kadın FK as of the 2026–27 season.

== History ==
They were formed in 2015 as part of the 1997-established Kayseri Gençler Birliği (literally: Kayseri Youth Union). The club's current chairman is Ünal Çankaya. The team was promoted from the Women's Second League after the 2019–20 season.

== Stadium ==
The team play home matches at Vali Nihat Canpolat Sümer Facility in Kocasinan district of Kayseri Province.

== Statistics ==
As of 9 March 2022.

Season	League	Rank	Pld	W	D	L	GF	GA	GD	Pts
2015–16	Third League - Gr. 7	2	18	14	1	3	87	12	+75	43
2016–17	Third League - Gr. 4	2	24	21	1	2	114	10	+104	64
2017–18	Third League - Gr. 12	2	8	6	0	2	37	14	+23	18
2018–19	Third League - Gr. 9	1	10	10	0	0	43	5	+38	30
2019–20	Second League	6 ^{1)}	14	9	4	1	37	6	+31	31
2020-21	First League Gr. D	7	4	1	3	0	3	4	-1	6
2021-22	Super League Gr. B	11 (^{2})	12	2	1	9	6	48	-42	7
Green marks a season followed by promotion, red a season followed by relegation.

- (^{1}): Promoted after the incomplete season by TFF decision according to point average
- (^{2}): Season in progress

== Current squad ==
As of 9 March 2022.

Head coach: (Turkey) Sercan Erdoğan

Note: Flags indicate national team as defined under FIFA eligibility rules; some limited exceptions apply. Players may hold more than one non-FIFA nationality.

No.	Pos.	Nation	Player
11	GK	TUR	İrem Barut
25	GK	TUR	Senem Servet İnci
6	DF	AZE	Pınar Ceri
13	DF	AZE	Alina Nahmadova
23	DF	AZE	Şeyma Nur Gencay
55	DF	AZE	Gulanbar Gasimova
17	MF	AZE	Sona Rahimova
18	MF	TUR	Rabia Behlül Koç
19	MF	AZE	Lamia Alizada
20	MF	TUR	Gülsüm Aygün
21	MF	AZE	Aysun Muradova
24	MF	NGR	Adebesi Adetoun Dosumu
27	MF	TUR	Ayşegül Elif Hemit
30	MF	TUR	Şehriban Dülek

No.	Pos.	Nation	Player
61	MF	TUR	Gülsüm Aygün
63	MF	KEN	Christine Nafula
60	FW	TUR	Birsen Bozbal
77	FW	TAN	Opah Clement
78	FW	TUR	Aybüke Aykul
2		TUR	Saniye Arslano
4		TUR	Gülşen Urgun
9		TUR	Şeyma Yücel
12		TUR	Melike Çalışkan
16		TUR	Canset Yiğit
26		TUR	İlayda Karakaya
36		TUR	İrem Karaday
38		TUR	Elmas Karakaya
99		TUR	Gizem Çetinkaya

== Notable former players ==
Azerbaijan

- Sona Rahimova

Kenya

- Christine Nafula

Nigeria

- Judith Okah

Turkey

- Narin Yakut
