= Gazikentspor =

Football club in Gaziantep, Turkey

- Full name: Gazikentspor Bayan Futbol Takımı
- Founded: 2006
- Ground: Batur Stadium
- Coordinates: 37°05′36″N 37°25′56″E
- Manager: Cesim Karalar
- League: Turkish Women's First Football League

Gazikentspor Women's Football Club (Turkish: Gazikentspor Bayan Futbol Takımı) is a women's football club based in Gaziantep, Turkey. Founded in 2006, the club is located in the Gazikent neighborhood of Şehitkamil district. The team manager is Cesim Karalar. The club's colors are red, green and white. The team play their home matches in the Gazikent Stadium within the Gazikent Sports Complex.

After defeating the Ankara-based Fomget Gençlik Spor in the second leg of the Women's Second League play-off match, the team was promoted to play in the 2014–15 season of Turkish Women's First Football League.

After playing two seasons in the First League, the team were relegated to the Second League.

== Stadium ==
Gazikentspor play their home matches at Batur Stadium in Gaziantep.

== Statistics ==
As of 11 March 2023.

Season	League	Pos.	Pld	W	D	L	GF	GA	GD	Pts
2008–09	Second League – Group 4	2	8	3	2	3	13	11	+2	11
2009–10	Regional League	8	18	5	1	12	44	63	−19	16
2010–11	Regional League	9	18	2	1	15	17	74	−57	7
2011–12	Second League – Group Southeastern Anatolia	2	8	5	1	2	40	11	+29	16
2012–13	Second League – Group 7	1	12	11	1	0	80	7	+73	34
2013–14	Second League Group 8	1	16	13	2	1	63	9	+54	41
2014–15	First League	8	18	4	2	12	18	68	−50	14
2015–16	First League	9	18	2	0	16	7	95	−88	6
2016–17	Second League Group 2	7 (^{3})	16	4	4	8	22	25	−3	16
2017–18	Second League Group B	6	14	3	3	8	16	26	−10	12
2018–19	Second League	11	28	10	1	17	32	68	−36	28 (^{2})
2019–20	Second League	9 (^{4})	15	5	2	8	30	29	+1	14 (^{2})
2021–22	Second League Group A	3 (^{5})	11	5	2	4	18	16	+2	17
2022–23	Second League Group A	0	0 (^{1})	0	0	0	0	0	0	0
Green marks a season followed by promotion, red a season followed by relegation.

- (^{1}): Season in progress
- (^{2}): Three points deducted due to no show-up in one match
- (^{3}): Fınished Group 2 on the last place, remained in the Second League aufter playouts
- (^{4}): Season discontinued due to COVID-19 pandemic in Turkey
- (^{5}): Fınished Group A on the third place, lost the play-off match to get promoted

== Current squad ==
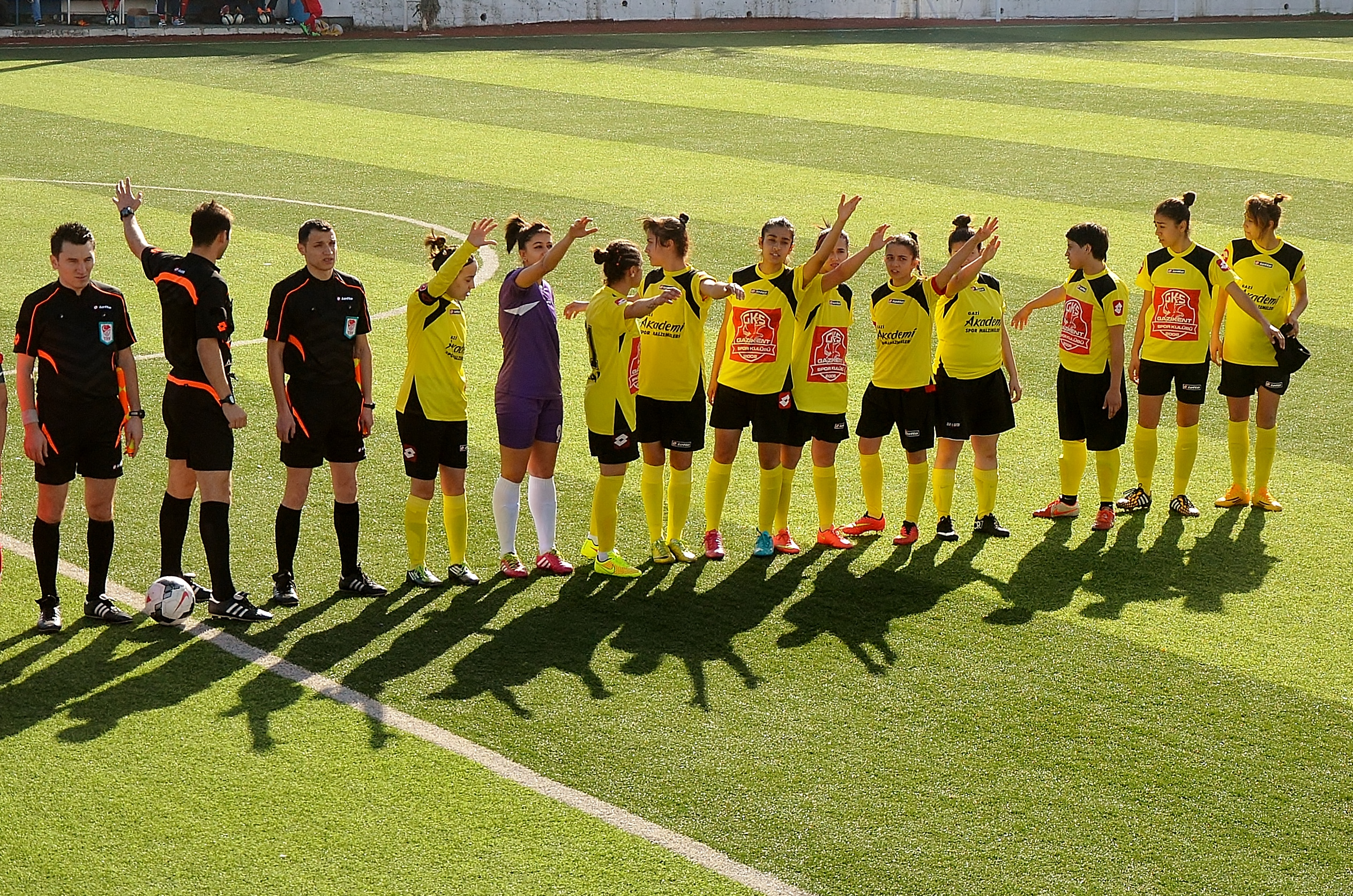
Gazikentspor squad in the 2014–15 season.

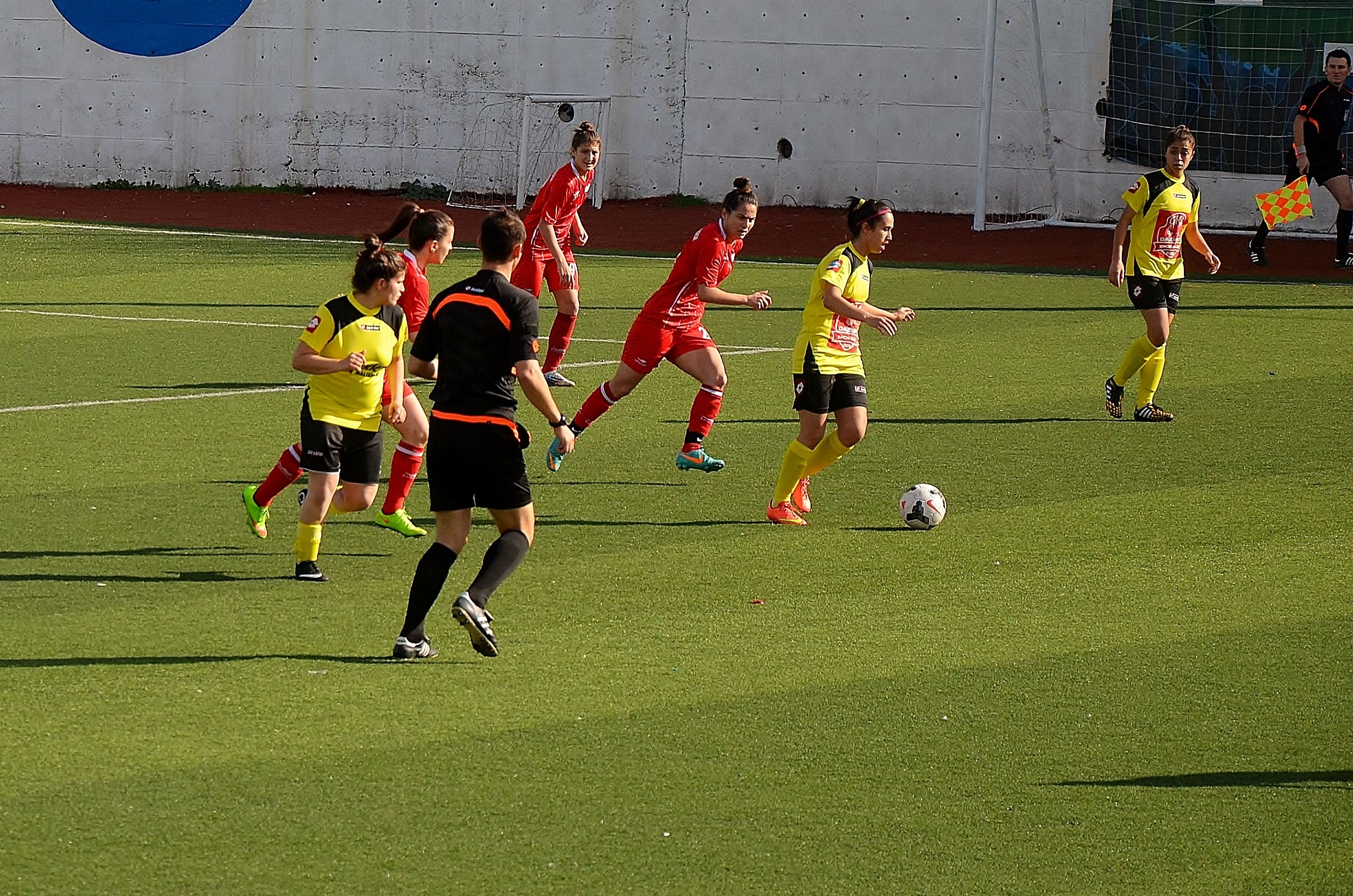
Gazikentspor (yellow/black) in the 2014–15 season away match against Ataşehir Belediyespor.

As of 7 May 2020.

Head coach: (Turkey) Casim Karalar

Note: Flags indicate national team as defined under FIFA eligibility rules; some limited exceptions apply. Players may hold more than one non-FIFA nationality.

No.	Pos.	Nation	Player
27	GK	TUR	Neslihan Kurt
1	DF	TUR	Münevver Öztürk
2	DF	TUR	Rukiye Ergül
3	DF	TUR	Ceren Özberk
4	DF	TUR	Fatma Kaynar
5	DF	TUR	Meryem Evin
8	DF	TUR	Pınar Can Demir
12	DF	TUR	Cemile Yılmaz
13	DF	TUR	Dilara Batur

No.	Pos.	Nation	Player
15	DF	TUR	Sevcan Teke
99	DF	TUR	Esra Deniz
7	MF	TUR	Çiğdem Sevincer
20	MF	TUR	Selin Songur
9	MF	TUR	Ceyda Özkan
18	FW	TUR	Emine Yılmaz
10		TUR	Kevser Sayıcı
25		TUR	Hilal Yassı

== Kit history ==
2014–15 away	2015–16 home	2015–16 away
