= Turkish Women's Football First League =

Turkish football competition

Women's First Football League Kadınlar 1. Futbol Ligi
- Founded: 1994
- Country: Turkey
- Divisions: 2
- Number of clubs: 16
- Level on pyramid: 1 (1993–2021); 2 (2022–)
- Promotion to: Women's Süper Lig
- Relegation to: Women's 2. Lig
- Current champions: Bakırköy
- Website: Official website
- Current: 2026–27 Turkish Women's Football First League

The Turkish Women's First Football League (Turkish: Kadınlar 1. Futbol Ligi) is the second-tier league competition for women's association football in Turkey. It was the first tier female football competition until the establishment of the Turkish Women's Football Super League in 2022.

== Format ==
In an effort to increase quality of the league, in the 2009–10 season two teams were relegated and four teams were promoted to the first league. Thus, the 2010–11 season consisted of twelve teams. Fashion One TV became the official media sponsor of the league for the 2010–11 season. At this time the league gained little attention in Turkey. After playing two groups with six teams and then having a championship and relegation group, the 2012–13 season was played as a double-round robin with ten teams again. The winner after 18 games was the champion and qualifies for the UEFA Women's Champions League, the bottom two teams get relegated. In 2016–17 there again was introduced a championship and relegation round after the regular season.

For the 2019–20 league season, the number of participating teams was increased from ten to twelve again after eight seasons. No relegation was planned to take place, so that the planned number of teams would be achieved with two promoted teams from the Women's Second League. However, Trabzon İdmanocağı had to be relegated since they did not show up in the entire previous season. To replace them, a third team from the Second League was promoted. All three women's leagues of the 2019-20 season were stopped on 8 March 2020 due to COVID-19 pandemic in Turkey.

Due to the Covid pandemic, the 2020–21 season of the Women's First Football League, after renaming the Turkcell Women's Football League, started with delay on 17 April 2021. The season was dedicated to healthcare workers, and named 2021 Turkish Turkcell Women's Football League Healthcare Workers' Season (Turkish: 2021 Sağlık Çalışanları Futbol Ligi). The league consisted of 16 teams, including all the 12 teams from the previous season and 4 teams promoted from the Second League's previous season. The teams were divided into four groups of four teams each, with one promoted team in each group. Each team in the group played only three matches in a round-robin tournament. The top two teams of the four groups play quarter-finals and semi-finals in Single-elimination tournament. The winner of the final match, on 4 May 2021, represented Turkey at the 2021–22 UEFA Women's Champions League.

As of 2024–25 Season, 17 teams (11 teams participated from First League, 3 teams relegated from Super League and 3 teams promoted from Second League in the end of 2023–24 season) compete for promoting to Super League.

Number of teams by season as a 1st tier competition (Turkish Football Federation)
Women's Football First League

2006–07	15
2007–08	25
2008–09	10
2009–10	10
2010–11	12
2011–12	12
2012–13	10
2013–14	8
2014–15	10
2015–16	10
2016–17	10
2017–18	10
2018–19	10
2019–20	12
2020–21	16

Total: 180

Number of teams by season as a 2nd tier competition
Women's Football First League

2022–23	13
2023–24	17
2024–25	17
2025–26	17
2026–27	16

Total: 80

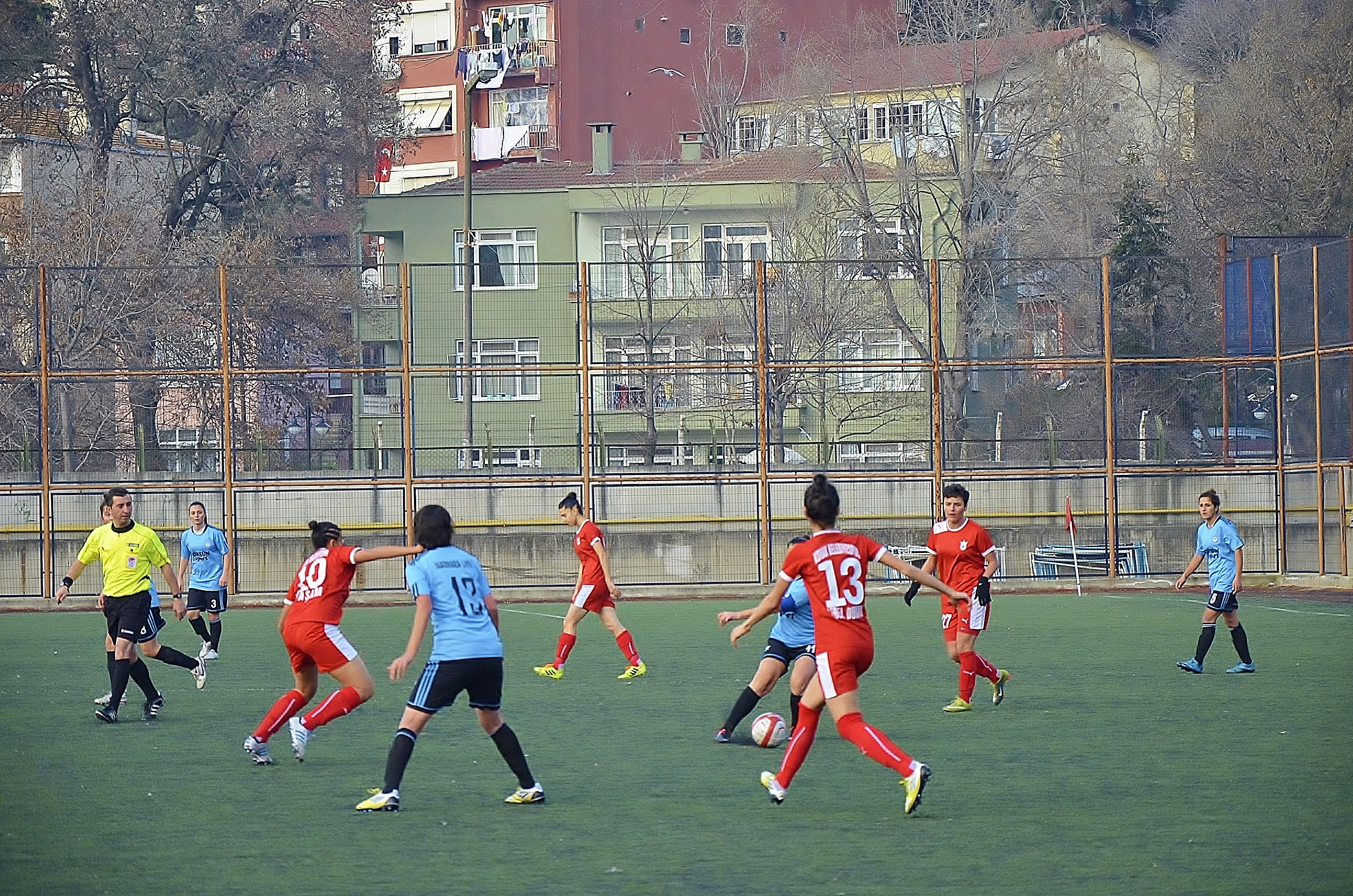
2013–14 Women's First League match Marmara Üniversitesispor (blue/black) vs Konak Belediyespor (red)

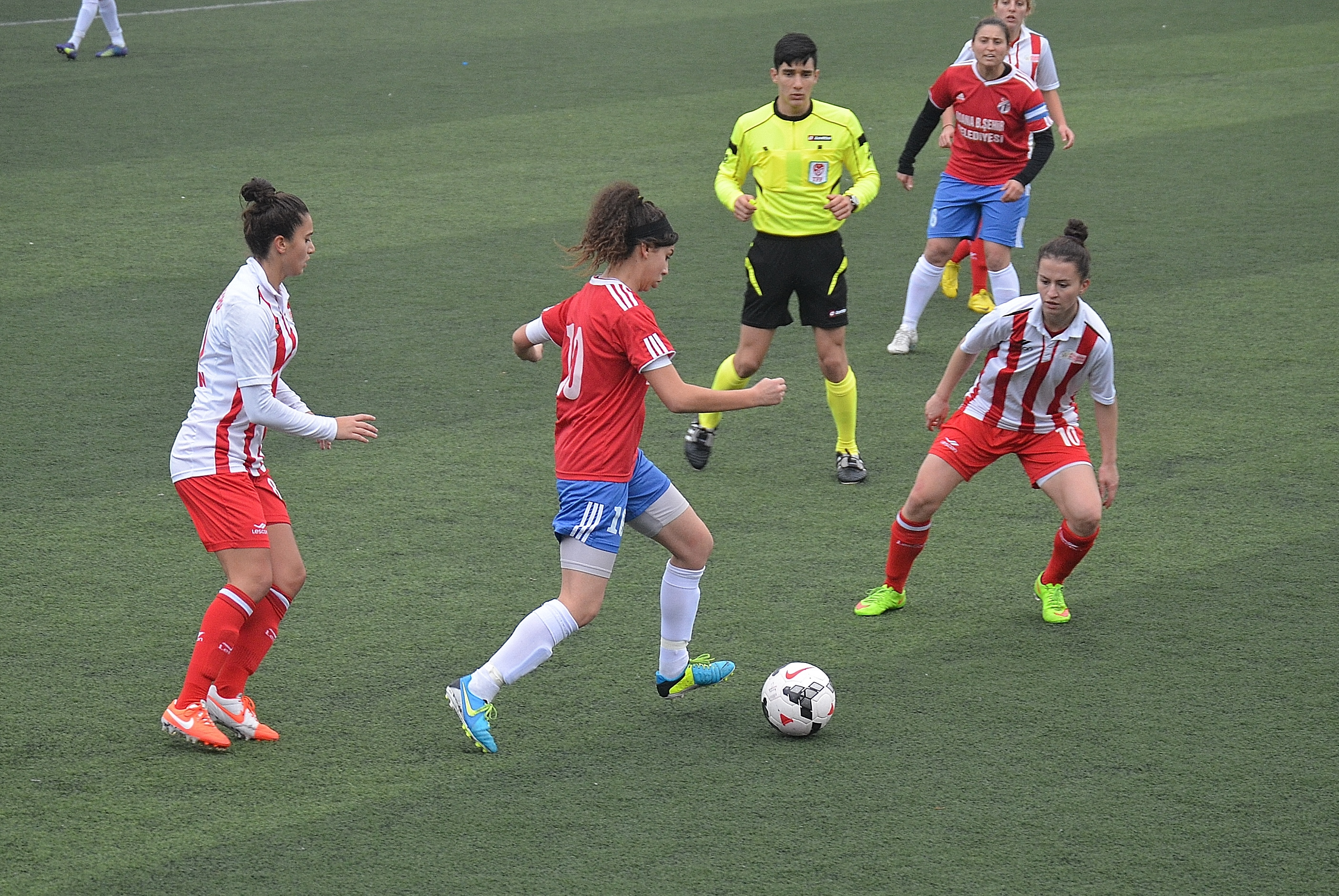
2014–15 Women's First League match Ataşehir Belediyespor (white/red) vs Adana İdmanyurduspor (red/blue)

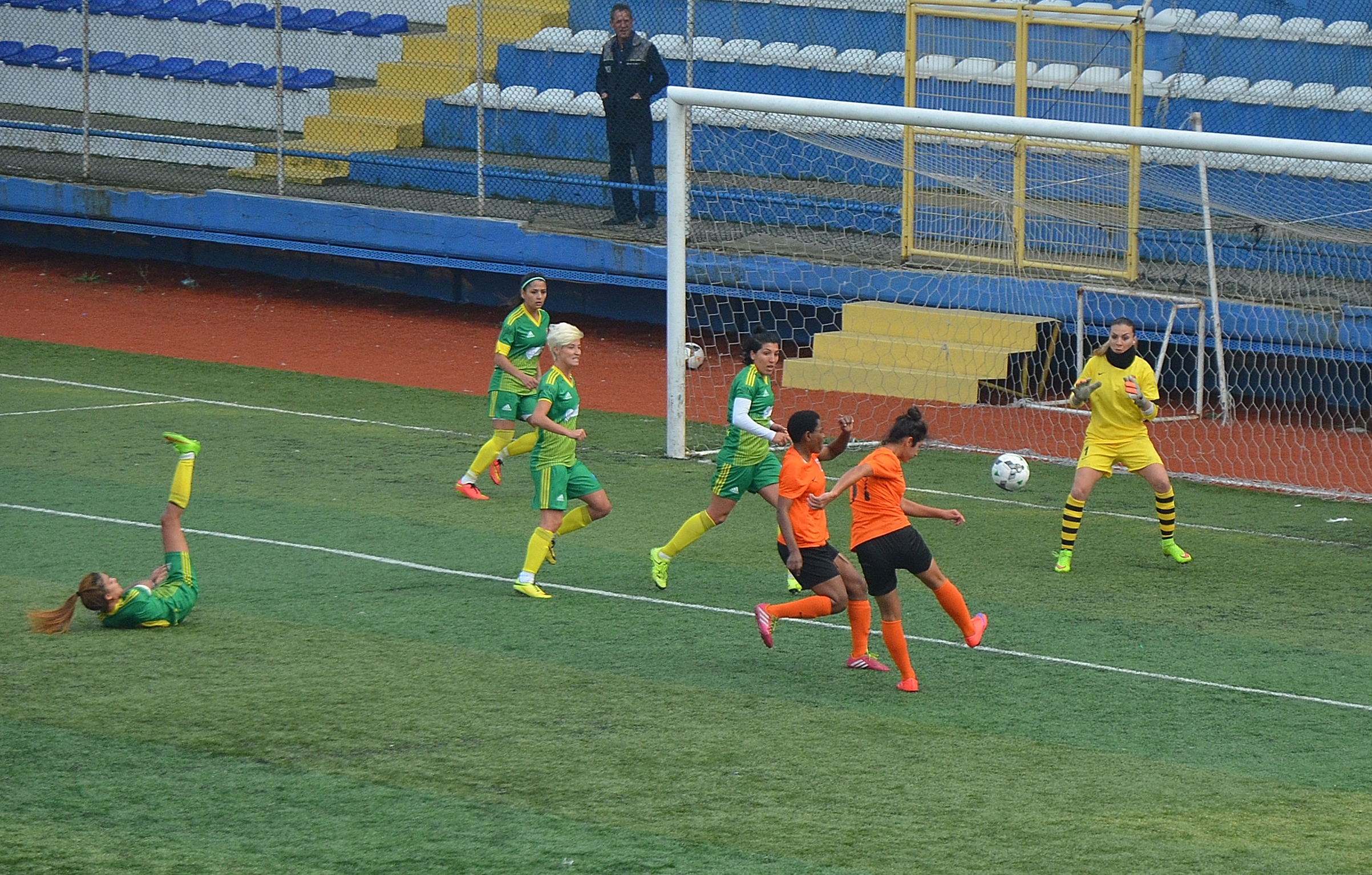
2015–16 Women's First League match Kireçburnu Spor (green/yellow) vs 1207 Antalya Muratpaşa Belediye Spor (orange/black)

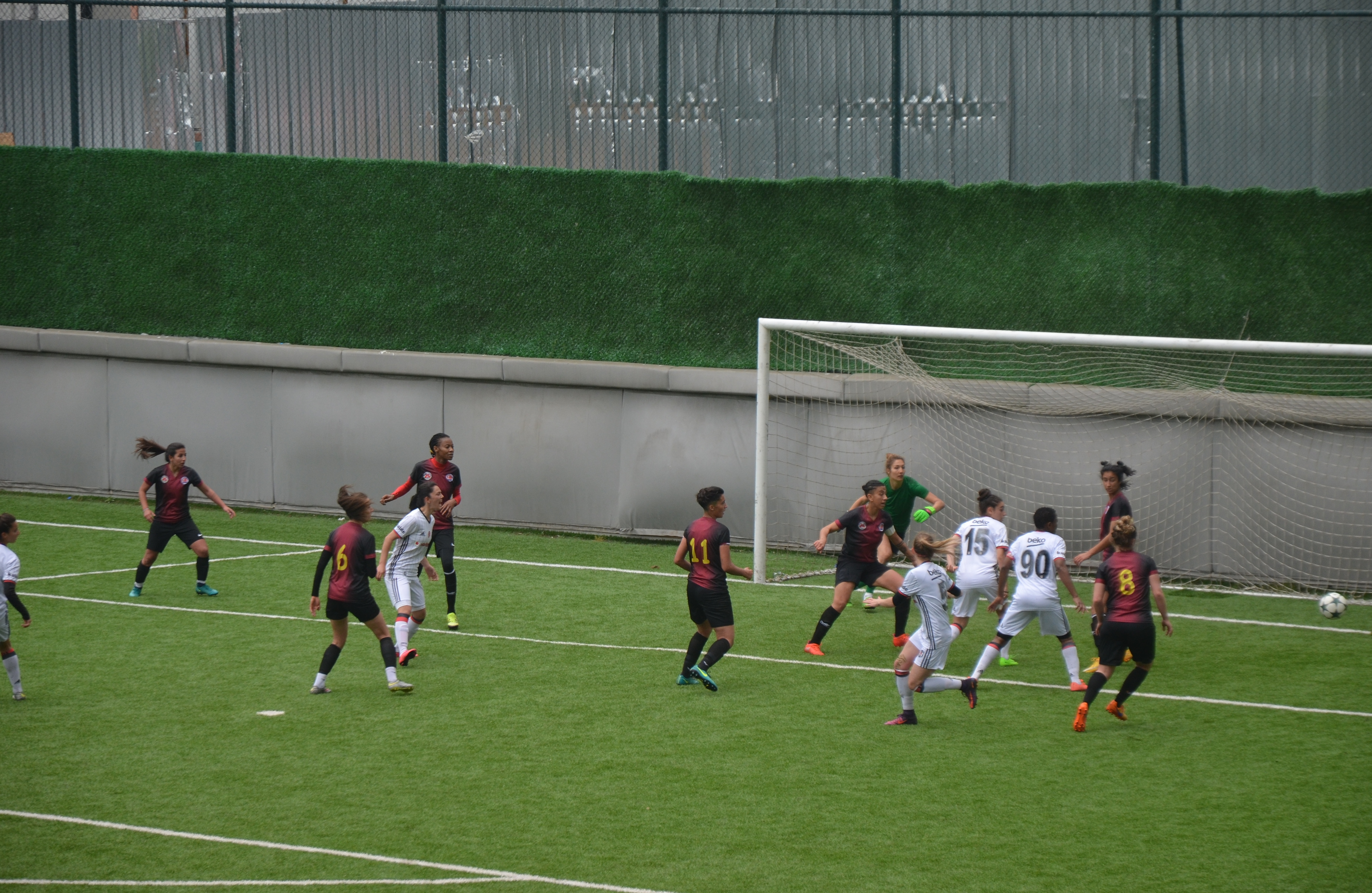
2016–17 Women's First League play-off match Beşiktaş J.K. (white) vs 1207 Antalya Döşemealtı Belediye Spor (navy/red/black)

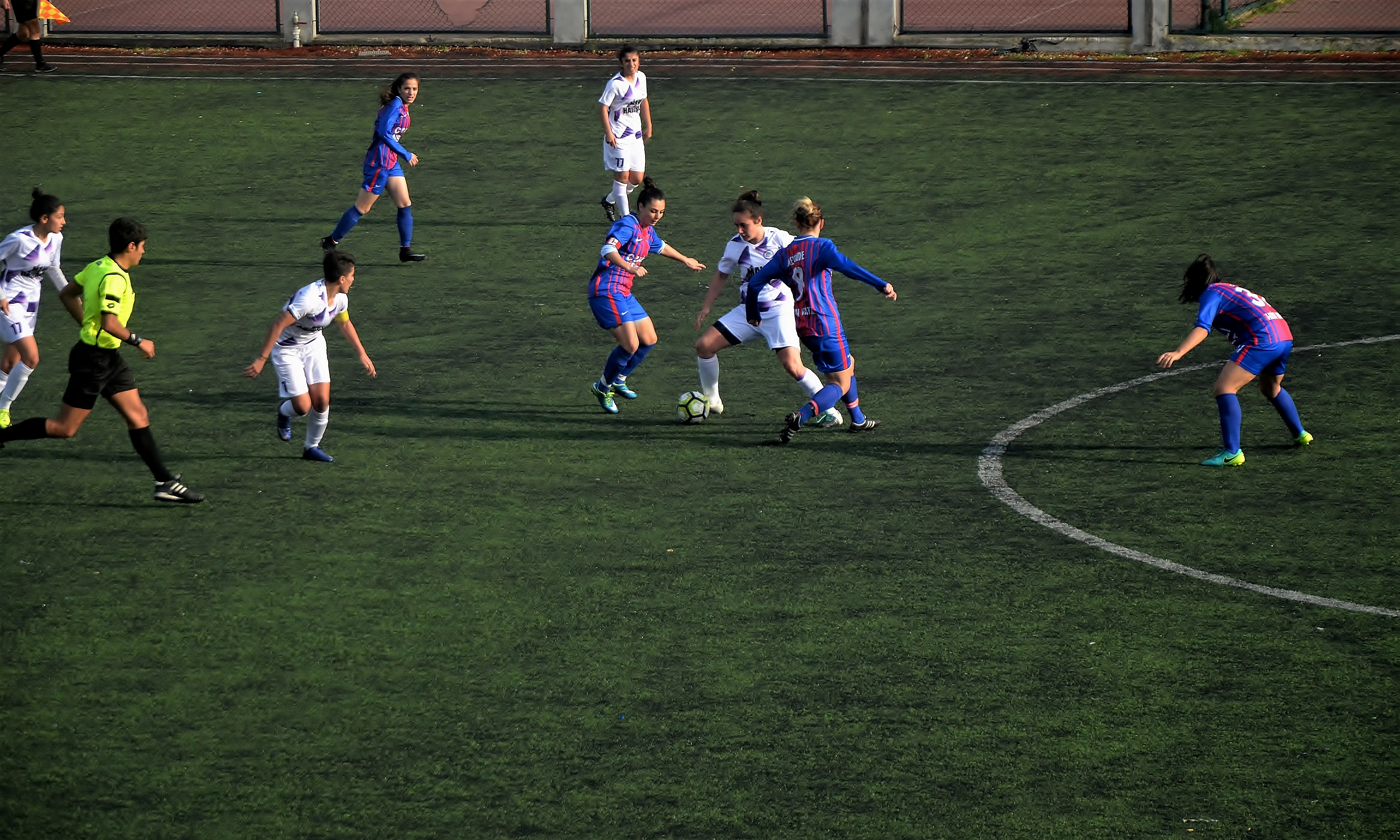
2017–18 Women's First League match Fatih Vatan Spor (blue/red) vs Kdz. Ereğli Belediye Spor (white)

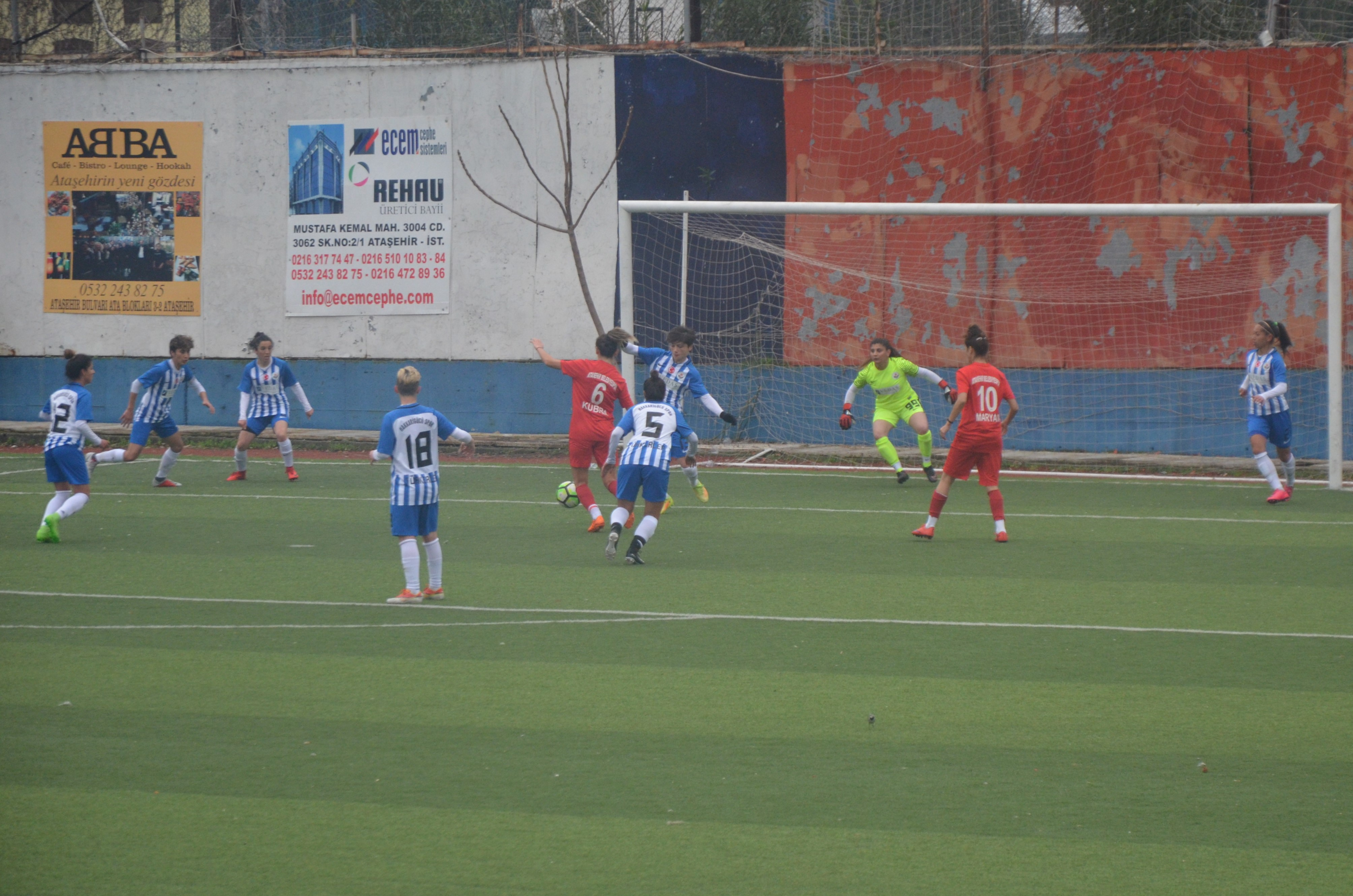
2018–19 Women's First League match Ataşehir Belediyespor (red) vs Hakkarigücü Spor (blue/white)

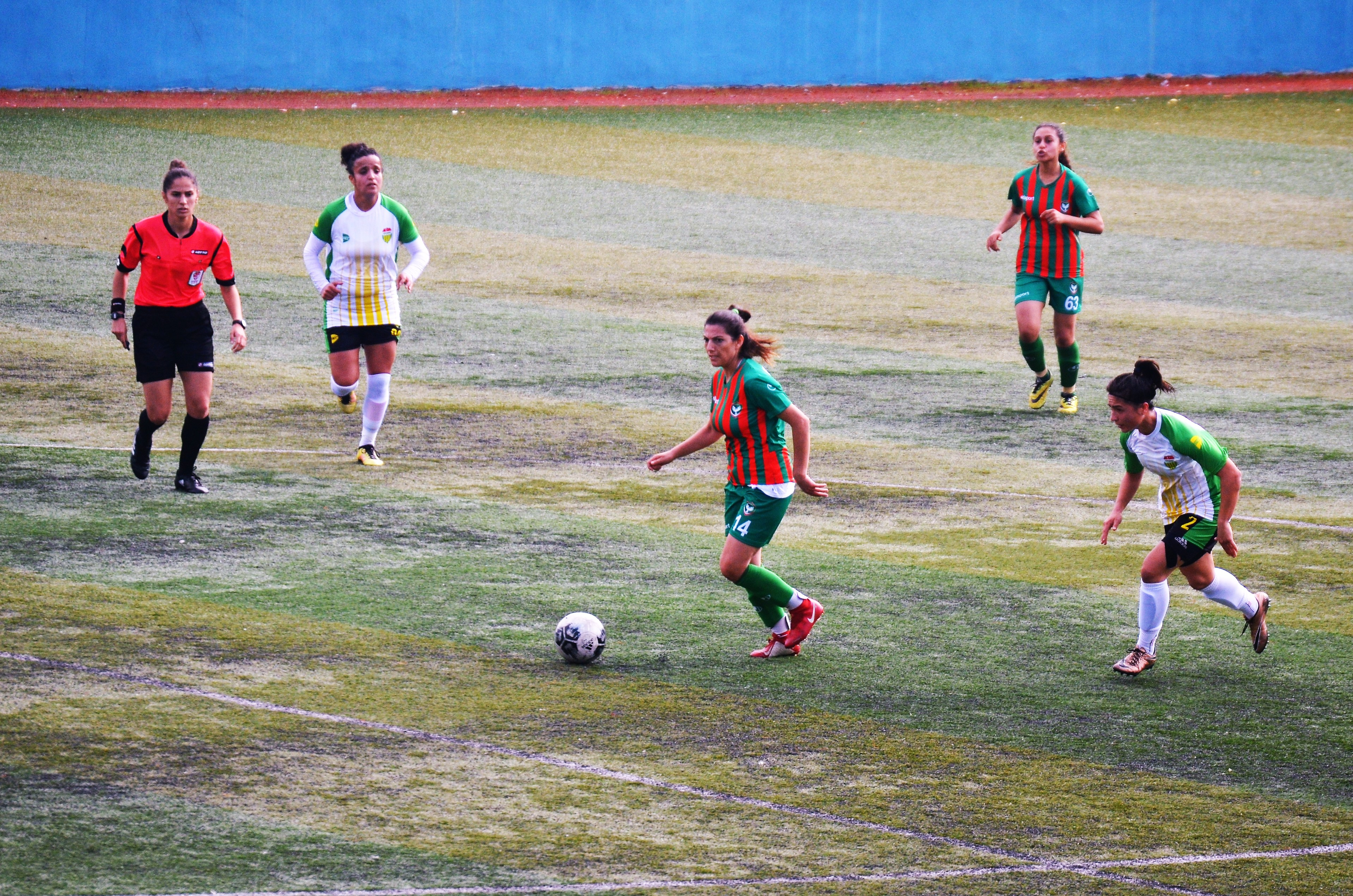
2019–20 Women's First League match Kireçburnu Spor (white/yellow/green/black) vs Amed S.K. (green/red)

== Past winners ==
Season	Champions	Runners-up
First tier
1994	Dinarsuspor	Acarlarspor
1994–95	Dinarsuspor	Acarlarspor
1995–96	Dinarsuspor	Gürtaşspor
1996–97	Dinarsuspor	İstanbul Sitespor
1997–98	Zara Ekinlispor	Adana Yataşspor
1998–99	Marshall Boyaspor	?
1999–00	Delta Mobilyaspor	?
2000–01	İstanbul Kuzeyspor	Zeytinburnuspor
2001–02	Zeytinburnuspor	Samsungücü
2002–03	Samsungücü	Gazi Üniversitesispor
2003–06	Season not held	
2006–07	Gazi Üniversitesispor	Mersin Camspor
2007–08	Gazi Üniversitesispor	Bucaspor
2008–09	Trabzonspor	Bucaspor
2009–10	Gazi Üniversitesispor	Trabzonspor
2010–11	Ataşehir Belediyespor	Konak Belediyespor
2011–12	Ataşehir Belediyespor	Kdz. Ereğlispor
2012–13	Konak Belediyespor	Ataşehir Belediyespor
2013–14	Konak Belediyespor	Ataşehir Belediyespor
2014–15	Konak Belediyespor	Ataşehir Belediyespor
2015–16	Konak Belediyespor	Ataşehir Belediyespor
2016–17	Konak Belediyespor	Beşiktaş
2017–18	Ataşehir Belediyespor	Beşiktaş
2018–19	Beşiktaş	ALG Spor
2019–20	Season discontinued due to COVID-19.	
2020–21	Beşiktaş	Fatih Vatanspor
Second tier
2021–22	Season not held	
2022–23	Pendik Çamlıkspor	Gaziantep Asyaspor
2023–24	Ünyegücü	Bornova Hitabspor
2024–25	Yüksekova	Giresun Sanayispor
2025–26	Bakırköy	Kayseri

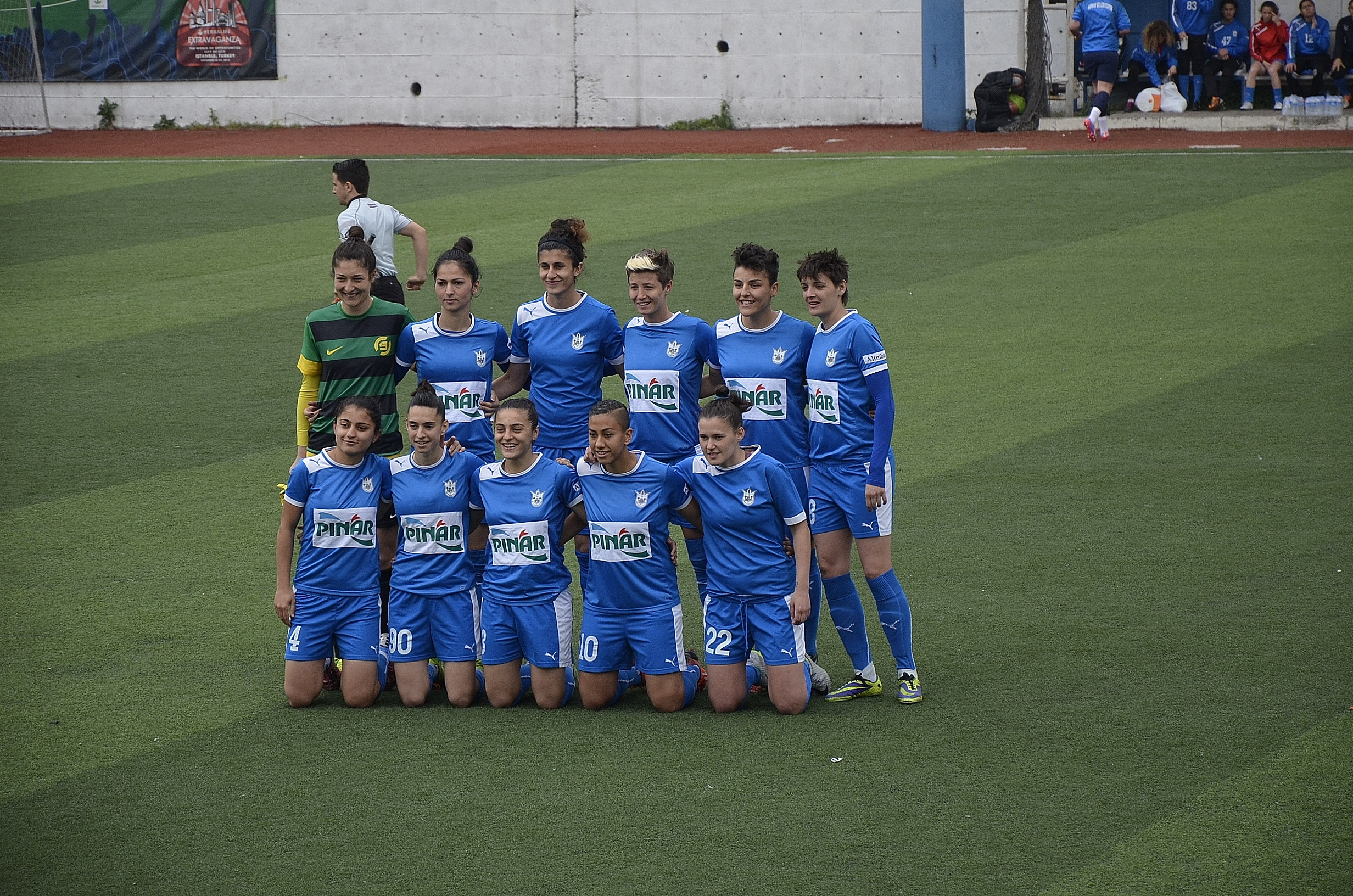
Konak Belediyespor(2013-14)

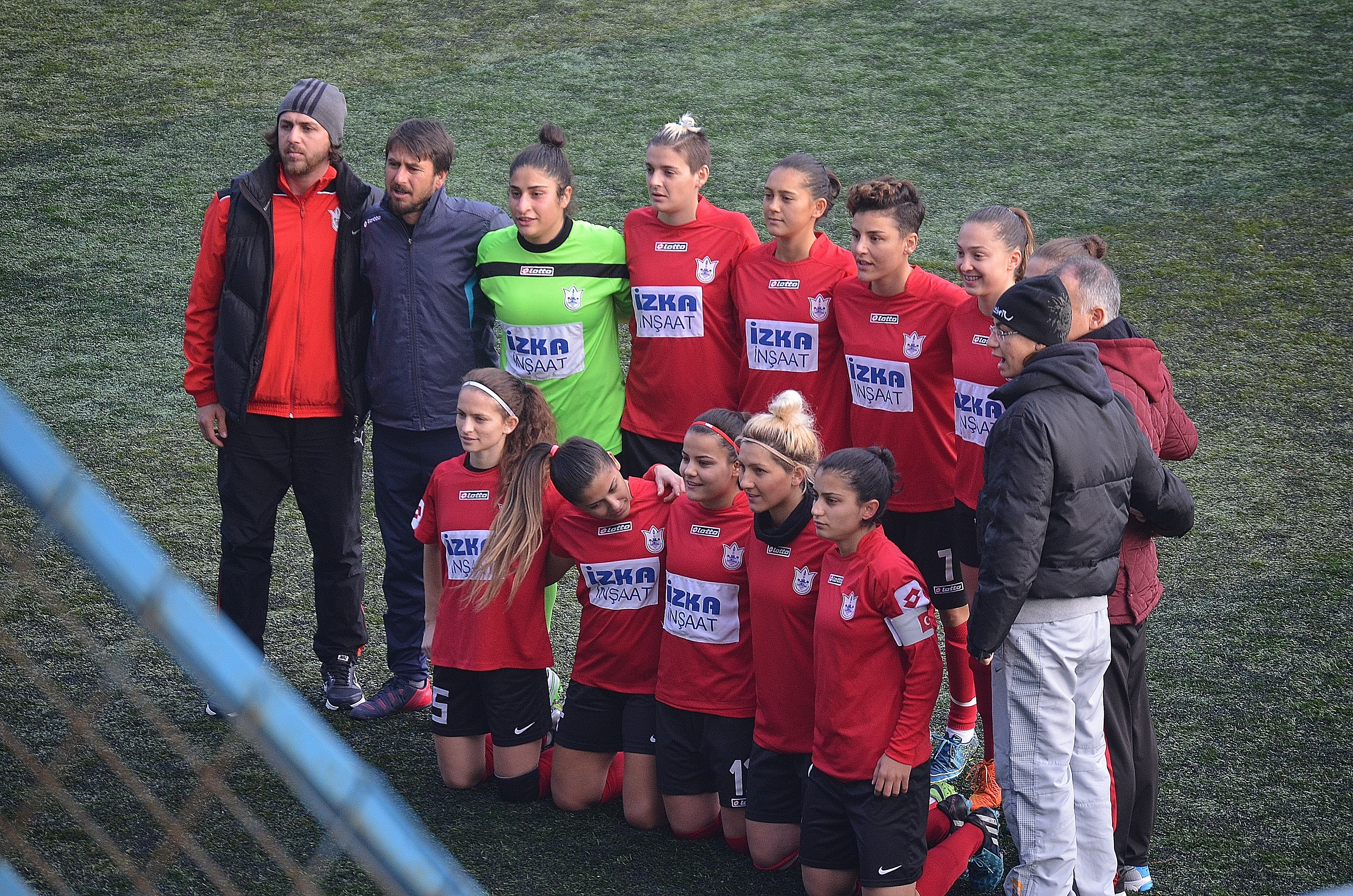
Konak Belediyespor(2015-16)

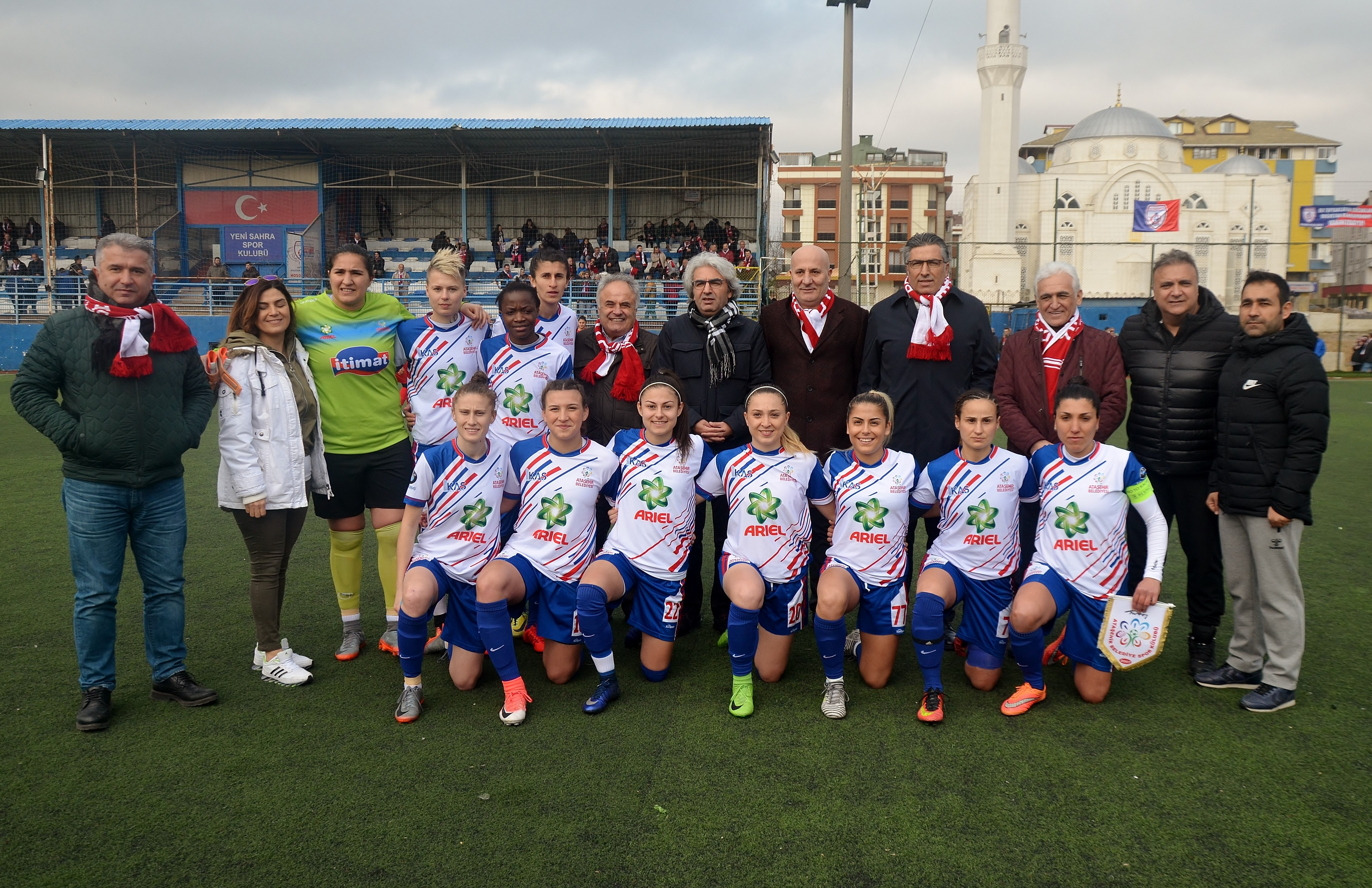
Ataşehir Belediyespor (2017-18)

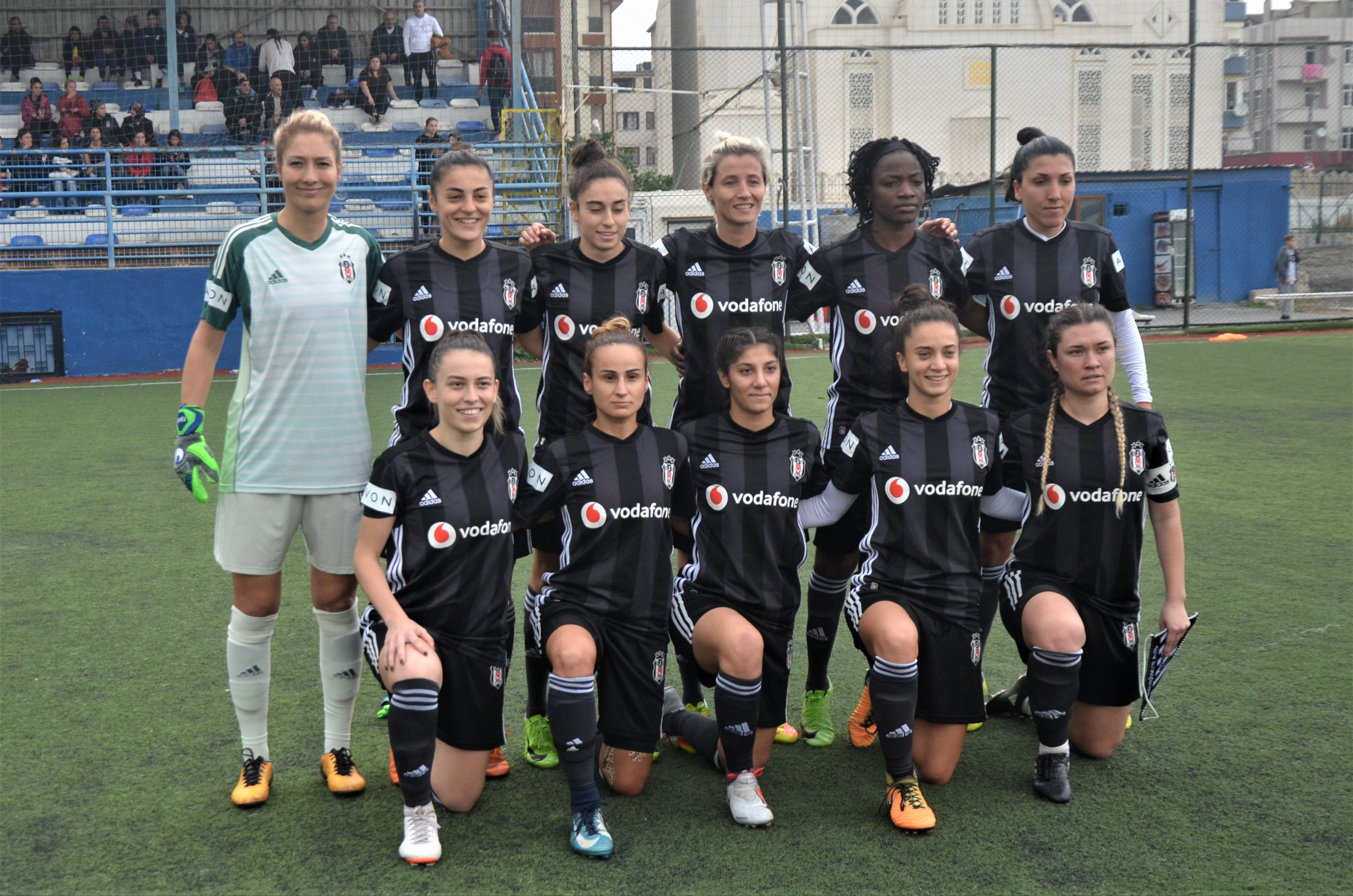
Beşiktaş J.K. (2018-19)

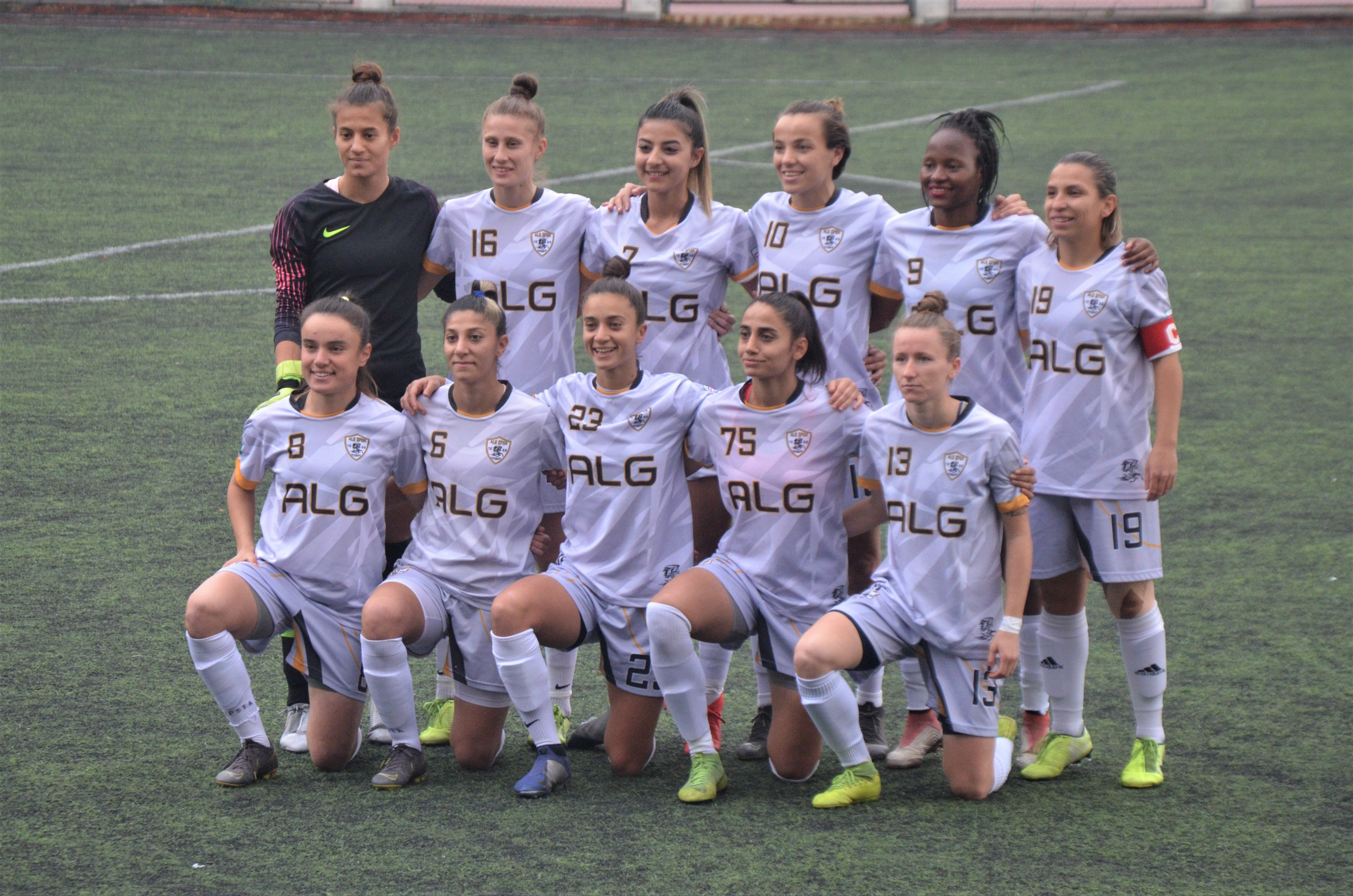
ALG Spor (2019-20)

== Top goalscorers ==
Season	Player	Club	Goals	Matches	Ratio
First tier
2009–10	(Turkey) Reyhan Şeker	Gazi Üniversitesispor	32	18	1.78
2010–11	(Turkey) Sevgi Çınar	Adana İdmanyurduspor	26	22	1.18
2011–12	(Turkey) Merve Aladağ	Ataşehir Belediyespor	27	21	1.29
2012–13	(Romania) Cosmina Dușa	Konak Belediyespor	32	17	1.88
2013–14	(Romania) Cosmina Dușa	Konak Belediyespor	15	18	0.83
2014–15	(Romania) Cosmina Dușa	Konak Belediyespor	33	17	1.94
2015–16	(Turkey) Arzu Karabulut	Trabzon İdmanocağı	23	17	1.35
2016–17	(Turkey) Sevgi Çınar	Konak Belediyespor	24	22	1.09
2017–18	(Turkey) Kader Hançar	Konak Belediyespor	30	19	1.58
2018–19	(Tunisia) Mariem Houij	Ataşehir Belediyespor	15	16	0.94
2019–20	(Turkey) Yağmur Uraz	Beşiktaş J.K.	27	15	1.8
2020–21	(Turkey) Zelal Baturay	Fatih Vatan Spor	7	6	1.17
Second tier
2022–23	(Brazil) Giovânia	Gaziantep Asyaspor	36	30	1.2
2023–24	(Turkey) Zeynep Bilir	Kayseri	18	12	1.5
2024–25	(Turkey) İrem Yılmaz	Giresun Sanayispor	28	19	1.47
2025–26	(Nigeria) Kafayat Bashiru	Kayseri	44	17	2.59

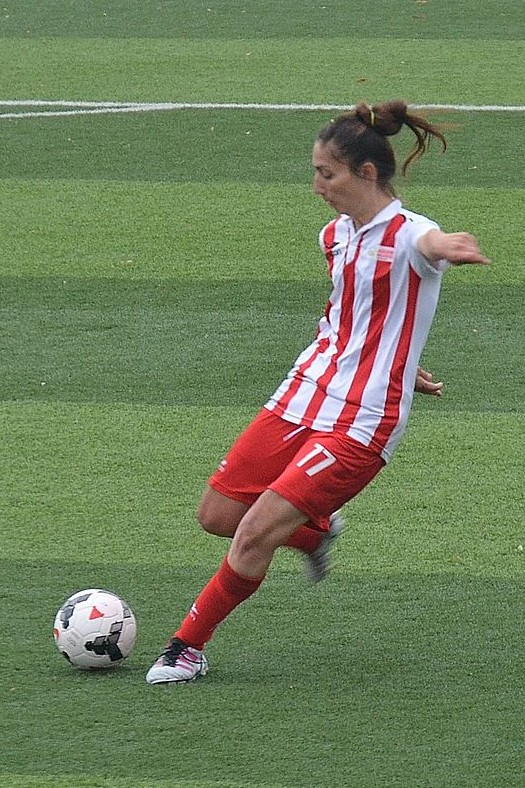
Reyhan Şeker

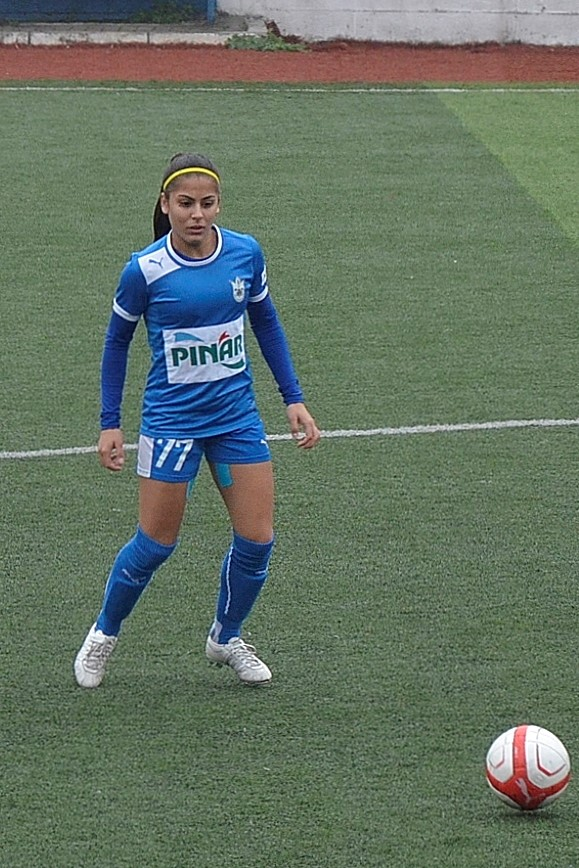
Sevgi Çınar

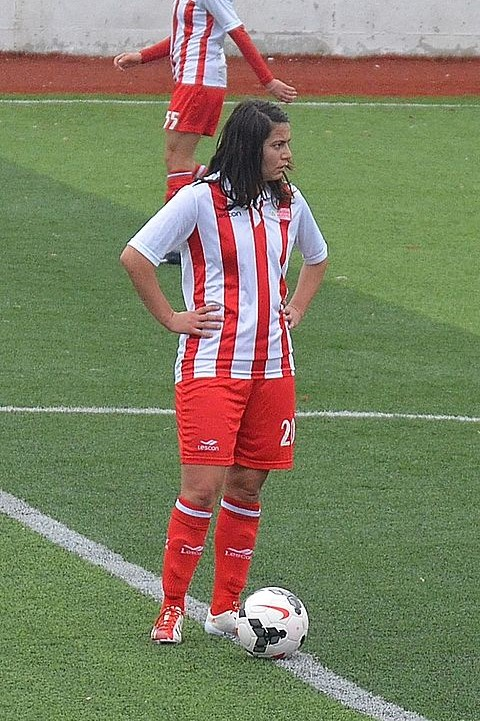
Merve Aladağ

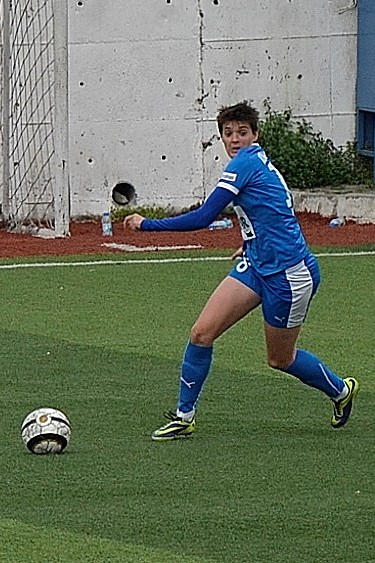
Cosmina Dușa

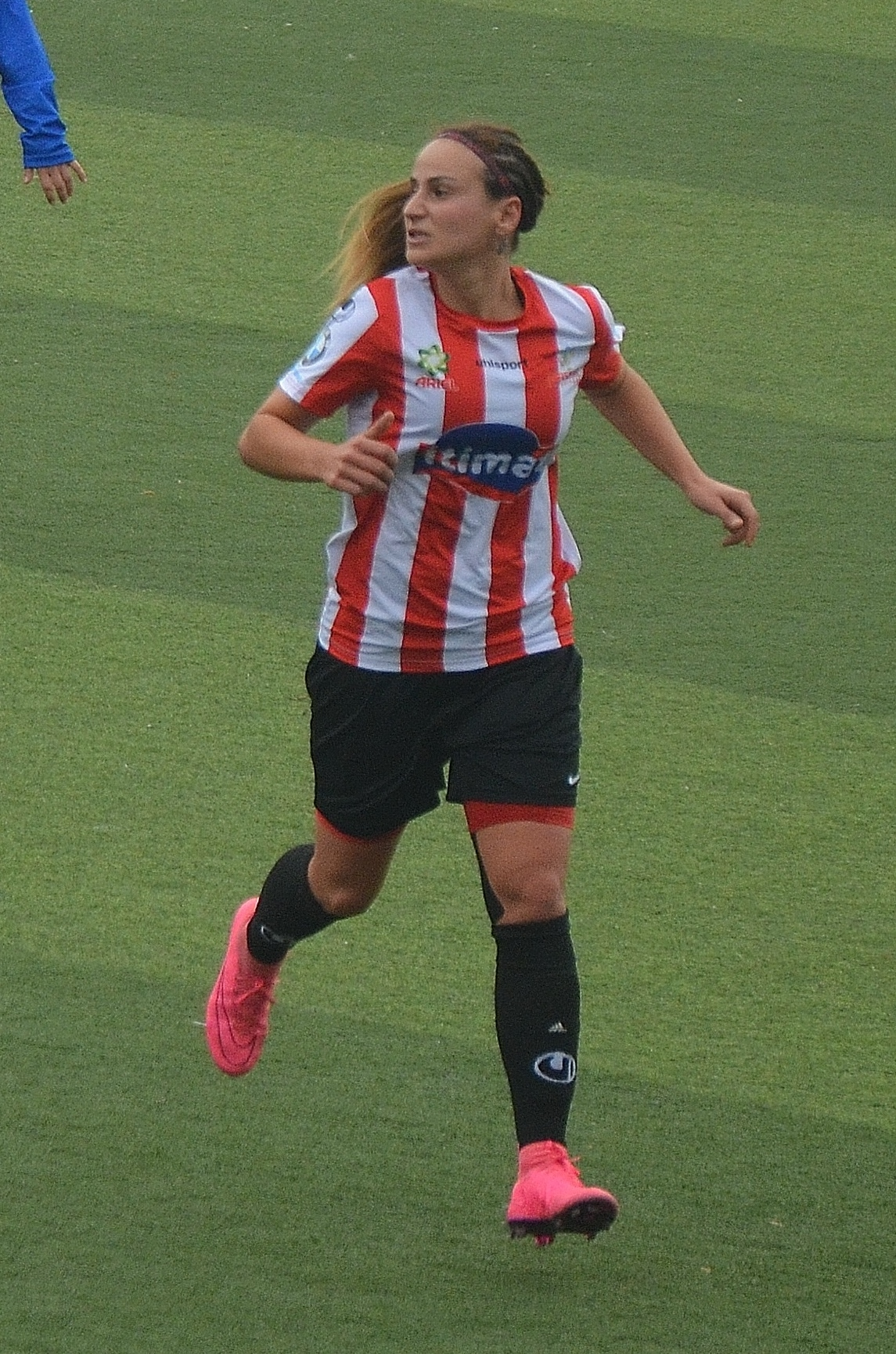
Arzu Karabulut

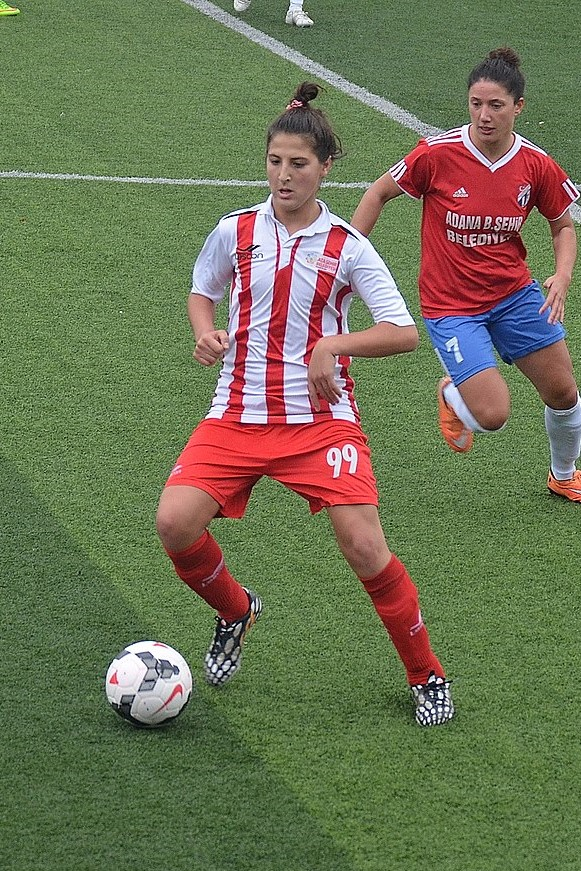
Kader Hançar

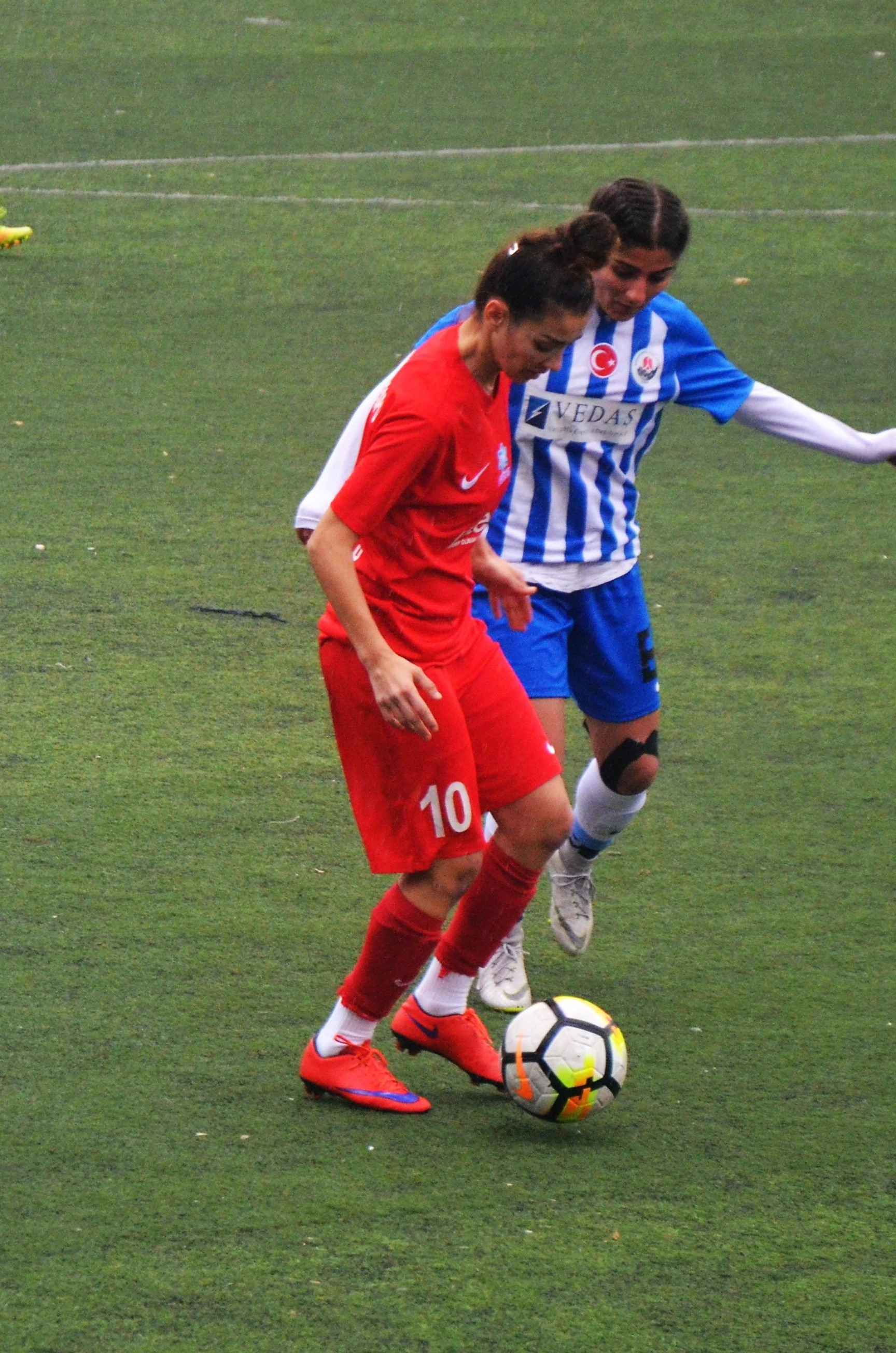
Mariem Houij

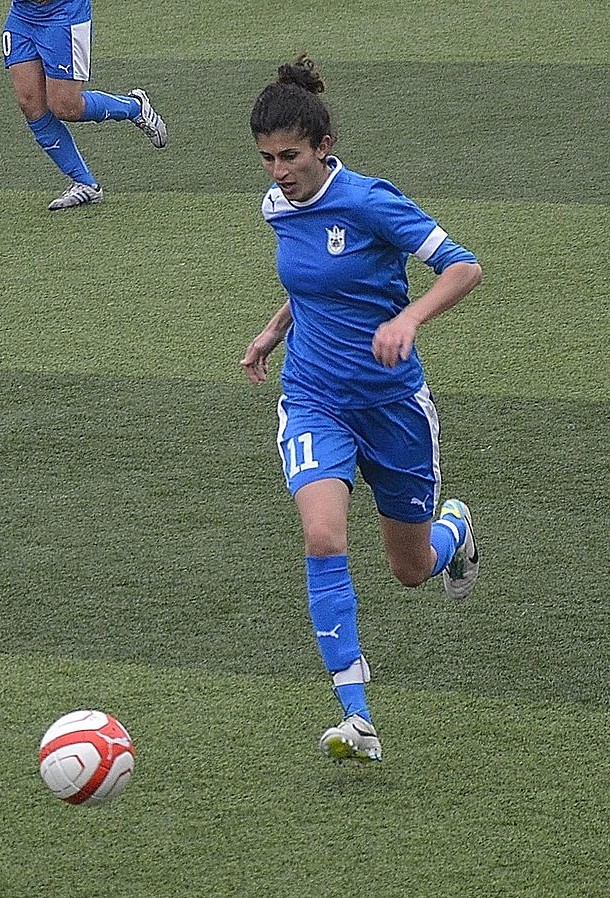
Yağmur Uraz

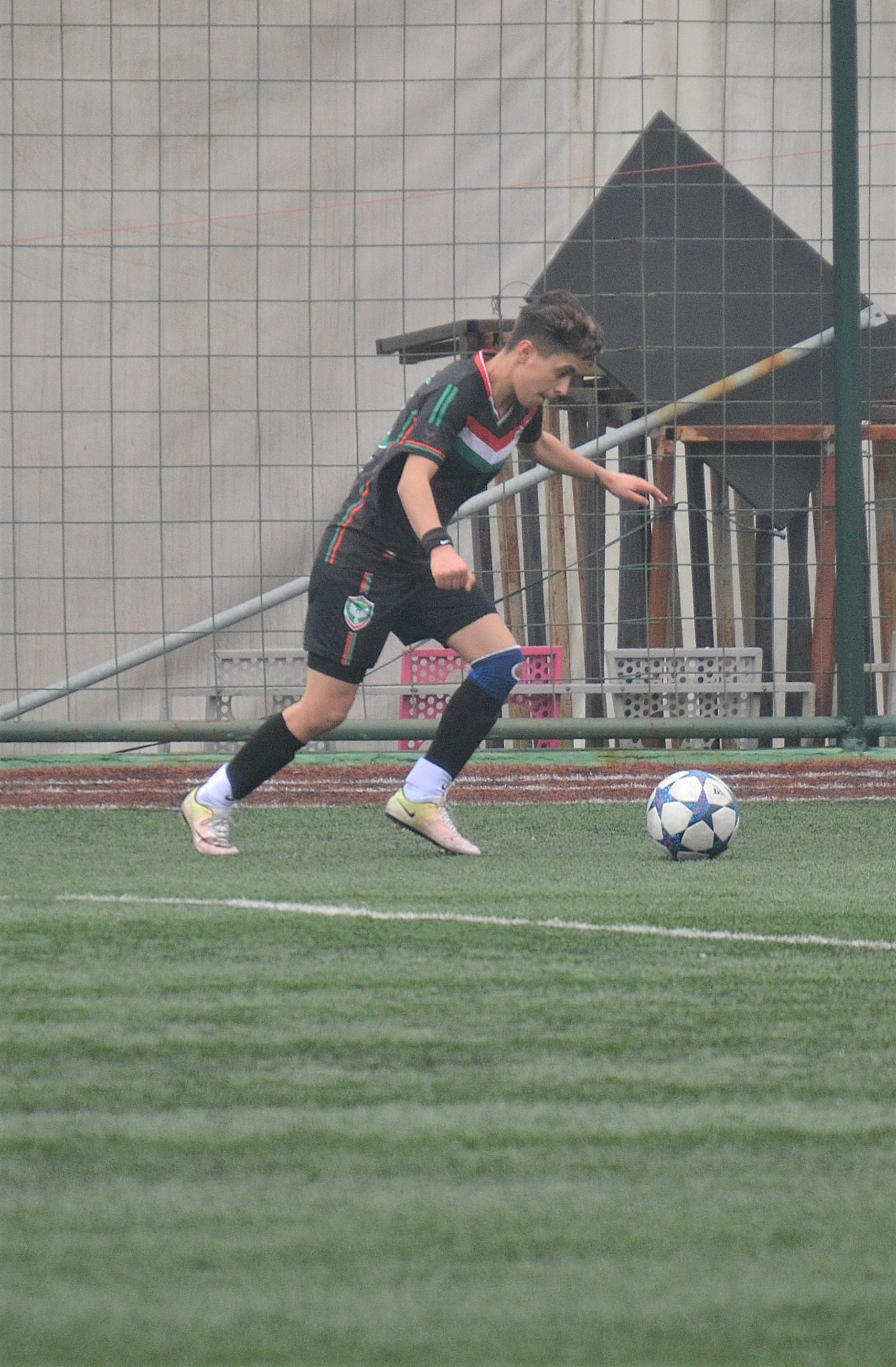
Zelal Baturay

== Teams promoted to Women's Super League ==
Season	Teams
2022–23	Pendik Çamlıkspor, Gaziantep Asyaspor
2023–24	Ünyegücü, Bornova Hitabspor
2024–25	Yüksekova, Giresun Sanayispor, 1207 Antalyaspor
2025–26	Kayseri, Bakırköy, Haymana

== See also ==
- Women's football in Turkey
- Turkish Women's Football Super League
- Turkish Women's Second Football League
- Turkish Women's Third Football League
- Turkish Women's Regional Football League
- List of women's football clubs in Turkey
- Turkish women in sports
