= Football in Turkey =

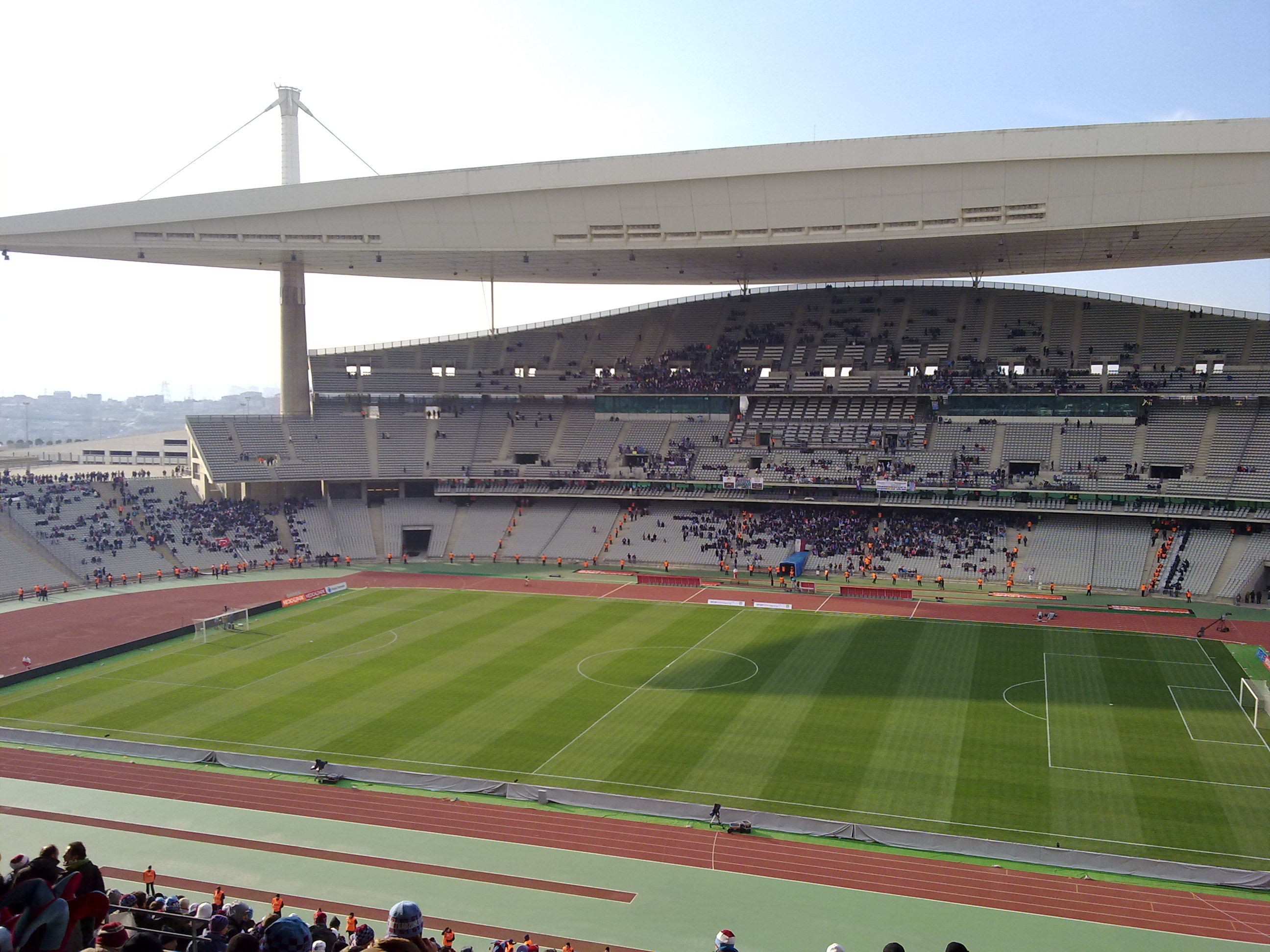
- Atatürk Olympic Stadium has a capacity of 74,753 spectators.
- Country: Turkey
- Governing body: TFF
- National team: Turkey
- First played: 1898; 128 years ago

National competitions
- Leagues; Men's: Süper Lig; TFF First League; TFF Second League; TFF Third League; Women's: Women's Super League; Women's First League; Women's Second League; Women's Third League; Cups; Turkish Cup; Turkish Super Cup

International competitions
- Club; Men's: FIFA Club World Cup; FIFA Intercontinental Cup; UEFA Champions League; UEFA Europa League; UEFA Conference League; UEFA Super Cup; Women's: UEFA Women's Champions League; National team; Men's: FIFA World Cup; UEFA European Championship; UEFA Nations League; Women's: FIFA Women's World Cup; UEFA Women's Championship; UEFA Women's Nations League

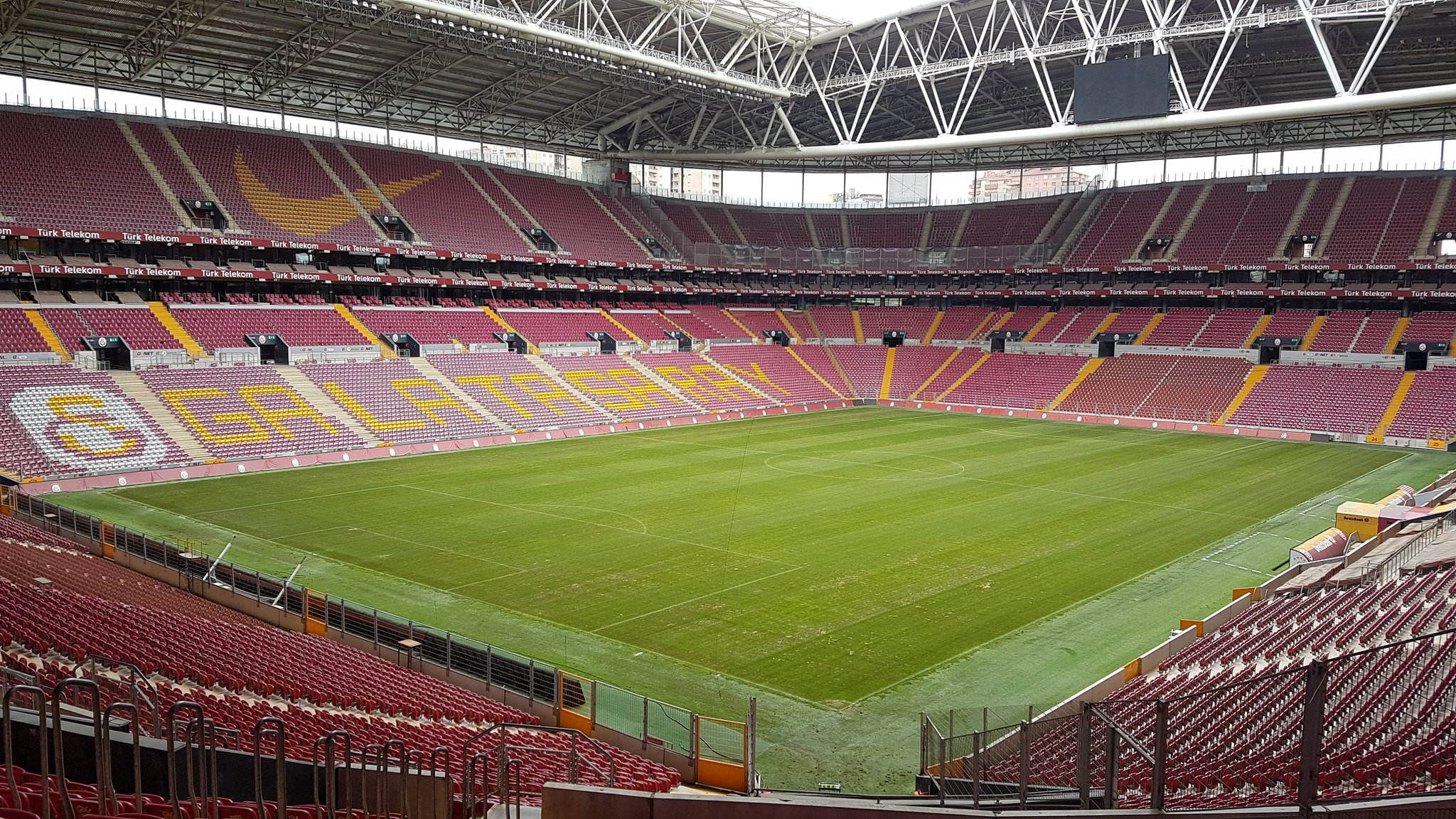
Rams Park is home stadium of club Galatasaray.

Football is the most popular sport in Turkey, followed by basketball, tracing its roots to the Ottoman Empire. Approximately three-quarters of the Turkish people are interested in football.

The first matches were played in Ottoman Salonica in 1875. The sport was introduced by English residents. The Turkish football league system comprises five professional leagues, one of which is dedicated to female athletes.

== League system ==
=== Süper Lig ===
The Süper Lig (Super League) is the top division in Turkey since 1959. There are 18 clubs in the league (as of 2025–26 season). The league ushered in clubs from all over Turkey to compete with each other. Currently, clubs finishing in the top four places in the league enter qualifying rounds of European competitions, and the winners of the Turkish Cup, if not one of the top four, are also given a spot. Each season, the four teams with the least points are relegated to the TFF First League. A total of 75 clubs have competed in the Süper Lig, but only six clubs have been champions so far: Galatasaray, Fenerbahçe, Beşiktaş, Trabzonspor, Başakşehir and Bursaspor. Galatasaray has won the most Süper Lig trophies with 25 trophies (the club has also won more Turkish Cups and Turkish Super Cups than any other team).

The most popular Süper Lig clubs on X as of 6 May 2025:

#	Football club	City	Followers
1	Galatasaray	Istanbul	16.2 million
2	Fenerbahçe	Istanbul	13.7 million
3	Beşiktaş	Istanbul	6.2 million
4	Trabzonspor	Trabzon	2.1 million

=== Reserve leagues ===
Clubs in the Turkish football league system do not have reserve teams with the exception of Genclerbirligi and Altinordu. Hacettepe SK is the reserve side of Genclerbirligi, and Nigde Anadolu FK is of Altinordu. Other clubs have U21 and U18 teams which compete outside the main league system.

=== Amateur football ===
Below the four professional leagues in Turkish football are amateur leagues. Amateur football clubs include:

- Seniors’ First Amateur League: 2145 clubs
- Seniors’ Second Amateur League: 1743 clubs
- Seniors’ Third Amateur League: 1 club
- Women's League: 9 clubs
- Juniors’ First Amateur League: 27 clubs
- Juniors’ Second Amateur League: 100 clubs
- Juniorsclubs
  - Antalya: 10 clubs
  - Bursa: 16 clubs
  - Istanbul: 18 clubs
  - İzmir: 12 clubs
  - Diyarbakır: 7 clubs
  - Trabzon: 13 clubs
  - Samsun: 10 clubs

Amateur clubs are put into leagues included in the Amateur League system and are eligible for promotion to the Turkish Third League.

== Largest football stadiums in Turkey ==
#	Image	Stadium	Capacity	City	Home team(s)	Opened
1		Atatürk Olympic Stadium	74,753	Istanbul	Turkey	2002
2		Ali Sami Yen Spor Kompleksi	53,978	Istanbul	Galatasaray SK	2011
3		İzmir Atatürk Stadium	51,337	İzmir	Karşıyaka SK	1971
4		Şükrü Saracoğlu Stadium	47,430	Istanbul	Fenerbahçe SK	1908
5		Bursa Metropolitan Municipality Stadium	43,361	Bursa	Bursaspor	2015
6		Beşiktaş Stadium	42,590	Istanbul	Beşiktaş JK	2016
7		Konya Metropolitan Municipality Stadium	42,000	Konya	Konyaspor	2014
8		Şenol Güneş Sports Complex	40,782	Trabzon	Trabzonspor	2017
9		Kocaeli Stadium	34,829	İzmit	Kocaelispor	2018
10		Samsun 19 Mayıs Stadium	33,919	Samsun	Samsunspor	2017

== Cup competitions ==
The two major cup competitions are the Turkish Cup and Turkish Super Cup. The Turkish Cup includes clubs from every division. The Super Cup is an annual match held between the winners of the Süper Lig and Turkish Cup.

Now-defunct Turkish cup competitions include the Prime Minister's Cup, Atatürk Cup, Istanbul Football Cup and Spor Toto Cup.

== Qualification for European competitions ==
As of 2025-26 season

Competition	Who Qualifies	Notes
UEFA Champions League league phase	Club finishing 1st in the Süper Lig	
UEFA Champions League play-off round	Club finishing 2nd in the Süper Lig	
UEFA Europa League second qualifying round	Club finishing 3rd in the Süper Lig	
UEFA Europa Conference League second qualifying round	Club finishing 4th in the Süper Lig	
UEFA Europa League play-off round	Winner of the Turkish Cup	If the winner is already guaranteed a place in Europe, the highest ranked club in Süper Lig which did not qualify to UEFA Champions League will replace them.

In addition, once in a European competition, it becomes possible to qualify for others:

- All the losers of the Champions League third qualifying round go forward to the UEFA Europa League Play-off round
- All the losers of the Champions League play-off round go forward to the UEFA Europa League group stage

== European competition records ==
The following teams have made the last eight of European competitions:

=== UEFA Super Cup ===
- Galatasaray (2000 – Champions)

=== European Cup / UEFA Champions League ===
- Galatasaray (1988–89 – Semi-finals)
- Galatasaray (1962–63 – Quarter-finals)
- Galatasaray (1969–70 – Quarter-finals)
- Besiktaş (1986–87 – Quarter-finals)
- Galatasaray (1993–94 – Group stage)^{‡}
- Galatasaray (2000–01 – Quarter-finals)
- Fenerbahçe (2007–08 – Quarter-finals)
- Galatasaray (2012–13 – Quarter-finals)

^{‡ Galatasaray was one of the eight teams in the group stage of the 1993–94 UEFA Champions League, however, UEFA does not consider this a quarter-final participation.}

=== UEFA Cup / Europa League ===
- Galatasaray (1999–00 – Champions)
- Fenerbahçe (2012–13 – Semi-finals)
- Besiktaş (2002–03 – Quarter-finals)
- Besiktaş (2016–17 – Quarter-finals)

=== UEFA Europa Conference League ===
- Fenerbahçe ( 2023-24 – Quarter-finals)

=== Inter-Cities Fairs Cup ===
- Göztepe (1968–69 – Semi-finals)

=== Balkans Cup ===
- Fenerbahçe (1966–67 – Champions)
- Sarıyerspor (1991–92 – Champions)
- Samsunspor (1993–94 – Champions)
- Eskişehirspor (1975 – Runners-up)

=== UEFA Cup Winners Cup ===
- Fenerbahçe (1963–64 – Quarter-finals)
- Göztepe (1969–70 – Quarter-finals)
- Bursaspor (1974–75 – Quarter-finals)
- Galatasaray (1991–92 – Quarter-finals)

=== UEFA Intertoto Cup ===
- Kayserispor (2006 – Joint Winners)
- Trabzonspor (2007 – Runners-up)
- Sivasspor (2008 – Runners-up)
- İstanbulspor (1997 – Semi-finals)
- Samsunspor (1998 – Semi-finals)
- Trabzonspor (1999 – Semi-finals)
- Bursaspor (1995 – Quarter-finals)

== Turkey national team ==
The Turkey national team made its debut on October 26, 1923. The match ended in a 2–2 draw against the Romania. Turkey have qualified for the FIFA World Cup twice: 1954 and 2002. Their longest duration of competing for the Cup was coming third in the 2002 FIFA World Cup. Turkey also finished third in the 2003 Confederations Cup, reached the semi-finals of Euro 2008 and played in the quarter-finals of Euro 2000. Turkey will host the UEFA Euro 2032 alongside Italy.

== Seasons ==
1900s:					1904–05	1905–06	1906–07	1907–08	1908–09	1909–10
1910s:	1910–11	1911–12	1912–13	1913–14	1914–15	1915–16	1916–17	1917–18	1918–19	1919–20
1920s:	1920–21	1921–22	1922–23	1923–24	1924–25	1925–26	1926–27	1927–28	1928–29	1929–30
1930s:	1930–31	1931–32	1932–33	1933–34	1934–35	1935–36	1936–37	1937–38	1938–39	1939–40
1940s:	1940–41	1941–42	1942–43	1943–44	1944–45	1945–46	1946–47	1947–48	1948–49	1949–50
1950s:	1950–51	1951–52	1952–53	1953–54	1954–55	1955–56	1956–57	1957–58	1958–59	1959–60
1960s:	1960–61	1961–62	1962–63	1963–64	1964–65	1965–66	1966–67	1967–68	1968–69	1969–70
1970s:	1970–71	1971–72	1972–73	1973–74	1974–75	1975–76	1976–77	1977–78	1978–79	1979–80
1980s:	1980–81	1981–82	1982–83	1983–84	1984–85	1985–86	1986–87	1987–88	1988–89	1989–90
1990s:	1990–91	1991–92	1992–93	1993–94	1994–95	1995–96	1996–97	1997–98	1998–99	1999–00
2000s:	2000–01	2001–02	2002–03	2003–04	2004–05	2005–06	2006–07	2007–08	2008–09	2009–10
2010s:	2010–11	2011–12	2012–13	2013–14	2014–15	2015–16	2016–17	2017–18	2018–19	2019–20
2020s:	2020–21	2021–22	2022–23	2023–24	2024–25	2025–26	2026–27	2027–28	2028–29	2029–30

== Attendances ==
The average attendance per top-flight football league season and the club with the highest average attendance:

Season	League average	Best club	Best club average
2024-25	11,840	Galatasaray	43,039
2023-24	11,026	Galatasaray	43,133
2022-23	12,426	Galatasaray	45,186
2021-22	—	—	—
2020-21	—	—	—
2019-20	13,930	Fenerbahçe	39,352
2018-19	14,088	Galatasaray	36,160
2017-18	12,874	Galatasaray	40,778
2016-17	10,313	Beşiktaş	30,448
2015-16	8,427	Fenerbahçe	28,589
2014-15	7,989	Galatasaray	23,812
2013-14	12,131	Fenerbahçe	34,811
2012-13	12,984	Fenerbahçe	42,585

== See also ==
- List of Turkish football champions
- List of football clubs in Turkey
- Amputee football in Turkey
- Big Three (Turkey)
- Sport in Turkey
