= List of women's football clubs in Turkey =

This is a list of women's football clubs in Turkey.

As of the 2024–25 Season:

Club	Province	1st Tier (Note: Includes seasons of Turkish Women's Football Super League; between 2006-2025.)	2nd Tier (Note: Includes seasons of Turkish Women's Second Football League; between 2008-2020 and Turkish Women's Football First League; 2022–2025 season.)	3rd Tier (Note: Includes seasons of Turkish Women's Regional Football League; between 2009-2011, Turkish Women's Third Football League; between 2014-2020 and Turkish Women's Second Football League; between 2021-2025.)	4th Tier (Note: Includes seasons of Turkish Women's Third Football League; between 2021-2025.)	Total	2024–25	Source
Konak Belediye Spor	İzmir	17	-	-	-	17	Folded	
Karadeniz Ereğli Belediye Spor	Zonguldak	16	3	-	-	19	Süper Lig	
Ataşehir Belediye Spor	İstanbul	16	2	-	-	18	1. Lig	
Adana İdmanyurduspor	Adana	15	4	-	-	19	1. Lig	
Trabzon İdmanocağı	Trabzon	10	3	-	-	13	Folded	
Beşiktaş	İstanbul	9	1	1	-	11	Süper Lig	
FOMGET GSK	Ankara	8	6	2	-	16	Süper Lig	
Kireçburnu	İstanbul	8	5	2	-	15	2. Lig	
Fatih Vatan Spor	İstanbul	8	4	4	-	16	Süper Lig	
Amed SF	Diyarbakır	8	4	2	-	14	Süper Lig	
Trabzonspor	Trabzon	8	-	-	-	8	Süper Lig	
Hakkarigücü Spor	Hakkâri	7	7	2	-	16	Süper Lig	
1207 Antalyaspor Kadın FK	Antalya	7	7	-	-	14	1. Lig	
ALG Spor	Gaziantep	7	1	2	-	10	Süper Lig	
Samsun Yabancılar Pazarı SK	Samsun	6	7	2	-	15	2. Lig	
Gazi Üniversitesispor	Ankara	6	-	-	-	6	Folded	
Mersin Camspor	Mersin	5	4	5	4	18	3. Lig	
Marmara Üniversitesi Spor	İstanbul	5	3	-	-	8	Folded	
Antalyaspor	Antalya	5	1	-	-	6	Folded	
Buca Geliştirme Spor	İzmir	5	-	-	-	5	Folded	
Lüleburgaz 39 Spor	Kırklareli	4	2	-	-	6	Folded	
Yalıspor	İstanbul	4	1	-	-	5	Folded	
Fenerbahçe	İstanbul	4	-	-	-	4	Süper Lig	
Galatasaray	İstanbul	4	-	-	-	4	Süper Lig	
Kartal SF	İstanbul	4	-	-	-	4	Folded	
Kocaeli Bayan FK	Kocaeli	3	4	1	-	8	1. Lig	
Dudullu	İstanbul	3	3	5	-	11	1. Lig	
Eskişehirspor	Eskişehir	3	3	4	2	12	2. Lig	
Derince Spor	Kocaeli	3	2	-	-	5	Folded	
Fatih Karagümrük	İstanbul	3	-	-	-	3	Folded	
Sakarya Yenikent Güneşspor	Sakarya	3	-	-	-	3	Folded	
Gazikentspor	Gaziantep	2	12	2	-	16	1. Lig	
Kayseri Kadın FK	Kayseri	2	7	4	-	13	1. Lig	
Mersin Gençlerbirliği	Mersin	2	5	7	-	14	Folded	
Karşıyaka BESEM Spor	İzmir	2	5	6	4	17	3. Lig	
Elitspor	İzmir	2	5	5	-	12	Folded	
Beylerbeyi SKSF	İstanbul	2	1	5	-	8	Süper Lig	
Çamlıcaspor	İstanbul	2	1	1	-	4	Folded	
Malatya Gençlik ve Spor	Malatya	2	1	-	-	3	Folded	
Zeytinburnuspor	İstanbul	2	1	-	-	3	Folded	
Altay	İzmir	2	-	-	-	2	Folded	
Hatayspor	Hatay	2	-	-	-	2	Folded	
Mersingücü Cengiz Topelspor	Mersin	2	-	-	-	2	Folded	
Amasya Eğitim Spor	Amasya	1	6	-	-	7	Folded	
Hatay Dumlupınarspor	Hatay	1	5	7	2	15	Folded	
Orduspor 1967	Ordu	1	2	8	-	11	Folded	
Gaziantep Asya Spor	Gaziantep	1	2	6	-	9	Folded	
Ünye Kadın SK	Ordu	1	2	4	-	7	Süper Lig	
Bursa Sağlıkgücü Gençlikspor	Bursa	1	2	1	-	4	Folded	
Gölcükspor	Kocaeli	1	2	-	-	3	Folded	
Bornova Hitab Spor	İzmir	1	1	1	1	4	Süper Lig	
İzmit Belediyespor	Kocaeli	1	1	1	-	3	Folded	
İzmit Çenesuyu Plajyoluspor	Kocaeli	1	1	-	-	2	Folded	
Çaykur Rizespor	Rize	1	-	-	-	1	Folded	
Çekmeköy BilgiDoğa Sportif SK	İstanbul	1	-	-	-	1	Süper Lig	
Dostlukspor	İstanbul	1	-	-	-	1	Folded	
Eskişehirspor Lisesi Spor	Eskişehir	1	-	-	-	1	Folded	
Sivasspor	Sivas	1	-	-	-	1	Folded	
Ovacık Gençlik ve Spor	Karabük	-	9	1	-	10	Folded	
Nusaybin SK	Mardin	-	8	1	-	9	Folded	
Küçükçekmece Akdeniz Spor	İstanbul	-	7	5	1	13	3. Lig	
Dicle Aslan Spor	Ağrı	-	6	3	-	9	Folded	
Osmaniye Kadın Spor	Osmaniye	-	6	3	-	9	2. Lig	
7 Eylül Gençlik Spor	Aydın	-	5	9	-	14	2. Lig	
Konya İdmanyurdu Spor	Konya	-	5	7	-	12	2. Lig	
Denizli Hanbat Bayan FK	Denizli	-	4	4	-	8	Folded	
Maraşgücü Spor	Kahramanmaraş	-	4	2	-	6	Folded	
Van Spor FK	Van	-	4	1	1	6	Folded	
Nazillispor	Aydın	-	3	8	2	13	2. Lig	
Çamlıca Gençlik ve Spor	Eskişehir	-	3	7	1	11	3. Lig	
Giresun Sanayispor	Giresun	-	3	7	-	10	1. Lig	
Adana Akdeniz Demir Spor	Adana	-	3	6	3	12	Folded	
Horozkent SK	Denizli	-	3	5	-	8	1. Lig	
Kızılcık Spor	Sakarya	-	3	5	-	8	Folded	
Sakarya Kadın Futbol SK	Sakarya	-	3	5	-	8	1. Lig	
Soma Zafer Spor ve Gençlik	Manisa	-	3	5	-	8	1. Lig	
Şırnak Kadın SK	Şırnak	-	3	5	-	8	1. Lig	
Bakırköy Zara	İstanbul	-	3	4	-	7	Folded	
Yıldırım Beyazıt Şafakspor	Kayseri	-	3	4	-	7	Folded	
Muş Kartal Spor	Muş	-	3	3	-	6	Folded	
Sivas Belediyesi Gazi Lisesi Spor	Sivas	-	3	2	-	5	Folded	
Gaziantep Fıstık Spor	Gaziantep	-	3	1	-	4	Folded	
Batı Ataşehir Spor	İstanbul	-	3	-	-	3	Folded	
Bursa Vatan SK	Bursa	-	3	-	-	3	Folded	
Elazığ Hedef Spor	Elazığ	-	3	-	-	3	Folded	
Mezitli Tece Limongücü Spor	Mersin	-	3	-	-	3	Folded	
Tarsus Gençlerbirliğispor	Mersin	-	2	7	4	13	3. Lig	
Hatay Defne Spor	Hatay	-	2	7	-	9	1. Lig	
Şanlıurfa Gençlik Spor	Şanlıurfa	-	2	6	4	12	3. Lig	
Malatya Bayanlar Spor	Malatya	-	2	6	3	11	Folded	
Gülizar Hasan Yılmaz GSSL Gençlik ve Spor	Samsun	-	2	5	-	7	Folded	
Telsiz Spor	İstanbul	-	2	5	-	7	1. Lig	
Aksaray Tuzgölü Spor	Aksaray	-	2	4	3	9	Folded	
Karakoçangücü Spor	Elazığ	-	2	3	-	5	Folded	
Zonguldak Gençlik Merkezispor	Zonguldak	-	2	3	-	5	Folded	
Bağcılar Evren Spor	İstanbul	-	2	2	-	4	Folded	
Başkentgücü Spor	Ankara	-	2	2	-	4	Folded	
CFS Bağcılar Spor	İstanbul	-	2	2	-	4	Folded	
Erzurum Albayraklar Spor	Erzurum	-	2	2	-	4	Folded	
Turgutlu Belediyespor	Manisa	-	2	2	-	4	Folded	
Karşıyaka Koleji Spor	Kocaeli	-	2	1	3	6	3. Lig	
Alpler Gençlik ve Spor	Denizli	-	2	1	-	3	Folded	
Kocaeli Harb-İşspor	Kocaeli	-	2	1	-	3	Folded	
Ankara 1910 Spor	Ankara	-	2	-	4	6	3. Lig	
Erbaa Güreş İhtisasspor	Tokat	-	2	-	-	2	Folded	
Karagöl Gençlikspor	Ardahan	-	2	-	-	2	Folded	
Kızıltepe Sportif Faaliyetler Spor	Mardin	-	2	-	-	2	Folded	
Orduspor	Ordu	-	2	-	-	2	Folded	
Yalova Gençlik Hizmetleri Spor	Yalova	-	2	-	-	2	Folded	
1955 Batman Belediyespor	Batman	-	1	8	1	10	2. Lig	
Adanagücü	Adana	-	1	6	4	11	3. Lig	
Muş Yağmur Spor	Muş	-	1	6	4	11	3. Lig	
Gölbaşı Belediye Spor	Ankara	-	1	6	1	8	1. Lig	
Siirt Hasbey Spor	Siirt	-	1	6	-	7	Folded	
Erzincan Gençlerbirliği Gençlik ve Spor	Erzincan	-	1	5	4	10	3. Lig	
Erbaa Gençlik Spor	Tokat	-	1	5	-	6	Folded	
Gemlik Zeytinspor	Bursa	-	1	5	-	6	Folded	
Museko SK	Tokat	-	1	5	-	6	Folded	
Yüksekova SK	Hakkâri	-	1	5	-	6	1. Lig	
Bayazıtspor	Ağrı	-	1	4	2	7	3. Lig	
Hatay Sümerspor	Hatay	-	1	4	-	5	Folded	
Güneşspor	Kayseri	-	1	3	-	4	Folded	
Nilüfer Beşevler Gençlik ve Spor	Bursa	-	1	2	1	4	3. Lig	
Trabzon İpekyolugücü SK	Trabzon	-	1	2	-	3	Folded	
Megapol SK	Gaziantep	-	1	1	2	4	1. Lig	
Çatalca Belediye Spor	İstanbul	-	1	1	1	3	Folded	
Altınşehir Lisesi Spor	İstanbul	-	1	1	-	2	Folded	
Belediye	Rize	-	1	1	-	2	Folded	
Kaynarcaspor	İstanbul	-	1	1	-	2	Folded	
Aile ve Sosyal Politikalar Gençlik ve Spor	Siirt	-	1	-	-	1	Folded	
İzmit Saraybahçe Belediyesispor	Kocaeli	-	1	-	-	1	Folded	
Kastamonuspor	Kastamonu	-	1	-	-	1	Folded	
Kızılcaköyspor	Aydın	-	1	-	-	1	Folded	
Kızıltepespor	Mardin	-	1	-	-	1	Folded	
Küplüpınar Yeşildağspor	Bursa	-	1	-	-	1	Folded	
Merkezefendispor	İstanbul	-	1	-	-	1	Folded	
Mersin Davultepe Spor	Mersin	-	1	-	-	1	Folded	
Nilüfer Gençlik ve Spor	Bursa	-	1	-	-	1	Folded	
Erzincan Gençler Gücü Spor	Erzincan	-	-	10	-	10	2. Lig	
Kılıçaslan Yıldızspor	Kayseri	-	-	10	-	10	2. Lig	
Ankara Metropol Spor	Ankara	-	-	9	1	10	3. Lig	
Kahramanmaraş Anadolu SK	Kahramanmaraş	-	-	9	-	9	2. Lig	
Antalya Baykuş Kadın SK	Antalya	-	-	8	1	9	2. Lig	
Bursa Soğanlı Spor	Bursa	-	-	8	1	9	2. Lig	
Düzce Kadın Futbol Spor	Düzce	-	-	8	1	9	2. Lig	
Bakırköy 1923 SK	İstanbul	-	-	7	4	11	3. Lig	
Rusumat-4 Gençlik ve Spor	Ordu	-	-	7	1	8	2. Lig	
76 Iğdır Spor	Iğdır	-	-	6	4	10	3. Lig	
Tekirdağ GSK	Tekirdağ	-	-	6	3	9	2. Lig	
Kastamonu Gücü Spor	Kastamonu	-	-	6	1	7	2. Lig	
Anadolu 45 SK	Manisa	-	-	5	4	9	3. Lig	
Sarıyer Belediyesi	İstanbul	-	-	5	4	9	3. Lig	
Aile ve Sosyal Politikalar Gençlik ve Spor	Ağrı	-	-	5	3	8	2. Lig	
Alibeyspor	İstanbul	-	-	5	-	5	Folded	
Çerkezköy 1923 SK	Tekirdağ	-	-	5	-	5	Folded	
Karabük Gençlikspor	Karabük	-	-	5	-	5	Folded	
Kemer FK	İstanbul	-	-	5	-	5	Folded	
Pema Koleji Gençlik ve Spor	Konya	-	-	5	-	5	Folded	
Tuzla Sahil Spor	İstanbul	-	-	5	-	5	2. Lig	
Ufuk Keleş Gençlik Spor	Tokat	-	-	5	-	5	Folded	
Rize Yeşil Çay Spor	Rize	-	-	4	4	8	3. Lig	
Trabzon Kardelen Spor	Trabzon	-	-	4	4	8	3. Lig	
Yeni Levent Konaklar Spor	İstanbul	-	-	4	4	8	3. Lig	
Mezitli Mercanlar Spor	Mersin	-	-	4	3	7	3. Lig	
Kargıcak SK	Antalya	-	-	4	2	6	Folded	
Afyon İdmanyurdu Gençlik ve Spor	Afyonkarahisar	-	-	4	1	5	3. Lig	
Anadolu Yıldızları Spor	Kayseri	-	-	4	-	4	Folded	
Batman Karşıyakaspor	Batman	-	-	4	-	4	Folded	
Denizüstü Spor	Trabzon	-	-	4	-	4	Folded	
Hatay Büyükşehir Belediyesi Gençlik Spor	Hatay	-	-	4	-	4	Folded	
Eskişehir Öncü Spor ve Gençlik	Eskişehir	-	-	3	4	7	3. Lig	
Makam Spor	Diyarbakır	-	-	3	4	7	3. Lig	
Dörtyol Belediyespor	Hatay	-	-	3	3	6	3. Lig	
Genç Ülküm SK	Konya	-	-	3	2	5	2. Lig	
Muş Alpaslan Spor	Muş	-	-	3	2	5	Folded	
Düzce Gençlik Hizmetleri Spor	Düzce	-	-	3	-	3	Folded	
Harb-İşspor	Balıkesir	-	-	3	-	3	Folded	
Isparta 32 Emre Spor	Isparta	-	-	3	-	3	Folded	
İncirliova Belediye SK	Aydın	-	-	3	-	3	Folded	
Karadeniz Ereğli Genç Yıldız Spor	Zonguldak	-	-	3	-	3	Folded	
Kayseri Atletik Spor	Kayseri	-	-	3	-	3	Folded	
Manisa Gençlerbirliği Spor	Manisa	-	-	3	-	3	Folded	
Sapanbağları İdmanyurdu Spor	İstanbul	-	-	3	-	3	Folded	
Van Yolspor	Van	-	-	3	-	3	Folded	
Yeni Kemer Belediye Spor	Antalya	-	-	3	-	3	Folded	
Ağaköyspor	Bursa	-	-	2	4	6	3. Lig	
Denizli Kaplanlar Spor	Denizli	-	-	2	4	6	3. Lig	
Mengü Spor	Ankara	-	-	2	4	6	3. Lig	
Rüzgarlıbahçe İdman Yurdu Spor	İstanbul	-	-	2	4	6	3. Lig	
1939 Güney Yıldızı Spor	Hatay	-	-	2	3	5	3. Lig	
Şehzadeler 8 Eylül Spor	Manisa	-	-	2	3	5	Folded	
Trabzon 1923 SK	Trabzon	-	-	2	3	5	3. Lig	
Bakırköy Yenimahalle FK	İstanbul	-	-	2	2	4	2. Lig	
Çanakkale Dardanel SK	Çanakkale	-	-	2	2	4	2. Lig	
Karabük Gençlerbirliği Spor	Karabük	-	-	2	2	4	2. Lig	
Kayseri Gençlerbirliği SK	Kayseri	-	-	2	2	4	3. Lig	
Pendik Güven Spor	İstanbul	-	-	2	2	4	2. Lig	
Uşak 64 Belediye Gençlik Spor	Uşak	-	-	2	2	4	2. Lig	
Vangücü SK	Van	-	-	2	2	4	2. Lig	
Denizli Sultanlar Spor	Denizli	-	-	2	1	3	2. Lig	
Gençlerbirliği	Ankara	-	-	2	1	3	2. Lig	
Sancaktepe Belediye SK	İstanbul	-	-	2	1	3	2. Lig	
Silopi Belediyesi SFSK	Şırnak	-	-	2	1	3	2. Lig	
Yakacık Genç Erlerbirliği Spor	Ankara	-	-	2	1	3	2. Lig	
1453 Maltepe Gençlik Spor	İstanbul	-	-	2	-	2	Folded	
Ada Şeker SK	Sakarya	-	-	2	-	2	Folded	
Adıyamangücü Spor	Adıyaman	-	-	2	-	2	Folded	
Balıkesir Büyükşehir Belediyespor	Balıkesir	-	-	2	-	2	Folded	
Bozüyük Halk Eğitim Gençlik ve Spor	Bilecik	-	-	2	-	2	Folded	
Diyarbekir Spor	Diyarbakır	-	-	2	-	2	Folded	
Duroğlu 1977 SK	Giresun	-	-	2	-	2	Folded	
Elazığ Sanayi Site Spor	Elazığ	-	-	2	-	2	Folded	
Eruh Sağlık Spor	Siirt	-	-	2	-	2	Folded	
Fethiyespor	Muğla	-	-	2	-	2	Folded	
İstanbul Defne Spor	İstanbul	-	-	2	-	2	Folded	
Kahramankazangücü SK	Ankara	-	-	2	-	2	Folded	
Karaman Yunuskent Spor	Karaman	-	-	2	-	2	Folded	
Keçiören Belediyesi Bağlum Spor	Ankara	-	-	2	-	2	Folded	
Sinop Kız Teknik ve Meslek Lisesi Spor	Sinop	-	-	2	-	2	Folded	
Sinop Özel İdarespor	Sinop	-	-	2	-	2	Folded	
Yeni Burdur Spor	Burdur	-	-	2	-	2	Folded	
Alanya Demirspor	Antalya	-	-	1	4	5	3. Lig	
Cudi Gençlik ve Spor	Şırnak	-	-	1	4	5	3. Lig	
Çimen Spor	Bursa	-	-	1	4	5	3. Lig	
Esenyurt Kartal Spor	İstanbul	-	-	1	4	5	3. Lig	
Bağcılar SK	İstanbul	-	-	1	1	2	2. Lig	
Gaziantep Alfa SK	Gaziantep	-	-	1	2	3	3. Lig	
Haymana SK	Ankara	-	-	1	1	2	2. Lig	
Karadeniz Ereğli Lisesi SK	Zonguldak	-	-	1	1	2	2. Lig	
Kırklar Yıldızı Gençlik ve Spor	Kırklareli	-	-	1	1	2	Folded	
Uludağ Spor	Bursa	-	-	1	1	2	2. Lig	
Üsküdar Anadolu	İstanbul	-	-	1	1	2	2. Lig	
Ağasar Çepni Spor	Trabzon	-	-	1	-	1	Folded	
Ağrı Spor Lisesi Spor	Ağrı	-	-	1	-	1	Folded	
Akçakoyunlu İdmanyurdu Spor	Kahramanmaraş	-	-	1	-	1	Folded	
Akpınarspor	Bilecik	-	-	1	-	1	Folded	
Ardeşenspor	Rize	-	-	1	-	1	Folded	
Ayvacık Belediye Spor	Samsun	-	-	1	-	1	Folded	
Başkent Kartalları SK	Ankara	-	-	1	-	1	Folded	
Bozüyük İdmanyurdu Spor	Bilecik	-	-	1	-	1	Folded	
Denizli Pamukkale Üniversitesi Gençlikspor	Denizli	-	-	1	-	1	Folded	
Didim Belediyespor	Aydın	-	-	1	-	1	Folded	
Dumlupınar	Ordu	-	-	1	-	1	Folded	
Ergani Anadolu İmam Hatip Lisesi	Diyarbakır	-	-	1	-	1	Folded	
Erzurum Spor Lisesi Spor	Erzurum	-	-	1	-	1	Folded	
Galata Sağlık Sanat Spor	Yozgat	-	-	1	-	1	Folded	
Güzeltepe Doğu Gençlik ve Spor	İzmir	-	-	1	-	1	Folded	
Jetgiller Gençlik ve Spor	Muğla	-	-	1	-	1	Folded	
Maltepe Kültür Spor	İstanbul	-	-	1	-	1	Folded	
Selçuk Belevi Gençlerbirliği Spor	İzmir	-	-	1	-	1	Folded	
Sinop Kuzey Spor	Sinop	-	-	1	-	1	Folded	
Sinopspor	Sinop	-	-	1	-	1	Folded	
Yeşilyurt	İzmir	-	-	1	-	1	Folded	
Aile ve Sosyal Politikalar Gençlik ve Spor	İstanbul	-	-	-	4	4	3. Lig	
Aile ve Sosyal Politikalar Gençlik ve Spor	Sivas	-	-	-	4	4	3. Lig	
Bitlis Kadın Futbol SK	Bitlis	-	-	-	4	4	3. Lig	
Boyabat Eğitim Spor	Sinop	-	-	-	4	4	3. Lig	
Güneykent SK	Batman	-	-	-	4	4	3. Lig	
İki Nisan Şengençler SK	Van	-	-	-	4	4	3. Lig	
Selçuk Çamlık Spor	İzmir	-	-	-	4	4	3. Lig	
Ümit Karan Gençlik ve Spor	Antalya	-	-	-	4	4	3. Lig	
Van Büyükşehir Belediyesi Gençlik ve Spor	Van	-	-	-	4	4	3. Lig	
Yozgat Yurdum Gençlik ve Spor	Yozgat	-	-	-	4	4	3. Lig	
52 Yalıköy SK	Ordu	-	-	-	3	3	Folded	
1922 Dumlupınar Spor	Kütahya	-	-	-	3	3	3. Lig	
Afyonkarahisar Anadolu Gücü Spor	Afyonkarahisar	-	-	-	3	3	3. Lig	
Arap Çeşmespor	Kocaeli	-	-	-	3	3	3. Lig	
Ardahan Kura Gençlik ve Spor	Ardahan	-	-	-	3	3	3. Lig	
Beş Ocak Demirspor	Adana	-	-	-	3	3	3. Lig	
Bornova Genç Yıldızlar Spor	İzmir	-	-	-	3	3	3. Lig	
Büyükçekmece Karadeniz İdmanocağı Spor	İstanbul	-	-	-	3	3	3. Lig	
Çanakkale Gençlik ve Spor İl Müdürlüğü SK	Çanakkale	-	-	-	3	3	Folded	
Çubuk Gençlikspor	Ankara	-	-	-	3	3	3. Lig	
Eskişehir Büyükşehir Gençlik ve Spor	Eskişehir	-	-	-	3	3	3. Lig	
Galata Spor	Mersin	-	-	-	3	3	3. Lig	
Kadirli Savrunspor	Osmaniye	-	-	-	3	3	3. Lig	
Karaağaç Arda Spor	Edirne	-	-	-	3	3	3. Lig	
Kavaklı Spor	Mersin	-	-	-	3	3	3. Lig	
Kemerspor	Bartın	-	-	-	3	3	3. Lig	
Kilis Öncüpınar SK	Kilis	-	-	-	3	3	3. Lig	
Körfez Gençlerbirliği Spor	Kocaeli	-	-	-	3	3	3. Lig	
Merinos Demiryolu SK	Bursa	-	-	-	3	3	3. Lig	
Salihli Gençlerbirliği SK	Manisa	-	-	-	3	3	3. Lig	
Silvan SK	Diyarbakır	-	-	-	3	3	3. Lig	
Viranşehir Gençliği Kültür ve SK	Şanlıurfa	-	-	-	3	3	3. Lig	
1936 Hakkari Hayalkent SK	Hakkâri	-	-	-	2	2	3. Lig	
Acıyaman SK	Adıyaman	-	-	-	2	2	3. Lig	
Adana Dostlar SK	Adana	-	-	-	2	2	3. Lig	
Altıpas Spor	Zonguldak	-	-	-	2	2	3. Lig	
Avcılar Cihangirspor	İstanbul	-	-	-	2	2	3. Lig	
Bandırmagücü SK	Balıkesir	-	-	-	2	2	3. Lig	
Batman Mezopotamya Spor	Batman	-	-	-	2	2	3. Lig	
Bayrampaşa Yenidoğan Spor	İstanbul	-	-	-	2	2	3. Lig	
Bilecikspor	Bilecik	-	-	-	2	2	Folded	
Bulanık Bilican Spor	Muş	-	-	-	2	2	3. Lig	
Burdur Gençlik ve Spor	Burdur	-	-	-	2	2	3. Lig	
Bursa Kadın SK	Bursa	-	-	-	2	2	Folded	
Bursa Ufuk Spor	Bursa	-	-	-	2	2	3. Lig	
Büyük Yoncalıspor	Tekirdağ	-	-	-	2	2	3. Lig	
Cizre 2020 GSK	Şırnak	-	-	-	2	2	Folded	
Diyarbakır Büyükşehir Belediye Spor	Diyarbakır	-	-	-	2	2	3. Lig	
Eski İzmir Gençlik ve Spor	İzmir	-	-	-	2	2	3. Lig	
Gaziantep İdmanyurdu SK	Gaziantep	-	-	-	2	2	3. Lig	
Gaziantep Özçalışkan SK	Gaziantep	-	-	-	2	2	3. Lig	
İstanbul Mesudiyespor	İstanbul	-	-	-	2	2	3. Lig	
Karabağlar FK	İzmir	-	-	-	2	2	Folded	
Karabağlar SK	İzmir	-	-	-	2	2	3. Lig	
Karamürsel Belediye SK	Kocaeli	-	-	-	2	2	3. Lig	
Kırıkkale Metropol Spor	Kırıkkale	-	-	-	2	2	3. Lig	
Kocaeli Gölcük İdmanocağı Kadın Futbol Spor	Kocaeli	-	-	-	2	2	3. Lig	
Küçükköyspor	İstanbul	-	-	-	2	2	3. Lig	
Muğla Atletik Spor	Muğla	-	-	-	2	2	Folded	
Nişantepe Futbol SK	İstanbul	-	-	-	2	2	3. Lig	
Ordu Gücü FK	Ordu	-	-	-	2	2	3. Lig	
Ordu Pars SK	Ordu	-	-	-	2	2	3. Lig	
Polatlıspor	Ankara	-	-	-	2	2	3. Lig	
Sarıyer Maden Gençlik Spor	İstanbul	-	-	-	2	2	Folded	
Söke Latmos Sayrakçı Gençlik ve Spor	Aydın	-	-	-	2	2	Folded	
Tunç Spor	İstanbul	-	-	-	2	2	3. Lig	
Yalovaspor	Yalova	-	-	-	2	2	Folded	
1967 Erciş Spor	Van	-	-	-	1	1	3. Lig	
Adalar	İstanbul	-	-	-	1	1	3. Lig	
Ahıskaspor	Bursa	-	-	-	1	1	3. Lig	
ALG Tekstil FKSK	Gaziantep	-	-	-	1	1	3. Lig	
Amasis SK	Amasya	-	-	-	1	1	3. Lig	
Anka 2023 SK	Balıkesir	-	-	-	1	1	3. Lig	
Arif Nihat Asya SK	Gaziantep	-	-	-	1	1	3. Lig	
Aydın İncirliova Spor Lisesi SK	Aydın	-	-	-	1	1	3. Lig	
Bağcılar 1992 SK	İstanbul	-	-	-	1	1	3. Lig	
Beypars SK	Ankara	-	-	-	1	1	3. Lig	
Bigaspor	Çanakkale	-	-	-	1	1	3. Lig	
Bilecik Kolej Kız SK	Bilecik	-	-	-	1	1	3. Lig	
Bodrum FK	Muğla	-	-	-	1	1	Folded	
Bolu Gençlik ve Spor İl Müdürlüğü SK	Bolu	-	-	-	1	1	3. Lig	
Bolu Karaçayır SK	Bolu	-	-	-	1	1	3. Lig	
Canlı Spor	İzmir	-	-	-	1	1	3. Lig	
Cizre Spor Lisesi SK	Şırnak	-	-	-	1	1	3. Lig	
Çamlıca 1977 SK	Gaziantep	-	-	-	1	1	3. Lig	
Çanakkale Arslancaspor	Çanakkale	-	-	-	1	1	3. Lig	
Çıkrıkçı Gençlik Spor	Manisa	-	-	-	1	1	3. Lig	
Çorum Buhara SK	Çorum	-	-	-	1	1	3. Lig	
Dallıcaspor	Aydın	-	-	-	1	1	3. Lig	
Darıca Birlik Spor	Kocaeli	-	-	-	1	1	3. Lig	
Diyarbakır Yurdum SK	Diyarbakır	-	-	-	1	1	3. Lig	
Düzce İdmanyurdu Gençlik ve Spor	Düzce	-	-	-	1	1	3. Lig	
Ege Yıldızları Gençlik ve Spor	Muğla	-	-	-	1	1	Folded	
Elmadağ Gücü SK	Ankara	-	-	-	1	1	Folded	
Esentepe Spor	Eskişehir	-	-	-	1	1	Folded	
Eyüp Çırçır İmarspor	İstanbul	-	-	-	1	1	3. Lig	
Fatsa Anadolu Spor	Ordu	-	-	-	1	1	3. Lig	
Gazipaşa Kartalları SK	Antalya	-	-	-	1	1	3. Lig	
Genç Yiğitler SK	Ankara	-	-	-	1	1	3. Lig	
Hadırlıgücü SK	Adana	-	-	-	1	1	Folded	
Iğdır Altınova Spor	Iğdır	-	-	-	1	1	Folded	
Isparta Davraz Gençlik ve Spor	Isparta	-	-	-	1	1	3. Lig	
İdil Demir SK	Şırnak	-	-	-	1	1	3. Lig	
İmranlıspor	Sivas	-	-	-	1	1	3. Lig	
İnegöl Turgutalp SK	Bursa	-	-	-	1	1	3. Lig	
İpekyolu Belediyesi Gençlik ve Spor	Van	-	-	-	1	1	Folded	
İskenderun 6 Şubat SK	Hatay	-	-	-	1	1	3. Lig	
İstanbul Atakent Spor	İstanbul	-	-	-	1	1	3. Lig	
Kapaklı Kartal Spor	Tekirdağ	-	-	-	1	1	3. Lig	
Kartalgücü Futbol SK	Ordu	-	-	-	1	1	3. Lig	
Kırşehir Futbol SK	Kırşehir	-	-	-	1	1	3. Lig	
Kızıltepe Spor Lisesi Spor	Mardin	-	-	-	1	1	Folded	
Kocaeli Kadıngücü SK	Kocaeli	-	-	-	1	1	3. Lig	
Küçükçekmece İdmanyurdu Gençlik ve Spor	İstanbul	-	-	-	1	1	3. Lig	
Ladikspor	Samsun	-	-	-	1	1	3. Lig	
Lüleburgaz Yıldız SK	Kırklareli	-	-	-	1	1	3. Lig	
Menemen Gençlik Spor	İzmir	-	-	-	1	1	3. Lig	
Mıdık Adaspor	Adana	-	-	-	1	1	Folded	
Orhangazi Gençlerbirliği	Bursa	-	-	-	1	1	3. Lig	
Ömerli Spor	Mardin	-	-	-	1	1	Folded	
Panayırspor	Bursa	-	-	-	1	1	Folded	
Pursaklar Belediye Spor	Ankara	-	-	-	1	1	3. Lig	
Referans SK	Ankara	-	-	-	1	1	3. Lig	
Sancaktepe Yenidoğan Spor	İstanbul	-	-	-	1	1	Folded	
Selçuklu Dumlupınar SK	Konya	-	-	-	1	1	3. Lig	
Serdivan 1907 Spor	Sakarya	-	-	-	1	1	3. Lig	
Seydikemer Doğan Spor	Muğla	-	-	-	1	1	3. Lig	
Siirt Milli Egemenlik SK	Siirt	-	-	-	1	1	3. Lig	
Siirt Üniversitesi Spor	Siirt	-	-	-	1	1	Folded	
Siverek İdmanyurdu Spor	Şanlıurfa	-	-	-	1	1	3. Lig	
Şanlıder SK	Gaziantep	-	-	-	1	1	3. Lig	
Tekirdağspor	Tekirdağ	-	-	-	1	1	Folded	
Trabzon Samandıra Spor	İstanbul	-	-	-	1	1	3. Lig	
Tunceli Yeninesil SK	Tunceli	-	-	-	1	1	3. Lig	
Uşak Üniversitesi SK	Uşak	-	-	-	1	1	3. Lig	
Van İpekyolu Spor	Van	-	-	-	1	1	Folded	
Vefaspor	İstanbul	-	-	-	1	1	Folded	
Venüs SK	Ankara	-	-	-	1	1	3. Lig	
Yavuzspor	Kocaeli	-	-	-	1	1	3. Lig	

== See also ==
- List of football clubs in Turkey
- Turkish Women's First Football League
- Women's football in Turkey
