= Zeynep Mestan =

Turkish football manager and former footballer (born 2004)

Zeynep Mestan (born 30 July 2004) is a Turkish football manager, and former women's footballer.

== Football player career ==
Mestan started playing football at Karşıyaka BESEM Spor in her hometown in November 2019. For the 2021–22 Women's Third League season, she transferred to Bornova Hitab Spor. Her team finished the group stage as leader, became league champion after play-offs, and was promoted to the Women's Swcond League. In the 2023–24 season, she was with Bornova Genç Yıldızlar Spor n the Women's Third League again. She played one more season with the team, and ended her football playing career.

== Football manager career ==
After serving as an assistant coach for women's and men's football teams, the 22-year old former footballer was appointed in September 2026 manager of the men's football team Turgutluspor in Manisa Province, which was recently relegated to the Manisa Super Amateur League after playing in the TFF 2. Lig and TFF 3. Lig.

== Personal life ==
Zeynep Mestan was born in Bornova, İzmir, western Turkey on 30 July 2004.

She studied in the Faculty of Sport Science at Ege University in İzmir.
