= Ceren Nurlu =

Turkish women's football forward (born 1992)

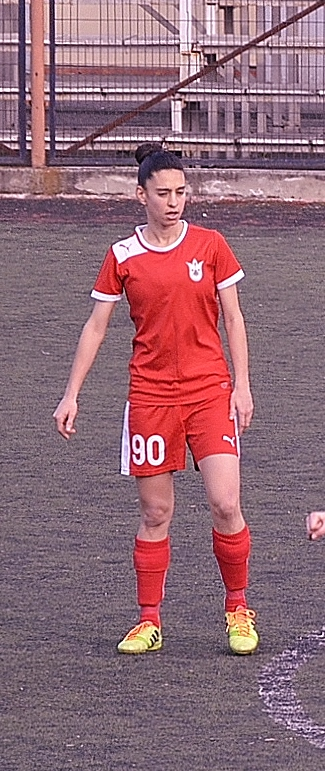
- Ceren Nurlu for Konak Belediyespor (2013–14 season)

Personal information
- Full name: Ceren Nurlu
- Date of birth: 12 January 1992 (age 34)
- Place of birth: Iskenderun, Turkey
- Position: Forward

Team information
- Current team: Çatalca Belediye Spor
- Number: 7

Youth career
- 2005–2008: Hatay Sanayispor

Senior career*
Years	Team	Apps	(Gls)
2008–2010	Hatay Dumlupınarspor	9	(2)
2010–2017	Konak Belediyespor	93	(48)
2018	Beşiktaş J.K.	9	(0)
2018–	Kdz. Ereğli Belediye Spor	16	(5)
2018–2020	Fatih Vatan Spor	11	(4)
2020–2022	Tuzla Sahil Spor	7	(9)
2022–2023	Bornova Hitab Spor	23	(77)
2023–2024	Çatalca Belediye Spor	15	(6)

International career^{‡}
2007	Turkey U-17	3	(1)
2009–2010	Turkey U-19	24	(3)
2011–2016	Turkey	5	(0)
- * Club domestic league appearances and goals as of 7 April 2024 ‡ National team caps and goals as of 8 April 2016

Ceren Nurlu (born 12 January 1992) is a Turkish women's footballer who plays as a forward in the Turkish Women's Football Firstl League for Çatalca Belediye Spor. She made her Champions League debut in August 2013 with her current club. She played in the Turkey women's U-17 and U-19 national teams before joining the Turkish women's national team.

== Early life ==
Nurlu was born in Iskenderun on 12 January 1992. Her father was Mutasim Okkan Nurlu.

== Club career ==
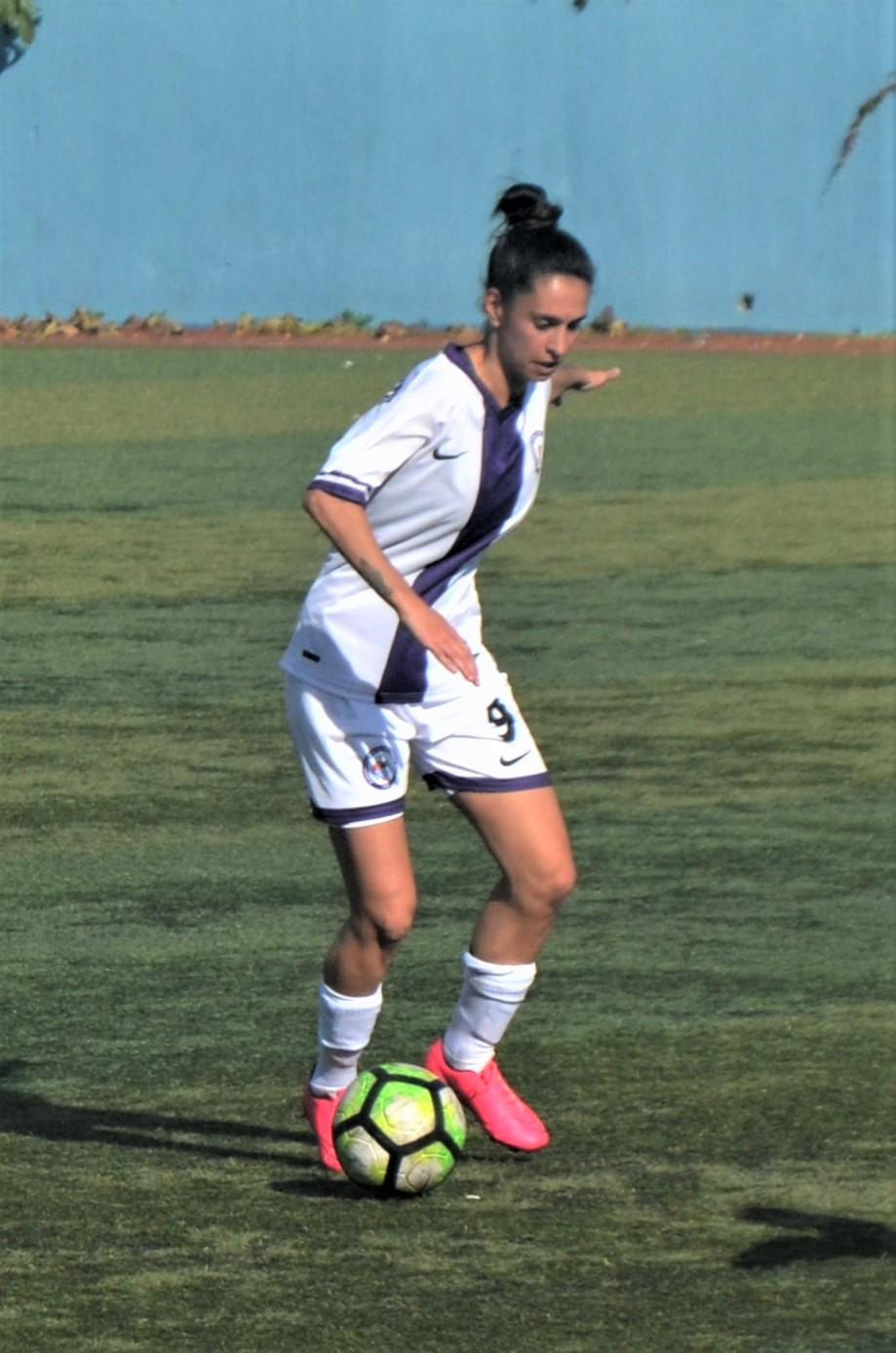
Ceren Nurlu of Kdz. Ereğlispor in the 2018–19 Women's First League season

Nurlu began her football career at Hatay Sanayispor, a club in her hometown Hatay Province, after she obtained her license on 6 October 2005. She took part in the youth team until she transferred to Hatay Dumlupınarspor on 26 December 2008. After one season, Nurlu signed for Konak Belediyespor in İzmir on 8 October 2010.

Nurlu debuted in the 2013–14 UEFA Women's Champions League Group 1 match against FC NSA Sofia on 8 August 2013, after she enjoyed her team's champion title at the end of the 2012–13 Women's First League season. Nurlu played in three matches of the 2015–16 UEFA Women's Champions League qualifying round, and scored one goal.

At the end of the 2015–16 season, she enjoyed her team's champion title. She played in three matches of the Group 9 of the 2016–17 UEFA Women's Champions League qualifying round.

Nurlu transferred to Beşiktaş J.K. in the second half of the 2017–18 League season.

In October 2018, she joined Kdz. ereğlispor to play in the 2018-19 Women's First League.

The next season, Nurlu transferred to the Istanbul-based club Fatih Vatan Spor. She played eleven matches in the 2019-20 Women's First League.

After eleven matches in the 2019-20 Women's First League season, she moved to Tuzla Sahil Sporto play in the Women's Third League in February 2020. The Women's Second and Third League were not held in the 2020-21 season due to COVID-19 pandemic in Turkey. Tuzla Sahil Spor was promoted to the Women's Second League in the 2021-22 season, where Nurlu played four matches.

In the 2021-22 Women's Third League season, she played four matches for Tuzla Spor.

For the remaining matches of the 2021-22 season, she joined the newly-established club Bornova Hitab Spor in İzmir to play in the 2021-22 Women's Third League. She helped her team finish the season undefeated, won the play-offs and get promoted to the Women's Second League. Nurlu became top goalscorer of the league season with 56.

In the 2023-24 season, she mobed to Istanbul, and played for the Women's First League team Çatalca Belediye Spor.

== International career ==
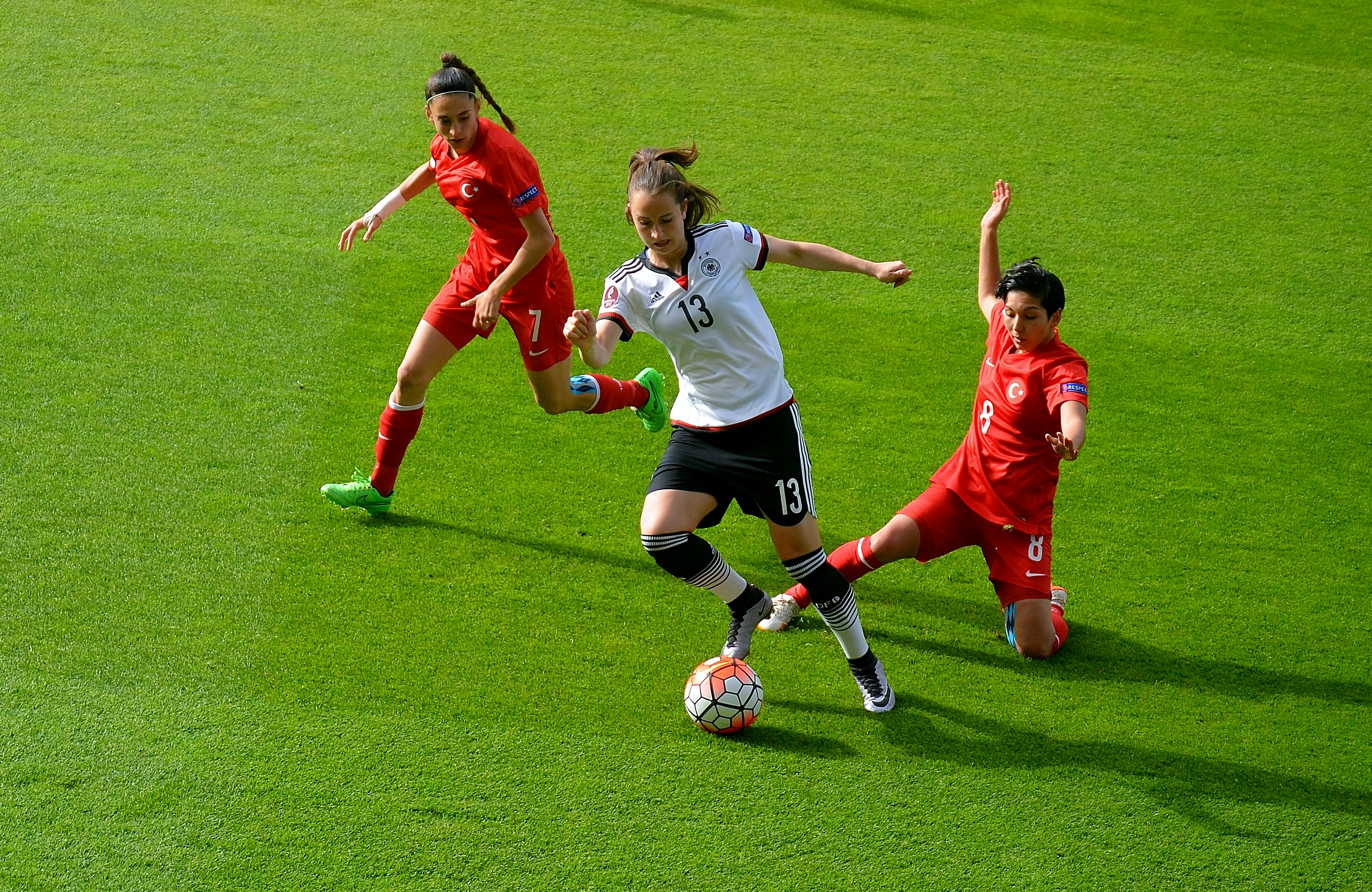
Ceren Nurlu (left) playing for Turkey national against Germany at the UEFA Women's Euro 2017 qualifying Group 5 match.

Nurlu made her debut in the Turkey women's national U-17 team at the friendly match against Macedonia on 10 October 2007, and scored her first international goal, her team's the only in that game. She participated in the 2008 UEFA Women's U-17 Championship qualification round Group 6 matches. Nurlu capped 5 times in the national U-17 team.

She was called up to the Turkey women's national U-19 team and played for her first game in the Kuban Spring Tournament match against Ukraine on 14 March 2009. She appeared in the 2010 UEFA Women's U-19 Championship First qualifying round Group 7 and 2011 UEFA Women's U-19 Championship First qualifying round Group 9 matches. She capped 24 times in total in the national U-19 team and scored one goal in the friendly match against the Belarusian team on 17 April 2009.

On 23 August 2011, Nurlu played for the first time in the Turkish women's national team at the friendly match against Portuguese women. Nurlu took part in the 2015 FIFA Women's World Cup qualification – UEFA Group 6 matches.

== Career statistics ==
As of match played 7 April 2024.

Club	Season	League			Continental		National		Total	
Club	Season	Division	Apps	Goals	Apps	Goals	Apps	Goals	Apps	Goals
Hatay Sanayi	2007–08	Second League			–	-	3	1	3	1
Hatay Sanayi	Total				–	–	3	1	3	1
Hatay Dumlupınar	2008–09	Second League	7	2	–	-	8	3	15	5
Hatay Dumlupınar	2009–10	Second League	2	0	–	-	14	0	16	0
Hatay Dumlupınar	Total		9	2	–	–	22	3	31	5
Konak Bld.	2010–11	First League	15	7	–	-	3	0	18	7
Konak Bld.	2011–12	First League	17	8	–	-	1	0	18	8
Konak Bld.	2012–13	First League	11	5	–	-	0	0	11	5
Konak Bld.	2013–14	First League	16	8	5	0	3	0	24	8
Konak Bld.	2015–16	First League	18	17	3	1	1	0	22	18
Konak Bld.	2016–17	First League	16	3	3	1	0	0	19	4
Konak Bld.	Total		93	48	11	2	7	0	111	50
Beşiktaş	2017–18	First League	9	0	–	–	0	0	9	0
Kdz. Ereğli Bld.	2018–19	First League	16	5	–	–	0	0	16	5
Fatih Vatan	2019–20	First League	11	4	–	–	0	0	11	4
Tuzla Sahil	2019–20	Third League Gr. 2	3	9	–	-	0	0	3	9
Tuzla Sahil	2021–22	Secınd League Gr. D	4	0	-	-	0	0	4	0
Tuzla Sahil	Total		7	9	-	-	0	0	7	9
Bornova Hitab	2021-22	Third League Gr. E	11	67	-	-	0	0	11	67
Bornova Hitab	2022-23	Second League Gr. B	12	10	-	-	0	0	12	10
Bornova Hitab	Total		23	77	-	-	0	0	23	77
Çatalca Bld.	2023-24	First League Gr. B	15	6	-	-	0	0	15	6
Career total			183	151	11	2	32	4	226	159

== Honours ==
=== Club ===
Turkish Women's First League

Konak Belediyespor
Winners (5): 2012–13, 2013–14, 2014–15, 2015–16, 2016–17
Runners-up 1): 2010–11

Beşiktaş J.K.
Runners-up (1): 2017–18

Turkish Women's Second league

Bornova Hitab Spor
Winners (1): 2022–23

Turkish Women's Third league

Bornova Hitab Spor
Winners (1): 2021–22

=== Individual ===
Top goalscorer (1)
Turkish Women's Third League

Bornova Hitab Spor (56 goals)
