= 2024–25 in Turkish football =

2024–25 Turkish football season

Football in Turkey
- Season: 2024–25

Men's football
- Süper Lig: Galatasaray
- First League: Kocaelispor
- Turkish Cup: Galatasaray
- Turkish Super Cup: Beşiktaş

Women's football
- Women's Super League: ABB Fomget

The 2024–25 season was the 120th season of competitive football in Turkey.

== Pre-season ==
League	Promoted to league	Relegated from league
Süper Lig	Eyüpspor; Göztepe; Bodrum	Ankaragücü; Fatih Karagümrük; Pendikspor; İstanbulspor
1. Lig	Esenler Erokspor; Amed; Iğdır	Tuzlaspor; Giresunspor; Altay
2. Lig	Adana 1954; Batman Petrolspor; Elazığspor; Erbaaspor; Karaköprü Belediyespor; Kepezspor	Adıyaman; Uşakspor; Bursaspor; Kırşehir; Denizlispor; Düzcespor; Zonguldak Kömürspor; Etimesgut Belediyespor
3. Lig	Beykoz İshaklı; Çorluspor 1947; Nilüfer Belediye; Tire 2021; Muğlaspor; 1926 Polatlı Belediyespor; Niğde Belediyesispor; Viranşehir Belediyespor; Mazıdağı Fosfatspor; Çayelispor; Yozgat Belediyesi Bozokspor; Türk Metal 1963	Akhisarspor; Çatalcaspor; Darıca Gençlerbirliği; Eynesil Belediyespor; Gümüşhanespor; Hacettepe 1945; Malatya Arguvan; Sapanca Gençlikspor; Siirt İl Özel İdaresi; Sivas Dört Eylülspor; Sultanbeyli Belediyespor; Tarsus İdman Yurdu

== Men's ==
=== League tables ===
==== Süper Lig ====
Pos	Team	Pld	W	D	L	GF	GA	GD	Pts	Qualification or relegation
1	Galatasaray (C)	36	30	5	1	91	31	+60	95	Qualification for the Champions League league phase
2	Fenerbahçe	36	26	6	4	90	39	+51	84	Qualification for the Champions League third qualifying round
3	Samsunspor	36	19	7	10	55	41	+14	64	Qualification for the Europa League play-off round (Note: The 2024–25 Turkish Cup winners qualified for the Europa League play-off round. Since the cup winners (Galatasaray) qualified based on league position, the Europa League play-off round spot was passed to the third-placed team, the Europa League second round spot was passed to the fourth-placed team, and the Conference League spot was passed to the fifth-placed team.)
4	Beşiktaş	36	17	11	8	59	36	+23	62	Qualification for the Europa League second qualifying round
5	Başakşehir	36	16	6	14	60	56	+4	54	Qualification for the Conference League second qualifying round
6	Eyüpspor	36	15	8	13	52	47	+5	53	
7	Trabzonspor	36	13	12	11	58	45	+13	51	
8	Göztepe	36	13	11	12	59	50	+9	50	
9	Rizespor	36	15	4	17	52	58	−6	49	
10	Kasımpaşa	36	11	14	11	62	63	−1	47	
11	Konyaspor	36	13	7	16	45	50	−5	46	
12	Gaziantep	36	12	9	15	45	50	−5	45	
13	Alanyaspor	36	12	9	15	43	50	−7	45	
14	Kayserispor	36	11	12	13	45	57	−12	45	
15	Antalyaspor	36	12	8	16	37	62	−25	44	
16	Bodrum (R)	36	9	10	17	26	43	−17	37	Relegation to 2025–26 TFF First League
17	Sivasspor (R)	36	9	8	19	44	60	−16	35	Relegation to 2025–26 TFF First League
18	Hatayspor (R)	36	6	8	22	47	74	−27	26	Relegation to 2025–26 TFF First League
19	Adana Demirspor (R)	36	3	5	28	34	92	−58	2 (Note: Adana Demirspor had 12 points deducted.)	Relegation to 2025–26 TFF First League

Source: Süper Lig
Rules for classification: 1) Points; 2) Head-to-head points; 3) Head-to-head goal difference; 4) Head-to-head goals scored; 5) Goal difference; 6) Goals scored; 7) Play-off.
(Note: Head-to-head record is used only after all the matches between the teams in question have been played)
(C) Champions; (R) Relegated

==== 1. Lig ====
Pos	Team	Pld	W	D	L	GF	GA	GD	Pts	Promotion, qualification or relegation
1	Kocaelispor (C, P)	38	21	9	8	68	41	+27	72	Promotion to the Süper Lig
2	Gençlerbirliği (P)	38	19	11	8	57	34	+23	68	Promotion to the Süper Lig
3	Fatih Karagümrük (O, P)	38	19	9	10	55	36	+19	66	Qualification for the Süper Lig play-off final
4	İstanbulspor	38	20	4	14	67	38	+29	64 (Note: Head-to-head points: İstanbulspor 7, Bandırmaspor 7, Erzurumspor 3. Head-to-head goal difference: İstanbulspor +1, Bandırmaspor 0.)	Qualification for the Süper Lig play-off quarter-finals
5	Bandırmaspor	38	17	13	8	52	45	+7	64	Qualification for the Süper Lig play-off quarter-finals
6	Erzurumspor	38	19	7	12	53	31	+22	64	Qualification for the Süper Lig play-off quarter-finals
7	Boluspor	38	17	10	11	66	40	+26	61	Qualification for the Süper Lig play-off quarter-finals
8	Iğdır	38	16	10	12	57	33	+24	58	
9	Amedspor	38	14	15	9	43	35	+8	57	
10	Çorum	38	14	12	12	49	45	+4	54	
11	Ümraniyespor	38	14	11	13	48	42	+6	53	
12	Esenler Erokspor	38	13	13	12	53	50	+3	52	
13	Sakaryaspor	38	13	12	13	48	54	−6	51 (Note: Head-to-head points: Sakaryaspor 4, Keçiörengücü 1.)	
14	Keçiörengücü	38	14	9	15	60	53	+7	51	
15	Manisa	38	14	6	18	50	52	−2	48 (Note: Head-to-head points: Manisa 9, Pendikspor 7, Ankaragücü 1.)	
16	Pendikspor	38	13	9	16	45	51	−6	48	
17	Ankaragücü (R)	38	14	6	18	49	48	+1	48	Relegation to the TFF Second League
18	Şanlıurfaspor (R)	38	11	7	20	45	55	−10	40	Relegation to the TFF Second League
19	Adanaspor (R)	38	7	9	22	32	75	−43	30	Relegation to the TFF Second League
20	Yeni Malatyaspor (Note: Yeni Malatyaspor were deducted 3 points after forfeiting a match to Pendikspor.) (R)	38	0	0	38	14	153	−139	−21	Relegation to the TFF Second League

Source: TFF
Rules for classification: 1) Points; 2) Head-to-head points; 3) Head-to-head goal difference; 4) Head-to-head goals scored; 5) Goal difference; 6) Goals scored; 7) Play-off.
(Note: Head-to-head record is used only after all the matches between the teams in question have been played)
(C) Champions; (O) Play-off winners; (P) Promoted; (R) Relegated

== Women's ==
=== Women's Super League ===
Pos	Team	Pld	W	D	L	GF	GA	GD	Pts	Qualification or relegation
1	ABB Fomget	26	23	1	2	100	19	+81	70	Qual. for the 2025–26 UEFA WCL 1st rd
2	Fenerbahçe	26	22	2	2	85	11	+74	68	
3	Beşiktaş	26	17	2	7	48	27	+21	53	
4	Galatasaray	26	15	5	6	73	33	+40	50	
5	Trabzonspor	26	15	3	8	64	23	+41	48	
6	Beylerbeyi	26	14	5	7	57	23	+34	47	
7	ALG	26	13	6	7	51	35	+16	45	
8	Fatih Vatan	26	11	3	12	44	30	+14	36	
9	Hakkarigücü	26	8	8	10	35	32	+3	32	
10	Ünye Kadın	26	6	5	15	47	58	−11	23	
11	Amed	26	6	5	15	32	53	−21	23	
12	Bornova Hitab (Note: 3 points deducted by the decision of the Federation)	26	5	5	16	32	66	−34	17	
13	Çekmeköy BilgiDoğa (Note: 3 points deducted by the decision of the Federation)	26	2	0	24	12	192	−180	3	
14	Kdz. Ereğli Bld. (Note: 3 points deducted by the decision of the Federation)	26	0	0	26	0	78	−78	−3	Relegation to the First League

Source: TFF.org

== Cup competitions ==
=== Turkish Cup ===
==== Final ====
14 May 2025
20:45 TRT

Trabzonspor	0–3	Galatasaray
	Report	Yılmaz 5'; Osimhen 46', 63'

Gaziantep Stadium, Gaziantep
Referee: Cihan Aydın

=== Turkish Super Cup ===
3 August 2024
20:45 TRT (UTC+3)

Galatasaray	0–5	Beşiktaş
	Report	Immobile 1', 81' (pen.); Svensson 53'; Silva 90+1'; Hekimoğlu 90+2'

Atatürk Olympic Stadium, Istanbul
Attendance: 70,847
Referee: Atilla Karaoğlan

== National team ==
=== Friendlies ===
7 June 2025 Friendly	United States	1–2	Turkey	East Hartford, Connecticut
15:30 EDT (UTC−04:00)	McGlynn 1'		Güler 24'; Aktürkoğlu 27'	Stadium: Pratt & Whitney Stadium; Attendance: 34,023; Referee: Fernando Morón (Panama)

10 June 2025 Friendly	Mexico	1–0	Turkey	Chapel Hill, United States
20:30 EDT (UTC−04:00)	Pineda 45'	Report		Stadium: Kenan Stadium; Referee: Moeth Gaymes (Saint Vincent and the Grenadines)

=== 2024–25 UEFA Nations League ===
Pos	Team	Pld	W	D	L	GF	GA	GD	Pts	Promotion, qualification or relegation	(Wales)	(Turkey)	(Iceland)	(Montenegro)
1	Wales (P)	6	3	3	0	9	4	+5	12	Promotion to League A	—	0–0	4–1	1–0
2	Turkey (O, P)	6	3	2	1	9	6	+3	11	Qualification for promotion play-offs	0–0	—	3–1	1–0
3	Iceland (R)	6	2	1	3	10	13	−3	7	Qualification for relegation play-offs	2–2	2–4	—	2–0
4	Montenegro (R)	6	1	0	5	4	9	−5	3	Relegation to League C	1–2	3–1	0–2	—

Source: UEFA
Rules for classification: Tiebreakers
(O) Play-off winners; (P) Promoted; (R) Relegated

6 September 2024 2024–25 UEFA Nations League B	Wales	0–0	Turkey	Cardiff, Wales
18:45 UTC+0		Report		Stadium: Cardiff City Stadium; Attendance: 28,625; Referee: Rohit Saggi (Norway)

9 September 2024 2024–25 UEFA Nations League B	Turkey	3–1	Iceland	İzmir, Turkey
21:45 UTC+3	Aktürkoğlu 2', 52', 88'	Report	Pálsson 37'	Stadium: Gürsel Aksel Stadium; Attendance: 16,167; Referee: Enea Jorgji (Albania)

11 October 2024 2024–25 UEFA Nations League B	Turkey	1–0	Montenegro	Samsun, Turkey
21:45 UTC+3	Kahveci 69'	Report		Stadium: Samsun 19 Mayıs Stadium; Attendance: 28,829; Referee: Daniele Chiffi (Italy)

14 October 2024 2024–25 UEFA Nations League B	Iceland	2–4	Turkey	Reykjavík, Iceland
18:45 UTC+0	Óskarsson 3'; A. Guðjohnsen 83'	Report	Kahveci 62'; Çalhanoğlu 67' (pen.); Güler 88'; Aktürkoğlu 90+5'	Stadium: Laugardalsvöllur; Attendance: 5,260; Referee: Damian Sylwestrzak (Poland)

16 November 2024 2024–25 UEFA Nations League B	Turkey	0–0	Wales	Kayseri, Turkey
20:00 UTC+3		Report		Stadium: Kadir Has Stadium; Attendance: 28,812; Referee: Juan Martínez Munuera (Spain)

19 November 2024 2024–25 UEFA Nations League B	Montenegro	3–1	Turkey	Podgorica, Montenegro
20:45 UTC+1	Krstović 29', 45', 73'	Report	Yıldız 37'	Stadium: Podgorica City Stadium; Attendance: 2,579; Referee: Urs Schnyder (Switzerland)

20 March 2025 2024–25 UEFA Nations League promotion/relegation play-offs	Turkey	3–1	Hungary	Istanbul, Turkey
20:00 TRT (UTC+03:00)	Kökçü 9'; Aktürkoğlu 69'; Kahveci 73'	Report	Schäfer 25'	Stadium: Ali Sami Yen Spor Kompleksi; Attendance: 38,500; Referee: Ivan Kružliak (Slovakia)

23 March 2025 2024–25 UEFA Nations League promotion/relegation play-offs	Hungary	0–3 (1–6 agg.)	Turkey	Budapest, Hungary
18:00 CET (UTC+01:00)		Report	Çalhanoğlu 37' (pen.); Güler 39'; Bardakcı 90'	Stadium: Puskás Aréna; Attendance: 57,861; Referee: Felix Zwayer (Germany)

== Turkish clubs in Europe ==
=== UEFA Champions League ===
==== Second qualifying round ====
Team 1	Agg.	Team 2	1st leg	2nd leg
Lugano (Switzerland)	4–6	(Turkey) Fenerbahçe	3–4	2–1

==== Third qualifying round ====
Team 1	Agg.	Team 2	1st leg	2nd leg
Lille (France)	3–2	(Turkey) Fenerbahçe	2–1	1–1 (a.e.t.)

==== Play-off round ====
Team 1	Agg.	Team 2	1st leg	2nd leg
Young Boys (Switzerland)	4–2	(Turkey) Galatasaray	3–2	1–0

=== UEFA Europa League ===
==== Second qualifying round ====
Team 1	Agg.	Team 2	1st leg	2nd leg
Ružomberok (Slovakia)	0–3	(Turkey) Trabzonspor	0–2	0–1

==== Third qualifying round ====
Team 1	Agg.	Team 2	1st leg	2nd leg
Trabzonspor (Turkey)	0–3	(Austria) Rapid Wien	0–1	0–2

==== Play-off round ====
Team 1	Agg.	Team 2	1st leg	2nd leg
Lugano (Switzerland)	4–8	(Turkey) Beşiktaş	3–3	1–5

==== League phase ====
===== Galatasaray =====
Pos	Team	Pld	W	D	L	GF	GA	GD	Pts	Qualification
12	(Royal Dutch Football Association) Ajax	8	4	1	3	16	8	+8	13	Advance to knockout phase play-offs (seeded)
13	(Royal Spanish Football Federation) Real Sociedad	8	4	1	3	13	9	+4	13	Advance to knockout phase play-offs (seeded)
14	(Turkish Football Federation) Galatasaray	8	3	4	1	19	16	+3	13	Advance to knockout phase play-offs (seeded)
15	(Italian Football Federation) Roma	8	3	3	2	10	6	+4	12	Advance to knockout phase play-offs (seeded)
16	(Football Association of the Czech Republic) Viktoria Plzeň	8	3	3	2	13	12	+1	12	Advance to knockout phase play-offs (seeded)

Source: UEFA
Rules for classification: League phase tiebreakers

Home team	Score	Away team
Galatasaray (Turkey)	3–1	(Greece) PAOK
RFS (Latvia)	2–2	(Turkey) Galatasaray
Galatasaray (Turkey)	4–3	(Sweden) IF Elfsborg
Galatasaray (Turkey)	3–2	(England) Tottenham Hotspur
AZ (Netherlands)	1–1	(Turkey) Galatasaray
Malmö FF (Sweden)	2–2	(Turkey) Galatasaray
Galatasaray (Turkey)	3–3	(Ukraine) Dynamo Kyiv
Ajax (Netherlands)	2–1	(Turkey) Galatasaray

===== Fenerbahçe =====
Pos	Team	Pld	W	D	L	GF	GA	GD	Pts	Qualification
22	(Hellenic Football Federation) PAOK	8	3	1	4	12	10	+2	10	Advance to knockout phase play-offs (unseeded)
23	(Royal Dutch Football Association) Twente	8	2	4	2	8	9	−1	10	Advance to knockout phase play-offs (unseeded)
24	(Turkish Football Federation) Fenerbahçe	8	2	4	2	9	11	−2	10	Advance to knockout phase play-offs (unseeded)
25	(Portuguese Football Federation) Braga	8	3	1	4	9	12	−3	10	
26	(Swedish Football Association) IF Elfsborg	8	3	1	4	9	14	−5	10	

Source: UEFA
Rules for classification: League phase tiebreakers

Home team	Score	Away team
Fenerbahçe (Turkey)	2–1	(Belgium) Union Saint-Gilloise
Twente (Netherlands)	1–1	(Turkey) Fenerbahçe
Fenerbahçe (Turkey)	1–1	(England) Manchester United
AZ (Netherlands)	3–1	(Turkey) Fenerbahçe
Slavia Prague (Czech Republic)	1–2	(Turkey) Fenerbahçe
Fenerbahçe (Turkey)	0–2	(Spain) Athletic Bilbao
Fenerbahçe (Turkey)	0–0	(France) Lyon
Midtjylland (Denmark)	2–2	(Turkey) Fenerbahçe

===== Beşiktaş =====
Pos	Team	Pld	W	D	L	GF	GA	GD	Pts
26	(Swedish Football Association) IF Elfsborg	8	3	1	4	9	14	−5	10
27	(German Football Association) TSG Hoffenheim	8	2	3	3	11	14	−3	9
28	(Turkish Football Federation) Beşiktaş	8	3	0	5	10	15	−5	9
29	(Israel Football Association) Maccabi Tel Aviv	8	2	0	6	8	17	−9	6
30	(Football Association of the Czech Republic) Slavia Prague	8	1	2	5	7	11	−4	5

Source: UEFA
Rules for classification: League phase tiebreakers

Home team	Score	Away team
Ajax (Netherlands)	4–0	(Turkey) Beşiktaş
Beşiktaş (Turkey)	1–3	(Germany) Eintracht Frankfurt
Lyon (France)	0–1	(Turkey) Beşiktaş
Beşiktaş (Turkey)	2–1	(Sweden) Malmö FF
Beşiktaş (Turkey)	1–3	(Israel) Maccabi Tel Aviv
Bodø/Glimt (Norway)	2–1	(Turkey) Beşiktaş
Beşiktaş (Turkey)	4–1	(Spain) Athletic Bilbao
Twente (Netherlands)	1–0	(Turkey) Beşiktaş

==== Knockout phase ====
===== Knockout phase play-offs =====
Team 1	Agg.	Team 2	1st leg	2nd leg
AZ (Netherlands)	6–3	(Turkey) Galatasaray	4–1	2–2
Fenerbahçe (Turkey)	5–2	(Belgium) Anderlecht	3–0	2–2

===== Round of 16 =====
Team 1	Agg.	Team 2	1st leg	2nd leg
Fenerbahçe (Turkey)	3–3 (2–3 p)	(Scotland) Rangers	1–3	2–0 (a.e.t.)

=== UEFA Conference League ===
==== Second qualifying round ====
Team 1	Agg.	Team 2	1st leg	2nd leg
İstanbul Başakşehir (Turkey)	10–1	(San Marino) La Fiorita	6–1	4–0

==== Third qualifying round ====
Team 1	Agg.	Team 2	1st leg	2nd leg
Iberia 1999 (Georgia (country))	0–3	(Turkey) İstanbul Başakşehir	0–1	0–2

==== Play-off round ====
Team 1	Agg.	Team 2	1st leg	2nd leg
St. Gallen (Switzerland)	1–1 (5–4 p)	(Turkey) Trabzonspor	0–0	1–1 (a.e.t.)
St Patrick's Athletic (Republic of Ireland)	0–2	(Turkey) İstanbul Başakşehir	0–0	0–2

==== League phase ====
===== İstanbul Başakşehir =====
Pos	Team	Pld	W	D	L	GF	GA	GD	Pts	Qualification
24	(Football Association of Serbia) TSC	6	2	1	3	10	13	−3	7	Advance to knockout phase play-offs (unseeded)
25	(Scottish Football Association) Heart of Midlothian	6	2	1	3	6	9	−3	7	
26	(Turkish Football Federation) İstanbul Başakşehir	6	1	3	2	9	12	−3	6	
27	(Football Association of the Czech Republic) Mladá Boleslav	6	2	0	4	7	10	−3	6	
28	(Kazakhstan Football Federation) Astana	6	1	2	3	4	8	−4	5	

Source: UEFA
Rules for classification: League phase tiebreakers

Home team	Score	Away team
İstanbul Başakşehir (Turkey)	1–2	(Austria) Rapid Wien
Celje (Slovenia)	5–1	(Turkey) İstanbul Başakşehir
Copenhagen (Denmark)	2–2	(Turkey) İstanbul Başakşehir
İstanbul Başakşehir (Turkey)	1–1	(Moldova) Petrocub Hîncești
İstanbul Başakşehir (Turkey)	3–1	(Germany) 1. FC Heidenheim
Cercle Brugge (Belgium)	1–1	(Turkey) İstanbul Başakşehir
