= Hatay Sümerspor =

- Full name: Hatay Sümerspor Bayan Futbol Takımı
- Founded: 2013
- Dissolved: 2018
- Ground: Nazım Koka Football Fİeld
- Chairman: Zeki Bayırlı
- League: Turkish Women's Third Football League

Hatay Sümerspor Women's Football (Turkish: Hatay Sümerspor Bayan Futbol Takımı) was a women's football team based at Defne district in Hatay Province, southern Turkey last playing in the Turkish Women's Third Football League. It was formed in 2013 as part of the 1975-established Hatay Sümerspor Football Club. The club's chairman is Zeki Bayırlı. The team were active five seasons long until 2018. Hatay Sümerspor Women's played home matches at Nazım Koka Football Field in Hatay.

== History ==
The women's football team of the sports club Hatay Sümerspor were formed in 2013, and were admitted in 2013–14 season to the Women's Second League, which was the lowest level women's league at that time. With the establishment of the Women's Third League in the 2014–15 season, the team were relegated to the lower-level league. They played at the end of the 2017–18 season in the Women's Third League until the umbrella club decided the closure of the women's football department.

== Statistics ==
Season	League	Pos	Pld	W	D	L	GF	GA	GD	Pts
2013–14	Women's Second League – Gr. 5	5	16	8	0	8	90	41	-49	24
2014–15	Women's Third League– Gr. 6	3	12	8	2	2	80	21	+59	26
2015–16	Women's Third League – Gr. 6	4	18	9	1	8	78	50	+28	28
2016–17	Women's Third League – Gr. 7	4	24	17	1	6	100	33	+67	52
2017–18	Women's Third League – Gr. 10	3	10	6	0	4	42	18	+24	18
Green marks a season followed by promotion, red a season followed by relegation.
