= 1904–05 in Turkish football =

The 1904–05 season was the first season of organized football in Turkey.

The Istanbul Football League featured only four clubs at the time: Moda FC, HMS Imogene FC, Elpis FC, and Cadi-Keuy FC. The 1904 champion of league football in Turkey was Imogene, a team made up of Englishmen. Cadi-Keuy FC became the champion in 1905.

The first league of Turkey lasted for 55 years until it was replaced with the Turkish First Football League (now Süper Lig).
