= Turgutluspor =

Turkish sports club

- Full name: Turgutluspor
- Nickname: Kasaba (The Town)
- Founded: 1984; 42 years ago
- Ground: 7 Eylül Stadium, Turgutlu
- Capacity: 4,100
- Chairman: Murat Ayhan
- Manager: Zeynep Mestan
- League: TFF 3. Lig
- 2021–22: TFF 2. Lig, Red, 17th (relegated)
- Website: http://turgutluspor.org.tr/
| Home colours | Away colours |

Turgutluspor is a Turkish sports club located in Turgutlu, Manisa Province. The football club currently plays in the TFF Third League.
