= Dörtyol Belediyespor =

- Full name: Dörtyol Belediyespor
- League: Turkish Women's Third Football League

Dörtyol Belediyespor is a women's football club located in Dörtyol near Hatay, southern Turkey. The team competes in Turkish Women's Third Football League.

== Statistics ==
Season	League	Pos	Pld	W	D	L	GF	GA	GD	Pts
2015–16	Women's Third League – Gr. 6	7	18	5	0	13	34	103	69 -	15
2016–17	Women's Third League – Gr. 7	1	24	22	12	0	134	7	+127	68
2018–19	Women's Third League – Gr. 10	5	8	0	0	8	0	24	-24	-3^{1})
Green marks a season followed by promotion, red a season followed by relegation.

Notes:

- ^{1}) Three penalty points were deducted by the Turkish Football Federation
