= Brigitte Omboudou =

Cameroonian footballer (born 1992)

Personal information
- Date of birth: 29 July 1992 (age 34)
- Place of birth: Nkol Tsogo 2, Obala, Cameroon
- Height: 1.65 m (5 ft 5 in)
- Position: Midfielder

Team information
- Current team: Neom
- Number: 17

Senior career*
Years	Team	Apps	(Gls)
2016–2018	Louves Minproff		
2016–2017	→ Minsk (loan)	1	(0)
2018	Delta Queens	?	(5)
2019–2021	Amazone FAP		
2021–2022	Rivers Angels		
2022–2024	FC Ebolowa Filles		
2024	Hakkarigücü	8	(0)
2024–2025	Bornova Hitab	10	(0)
2025	Al-Amal		
2025–	Neom		

International career^{‡}
2015–	Cameroon	2+	(0)
- * Club domestic league appearances and goals as of 22 December 2024 ‡ National team caps and goals as of 12 November 2019

Brigitte Omboudou (born 29 July 1992) is a Cameroonian women's football midfielder who plays in the Saudi Women's Premier League for Neom and the Cameroon women's national team.

== Club career ==
Omboudou has played in her country for Louves Minproff. Outside Cameroon, she has made appearances for Belarusian Premier League club FC Minsk and Nigerian Women Premier League club Delta Queens FC.

In February 2024, Omboudou moved to Turkey, and signed with Hakkarigücü to play in the second half of the 2023–24 Super League. The next season, she transferred to the newly to the Super League promoted club Bornova Hitab in İzmir. After the first half of the 2024–25 Super League season, she left Turkey on 10 January 2025 for Saudi Arabia.

== International career ==
Omboudou played for Cameroon at senior level in the 2015 African Games and the 2020 CAF Women's Olympic Qualifying Tournament (fourth round).<re name="ff1"f/>
