= Natasha Shirazi =

Ugandan footballer (born 1996)

Natasha Shirazi نتاشا شیرازی
Personal information
- Date of birth: 8 February 1996 (age 30)
- Place of birth: Uganda
- Position: Forward

Team information
- Current team: Odysseas Moschatou WFC

Senior career*
Years	Team	Apps	(Gls)
2017	BSF	13	(1)
2017–2019	B.93	15	(3)
2019	Nordsjælland	3	(1)
2019–2020	Rayo Vallecano	1	(0)
2020–2021	La Solana	1	(0)
2021	B.93	2	(0)
2021–2022	Maccabi Kishronot Hadera	19	(5)
2022–2023	Beşiktaş	4	(0)
2023	Venezia		
2023	Shelbourne	1	(0)
2023–2024	KF Tirana		
2024	REA	12	(3)
2024–2025	Rodez AF		
2025	Bornova Hitab Spor	9	(0)
2025–	Odysseas Moschatou		

International career
2016–	Uganda	1	(0)
- * Club domestic league appearances and goals as of 7 July 2025

Natasha Shirazi (Persian: نتاشا شیرازی; born 8 February 1996) is a Ugandan footballer who plays as a forward for the Uganda national team and Odysseas Moschatou in Greece.

== Personal life ==
Shirazi also holds Danish citizenship.

== Club career ==
Shirazi has played for BSF, B.93, and Nordsjælland in Denmark, for Rayo Vallecano and La Solana in Spain and for Maccabi Kishronot Hadera in Israel.

In August 2022, she moved to Turkey and joined Beşiktaş in Istanbul to play in the 2022–23 Super League season. In January 2025, she returned to Turkey after playing for REA in Greece and for Rodez AF in France. She signed with the İzmir-based club Bornova Hitab for the second half of the 2024–25 Super League season.

== International career ==
Shirazi played for Uganda at senior level on 3 July 2016 in a 0–4 friendly away loss to Kenya.
