= 1959–60 in Turkish football =

55th season of competitive football in Turkey

Football in Turkey
- Season: 1959-60

Men's football
- Süper Lig: Beşiktaş

The 1959–60 season was the 55th season of competitive football in Turkey.

== Overview ==
Beşiktaş were crowned champions for the first time. The club recorded eleven wins by a 1–0 result. Fenerbahçe finished second, while Galatasaray placed third. Baraj Maçları (Baraj Matches) were created to decide who would be relegated and promoted. The bottom three teams from the Milli Lig faced off against the winning teams from the Adana, Ankara, Istanbul, and İzmir leagues. Altınordu were the only club to stay in the Milli Lig, while Hacettepe and Adalet were relegated to the Ankara and Istanbul leagues respectively.

In Europe, Fenerbahçe took part in the 1959–60 European Cup. They were knocked out by OGC Nice in the first round after losing out in the play-off match. Beşiktaş qualified for the 1960–61 European Cup after winning the 1959–60 Milli Lig.

== Honours ==
Competition	Winner	Runners-up
Milli Lig	Beşiktaş (1)	Fenerbahçe (1)
Adana Professional League	Mersin İdmanyurdu (5)	
Ankara Professional League	PTT (1)	
Eskişehir Regional League	Eskişehir Şekerspor (2)	
Istanbul Professional League	Eyüpspor (1)	
İzmir Professional League	İzmir Demirspor (1)	
Kayseri Regional League	Havagücü (1)	
Trabzon Regional League	Idmanocağı (13)	

Notes – Number in parentheses is the times that club has won that honour.

== Awards ==
- Gol Kralı (Goal King)
  - Metin Oktay (Galatasaray) – 33 goals

== Final league table ==
Pos	Team	Pld	W	D	L	GF	GA	±	Pts	Notes
1	Beşiktaş	38	29	7	2	68	15	+53	65	European Cup
2	Fenerbahçe	38	27	6	5	88	38	+50	60	
3	Galatasaray	38	24	10	4	74	23	+51	58	
4	İzmirspor	38	17	13	8	62	44	+18	47	
5	Ankara Demirspor	38	17	11	10	49	40	+9	45	
6	İstanbulspor	38	13	16	9	38	35	+3	42	
7	Feriköy	38	18	4	16	44	39	+5	40	
8	Karagümrük	38	15	10	13	50	45	+5	40	
9	Karşıyaka	38	14	8	16	43	52	-9	36	
10	Gençlerbirliği	38	12	11	15	50	46	+4	35	
11	Vefa	38	11	13	14	37	60	-23	35	
12	Şeker Hilal	38	12	10	16	37	43	-6	34	
13	Kasımpaşa	38	9	15	14	31	48	-17	33	
14	Göztepe	38	9	14	15	34	41	-7	32	
15	Ankaragücü	38	9	12	17	39	56	-17	30	
16	Beykoz	38	8	14	16	35	56	-21	30	
17	Altay	38	10	8	20	45	64	-19	28	
18	Adalet	38	9	8	21	26	48	-22	26	Qualified for Baraj Maçları
19	Hacettepe	38	8	8	22	42	68	-24	24	Qualified for Baraj Maçları
20	Altınordu	38	6	8	24	38	69	-31	20	Qualified for Baraj Maçları

== Baraj Maçları ==
Pos	Team	Pld	W	D	L	GF	GA	±	Pts	Notes
1	Altınordu	6	3	2	1	9	3	+6	8	Remain in the Milli Lig
2	Adana Demirspor	6	4	0	2	13	8	+5	8	Promoted to the Milli Lig
3	PTT	6	4	0	2	13	8	+5	8	Promoted to the Milli Lig
4	Hacettepe	6	3	1	2	10	9	+1	7	Relegated to Ankara Professional League
5	Adalet	6	2	1	3	7	8	-1	5	Relegated to Istanbul Professional League
6	Eyüpspor	6	1	2	3	4	13	-9	4	Relegated to Istanbul Professional League
7	İzmir Demirspor	6	0	2	4	2	9	-7	3	Relegated to İzmir Professional League

== Clubs in Europe ==
Fenerbahçe qualified for the 1959–60 European Cup after winning the 1959 Milli Lig. The club took part in the preliminary round, beating Hungarian side Csepel SC 4–3 on aggregate. The club progressed to the first round, where they met French club OGC Nice. Both clubs drew 3–3 on aggregate. An extra play-off match was needed to decide who would advance. Fenerbahçe went on to lose the play-off match 1–5.

Preliminary round

13 September 1959	Fenerbahçe (Turkey)	1–1	(Hungary) Csepel	Mithatpaşa Stadium, Istanbul
	Can 73'		Kisuczky 1'	Attendance: 26,432; Referee: Leo Lemesić (Yugoslavia)

23 September 1959	Csepel (Hungary)	2–3	(Turkey) Fenerbahçe	Népstadion, Budapest
	Ughy 10'; Németh 34'		Lefter 22'; Şeref 47'; Avni 53'	Attendance: 45,000; Referee: Zivko Bajić (Yugoslavia)

First round

19 November 1959	Fenerbahçe (Turkey)	2–1	(France) Nice	Mithatpaşa Stadium, Istanbul
	Can 37'; Şeref 80'		Milazzo 40'	Attendance: 29,656; Referee: Václav Korelus (Czechoslovakia)

3 December 1959	Nice (France)	2–1	(Turkey) Fenerbahçe	Stade Municipal du Ray, Nice
	Foix 62'; Faivre 76'		Lefter 83'	Attendance: 15,824; Referee: Martin Macko (Czechoslovakia)

Play-off

23 December 1959	Nice (France)	5–1	(Turkey) Fenerbahçe	Stade des Charmilles, Genève
	Foix 7' 63'; Milazzo 17'; Faivre 31' de Bourgoing 59'		Şeref 47'	Attendance: 9,166; Referee: Paul Wyssling (Switzerland)

== National team ==
The Turkey national football team took part in a single friendly during the 1959–60. They defeated Scotland 4–2, with Lefter Küçükandonyadis netting two goals.

8 June 1960	Turkey	4–2	Scotland	Ankara
	Metin 9'; Lefter 33', 35'; Şenol 61'		Caldow 13' (pen.); Young 71'
