= 2010–11 in Turkish football =

Football in Turkey
- Season: 2010–11

Men's football
- Süper Lig: Fenerbahçe
- First League: Mersin İdman Yurdu
- Turkish Cup: Beşiktaş
- Turkish Super Cup: Trabzonspor

The 2010–11 season was the 106th season of competitive football in Turkey.

== League tables ==
=== Süper Lig ===
Pos	Team	Pld	W	D	L	GF	GA	GD	Pts	Qualification or relegation
1	Fenerbahçe (C)	34	26	4	4	84	34	+50	82	
2	Trabzonspor	34	25	7	2	69	23	+46	82	Qualification to Champions League group stage (Note: Originally, Fenerbahçe qualified for the group stage and Trabzonspor qualified for the third qualifying round. Despite being eliminated in the third qualifying round and passed to the UEFA Europa League play-off round, Trabzonspor replaced Fenerbahçe after the Turkish Football Federation withdrew Fenerbahçe from the UEFA Champions League one day before the group stage draw due to match-fixing allegations. UEFA would then select Trabzonspor as their replacement.)
3	Bursaspor	34	17	10	7	50	29	+21	61	Qualification to Europa League third qualifying round
4	Gaziantepspor	34	17	8	9	44	33	+11	59	Qualification to Europa League second qualifying round
5	Beşiktaş	34	15	9	10	53	36	+17	54	Qualification to Europa League play-off round (Note: Beşiktaş have won the 2010–11 Turkish Cup competition and thus are qualified for the play-off round of the UEFA Europa League.)
6	Kayserispor	34	14	9	11	46	44	+2	51	
7	Eskişehirspor	34	12	11	11	41	40	+1	47	
8	Galatasaray	34	14	4	16	41	46	−5	46	
9	Kardemir Karabükspor	34	12	8	14	46	53	−7	44	
10	Manisaspor	34	13	4	17	49	52	−3	43	
11	Antalyaspor	34	10	12	12	41	48	−7	42 (Note: Antalyaspor were ahead of Sivasspor on head-to-head record: Antalyaspor–İstanbul B.B. 1–0, İstanbul B.B.–Antalyaspor 1–1.)	
12	İstanbul B.B.	34	12	6	16	40	45	−5	42	
13	MKE Ankaragücü	34	10	11	13	52	62	−10	41	
14	Gençlerbirliği	34	10	10	14	43	51	−8	40	
15	Sivasspor	34	8	11	15	43	57	−14	35	
16	Bucaspor (R)	34	6	8	20	37	65	−28	26	Relegation to 2011–12 TFF First League
17	Konyaspor (R)	34	4	12	18	28	49	−21	24	Relegation to 2011–12 TFF First League
18	Kasımpaşa (R)	34	5	8	21	31	71	−40	23	Relegation to 2011–12 TFF First League

Source: tff.org (in Turkish)
Rules for classification: 1) points; 2) goal difference; 3) number of goals scored.
(C) Champions; (R) Relegated

=== 1.Lig ===
Pos	Team	Pld	W	D	L	GF	GA	GD	Pts	Qualification or relegation
1	Mersin İdmanyurdu (C, P)	32	17	7	8	39	29	+10	58	Promotion to Süper Lig
2	Samsunspor (P)	32	16	10	6	45	20	+25	58	Promotion to Süper Lig
3	Gaziantep B.B.	32	16	9	7	43	26	+17	57	Qualification for Promotion Playoffs
4	Çaykur Rizespor	32	15	9	8	36	24	+12	54	Qualification for Promotion Playoffs
5	Orduspor (O, P)	32	14	12	6	47	29	+18	54	Qualification for Promotion Playoffs
6	TKİ Tavşanlı Linyitspor	32	13	12	7	32	28	+4	51	Qualification for Promotion Playoffs
7	Boluspor	32	14	7	11	46	31	+15	49	
8	Kayseri Erciyesspor	32	11	15	6	40	29	+11	48	
9	Denizlispor	32	11	11	10	40	31	+9	44	
10	Karşıyaka	32	10	11	11	26	34	−8	41	
11	Giresunspor	32	11	5	16	27	32	−5	38	
12	Adanaspor	32	8	13	11	41	42	−1	37	
13	Kartalspor	32	7	13	12	21	29	−8	34	
14	Akhisar Belediyespor	32	8	9	15	27	39	−12	33	
15	Güngörenspor	32	7	12	13	19	42	−23	33	
16	Altay (R)	32	7	10	15	27	43	−16	31	Relegation to TFF Second League
17	Diyarbakırspor (R)	32	1	7	24	10	59	−49	10	Relegation to TFF Second League

Source: TFF First League page
Rules for classification: 1) points; 2) goal difference; 3) number of goals scored.
(C) Champions; (O) Play-off winners; (P) Promoted; (R) Relegated

== Turkish Cup ==
- Teams seeded for the group stages: Trabzonspor (defending champions), Bursaspor (1st in the Süper Lig), Fenerbahçe (2nd), and Galatasaray (3rd).
- Teams seeded for the play-off round: Beşiktaş (4th in the Süper Lig), İstanbul B.B. (6th), Eskişehirspor (7th), Kayserispor (8th), Antalyaspor (9th), Gençlerbirliği (10th), Kasımpaşa (11th), Ankaragücü (12th), Gaziantepspor (13th), Manisaspor (14th), Sivasspor (15th), Karabükspor (1.Lig champions), Bucaspor (1.Lig runners-up), and Konyaspor (promoted from the 1.Lig)
- Teams seeded for the second round: Diyarbakırspor (16th in the Süper Lig), Denizlispor (17th), Adanaspor (3rd in the 1.Lig), Altay (4th), Karşıyaka (5th), Giresunspor (7th), Orduspor (8th), Boluspor (9th), Samsunspor (10th), Kayseri Erciyesspor (11th), Gaziantep B.B. (12th), Mersin İdmanyurdu (13th), Kartalspor (14th), Çaykur Rizespor (15th)

== National team ==
=== Friendlies ===
11 August 2010	Turkey	2 – 0	Romania	Istanbul, Turkey
	Belözoğlu 82' (pen.); Turan 86'	Report		Stadium: Şükrü Saracoğlu Stadium; Referee: Milorad Maziç (Serbia)

17 November 2010	Netherlands	1 – 0	Turkey	Amsterdam, Netherlands
	Huntelaar 52'			Stadium: Amsterdam ArenA; Attendance: 38,500; Referee: Viktor Kassai (Hungary)

9 February 2011	Turkey	0 – 0	South Korea	Trabzon, Turkey
				Stadium: Hüseyin Avni Aker Stadium; Attendance: 12,000; Referee: Serhiy Boyko (Ukraine)

=== Euro 2012 qualification ===
Pos	Team	Pld	W	D	L	GF	GA	GD	Pts	Qualification	(Germany)	(Turkey)	(Belgium)	(Austria)	(Azerbaijan)	(Kazakhstan)
1	Germany	10	10	0	0	34	7	+27	30	Qualify for final tournament	—	3–0	3–1	6–2	6–1	4–0
2	Turkey	10	5	2	3	13	11	+2	17	Advance to play-offs	1–3	—	3–2	2–0	1–0	2–1
3	Belgium	10	4	3	3	21	15	+6	15		0–1	1–1	—	4–4	4–1	4–1
4	Austria	10	3	3	4	16	17	−1	12		1–2	0–0	0–2	—	3–0	2–0
5	Azerbaijan	10	2	1	7	10	26	−16	7		1–3	1–0	1–1	1–4	—	3–2
6	Kazakhstan	10	1	1	8	6	24	−18	4		0–3	0–3	0–2	0–0	2–1	—

Source: UEFA
Rules for classification: Qualification tiebreakers

3 September 2010	Kazakhstan	0 – 3	Turkey	Astana, Kazakhstan
22:00 UTC+6		Report	Turan 24'; Altıntop 26'; Kahveci 76'	Stadium: Astana Arena; Attendance: 25,000; Referee: István Vad (Hungary)

7 September 2010	Turkey	3 – 2	Belgium	Istanbul, Turkey
21:00 UTC+3	Altıntop 48'; Şentürk 67'; Turan 78'	Report	Van Buyten 28', 69'	Stadium: Şükrü Saracoğlu Stadium; Attendance: 41,000; Referee: Damir Skomina (Slovenia)

8 October 2010	Germany	3 – 0	Turkey	Berlin, Germany
20:45 UTC+2	Klose 42', 87'; Özil 79'	Report		Stadium: Olympiastadion; Attendance: 74,244; Referee: Howard Webb (England)

12 October 2010	Azerbaijan	1 – 0	Turkey	Baku, Azerbaijan
20:00 UTC+5	Sadygov 38'	Report		Stadium: Tofiq Bahramov Republican Stadium; Attendance: 29,500; Referee: Alexandru Deaconu (Romania)

29 March 2011	Turkey	2 – 0	Austria	Istanbul, Turkey
20:30 UTC+3	Turan 28'; Gönül 78'	Report		Stadium: Şükrü Saracoğlu Stadium; Attendance: 40,420; Referee: Pavel Královec (Czech Republic)

3 June 2011	Belgium	1 – 1	Turkey	Brussels, Belgium
20:45 UTC+2	Ogunjimi 4'	Report	Yılmaz 22'	Stadium: King Baudouin Stadium; Attendance: 44,185; Referee: Nicola Rizzoli (Italy)
