= 1962–63 in Turkish football =

Turkish football season

The 1962–63 season was the 59th season of competitive football in Turkey.

== Overview ==
Galatasaray won their second title, becoming the first club to win back-to-back league titles. Beşiktaş finished runners-up, with Fenerbahçe rounding out the top three. The Turkish Cup was held for the first time at the start of the 1962–63 season. Galatasaray defeated Fenerbahçe 4–2 on aggregate.

In previous years, the league was held with two separate groups. Winners of each group would face each other in a two-legged final. However, the format was changed to a final league table, with the club with the most points crowned champions. The top six clubs from each group qualified for the final group, while the bottom two clubs in each group were relegated (Karagümrük, Şeker Hilal, Vefa, Yeşildirek).

Galatasaray competed in the 1962–63 European Cup, defeating Polish club Polonia Bytom in the first round. They went on to lose 1 – 8 on aggregate against A.C. Milan in the second round. Altay lost to A.S. Roma in the first round of the 1962–63 Inter-Cities Fairs Cup. Fenerbahçe qualified for the Balkans Cup, but the competition was cancelled.

Metin Oktay finished top scorer with 38 goals: 16 during the group stage, and 22 during the finals.

== Awards ==
- Top scorer
  - Metin Oktay (Galatasaray S.K.) - 38 goals

== Honours ==
Competition	Winner	Runners-up
Milli Lig	Galatasaray (2)	Beşiktaş (1)
Turkish Cup	Galatasaray (1)	Fenerbahçe (1)

== European qualification ==
Competition	Qualifiers	Reason for qualification
European Cup	Galatasaray	1st in Milli Lig
European Cup Winners' Cup	Fenerbahçe	Runners-up for the Turkish Cup (Qualification awarded as Türkiye Kupası winners Galatasaray had already qualified for European competition by finishing first in the league)
Balkans Cup	Beşiktaş	2nd in Milli Lig
Balkans Cup	Altay	4th in Milli Lig

== Final league table ==
Pos	Team	Pld	W	D	L	GF	GA	±	Pts	Notes
1	Galatasaray	22	14	7	1	54	14	+40	35	European Cup
2	Beşiktaş	22	14	6	2	45	12	+33	34	Balkans Cup
3	Fenerbahçe	22	10	6	6	31	19	+12	26	European Cup Winners' Cup
4	Altay	22	8	8	6	23	25	-2	24	Balkans Cup
5	İstanbulspor	22	7	9	6	29	27	+2	23	
6	Gençlerbirliği	22	5	11	6	31	29	2	21	
7	Hacettepe	22	8	4	10	34	41	-7	20	0.829
8	İzmirspor	22	7	6	9	27	38	-11	20	0.711
9	Beykoz	22	5	8	9	25	28	-3	18	0.893
10	Ankara Demirspor	22	6	6	10	34	41	-7	18	0.829
11	Karşıyaka	22	4	7	11	27	56	-29	15	
12	Kasımpaşa	22	2	6	14	17	47	-30	10	

Notes

- Tiebreakers are the average of goals scored to goals allowed.

== Türkiye Kupası final ==
First leg

1963-06-29

Galatasaray	2 – 1	Fenerbahçe
Uğur 40'; Tarik 50'	(Report)	Selim 60'

Mithatpaşa Stadyumu, Istanbul
Referee: Paul Schiller, Josef Stoll (Austria)

Second leg

1963-06-30

Fenerbahçe	1 – 2	Galatasaray
Lefter 44' (pen.)	(Report)	Bahri 51'; Mustafa 71'

Mithatpaşa Stadyumu, Istanbul
Referee: Paul Schiller, Josef Stoll (Austria)

1963 Türkiye Kupası winners
Galatasaray
First title

== National team ==
The Turkey national football team competed in six matches during the 1962–63 season. Their record was two wins, two draws, and two losses. Metin Oktay scored three goals during the season.

10 October 1962

Turkey	3–0	Ethiopia
Metin 3', 33', 73'

Ankara

25 November 1962

Israel	0–2	Turkey
		Şenol 11', 14'

Tel-Aviv

2 December 1962

Italy	6–0	Turkey
Rivera 15', 47'; Orlando 22', 29', 35', 87'

Bologna

12 December 1962

Turkey	1–1	Denmark
Birol 5'		Madsen 9'

Istanbul

16 December 1962

Ethiopia	0–0	Turkey

Adis Abeba

27 March 1963

Turkey	0–1	Italy
		Sormani 86'

Istanbul
