= 2008–09 in Turkish football =

The 2008–09 season was the 105th season of competitive football in Turkey.

== Managerial changes ==
Name	Club	Date of departure	Replacement	Date of appointment
Safet Sušić	Ankaraspor	May, 2008	Aykut Kocaman	May, 2008
Güvenç Kurtar	Denizlispor	May, 2008	Ali Yalçın	June, 2008
Nejat Biyedić	Eskişehirspor	June, 2008	Rıza Çalımbay	June, 2008
Karl Heinz Feldkamp	Galatasaray	April, 2008	Michael Skibbe	June, 2008
Zico	Fenerbahçe	June, 2008	Luis Aragonés	June, 2008

== Uefa competitions ==
=== Group G ===
Pos	Team	Pld	W	D	L	GF	GA	GD	Pts	Qualification	POR	ARS	DKV	FEN
1	(Portugal) Porto	6	4	0	2	9	8	+1	12	Advance to knockout phase	—	2–0	0–1	3–1
2	(England) Arsenal	6	3	2	1	11	5	+6	11	Advance to knockout phase	4–0	—	1–0	0–0
3	(Ukraine) Dynamo Kyiv	6	2	2	2	4	4	0	8	Transfer to UEFA Cup	1–2	1–1	—	1–0
4	(Turkey) Fenerbahçe	6	0	2	4	4	11	−7	2		1–2	2–5	0–0	—

Source: RSSSF

=== UEFA Europa League ===
==== Group B ====
Pos	Team	Pld	W	D	L	GF	GA	GD	Pts	Qualification	MET	GAL	OLY	HER	BEN
1	(Ukraine) Metalist Kharkiv	4	3	1	0	3	0	+3	10	Advance to knockout stage	—	—	1–0	0–0	—
2	(Turkey) Galatasaray	4	3	0	1	4	1	+3	9	Advance to knockout stage	0–1	—	1–0	—	—
3	(Greece) Olympiacos	4	2	0	2	9	3	+6	6	Advance to knockout stage	—	—	—	4–0	5–1
4	(Germany) Hertha BSC	4	0	2	2	1	6	−5	2		—	0–1	—	—	1–1
5	(Portugal) Benfica	4	0	1	3	2	9	−7	1		0–1	0–2	—	—	—

Source: RSSSF

== National team ==
Date	Venue	Opponents	Score	Competition	Turkey scorers	Match report
February 6, 2008	BJK İnönü Stadium, Istanbul	Sweden	0-0	Friendly		TFF
March 26, 2008	Dinamo Stadium, Minsk	Belarus	2-2	Friendly	Tuncay Şanlı, Tümer Metin	TFF
May 20, 2008	SchücoArena, Bielefeld	Slovakia	1-0	Friendly	Hakan Balta	
May 25, 2008	rewirpowerSTADION, Bochum	Uruguay	2-3	Friendly	Arda Turan, Nihat Kahveci	UEFA
May 29, 2008	MSV-Arena, Duisburg	Finland	2-0	Friendly	Tuncay Şanlı, Semih Şentürk	
June 7, 2008	Stade de Genève, Switzerland	Portugal	0-2	UEFA Euro 2008 Group A		UEFA
June 11, 2008	St. Jakob-Park, Switzerland	Switzerland	2-1	UEFA Euro 2008 Group A	Semih Şentürk (57"), Arda Turan (90")	UEFA
June 15, 2008	Stade de Genève, Switzerland	Czech Republic	3-2	UEFA Euro 2008 Group A	Arda Turan (75"), Nihat Kahveci (2) (87",90")	UEFA
June 20, 2008	Ernst Happel Stadion, Austria	Croatia	0-0 (1-1 AET) (4-2 Pen.)	UEFA Euro 2008 Quarterfinals	Semih Şentürk (120")	UEFA
June 25, 2008	St. Jakob-Park, Switzerland	Germany	2-3	UEFA Euro 2008 Semifinals	Uğur Boral (22"), Semih Şentürk (86")	UEFA
August 20, 2008	Kocaeli İsmetpaşa Stadium, Kocaeli	Chile	1-0	Friendly	Halil Altıntop	
September 6, 2008	Hrazdan Stadium, Yerevan	Armenia	2-0	2010 FIFA World Cup qualification (UEFA) Group 5	Tuncay Şanlı, Semih Şentürk	
September 10, 2008	Şükrü Saracoğlu Stadium, Istanbul	Belgium	1-1	2010 FIFA World Cup qualification (UEFA) Group 5	Emre Belözoğlu	
October 11, 2008	BJK İnönü Stadium, Istanbul	Bosnia and Herzegovina	2-1	2010 FIFA World Cup qualification (UEFA) Group 5	Arda Turan, Mevlüt Erdinç	
October 15, 2008	A. Le Coq Arena, Tallinn	Estonia	0-0	2010 FIFA World Cup qualification (UEFA) Group 5		
November 19, 2008	Ernst Happel Stadion, Vienna	Austria	4-2	Friendly	Mehmet Aurélio Tuncay Şanlı (3)	
February 11, 2009	İzmir Atatürk Stadium, İzmir	Ivory Coast	1-1	Friendly	Gökhan Ünal	
March 28, 2009	Santiago Bernabéu Stadium, Madrid	Spain	0-1	2010 FIFA World Cup qualification (UEFA) Group 5		
April 1, 2009	Ali Sami Yen Stadium, Istanbul	Spain	1-2	2010 FIFA World Cup qualification (UEFA) Group 5	Semih Şentürk	
June 2, 2009	Kayseri Kadir Has Stadium, Kayseri	Azerbaijan	2-0	Friendly	Halil Altıntop, İbrahim Üzülmez	
June 5, 2009	Stade de Gerland, Lyon	France	0-1	Friendly		

== Retirements ==
- Mert Korkmaz
