= 2007–08 in Turkish football =

The 2007–08 season was the 104th season of competitive football in Turkey.

== Managerial changes ==
Name	Club	Date of departure	Replacement	Date of appointment
Jean Tigana	Beşiktaş J.K.	May 17, 2007	Ertuğrul Sağlam	June 1, 2007

== National team ==
Date	Venue	Opponents	Score	Competition	Turkey scorers	Match report
September 8, 2007	Ta' Qali Stadium	Malta	2-2	ECQ	Hakan Şükür, Servet Çetin	UEFA
September 12, 2007	İnönü Stadium	Hungary	3-0	ECQ	Gökhan Ünal, Mehmet Aurelio, Halil Altıntop	UEFA
October 13, 2007	Zimbru Stadium	Moldova	1-1	ECQ	Ümit Karan	UEFA
October 17, 2007	Ali Sami Yen Stadium	Greece	0-1	ECQ	—	UEFA
November 17, 2007	Ullevål Stadium	Norway	2-1	ECQ	Emre Belözoğlu, Nihat Kahveci	UEFA
November 21, 2007	Ali Sami Yen Stadium	Bosnia and Herzegovina	1-0	ECQ	Nihat Kahveci	UEFA

== Honours ==
=== Club Honours ===
Competition	Champion	Details	Match report
Süper Lig	Galatasaray	Turkcell Super League 2007-08	
Fortis Turkey Cup	Kayserispor	Fortis Turkey Cup 2007-08	
Türk Telekom League A	Kocaelispor	Türk Telekom League A 2007-08	
Iddaa League B		Iddaa League B 2007-08	
Turkish Third League		Turkish Third League 2007-08	

=== Player Honours ===
- Player of the Year
  - Semih Şentürk (Fenerbahçe)
- Youth Player of the Year
  - Mehmet Topal (Galatasaray)

Team of the Year

Position	Nat.	Player	Club
GK	(Turkey) (Germany)	Aykut Erçetin	Galatasaray
DF	(Turkey)	Abdurrahman Dereli	Sivasspor
DF	(Turkey)	Servet Çetin	Galatasaray
DF	(Brazil)	Roberto Carlos	Fenerbahçe
DF	(Turkey)	Gökhan Gönül	Fenerbahçe
MF	(Brazil) (Turkey)	Mehmet Aurelio	Fenerbahçe
MF	(Turkey)	Mehmet Topal	Galatasaray
MF	(Turkey)	Arda Turan	Galatasaray
MF	(Turkey)	Mehmet Topuz	Kayserispor
ST	(Turkey) (Germany)	Ümit Karan	Galatasaray
ST	(Turkey)	Semih Şentürk	Fenerbahçe

Top scorer

Nat.	Player	Club	Goals
(Turkey)	Semih Şentürk	Fenerbahçe	17
