= 1976–77 in Turkish football =

The 1976–77 season was the 73rd season of competitive football in Turkey.

== Overview ==
Trabzonspor won their second 1.Lig (First Division) title in 1976–77. Necmi Perekli, forward for Trabzonspor, finished top scorer with 18 goals. Fenerbahçe finished runners-up, while Altay finished third, with both clubs earning a spot in the UEFA Cup. Göztepe and Giresunspor were relegated to the 2.Lig (Second Division), while Ankaragücü and Diyarbakırspor gained promotion to the 1.Lig. Trabzonspor did the double by defeating Beşiktaş in the final of the Turkish Cup. Trabzonspor also won the Cumhurbaşkanlığı Kupası (Super Cup), again defeating Beşiktaş.

The club competed in the 1976–77 European Cup. Having beaten Íþróttabandalag Akraness in the first round, Trabzonspor faced Liverpool in the second round. The club won the first leg 1 – 0 at home, but lost the second leg 0 – 3 in Liverpool. Fenerbahçe and Adanaspor were both knocked out in the first round of the 1976–77 UEFA Cup. Galatasaray reached the second round of the 1976–77 European Cup Winners' Cup before crashing out against R.S.C. Anderlecht.

== Awards ==
- Gol Kralı (Goal King)
  - Necmi Perekli (Trabzonspor) – 18 goals

== Honours ==
Competition	Winner	Runners-up
1.Lig	Trabzonspor (2)	Fenerbahçe (1)
2.Lig	Ankaragücü (2)	Diyarbakırspor (1)
Turkish Cup	Trabzonspor (1)	Beşiktaş (2)
Cumhurbaşkanlığı Kupası	Trabzonspor (2)	Beşiktaş (2)
Başbakanlık Kupası	Beşiktaş (3)	Fenerbahçe (4)

== European qualification ==
Competition	Qualifiers	Reason for qualification
European Cup	Trabzonspor	1st in 1.Lig
UEFA Cup	Fenerbahçe	2nd in 1.Lig
UEFA Cup	Altay	3rd in 1.Lig
European Cup Winners' Cup	Beşiktaş (Qualification awarded as Türkiye Kupası winners Trabzonspor had already qualified for European competition by finishing first in the league)	4th in 1.Lig

== Final league table ==
Pos	Team	Pld	W	D	L	GF	GA	±	Pts	Notes
1	Trabzonspor	30	18	7	5	41	12	+29	43	European Cup
2	Fenerbahçe	30	12	15	3	31	17	+14	39	UEFA Cup
3	Altay	30	11	13	6	31	22	+9	35	UEFA Cup
4	Beşiktaş	30	13	7	10	35	24	+11	33	European Cup Winners' Cup
5	Galatasaray	30	10	13	7	36	26	+10	33	
6	Bursaspor	30	10	11	9	34	30	+4	31	
7	Mersin İdmanyurdu	30	9	13	8	25	26	-1	31	
8	Boluspor	30	9	13	8	32	34	-2	31	
9	Eskişehirspor	30	10	10	10	25	26	-1	30	
10	Samsunspor	30	8	12	10	19	22	-3	28	
11	Orduspor	30	8	12	10	22	27	-5	28	
12	Adana Demirspor	30	6	14	10	21	32	-9	26	
13	Zonguldakspor	30	11	4	15	21	35	-11	26	
14	Adanaspor	30	8	9	13	30	40	-10	25	
15	Göztepe	30	8	9	13	21	31	-10	25	Relegated to the 2.Lig
16	Giresunspor	30	3	10	17	18	38	-20	16	Relegated to the 2.Lig

Notes

- Tiebreakers are the average of goals scored to goals allowed.

== Türkiye Kupası final ==
First leg

1977-05-18

Trabzonspor	1 – 0	Beşiktaş
Ahmet 22'	(Report)

Şehir Stadyumu, Trabzon
Referee: Ziya Türkdoğan (Turkey

Second leg

1977-05-25

Beşiktaş	0 – 0	Trabzonspor
	(Report)

İnönü Stadyumu, Istanbul
Referee: Talat Tokat (Turkey

1977 Türkiye Kupası winners
Trabzonspor
First title

== National team ==
The Turkey national football team competed in eight matches during the 1976–77 season. The team finished with a record of three wins, three draws, and two losses. Cemil Turan scored five goals in eight caps.

22 September 1976

Bulgaria	2 – 2	Turkey
Bonev 10', 42'		Ali Kemal 56', 85'

Sofia

13 October 1976

Turkey	3 – 3	Republic of Ireland
Cemil 51', 70'; Isa 65'		Stapleton 3'; Daly 14'; Waters 80'

Ankara

31 October 1976

Turkey	4 – 0	Malta
Mehmet 22'; Cemil 54', 57', 75'

Ankara

17 November 1976

East Germany	1 – 1	Turkey
Kotte 2' (pen.)		Cemil 31' (pen.)

Dresden

16 February 1977

Turkey	2 – 0	Bulgaria
Ali Kemal 54'; Cemil 55'

Istanbul

23 March 1977

Romania	4 – 0	Turkey
Georgescu 23'; Dumitru 62'; Vigu 75'; Iordănescu 82'

Bucharest

6 April 1977

Turkey	1 – 2	Finland
Mustafa 23'		Paatelainen 64'; Nieminen 76'

Ankara

17 April 1977

Austria	1 – 0	Turkey
Schachner 43'

Wien
