= Bornova Hitab Spor =

Turkish women's football club

- Founded: 2018; 8 years ago
- Ground: Bornova District Stadium
- Coordinates: 38.46349°N 27.20777°E
- Chairman: Hakan Beşyıldız
- League: Turkish Women's Super League
- 2025-26: 12th

Bornova Hitab Spor is a Turkish women's football club based in Bornova district of İzmir Province, western Turkey. It was founded in 2018. The team was promoted to the Turkish Women's Football Super League in 2024.

== History ==
Bornova Hitab Spor is based in Bornova district of İzmir Province. It was founded by the local businessman Hakan Beşyıldız in December 2018. The club name HİTAB is an acronym formed by the initials of his children, Hatice, İrem, Tunahan and Asude Beliz. Club chairman is Hakan Beşyıldız.

The team finished the Group E of the 2021-22 Women's Third League season undefeated, and won the two play-off matches. Team member Ceren Nurlu became top goalscorer of the league with 56 goals. The team was promoted to the Women's Second League.

Bornova Hitab Spor became champion in the 2022-23 Women's Second League season, and was promoted to the Women's First League.

The team finished the 2023-24 Women's First League season as group leader, and was promoted to the Women's Super League after the play-off matches.

On 17 September 2025, following a decision by the Amateur Football Disciplinary Committee, Bornova Hitab Spor was expelled from the 2025-26 Women's Super League with all of their matches forfeited and recorded as 3–0 victories for their opponents.

== Statistics ==
As of 4 May 2025

Season	League	Rank	Pld	W	D	L	GF	GA	GD	Pts
2020–21	Women's Second and Third Leagues were not played									
2021–22	Third League Gr. E	1	10	10	0	0	114	6	+108	30
2021–22	Play-offs	1	2	2	0	0	20	1	+19	6
2022–23	Second League Gr. B	1	12	11	1	0	43	4	+39	34
2023–24	First League Gr. B	1	14	13	1	0	45	6	+39	40
2023–24	Play-offs	2	10	6	3	1	12	6	+5	21
2024-25	Super League	12	26	5	5	16	32	66	-34	17
2025-26	Super League	15	2(^{1})	0	0	2	0	6	-6	0(^{2})
Green marks a season followed by promotion, red a season followed by relegation.

- (^{1}): Season in progress
- (^{2}): On 17 September 2025, following a decision by the Amateur Football Disciplinary Committee, Bornova Hitab Spor was expelled from the league, with all of their matches forfeited and recorded as 3–0 victories for their opponents.

== Current squad ==
No squad list is available.

== Former managers ==
- (Turkey) Gamze İskeçeli (2021-22 Third League),
- (Turkey) Mehmet Berkan Erdoğan (2022-23 Second League),
- (Turkey) Ali Alanç (2024-25)

== Former notable players ==
Cameroon

- Berthe Andiolo
- Brigitte Omboudou

Ghana

- Juanita Aguadze

Nigeria

- Ugochi Emenayo

Turkey

- Esra Erol
- Zeynep Mestan
- Ceren Nurlu

Uganda

- Natasha Shirazi

== Honours ==
Women's Third League
Champions (1): 2021-22

Women's Second League
Champions (1): 2022-23

Women's First League
Runners-up (1): 2023-24

== Kit history ==
2024–25 home	2024–25 away
