= Turkish Women's Football Second League =

Turkish football competition

Women's Second Football League Kadınlar 2. Futbol Ligi
- Founded: 2008
- Country: Turkey
- Divisions: 4
- Number of clubs: 31
- Level on pyramid: 2 (2008–2020); 2 (2021–2022); 3 (2022–)
- Promotion to: Women's 1. Lig
- Relegation to: Women's 3. Lig
- Current champions: Yüksekova Belediyespor (2023–24)
- Website: Official website
- Current: 2026–27

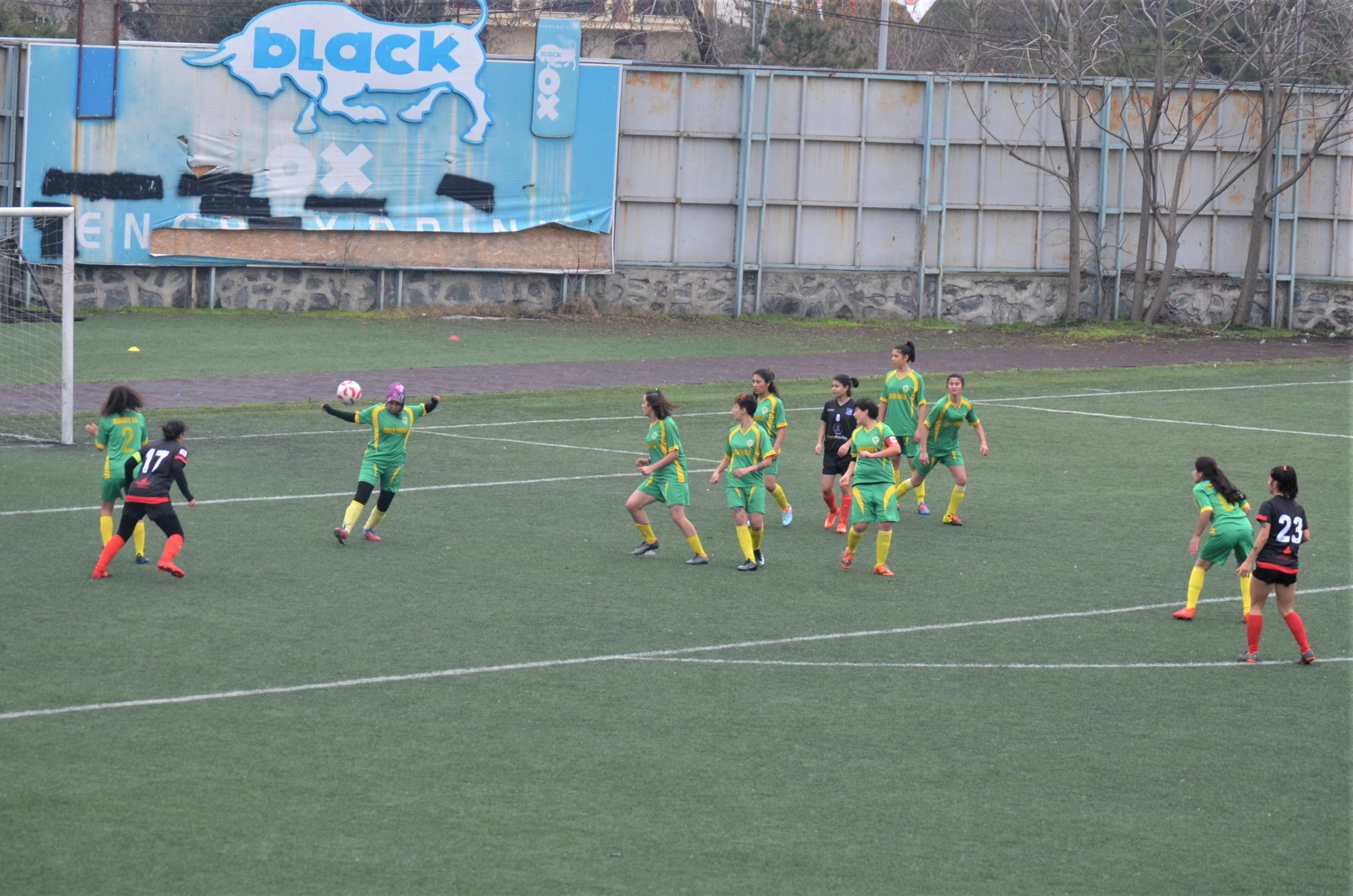
Turkish Women's Second League match between Akdeniz Nurçelik Spor (black/red) and Osmaniye Kadın Spor (green/yellow) in the 2018–19 season.

The Turkish Women's Second Football League (Turkish: Kadınlar 2. Futbol Ligi) is the third tier league competition for women's association football in Turkey.

== Format ==
Number of teams by season archive of the Turkish Football Federation
Second League (2nd tier)

2008–09	19
2009–10	10
2010–11	10
2011–12	39
2012–13	50
2013–14	69
2014–15	12
2015–16	12
2016–17	14
2017–18	16
2018–19	15
2019–20	13

Total: 279

Number of teams by season archive of the Turkish Football Federation
Second League (3rd tier)

2021–22	26
2022–23	20
2023–24	31
2024–25	36
2025–26	30

Total: 143

== Teams promoted to Women's First League ==
Season	Teams to Super League
2008–09	Marmara Üniversitesi Spor, Ümraniye Mevlana Lisesi, Antalyaspor, Adana İdmanyurduspor
2009–10	Düvenciler Lisesispor, Gölcükspor, Yalıspor, Trabzon İdmanocağı
2010–11	Kdz. Ereğlispor, Çamlıcaspor, İzmit Belediyespor, Mersin Camspor, Fomget Gençlik ve Spor
2011–12	Eskişehirspor, Derince Belediyespor
2012–13	İzmit Çenesuyu Plajyoluspor, Marmara Üniversitesi Spor
2013–14	Karşıyaka BESEM Spor, Gazikentspor, İlkadım Belediyesi, Eskişehirspor
2014–15	1207 Antalya Muratpaşa Belediye Spor, Kireçburnu Spor
2015–16	Beşiktaş J.K., Amasya Eğitim Spor
2016–17	Fatih Vatan Spor, Amed SFK
2017–18	ALG Spor, Hakkarigücü Spor
2018–19	Fomget Gençlik ve Spor, Kocaeli Bayan FK, Adana İdmanyurduspor
2019–20	İlkadım Belediyesi, Dudullu Spor, 1207 Antalya Spor, Kayseri Gençler Birliği
Season	Teams to First League
2021–22	Gaziantep Asyaspor, Ünye Gücü FK, Horozkent SK, Bağcılar Evrenspor, Nuhspor, Giresun Sanayispor, Soma Zafer Spor ve Gençlik, Sakarya Kadın Futbol SK, Pendik Çamlıkspor, Hatay Defnespor
2022–23	Bornova Hitabspor, Çatalca Belediyespor, Gazikentspor, Telsizspor, Konya İdmanyurduspor
2023–24	Yüksekova Belediyespor, Gölbaşı Belediyespor, Megapol SK
2024–25	

== Format ==
As of 2023–24 Season, 31 teams compete for promoting to 1st League. They were divided into four groups according to their geographical location. In each group, teams play against each other home-and-away in a round-robin format.

In each group, teams play against each other home-and-away in a round-robin format and play-off rounds. Top 2 teams of each groups will play play-off matches. 3 Teams from play-off rounds will promote to 1st League. At the end of the regular season, the teams that take the last place in their groups are relegated to the Women's 3rd League.

== 2023–24 season ==
The 2023–24 Turkish Women's Second Football League consists of a total of 31 teams in four groups. The group matches of the league are played in 14 rounds between 25 November 2023 and 9 March 2024. The play-off matches will be held in three rounds.

Group	Team	Hometown
A	Bakırköy Yenimahalle FK	İstanbul, Bakırköy
A	Çanakkale Dardanelspor	Çanakkale
A	Düzce Kadın Futbol Spor	Düzce
A	Eskişehirspor	Eskişehir, Tepebaşı
A	Küçükçekmece Akdenizspor	İstanbul, Küçükçekmece
A	Pendik Güvenspor	İstanbul, Pendik
A	Sancaktepe Belediye Gençlikspor	İstanbul, Sancaktepe
A	Tuzla Sahilspor	İstanbul, Tuzla
B	7 Eylül Gençlikspor	Aydın, Efeler
B	Afyon İdmanyurdu Gençlikspor	Afyonkarahisar
B	Antalya Deniz Kadınspor	Antalya, Muratpaşa
B	Denizli Sultanlarspor	Denizli, Merkezefendi
B	Genç Ülkümspor	Konya, Selçuklu
B	Nazilli Belediyespor	Aydın, Nazilli
B	Uşak 64 Belediye Gençlikspor	Uşak
C	Ankara Metropolspor	Ankara, Mamak
C	Gençlerbirliği	Ankara, Yenimahalle
C	Gölbaşı Belediyespor	Ankara, Gölbaşı
C	Karabük Gençlerbirliğispor	Karabük
C	Kastamonugücüspor	Kastamonu
C	Kılıçaslan Yıldızspor	Kayseri, Melikgazi
C	Rusumat-4 Gençlikspor	Ordu, Altınordu
C	Yakacık Genç Erlerbirliğispor	Ankara, Yenimahalle
D	1955 Batman Belediyespor	Batman
D	Erzincan Gençlergücüspor	Erzincan
D	Gaziantep Alfaspor	Gaziantep, Şehitkamil
D	Kahramanmaraş Anadolu Gençlikspor	Kahramanmaraş, Dulkadiroğlu
D	Megapolspor	Gaziantep, Şahinbey
D	Silopi Belediyesi Sportif Faaliyetler SK	Şırnak, Silopi
D	Vangücü SK	Van, İpekyolu
D	Yüksekova Belediyespor	Hakkâri, Yüksekova

== See also ==
- Women's football in Turkey
- Turkish Women's Football Super League
- Turkish Women's Football First League
- Turkish Women's Third Football League
- Turkish Women's Regional Football League
- List of women's football clubs in Turkey
- Turkish women in sports
