= Turkish Women's Football Third League =

Turkish football competition

Women's Third Football League Kadınlar 3. Futbol Ligi
- Founded: 2014
- Country: Turkey
- Divisions: 16
- Number of clubs: 112
- Level on pyramid: 3 (2014–2020); 3 (2021–2022); 4 (2022–)
- Promotion to: Women's 2. Lig
- Current champions: Üsküdar Anadolu (2023–24)
- Website: Official website
- Current: 2026–27

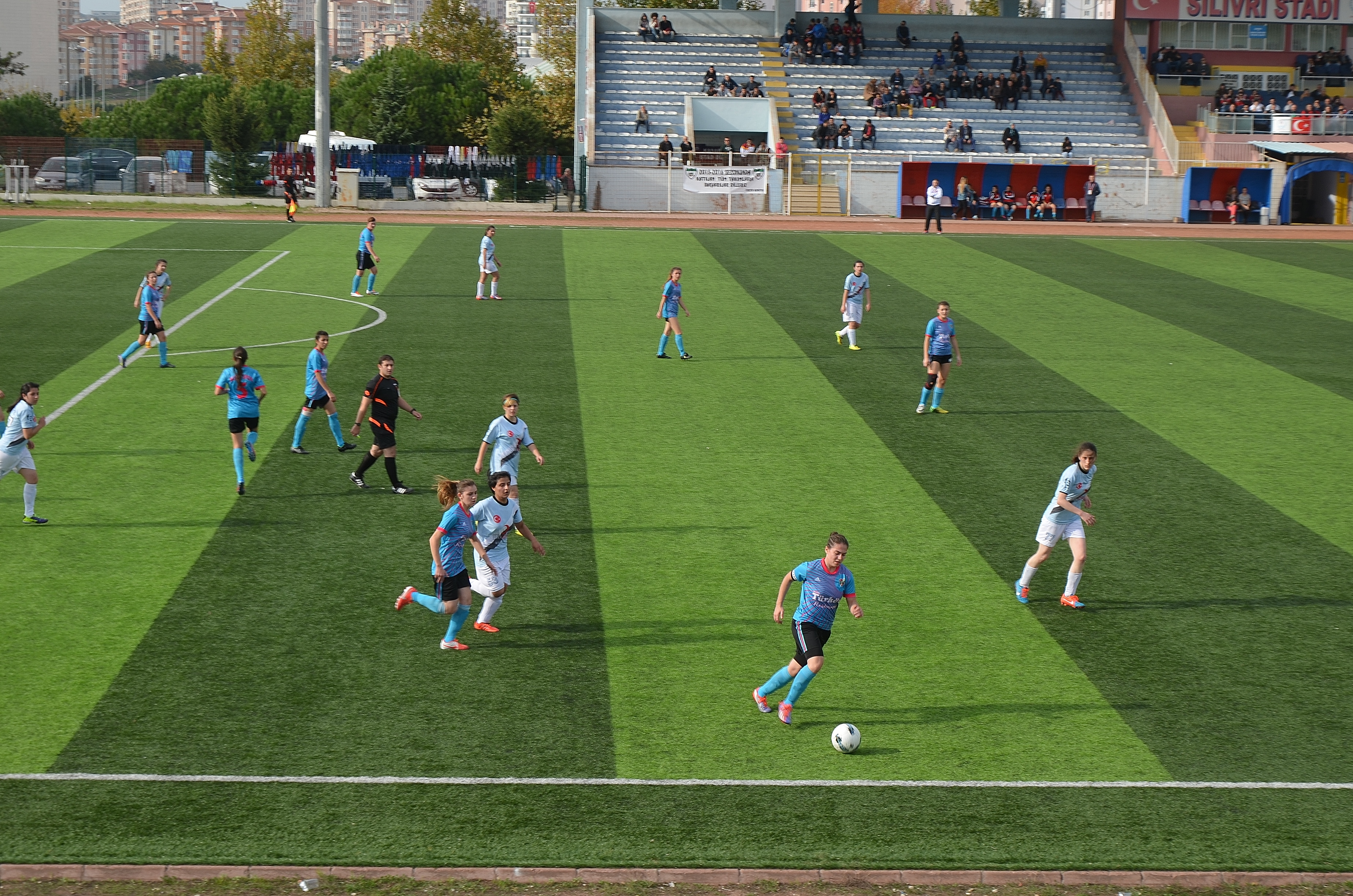
Alibey Spor (blue/black) vs 1453 Maltepe Gençlik Spor (white) in the 2015–16 Women's Third League.

The Turkish Women's Third Football League (Turkish: Kadınlar 3. Futbol Ligi) is the fourth-level league competition for women's association football in Turkey.

== History ==
The Women's Third League was established in 2014 launching its first season in the 2014–15. It replaced the Turkish Women's Regional Football League, which existed two seasons in 2009–10 and 2010–11.

== Format ==
As of the 2023–24 season, 112 teams compete for promoting to the Women's Second League. They are divided into 16 groups according to their geographical location. In each group, teams play against each other home-and-away in a round-robin format and play-off rounds. Top 2 teams of each groups will play play-off matches. 3 Teams from play-off rounds will promote to Women's Second League.

Number of teams by season archive of the Turkish Football Federation
Third League (3rd tier)

2014–15	57
2015–16	82
2016–17	103
2017–18	98
2018–19	85
2019–20	79

Total: 504

Number of teams by season archive of the Turkish Football Federation
Third League (4th tier)

2021-22	85
2022-23	91
2023-24	112
2024-25	151

Total: 439

== Teams promoted to Women's Second League ==
Season	Teams
2014–15	Beşiktaş J.K., Ağrı Birlikspor, Van Büyükşehir Belediyespor, Yahya Mazlum Halk Eğitim Merkezispor
2015–16	Kocaeli Harb-İşspor, Akdeniz Nurçelikspor, Maraşgücüspor, Konya İdmanyurduspor, Amed S.K., Fatih Vatan Spor
2016–17	Fomget Gençlik ve Spor, ALG Spor, Alpler Gençlik ve Spor, Sivas Gazi Lisesispor
2017–18	Kocaeli Bayan FK, 7 Eylül Gençlikspor, Aksaray Hasandağıspor, Dicle Aslanspor
2018–19	1955 Batman Belediyespor, Kayseri Gençler Birliği, Dudullu Spor
2019–20	Pendik Çamlıkspor, Ünyegücü FK, Horozkent SK, Giresun Sanayispor, Ankara Metropolspor, Konya İdmanyurduspor, Tavla Gençlikspor, Bağcılar Evrenspor, Nuhspor, Soğanlı Kanalboyu Nilüferspor, Soma Zaferspor ve Gençlik, Gaziantep Karataşspor, Erzincan Gençlergücüspor, Kılıçaslan Yıldızspor, Kemer FK , Yüksekova Belediyespor, Sakarya Ankaspor Bayan FK, Telsizspor, Kahramanmaraş Anadolu Gençlikspor, Afyon İdman Yurdu, Tuzla Sahilspor
2021–22	Bornova Hitabspor, Rusumat-4 Gençlikspor, Gölbaşı Belediyespor, Çatalca Belediyespor, 1955 Batman Belediyespor, Düzce Kadın Futbol Spor, Konyaaltı Gençlikspor, Kastamonugücüspor
2022–23	Denizli Sultanlarspor, Beykentspor, Pendik Güvenspor, Uşak 64 Belediye Gençlikspor, Gaziantep Alfaspor, Karabük Gençlerbirliği Spor, Ülküm Spor ve Gençlik, Bakırköy Yenimahelle FK, Çanakkale Dardanelspor, Gençlerbirliği, Sancaktepe Belediye Gençlikspor, Nazilli Belediyespor, Yakacık Genç Erlerbirliği Spor, Vangücü SK, Eskişehirspor, Silopi Belediye Gençlikspor
2023–24	Üsküdar Anadolu, Uludağspor, Karadeniz Ereğli Lisesi SK, Bursa Soğanlıspor, Aile ve Sosyal Politikalar Gençlik ve Spor, Bağcılar SK, Haymana Belediyespor, Tekirdağ Gençlik Hizmetleri ve Spor
2024–25	

== See also ==
- Women's football in Turkey
- Turkish Women's Football Super League
- Turkish Women's Football First League
- Turkish Women's Second Football League
- Turkish Women's Regional Football League
- List of women's football clubs in Turkey
- Turkish women in sports
