= 2023–24 Galatasaray S.K. (women's football) season =

Galatasaray Petrol Ofisi
2023–24 season
- Chairman: Dursun Özbek
- Head coach: Metin Ülgen
- Stadium: Florya Metin Oktay Facilities
- Turkish Women's Football Super League: 1st
- Top goalscorer: League: Ebru Topçu (15); All: Ebru Topçu (15)

The 2023–24 season was the 3rd season in the existence of Galatasaray S.K. women's football team and the club's third consecutive season in the top flight of Turkish football.

== Overview ==
On 1 August, Galatasaray Women's Football Team started its preparations for the new season at Florya Metin Oktay Facilities.

On 1 August 2023–24 Season Fixtures were drawn in Turkcell Women's Football Super League.

On 2 October, Team Captain Emine Ecem Esen had arthroscopic meniscus surgery.

== Kits ==
- Supplier: Nike
- Name sponsor: Petrol Ofisi
- Main sponsor: Petrol Ofisi
- Back sponsor: —
- Sleeve sponsor: —
- Short sponsor: Tacirler
- Socks sponsor: —

Home
Away
Third
Home alt.
Home alt.2
Goalkeeper 1
Goalkeeper 2
Goalkeeper 3

== Squad information ==
As of 26 March 2024

No.	Player	Nat.	Position(s)	Signed in	Date of birth (Age)	Signed from
Goalkeepers
1	Gamze Nur Yaman	(Turkey)	GK	2022	25 April 1999 (age 27)	(Ukraine) WFC Zhytlobud-2 Kharkiv
17	Handan Kurğa	(Turkey)	GK	2022	10 September 1993 (age 33)	(Turkey) Konak Belediyespor
23	Müge İnan	(Turkey)	GK	2022	5 January 1994 (age 32)	(Turkey) Fatih Karagümrük
26	Alanur Usta	(Turkey)	GK	2023	26 September 2007 (age 19)	(Turkey) Bursa Soğanlı Spor Kulübü
Defenders
3	Rabia Nur Küçük	(Turkey)	DF	2023	29 August 2003 (age 23)	(Turkey) Fomget Gençlik ve Spor
5	Eda Karataş	(Turkey)	DF	2023	15 June 1995 (age 31)	(Turkey) ALG Spor
13	Fatma Sare Öztürk	(Turkey)	DF	2022	5 July 2000 (age 26)	(Turkey) Trabzonspor
20	Berna Yeniçeri	(Turkey)	DF	2022	26 January 1996 (age 30)	(Turkey) Beşiktaş
25	Lyubov Shmatko	(Ukraine)	DF	2023	25 October 1993 (age 33)	(Turkey) Fomget Gençlik ve Spor
Midfielders
8	Emine Ecem Esen (captain)	(Turkey)	MF	2022	3 May 1994 (age 32)	(Turkey) ALG Spor
10	İsmigül Yalçıner	(Turkey)	MF	2021	20 October 1994 (age 32)	(Turkey) Kireçburnu Spor
12	Helin Erbulun	(Turkey)	MF	2023	22 December 2006 (age 19)	(Turkey) Youth system
15	Chinaza Uchendu	(Nigeria)	MF	2024	3 December 1997 (age 28)	(South Korea) Gyeongju KHNP WFC
18	Kristina Bakarandze	(Azerbaijan)	MF	2022	19 May 1998 (age 28)	(Turkey) ALG Spor
19	Zehra Yılmaz	(Turkey)	MF	2022	5 July 2002 (age 24)	(Turkey) Bursa Soğanlı Spor Kulübü
22	Nazlıcan Parlak	(Turkey) (Azerbaijan)	MF	2023	27 May 1993 (age 33)	(Turkey) Fenerbahçe
24	Arzu Akkurt	(Turkey)	MF	2021	1 July 2004 (age 22)	(Turkey) 1207 Antalya Spor
30	Berra Pekgöz	(Turkey)	MF	2023	18 June 2007 (age 19)	(Turkey) Tunç Spor
38	Arzu Karabulut	(Turkey)	MF	2024	30 January 1991 (age 35)	(Turkey) ALG Spor
Forwards
7	Mariem Houij	(Tunisia)	FW	2023	8 August 1994 (age 32)	(Turkey) ALG Spor
9	Elanur Laçın	(Turkey)	FW	2021	4 August 2004 (age 22)	(Turkey) Kireçburnu Spor
11	Monique Rith	(Democratic Republic of the Congo)	FW	2023	15 October 1997 (age 29)	(Turkey) ALG Spor
16	Ebru Topçu	(Turkey)	FW	2022	27 August 1996 (age 30)	(Turkey) ALG Spor
77	Megi Doçi	(Albania)	FW	2024	14 October 1996 (age 30)	(Albania) KFF Vllaznia Shkodër
88	Siomala Mapepa	(Zambia)	FW	2024	4 June 2002 (age 24)	Elite Ladies
99	Benan Altıntaş	(Turkey)	FW	2023	10 November 2001 (age 24)	(Turkey) Fomget Gençlik ve Spor
Player(s) transferred out during this season
21	Didem Dülber	(Turkey)	MF	2021	21 March 2001 (age 25)	(Turkey) ALG Spor
27	Naomie Kabakaba	(Democratic Republic of the Congo)	DF	2023	4 February 1998 (age 28)	(Democratic Republic of the Congo) TP Mazembe

== New contracts and transfers ==
=== Contract extensions ===
Date	No.	Pos.	Nat.	Player	Status	Contract length	Contract ends	Source
1 August 2023	8	MF	(Turkey)	Emine Ecem Esen	Extended	One-year	30 June 2024	
1 August 2023	9	FW	(Turkey)	Elanur Laçın	Extended	One-year	30 June 2024	
1 August 2023	10	MF	(Turkey)	İsmigül Yalçıner	Extended	One-year	30 June 2024	
1 August 2023	16	FW	(Turkey)	Ebru Topçu	Extended	One-year	30 June 2024	
1 August 2023	17	GK	(Turkey)	Handan Kurğa	Extended	One-year	30 June 2024	
1 August 2023	18	MF	(Azerbaijan)	Kristina Bakarandze	Extended	One-year	30 June 2024	
1 August 2023	19	MF	(Turkey)	Zehra Yılmaz	Extended	One-year	30 June 2024	
1 August 2023	20	DF	(Turkey)	Berna Yeniçeri	Extended	One-year	30 June 2024	
1 August 2023	21	MF	(Turkey)	Didem Dülber	Extended	One-year	30 June 2024	
1 August 2023	24	MF	(Turkey)	Arzu Akkurt	Extended	One-year	30 June 2024	
1 August 2023	27	DF	(Democratic Republic of the Congo)	Naomie Kabakaba	Extended	One-year	30 June 2024	
1 August 2023	32	GK	(Turkey)	Gamze Nur Yaman	Extended	One-year	30 June 2024	
1 August 2023	61	DF	(Turkey)	Fatma Sare Öztürk	Extended	One-year	30 June 2024	
1 August 2023	88	GK	(Turkey)	Müge İnan	Extended	One-year	30 June 2024	

=== Transfers in ===
Date	No.	Pos.	Player	Transferred from	Fee	Source
4 August 2023	5	DF	(Turkey) Eda Karataş	(Turkey) ALG Spor	Undisclosed	
4 August 2023	99	FW	(Turkey) Benan Altıntaş	(Turkey) Fomget Gençlik ve Spor	Undisclosed	
4 August 2023	3	DF	(Turkey) Rabia Nur Küçük	(Turkey) Fomget Gençlik ve Spor	Undisclosed	
4 August 2023	11	FW	(Democratic Republic of the Congo) Monique Rith	(Turkey) ALG Spor	Undisclosed	
4 August 2023	7	FW	(Tunisia) Mariem Houij	(Turkey) ALG Spor	Undisclosed	
4 August 2023	25	DF	(Ukraine) Lyubov Shmatko	(Turkey) Fomget Gençlik ve Spor	Undisclosed	
24 August 2023	30	MF	(Turkey) Berra Pekgöz	(Turkey) Tunç Spor	Undisclosed	
14 September 2023	22	MF	(Turkey) Nazlıcan Parlak	(Turkey) Fenerbahçe	Undisclosed	
14 November 2023	26	GK	(Turkey) Alanur Usta	(Turkey) Bursa Soğanlı Spor Kulübü	Undisclosed	
17 January 2024	77	FW	(Albania) Megi Doçi	(Albania) KFF Vllaznia Shkodër	Undisclosed	
19 January 2024	38	MF	(Turkey) Arzu Karabulut	(Turkey) ALG Spor	Undisclosed	
18 March 2024	15	MF	(Nigeria) Chinaza Uchendu	(South Korea) Gyeongju KHNP WFC	Undisclosed	
23 March 2024	88	FW	(Zambia) Siomala Mapepa	Elite Ladies	Undisclosed	

=== Transfers out ===
Date	No.	Pos.	Player	Transferred to	Fee	Source
20 May 2023	4	DF	(China) Li Jiayue	(China) Shanghai Shengli	End of contract	
22 June 2023	28	MF	(Turkey) Zeynep Ece Güneş	(Turkey) Fatih Karagümrük	End of contract	
27 June 2023	6	DF	(Turkey) Derya Arhan	(Turkey) Beylerbeyi Spor Kulübü	End of contract	
30 June 2023	5	DF	(Serbia) Milica Denda		End of contract	
5 July 2023	2	DF	(Turkey) İrem Barut	(Turkey) Kdz. Ereğli Belediye Spor	End of contract	
5 July 2023	3	DF	(Turkey) İlayda Uğur	(Turkey) Bornova Hitab Spor	End of contract	
5 July 2023	7	FW	(Turkey) Erva Karaovalı	(Turkey) Kocaeli Bayan Futbol Kulübü	End of contract	
5 July 2023	33	MF	(Turkey) Serpil Özer	(Turkey) Bornova Hitab Spor	End of contract	
8 July 2023	23	MF	(Turkey) İlayda Civelek	(Turkey) Fenerbahçe	End of contract	
12 July 2023	22	FW	(South Africa) Elena Gracinda Santos	(Turkey) Fatih Karagümrük	End of contract	
20 July 2023	13	MF	(Turkey) Birgül Sadıkoğlu	(Turkey) Fomget Gençlik ve Spor	End of contract	
20 July 2023	11	FW	(Turkey) Yağmur Uraz	(Turkey) Fenerbahçe	End of contract	
31 July 2023	25	GK	(Turkey) Büşra Kenet	(Turkey) Fomget Gençlik ve Spor	End of contract	
17 January 2024	27	DF	(Democratic Republic of the Congo) Naomie Kabakaba	(Saudi Arabia) Al-Ahli	Undisclosed	
26 January 2024	21	MF	(Turkey) Didem Dülber	(Turkey) Trabzonspor	Undisclosed	

== Management team ==
Position	Staff
Head coach	(Turkey) Metin Ülgen
Sporting Director	(Turkey) Vahit Mert
Assistant Sporting Director	(Turkey) Gülfem Kocaoğlu
Assistant Coach	(Turkey) Hilal Başkol
Goalkeeping Coach	(Turkey) Yunus Ulucan
Physiotherapist	(Turkey) Gülin Köseoğlu
Analyst	(Turkey) Birkan İpek

Last updated: 1 August 2023.
Source: Kadın Futbol Takımı İdari ve Teknik Kadro – GALATASARAY.ORG

== Pre-season and friendlies ==
Win Draw Loss Fixtures

=== Pre-season ===
14 August 2023	Beylerbeyi Spor Kulübü	3–1	Galatasaray
		Report

20 August 2023	Kdz. Ereğli Belediye Spor	0–1	Galatasaray
16:00 TRT (UTC+3)		Report

4 October 2023	Galatasaray	3–1	İstanbul Telsiz Spor
		Report

=== Mid-season ===
v

== Competitions ==
=== Overall record ===
Competition	First match	Last match	Starting round	Final position	Record							
Competition	First match	Last match	Starting round	Final position	Pld	W	D	L	GF	GA	GD	Win %
Super League	27 August 2023	5 May 2024	Matchday 1	Winners	30	23	2	5	71	29	+42	76.67
Total					30	23	2	5	71	29	+42	76.67

Last updated: 5 May 2024
Source: FootyStats

=== Turkish Women's Football Super League ===
==== League table ====
Pos	Team	Pld	W	D	L	GF	GA	GD	Pts	Qualification or relegation
1	Galatasaray	30	23	2	5	71	29	+42	71	Qualification for the Champions League first round
2	Ankara BB FOMGET	30	22	3	5	78	21	+57	69	
3	Fenerbahçe	30	21	3	6	82	27	+55	66	
4	Beşiktaş	30	19	2	9	71	29	+42	59	
5	Beylerbeyi	30	17	6	7	68	25	+43	57	

Source: TFF.org

==== Results summary ====
Overall								Home						Away					
Pld	W	D	L	GF	GA	GD	Pts	W	D	L	GF	GA	GD	W	D	L	GF	GA	GD
30	23	2	5	71	29	+42	71	13	1	1	40	12	+28	10	1	4	31	17	+14

Last updated: 5 May 2024.
Source: Competitive matches

==== Results by matchday ====
Round	1	2	3	4	5	6	7	8	9	10	11	12	13	14	15	16	17	18	19	20	21	22	23	24	25	26	27	28	29	30
Ground	H	A	H	A	A	H	A	H	A	H	A	H	A	H	A	A	H	A	H	H	A	H	A	H	A	H	A	H	A	H
Result	W	W	W	W	L	W	W	W	W	W	W	W	W	W	L	D	W	W	L	W	W	D	W	W	L	W	L	W	W	W
Position	3	3	2	2	4	3	3	3	3	1	1	1	1	1	1	2	2	1	2	1	1	1	1	1	1	1	1	1	1	1

Updated to match(es) played on 5 May 2024. Source: Competitive matches
A = Away; H = Home; W = Win; D = Draw; L = Loss

==== Matches ====
27 August 2023 1	Galatasaray	2–0	Fatih Karagümrük	Istanbul
16:00 TRT (UTC+3)	Topçu 11'; Houij (yellow card) 39'; Kabakaba 44'; Shmatko (yellow card) 58'; Karataş (yellow card) 74'	Report 1 Report 2	Santos (yellow card) 56'; Öztürk (yellow card) 68'	Stadium: Florya Metin Oktay Facilities; Referee: Emine Öz; Assistant referees: Figen Eleman, Yücel Alkaşi; Fourth official: Mehmet Alperen Güçyetmez

2 September 2023 2	Fatih Vatan Spor	0–4	Galatasaray	Istanbul
17:00 TRT (UTC+3)	Açar (yellow card) 53'; Gültekin (yellow card) 89'	Report 1 Report 2	Kabakaba 3'; Rith 65'; Houij (yellow card) 68'; Laçın 80'; Yılmaz 88'; Bakarandze (yellow card) (yellow-red card) 90+7'	Stadium: Fatih Mimar Sinan Stadium; Referee: Abdullah Murat Yoldaş; Assistant referees: Hüseyin Can, Esra Arıkboğa; Fourth official: Hatem Yarar

10 September 2023 3	Galatasaray	1–0	Beylerbeyi Spor Kulübü	Istanbul
16:00 TRT (UTC+3)	Topçu 26'; Öztürk (yellow card) 88'; Kabakaba (yellow card) 90'; Altıntaş (yellow card) 90+1'	Report 1 Report 2	Achiaa (yellow card) 16'; Bella (yellow card) 45'; Cabral (yellow card) 70'; İçen (yellow card) 90+6'	Stadium: Florya Metin Oktay Facilities; Referee: Melek Dakan; Assistant referees: Elçin Kaba, Emrah Çakır; Fourth official: Asen Albayrak

16 September 2023 4	Gaziantep Asyaspor	0–2	Galatasaray	Gaziantep
16:00 TRT (UTC+3)		Report 1 Report 2	Shmatko (yellow card) 21'; Topçu 45+3' (pen.), 83'; Karataş (yellow card) 76'; Küçük (yellow card) 88'	Stadium: Mehmet Hayri Özkeçeci Stadyumu; Referee: Esra Sağlam; Assistant referees: Emine Erim, Neclan Çiçek; Fourth official: Turhan Beyke

1 October 2023 5	Beşiktaş	2–0	Galatasaray	Gaziosmanpaşa, Istanbul
12:00 TRT (UTC+3)	Aleksić 9'; Öztürk 12' (o.g.); Polat (yellow card) 57'; Karagenç (yellow card) 62'; Yektaei (yellow card) 83'	Report 1 Report 2	Shmatko (yellow card) 64'	Stadium: İBB GOP Halit Kıvanç Şehir Stadı; Referee: Burak Akyel; Assistant referees: Gülşah Nur Şen, Resul Emre Göçmen; Fourth official: Furkan Nizamoğlu

8 October 2023 6	Galatasaray	3–0	Amed Sportif Faaliyetler	Istanbul
12:00 TRT (UTC+3)	Yeniçeri 24'; Rith 34'; Karataş (yellow card) 51'; Kabakaba 79'	Report 1 Report 2	Subay (yellow card) 90+3'	Stadium: Florya Metin Oktay Facilities; Referee: İsmet Yılmaz; Assistant referees: Merve Turan, Atakan Kandır; Fourth official: İbrahim Baran Aksongür

15 October 2023 7	Trabzonspor	0–2	Galatasaray	Trabzon
13:30 TRT (UTC+3)	Şentürk (yellow card) 85'	Report 1 Report 2	Topçu 22' (pen.), 52'; Karataş (yellow card) 85'	Stadium: Trabzonspor Kadir Özcan Tesisleri; Referee: Berkay Yavuz; Assistant referees: Zelife Sağer, Elif Kurt; Fourth official: Ayberg Öz

21 October 2023 8	Galatasaray	5–2	Ataşehir Belediyespor	Istanbul
12:00 TRT (UTC+3)	Altıntaş 14'; Houij 37' (pen.); Topçu 60'; Shmatko (yellow card) 70'; Yeniçeri (yellow card) 81'; Akkurt 87', 90+5'	Report 1 Report 2	Yılmaz (yellow card) 18'; Ataol (yellow card) 38'; Lawal 51'; Eroğlu (yellow card) 59'; Iaderosa 90+4'	Stadium: Florya Metin Oktay Facilities; Referee: Elif Köroğlu; Assistant referees: Nimet Altunkıran, Semra Bulut; Fourth official: Yiğit Karabudak

5 November 2023 9	Adana İdman Yurdu	1–3	Galatasaray	Adana
14:00 TRT (UTC+3)	Yılmaz 54'; Sofiyat (yellow card) 60'	Report 1 Report 2	Laçın 18'; Bakarandze 24'; Houij 37' (pen.)	Stadium: Muharrem Gülergin Futbol Sahası; Referee: Hasan Can Tamtekin; Assistant referees: Abdullah Semerci, Alicem Turunç; Fourth official: Berrin Toklu

12 November 2023 10	Galatasaray	2–1	Fenerbahçe	Istanbul
14:00 TRT (UTC+3)	Yeniçeri (yellow card) 45+2'; Kara 60' (o.g.); Kurğa (yellow card) 64'; Rith 90+7'	Report 1 Report 2	Göksu (yellow card) 38'; Hız (yellow card) 51'; Çal (yellow card) 57'; Uraz 79'	Stadium: Florya Metin Oktay Facilities; Referee: Ertuğrul Yolcu; Assistant referees: Yunus Öncebe, Mehmet Ali Yılmaz; Fourth official: Büşra Aydoğdu

19 November 2023 11	Hakkarigücü Spor	2–4	Galatasaray	Hakkâri
12:00 TRT (UTC+3)	Sancar 1'; Chanda (yellow card) 31'; Adam 71'	Report 1 Report 2	Topçu 2', 11'; Kabakaba 47', 69' (yellow card) 77'	Stadium: Merzan Şehir Stadı; Referee: Yunus Gül; Assistant referees: Serkan Kaya, İsa Polat; Fourth official: Recep Afşin

25 November 2023 12	Galatasaray	2–1	Fomget Gençlik ve Spor	Istanbul
14:00 TRT (UTC+3)	Topçu (yellow card) 19'; Bakarandze 35' (yellow card) 45+2'; Rith (yellow card) 67'; Küçük (yellow card) 89'; Esen 90'	Report 1 Report 2	Ovdiychuk (yellow card) 2' (goal) 42'; Seyfatdinova (yellow card) 27'; Sadıkoğlu (yellow card) 38'; Kuč (yellow card) 45+3'; Şahin (yellow card) 61'; Özev (yellow card) 75'; Bulatović (yellow card) 83'	Stadium: Florya Metin Oktay Facilities; Referee: Ali Eren Sayın; Assistant referees: Gürcan Uslu, Batuhan Akkuş; Fourth official: Muhammed Burak Tufan

10 December 2023 13	Kdz. Ereğli Belediye Spor	1–2	Galatasaray	Zonguldak
11:00 TRT (UTC+3)	Nabweteme 3'; Çetin (yellow card) 56'; Koçer (yellow card) 66'	Report 1 Report 2	Rith 16' (yellow card) 78'; Esen 21' (yellow card) 80'; Shmatko (yellow card) 70'	Stadium: Şehit Vefa Karakurdu Stadı; Referee: Tuğba Üçüncü; Assistant referees: Ömer Faruk Uyar, Mert Tekgül; Fourth official: Abdurrahman Faruk Avşar

10 January 2024 14	Galatasaray	6–0	1207 Antalya Spor	Istanbul
14:00 TRT (UTC+3)	Rith 21', 32'; Altıntaş 37'; Topçu 64'; Akkurt 85'; Kabakaba 90'	Report 1 Report 2	Sawadogo (yellow card) 31'	Stadium: Florya Metin Oktay Facilities; Referee: Sevcan Özkar; Assistant referees: Önder Demir, Ömer Faruk Şahin; Fourth official: Damla Doğan Genç

23 December 2023 15	ALG Spor	4–1	Galatasaray	Gaziantep
14:00 TRT (UTC+3)	Trišić 57'; Olkhovik 69'; Seteco 75'; Demba 90+7'	Report 1 Report 2	Öztürk (yellow card) 23'; Rith (yellow card) 45+1'; Laçın 81'	Stadium: Batur Stadium; Referee: Ali Emir Yolcu; Assistant referees: İsmail Çiriş, Mehmet Ali Damlar; Fourth official: Berrin Toklu

14 January 2024 16	Fatih Karagümrük	0–0	Galatasaray	Fatih, Istanbul
14:00 TRT (UTC+3)	Rouamba (yellow card) 83'; Traoré (yellow card) 87'	Report 1 Report 2	Shmatko (yellow card) 32'	Stadium: Vefa Stadium; Referee: Oğuzhan Demir; Assistant referees: Ferit Özdemir, Emre Kaya; Fourth official: Gökhan Yılmaz

20 January 2024 17	Galatasaray	1–0	Fatih Vatan Spor	Istanbul
14:00 TRT (UTC+3)	Doçi (yellow card) 33'; Topçu 45+1'; Esen (yellow card) 60'	Report 1 Report 2	Bozdağ (yellow card) 39'	Stadium: Florya Metin Oktay Facilities; Referee: Oğuzhan Talha Karakuş; Assistant referees: Baransel Siyavuş, Ali İmran Genli; Fourth official: Gülhan Terlikli

28 January 2024 18	Beylerbeyi Spor Kulübü	0–1	Galatasaray	Istanbul
15:00 TRT (UTC+3)	Şahin (yellow card) 55'; Santos (yellow card) End of the match'	Report 1 Report 2	Karabulut 54'; Öztürk (yellow card) 85'	Stadium: Beylerbeyi 75. Yıl Stadium; Referee: Mehmet Alperen Güçyetmez; Assistant referees: Semra Bulut, Esra Arıkboğa; Fourth official: Deniz Güven

4 February 2024 19	Galatasaray	1–4	Gaziantep Asyaspor	Istanbul
13:00 TRT (UTC+3)	Karabulut 26'; Shmatko (yellow card) 75'; Karataş (yellow card) 89'; Laçın (yellow card) 90+1'	Report 1 Report 2	Esen 13' (o.g.); Nkor 24'; Karadağ (yellow card) 43'; Bella 45+4'; Akaffou (yellow card) (yellow-red card) 70'; Kesgin (yellow card) 86'; Matveeva 90'	Stadium: Florya Metin Oktay Facilities; Referee: Alperen Aksu; Assistant referees: Alper Çakır, Melis Ceyda Güzel; Fourth official: Gizem Arık

11 February 2024 20	Galatasaray	2–1	Beşiktaş	Istanbul
14:00 TRT (UTC+3)	Yeniçeri (yellow card) 52'; Karagenç 81' (o.g.); Topçu 88'	Report 1 Report 2	Halilaj (yellow card) 43' (goal) 77' (pen.); Fishley (yellow card) 65'	Stadium: Florya Metin Oktay Facilities; Referee: Abdullah Murat Yoldaş; Assistant referees: Özgür Öztürk, Can Orhan Çelebi; Fourth official: Yasin Kılıç

17 February 2024 21	Amed Sportif Faaliyetler	1–2	Galatasaray	Diyarbakır
12:00 TRT (UTC+3)	Costa 66' (yellow card) (yellow-red card) 90+5'; Dolu (yellow card) 86'; Alçu (yellow card) 89'; Peterson-Kundok (yellow card) (yellow-red card) 90+5'	Report 1 Report 2	Rith 22'; Karabulut 77'	Stadium: Amedspor Şehmus Özer Tesisleri; Referee: Cihan Ölmez; Assistant referees: Halil Aslandağ, İbrahim Aksoy; Fourth official: Zeynep Acar

3 March 2024 22	Galatasaray	0–0	Trabzonspor	Istanbul
14:00 TRT (UTC+3)		Report 1 Report 2	Sharifova (yellow card) 90'; Çevik (yellow card) 90+2'; Şentürk (yellow card) 90+6'	Stadium: Florya Metin Oktay Facilities; Referee: Nevzat Okat; Assistant referees: Ahmet Dilek, Halil Sonkaya; Fourth official: Yusuf Korkmaz

9 March 2024 23	Ataşehir Belediyespor	1–3	Galatasaray	Ataşehir, Istanbul
12:00 TRT (UTC+3)	Akaba (yellow card) 57'; Çelebi (yellow card) 62'; Mirr 90+4'	Report 1 Report 2	Doçi 15' (pen.); Karabulut 45+2', 75'; Yeniçeri (yellow card) 80'	Stadium: İBB Esatpaşa Stadı; Referee: Emine Öz; Assistant referees: Neslihan Koç, Ceren Hanife Bahadır; Fourth official: İsmail Barkın Özsavlu

17 March 2024 24	Galatasaray	7–0	Adana İdman Yurdu	Istanbul
14:00 TRT (UTC+3)	Doçi 3'; Topçu 10'; Karabulut 13'; Edzoumou 44' (o.g.); Laçın 48', 55', 72'	Report 1 Report 2		Stadium: Florya Metin Oktay Facilities; Referee: Batuhan Kösem; Assistant referees: Batuhan Akkuş, Mehmet Yıldız; Fourth official: Tayfun Demirkoparan

24 March 2024 25	Fenerbahçe	2–1	Galatasaray	Istanbul
14:00 TRT (UTC+3)	Türkoğlu 9'; Coleman 70'; Çal (yellow card) 80'	Report 1 Report 2	Karabulut 4'; Bakarandze (yellow card) 19'; Yeniçeri (yellow card) 60'; Esen (yellow card) 89'	Stadium: Dereağzı Lefter Küçükandonyadis Tesisleri; Referee: Burak Taşkınsoy; Assistant referees: Eshan Kartal, Mesut Çerko; Fourth official: Mehmet Alperen Güçyetmez

30 March 2024 26	Galatasaray	2–1	Hakkarigücü Spor	Istanbul
12:00 TRT (UTC+3)	Karabulut 30'; Shmatko (yellow card) 63' (goal) 90+5'	Report 1 Report 2	Ngah 74'; Ologbosere (yellow card) 84'	Stadium: Florya Metin Oktay Facilities; Referee: Veysel Karani Özkan; Assistant referees: Yunus Çiftçi, Furkan Hacıoğlu; Fourth official: Gizem Arık

14 April 2024 27	Fomget Gençlik ve Spor	3–2	Galatasaray	Sincan, Ankara
14:00 TRT (UTC+3)	Ruth 38'; Marcano 68'; Ovdiychuk 82'	Report 1 Report 2	Esen (yellow card) 32'; Karabulut 45+1' (yellow card) 90+5'; Topçu 78' (pen.)	Stadium: Osmanlı Stadium; Referee: Özgür Reha Alıcı; Assistant referees: Ahmet Ulu, Erkan Kırçıl; Fourth official: Celal Emre Gömeç

21 April 2024 28	Galatasaray	4–2	Kdz. Ereğli Belediye Spor	Istanbul
14:00 TRT (UTC+3)	Topçu 60'; Rith 70'; Shmatko 88'; Doçi 90+4' (yellow card) (yellow-red card) 90+4'	Report 1 Report 2	Nabweteme 28' (pen.) 90+6' (pen.)	Stadium: Florya Metin Oktay Facilities; Referee: Ceyhun Elmas; Assistant referees: Neslihan Koç, Semih Tuna; Fourth official: Tolga Gökgöz

28 April 2024 29	1207 Antalya Spor	0–4	Galatasaray	Antalya
14:00 TRT (UTC+3)	Doudjon (yellow card) 15'; Sivrikaya (yellow card) 86'	Report 1 Report 2	Yeniçeri 3'; Karataş 20'; Laçın 65', 85' (yellow card) 86'	Stadium: Zeytinköy 2 Nolu Saha; Referee: Halim Kolancı; Assistant referees: Osman Arslan, Sultan Ahmet Demir; Fourth official: Erkan Çakaroğlu

5 May 2024 30	Galatasaray	2–0	ALG Spor	Istanbul
14:00 TRT (UTC+3)	Karataş 21'; Bakarandze (yellow card) (yellow-red card) 68'; Rith 90'; Altıntaş (yellow card) 90+1'	Report 1 Report 2 Report 3	Olkhovik (yellow card) 79'	Stadium: Florya Metin Oktay Facilities; Referee: Berkay Ağış; Assistant referees: Aydın Baran Tek, Alperen Şeker; Fourth official: Mustafa Furkan Ceylan

== Statistics ==
=== Appearances and goals ===
No.	Pos	Nat	Player	Total		Super League	
No.	Pos	Nat	Player	Apps	Goals	Apps	Goals
Goalkeepers
1	GK	(Turkey) TUR	Gamze Nur Yaman	20	0	20	0
17	GK	(Turkey) TUR	Handan Kurğa	9	0	9	0
23	GK	(Turkey) TUR	Müge İnan	1	0	1	0
26	GK	(Turkey) TUR	Alanur Usta	0	0	0	0
Defenders
3	DF	(Turkey) TUR	Rabia Nur Küçük	21	0	21	0
5	DF	(Turkey) TUR	Eda Karataş	29	2	29	2
13	DF	(Turkey) TUR	Fatma Sare Öztürk	25	0	25	0
20	DF	(Turkey) TUR	Berna Yeniçeri	28	2	28	2
25	DF	(Ukraine) UKR	Lyubov Shmatko	27	2	27	2
Midfielders
8	MF	(Turkey) TUR	Emine Ecem Esen	25	2	25	2
10	MF	(Turkey) TUR	İsmigül Yalçıner	6	0	6	0
12	MF	(Turkey) TUR	Helin Erbulun	1	0	1	0
15	MF	(Nigeria) NGR	Chinaza Uchendu	5	0	5	0
18	MF	(Azerbaijan) AZE	Kristina Bakarandze	28	2	28	2
19	MF	(Turkey) TUR	Zehra Yılmaz	14	1	14	1
22	MF	(Turkey) TUR	Nazlıcan Parlak	6	0	6	0
24	MF	(Turkey) TUR	Arzu Akkurt	12	3	12	3
30	MF	(Turkey) TUR	Berra Pekgöz	1	0	1	0
38	MF	(Turkey) TUR	Arzu Karabulut	14	9	14	9
Forwards
7	FW	(Tunisia) TUN	Mariem Houij	12	2	12	2
9	FW	(Turkey) TUR	Elanur Laçin	28	8	28	8
11	FW	(Democratic Republic of the Congo) COD	Monique Rith	26	9	26	9
16	FW	(Turkey) TUR	Ebru Topçu	29	15	29	15
77	FW	(Albania) ALB	Megi Doçi	13	3	13	3
88	FW	(Zambia) ZAM	Siomala Mapepa	4	0	4	0
99	FW	(Turkey) TUR	Benan Altıntaş	26	2	26	2
Players transferred/loaned out during the season
21	MF	(Turkey) TUR	Didem Dülber	2	0	2	0
27	DF	(Democratic Republic of the Congo) COD	Naomie Kabakaba	15	6	15	6

Last updated: 5 May 2024.
Source: TFF.org

=== Goalscorers ===
Rank	No.	Pos	Nat	Name	Super League	Total
1	16	FW	(Turkey)	Ebru Topçu	15	15
2	11	FW	(Democratic Republic of the Congo)	Monique Rith	9	9
2	38	MF	(Turkey)	Arzu Karabulut	9	9
3	9	FW	(Turkey)	Elanur Laçın	8	8
4	27	DF	(Democratic Republic of the Congo)	Naomie Kabakaba	6	6
5	24	MF	(Turkey)	Arzu Akkurt	3	3
5	77	FW	(Albania)	Megi Doçi	3	3
6	5	DF	(Turkey)	Eda Karataş	2	2
6	7	FW	(Tunisia)	Mariem Houij	2	2
6	8	MF	(Turkey)	Emine Ecem Esen	2	2
6	18	MF	(Azerbaijan)	Kristina Bakarandze	2	2
6	20	DF	(Turkey)	Berna Yeniçeri	2	2
6	25	DF	(Ukraine)	Lyubov Shmatko	2	2
6	99	FW	(Turkey)	Benan Altıntaş	2	2
7	19	MF	(Turkey)	Zehra Yılmaz	1	1
Own goals					3	3
Totals					71	71

Last updated: 5 May 2024.
Source: TFF.org

=== Clean sheets ===
Rank	No.	Pos	Nat	Name	Super League	Total
1	1	GK	(Turkey)	Gamze Nur Yaman	8	8
2	17	GK	(Turkey)	Handan Kurğa	6	6
Totals					14	14

Last updated: 5 May 2024.
Source: TFF.org

=== Disciplinary records ===
No.	Pos	Nat	Name	Super League			Total		
No.	Pos	Nat	Name	Yellow card	(yellow card) (yellow-red card)	Red card	Yellow card	(yellow card) (yellow-red card)	Red card
3	DF	(Turkey)	Rabia Nur Küçük	2	0	0	2	0	0
5	DF	(Turkey)	Eda Karataş	5	0	0	5	0	0
7	FW	(Tunisia)	Mariem Houij	2	0	0	2	0	0
8	MF	(Turkey)	Emine Ecem Esen	4	0	0	4	0	0
9	FW	(Turkey)	Elanur Laçın	2	0	0	2	0	0
11	FW	(Democratic Republic of the Congo)	Monique Rith	3	0	0	3	0	0
13	DF	(Turkey)	Fatma Sare Öztürk	3	0	0	3	0	0
16	FW	(Turkey)	Ebru Topçu	1	0	0	1	0	0
17	GK	(Turkey)	Handan Kurğa	1	0	0	1	0	0
18	MF	(Azerbaijan)	Kristina Bakarandze	2	2	0	2	2	0
20	DF	(Turkey)	Berna Yeniçeri	5	0	0	5	0	0
25	DF	(Ukraine)	Lyubov Shmatko	8	0	0	8	0	0
27	DF	(Democratic Republic of the Congo)	Naomie Kabakaba	2	0	0	2	0	0
38	MF	(Turkey)	Arzu Karabulut	1	0	0	1	0	0
77	FW	(Albania)	Megi Doçi	1	1	0	1	1	0
99	FW	(Turkey)	Benan Altıntaş	2	0	0	2	0	0
Totals				44	3	0	44	3	0

Last updated: 5 May 2024.
Source: TFF.org

=== Game as captain ===
Rank	No.	Pos	Nat	Name	Super League	Total
1	8	MF	(Turkey)	Emine Ecem Esen	25	25
2	1	GK	(Turkey)	Gamze Nur Yaman	3	3
3	16	FW	(Turkey)	Ebru Topçu	2	2
Totals					30	30

Last updated: 5 May 2024.
Source: TFF.org
