= Zhala Mahsimova =

Azerbaijani footballer (born 1996)

Zhala Mahsimova Jalə Məhsimova
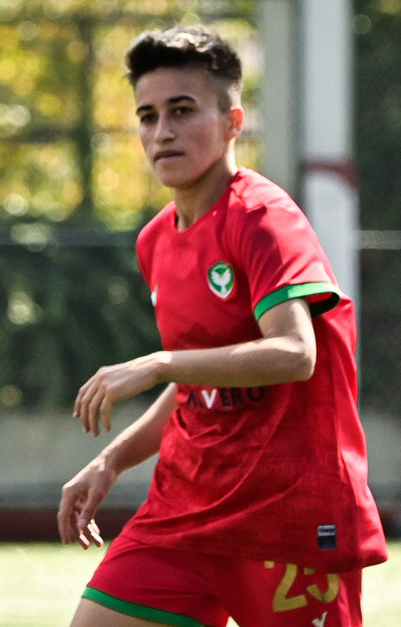

Personal information
- Date of birth: 2 September 1996 (age 30)
- Place of birth: Azerbaijan
- Height: 1.57 m (5 ft 2 in)
- Position: Midfielder

Team information
- Current team: Yüksekova
- Number: 20

Senior career*
Years	Team	Apps	(Gls)
2019	Torpedo Izhevsk	8	(0)
2020–2021	Zenit	1	(0)
2021–2022	ALG	14	(0)
2022–2023	Kdz. Ereğli	15	(1)
2023–2024	Amed	13	(0)
2024	Beylerbeyi	12	(0)
2025	Amed	8	(1)
2025–	Yüksekova	1	(0)

International career^{‡}
2011–2012	Azerbaijan U17	9	(0)
2013–2014	Azerbaijan U19	4	(0)
2019–	Azerbaijan	4	(0)
- * Club domestic league appearances and goals as of 5 October 2025 ‡ National team caps and goals as of 11 March 2020

Zhala Mahsimova (Azerbaijani: Jalə Məhsimova, born 2 September 1996), is an Azerbaijani footballer, who plays as a midfielder for Turkish Women's Football Super League club Yüksekova and the Azerbaijan women's national team.

== Club career ==
In November 2021, she moved to Turkey and joined the Gaziantep-based club ALG ALG. With ALG, she became the 2021-22 Women's Super League champion.

In the 2022-23 Women's Super League season, she transferred to Kdz. Ereğli.

The next season, she joined Aned in Diyarbakır, and played the first season half.

In the second half of the 2023-24 and the first half of the 2024-25 Super Leagueseason, she was with Beylerbeyi in Istanbul.

She returned to her former club Amed in second half of the 2024-25 Super League season.

In September 2025, she joined Yüksekova in Hakkari Province, which was promoted to the Turkish Super League.

== Honours ==
Turkish Women's Super League

ALG Spor
Winners (1): 2021-22

== See also ==
- List of Azerbaijan women's international footballers
