= Yüksekova S.K. =

Turkish women's football club

- Founded: 2017; 9 years ago
- Ground: Yüksekova Diistrict Stadium
- Chairman: Fevzi Yıldırım
- League: Super League
- 2024–25: Runners-up in First League

Yüksekova S.K. (Turkish: Yüksekova Spor Kulübü), formerly Yüksekova Belediyespor, is a Turkish women's football club based in Yüksekova District of Hakkari Province, southeastern Turkey. The team was promoted from the First League to the Super League to play in the 2025–26 season. Club president is Fevzi Yıldırım.

== History ==
Sponsopred by the District Municipality, Yüksekova S.K. was founded as the first women's football club at the district of Yüksekova in Hakkari Province under the name Yüksekova Belediyespor in the summer of 2017. They are the women's football side of the 1968-established same named club.

The team was formed in the beginning by 30 women footballers of age group 15–18. They played their first match with the neighboring Women's Second League-team Hakkarigücü Spor in a friendly game. They started to officially play in the 2018–19 Women's Third League, the lowest-level league of the women's football in Turkey after competing first in the 2018 Turkish Women's Football Championship. Yüksekova became leader of the Group D in the 2023–24 Women's Second League and ranked as runners-up after play-offs. They were promoted to the Women's First League for the next season. The Ministry of Family and Social Services donated a bus to the club for their long distance away match travels. The team finished the 2024–25 Women's First League season's Group B as leader and the play-offs as runners-up, and was promoted to the Women's Super League.

== Stadium ==
The team play their home matches at Yüksekova İlçe Stadı (Yüksekova District Stadium), which has artificial turf ground.

== Statistics ==
As of 4 October 2025

Season	League	Rank	Pld	W	D	L	GF	GA	GD	Pts
2018–19	Third League Gr. 15	5	3	0	7	13	41	-28	3	
2019–20	Second League Gr. 9	2	9	6	1	2	16	7	+9	19
2021–22	Second League Gr. A	5	10	1	1	8	5	32	-27	4
2022–23	Second League Gr. A	5	10	2	0	8	6	27	-21	6
2023–24	Second League Gr. D	1	14	11	1	2	64	13	51	34
2023–24	Play-offs	2	3	1	1	1	12	8	+4	4
2024–25	First League Gr. B	1	14	13	1	0	58	1	+57	40
2024–25	Play-offs	2	6	2	3	1	5	3	+2	29
2025–26	Super League	12	3 (^{1})	0	2	1	2	4	-2	2
Green marks a season followed by promotion, red a season followed by relegation.

- (^{1}): Season in progress

== Current squad ==
As of 4 October 2025

- Head coach:

Note: Flags indicate national team as defined under FIFA eligibility rules; some limited exceptions apply. Players may hold more than one non-FIFA nationality.

No.	Pos.	Nation	Player
16	GK	TUN	Salima Jobrani
66	GK	AZE	Aytaj Sharifova
3	DF	TUR	Beyza Kocatürk
4	DF	TUR	Merve Odabaşoğlu
6	DF	TUR	Emine Demir
91	DF	TUR	Güzide Alçu
99	DF	TUR	Derya Arhan
9	MF	TUR	Diyan Ceyhan
10	MF	GEO	Maiko Bebia
17	MF	AZE	Sevinj Jafarzade
19	MF	GHA	Suzzy Teye

No.	Pos.	Nation	Player
20	MF	AZE	Zhala Mahsimova
24	MF	TUR	Ayşe Sert
65	MF	TUR	Sinem Basak
72	MF	TUR	Dilan Aslan
77	MF	AZE	Vusala Hajiyeva
7	FW	TUN	Mariem Houij
8	FW	CMR	Suzie Mbiandji
23	FW	TUR	Nursel Özkan
33	FW	RSA	Letago Madiba
13		TUR	Ayşe Akbalık

== Former notable players ==
- (South Africa) Rachel Sebati (2024–25)

== Honours ==
Women's First League
Runners-up (1): 2024–25

Women's Second League
Runners-up (1): 2023–24

== See also ==
- Hakkarigücü Spor, neighboring women's football club
