= Anasthesia Achiaa =

Ghanaian footballer (born 2003)

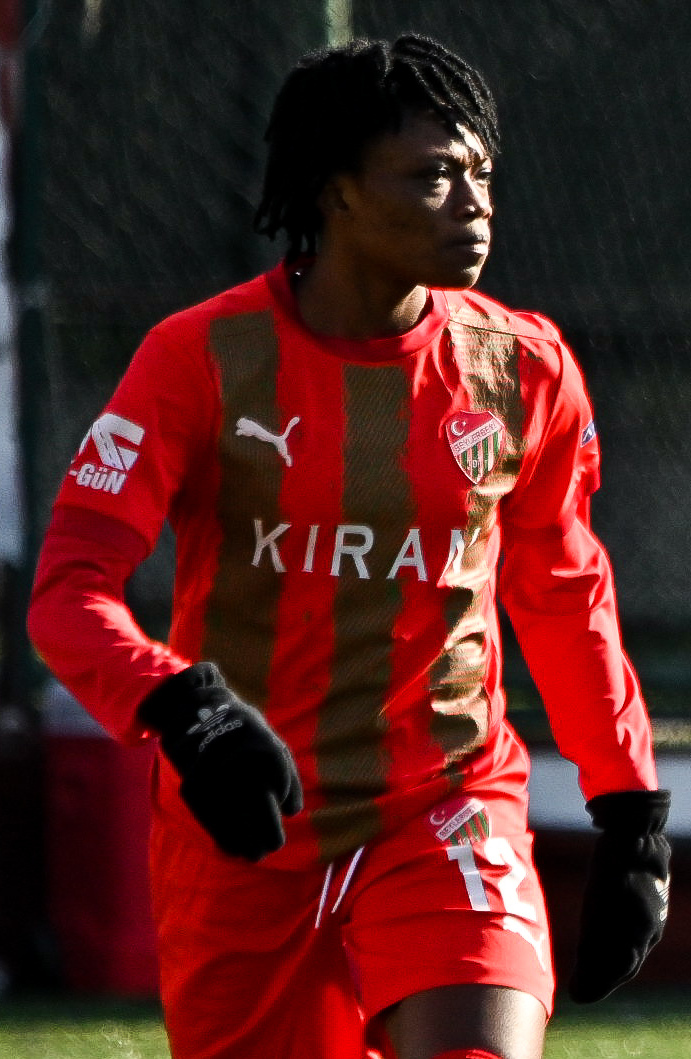
- Achiaa with Beylerbeyi in 2023

Personal information
- Date of birth: 20 December 2003 (age 22)
- Height: 1.56 m (5 ft 1 in)
- Position: Defender

Team information
- Current team: Beylerbeyi
- Number: 21

Senior career*
Years	Team	Apps	(Gls)
- Beylerbeyi

International career
- Ghana U17
- Ghana U20
- Ghana
- * Club domestic league appearances and goals

Anasthesia Achiaa (born 20 December 2003) is a Ghanaian professional footballer who plays as a defender for Turkish Women's Super League club Beylerbeyi and the Ghana women's national team.

== Club Football ==
In Ghana, Achiaa played for Sea Lions Football Club as a defender from 2019 to 2020. She joined fellow Ghanaian side Ampem Darkoa Ladies in 2020. She currently plays for Turkish club Beylerbeyi Kadin Futbol.
