= Holly O'Neill =

Canadiian soccer player (born 1998)

Personal information
- Full name: Holly Taylor O'Neill
- Date of birth: September 19, 1998 (age 28)
- Place of birth: St. John's, Newfoundland, Canada
- Height: 5 ft 10 in (1.78 m)
- Position: Forward

Team information
- Current team: JEF United
- Number: 11

College career
Years	Team	Apps	(Gls)
- Memorial Sea-Hawks

Senior career*
Years	Team	Apps	(Gls)
2022	Electric City FC	18	(9)
2023	ÍBV	13	(4)
2023	Racing Power FC	2	(0)
2024	Beylerbeyi	9	(4)
2024	Simcoe County Rovers FC	11	(4)
2024–2025	JEF United		
2025	FK TransINVEST	9	(3)
2026–	Guangxi Pingguo Beinong FC	0	(0)
- * Club domestic league appearances and goals

Holly Taylor O'Neill (born September 19, 1998) is a Canadian women's soccer forward who plays for Guangxi Pingguo Beinong FC in the Chinese Women's Super League.

== Early life and education ==
Holly Taylor O'Neill was born on September 19, 1998. She is a native of St. John's, NL, Canada.

She completed her secondary education at the local Gonzaga High School. She then studied at Memorial University in her hometown majoring in science.

== Club career ==
O'Neill is 5 ft 10 in (1.78 m) tall. She plays in the forward position.

During her university years, she played for the college soccer team Memorial Sea-Hawks.

She played in 2023 for ÍBV from Vestmannaeyjar in the Icelandic league Úrvalsdeild kvenna. She netted four goals in 13 games. She appeared also in two matches at the Icelandic Women's Football Cup.

In March 2024, she moved to Turkey, and joined the Istanbul-based club Beylerbeyi to play in the second half of the 2023-24 Super League season. After scoring four goals in nine marches played, she left Turkey.

For the 2024–25 season, she transferred to JEF United in Ichihara, Chiba, Japan to play in the WE League.
