= Safa Merve Nalçacı =

Turkish footballer and skateboarder (born 1993)

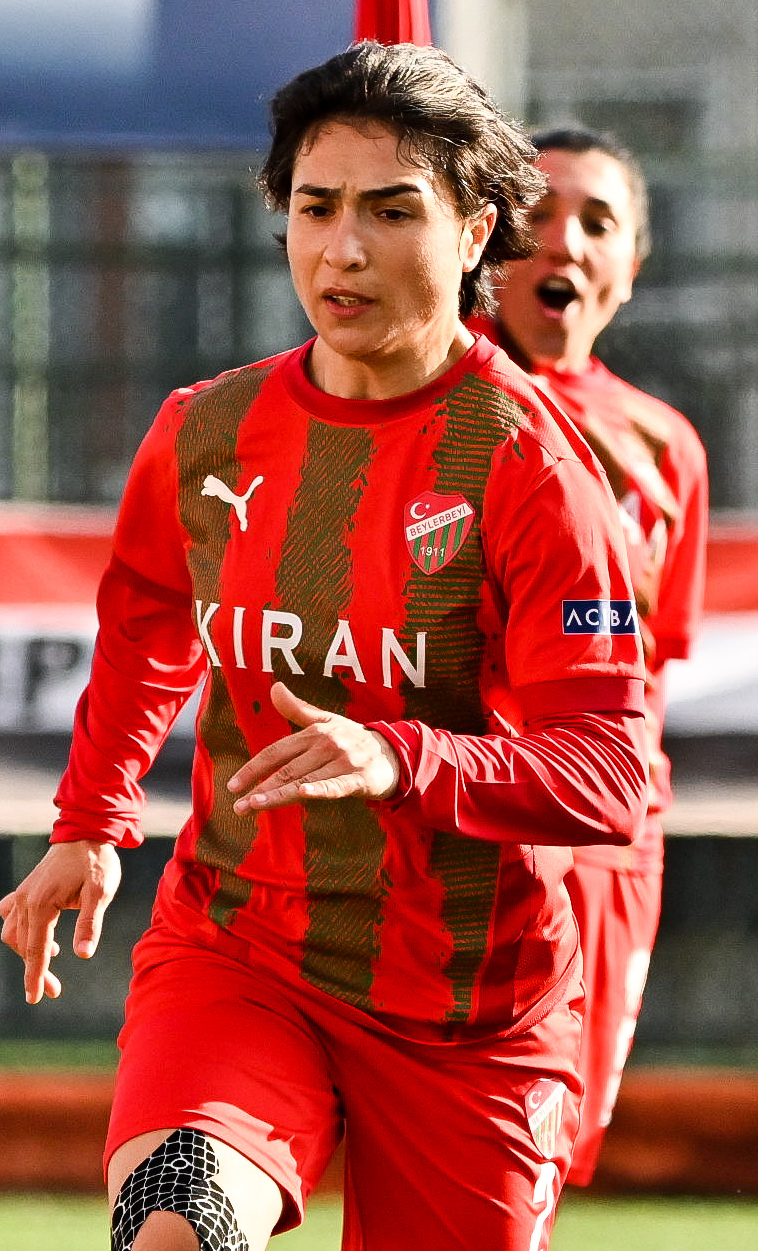
- Safa Merve Nalçacı for Beylerbeyi in the 2023–24 season.

Personal information
- Date of birth: 28 July 1993 (age 33)
- Place of birth: Ankara, Turkey
- Position: Defender

Team information
- Current team: Beylerbeyi
- Number: 2

Senior career*
Years	Team	Apps	(Gls)
2008–2012	Karşıyaka BESEM Spor	33	(15)
2012–2013	Çamlıcaspor	18	(0)
2014	Karşıyaka Koleji Spor	7	(0)
2014–2017	Beşiktaş	58	(2)
2017–2018	Fatih Vatan	17	(0)
2018	Ataşehir Belediyespor	0	(0)
2018–2019	Fatih Vatan	10	(0)
2019–2021	Kireçburnu Spor	16	(0)
2021–2022	Fenerbahçe	17	(0)
2022–2023	Pendik Çamlıkspor	9	(3)
2023–	Beylerbeyi	10	(0)
Total		195	(20)

International career^{‡}
2016	Turkey	1	(0)
- * Club domestic league appearances and goals as of 25 November 2023 ‡ National team caps and goals as of 2 June 2016

Safa Merve Nalçacı (born 28 July 1993) is a Turkish former women's football defender. She was part of the Turkey women's national team. After ending her football career, she became a skateboarder. She represents Turkey in women's street event at international competitions.

== Personal life life ==
Safa Merve Nalçcacı was born in Ankara, Turkey on 28 July 1993. Her birth place is officially given as Van, eastern Turkey due to her family's registration. Her father was a school teacher. The family had to relocate through the country and abroad due to his appointments. She lived in Germany awhile, and then returned to Turkey to move to İzmir. She settled in Istanbul with her family when her father, after retirement, entered a car wash business with his brother.

== Club career ==
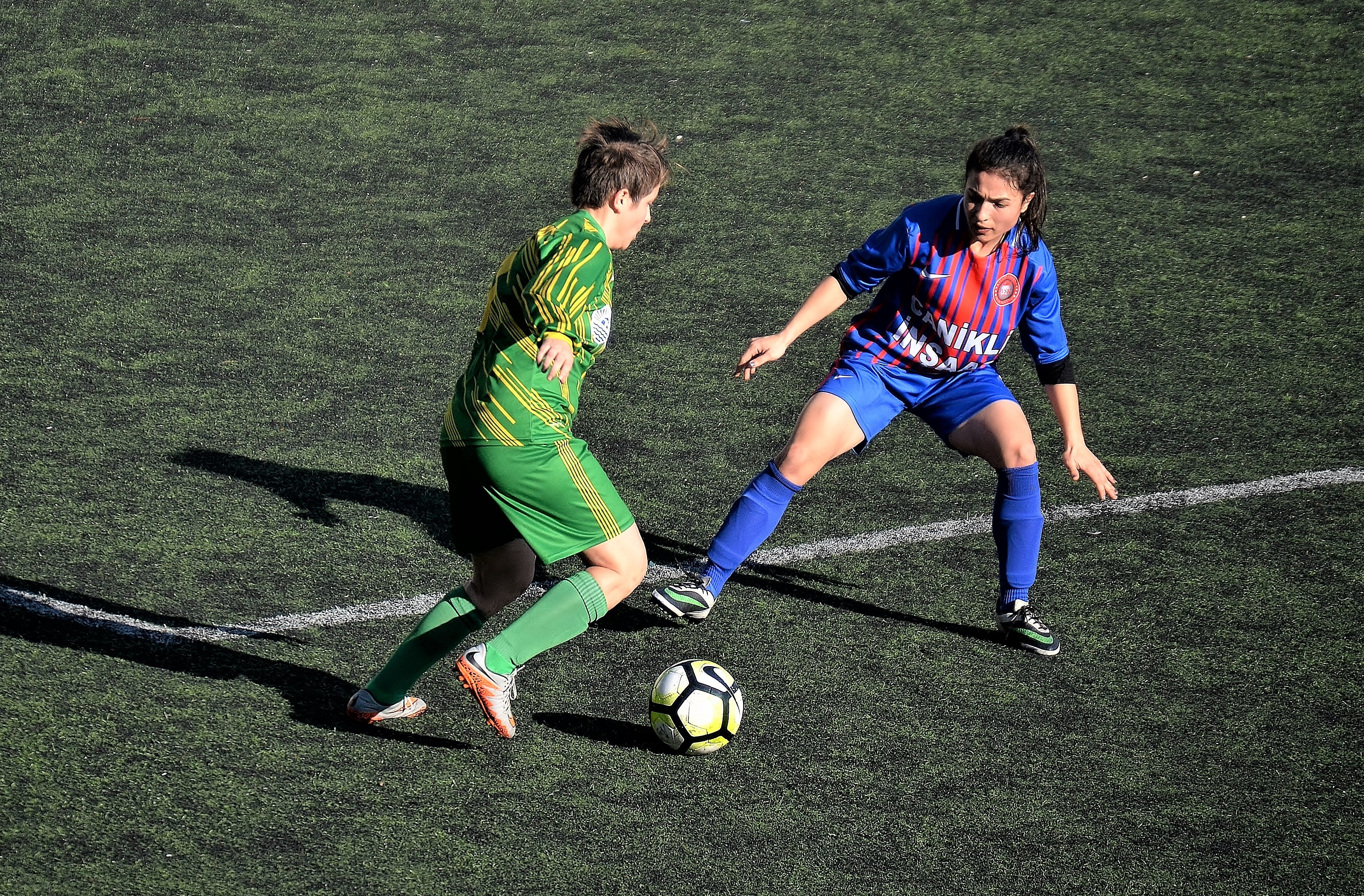
Safa Merve Nalçacı (right) for Fatih Vatan defending an attack of Kireçburnu Spor in the 2017–18 season.

Nalçacı obtained her license from Karşıyaka BESEM Spor in İzmir on 16 November 2007. She then played in the team between 2008 and 2012. During this time, she appeared in the Women's Regional and Second League, scoring 15 goals in 33 matches. In the 2012–13 season, she transferred to the Istanbul-based club Çamlıcaspor to play in the Women's First League. After playing 18 matches, she moved to Karşıyaka Koleji Spor in İzmit in the second half of the 2013–14 Second League season. The next season, she joined the new established team Beşiktaş in Istanbul, which played in the Third League. At the end of that season, she enjoyed her team's promotion to the Second League, and after one season to the First League. She capped in 58 matches and scored two goals in three seasons with Beşiktaş J.K. For the 2017–18 First League season, she went to the newly promoted Fatih Vatan, where she played 17 matches.

In July 2018, Nalçacı joined the league champion Ataşehir Belediyespor before the 2018–19 UEFA Women's Champions League qualifying round. She played in all three matches of the qualifying round. In October 2018, she returned to Fatih Vatan Spor for the 2018–19 Women's First League season. The next season, she moved to Kireçburnu Spor.

In the 2021–22 Super League season, she was with Fenerbahçe The next season, she transferred to Pendik Çamlıkspor in the First League, which was promoted to the Sıper League at the end of the season, and was renamed to Beylerbeyi S.K. in the 2023–24 Super League season. She ended her football career after the end of the league season.

== International career ==
Nalçacı was admitted to the Turkey women's national football team, debuting in the UEFA Women's Euro 2017 qualifying Group 5 match against Russia on 2 June 2016.

== Career statistics ==
As of match played 25 November 2023.

Club	Season	League			Continental		National		Total												
Club	Season	Division	Apps	Goals	Apps	Goals	Apps	Goals	Apps	Goals											
Karşıyaka BESEM Spor	2008–09	Second League	8	0	–	–	0	0	8	0											
Karşıyaka BESEM Spor	2009–10	Regional League	8	0	–	–	0	0	8	0											
Karşıyaka BESEM Spor	2010–11	Regional League	9	12	–	–	0	0	9	12											
Karşıyaka BESEM Spor	2011–12	Second League	8	3	–	–	0	0	8	3											
Karşıyaka BESEM Spor	Total		33	15	–	–	0	0	33	15	Çamlıcaspor	2012–13	First League	18	0	–	–	0	0	18	0
Karşıyaka Koleji Spor	2013–14	Second League	7	0	–	–	0	0	7	0											
Beşiktaş	2014–15	Third League	16	1	–	–	0	0	16	1											
Beşiktaş	2015–16	Second League	19	1	–	–	1	0	20	1											
Beşiktaş	2016–17	First League	23	0	–	–	0	0	23	0											
Beşiktaş	Total		58	2	–	–	1	0	59	2											
Fatih Vatan	2017–18	First League	17	0	–	–	0	0	17	0											
Ataşehir Belediyespor	2018–19	First League	0	0	3	0	0	0	3	0											
Fatih Vatan	2018–19	First League	10	0	–	–	0	0	10	0											
Kireçburnu Spor	2019–20	First League	13	0	–	–	0	0	13	0											
Kireçburnu Spor	2020–21	First League	3	0	–	–	0	0	3	0											
Kireçburnu Spor	Total		16	0	–	–	0	0	16	0											
Fenerbahçe	2021–22	Super League	17	0	–	–	0	0	17	0											
Pendik Çamlıkspor	2022–23	First League	9	3	–	–	0	0	9	3											
Beylerbeyi	2023–24	Super League	10	3	–	–	0	0	10	0											
Career total			195	20	3	0	1	0	199	20											

== Skateboarding career ==
Nalçacı learned to skateboard at the age of four when she was living in Germany with her family. She kept her skateboard, however, she was focused on football playing professionally, and skateboarded as hobby. Her football club Beşiktaş forbade her skateboarding four years long due to the risk of injury. She continued skateboarding secretly after training sessions. Her football club Fenerbahçe allowed her officially because, by this time, she became part of the national skateboarding team. After leaving football, she fully devoted herself to skateboarding, competing in women's street event. She represented Turkey at the 2026 Mediterranean Ganes in Taranto, Italy.

== Honours ==
Turkish Women's First Football League

Beşiktaş
Runners-up (1): 2016–17

Pendik Çamlıkspor
Winners (1): 2022–23

Turkish Women's Second Football League

Beşiktaş J.K.
Winners (1): 2015–16

Turkish Women's Third Football League

Beşiktaş J.K.
Winners (1): 2014–15

Turkish Women's Regional Football League

Karşıyaka BESEM Spor
Runners-up (2): 2009–10, 2010–11
