= Letago Madiba =

South African soccer player (born 1991)

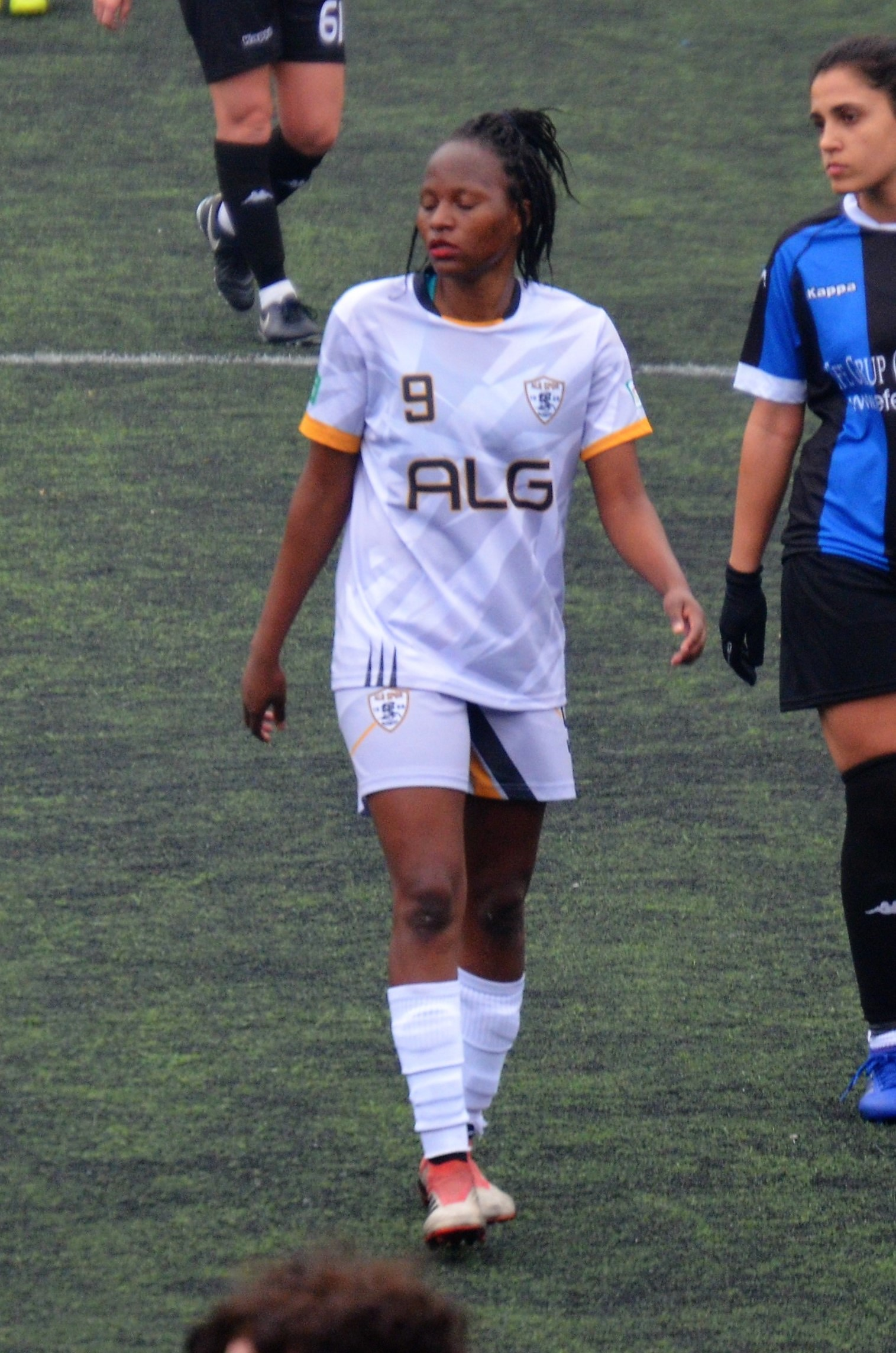
- Letago of ALG in the 2019–20 Turkish Women's First League.

Personal information
- Date of birth: 15 July 1991 (age 35)
- Place of birth: Arthur's Seat, Bushbuckridge, Mpumalanga, South Africa
- Position: Forward

Team information
- Current team: Yüksekova
- Number: 33

Senior career*
Years	Team	Apps	(Gls)
2016–2018	TUT Ladies	54	(82)
2019	Minsk	4	(2)
2019–2020	ALG	14	(11)
2020–2023	Fatih Vatan	46	(11)
2023	Kireçburnu	6	(8)
2024	Telsiz	1	(0)
2024–	Yüksekova	18	(11)

International career
2014–2019	South Africa		
- * Club domestic league appearances and goals as of 5 October 2025

Letago Madiba (born 15 July 1991) is a South African soccer player who plays as a forward for Yüksekova in the Turkish Women's Super League. She has been a member of the South Africa women's national team.

== Personal life ==
Letago Madiba was born at Arthur's Seat of Bushbuckridge town in Mpumalanga Province, South Africa on 15 July 1991, into a family with four elder brothers.

She graduated from Lekete High School in Arthur's Seat, Bushbuckridge, and holds a BTech degree in Sport and Exercise science from Tshwane University of Technology. She graduated with a Master's degree in Organisational leadership in 2021.

== Early career ==
Madiba started playing football already at the age of five in the streets of Arthur's Seat. Her brother Karabo, who would become a professional footballer, taught her the basics and skills. From a young age, she played with boys in the community, and became the only female football player in school.

== Club career ==
In her early career, she was a defender. She played for the South African Tshwane University of Technology's team TUT Ladies in the SAFA Sasol Women's League. She capped for South Africa 54 times in the 2016–17 and 2017–18 seasons, scoring a total of 82 goals. In addition, she netted 31 goals in various tournaments for the university team. Overall, she appeared in 75 games in the Sasol League, and scored a total of 103 goals, winning the championship in 2017–18. She won also the University Sports South Africa (USSA) Football National Club Championship and the ABSA Women's Championship.

In 2018, although she decided to retire from football to seek permanent employment, her team coach Tebogo Mokae convinced her to finish the season. In February 2019, she got a chance to go to Spain, where she trained for a month with two clubs, which helped renew her confidence in a football career.

The assistant coach of TUT Ladies, Nadia Kroll, offered her a contract to play in Belarus. Madiba had to decide within three days, as the Belarusian club was in preparation for a major European tournament. Her childhood dream of playing overseas came through when she took that chance. In July 2019, she moved to Belarus, and joined ZFK Minsk two weeks before their participation at the 2019–20 UEFA Women's Champions League qualifying round. She played in two of the three qualification matches, and scored one goal.

Arranged by her manager Kroll, she went to Turkey in October 2019, and signed a contract to play as a forward with ALG Spor, a club in Gaziantep, who had just been promoted to the Women's First League at the end of the 2017–18 season. She scored eleven goals in 14 matches of the 2019-20 Turkish Women's First Football League season, before it was discontinued due to the COVID-19 pandemic in Turkey. Her team was entitled to represent Turkey at the 2020–21 UEFA Women's Champions League, as the top-ranking team, when the league was stopped.

In the 2020–21 Turkcell Women's League, she transferred to Fatih Vatan in Istanbul.

In October 2024, she joined the Turkish First League club Yüksekova in Hakkari Province. Her team was promoted to Turkish Super League after the play-offs.

== International career ==
In April 2014, Madiba was admitted to the South Africa women's national team, nicknamed "Banyana Banyana", to play in a friendly match against Zimbabwe, During a national team camp just before the 2014 African Women's Championship, she tore her ACL, LCL, and meniscus. She underwent two surgeries, knocking her out of action for 14 months.

She was called up to the national team for the 2017 COSAFA Women's Championship – Group C matches, but only played in a handful of matches.

== Career statistics ==
As of 5 October 2025

Club	Season	League			Continental		National		Total	
Club	Season	Division	Apps	Goals	Apps	Goals	Apps	Goals	Apps	Goals
ALG	2019–20	First League	14	11	–	–	0	0	14	11
ALG	Total		14	11	–	–	0	0	14	11
Fatih Vatan	2020–21	First League	6	1	–	–	0	0	6	1
Fatih Vatan	2021–22	Super League	22	8	–	–	0	0	22	8
Fatih Vatan	2022–23	Super League	18	2	–	–	0	0	18	2
Fatih Vatan	Total		46	11	–	–	0	0	46	11
Kireçburnu	2023–24	First League	6	8	-	-	0	0	6	8
Telsiz	2023–24	First League	1	0	-	-	0	0	1	0
Yüksekova	2024–25	First League	15	11	-	-	0	0	15	11
Yüksekova	2025–26	Super League	3	0	-	-	0	0	3	0
Yüksekova	Total		18	11	–	–	0	0	18	11

== Honours ==
ZFK Minsk

Belarusian Premier League
2019
Belarusian Women's Cup
2019

Turkish Women's Football First League

Fatih Vatan
Runners-up (1): 2020–21

Yüksekova
Third places (1): 2024-25
