= Derya Arhan =

Turkish footballer (born 1999)

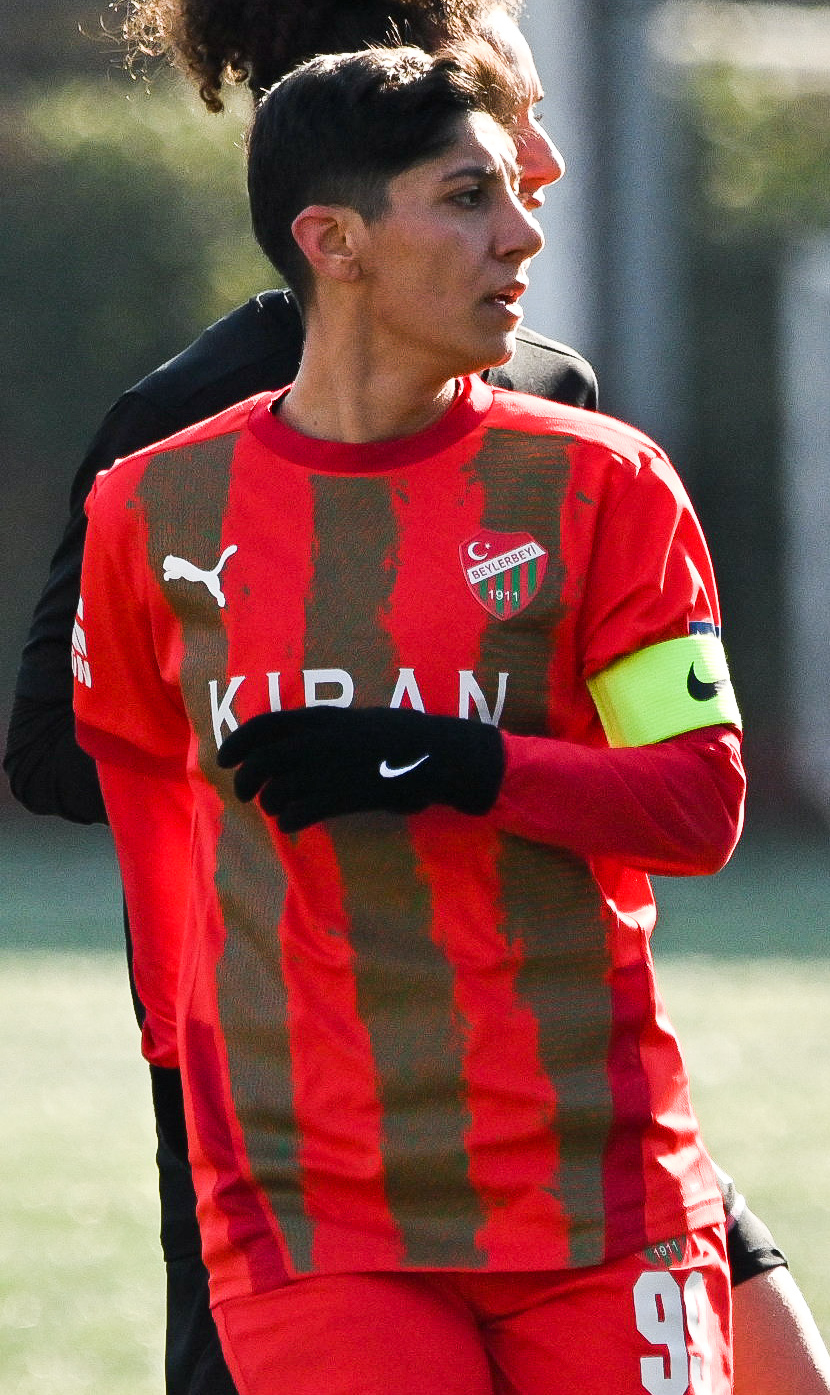
- Arhan with Beylerbeyi in 2024

Personal information
- Date of birth: January 25, 1999 (age 27)
- Place of birth: Bayrampaşa, Istanbul, Turkey
- Position: Defender

Team information
- Current team: Pogoń Szczecin
- Number: 99

Senior career*
Years	Team	Apps	(Gls)
2013–2018	Kdz. Ereğlispor	80	(16)
2018–2019	Beşiktaş	17	(1)
2019	Santa Teresa	2	(0)
2019–2021	ALG Spor	21	(6)
2021	Zhytlobud-2	1	(0)
2021	ALG	1	(0)
2021–2022	Fatih Karagümrük	20	(5)
2022–2023	Galatasaray	22	(1)
2023–2024	Beylerbeyi	13	(9)
2024–2025	Fenerbahçe	28	(1)
2025–2026	Yüksekova	21	(1)
2026	Neftçi	0	(0)
2026–	Pogoń Szczecin	0	(0)

International career^{‡}
2013	Turkey U15	2	(1)
2014–2015	Turkey U17	18	(2)
2015–2018	Turkey U19	24	(2)
2018–	Turkey	19	(3)
- * Club domestic league appearances and goals as of 19:18, 31 July 2026 (UTC) ‡ National team caps and goals as of 12 July 2024

Derya Arhan (born January 25, 1999) is a Turkish professional footballer who plays as a defender for Ekstraliga club Pogoń Szczecin. She is a member of the Turkey women's national team. She was part of the Turkey national women's U-15, women's U-17 and women's U-19 teams.

== Club career ==
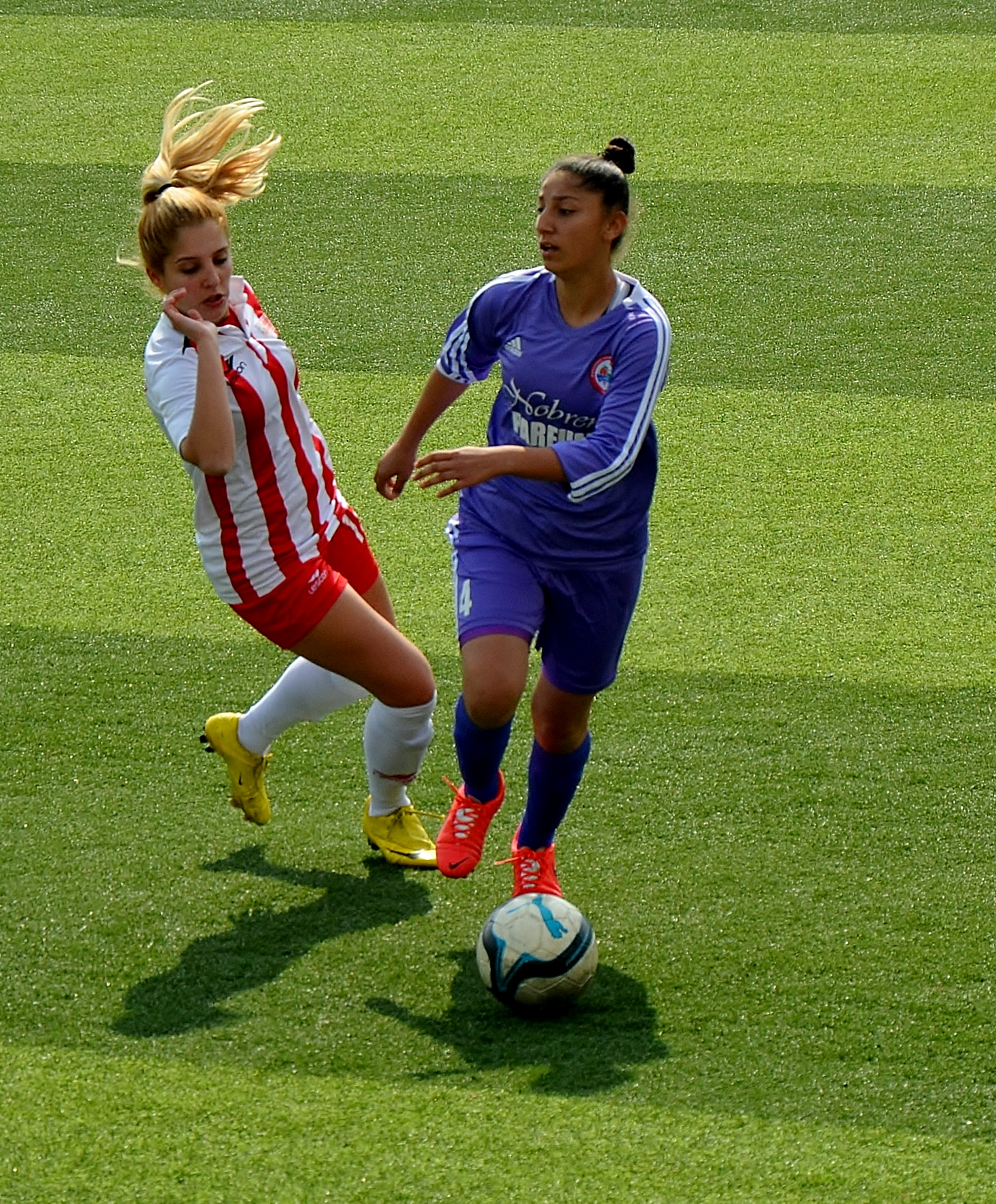
Arhan (right) playing for Kdz. Ereğlispor in the 2014–15 season's away match against Ataşehir Belediyespor

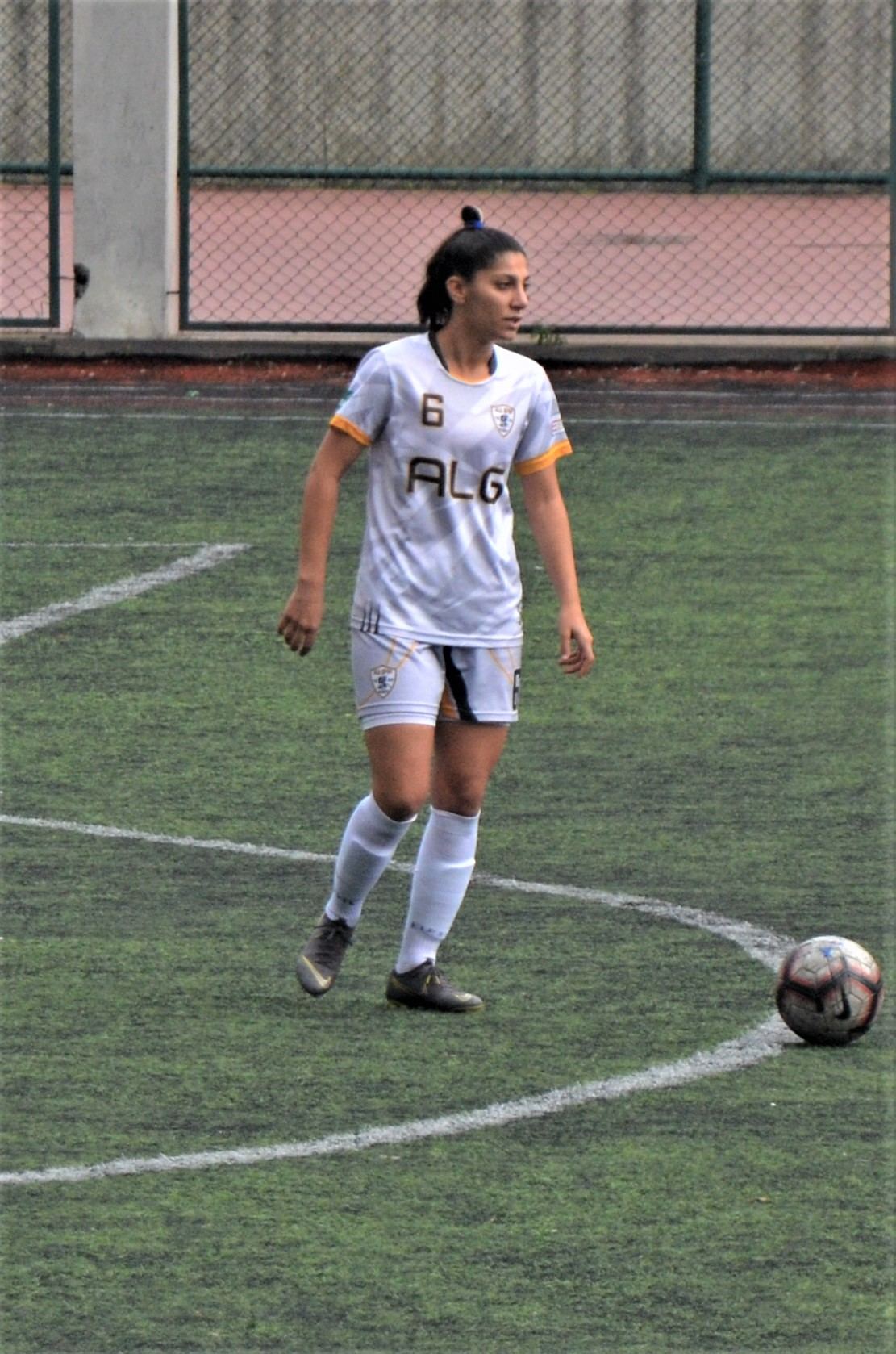
Arhan with ALG in the 2019–20 Women's First League season

Derya Arhan was registered to her first youth club, the Küçükyalı, Istanbul-based Sosyal Hizmetler Gençlik ve Spor, on 25 May 2011.

=== Kdz. Ereğli ===
On 22 November 2012, she transferred to Kdz. Ereğlispor, and played in their newly established youth team for girls. She enjoyed Turkish Girls' Football Championship with her team in September 2013. Beginning with the 2013–14 season, she started playing in the senior team in the Turkish Women's First League.

=== Beşiktaş ===
She moved to Beşiktaş for the 2018–19 League season. She won the league title with the club the 2018–19 season.

By July 2019, Arhan was transferred by the Spanish club Santa Teresa CD in Badajoz, playing in the Primera División B.

=== ALG ===
By October 2019, she returned home and signed with the Gaziantep-based club ALG Spor. She debuted in the UEFA Women's Champions League in a 2020–21 UEFA Women's Champions League qualifying match against Albanian team KFF Vllaznia Shkodër in Shkodër, Albania on 3 November 2020, and scored a goal.

=== Zhytlobud-2 ===
On 22 March 2021, she moved to Ukraine and joined Ukrainian Women's League club Zhytlobud-2.

=== Return to ALG ===
After returning home, she rejoined her club ALG Spor. She appeared for ALG Spor only in the first match of the 2021–22 Women's Super League season.

=== Fatih Karagümrük ===
For the 2021–22 Women's Super League season, she moved to the newly established Fatih Karagümrük.

=== Galatasaray ===
On 9 August 2022, Arhan moved to fellow Turkish Super League club Galatasaray.

=== Beylerbeyi ===
In August 2023, she signed for newly promoted top-tier side Beylerbeyi.

=== Fenerbahçe ===
Ahead of the 2024–25 Super League season, Arhan moved to Fenerbahçe.

=== Yükeskova ===
After one season, she transferred to the Hakkari-based club Yüksekova, which was recently promoted to the top division.

=== Neftçi & Pogoń Szczecin ===
Arhan moved to Azerbaijani club Neftçi in the summer of 2026, where she appeared in two UEFA Women's Champions League qualifying matches. On 30 July 2026, she moved to Polish club Pogoń Szczecin on a one-year deal, with an option for another year.

== International career ==
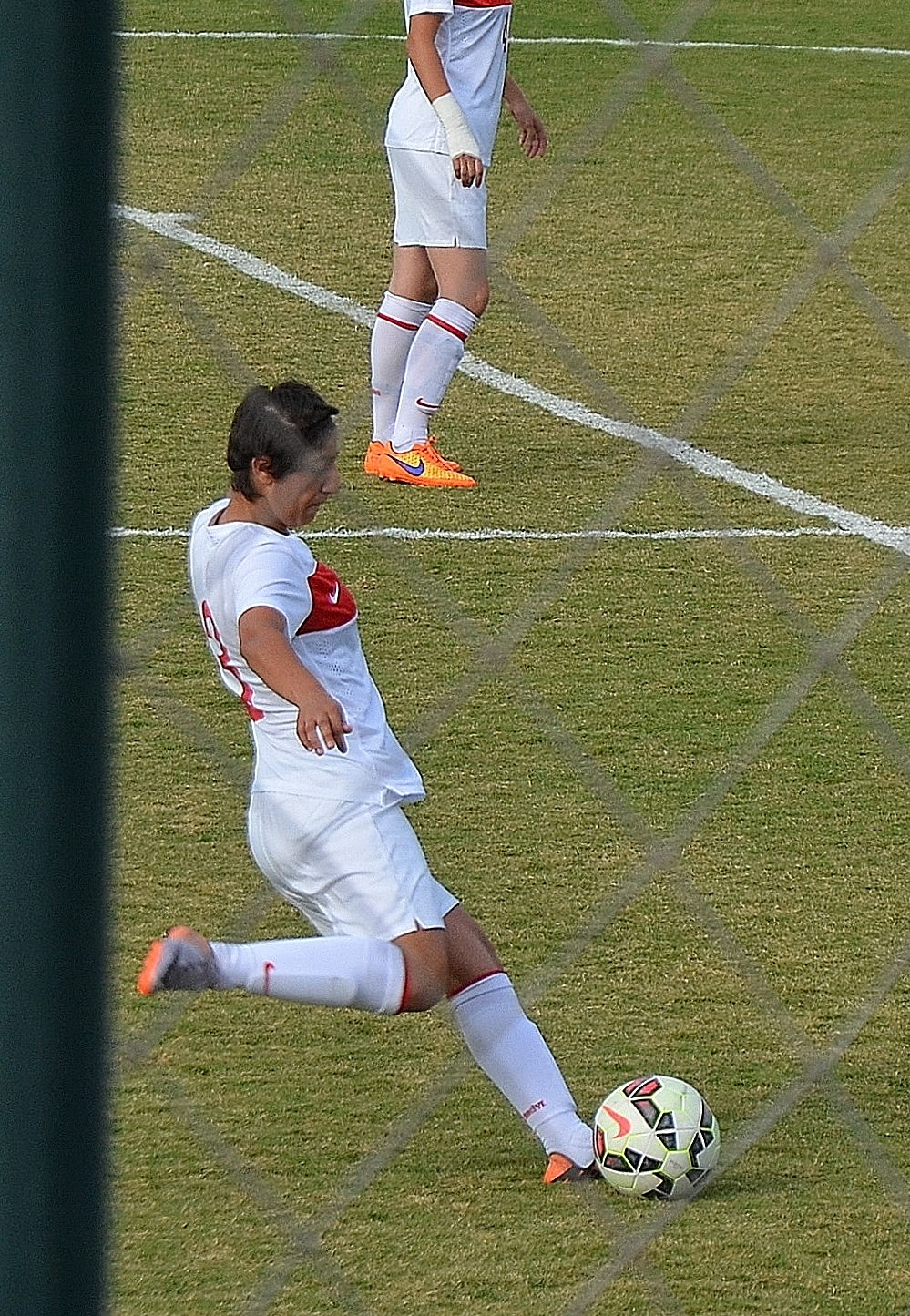
Arhan playing for the Turkey national under-17 team

=== Turkey U17 ===
She was called up to the Turkey women's national under-15 team, and debuted in the friendly match against Azerbaijan on 2 October 2013. She capped twice and scored one goal for the Turkey U15 team.

Arhan played her first game for the Turkey U17 team in a friendly against Greece on 2 March 2014. She later took part in the 2014 UEFA Development Tournament and 2015 UEFA Women's Under-17 Championship qualification matches.

=== Turkey U19 ===
Between 2015 and 2018, Arhan played for the national under-19 team. She was part of the team that won the 2016 UEFA Development Tournament. She played in two matches of the 2017 UEFA Women's Under-19 Championship qualification, all games of the Elite round, and the 2018 UEFA Women's Under-19 Championship qualification. She scored two goals in 24 matches for the under-19s.

=== Turkey ===
On 8 November 2018, Arhan debuted in the senior team in a friendly match against Georgia.

== Career statistics ==
=== Club ===
As of 5 October 2025

Appearances and goals by club, season and competition
Club	Season	League			National cup (Note: Includes Turkish Women's Cup)		Continental		Total	
Club	Season	Division	Apps	Goals	Apps	Goals	Apps	Goals	Apps	Goals
Kdz. Ereğli	2013–14	Turkish First League	8	0	7	1	—		15	1
Kdz. Ereğli	2014–15	Turkish First League	17	2	10	2	—		27	4
Kdz. Ereğli	2015–16	Turkish First League	18	7	8	0	—		26	7
Kdz. Ereğli	2016–17	Turkish First League	22	4	7	0	—		29	4
Kdz. Ereğli	2017–18	Turkish First League	15	3	12	2	—		27	5
Kdz. Ereğli	Total		80	16	44	5	—		124	21
Beşiktaş	2018–19	Turkish First League	17	1	4	1	—		21	2
Santa Teresa	2019–20	Primera Div. B	2	0	0	0	—		2	0
ALG	2019–20	Turkish First League	15	5	1	0	—		16	5
ALG	2020–21	Turkish First League	6	1	4	2	1 (Note: Appearance in UEFA Women's Champions League)	1	11	4
ALG	Total		21	6	5	2	1	1	27	9
Zhytlobud-2	2021–22	Ukrainian Higher League	1	0	0	0	—		1	0
ALG	2021–22	Turkish Super League	1	0	0	0	—		1	0
Fatih Karagümrük	2021–22	Turkish Super League	20	5	5	0	—		25	5
Galatasaray	2022–23	Turkish Super League	22	1	0	0	—		22	1
Beylerbeyi	2023–24	Turkish Super League	13	9	4	0	—		17	9
Fenerbahçe	2024–25	Turkish Super League	28	1	1	0	—		29	1
Yüksekova	2025–26	Turkish Super League	3	0	0	0	—		3	0
Career total			208	39	63	8	1	1	272	48

=== International ===
Scores and results list Turkey's goal tally first, score column indicates score after each Arhan goal.

List of international goals scored by Derya Arhan
No.	Date	Venue	Opponent	Score	Result	Competition	Ref
1	27 October 2020	Sapsan Arena, Moscow, Russia	Russia	1–4	2–4	UEFA Women's Euro 2022 qualifying	
2	1 December 2020	Arslan Zeki Demirci Sports Complex, Antalya, Turkey	Russia	1–2	1–2	UEFA Women's Euro 2022 qualifying	

== Honours ==
Beşiktaş

- Turkish First League: 2018–19

ALG

- Turkish First League: 2019–20

Turkey U19

- UEFA Women's Under-19 Development Tournament: 2016
