= Madinatou Rouamba =

Burkinabé footballer (born 2001)

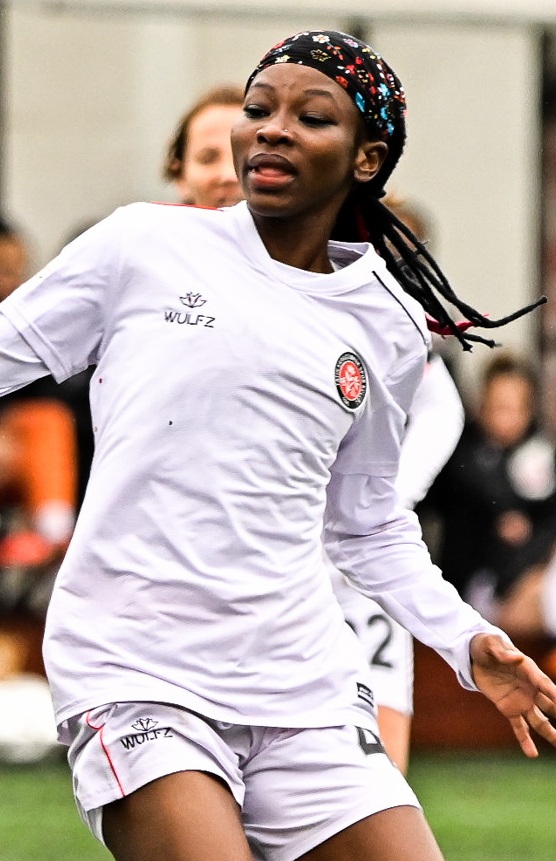

Personal information
- Date of birth: 1 December 2001 (age 24)
- Place of birth: Ouagadougou, Burkina Faso
- Height: 1.73 m (5 ft 8 in)
- Position: Defender

Team information
- Current team: Beylerbeyi
- Number: 14

Senior career*
Years	Team	Apps	(Gls)
- Etincelles de Ouagadougou
2022–2024	Fatih Karagümrük	44	(1)
2024–	Beylerbeyi	3	(0)

International career
	Burkina Faso	14	(1)
- * Club domestic league appearances and goals as of 22 September 2024

Madinatou Rouamba (born 1 December 2001) is a Burkinabè professional women's football defender who plays in the Turkish Super League for Beylerbeyi in Istanbul. She is a member of the Burkina Faso women's national team.

== Club career ==
Madinatou Rouamba is 1.73 m (5 ft 8 in) tall, and plays in the defender position.

She played for her hometown club "Etincelles de Ouagadougou".

In August 2022, Rouamba moved to Turkey, and signed a one-year contract n with the Istanbul-based club Fatih Karagümrük to play in the 2022–23 Women's Super League.

In the 2024–25 Super League season, she transferred to Beylerbeyi.

== International career ==
Rouamba took part at the 2022 Women's Africa Cup of Nations qualification held in Morocco. She capped 14 times for the Burkina Faso women's national football team and scored one goal.
