= Güzide Alçu =

Turkish footballer (born 1997)

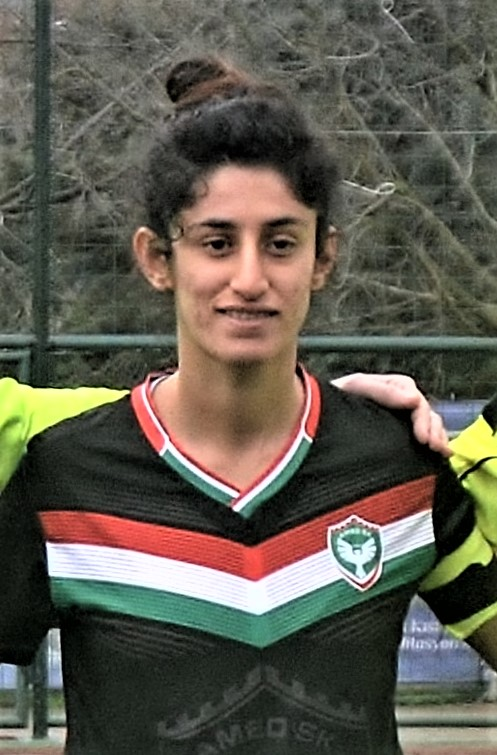
- Güzide Alçu of Amed in February 2018

Personal information
- Date of birth: 5 July 1997 (age 29)
- Place of birth: Diyarbakır, Turkey

Team information
- Current team: Yüksekova
- Number: 91

Senior career*
Years	Team	Apps	(Gls)
2011–2024	Amed	187	(131)
2024	Neftchi	0	(0)
2024–2025	Hakkarigücü	21	
2025–	Yüksekova	3	

International career^{‡}
	Turkey U-19	1	(0)
- * Club domestic league appearances and goals as of 5 October 2025 ‡ National team caps and goals as of 24 February 2014

Güzide Alçu (born 5 July 1997) is a Turkish women's football defender who plays for Yüksekova in the Turkish Super League. She was part of the Turkey women's U-19 team.

== Personal life ==
Güzide Alçu was born in Diyarbakır, southeastern Turkey on July 5, 1997 in a Kurdish family. After completing her secondary education at Diyarbakır Sport High School in the 2014–15 academic term, she was enrolled in the Physical Education and Sports College at Dicle University for the study of Physical Education and Sports Teaching.

== Club career ==
=== Amed ===
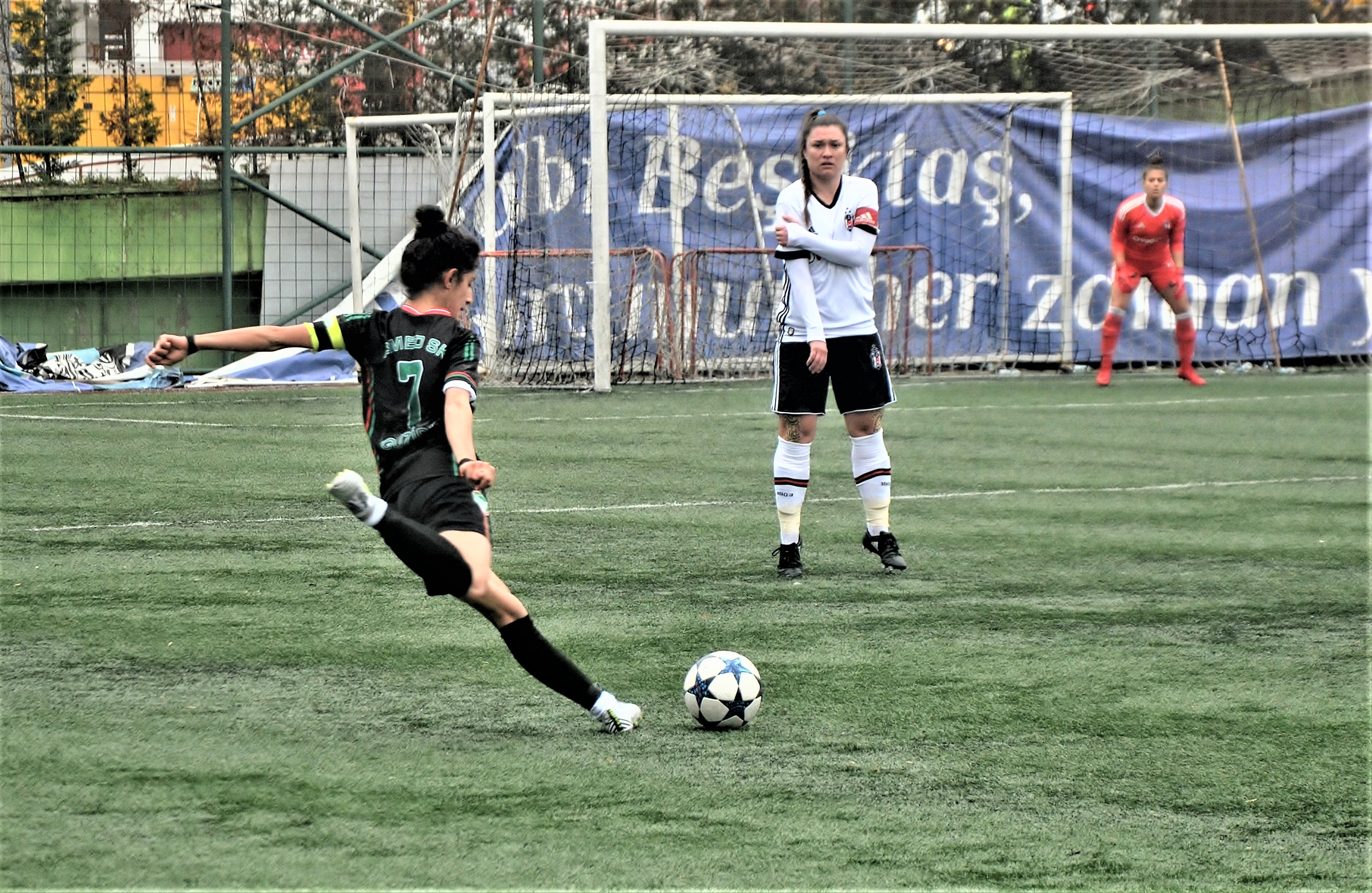
Güzide Alçu (left) performing an indirect free kick against Beşiktaş J.K. in the 2017–18 First League season.

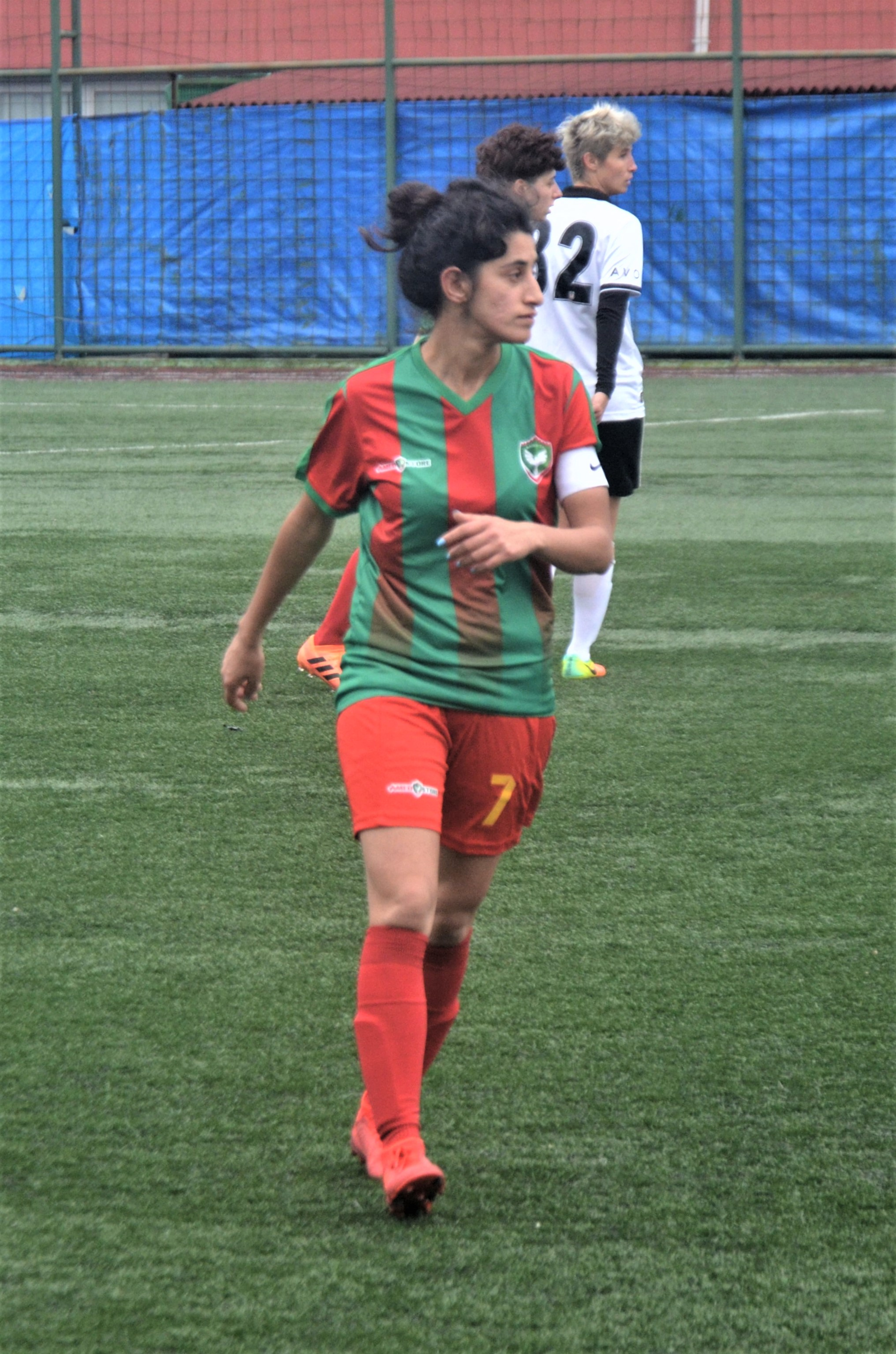
Güzide Alçu of Amed in the 2017-18 Women's First League.

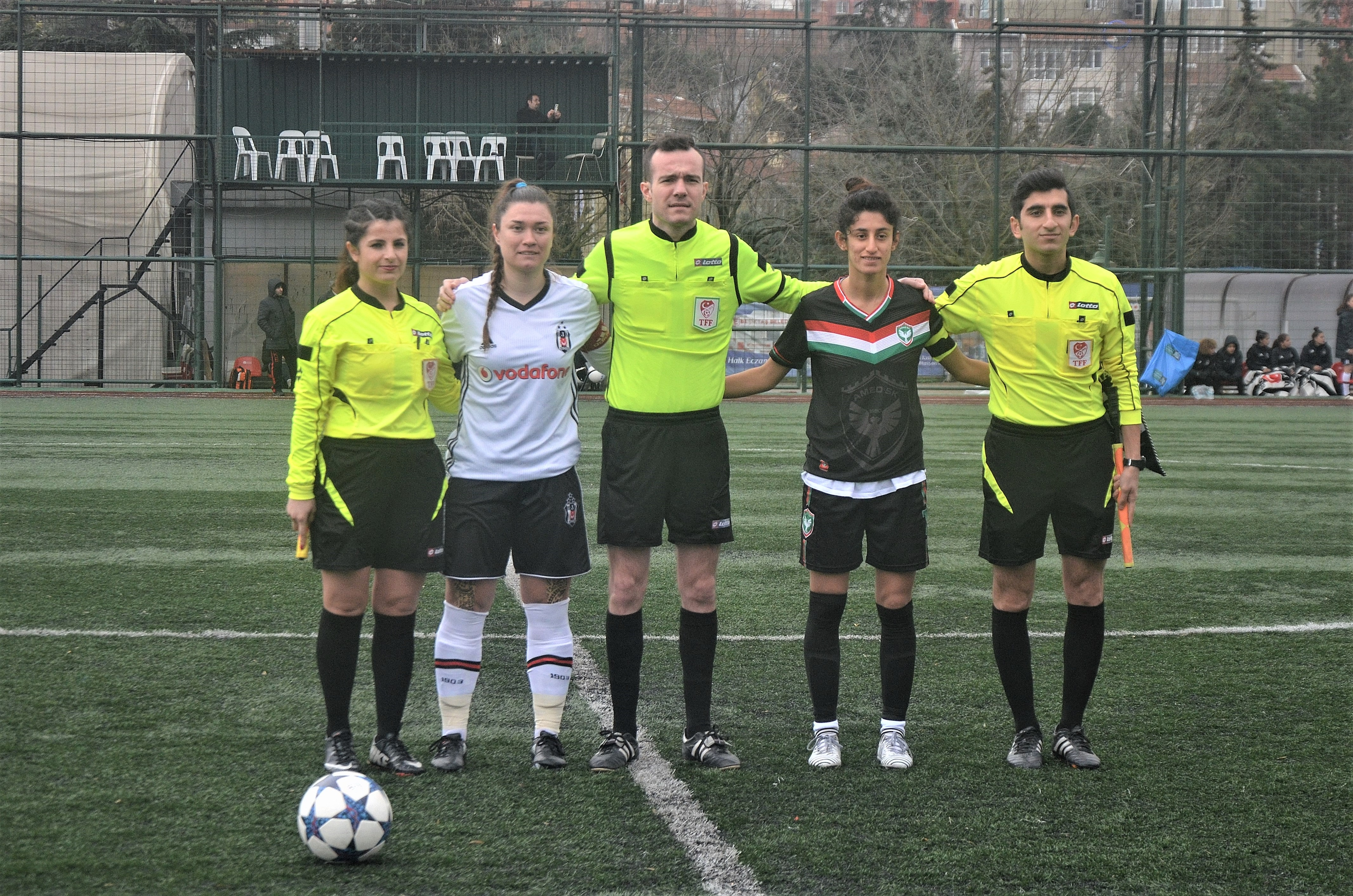
Güzide Alçu (second from right), captain of Amed in the 2017–18 First League match against Beşiktaş

Alçu played football with boys in the youth team of a Diyarbakır club. She obtained her license on April 7, 2011, from her hometown club Diyarbakır B.B. Spor, which had recently formed their women's football team, and was later renamed to Amed She played for the first time in the 2011–12 Women's Second League. At the end of the 2013–14 season, her club was relegated to the Third League. She enjoyed her team's promotion to the Second League at the end of the 2015–16 season, and the next season's unbeaten champion title resulted in her promotion to the First League. Alçu significantly contributed to her team's success by scoring goals. She served as the captain of her team.

==== Discipline for displaying V sign ====
Alçu and two of her teammates of Diyarbakır B.B. Spor displayed V signs to the observers in the stadium at Erzincan after her team's win by an extraordinary score of 24–0 against the Samsun-based Gülizar Hasan Yılmaz Güz Vocational High School Spor in the playoff match of the Women's Third League on March 21, 2015. The Turkish Football Federation (TFF) interpreted the action as an insulting sign of ideological expression for Kurdish separatism of the team members from Diyarbakır and referred the case to the Disciplinary Board of the TFF.

Upon reactions and public indignation, the TFF stepped back. It called the club officials in the late hours of March 26, 2015, and informed that the disciplinary inquiry launched against the four women footballers was lifted.

=== Neftchi ===
On 2 September 2024, Alçu transferred to Azerbaijani club Neftchi PFK, competing in the Azerbaijani Women's Football Championship.

=== Hakkarigücü ===
In September 2024, she transferred to Hakkarigücü to play in the 2024-25 Super Şeague season.

=== Yüksekova ===
After one season, she moved to Yüksekova in the same province, which was promoted to the Turkish Super League.

== International career ==
In 2013, Alçu was called up to the camp of the Turkey girls' U-17 team to get prepared for the 2014 UEFA Women's Under-17 Championship qualification – Group 4 matches. However, she was not selected.

She was admitted to the Turkey women's U-19 team and played only in a friendly match against Azerbaijan on February 24, 2014.

== Career statistics ==
As of 5 October 2025.

Club	Season	League			Continental		National		Total	
Club	Season	Division	Apps	Goals	Apps	Goals	Apps	Goals	Apps	Goals
Diyarbakır BB	2011–12	Second League	7	3	–	–	0	0	7	3
Diyarbakır BB	2012–13	Second League	13	17	–	–	0	0	13	17
Diyarbakır BB	2013–14	Second League	14	14	–	–	1	0	15	14
Diyarbakır BB	2014–15	Third League	12	12	–	–	0	0	12	12
Amed	2015–16	Third League	21	41	–	–	0	0	21	41
Amed	2016–17	Second League	17	14	–	–	0	0	17	14
Amed	2017–18	First League	16	10	–	–	0	0	16	10
Amed	2018–19	First League	9	2	–	–	0	0	9	2
Amed	2019–20	First League	11	5	–	–	0	0	11	5
Amed	2021–22	Super League	22	10	–	–	0	0	22	10
Amed	2022–23	Super League	18	1	–	–	0	0	18	1
Amed	2023–24	Super League	27	2	–	–	0	0	27	2
Total			187	131	–	–	1	0	188	131
Hakkarigücü	2024-25	Super League		0	-	-	0	0	21	0
Yüksekova	2025-26	Super League	3	0	-	-	0	0	3	0
Career total			211	131	–	–	1	0	2012	131
