= Aytaj Sharifova =

Azerbaijani footballer (born 1997)

Aytac Şərifova
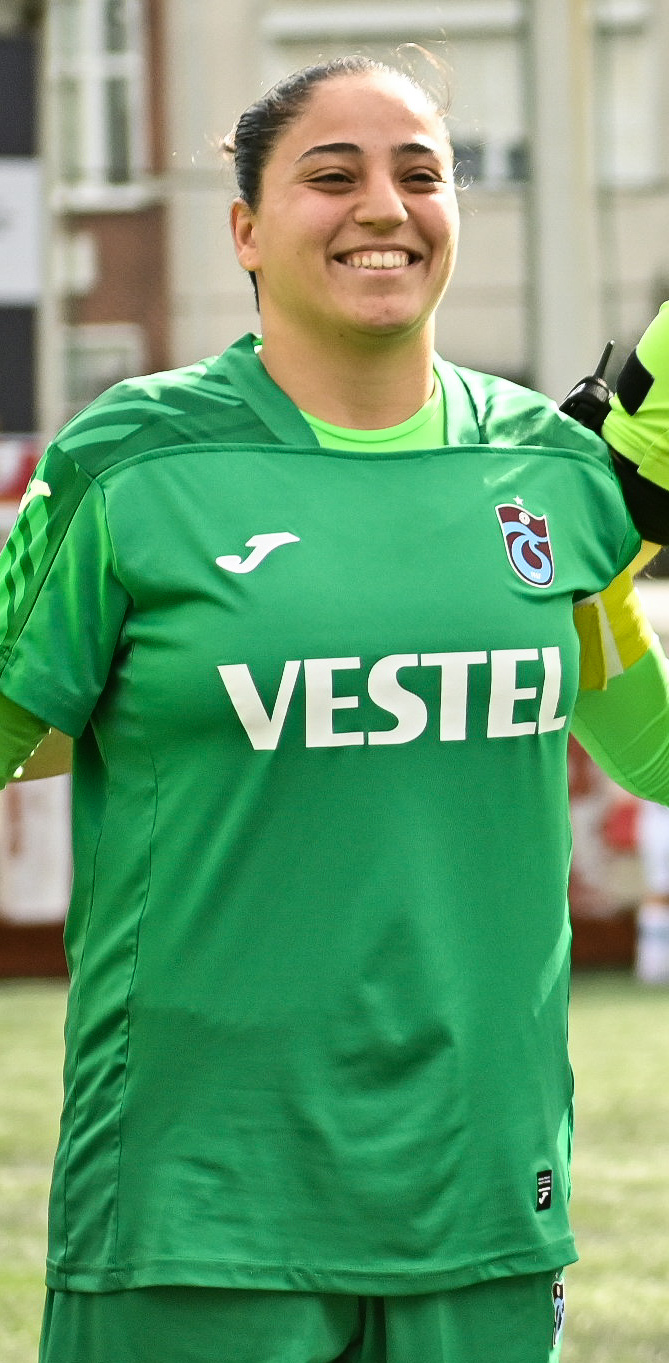

Personal information
- Date of birth: 8 January 1997 (age 29)
- Place of birth: Azerbaijan
- Height: 1.66 m (5 ft 5 in)
- Position: Goalkeeper

Team information
- Current team: Yüksekova
- Number: 66

Senior career*
Years	Team	Apps	(Gls)
2019	Keflavík	15	(0)
2020–2022	Hakkarigücü	28	(0)
2022–2024	Trabzonspor	46	(0)
2024–2025	Hakkarigücü	13	(0)
2025–	Yüksekova	3	(0)

International career^{‡}
2012	Azerbaijan U17	6	(1)
2013–2016	Azerbaijan U19	12	(0)
2019–	Azerbaijan	10	(0)
- * Club domestic league appearances and goals as of 5 October 2025 ‡ National team caps and goals as of 130 November 2021

Aytaj Sharifova (Azerbaijani: Aytac Şərifova; born 8 January 1997) is an Azerbaijani footballer, who plays as a goalkeeper for the Turkish Super League club Yüksekova in Hakkari, and captains the Azerbaijan women's national football team.

== Club career ==
In the beginning of 2020, Sharifova moved to Turkey and joined Hakkarigücü Spor in the second half of the 2019-20 Women's First League. She played again for the Turkish club in the 2021-22 Women's Super League. In the |2022–23 Turkish Women's Super League season, she transferred to Trabzonspor.

Sharifova joined Neftchi in the Azerbaijani women's football championship, on September 2, 2024. On Two weeks later, she returned to Turkey, and signed with her former club Hakkarigücü.

In September 2025, she joined Yüksekova in Hakkari, which was promoted to the Turkish Super League in the |2025–26 season.

== International career ==
Sharifova played for the Azerbaijan national team two matches of the UEFA Women's Euro 2022 qualifying Group D, as well as six matches of the 2023 FIFA Women's World Cup qualification – UEFA Group E.

== Career statistics ==
As of match played 5 October 2025.

Club	Season	League			Continental		National		Total	
Club	Season	Division	Apps	Goals	Apps	Goals	Apps	Goals	Apps	Goals
Keflavík	2019	Icelandic First L	15	0	-	-	0	0	15	0
Hakkarigücü	2019–20	Turkish First League	4	0	-	-	0	0	4	0
Hakkarigücü	2021–22	Turkish Super League	24	0	-	-	6	0	30	0
Hakkarigücü	Total		28	0	-	-	6	0	34	0
Trabzonspor	2022–23	Turkish Super League	19	0	-	-	0	0	19	0
Trabzonspor	2023–24	Turkish Super League	27	0	-	-	0	0	27	0
Trabzonspor	Total		46	0	-	-	0	0	46	0
Hakkarigücü	2024–25	Turkish Super League	13	0	-	-	0	0	13	0
Yüksekova	2025–26	Turkish Super League	3	0	-	-	0	0	3	0

== See also ==
- List of Azerbaijan women's international footballers
