= Fatma Şahin (footballer) =

Turkish footballer (born 1990)

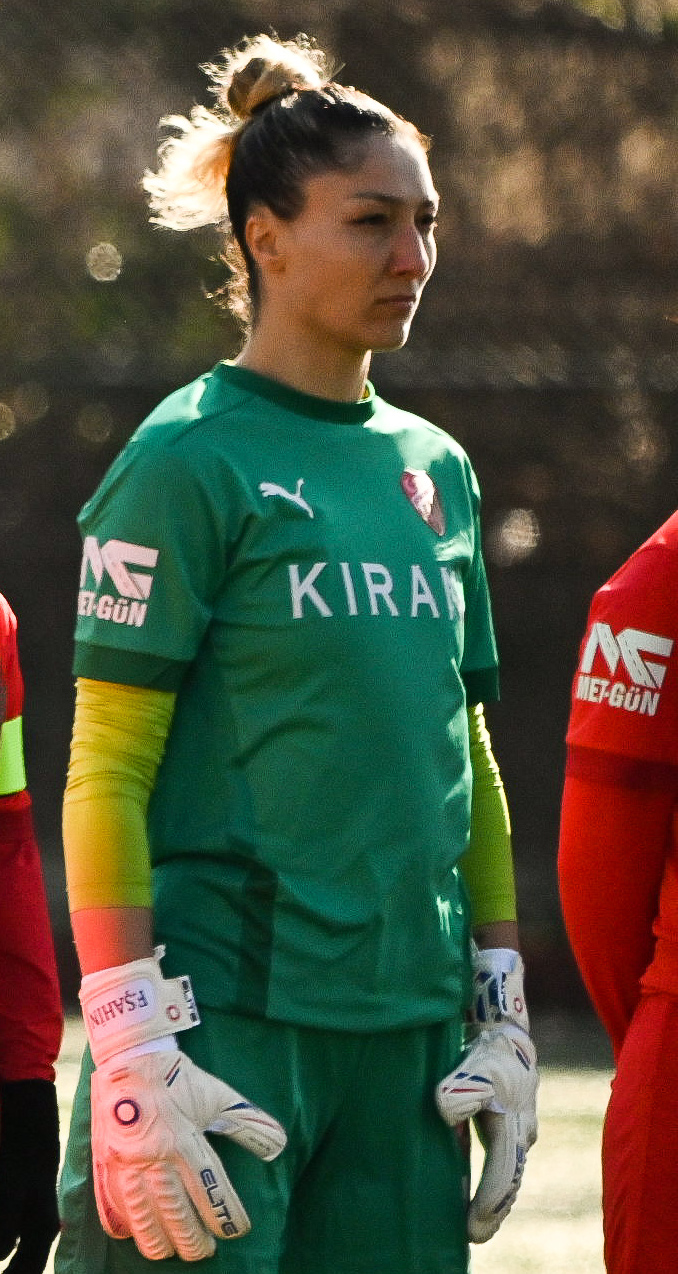
- Fatma Şahin playing for Beylerbeyi in the 2023–24 season

Personal information
- Date of birth: December 15, 1990 (age 35)
- Place of birth: İzmir, Turkey
- Position: Goalkeeper

Team information
- Current team: Fatih Vatan
- Number: 21

Senior career*
Years	Team	Apps	(Gls)
2004–2008	Elit Çimen		
2008–2015	Konak	110	(0)
2015–2017	1207 Antalya	36	(0)
2017–2018	Konak	13	(0)
2018–2023	Beşiktaş	66	(0)
2023–2024	Beylerbeyi	28	(0)
2024–	Fatih Vatan	18	(0)
2024–	Trabzon	1	(0)

International career^{‡}
2006–2008	Turkey U-19	2	(0)
2009–	Turkey	23	(0)
- * Club domestic league appearances and goals as of 11 October 2025 ‡ National team caps and goals as of 28 february 2024

Fatma Şahin (born December 15, 1990) is a Turkish women's footballer who plays as a goalkeeper in the Turkish Super League for Fatih Vatan. She was a member of the Turkey women's national team.

== Early life ==
Fatma Şahin was born on December 15, 1990, in Çiğli, İzmir, where her mother is a native of. She is the second child of the family's three daughters. She grew up in Istanbul and Gebze. The family moved to Izmir as their house in Gebze was damaged by the 1999 İzmit earthquake.

She studies football coaching at the College of Physical Education and Sports of Ege University in İzmir, and will graduate in 2014.

== Club career ==
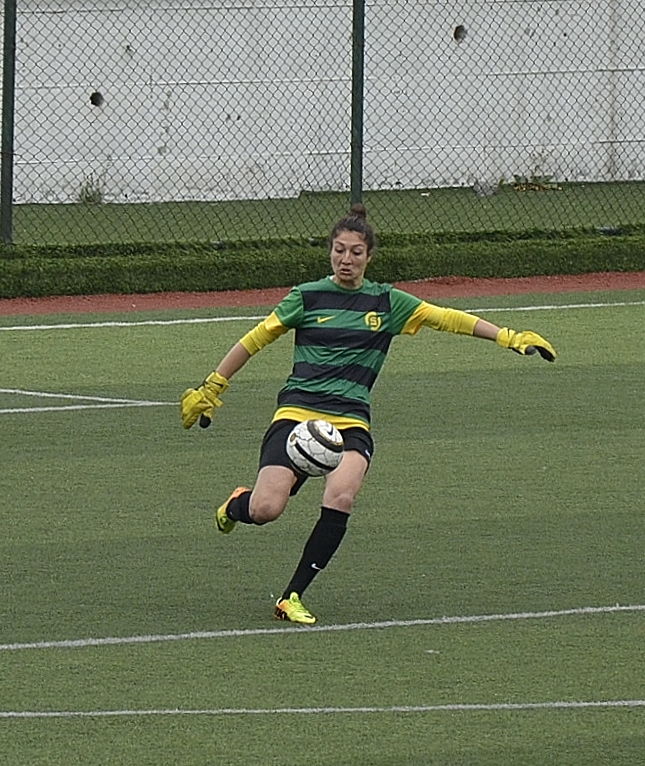
Fatma Şahin playing for Konak Belediyespor in the 2013–14 season.

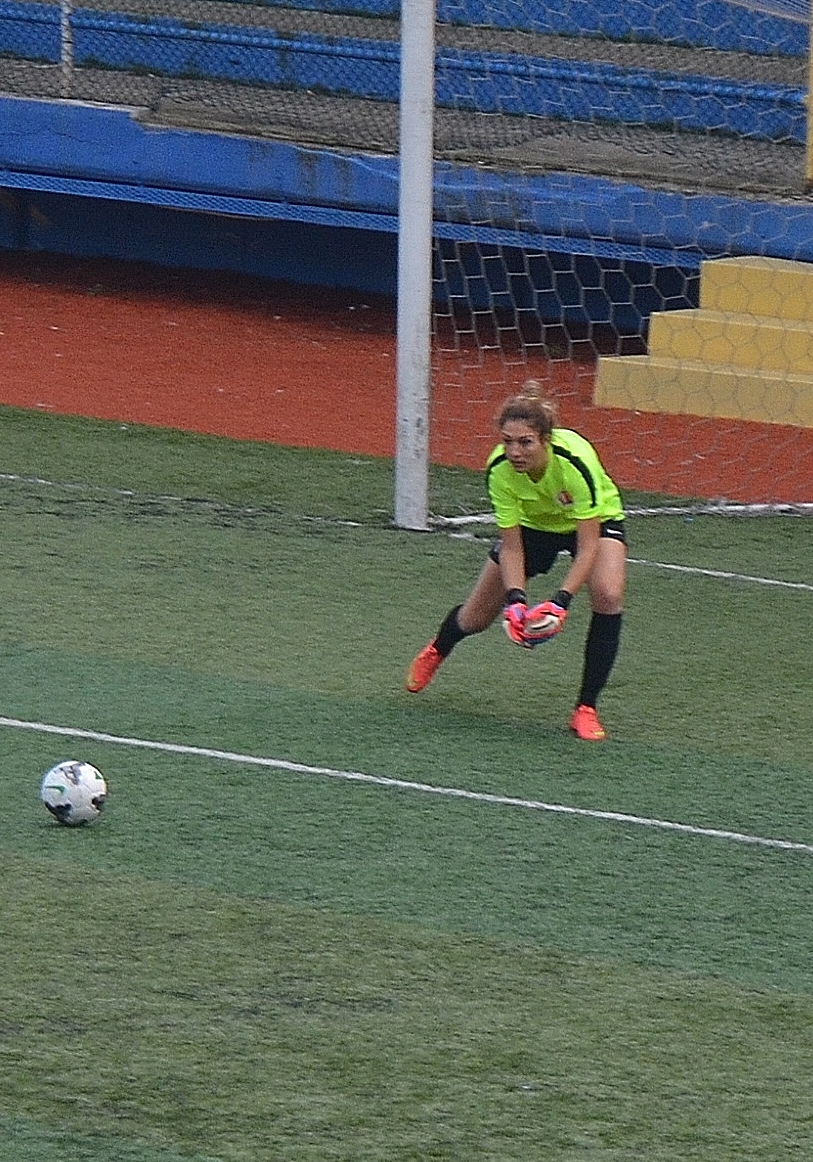
Fatma Şahin playing for 1207 Antalya Muratpaşa Belediye Spor in the 2015–16 season's away match against Kireçburnu Spor.

Şahin began playing football in Elit Çimen, a Balçova-based club in her hometown, after receiving her license on October 22, 2004. Some years later, she wanted to leave the club for the newly established Konak Belediyespor due to disagreement with her coach. However, her club did not release her license, and so she had to take part only at training sessions of Konakspor Belediyespor for one-and-half years. In February 2008, she transferred officially to Konak Belediyespor, where she plays since then.

She made her first appearance in the 2013–14 UEFA Women's Champions League qualifying round match playing against the Bulgarian team FC NSA Sofia on August 8, 2013. Her team managed as the first ever Turkish women's club to make it into the Round of 16. However, the Austrian opponent SV Neulengbach eliminated Konak Belediyespor in two games while Şahin was not able to save the six goals in total. She took part in her team's three matches at the 2014–15 UEFA Women's Champions League qualifying round.

In the 2015–16 season, she transferred to 1207 Antalya Muratpaşa, which was newly promoted from the Women's Second League.

After two seasons, she returned to her former club Konak Belediyespor. Şahin played in three matches of the 2017–18 UEFA Women's Champions League qualifying round in Tbilisi, Georgia.

In the 2018–19 league season, she transferred to Beşiktaş. She enjoyed the champion title of her team in the 2018–19 season. She took part at the 2019–20 UEFA Women's Champions League – Group 9 matches.

In the 2020-21 Turkcell Women's Football League season, she enjoyed the second champion title with her team Beşiktaş J.K. She was honored with the award of Best goalkeeper of the 2020–21 season. She played in two matches of the 2021–22 UEFA Women's Champions League qualifying rounds.

End August 2023, she transferred to Beylerbeyi, which play for the first time in the Super League

For the 2024-25 Super League season, she moved to Fatih Vatan.

After one season, she transferred to Trabzon.

== International career ==
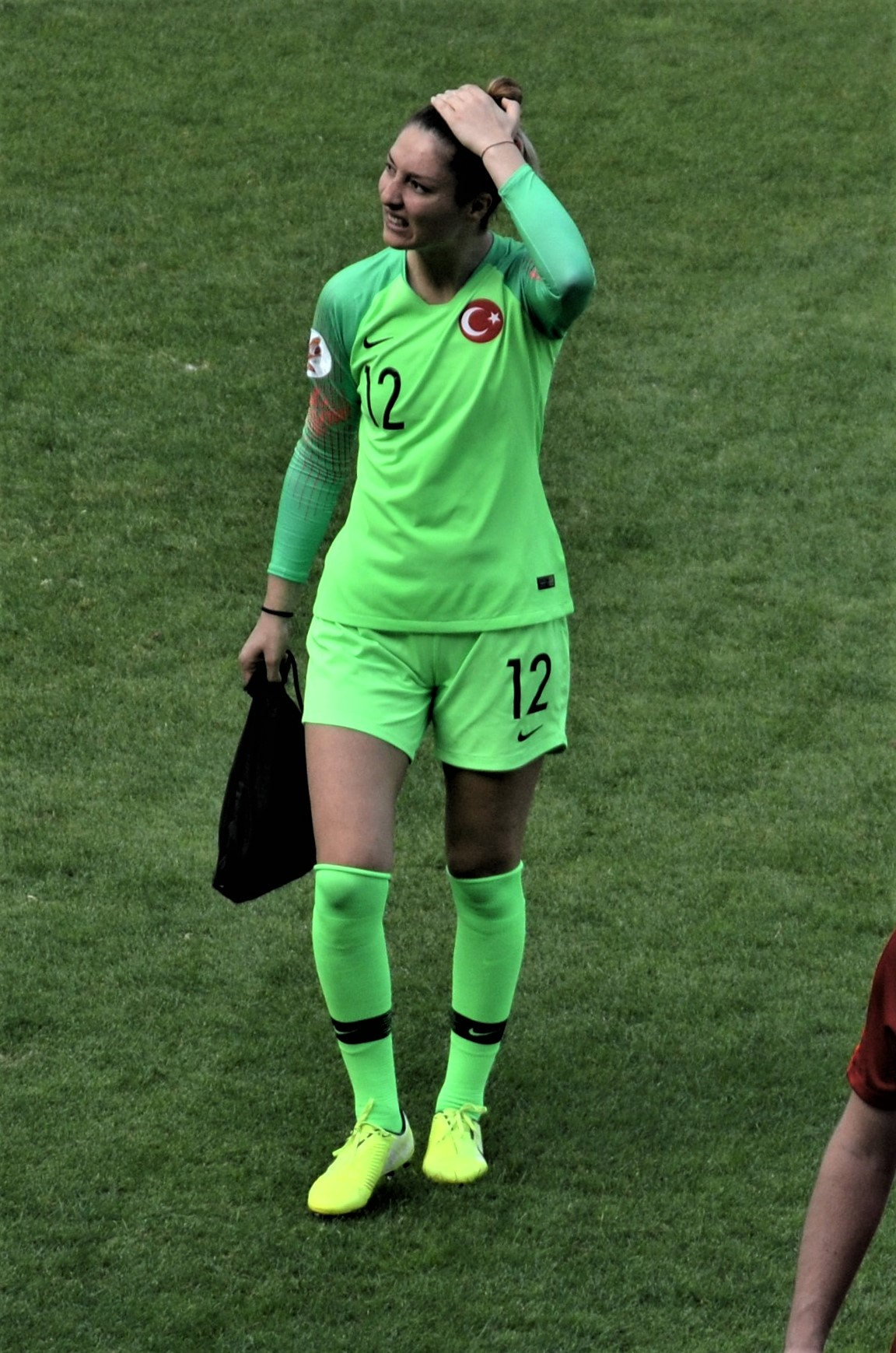
Fatma Şahin of Turkey national team (October 2019)

Şahin made her national team debut in the friendly match against Macedonia women's national football team held on January 22, 2006, entering the game on the 82nd minute. After playing one more match with the national U-19 team, she became a member of the senior team in 2009. As of April 7, 2018, she capped 16 times in the national team.

== Career statistics ==
As of 11 October 2025.

Club	Season	League			Continental		National		Total	
Club	Season	Division	Apps	Goals	Apps	Goals	Apps	Goals	Apps	Goals
Elit Çimen	2005–2007	Second League			–	–	1	0	1	0
Konak	2007–08	First League	–	–	–	–	1	0	1	0
Konak	2008–09	First League	17	0	–	–	1	0	18	0
Konak	2009–10	First League	17	0	–	–	0	0	17	0
Konak	2010–11	First League	19	0	–	–	0	0	19	0
Konak	2011–12	First League	18	0	–	–	5	0	23	0
Konak	2012–13	First League	8	0	-	–	2	0	10	0
Konak	2013–14	First League	16	0	7	0	5	0	28	0
Konak	2014–15	First League	15	0	3	0	1	0	19	0
Konak	Total		110	0	10	0	15	0	135	0
1207 Antalya	2015–16	First	14	0	–	–	0	0	14	0
1207 Antalya	2016–17	First League	22	0	–	–	0	0	22	0
1207 Antalya	Total		36	0	–	–	0	0	36	0
Konak	2017–18	First League	13	0	3	0	2	0	18	0
Beşiktaş	2018–19	First League	12	0	-	-	3	0	15	0
Beşiktaş	2019–20	First League	13	0	3	0	1	0	17	0
Beşiktaş	2020–21	First League	5	0	0	0	1	0	6	0
Beşiktaş	2021–22	Super League	18	0	2	0	1	0	21	0
Beşiktaş	2022–23	Super League	18	0	2	0	0	0	18	0
Beşiktaş	Total		66	0	5	0	6	0	77	0
Beylerbeyi	2023–24	Super League	28	0	0	0	1	0	29	0
Fatih Vatan	2024–25	Super League	18	0	0	0	0	0	18	0
Trabzon	2025–26	Super League	1	0	0	0	0	0	1	0
Career total			272	0	18	0	25	0	315	0

== Honours ==
=== Club ===
Turkish Women's First League

Konak
Winners (3): 2012–13, 2013–14, 2014–15
Runners-up (1): 2010–11
Third place (2): 2009–10, 2017–18

Beşiktaş.
Winners (2): 2018–19, 2020–21

=== Individual ===
- Best goalkeeper: 2020–21 with Beşiktaş J.K.
