= Beylerbeyi S.K. (women's football) =

Turkish women's football team

- Full name: Beylerbeyi Spor Kulübü
- Founded: 2016; 9 years ago
- Ground: Beylerbeyi 75. Yıl Stadium
- Coordinates: 41.03906°N 29.04592°E
- Manager: Mutlucan Zavotçu
- League: Turkish Women's Super League
- 2024–25: 6th

Beylerbeyi Spor Kulübü, formerly Pendik Çamlık Spor, is a Turkish women's football team based at Beylerbeyi neighborhood of Üsküdar district in Istanbul.

== History ==
The club wais in 2022 associated with Pendik Çamlık Spor. The team finished the 2022–23 Turkish First League as champion, and was promoted to the Turkish Super League to play in the 2023–24 season.

== Stadium ==
Beylerbeyi SK play their home matches at Beylerbeyi 75. Yıl Stadium in Beylerbeyi neighborhood of Üsküdar district in Istanbul.

== Statistics ==
As of 28 September 2025.

Season	League	Rank	Pld	W	D	L	GF	GA	GD	Pts
2016–17	Third League – Gr. 2	1	22	19	1	2	104	22	+82	58
2017–18	Third League – Gr. 2	2	10	7	1	2	45	6	+39	22
2018–19	Third League – Gr. 2	1	10	10	0	0	62	10	+52	30
2019–20	Third League – Gr. 2	1	15	14	1	0	102	3	+99	43
2021–22	First League (^{1}) – Gr. D	3	11	6	1	4	28	14	+14	19
2022–23	First League	1	24	22	2	0	97	9	+88	68
2023–24	Super League	5	30	17	6	7	68	25	+43	57
2024–25	Super League	6	26	13	6	7	51	35	+16	45
2025–26	Super League	16^{(2)}	1	0	0	1	0	3	-3	-3
Green marks a season followed by promotion, red a season followed by relegation.

Notes

- (^{1}): Turkish Second League was renamed to Turkish First League
- (^{2}): League in progress

== Current squad ==
As of 22 September 2025.

Squad list not known.

== Former notable players ==
- (Burkina Faso) Madinatou Rouamba
- (Brazil) Camila Santos
- (Bulgaria) Nadezhda Ivanova
- (Canada) Holly O'Neill
- (Ivory Coast) Nina Kpaho
- (Cameroon) Rose Bella
- (Cameroon) Alexandra Takounda
- (Democratic Republic of the Congo) Marlène Kasaj
- (Northern Cyprus) Zehra Borazancı
- (South Africa) Chuene Morifi
- (Trinidad and Tobago) Kennya Cordner
- (Turkey) Derya Arhan
- (Turkey) Çiğdem Belci
- (Turkey) Sevgi Çınar
- (Turkey) Kader Hançar
- (Turkey) Berivan İçen
- (Turkey) Fatma Kara
- (Turkey) Safa Merve Nalçacı
- (Turkey) Fatöa Şahin
- (Turkey) Duygu Yılmaz
- (United States) Elena Gracinda Santos

== Kit history ==
2023–24 home	2024–25 home	2024–25 away
