= 2021–22 Fenerbahçe S.K. (women's football) season =

Fenerbahçe
2021–22 season
- President: Ali Koç
- Head coach: Nihan Su
- Stadium: Beylerbeyi 75. Yıl Stadium
- Turkish Women's Football Super League: Group A, 1st
- Play-offs: Semi-finals
- Top goalscorer: League: Kennya Cordner (34); All: Kennya Cordner (34)
| Home colours | Away colours |

The 2021–22 season was the 1st season in the existence of Fenerbahçe S.K. women's football team and the club's first season in the top flight of Turkish football.

== Kits ==
- Supplier: Puma
- Main sponsor: Alagöz Holding
- Back sponsor: Alagöz Holding
- Sleeve sponsor: 1907 Fenerbahçe Derneği
- Short sponsor: Hasanbey Çiftliği
- Socks sponsor: —

Home
Away
Home alt.
Goalkeeper 1
Goalkeeper 2

== Squad ==
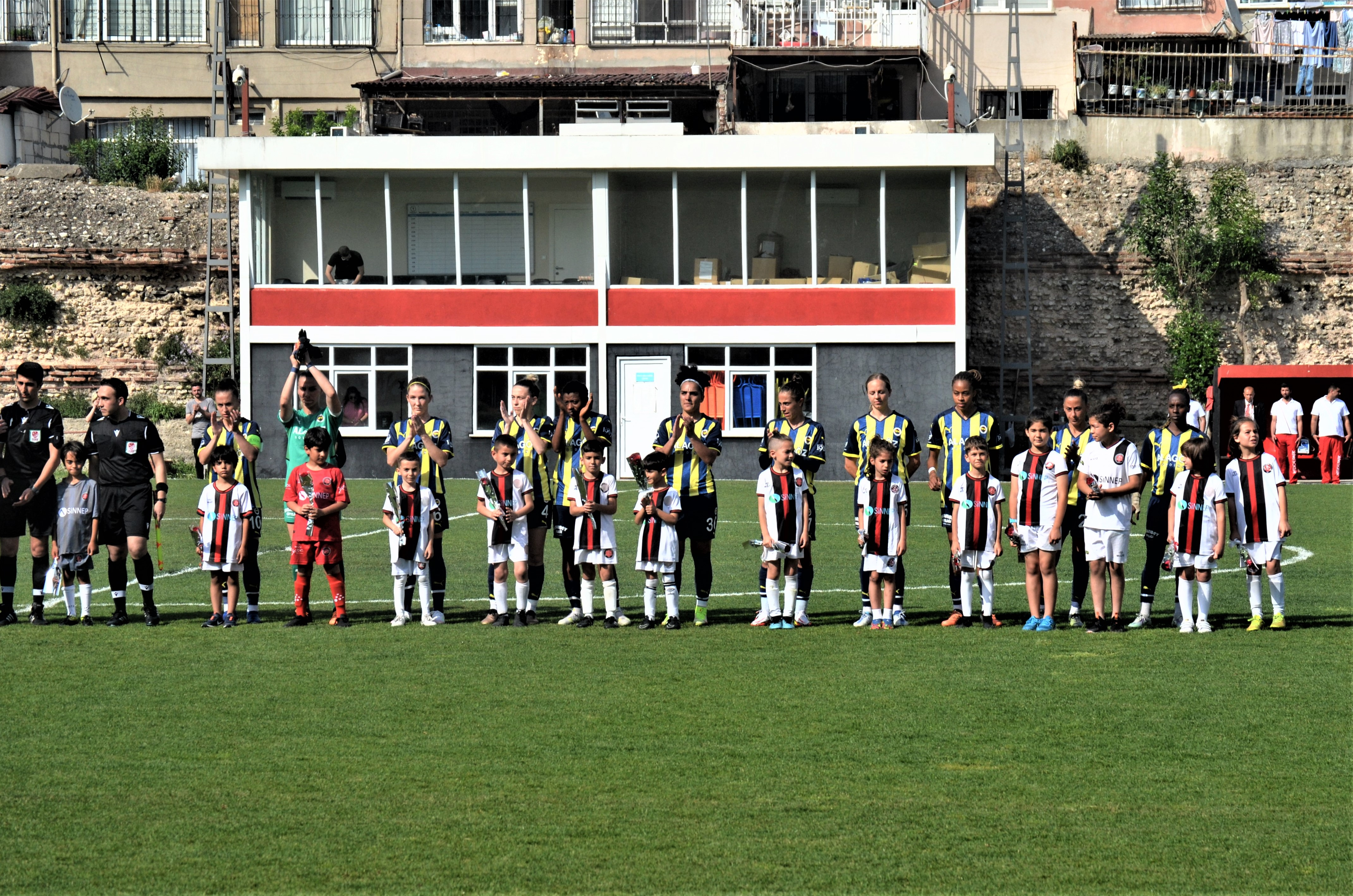
Fenerbahçe women's squad in the away match of the 2021-22 Turkish Women's Football Super League play-off against Fatih Karagümrük women's.

As of 3 February 2022

Note: Flags indicate national team as defined under FIFA eligibility rules; some limited exceptions apply. Players may hold more than one non-FIFA nationality.

| No. | Pos. | Nation | Player |
|---|---|---|---|
| 1 | GK | (Turkey) TUR | Ezgi Çağlar |
| 2 | DF | (Turkey) TUR | Safa Merve Nalçacı |
| 3 | DF | (Azerbaijan) AZE | Beyzanur Aslan |
| 4 | DF | (Turkey) TUR | Demet Bozkurt |
| 5 | DF | (Turkey) TUR | Narin Yakut |
| 6 | DF | (Turkey) TUR | Jessica Lynne Çarmıklı |
| 7 | FW | (Turkey) TUR | Setenay Sırım |
| 8 | MF | (Turkey) TUR | Altun Sancar |
| 9 | FW | (Namibia) NAM | Zenatha Coleman |
| 10 | MF | (Turkey) TUR | Fatma Kara Şahinbaş (captain) |
| 15 | MF | (United States) USA | Erin Michelle Yenney |
| 16 | MF | (Turkey) TUR | Neslihan Aktaş |
| 17 | DF | (Turkey) TUR | Emine Yaren Çolak |
| 18 | MF | (Turkey) TUR | Songül Demirtürk |

| No. | Pos. | Nation | Player |
|---|---|---|---|
| 19 | FW | (Trinidad and Tobago) TRI | Kennya Cordner |
| 20 | MF | (Turkey) TUR | Dilan Aslan |
| 21 | FW | (England) ENG | Shameeka Fishley |
| 23 | MF | (Turkey) TUR | Zeynep Ülkü Kahya |
| 24 | DF | (Turkey) TUR | Sevinç Çorlu |
| 25 | GK | (Turkey) TUR | Zeynep Akdeniz |
| 27 | MF | (Portugal) POR | Mariana Pereira Jaleca |
| 28 | DF | (Turkey) TUR | Rabia Göksu Gökçe |
| 30 | DF | (Ivory Coast) CIV | Nina Kpaho |
| 36 | MF | (Turkey) TUR | Dilan Bora |
| 41 | DF | (Turkey) TUR | İlayda Cansu Kara |
| 80 | MF | (Turkey) TUR | Berdan Bozkurt |
| 98 | GK | (Turkey) TUR | Zuhal Ezer |

== Transfers ==
=== In ===
| No. | Pos. | Nat. | Player | Moving from | Type | Source |
Summer
| 41 | DF | (Turkey) | İlayda Cansu Kara | Kocaeli | Transfer | |
| 1 | GK | (Turkey) | Ezgi Çağlar | Fatih Vatan | Transfer | |
| 8 | MF | (Turkey) | Altun Sancar | Fatih Vatan | Transfer | |
| 4 | DF | (Turkey) | Demet Bozkurt | Beşiktaş | Transfer | |
| 2 | DF | (Turkey) | Safa Merve Nalçacı | Kireçburnu | Transfer | |
| 17 | DF | (Turkey) | Emine Yaren Çolak | Beşiktaş | Transfer | |
| 20 | MF | (Turkey) | Dilan Aslan | Kayseri | Transfer | |
| 80 | MF | (Turkey) | Berdan Bozkurt | Beşiktaş | Transfer | |
| 5 | DF | (Turkey) | Narin Yakut | Kayseri | Transfer | |
| 18 | MF | (Turkey) | Songül Demirtürk | Kemer FK | Transfer | |
| 7 | FW | (Turkey) | Setenay Sırım | İlkadım Bld. | Transfer | |
| 10 | MF | (Turkey) | Fatma Kara Şahinbaş | (Germany) 1. FFC Recklinghausen | Transfer | |
| 23 | MF | (Turkey) | Ülkü Kahya | İlkadım Bld. | Transfer | |
| 16 | MF | (Turkey) | Neslihan Aktaş | (Switzerland) BSC Old Boys | Transfer | |
| 28 | DF | (Turkey) | Rabia Göksu Gökçe | Kireçburnu | Transfer | |
| 3 | DF | (Azerbaijan) | Beyzanur Aslan | 1207 Antalya | Transfer | |
| 36 | MF | (Turkey) | Dilan Bora | Hakkarigücü | Transfer | |
| 30 | DF | (Ivory Coast) | Nina Kpaho | (Ivory Coast) Juventus de Yopougon | Transfer | |
| 98 | GK | (Turkey) | Zuhal Ezer | Kemer FK | Transfer | |
| 25 | GK | (Turkey) | Zeynep Akdeniz | İlkadım Bld. | Transfer | |
| 27 | MF | (Portugal) | Mariana Jaleca | (Finland) Åland United | Transfer | |
| 15 | MF | (United States) | Erin Yenney | | Transfer | |
| 21 | FW | (England) | Shameeka Fishley | (Spain) Logroño | Transfer | |
| 19 | FW | (Trinidad and Tobago) | Kennya Cordner | (Norway) Sandviken | Transfer | |
Winter
| 6 | DF | (Turkey) | Jessica Çarmıklı | Administrative manager | | |
| 9 | FW | (Namibia) | Zenatha Coleman | (Spain) Sevilla | Transfer | |
| 24 | DF | (Turkey) | Sevinç Çorlu | Konak Belediyespor | Transfer | |

== Technical staff ==
As of 3 September 2021

| Position | Staff |
|---|---|
| Administrative Manager | (Turkey) Jessica Lynne Çarmıklı |
| Head Coach | (Turkey) Nihan Su |
| Assistant Coach | (Turkey) Yeliz Demir |
| Goalkeeping Coach | (Turkey) Tayfun Özdemir |
| Athletic Performance Coach | (Turkey) Samet Kösemen |

== Pre-season ==
Win Draw Loss Fixtures

| 17 November 2021 Friendly | Beşiktaş | 2–1 | Fenerbahçe |

| 7 December 2021 Friendly | Galatasaray | 0–7 | Fenerbahçe | Sarıyer, Istanbul, Turkey |
| | Daniels (red card) 5' | Report | Şahinbaş 10' (pen.); Bozkurt 15'; Fishley 30', 34', 38'; Cordner 41'; Sırım 51' | Stadium: Nef Stadium; Referee: Cansu Tiryaki; Assistant referees: Betül Nur Yılmaz, Sedef Aktan |

== Competitions ==
=== Overall record ===
| Competition | First match | Last match | Starting round | Final position | Record | | | | | | | |
| Competition | First match | Last match | Starting round | Final position | Pld | W | D | L | GF | GA | GD | Win % |
|---|---|---|---|---|---|---|---|---|---|---|---|---|
| Super League | 18 December 2021 | 8 May 2022 | Matchday 1 | 1st | 22 | 19 | 1 | 2 | 104 | 15 | +89 | 86.36 |
| Super League Play-offs | 21 May 2022 | 5 June 2022 | Quarter-finals | Semi-finals | 4 | 1 | 2 | 1 | 6 | 4 | +2 | 25.00 |
| Total | | | | | 26 | 20 | 3 | 3 | 110 | 19 | +91 | 76.92 |

Source: FootyStats

=== Turkish Women's Football Super League ===
==== League table (Group A) ====
| Pos | Team | Pld | W | D | L | GF | GA | GD | Pts | Qualification |
|---|---|---|---|---|---|---|---|---|---|---|
| 1 | Fenerbahçe | 22 | 19 | 1 | 2 | 104 | 15 | +89 | 58 | Quarterfinals |
| 2 | Beşiktaş | 22 | 19 | 0 | 3 | 104 | 18 | +86 | 57 | Quarterfinals |
| 3 | Fatih Vatan | 22 | 15 | 2 | 5 | 45 | 19 | +26 | 47 | Quarterfinals |
| 4 | 1207 Antalya | 22 | 15 | 2 | 5 | 51 | 24 | +27 | 47 | Quarterfinals |
| 5 | Ankara BB Fomget | 22 | 15 | 2 | 5 | 76 | 16 | +60 | 47 | |
| 6 | Kdz. Ereğli | 22 | 12 | 2 | 8 | 50 | 34 | +16 | 38 | |
| 7 | Amed | 22 | 8 | 1 | 13 | 30 | 51 | −21 | 25 | |
| 8 | Ataşehir | 22 | 8 | 0 | 14 | 34 | 38 | −4 | 24 | |
| 9 | Altay | 22 | 4 | 1 | 17 | 21 | 91 | −70 | 13 | Play-out |
| 10 | Hatayspor | 22 | 3 | 3 | 16 | 20 | 62 | −42 | 12 | Play-out |
| 11 | Kocaeli (R) | 22 | 3 | 1 | 18 | 27 | 104 | −77 | 10 | Play-out |
| 12 | Kireçburnu | 22 | 2 | 3 | 17 | 14 | 104 | −90 | 9 | Play-out |

Source: TFF.org
(R) Relegated

==== Results summary ====
| Overall | | | | | | | | Home | | | | | | Away | | | | | |
| Pld | W | D | L | GF | GA | GD | Pts | W | D | L | GF | GA | GD | W | D | L | GF | GA | GD |
|---|---|---|---|---|---|---|---|---|---|---|---|---|---|---|---|---|---|---|---|
| 22 | 19 | 1 | 2 | 104 | 15 | +89 | 58 | 11 | 0 | 0 | 56 | 6 | +50 | 8 | 1 | 2 | 48 | 9 | +39 |

Source: Competitive matches

==== Results by round ====
| Round | 1 | 2 | 3 | 4 | 5 | 6 | 7 | 8 | 9 | 10 | 11 | 12 | 13 | 14 | 15 | 16 | 17 | 18 | 19 | 20 | 21 | 22 |
|---|---|---|---|---|---|---|---|---|---|---|---|---|---|---|---|---|---|---|---|---|---|---|
| Ground | A | H | A | H | A | H | A | H | A | H | H | H | A | H | A | H | A | H | A | H | A | A |
| Result | L | W | W | W | L | W | W | W | W | W | W | W | W | W | D | W | W | W | W | W | W | W |
| Position | 7 | 5 | 3 | 2 | 5 | 5 | 4 | 2 | 2 | 2 | 2 | 2 | 2 | 2 | 2 | 2 | 2 | 2 | 1 | 1 | 1 | 1 |

Source: Competitive matches
A = Away; H = Home; W = Win; D = Draw; L = Loss

==== Matches ====
| 18 December 2021 1 | Beşiktaş | 2–1 | Fenerbahçe | Istanbul |
| 15:00 TRT (UTC+3) | Uraz 10'; Karabulut 26' | Report | Cordner (yellow card) 38' (goal) 39'; İ. Kara (yellow card) 20'; Bozkurt (yellow card) 86' | Stadium: Vodafone Park; Referee: Neslihan Muratdağ |

| 25 December 2021 2 | Fenerbahçe | 5–0 | 1207 Antalya | Istanbul |
| 14:30 TRT (UTC+3) | Fishley 1', 28'; Cordner 23', 39', 59'; Yenney (yellow card) 72' | Report | Amankrah (yellow card) 68' | Stadium: Dereağzı Lefter Küçükandonyadis Facilities; Referee: Elif Köroğlu |

| 29 December 2021 3 | Ataşehir | 0–3 | Fenerbahçe | Istanbul |
| 12:00 TRT (UTC+3) | Motevallitaher (yellow card) 77' | Report | İ. Kara 44'; Fishley 50', 68'; Yakut (yellow card) 37' | Stadium: Yenisahra Stadium; Referee: Neslihan Muratdağ |

| 9 January 2022 4 | Fenerbahçe | 2–1 | Ankara BB Fomget | Istanbul |
| 12:00 TRT (UTC+3) | Cordner 75'; Fishley 85' | Report | Yıldırım 44'; Djomo (yellow card) 81'; Hajiyeva (yellow card) 84'; Semercioğlu (yellow card) 87' | Stadium: Dereağzı Lefter Küçükandonyadis Facilities; Referee: Cansu Tiryaki |

| 12 January 2022 5 | Fatih Vatan | 1–0 | Fenerbahçe | Istanbul |
| 12:00 TRT (UTC+3) | Madiba 88' | Report | Fishley (yellow card) 60' | Stadium: Fatih Mimar Sinan Stadium; Referee: Mehmet Alperen Güçyetmez |

| 16 January 2022 6 | Fenerbahçe | 3–1 | Amed | Istanbul |
| 12:00 TRT (UTC+3) | İ. Kara 27'; Yakut 63'; Şahinbaş 90+3' | Report | Alçu (yellow card) 38' (goal) 79' (pen.) | Stadium: Dereağzı Lefter Küçükandonyadis Facilities; Referee: Ertuğrul Kösterelioğlu |

| 24 January 2022 7 | Hatayspor | 1–8 | Fenerbahçe | Hatay |
| 12:00 TRT (UTC+3) | Gülsever (yellow card) 70'; Gültekin 88' | Report | Fishley 17', 27', 61'; Şeylan 44' (o.g.), 71' (o.g.); Şahinbaş 29'; Sırım 35'; Cordner 90+1' | Stadium: Defne Atatürk Stadium; Referee: Mehmet İhsan Derme |

| 23 March 2022 8 | Fenerbahçe | 8–0 | Altay | Istanbul |
| 14:00 TRT (UTC+3) | Şahinbaş 12' (pen.); Fishley 41', 45+3'; Cordner 43', 62', 86'; Yakut 83'; Sırım 90+2' | Report | | Stadium: Beylerbeyi 75. Yıl Stadium; Referee: Alp Tanırgan |

| 2 February 2022 9 | Kireçburnu | 0–10 | Fenerbahçe | Istanbul |
| 12:00 TRT (UTC+3) | Esfahanian (yellow card) 61' | Report | Bozkurt 20', 26', 62'; Fishley 22'; Yenney 30'; Cordner 63', 65', 78'; Şahinbaş 80'; Kpaho 86' (pen.) | Stadium: Çayırbaşı Stadium; Referee: Oğuzhan Demir |

| 6 February 2022 10 | Fenerbahçe | 8–0 | Kocaeli | Istanbul |
| 12:00 TRT (UTC+3) | Cordner 13', 21', 37'; Coleman 31', 41', 45+1'; Şahinbaş 80'; Kahya 87' | Report | Balaban (yellow card) 90+2'; Karaovalı (yellow card) 90+3' | Stadium: Beylerbeyi 75. Yıl Stadium; Referee: Gülhan Terlik |

| 13 February 2022 11 | Fenerbahçe | 6–1 | Kdz. Ereğli | Istanbul |
| 12:00 TRT (UTC+3) | Cordner 27', 38', 58', 71'; Coleman 32', 62' | Report | Yılmaz 84' | Stadium: Beylerbeyi 75. Yıl Stadium; Referee: Emine Öz |

| 27 February 2022 12 | Fenerbahçe | 2–1 | Beşiktaş | Istanbul |
| 12:00 TRT (UTC+3) | Coleman 10'; Cordner 40' (pen.); Şahinbaş (yellow card) 68' | Report | Kerimoğlu 90'; Şahin (red card) 49' | Stadium: Beylerbeyi 75. Yıl Stadium; Referee: Cansu Tiryaki |

| 5 March 2022 13 | 1207 Antalya | 1–3 | Fenerbahçe | Antalya |
| 12:00 TRT (UTC+3) | Özkumru (yellow card) 19'; Amankrah (yellow card) 45'; Kartal 72'; Yavuz (yellow card) 80' | Report | Fishley 13'; Çarmıklı 78'; Cordner 83'; Şahinbaş 90+5' | Stadium: Zeytinköy Stadium; Referee: Sedef Kıranoğlu |

| 9 March 2022 14 | Fenerbahçe | 4–0 | Ataşehir | Istanbul |
| 12:00 TRT (UTC+3) | Cordner 18', 43', 51'; Sırım 63' (pen.); Çorlu (yellow card) 35'; Kahya (yellow card) 86' | Report | Adu (yellow card) 15'; Mbadi (yellow card) 78' | Stadium: Beylerbeyi 75. Yıl Stadium; Referee: Sema Süer |

| 19 March 2022 15 | Ankara BB Fomget | 1–1 | Fenerbahçe | Ankara |
| 12:00 TRT (UTC+3) | Jbarah 26' (yellow card) 70'; Özev (yellow card) 30'; Polat (yellow card) 50'; Hajiyeva (red card) 83'; Shmatko (yellow card) 58' | Report | Şahinbaş 55' (yellow card) 78'; Bozkurt (yellow card) 90' | Stadium: Osmanlı Stadium; Referee: Melek Dakan |

| 27 March 2022 16 | Fenerbahçe | 2–1 | Fatih Vatan | Istanbul |
| 12:00 TRT (UTC+3) | Şahinbaş 3' (pen.); Cordner (yellow card) 81' (goal) 90+6'; İ. Kara (yellow card) 77' | Report | Ataş 8' (pen.); Ada (yellow card) 15'; Demir (yellow card) 45+4' | Stadium: Beylerbeyi 75. Yıl Stadium; Referee: Atakan Kozik |

| 2 April 2022 17 | Amed | 1–2 | Fenerbahçe | Diyarbakır |
| 12:00 TRT (UTC+3) | Alçu 10'; Makaya (yellow card) 44'; Ateş (yellow card) 77'; Ödüngit (red card) 90+10'; Demir (red card) 90+10'; Dolu (red card) 90+10' | Report | Yenney 19'; Bozkurt (yellow card) 42'; Cordner 90+7' (pen.); Çağlar (yellow card) 90+8'; Çorlu (red card) 90+10'; Aslan (red card) 90+10'; Gökçe (red card) 90+10' | Stadium: Amedspor Facilities; Referee: Birkan Altındaş |

| 17 April 2022 18 | Fenerbahçe | 6–0 | Hatayspor | Istanbul |
| 12:00 TRT (UTC+3) | Jaleca 6'; Cordner (yellow card) 15' (goal) 23'; Fishley 60', 64', 73'; Yenney 68' | Report | | Stadium: Beylerbeyi 75. Yıl Stadium; Referee: Ruken Dağ |

| 24 December 2022 19 | Altay | 0–11 | Fenerbahçe | İzmir |
| 11:00 TRT (UTC+3) | | Report | Cordner 11', 23', 31', 53'; Öztürk 14' (o.g.); Coleman 33'; Yenney 39'; Jaleca 45+2', 87'; Fishley 58', 65' | Stadium: Atatürk 1 Nolu Yan Saha; Referee: Oğuzhan Hamitoğlu |

| 30 April 2022 20 | Fenerbahçe | 10–1 | Kireçburnu | Istanbul |
| 12:00 TRT (UTC+3) | Yenney 6', 33'; Yakut 7'; Fishley 17', 40', 62'; Çarmıklı 37'; Kpaho 45'; Sırım 69'; Jaleca 80' | Report | Sivrikaya 73' | Stadium: Beylerbeyi 75. Yıl Stadium; Referee: Melih Aldemir |

| 5 May 2022 21 | Kocaeli | 2–7 | Fenerbahçe | Kocaeli |
| 12:00 TRT (UTC+3) | Çelebi (yellow card) 60' (goal) 67'; Dağdelen 90+2' | Report | Jaleca 16'; Cordner 22'; Deniz 42' (o.g.); Kpaho 43', 45+2'; Fishley 55', 90' | Stadium: Mehmet Ali Kağıtçı Stadium; Referee: Metin Ataş |

| 8 May 2022 22 | Kdz. Ereğli | 0–2 | Fenerbahçe | Ereğli, Zonguldak |
| 12:00 TRT (UTC+3) | | Report | Coleman 16'; Fishley 24' | Stadium: Beyçayırı Stadium; Referee: Nihat Hartlı |

==== Play-offs ====
===== Quarter-finals =====
| 13 May 2022 First leg | Hakkarigücü | 1–1 | Fenerbahçe | Hakkâri |
| 12:00 TRT (UTC+3) | Çalçınar 34'; Adam (yellow card) 82' | Report | Cordner 69'; Çorlu (yellow card) 86' | Stadium: Merzan Stadium; Referee: Nurullah Çiftçi |

| 21 May 2022 Second leg | Fenerbahçe | 3–0 (4–1 agg.) | Hakkarigücü | Istanbul |
| 16:00 TRT (UTC+3) | Şahinbaş 44'; Cordner 68' (yellow card) 72'; Coleman 75' | Report | Khojasheva (yellow card) 44' | Stadium: Beylerbeyi 75. Yıl Stadium; Referee: Mete Aylıoğlu |

===== Semi-finals =====
| 28 May 2022 First leg | Fatih Karagümrük | 1–0 | Fenerbahçe | Istanbul |
| 17:00 TRT (UTC+3) | Msipa 75'; Türkoğlu (yellow card) 90+6' | Report | Fishley (yellow card) 70'; Çağlar (yellow card) 83'; Şahinbaş (yellow card) 87' | Stadium: Vefa Stadium; Referee: Oğuzhan Talha Karakuş |

| 5 June 2022 Second leg | Fenerbahçe | 2–2 (2–3 agg.) | Fatih Karagümrük | Istanbul |
| 18:00 TRT (UTC+3) | Çarmıklı (yellow card) 36'; Kıvanç 68' (o.g.); Coleman 81' (pen.); Şahinbaş (yellow card) 90' | Report | Ayhan (yellow card) 29'; Türkoğlu 45+1'; Duman 48' (pen.) | Stadium: Beylerbeyi 75. Yıl Stadium; Referee: Can Cengiz |

== Statistics ==
=== Appearances and goals ===
| No. | Pos. | Player | Süper Lig | | Total | |
| No. | Pos. | Player | Apps | Goals | Apps | Goals |
|---|---|---|---|---|---|---|
| 1 | GK | (Turkey) Ezgi Çağlar | 23 | 0 | 23 | 0 |
| 2 | DF | (Turkey) Safa Merve Nalçacı | 17 | 0 | 17 | 0 |
| 3 | DF | (Azerbaijan) Beyzanur Aslan | 10 | 0 | 10 | 0 |
| 4 | DF | (Turkey) Demet Bozkurt | 16 | 0 | 16 | 0 |
| 5 | DF | (Turkey) Narin Yakut | 13 | 3 | 13 | 3 |
| 6 | DF | (Turkey) Jessica Çarmıklı | 17 | 2 | 17 | 2 |
| 7 | FW | (Turkey) Setenay Sırım | 23 | 4 | 23 | 4 |
| 8 | MF | (Turkey) Altun Sancar | 0 | 0 | 0 | 0 |
| 9 | FW | (Namibia) Zenatha Coleman | 16 | 10 | 16 | 10 |
| 10 | MF | (Turkey) Fatma Kara Şahinbaş | 22 | 8 | 22 | 8 |
| 15 | MF | (United States) Erin Yenney | 25 | 6 | 25 | 6 |
| 16 | MF | (Turkey) Neslihan Aktaş | 4 | 0 | 4 | 0 |
| 17 | DF | (Turkey) Emine Yaren Çolak | 6 | 0 | 6 | 0 |
| 18 | MF | (Turkey) Songül Demirtürk | 6 | 0 | 6 | 0 |
| 19 | FW | (Trinidad and Tobago) Kennya Cordner | 25 | 34 | 25 | 34 |
| 20 | MF | (Turkey) Dilan Aslan | 1 | 0 | 1 | 0 |
| 21 | FW | (England) Shameeka Fishley | 23 | 23 | 23 | 23 |
| 23 | MF | (Turkey) Zeynep Ülkü Kahya | 13 | 1 | 13 | 1 |
| 24 | DF | (Turkey) Sevinç Çorlu | 12 | 0 | 12 | 0 |
| 25 | GK | (Turkey) Zeynep Akdeniz | 4 | 0 | 4 | 0 |
| 27 | MF | (Portugal) Mariana Jaleca | 20 | 5 | 20 | 5 |
| 28 | DF | (Turkey) Rabia Göksu Gökçe | 3 | 0 | 3 | 0 |
| 30 | DF | (Ivory Coast) Nina Kpaho | 25 | 4 | 25 | 4 |
| 36 | MF | (Turkey) Dilan Bora | 11 | 0 | 11 | 0 |
| 41 | DF | (Turkey) İlayda Cansu Kara | 21 | 2 | 21 | 2 |
| 80 | MF | (Turkey) Berdan Bozkurt | 17 | 3 | 17 | 3 |
| 98 | GK | (Turkey) Zuhal Ezer | 4 | 0 | 4 | 0 |

Last updated: 5 June 2022.
Source: TFF.org

=== Goalscorers ===
| Rank | No. | Pos. | Player | Süper Lig | Total |
|---|---|---|---|---|---|
| 1 | 19 | FW | (Trinidad and Tobago) Kennya Cordner | 34 | 34 |
| 2 | 21 | FW | (England) Shameeka Fishley | 23 | 23 |
| 3 | 9 | FW | (Namibia) Zenatha Coleman | 10 | 10 |
| 4 | 10 | MF | (Turkey) Fatma Kara Şahinbaş | 8 | 8 |
| 5 | 15 | MF | (United States) Erin Yenney | 6 | 6 |
| 6 | 27 | MF | (Portugal) Mariana Jaleca | 5 | 5 |
| 7 | 7 | FW | (Turkey) Setenay Sırım | 4 | 4 |
| 7 | 30 | DF | (Ivory Coast) Nina Kpaho | 4 | 4 |
| 9 | 5 | DF | (Turkey) Narin Yakut | 3 | 3 |
| 9 | 80 | MF | (Turkey) Berdan Bozkurt | 3 | 3 |
| 11 | 6 | DF | (Turkey) Jessica Çarmıklı | 2 | 2 |
| 11 | 41 | DF | (Turkey) İlayda Cansu Kara | 2 | 2 |
| 12 | 23 | MF | (Turkey) Zeynep Ülkü Kahya | 1 | 1 |
| Own goals | | | | 5 | 5 |
| Totals | | | | 110 | 110 |

Last updated: 5 June 2022.
Source: TFF.org

=== Assists ===
| Rank | No. | Pos. | Player | Süper Lig | Total |
|---|---|---|---|---|---|
| 1 | 19 | FW | (Trinidad and Tobago) Kennya Cordner | 2 | 2 |
| 2 | 21 | FW | (England) Shameeka Fishley | 1 | 1 |
| 2 | 30 | DF | (Ivory Coast) Nina Kpaho | 1 | 1 |
| Totals | | | | 4 | 4 |

Last updated: 5 June 2022.
Source: TFF.org

=== Cleansheets ===
| Rank | No. | Pos. | Player | Süper Lig | Total |
|---|---|---|---|---|---|
| 1 | 1 | GK | (Turkey) Ezgi Çağlar | 9 | 9 |
| 2 | 25 | GK | (Turkey) Zeynep Akdeniz | 1 | 1 |
| Totals | | | | 10 | 10 |

Last updated: 5 June 2022.
Source: TFF.org

=== Disciplinary records ===
| No. | Pos. | Player | Süper Lig | | | Total | | |
| No. | Pos. | Player | Booked | (yellow card) (yellow-red card) | Sent off (straight red) | Booked | (yellow card) (yellow-red card) | Sent off (straight red) |
|---|---|---|---|---|---|---|---|---|
| 10 | MF | (Turkey) Fatma Kara Şahinbaş | 5 | 0 | 0 | 5 | 0 | 0 |
| 4 | DF | (Turkey) Demet Bozkurt | 4 | 0 | 0 | 4 | 0 | 0 |
| 19 | FW | (Trinidad and Tobago) Kennya Cordner | 4 | 0 | 0 | 4 | 0 | 0 |
| 2 | DF | (Turkey) Sevinç Çorlu | 2 | 0 | 1 | 2 | 0 | 1 |
| 41 | DF | (Turkey) İlayda Cansu Kara | 2 | 0 | 0 | 2 | 0 | 0 |
| 21 | FW | (England) Shameeka Fishley | 2 | 0 | 0 | 2 | 0 | 0 |
| 1 | GK | (Turkey) Ezgi Çağlar | 2 | 0 | 0 | 2 | 0 | 0 |
| 6 | DF | (Turkey) Jessica Çarmıklı | 1 | 0 | 0 | 1 | 0 | 0 |
| 15 | MF | (United States) Erin Yenney | 1 | 0 | 0 | 1 | 0 | 0 |
| 23 | MF | (Turkey) Zeynep Ülkü Kahya | 1 | 0 | 0 | 1 | 0 | 0 |
| 4 | DF | (Turkey) Narin Yakut | 0 | 1 | 0 | 0 | 1 | 0 |
| 3 | DF | (Azerbaijan) Beyzanur Aslan | 0 | 0 | 1 | 0 | 0 | 1 |
| 28 | DF | (Turkey) Rabia Göksu Gökçe | 0 | 0 | 1 | 0 | 0 | 1 |
| Totals | | | 24 | 1 | 3 | 24 | 1 | 3 |

Last updated: 5 June 2022.
Source: TFF.org
