= 2021–22 in Turkish football =

Football in Turkey
- Season: 2021–22

Men's football
- Süper Lig: Trabzonspor
- First League: MKE Ankaragücü
- Turkish Cup: Sivasspor
- Turkish Super Cup: Beşiktaş

Women's football
- Women's Super League: ALG Spor

The 2021–22 season was the 117th season of competitive football in Turkey.

== Pre-season ==
League	Promoted to league	Relegated from league
Süper Lig	Adana Demirspor; Giresunspor; Altay	BB Erzurumspor; Ankaragücü; Gençlerbirliği; Denizlispor
1.Lig	Eyüpspor; Manisa; Kocaelispor	Akhisar Belediyespor; Ankaraspor; Eskişehirspor
2.Lig	Adıyaman; Bucaspor 1928; Diyarbekirspor; Isparta 32 SK; Nazilli Belediyespor; Somaspor	Elazığspor; Gümüşhanespor; Hacettepe; Kardemir Karabükspor; Mamak; Sancaktepe
3.Lig	Iğdır; Hendekspor; Kuşadasıspor; Orduspor 1967	1877 Alemdağspor; Antalya Kemerspor; Arhavispor; Cizre Spor; Çengelköy; Gölcükspor; Kozanspor; Manisaspor; Muğlaspor; Payasspor; Silivrispor; Sultanbeyli Belediyespor; Tekirdağspor; Tokatspor; Yalovaspor; Yozgatspor 1959

== League tables ==
=== Men's ===
==== Süper Lig ====
Pos	Team	Pld	W	D	L	GF	GA	GD	Pts	Qualification or relegation
1	Trabzonspor (C)	38	23	12	3	69	36	+33	81	Qualification for the Champions League play-off round
2	Fenerbahçe	38	21	10	7	73	38	+35	73	Qualification for the Champions League second qualifying round
3	Konyaspor	38	20	8	10	66	45	+21	68	Qualification for the Europa Conference League second qualifying round
4	İstanbul Başakşehir	38	19	8	11	56	36	+20	65	Qualification for the Europa Conference League second qualifying round
5	Alanyaspor	38	19	7	12	67	58	+9	64	
6	Beşiktaş	38	15	14	9	56	48	+8	59 (Note: Beşiktaş finished ahead of Antalyaspor on head-to-head points: Antalyaspor 2–3 Beşiktaş, Beşiktaş 0–0 Antalyaspor.)	
7	Antalyaspor	38	16	11	11	54	47	+7	59	
8	Fatih Karagümrük	38	16	9	13	47	52	−5	57	
9	Adana Demirspor	38	15	10	13	60	47	+13	55	
10	Sivasspor	38	14	12	12	52	50	+2	54	Qualification for the Europa League play-off round (Note: Sivasspor qualified for the Europa League play-off round as the 2021–22 Turkish Cup winners.)
11	Kasımpaşa	38	15	8	15	67	57	+10	53 (Note: Kasımpaşa finished ahead of Hatayspor on head-to-head points: Hatayspor 1–1 Kasımpaşa, Kasımpaşa 3–1 Hatayspor.)	
12	Hatayspor	38	15	8	15	56	60	−4	53	
13	Galatasaray	38	14	10	14	51	53	−2	52	
14	Kayserispor	38	12	11	15	54	61	−7	47	
15	Gaziantep	38	12	10	16	48	56	−8	46	
16	Giresunspor	38	12	9	17	41	47	−6	45	
17	Çaykur Rizespor (R)	38	10	6	22	44	71	−27	36	Relegation to TFF First League
18	Altay (R)	38	9	7	22	39	57	−18	34	Relegation to TFF First League
19	Göztepe (R)	38	7	7	24	40	77	−37	28	Relegation to TFF First League
20	Yeni Malatyaspor (R)	38	5	5	28	27	71	−44	20	Relegation to TFF First League

Source: Süper Lig
Rules for classification: 1) Points; 2) Head-to-head points; 3) Head-to-head goal difference; 4) Head-to-head goals scored; 5) Goal difference; 6) Goals scored; 7) Play-off.
(C) Champions; (R) Relegated

==== 1.Lig ====
Pos	Team	Pld	W	D	L	GF	GA	GD	Pts	Qualification or relegation
1	MKE Ankaragücü (C, P)	36	21	7	8	56	31	+25	70 (Note: MKE Ankaragücü is ahead of Ümraniyespor on head-to-head points: MKE Ankaragücü 4, Ümraniyespor 1.)	Promotion to the Süper Lig
2	Ümraniyespor (P)	36	21	7	8	64	37	+27	70	Promotion to the Süper Lig
3	Bandırmaspor	36	19	5	12	56	34	+22	62	Qualification for the Süper Lig Playoffs
4	İstanbulspor (O, P)	36	17	9	10	57	40	+17	60	Qualification for the Süper Lig Playoffs
5	BB Erzurumspor	36	16	10	10	55	44	+11	58	Qualification for the Süper Lig Playoffs
6	Eyüpspor	36	15	12	9	56	44	+12	57	Qualification for the Süper Lig Playoffs
7	Samsunspor	36	13	12	11	54	46	+8	51	
8	Boluspor	36	14	8	14	42	44	−2	50	
9	Manisa	36	14	7	15	45	44	+1	49 (Note: Head-to-head points: Manisa 12, Tuzlaspor 6, Denizlispor 0.)	
10	Tuzlaspor	36	13	10	13	45	44	+1	49	
11	Denizlispor	36	14	7	15	46	50	−4	49	
12	Ankara Keçiörengücü	36	13	9	14	45	47	−2	48	
13	Gençlerbirliği	36	14	6	16	44	54	−10	48	
14	Altınordu	36	14	3	19	45	62	−17	45 (Note: Altınordu is ahead of Adanaspor on head-to-head goal difference: Altınordu +1, Adanaspor –1.)	
15	Adanaspor	36	12	9	15	40	44	−4	45	
16	Kocaelispor (R)	36	12	8	16	40	49	−9	44	Relegation to the TFF Second League
17	Bursaspor (R)	36	12	8	16	43	53	−10	44	Relegation to the TFF Second League
18	Menemenspor (R)	36	8	14	14	42	57	−15	38	Relegation to the TFF Second League
19	Balıkesirspor (R)	36	3	3	30	26	77	−51	12	Relegation to the TFF Second League

Source: TFF
Rules for classification: 1) Points; 2) Head-to-head points; 3) Head-to-head goal difference; 4) Head-to-head goals scored; 5) Goal difference; 6) Goals scored
(C) Champions; (O) Play-off winners; (P) Promoted; (R) Relegated

=== Women's ===
==== Women's Super League ====
===== Group A =====
Pos	Team	Pld	W	D	L	GF	GA	GD	Pts	Qualification
1	Fenerbahçe	22	19	1	2	104	15	+89	58	Quarterfinals
2	Beşiktaş	22	19	0	3	104	18	+86	57	Quarterfinals
3	Fatih Vatan	22	15	2	5	45	19	+26	47	Quarterfinals
4	1207 Antalya	22	15	2	5	51	24	+27	47	Quarterfinals
5	Ankara BB Fomget	22	15	2	5	76	16	+60	47	
6	Kdz. Ereğli	22	12	2	8	50	34	+16	38	
7	Amed	22	8	1	13	30	51	−21	25	
8	Ataşehir	22	8	0	14	34	38	−4	24	
9	Altay	22	4	1	17	21	91	−70	13	Play-out
10	Hatayspor	22	3	3	16	20	62	−42	12	Play-out
11	Kocaeli (R)	22	3	1	18	27	104	−77	10	Play-out
12	Kireçburnu	22	2	3	17	14	104	−90	9	Play-out

Source: TFF.org
(R) Relegated

===== Group B =====
Pos	Team	Pld	W	D	L	GF	GA	GD	Pts	Qualification
1	ALG	22	19	2	1	93	3	+90	59	Quarterfinals
2	Fatih Karagümrük	22	16	4	2	52	14	+38	52	Quarterfinals
3	Konak	22	12	7	3	36	16	+20	43	Quarterfinals
4	Hakkari	22	13	4	5	46	18	+28	43	Quarterfinals
5	Adana	22	10	5	7	40	30	+10	35	
6	Galatasaray	22	8	5	9	35	31	+4	29	
7	Çaykur Rizespor	22	7	4	11	32	35	−3	25	
8	Trabzonspor	22	7	3	12	28	33	−5	24	
9	Sivasspor (R)	22	6	1	15	18	50	−32	19	Play-out
10	Dudullu	22	5	3	14	20	59	−39	18	Play-out
11	Kayseri (Note: Kayserispor had 3 points deducted) (R)	22	4	3	15	11	67	−56	12	Play-out
12	İlkadım (Note: İlkadım Belediyesi Yabancılar Pazarıspor had 3 points deducted) (R)	22	3	3	16	20	75	−55	9	Play-out

Source: TFF.org
(R) Relegated

===== Play-outs =====
Team 1	Agg.	Team 2	1st leg	2nd leg
Altay S.K.	3–1	İlkadım Belediyesi	1–0	2–1
Sivasspor	3–3 (p 5–6)	Kireçburnu Spor	1–1	2–2
Kocaeli Bayan FK	1–3	Dudullu Spor	1–1	0–2
Kayserispor	2–2 (p 3–6)	Hatayspor	2–0	0–2

===== Play-offs =====
Quarterfinals

Team 1	Agg.	Team 2	1st leg	2nd leg
Fenerbahçe S.K.	4–1	Hakkarigücü Spor	1–1	3–0
ALG Spor	5–0	1207 Antalya Spor	1–0	4–0
Beşiktaş J.K.	5–2	Konak Belediyespor	1–0	4–2
Fatih Vatan Spor	0–2	Fatih Karagümrük S.K.	0–0	0–2

Semifinals

Team 1	Agg.	Team 2	1st leg	2nd leg
Fenerbahçe S.K.	2–3	Fatih Karagümrük S.K.	0–1	2–2
ALG Spor	4–1	Beşiktaş J.K.	2–0	2–1

Final

Team 1	Score	Team 2
Fatih Karagümrük S.K.	1 - 2	ALG Spor

== Turkish Cup ==
=== Final ===
26 May 2022
20:45 TRT

Kayserispor	2–3 (a.e.t.)	Sivasspor
Civelek 33'; Parlak 107'	Report	Appindangoyé 60'; Gradel 95'; Konaté 113'

Atatürk Olimpiyat, Istanbul
Attendance: 27,798
Referee: Halil Umut Meler

== National team ==
=== Friendlies ===
29 March 2022 Friendly	Turkey	2–3	Italy	Konya, Turkey
21:45 TRT (UTC+03:00)	Ünder 4'; Dursun 83'	Report	Cristante 35'; Raspadori 39', 69'	Stadium: Konya Metropolitan Municipality Stadium; Attendance: 40,000; Referee: Enea Jorgji (Albania)

=== 2022 FIFA World Cup qualification ===
==== Group G ====
Pos	Team	Pld	W	D	L	GF	GA	GD	Pts	Qualification	Netherlands	Turkey	Norway	Montenegro	Latvia	Gibraltar
1	Netherlands	10	7	2	1	33	8	+25	23	Qualification for 2022 FIFA World Cup	—	6–1	2–0	4–0	2–0	6–0
2	Turkey	10	6	3	1	27	16	+11	21	Advance to play-offs	4–2	—	1–1	2–2	3–3	6–0
3	Norway	10	5	3	2	15	8	+7	18		1–1	0–3	—	2–0	0–0	5–1
4	Montenegro	10	3	3	4	14	15	−1	12		2–2	1–2	0–1	—	0–0	4–1
5	Latvia	10	2	3	5	11	14	−3	9		0–1	1–2	0–2	1–2	—	3–1
6	Gibraltar	10	0	0	10	4	43	−39	0		0–7	0–3	0–3	0–3	1–3	—

Source: FIFA, UEFA
Rules for classification: Tiebreakers

1 September 2021 WCQ2022 UEFA Group G	Turkey	2–2	Montenegro	Istanbul, Turkey
21:45 TRT (UTC+03:00)	Ünder 9'; Yazıcı 31'	Report	Marušić 40'; Radunović 90+7'	Stadium: Vodafone Park; Attendance: 12,472; Referee: Benoît Bastien (France)

4 September 2021 WCQ2022 UEFA Group G	Gibraltar	0–3	Turkey	Gibraltar
20:45 CEST (UTC+02:00)		Report	Dervişoğlu 54'; Çalhanoğlu 65'; Karaman 83'	Stadium: Victoria Stadium; Attendance: 702; Referee: Kristo Tohver (Estonia)

7 September 2021 WCQ2022 UEFA Group G	Netherlands	6–1	Turkey	Amsterdam, Netherlands
20:45 CEST (UTC+02:00)	Klaassen 1'; Depay 16', 38' (pen.), 54'; Til 80'; Malen 90'	Report	Ünder 90+2'	Stadium: Johan Cruyff Arena; Attendance: 31,389; Referee: Daniele Orsato (Italy)

8 October 2021 WCQ2022 UEFA Group G	Turkey	1–1	Norway	Istanbul, Turkey
21:45 TRT (UTC+03:00)	Aktürkoğlu 6'	Report	Thorstvedt 41'	Stadium: Şükrü Saracoğlu Stadium; Attendance: 21,408; Referee: Felix Brych (Germany)

11 October 2021 WCQ2022 UEFA Group G	Latvia	1–2	Turkey	Riga, Latvia
20:45 EEST (UTC+03:00)	Demiral 70' (o.g.)	Report	Dursun 76'; B. Yılmaz 90+9' (pen.)	Stadium: Daugava Stadium; Attendance: 2,453; Referee: Andreas Ekberg (Sweden)

13 November 2021 WCQ2022 UEFA Group G	Turkey	6–0	Gibraltar	Istanbul, Turkey
20:00 TRT (UTC+03:00)	Aktürkoğlu 11'; Dervişoğlu 38', 41'; Demiral 65'; Dursun 81'; Müldür 85'	Report (FIFA); Report (UEFA)		Stadium: Başakşehir Fatih Terim Stadium; Attendance: 8,895; Referee: Serhiy Boyko (Ukraine)

16 November 2021 WCQ2022 UEFA Group G	Montenegro	1–2	Turkey	Podgorica, Montenegro
20:45 CET (UTC+01:00)	Bećiraj 4'	Report (FIFA); Report (UEFA)	Aktürkoğlu 22'; Kökçü 60'	Stadium: Podgorica City Stadium; Attendance: 2,885; Referee: Daniel Siebert (Germany)

==== Second round ====
24 March 2022 2022 FIFA World Cup qualifying	Portugal	3–1	Turkey	Porto, Portugal
19:45 WET (UTC±00:00)	Otávio 15'; Jota 42'; Nunes 90+4'	Report	B. Yılmaz 65'	Stadium: Estádio do Dragão; Attendance: 48,010; Referee: Daniel Siebert (Germany)

== Turkish clubs in Europe ==
=== UEFA Champions League ===
==== Second qualifying round ====
Team 1	Agg.	Team 2	1st leg	2nd leg
PSV Eindhoven (Netherlands)	7–2	(Turkey) Galatasaray	5–1	2–1

==== Group stage ====
===== Group C =====
Pos	Team	Pld	W	D	L	GF	GA	GD	Pts	Qualification	AJX	SPO	DOR	BES
1	(Netherlands) Ajax	6	6	0	0	20	5	+15	18	Advance to knockout phase	—	4–2	4–0	2–0
2	(Portugal) Sporting CP	6	3	0	3	14	12	+2	9 (Note: Tied on head-to-head points. Head-to-head goal difference: Sporting CP +1, Borussia Dortmund −1.)	Advance to knockout phase	1–5	—	3–1	4–0
3	(Germany) Borussia Dortmund	6	3	0	3	10	11	−1	9	Transfer to Europa League	1–3	1–0	—	5–0
4	(Turkey) Beşiktaş	6	0	0	6	3	19	−16	0		1–2	1–4	1–2	—

Source: UEFA

=== UEFA Europa League ===
==== Third qualifying round ====
Team 1	Agg.	Team 2	1st leg	2nd leg
Galatasaray (Turkey)	5–3	(Scotland) St Johnstone	1–1	4–2

==== Play-off round ====
Team 1	Agg.	Team 2	1st leg	2nd leg
Randers (Denmark)	2–3	(Turkey) Galatasaray	1–1	1–2
Fenerbahçe (Turkey)	6–2	(Finland) HJK	1–0	5–2

==== Group stage ====
===== Group D =====
Pos	Team	Pld	W	D	L	GF	GA	GD	Pts	Qualification	FRA	OLY	FEN	ANT
1	(Germany) Eintracht Frankfurt	6	3	3	0	10	6	+4	12	Advance to round of 16	—	3–1	1–1	2–2
2	(Greece) Olympiacos	6	3	0	3	8	7	+1	9	Advance to knockout round play-offs	1–2	—	1–0	2–1
3	(Turkey) Fenerbahçe	6	1	3	2	7	8	−1	6	Transfer to Europa Conference League	1–1	0–3	—	2–2
4	(Belgium) Antwerp	6	1	2	3	6	10	−4	5		0–1	1–0	0–3	—

Source: UEFA

===== Group E =====
Pos	Team	Pld	W	D	L	GF	GA	GD	Pts	Qualification	GAL	LAZ	MAR	LOK
1	(Turkey) Galatasaray	6	3	3	0	7	3	+4	12	Advance to round of 16	—	1–0	4–2	1–1
2	(Italy) Lazio	6	2	3	1	7	3	+4	9	Advance to knockout round play-offs	0–0	—	0–0	2–0
3	(France) Marseille	6	1	4	1	6	7	−1	7	Transfer to Europa Conference League	0–0	2–2	—	1–0
4	(Russia) Lokomotiv Moscow	6	0	2	4	2	9	−7	2		0–1	0–3	1–1	—

Source: UEFA

==== Knockout stage ====
===== Round of 16 =====
Team 1	Agg.	Team 2	1st leg	2nd leg
Barcelona (Spain)	2–1	(Turkey) Galatasaray	0–0	2–1

=== UEFA Europa Conference League ===
==== Qualifying phase and play-off round ====
===== Second qualifying round =====
Team 1	Agg.	Team 2	1st leg	2nd leg
Petrocub Hîncești (Moldova)	0–2	(Turkey) Sivasspor	0–1	0–1

===== Third qualifying round =====
Team 1	Agg.	Team 2	1st leg	2nd leg
Dinamo Batumi (Georgia (country))	2–3	(Turkey) Sivasspor	1–2	1–1 (a.e.t.)
Trabzonspor (Turkey)	4–4 (4–3 p)	(Norway) Molde	3–3	1–1 (a.e.t.)

===== Play-off round =====
Team 1	Agg.	Team 2	1st leg	2nd leg
Sivasspor (Turkey)	1–7	(Denmark) Copenhagen	1–2	0–5
Trabzonspor (Turkey)	1–5	(Italy) Roma	1–2	0–3

==== Knockout stage ====
===== Knockout round play-offs =====
Team 1	Agg.	Team 2	1st leg	2nd leg
Fenerbahçe (Turkey)	4–6	(Czech Republic) Slavia Prague	2–3	2–3
