= Aminata Haidara =

Ivorian footballer (born 1997)

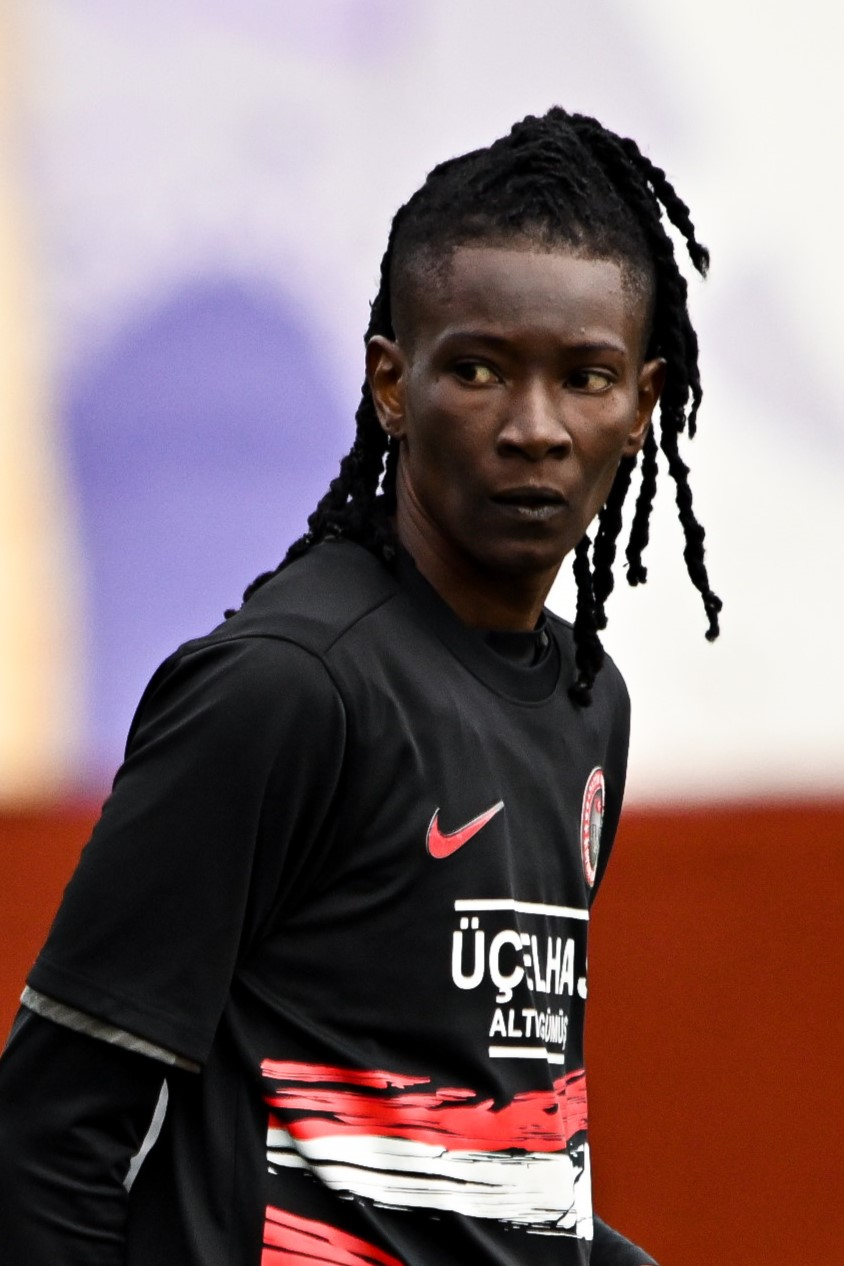
- Aminata Haidara of Fatih Vatan Spor in the 2023-24 Turkish Women's Football Super League

Personal information
- Full name: Aminata Haidara
- Date of birth: 13 May 1997 (age 29)
- Place of birth: Ouragahio, Gagnoa, Ivory Coast
- Height: 1.75 m (5 ft 9 in)
- Position: Midfielder

Team information
- Current team: Yüksekova
- Number: 99

Senior career*
Years	Team	Apps	(Gls)
2014–2015	Onze Sœurs de Gagnoa		
2019-020	FK Niva-Belcard Grodno	36	(4)
2022–2023	Hatayspor	13	(0)
2023–2024	Fatih Vatan	29	(1)
2024–2025	ALGn	23	(0)
2025	Fatih Vatan	8	(0)
2025–2026	Beşiktaş	16	(1)
2026–	Yüksekova	10	(2)

International career^{‡}
	Ivory Coast	4	(0)
- * Club domestic league appearances and goals as of 22 September 2024 ‡ National team caps and goals as of 11:59, 16 June 2015 (UTC)

Aminata Haidara (born 13 May 1997) is an Ivorian professional women's football midfielder who plays for Yüksekova in the Turkish Super League. She was part of the Ivorian squad for the 2015 FIFA Women's World Cup.

== Club career ==
Haidara was a member of Onze Sœurs de Gagnoa in 2014–15.

She played two seasons in 2019 and 2020 for FK Niva-Belcard Grodno in the Belarusian Premier League and the Belarusian Women's Cup.

In October 2022, she moved to Turkey, and signed with Hatayspor to play in the 2022–23 Women's Super League.

She transferred to the Istanbul-based club Fatih Vatan in the second half of the season. She remained in the club the next season. For the 2024–25 Turkish Super League season, she moved to Gaziantep and joined ALG.

== International career ==
As a member of the Ivory Coast national team, Haidara took part at the 2015 FIFA Women's World Cup.

== See also ==
- List of Ivory Coast women's international footballers
