= Jessica O'Rourke =

Association football player

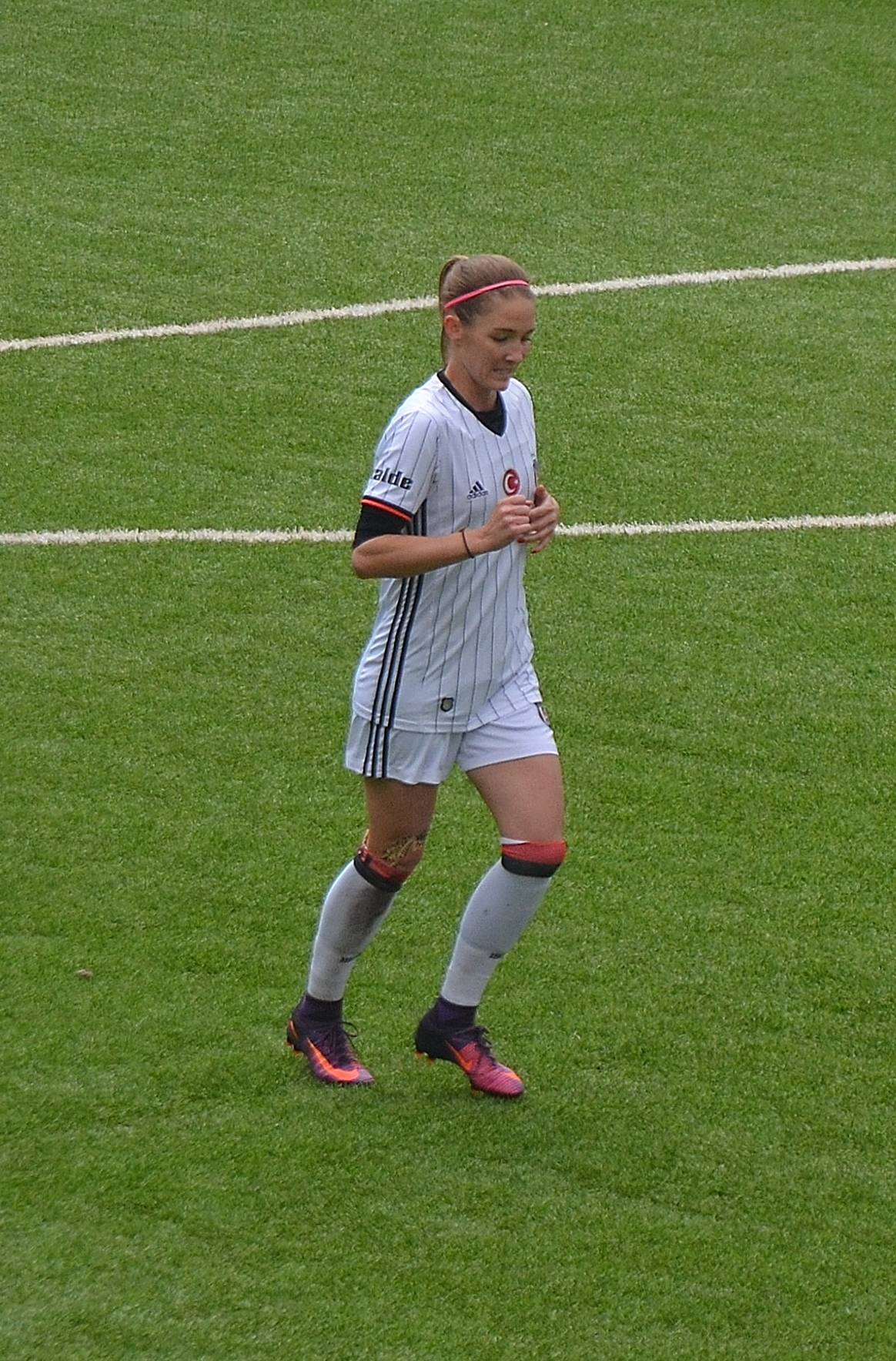
- Jessica O'Rourke (2016–17 season)

Personal information
- Full name: Jessica Lynne O'Rourke Çarmıklı
- Birth name: Jessica Lynne O'Rourke
- Date of birth: 3 January 1986 (age 40)
- Place of birth: Philadelphia, Pennsylvania, U.S.
- Height: 1.70 m (5 ft 7 in)
- Positions: Midfielder; defender

Youth career
- 1999–2004: Medford Strikers Scream
- 2000–2003: Cherokee High School Lady Chiefs
- 2001–2004: New Jersey State ODP Team

College career
Years	Team	Apps	(Gls)
2004–2007	NC State Wolfpack		

Senior career*
Years	Team	Apps	(Gls)
2005	Carolina Dynamo	5	(1)
2007	New Jersey Wildcats	7	(2)
2008	F.C. Indiana	12	(3)
2009	Chicago Red Stars	0	(0)
2009	Buffalo Flash	16	(3)
2009	Sporting de Huelva	16	(0)
2010	Zvezda 2005 Perm	18	(1)
2016–2017	Beşiktaş	19	(2)
2019–2021	Beşiktaș	16	(2)
2022	Fenerbahçe	17	(2)
Total		109	(16)

International career
2020	Turkey	1	(0)
- * Club domestic league appearances and goals

Jessica Lynne O'Rourke Çarmıklı (née O'Rourke; born 3 January 1986) is a professional football manager and former player who played as a midfielder and a defender. Born in the United States, she represented Turkey internationally.

== Early life ==
O'Rourke was raised in the Marlton section of Evesham Township, New Jersey, and attended Cherokee High School.

== Club career ==
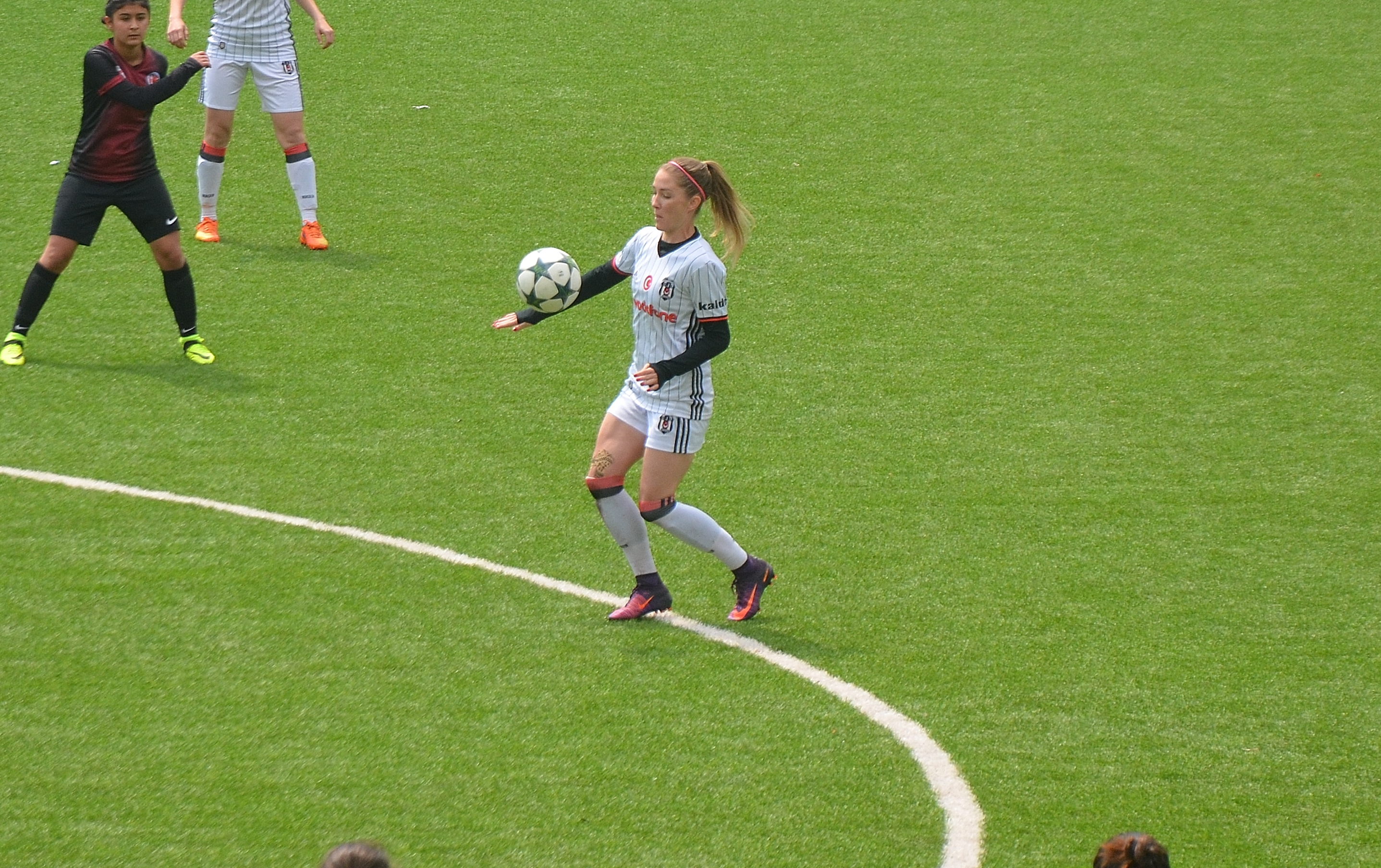
Jessica O'Rourke playing for beşiktaş J.K. in the 2016–17 season's play-off home match against 1207 Antalya Döşemealtı Belediyespor.

Jessica started her professional career in 2008 with the only professional team in the US at that time, the F.C. Indiana Lionesses. She played a significant role as a defensive midfielder for F.C. Indiana as they won USL W-League Central Conference in 2008; advancing to the Championship Finals where she tallied the only goal for the Lionesses in the 47'.

On January 16, 2009, she was drafted by the Chicago Red Stars of Women's Professional Soccer (WPS) with the 2nd pick of the 9th Round (58th overall).

In 2009, she competed in the United Soccer Leagues' W-League as team Vice Captain for the Buffalo Flash; then played in the Spanish Superliga Femenina with the Club Cajasol Sporting de Huelva.

For the 2010/2011 season, she joined the club Zvezda-2005 in the Russian Women's Football Championship league and the UEFA Women's Champions League.

In November 2016, Jessica signed with the Istanbul-based club Beşiktaş to play in the Turkish Women's First Football League. After an 18-month absence for maternity, she returned with Beşiktaş J.K. and took part in the first appearance of the club in the 2019–20 UEFA Women's Champions League - Group 9 matches; scoring her first goal in Champions League play against Alashkert in the 87th minute.

On September 3, 2021, Fenerbahçe announced technical staff, with Jessica Çarmıklı being announced as administrative manager. On January 8, 2022, Fenerbahçe announced that she would be on the field as a footballer for the club for the rest of the season.

== International career ==
By September 2020, O'Rourke Çarmıklı was called up to the Turkey women's national football team to play at the UEFA Women's Euro 2021 qualifying Group A matches. She wore the Turkish national jersey for the first time as she was naturalized through her marriage to a Turkish person. She played at the away match against Kosovo in Antalya on 23 October 2020.

== Career statistics ==
As of match played 5 June 2022.

Club	Season	League			Continental		National		Total	
Club	Season	Division	Apps	Goals	Apps	Goals	Apps	Goals	Apps	Goals
Beşiktaş	2016–17	First League	19	2	–	–	–	–	19	2
Beşiktaş	2019–20	First League	10	2	1	0	–	–	11	2
Beşiktaş	2020–21	First League	6	0	0	0	1	0	7	0
Beşiktaş	Total		35	4	1	0	1	0	37	4
Fenerbahçe	2021–22	Super League	17	2	–	–	0	0	17	2
Fenerbahçe	Total		17	2	–	–	0	0	17	2

== Honours ==
Turkish Women's First Football League
Beşiktaş

Winners (1): 2020–21
Runners-up (1): 2016–17

== Personal life ==
O'Rourke has resided in Turkey since 2010 and has settled in Istanbul. She is married to Turkish businessman Oğuzhan Çarmıklı. They have two children.
