= Khatia Tchkonia =

Georgian football player (born 1989)

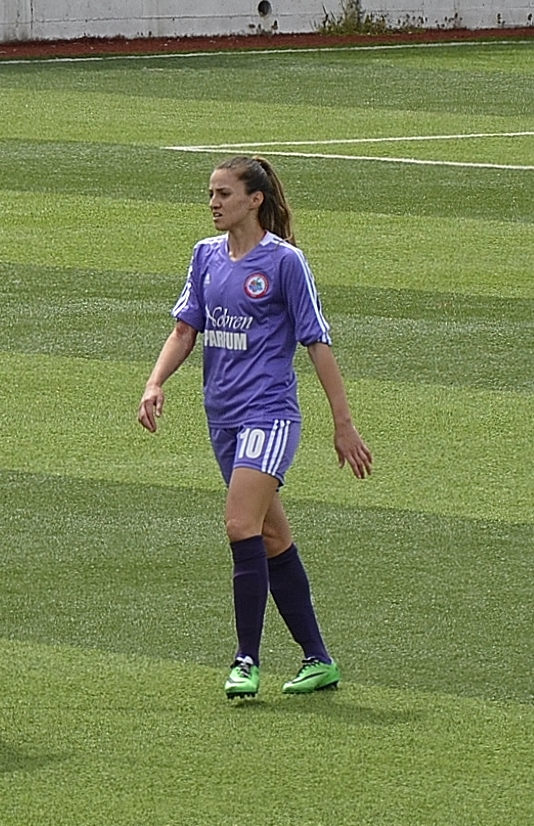
- Khatia Tchkonia for Kdz. Ereğlispor in the 2013–14 season.

Personal information
- Date of birth: 16 October 1989 (age 37)
- Place of birth: Tbilisi, Soviet Union (now Georgia)
- Position: Midfielder

Senior career*
Years	Team	Apps	(Gls)
- FC Dinamo Tbilisi
2009–2010	Trabzonspor	17	(9)
2010–2012	Trabzon İdmanocağı	51	(34)
2013–2016	Kdz. Ereğlispor	55	(31)
2017	Ataşehir Belediyespor	21	(7)
2018	İlkadım Belediyespor	11	(5)
2018–2019	Konak Belediyespor	13	(1)
2019–2022	WFC Lanchkhuti		
2023	Hatayspor	3	(0)

International career^{‡}
2010–	Georgia	6	(1)
- * Club domestic league appearances and goals as of 5 February 2023 ‡ National team caps and goals as of 8 March 2011

Khatia Tchkonia, (Georgian: ხატია ჭყონია, born 16 October 1989) is a Georgian women's football midfielder, who lately played in the Turkish Women's Super League for Hatayspor with jersey number 9. She is a member of the Georgia women's national football team since 2010.

== Club career ==
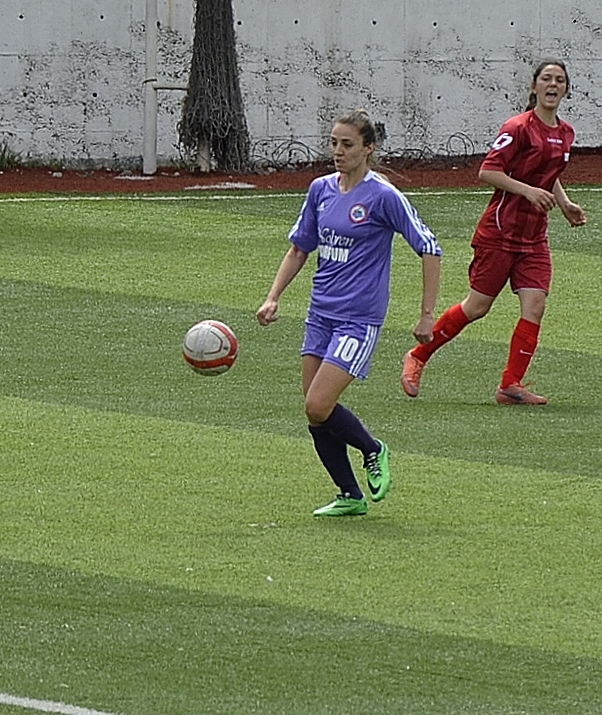
Khatia Tchkonia (lila) playing for Kdz. Ereğlispor in the 2013–14 away match against Ataşehir Belediyespor.

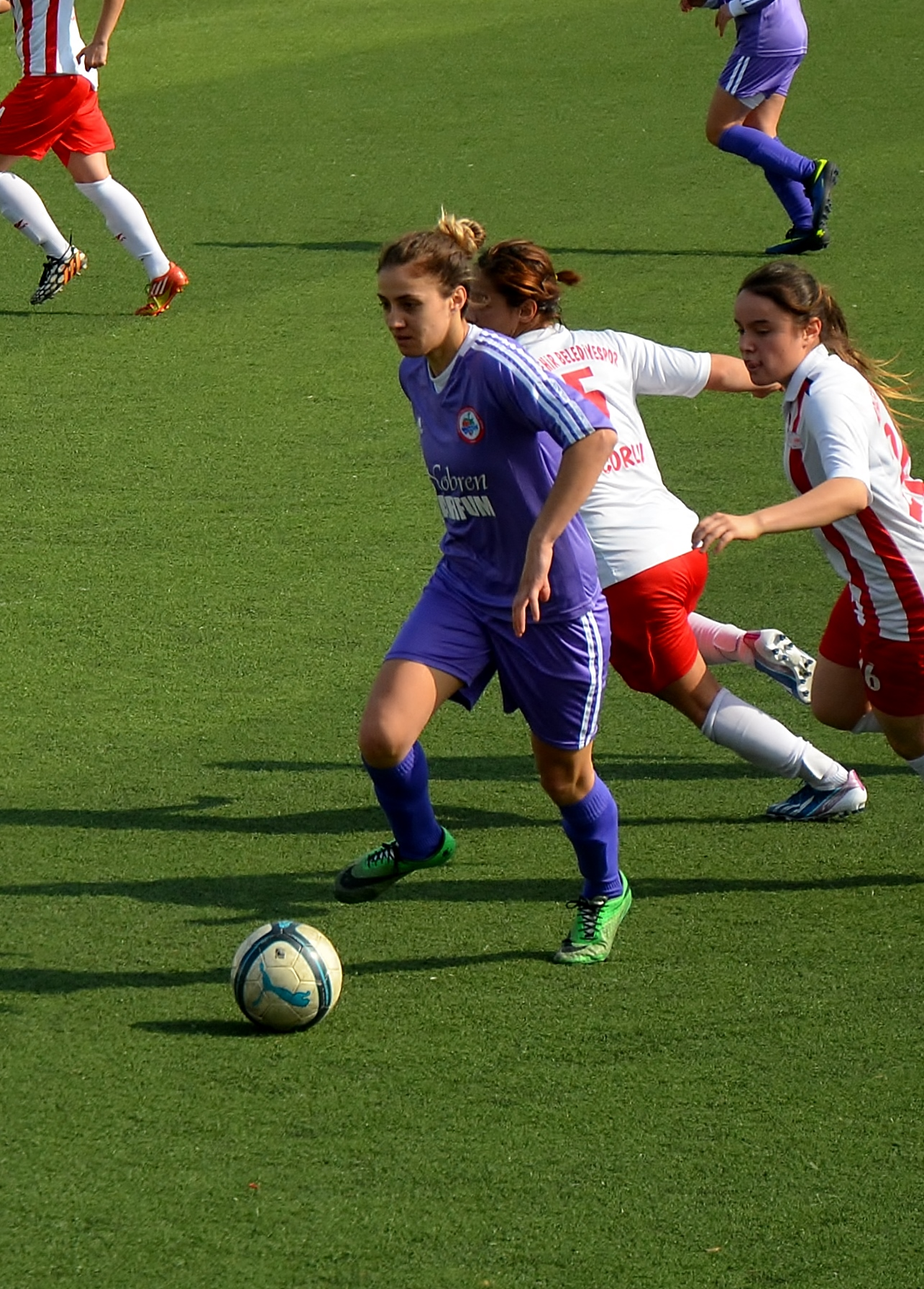
Khatia Tchkonia (lila) driving the ball for Kdz. Ereğlispor in the 2014–15 away match against Ataşehir Belediyespor.

Khatia Tchkonia played in her hometown club FC Dinamo Tbilisi. She made her first international appearance at the 2007–08 UEFA Women's Cup Group A7 matches. She netted two goals against the Serbian team ŽFK Napredak Kruševac.

She joined the Turkish club Trabzonspor July 16, 2009 right before the qualification matches of the 2009–10 UEFA Women's Champions League. She scored a goal in her first match in the tournament against the Slovene team ŽNK Krka. She participated also in the two following matches. After playing one season and scoring nine goals in 17 league matches, she transferred the rival team Trabzon İdmanocağı in the same city. She played three seasons capping 51 times and netting 34 goals. For the 2012–13 season, she moved to another Black Sea club, Kdz. Ereğlispor, where she continues to play. She transferred to the Istanbul-based club Ataşehr Belediyespor in the second half of the 2016–17 season.

On January 4, 2018, Tchkonia transferred to İlkadım Belediyesi.

After relegation of her club to the Second League, she left her club, and transferred to the İzmir-based club Konak Belediyespor in the 2018–19 First League season.

On 2 July 2019, Tchkonia left her club Konak Belediyespor, and returned to her country to join WFC Lanchkhuti. In January 2023, she moved again to Turkey, and joined Hatayspor to play in the second half of the 2022–23 Super League. On 10 March 2023, she left Turkey for home as her team suffered from the earthquake in Turkey, which took place on 6 February 2023.

== International career ==
Tchkonia debuted in the Georgia women's national team playing at the 2011 FIFA Women's World Cup qualification – UEFA Group 3 match against Greece on April 15, 2010, and appeared also in the match against the Bulgarian women. She participated at the UEFA Women's Euro 2013 qualifying matches against Malta, Armenia and Faroe Islands. She was called up to play at the 2015 FIFA Women's World Cup qualification (UEFA) – Group 2 matches. She played in the group against Lithuania, Montenegro and Faroe Islands, and scored one goal.

== Career statistics ==
As of 5 February 2023.

Club	Season	League			Continental		National		Total	
Club	Season	Division	Apps	Goals	Apps	Goals	Apps	Goals	Apps	Goals
Trabzonspor	2009–10	First League	17	9	3	1			20	10
Trabzonspor	Total		17	9	3	1			20	10
Trabzon İdmanocağı	2010–11	First League	21	19	–	–	3	0	24	19
Trabzon İdmanocağı	2011–12	First League	21	15	–	–			21	15
Trabzon İdmanocağı	2012–13	First League	9	0	–	–	3	1	10	1
Trabzon İdmanocağı	Total		51	34			6	1	57	35
Kdz. Ereğlispor	2012–13	First League	7	5	–	–			7	5
Kdz. Ereğlispor	2013–14	First League	17	4	–	–			17	4
Kdz. Ereğlispor	2014–15	First League	14	7	–	–			14	7
Kdz. Ereğlispor	2015–16	First League	17	15	–	–			17	15
Kdz. Ereğlispor	Total		55	31	–	–	0	0	55	31
Ataşehir Belediyespor	2016–17	First League	17	7	–	–	0	0	17	7
Ataşehir Belediyespor	2017–18	First League	4	0	–	–	0	0	4	0
Ataşehir Belediyespor	Total		21	7	–	–	0	0	21	7
İlkadım Belediyespor	2017–18	First League	11	5	–	–	0	0	11	5
Konak Belediyespor	2018–19	First League	13	1	–	–	0	0	13	1
Hatayspor	2022–23	Super League	3	0	–	–	0	0	3	0
Career total			171	87	3	1	6	1	180	89

== International goals ==
No.	Date	Venue	Opponent	Score	Result	Competition
1.	9 April 2015	Centenary Stadium, Ta'Qali, Malta	Andorra	4–0	7–0	UEFA Women's Euro 2017 qualifying
2.	9 April 2015	Centenary Stadium, Ta'Qali, Malta	Andorra	5–0	7–0	UEFA Women's Euro 2017 qualifying
3.	9 April 2015	Centenary Stadium, Ta'Qali, Malta	Andorra	6–0	7–0	UEFA Women's Euro 2017 qualifying
4.	9 April 2015	Centenary Stadium, Ta'Qali, Malta	Andorra	7–0	7–0	UEFA Women's Euro 2017 qualifying
5.	8 April 2017	Mikheil Meskhi Stadium, Tbilisi, Georgia	Estonia	1–0	2–1	2019 FIFA Women's World Cup qualification
6.	14 June 2019	Davit Petriashvili Stadium, Tbilisi, Georgia	United Arab Emirates	2–0	5–1	Friendly
7.	14 June 2019	Davit Petriashvili Stadium, Tbilisi, Georgia	United Arab Emirates	3–0	5–1	Friendly
8.	5 March 2020	Centenary Stadium, Ta' Qali, Malta	Malta	1–2	1–2	UEFA Women's Euro 2022 qualifying
9.	13 July 2023	Mikheil Meskhi Stadium, Tbilisi, Georgia	Armenia	3–0	5–0	Friendly
10.	1 December 2023	Mikheil Meskhi Stadium, Tbilisi, Georgia	Luxembourg	2–2	4–2	2023–24 UEFA Women's Nations League

== Honours ==
Turkish Women's First Football League

Trabzonspor
Winners (1): 2009–10

Kdz. ereğlispor
Third places (1): 2012–13

Ataşehir Belediyespor
Third places (1): 2016–17

Konak Belediyespor
Third places (1): 2018–19

WFC Lanchkhuti
Winners (1): 2021
