= İlayda Cansu Kara =

Turkish women's footballer (born 2005)

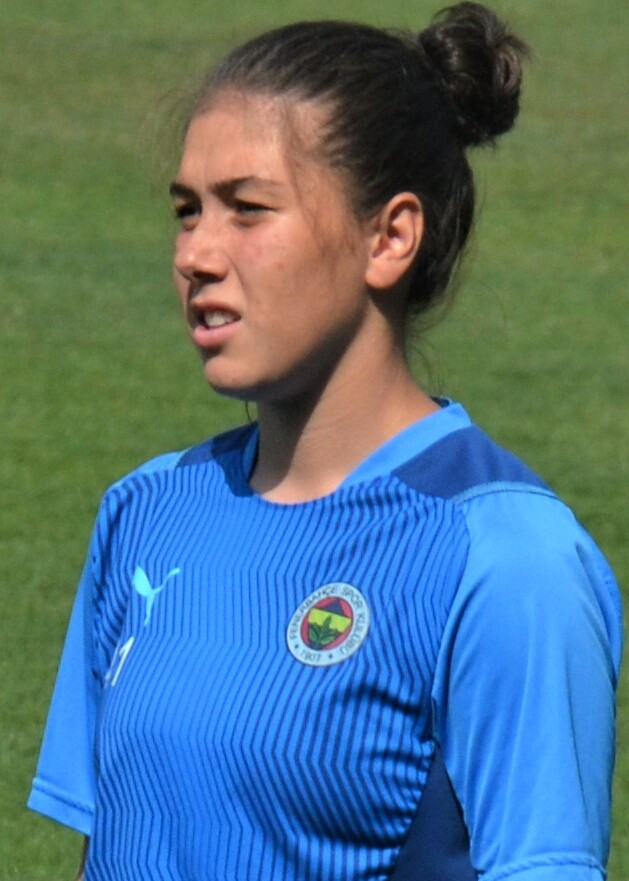

Personal information
- Date of birth: 28 April 2005 (age 21)
- Place of birth: Derince, Turkey
- Position: Defender

Team information
- Current team: Fenerbahçe S.K.
- Number: 3

Youth career
- 2017–2021: Kocaeli Bayan FK

Senior career*
Years	Team	Apps	(Gls)
2021–	Fenerbahçe S.K.	56	(6)

International career^{‡}
2019–2022	Turkey U-17	7	(0)
2022–2024	Turkey U-19	15	(4)
2024–	Turkey		
- * Club domestic league appearances and goals as of 5 May 2024 ‡ National team caps and goals as of 9 April 2024

İlayda Cansu Kara (born 28 April 2005) is a Turkish women's football defender who plays in the Turkish Women's Football Super League for Fenerbahçe S.K. She was part of the girls' national U-17 and women's national U-19 teams. She is a member of the Turkey women's team.

== Early years in sport ==
Kara started performing taekwondo already in the first grade of her primary school. The next year, she switched over to football after one day she returned home crying. She accompanied her football coach father to trainings.

On 15 April 2015, she obtained her license from Körfez Bld. Hereke Yıldızspor, which her father was coaching. She joined the local club Harb-İş Spor, and later moved to Kocaeli Bayan FK in 2017, where she was a member of the youth team until 2021 without having a chance to be promoted to the A-team.

== Club career ==
On 22 September 2021, Kara signed a deal with the newly established Istanbul-based club Fenerbahçe S.K. to play in the 2021-22 Turkish Women's Football Super League season. Her team reached the semi-finals in the 2021–22 season, and became the runners-up in the 2022-23 Super League season.

The center-back player is left-footed.

== International career ==
=== Turkey girls' U-17 ===
Kara played for the first time for Turkey girls' U-17 team in the friendly match on 21 November 2019 against Russia. She played in seven matches, among them three at the 2022 UEFA Women's Under-17 Championship qualification.

=== Turkey women's U-19 ===
On 14 September 2022, she debuted in the Turkey women's U-19 team in the friendly match against Azerbaijan. She participated in six matches at the 2023 UEFA Women's Under-19 Championship qualification and in two games at the 2024 UEFA Women's Under-19 Championship qualification. She scored four goals in a total of fifteen matches.

=== Turkey women's ===
Kara was selected to the Turkey women's national team for the first time in July 2023. In 2024, she was called up again to play at the UEFA Women's Euro 2025 qualifying League B matches.

== Career statistics ==
As of 5 June 2024

Club	Season	League			Continental		National		Total	
Club	Season	Division	Apps	Goals	Apps	Goals	Apps	Goals	Apps	Goals
Kocaeli Bayan	2019–2021				-	-	2	0	2	0
Kocaeli Bayan	Total				–	–	2	0	2	0
Fenerbahçe	2021–22	Super League	21	2	–	–	5	0	26	2
Fenerbahçe	2022–23	Super League	18	3	–	–	8	2	26	5
Fenerbahçe	2023–24	Super Leagu3	17	1	–	–	7	2	24	3
Fenerbahçe	Total		56	6	–	–	20	4	76	10
Career total			56	6	–	–	22	4	78	10

== Personal life ==
İlayda Cansu Kara was born to Gülşen and Bülent Ecevit Kara in Derince, Kocaeli, Turkey on 28 April 2005. Her father is a former footballer, and works as the head coach of the local football club Hereke Yıldızspor. She has a four-year-older sister, Göksu, and a four-year-younges brother, Kerem.

She graduated from the Merter Final Schools in Istanbul, to which she had transferred from her hometown in the 11th grade, when she joined Fenerbahçe S.K. She is a student in the School of Physical Education and Sports at Fenerbahçe University.

== Honours ==
Turkish Super League

Fenerbahçe S.K.
Runners-up (1): 2022-23,
