= Shameeka Fishley =

English footballer

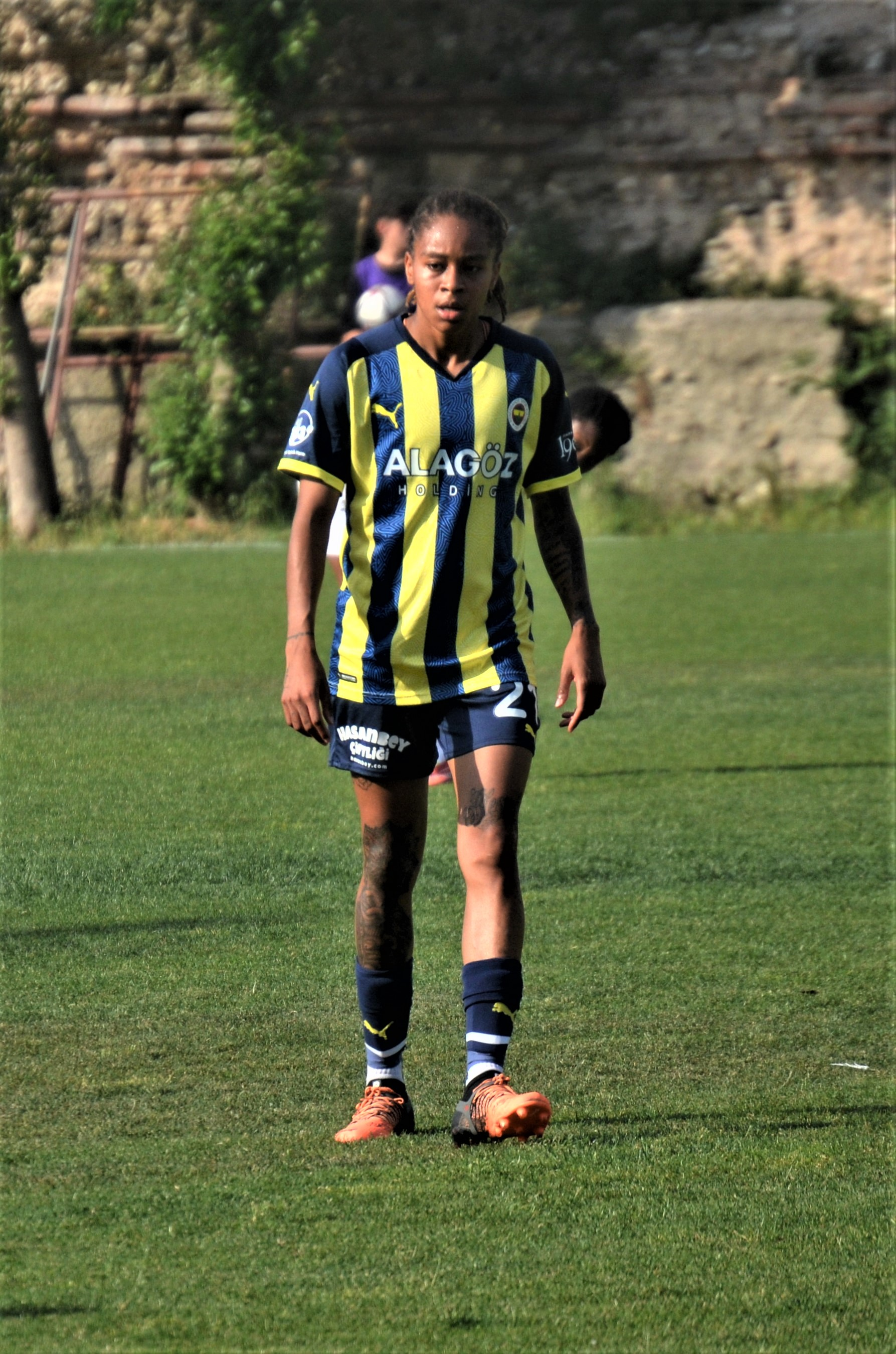
- Shameeka Fishle of Fenerbahçe (May 2022)

Personal information
- Full name: Shameeka Nikoda Fishley
- Date of birth: 19 September 1993 (age 33)
- Place of birth: Leeds, England
- Height: 1.75 m (5 ft 9 in)
- Position: Forward

Youth career
- Leeds United
- Seacroft Colts
- Huddersfield Town
- Leeds City Vixens
- 2011–2013: Chelsea

College career
Years	Team	Apps	(Gls)
2013–2016	Davenport Panthers	62	(32)

Senior career*
Years	Team	Apps	(Gls)
2016	Detroit Lions		
2017	Sindri	17	(6)
2017–2018	AGSM Verona	22	(3)
2018	İBV	14	(3)
2018–2019	Sassuolo	7	(1)
2019–2020	Stjarnan	22	(8)
2020–2021	Logroño	7	(0)
2021–2022	Fenerbahçe	20	(22)
2022–2023	Ferencvárosi	8	(9)
2023–2023	Bordeaux	12	(1)
2023–2025	Beşiktaş	26	(12)
- * Club domestic league appearances and goals as of 13 October 2025

Shameeka Nikoda Fishley (born 19 September 1993) is an English footballer who plays as a forward

== Early life ==
Shameeka Nikoda Fishley was born to Tracey Fishley in Leeds, England, on 19 September 1993.

She attended St Augustine's Catholic Primary School in Leeds in 2005 and completed her high school education in 2010. Between 2010 and 2012, she studied Sports Development, Coaching and Fitness at Merrist Wood College, England. In May 2011, she obtained an FA Coaching Diploma Level 1 from The Football Association, which is equivalent to a UEFA Pro Licence.

She then went to the United States, where she was educated in Personnel Administration in Human Resources Management at Davenport University in Michigan between 2013 and 2017.

== Playing career ==
Fishley began playing football during her high school years. She was with Leeds United Women F.C. U14, Seacroft Colts AFC U16, Huddersfield Town A.F.C. and Leeds City Vixens before she entered the youth academy team of Chelsea in 2011, where she played until 2013. She was with Davenport Panthers in the United States, She then played for the Icelandic club İB Vestmannaeyja in 2018, with the Italian A.S.D. AGSM Verona in 2017–18, and U.S. Sassuolo Calcio in the 2018–19 season, with UMF Stjarnan in Iceland again between 2019 and 2021, and with the Spanish EdF Logroño in 2021. In November 2021, she moved to Turkey and signed with the newly established team Fenerbahçe.

She scored a hat trick in her first game with Fenerbahçe against archrivals Galatasaray that was the first match of both newly established teams. The friendly match was played under the motto "End Violence Against Women" (Turkish: Kadına Şiddete Son) before the start of the 2021-22 Turkcell Women's Football Super League. It ended 7–0 for Fenerbahçe.
