= Erin Yenney =

American soccer player (born 1992)

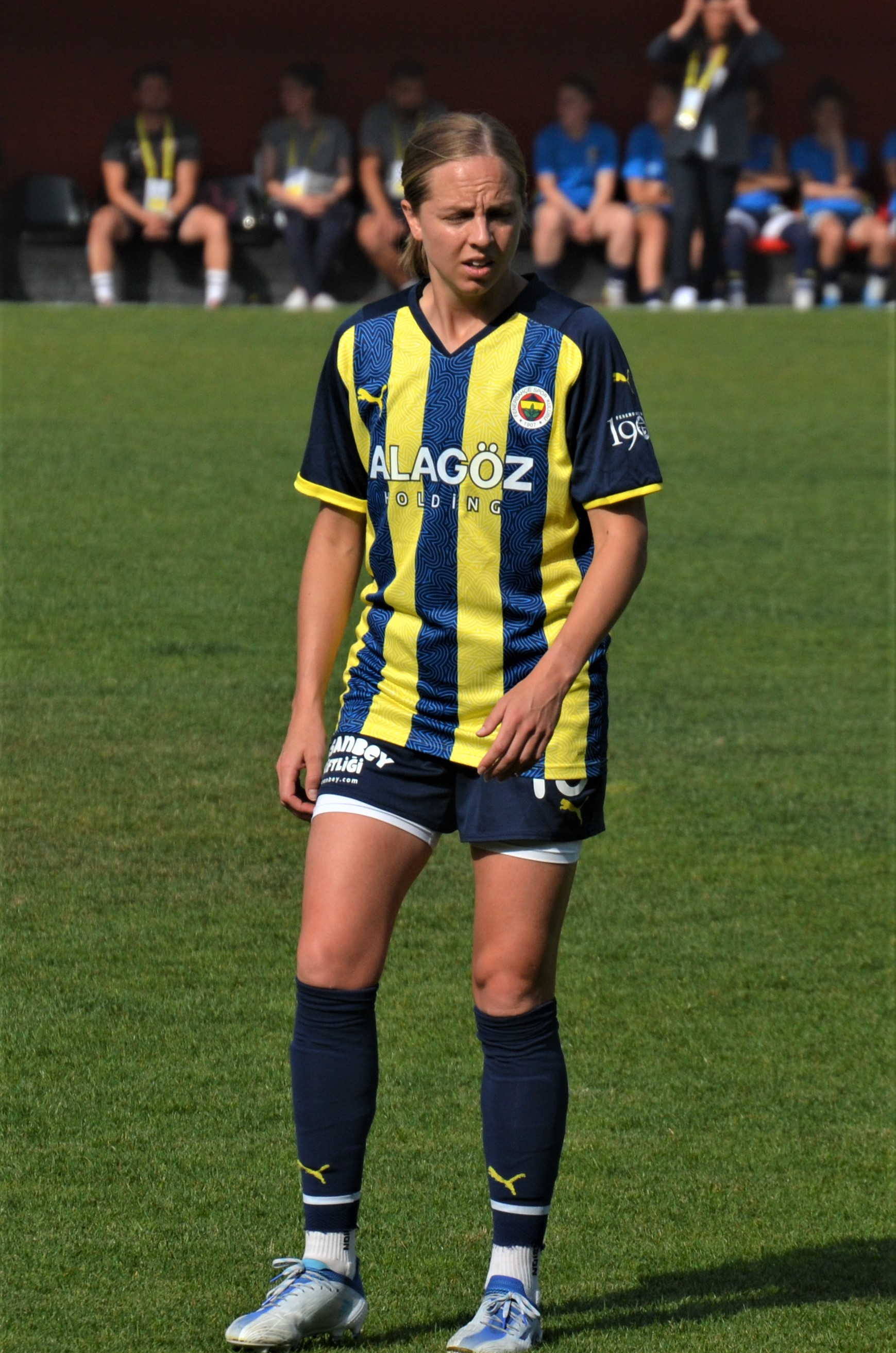
- Erin Yenney of Fenerbahçe (May 2022)

Personal information
- Full name: Erin Michelle Yenney
- Date of birth: October 20, 1992 (age 34)
- Place of birth: Troy, Ohio
- Height: 5 ft 7 in (1.70 m)
- Position: Midfielder

College career
Years	Team	Apps	(Gls)
2011–2014	Louisville Cardinals	72	(13)

Senior career*
Years	Team	Apps	(Gls)
2016	Östersunds DFF	13	(1)
2017	Santa Fe		
2018-2019	Chicago Red Stars	3	(0)
2019	Reign FC	0	(0)
2019	Åland United	8	(3)
2021–2022	Fenerbahçe	25	(6)
- * Club domestic league appearances and goals as of June 5, 2022

Erin Michelle Yenney (born October 20, 1992) is an American professional soccer player who plays as a midfielder.

== Club career ==
=== Chicago Red Stars, 2018 ===
On March 25, 2018, Erin Yenney made her debut for Chicago Red Stars in a 1–1 draw against Houston Dash.

=== Reign FC, 2019 ===
Reign FC signed Yenney as a National Team Replacement player on June 14, 2019. She was subsequently released on July 15 without making an appearance for the club.

=== Åland United, 2019– ===
Yenney signed with Finnish club Åland United in August 2019.
