= Beyzanur Aslan =

Azerbaijani footballer (born 2001)

Personal information
- Date of birth: 28 September 2001 (age 25)
- Place of birth: Antalya, Turkey
- Height: 1.63 m (5 ft 4 in)
- Position: Defender

Team information
- Current team: Fenerbahçe
- Number: 3

Senior career*
Years	Team	Apps	(Gls)
2017–2021	1207 Antalya Spor	32	(1)
2021–	Fenerbahçe	10	(0)

International career
2017-2018	Azerbaijan U17	5	(0)
2019-2020	Azerbaijan U19	6	(0)
- * Club domestic league appearances and goals as of 2 April 2022

Beyzanur Aslan (born 28 September 2001) is an Azerbaijanian professional footballer, who plays for the Istanbul-based club Fenerbahçe S.K. in the Turkish Women's Football Super League.

== Private life ==
Beyzanur Aslan was born on 28 September 2000. She grew up in Antalya, Turkey.

== Club career ==
Aslan started her career as a defender in the youth team of 1207 Antalya Spor. She played in the A-team of her hometome club in the Turkish Women's First Football League, before she transferred to the newly established Istanbul-based club Fenerbahçe.

== International career ==
In 2017, she accepted the offer of the Association of Football Federations of Azerbaijan to join the Azerbaijan women's national football team. She played for the Azerbaijan girls' U-17 and the women's U-19 national teams.

== Career statistics ==
As of 2 April 2022

Club	Season	League			Continental		National		Total	
Club	Season	Division	Apps	Goals	Apps	Goals	Apps	Goals	Apps	Goals
1207 Antalya Spor	2017–18	First League	1	0	–	–	3	0	4	0
1207 Antalya Spor	2018–19	Second League	17	0	–	–	2	0	19	0
1207 Antalya Spor	2019–20	SecondLeague	11	1	–	–	3	0	14	1
1207 Antalya Spor	2020–21	First League	3	0	–	–	3	0	6	0
1207 Antalya Spor	Total		32	1	–	–	11	0	43	1
Fenerbahçe	2021–22	Super League	10	0	–	–			10	0
Fenerbahçe	Total		10	0	–	–			10	0
Career total			42	1	–	–	11	0	53	1
