= Demet Bozkurt =

Turkish footballer (born 1996)

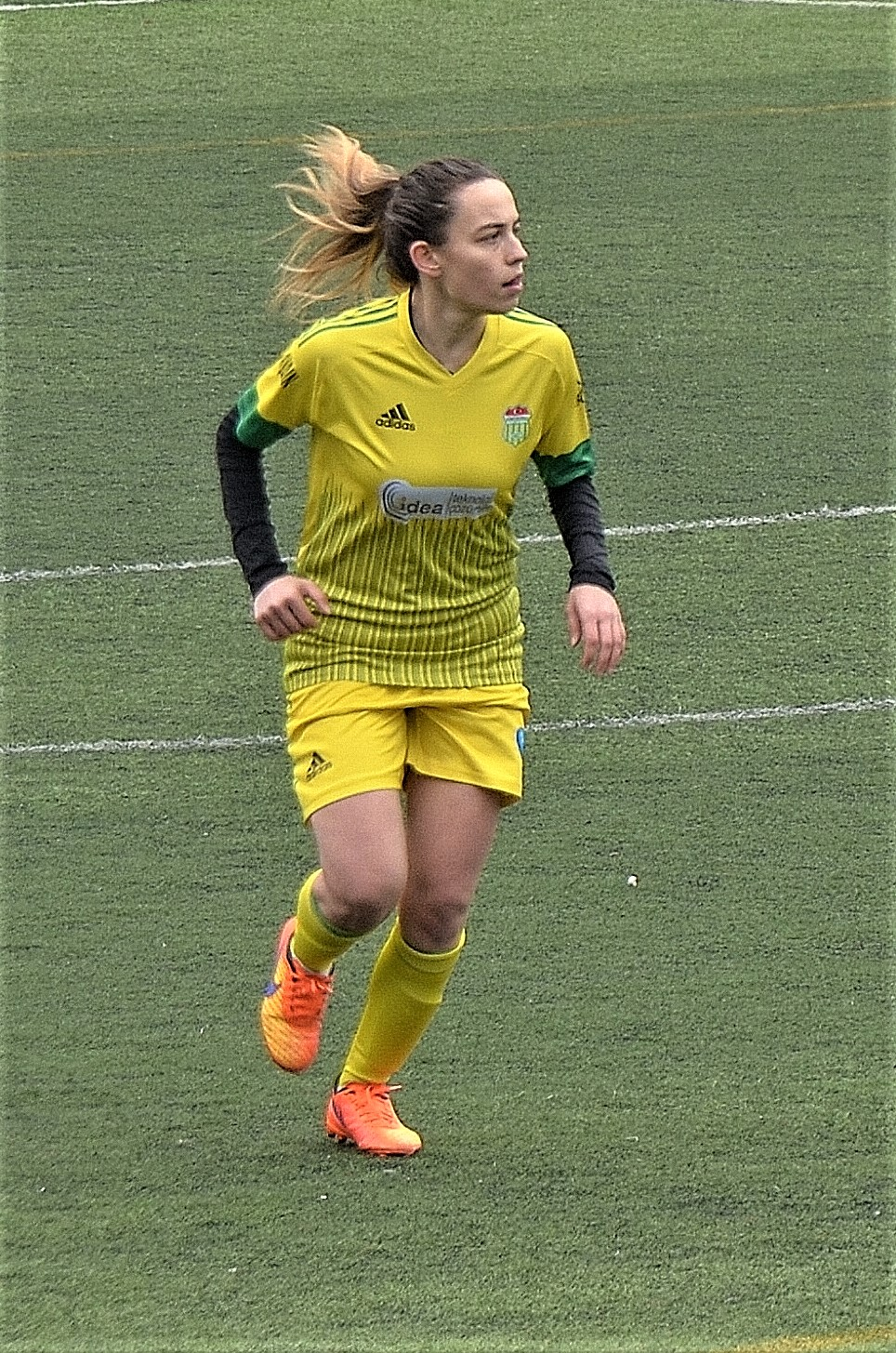
- Demet Bozkurt for Kireçburnu Spor (March 2016)

Personal information
- Date of birth: February 20, 1996 (age 30)
- Place of birth: Sarıyer, Istanbul, Turkey
- Position: Defender

Senior career*
Years	Team	Apps	(Gls)
2010–2017	Kireçburnu Spor	79	(13)
2017–2021	Beşiktaş J.K.	58	(1)
2021-2022	Fenerbahçe	16	(0)

International career^{‡}
2015	Turkey U-19	3	(0)
- * Club domestic league appearances and goals as of 5 June 2022 ‡ National team caps and goals as of 9 April 2015

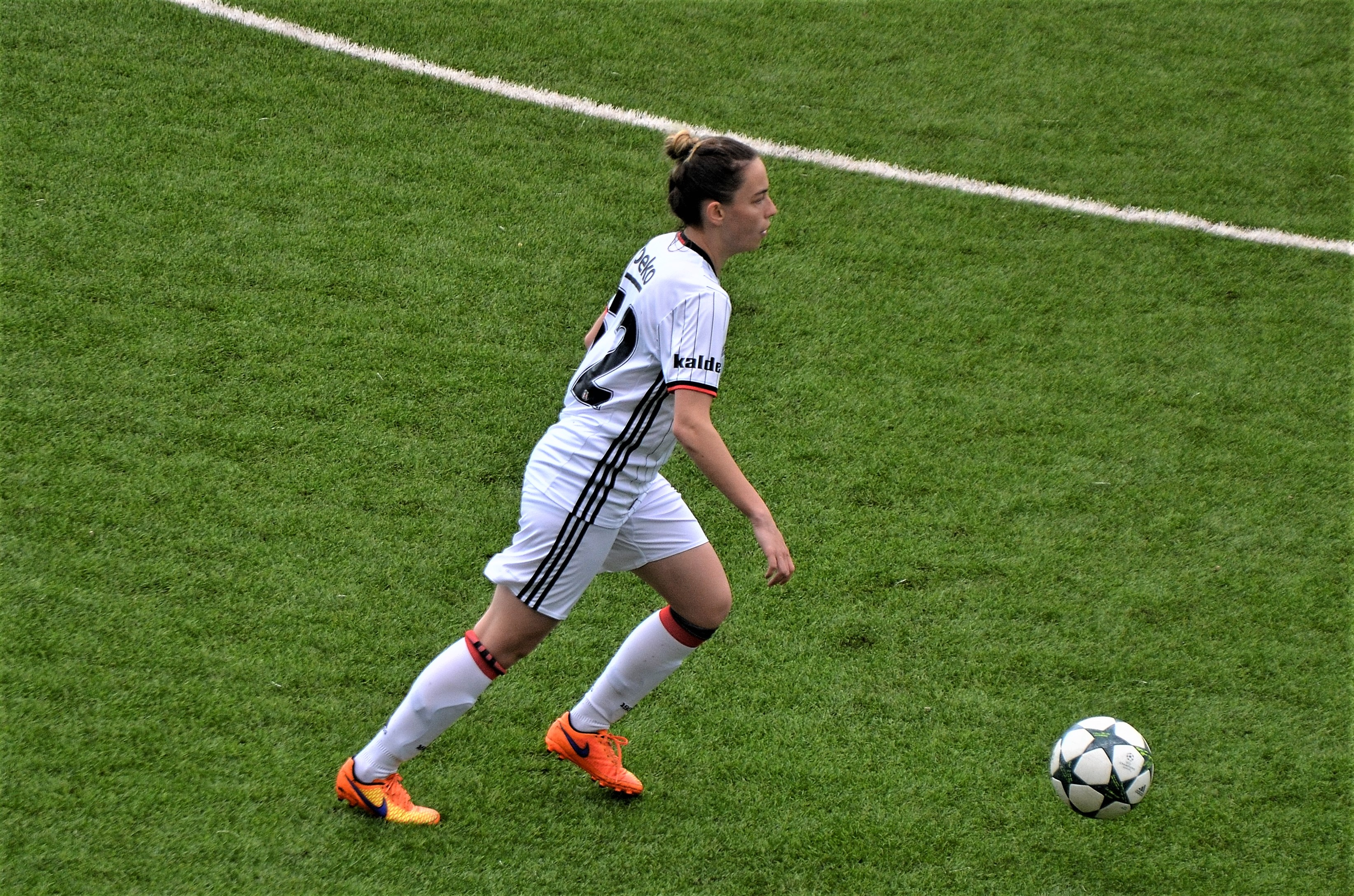
Demet Bozkurt playing for Beşiktaş J.K. in the 2016–17 First League.

Demet Bozkurt (born February 20, 1996) is a Turkish footballer. She was part of the Turkey women's national under-19 football team in 2015.

== Private life ==
Demet Bozkurt was born in Sarıyer district of Istanbul Province, Turkey on February 20, 1996.

Through her footballer career, she was able to enter the Marmara University to study physical education.

== Playing career ==
=== Club ===
Bozkurt's curiosity for playing football started at a young age. Her mother told her that she might not continue to play football unless she received her school' good marks. She worked hard, and received good marks. Her mother took her then for registration at the local sports club. Bozkurt obtained her license from Kireçburnu Spor in her hometown on October 1, 2010. She became a defender, where she played all season. At the end of the 2014–15 season, she enjoyed her team's promotion from the Women's Second League to the First League.

In the second half of the 2016–17 season, she was transferred by Beşiktaş J.K., which was newly promoted to the First league. She enjoyed the champion title of her team in the 2018-19 First League season. She took part at the 2019–20 UEFA Women's Champions League - Group 9 matches.

== International ==
Bozkurt was admitted to the Turkey women's national U-19 team, debuting in the friendly match against Bosnia and Herzegovina on March 19, 2015. She took part in two matches of the 2015 UEFA Women's Under-19 Championship qualification – Elite round Group 3. She capped three time in total for Turkey women's U-19.

== Career statistics ==
As of match played 5 June 2022.

Club	Season	League			Continental		National		Total	
Club	Season	Division	Apps	Goals	Apps	Goals	Apps	Goals	Apps	Goals
Kireçburnu Spor	2010–11	Regional League	9	9	–	–	0	0	9	9
Kireçburnu Spor	2011–12	Second League	8	4	–	–	0	0	8	4
Kireçburnu Spor	2012–13	Second League	10	0	–	–	0	0	10	0
Kireçburnu Spor	2013–14	Second League	15	0	–	–	0	0	15	0
Kireçburnu Spor	2014–15	Second League	18	0	–	–	3	0	21	0
Kireçburnu Spor	2015–16	First League	15	0	–	–	0	0	15	0
Kireçburnu Spor	2016–17	First League	4	0	–	–	0	0	4	0
Kireçburnu Spor	Total		79	13	–	–	3	0	82	13
Beşiktaş J.K.	2016–17	First League	10	0	–	–	0	0	10	0
Beşiktaş J.K.	2017–18	First League	16	0	–	–	0	0	16	0
Beşiktaş J.K.	2018–19	First League	18	1	–	–	0	0	18	1
Beşiktaş J.K.	2019–20	First League	10	0	3	0	0	0	13	0
Beşiktaş J.K.	2020–21	First League	4	0	0	0	0	0	4	0
Beşiktaş J.K.	Total		58	1	3	0	0	0	61	1
Fenerbahçe	2021–22	Super League	16	0	–	–	0	0	16	0
Fenerbahçe	Total		16	0	–	–	0	0	16	0
Career total			153	14	3	0	3	0	159	14

== Honours ==
Turkish Women's First Football League

Beşiktaş J.K.
Winners (2): 2018–19, 2020–21,
Runners-up (2): 2016–17, 2017–18

Turkish Women's Second Football League

Kireçburnu Spor
Runners-up (2): 2013-14, 2014-15
