= Mariana Jaleca =

Portuguese footballer

Personal information
- Full name: Mariana Pereira Jaleca
- Date of birth: 8 October 1997 (age 29)
- Place of birth: Portugal
- Height: 1.63 m (5 ft 4 in)
- Position: Midfielder

Team information
- Current team: Marítimo

Youth career
- 2011–2012: Palmelense FC
- 2012–2014: Quintajense FC
- 2014–2015: CAC
- 2015–2016: Estoril Praia

College career
Years	Team	Apps	(Gls)
2017–2019	Saint Francis Red Flash	46	(9)

Senior career*
Years	Team	Apps	(Gls)
	SF Damaiense	6	(1)
2020–2021	Orobica Calcio Bergamo		
2021	Åland United	20	(3)
2021–2022	Fenerbahçe	20	(5)
2022–2023	Sparta Prague	1	(2)
2023–	Marítimo	0	(0)

International career
2013	Portugal U16	2	(0)
- * Club domestic league appearances and goals as of June 5, 2022

Mariana Pereira Jaleca (born 8 October 1997) is a Portuguese professional footballer, who plays for Marítimo in the Campeonato Nacional Feminino. Previously she played for Fenerbahçe and Sparta Prague.
