= Hatayspor (women's football) =

Football club in Antakya, Turkey

- Full name: Hatayspor Kadın Futbol Takımı
- Founded: 2021; 5 years ago
- Ground: Divers
- Coordinates: 36.21177°N 36.15825°E
- Manager: (Turkey) Hilmi Bugüner
- League: Turkish Women's Super League

Hatayspor women's football (Turkish: Hatayspor Kadın Futbol Takımı) is a Turkish women's football team as part of Hatayspor based in Antakya of Hatay. They were founded in 2021. Called also as Atakaş Hatayspor, the club is sponsored by the local steel production and port management corporate group Atakaş.

== History ==
The Turkish Football Federation appealed to the major clubs of the men's top-level league of Süper Lig clubs to form their women's football sides in order to help improve the women's football in Turkey. Hatayspor women's football were established as part of the 1967-founded club in 2021. They were approved as one of the eight newly established teams to play in the restructured league of Turkish Women's Super League.

Club footballer Verda Demetgül (born 2008), died under the rubble of her apartment devastated by the earthquake in Turkey that occurred on 6 February 2023.

== Stadium ==
The team play their home matches at Defne Atatürk Stadium located in Defne district of Hatay Province.

In the 2022–23 Super League season, the team played their home matches at stadiums in different districts of Hatay Province such as Hassa Stadium in Hassa, Karaağaç Sports Complex in Arsuz, Kırıkhan City Stadium in Kırıkhan, Reyhanlı Tayfur Sökmen Stadium in Reyhanlı, and New Hatay Stadium in Antakya.

== Statistics ==
As of 5 February 2023

Season	League	Rank	Pld	W	D	L	GF	GA	GD	Pts
2021–22	Super League Gr. A	10 (^{1})	22	3	3	16	20	62	−42	12
2022–23	Super League Gr. A	3 (^{2})	16	8	3	5	30	23	+7	27
Green marks a season followed by promotion, red a season followed by relegation.

- (^{1}) : Finished Group A as 10th, remained in the league after playouts
- (^{2}) : Season in progress

== Current squad ==
As of 5 February 2023

- Head coach: (Turkey) Hilmi Bugüner

Note: Flags indicate national team as defined under FIFA eligibility rules; some limited exceptions apply. Players may hold more than one non-FIFA nationality.

No.	Pos.	Nation	Player
23	GK	TUR	Senem Pınar Özer
60	GK	TUR	Şetmanur Hapaç
4	DF	TUR	Merve Odabaşoğlu
11	DF	TUR	Nazmiye Aytop
21	DF	TUR	Emine Demir
25	DF	TUR	Aleyna Gültekin
78	DF	TUR	Aybüke Aykul
8	MF	TUR	Elvin Kılınç
9	MF	GEO	Khatia Tchkonia

No.	Pos.	Nation	Player
13	MF	AZE	Vusala Hajiyeva
14	MF	GHA	Priscilla Okyere
18	MF	BFA	Juliette Nana
70	MF	GHA	Suzzy Teye
80	MF	CIV	Aminata Haidara
16		TUR	Damla Kılınç
17		TUR	Neslihan Demirdögen
77		TUR	Seval Akbulut
99		TUR	Zeynep Cesur

== Kit history ==
2021–22 hpme
