= Kocaeli Bayan FK =

Kocaeli Bayan Futbol Kulübü
- Founded: 2016; 9 years ago
- Ground: Mehmet Ali Kağıtçı Stadium, İzmit, Kocaeli
- Coordinates: 40°45′52″N 29°54′38″E
- Chairman: Hasan Alemdaroğlu
- Manager: (Turkey) Hasan Alemdaroğlu
- League: Turkish Women's Super League
- 2020-21: 15th
Away colours

Kocaeli Bayan Futbol Kulübü, shortly Kocaeli Bayan FK, is a Turkish sole women's football sports club, based in İzmit city of Kocaeli. It was founded by Hasan Alemdaroğlu in 2016. Currently, they play in the Turkish Women's Second Football League. The club colors are green and black.

The team finished the 2018–19 Women's Second League as runners-up, and was promoted to the Turkish Women's First Football League.

== Stadium ==
Kocaeli Bayan FK play their home matches at Mehmet Ali Kağıtçı Stadium in İzmit, Kocaeli.

== History ==
After their formation, Kocaeli Bayan FK started to play in the 2017–18 season of the Turkish Women's Third Football League. They finished the league as champion after play-off matches, and were promoted to the Turkish Women's Second Football League. The team became runners-up in the 2018-19 season, and were so promoted to the Turkish Women's First Football League.

== Statistics ==
As of 16 January 2022

Season	League	Rank	Pld	W	D	L	GF	GA	GD	Pts
2017–18	Third League-Div. 3	1	15	13	2	0	100	11	+89	41
2018–19	Second League	2	29	23	4	2	112	18	+94	73
2019-20	First League	9 (^{1})	15	3	1	11	18	39	-21	10
2020-21	First League Gr. D	15	3	0	1	2	3	6	-3	1
2021-22	Super League Gr. A	10 (^{2})	13	3	0	10	20	47	-27	9
Green marks a season followed by promotion, red a season followed by relegation.

- (^{1}) Season discontinued due to COVID-19 pandemic in Turkey
- (^{2}) Season in progress

== Current squad ==
As of 9 March 2022

- Head coach: (Turkey) Hasan Alemdaroğlu

Note: Flags indicate national team as defined under FIFA eligibility rules; some limited exceptions apply. Players may hold more than one non-FIFA nationality.

No.	Pos.	Nation	Player
1	GK	(Turkey) TUR	Sudenur Yolcu
3		(Turkey) TUR	Sıla Fidan
4		(Turkey) TUR	Sedanur İnce
6		(Turkey) TUR	Almila Dilek Eroktay
7	MF	(Turkey) TUR	Merve Şıkkibar (C)
8	DF	(Uzbekistan) UZB	Solikha Khusniddinova
9	FW	(Turkey) TUR	Erva Karaovalı
10		(Turkey) TUR	Şeyda Peçe
12	GK	(Turkey) TUR	Kübra Cemre Ustaoğlu
15		(Turkey) TUR	Havva Aykut

No.	Pos.	Nation	Player
16		(Turkey) TUR	Rabia Balaban
17		(Turkey) TUR	Kübra Deniz
18		(Turkey) TUR	Sude Yavuz
23		(Turkey) TUR	Merve Ahmetoğlu
24		(Turkey) TUR	Sıla Yıldızhan
25		(Turkey) TUR	Buse Dağdelen
26		(Turkey) TUR	Sude Dağdelen
28		(Turkey) TUR	Nilsu Gül
41		(Turkey) TUR	Feyza Ece Uslu
61	MF	(Turkey) TUR	Pelin Nur Çelebi

== Honours ==
Turkish Women's Second Football League

- Runners-up (1): 2018–19

Turkish Women's Third Football League

- Winners (1): 2016–17

== Kit history ==
2019–20 home	2019–20 away	2020–21 away

== Squads ==
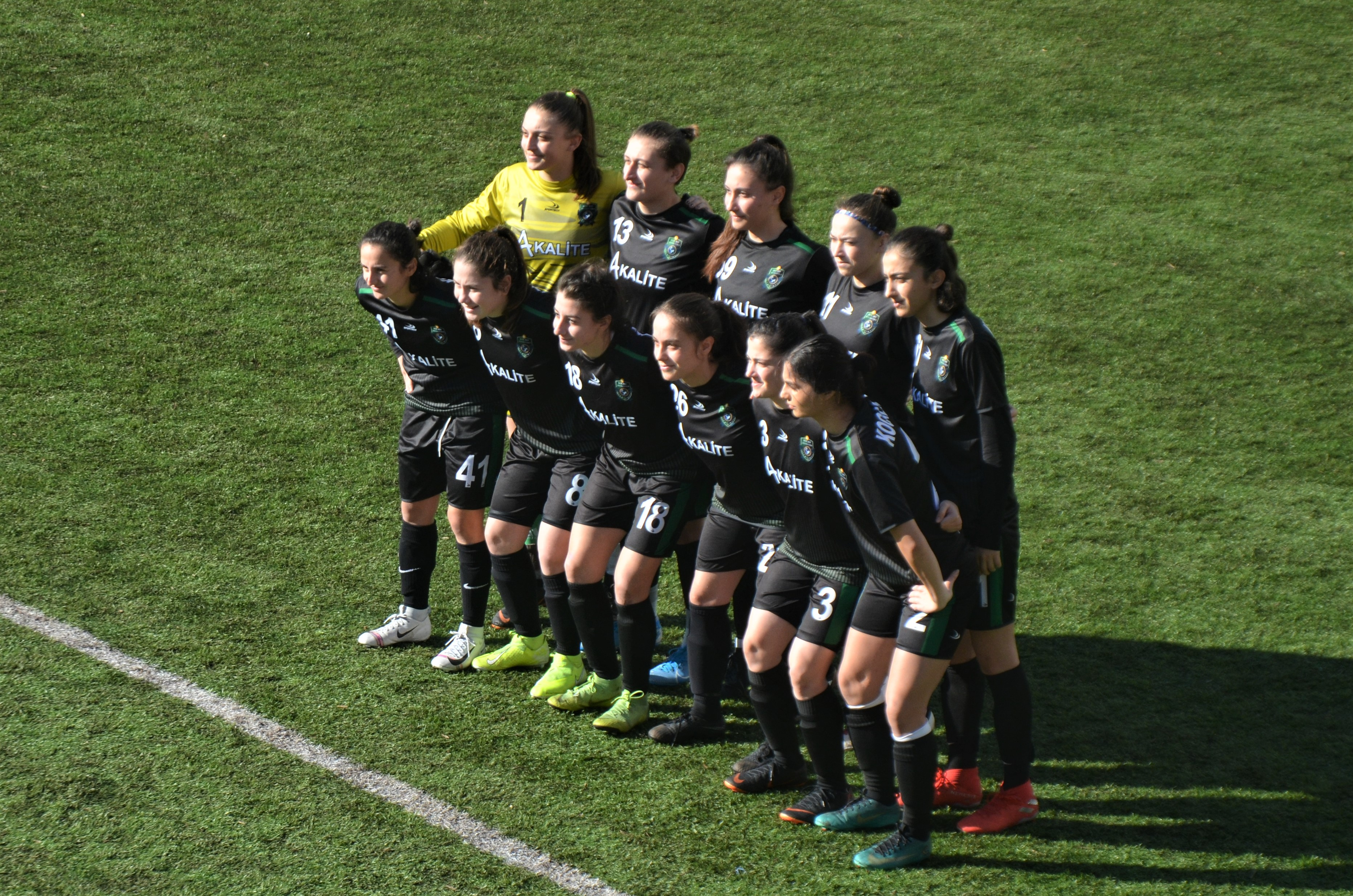
Kocaeli Bayan F.K. squad in the 2019-20 Women's First league.
