= Sevgi Salmanlı =

Turkish footballer (born 1993)

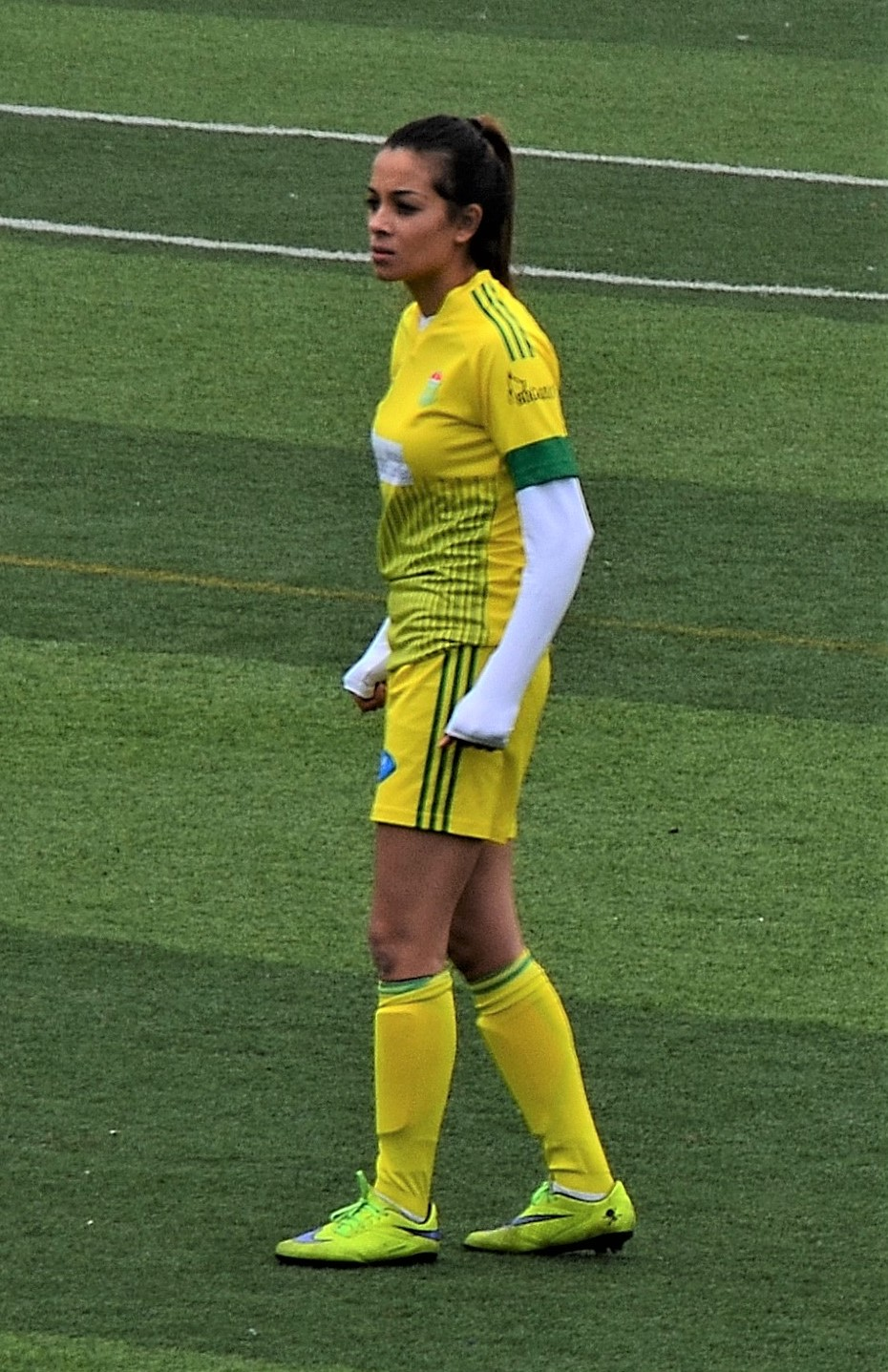
- Sevgi Salmanlı of Kireçburnu Spor (March 2016)

Personal information
- Date of birth: November 21, 1993 (age 32)
- Place of birth: Küçükçekmece, Istanbul, Turkey
- Position: Forward

Team information
- Current team: Beşiktaş J.K.
- Number: 99

Senior career*
| Years | Team | Apps | (Gls) |
| 2010 | Zeytinburnuspor | 1 | (0) |
| 2010–2011 | Altınşehir Lisesi Spor | 1 | (0) |
| 2011–2014 | Bakırköy Zara | 28 | (5) |
| 2014–2019 | Kireçburnu Spor | 94 | (11) |
| 2019– | Beşiktaş J.K. | 8 | (0) |

International career^{‡}
| 2017 | Turkey | 2 | (0) |
- * Club domestic league appearances and goals as of 1 March 2020 ‡ National team caps and goals as of March 7, 2017

Sevgi Salmanlı (born November 21, 1993) is a Turkish women's football forward currently playing in the Turkish Women's First Football League for Beşiktaş J.K. in Istanbul with jersey number 99. She was a member of the Turkey women's national team.

== Personal life ==
Sevi Salmanlı was born in Küçükçekmece, Istanbul Province, Turkey on November 21, 1993.

She studies in Edirne.

== Sports career ==
Salmanlı began football playing with boys on the street at a very young age, and enjoyed striking a goal by dribbling fast. She liked to continue as a footballer. She was supported in her interest for football playing by her mother, who took her for registration in a club.

=== Club ===
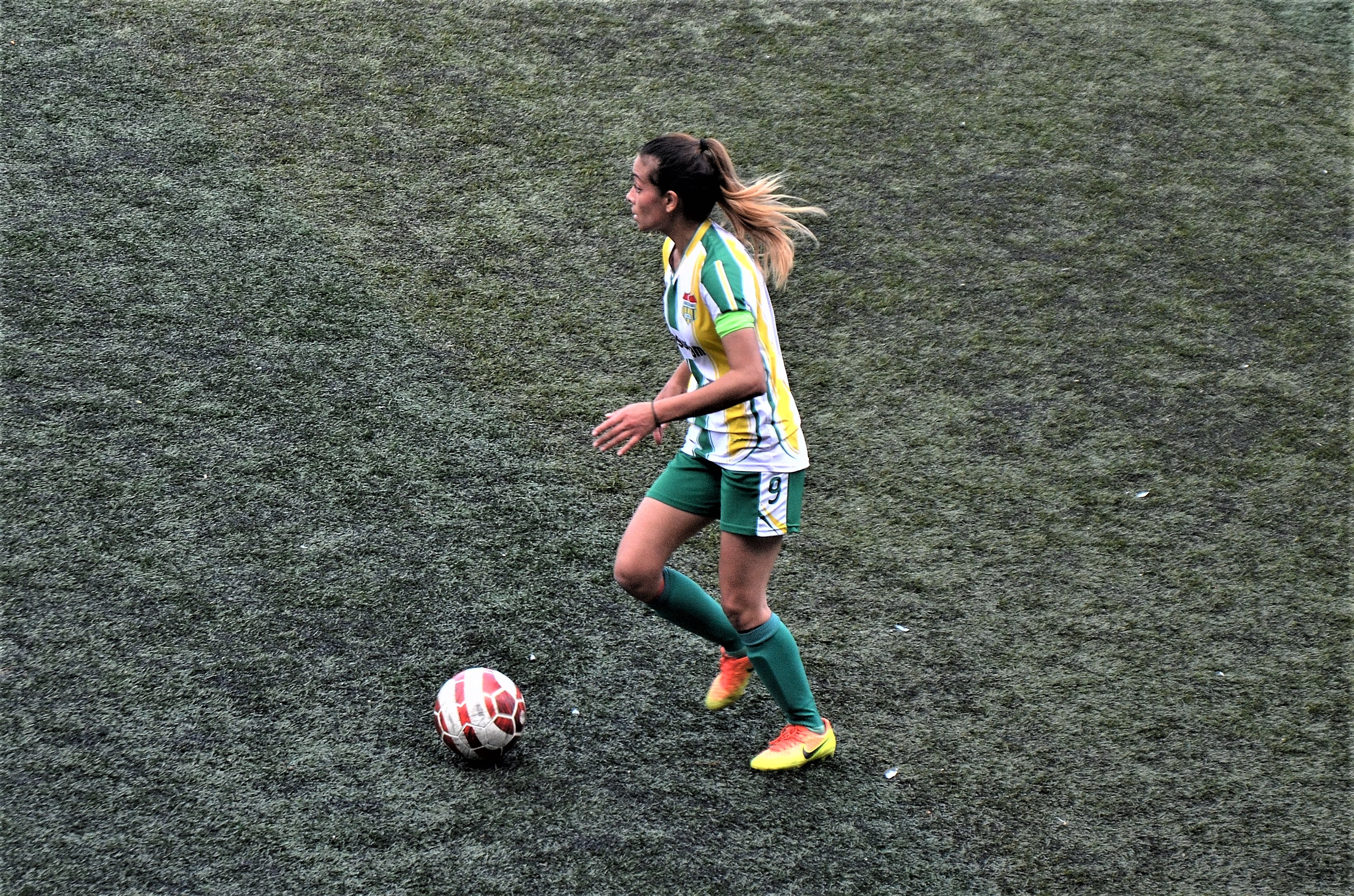
Sevgi Salmanlı playing for Kireçburnu Spor in the 2016-17 First League.

Salmanlı obtained her license from Zeytinburnuspor on April 27, 2010. She played one game each for Zeytinburnuspor in the 2009–10 and then for her high school team altınşehir Lisesi Spor in the 2010–11 Second League. In the 2011–12 season, she transferred to Bakırköy Zara, which also played in the Second League. After 2 1/2 seasons, Salmanlı joined Kireçburnu Spor in the second half of the 2013–14 Second League season. Her team finished the 2014–15 season as winner, and was promoted to the First League.

She plays in the left wing position.

Salmanlı was transferred by the 2018–19 Women's First League champion Beşiktaş J.K. to play in the 2019–20 UEFA Women's Champions League - Group 9 matches.

=== International ===
Salmanlı was admitted to the Turkey national team, and debuted internationally in the match against Romania at the 2017 Goldencity Women's Cup held in Antalya, Turkey on March 1. She capped twice for the nationals.

== Career statistics ==
As of match played 1 March 2020.

| Club | Season | League | | | Continental | | National | | Total | |
| Club | Season | Division | Apps | Goals | Apps | Goals | Apps | Goals | Apps | Goals |
|---|---|---|---|---|---|---|---|---|---|---|
| Zeytinburnuspor | 2009–10 | Second League | 1 | 0 | – | – | 0 | 0 | 1 | 0 |
| Zeytinburnuspor | Total | | 1 | 0 | – | – | 0 | 0 | 1 | 0 |
| Altınşehir Lisesi Spor | 2010–11 | Second League | 1 | 0 | – | – | 0 | 0 | 1 | 0 |
| Altınşehir Lisesi Spor | Total | | 1 | 0 | – | – | 0 | 0 | 1 | 0 |
| Bakırköy Zara | 2011–12 | Second League | 8 | 0 | – | – | 0 | 0 | 8 | 0 |
| Bakırköy Zara | 2012–13 | Second League | 10 | 3 | – | – | 0 | 0 | 10 | 3 |
| Bakırköy Zara | 2013–14 | Second League | 10 | 2 | – | – | 0 | 0 | 10 | 2 |
| Bakırköy Zara | Total | | 28 | 5 | – | – | 1 | 0 | 28 | 5 |
| Kireçburnu Spor | 2013–14 | Second League | 6 | 0 | – | – | 0 | 0 | 6 | 0 |
| Kireçburnu Spor | 2014–15 | Second League | 22 | 5 | – | – | 0 | 0 | 22 | 5 |
| Kireçburnu Spor | 2015–16 | First League | 18 | 2 | – | – | 0 | 0 | 18 | 2 |
| Kireçburnu Spor | 2016–17 | First League | 22 | 0 | – | – | 2 | 0 | 24 | 0 |
| Kireçburnu Spor | 2017–18 | First League | 10 | 2 | – | – | 0 | 0 | 10 | 2 |
| Kireçburnu Spor | 2018–19 | First League | 16 | 2 | – | – | 0 | 0 | 16 | 2 |
| Kireçburnu Spor | Total | | 94 | 11 | – | – | 2 | 0 | 96 | 16 |
| Beşiktaş J.K. | 2019–20 | First League | 8 | 0 | 1 | 0 | 0 | 0 | 9 | 0 |
| Beşiktaş J.K. | Total | | 8 | 0 | 1 | 0 | 0 | 0 | 9 | 0 |
| Career total | | | 132 | 16 | 1 | 0 | 2 | 0 | 135 | 16 |

== Honours ==
Turkish Women's Second League

Kireçburnu Spor
Winners (1): 2014–15
