= Berivan İçen =

Turkish association footballer

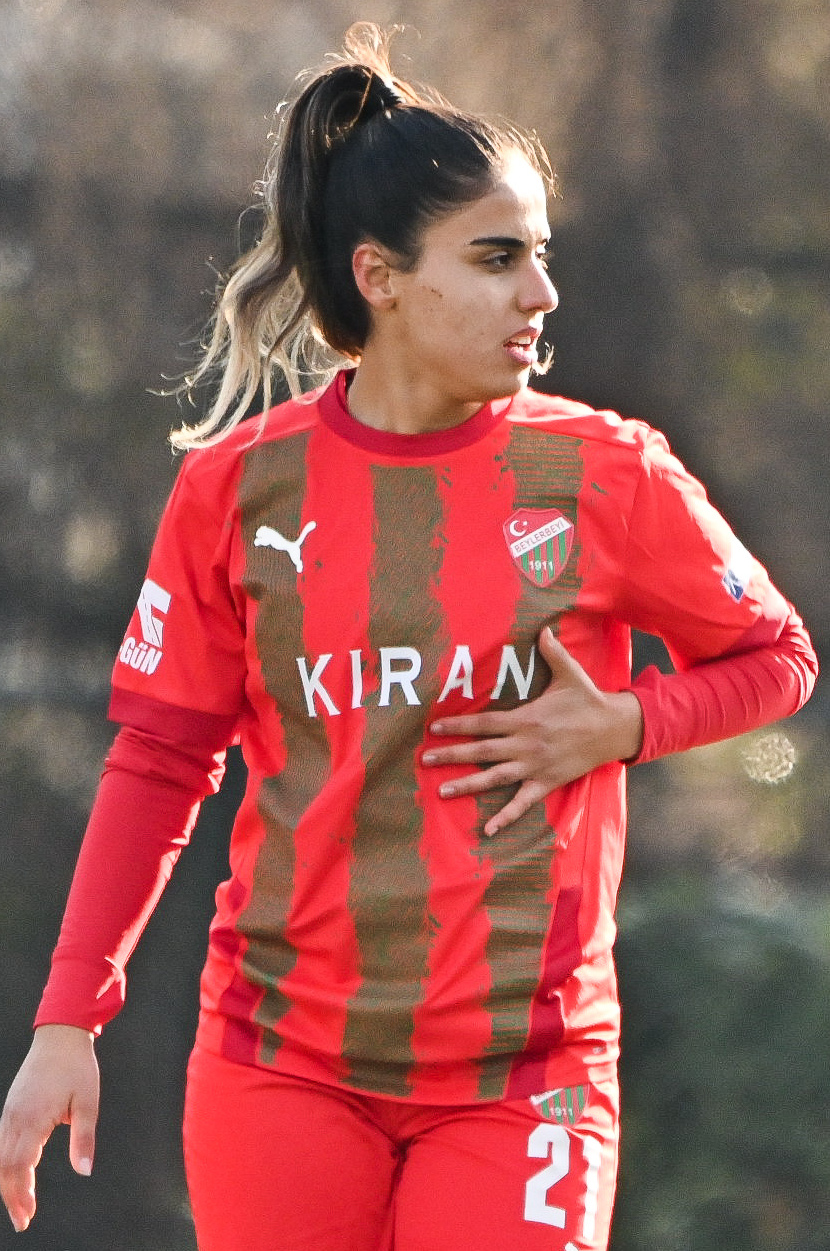
- Berivan İçen of Beylerbeyi (January 2024)

Personal information
- Date of birth: 15 July 2003 (age 23)
- Place of birth: Mazıdağı, Mardin Province, Turkey
- Height: 1.69 m (5 ft 7 in)
- Position: Midfielder

Team information
- Current team: Dynamo Moscow
- Number: 21

Youth career
- 2015–2016: Galatasaray

Senior career*
Years	Team	Apps	(Gls)
2016–2018	Beşiktaş	0	(0)
2018–2019	Akdeniz Nurçelik	14	(15)
2019–2023	Beşiktaş	47	(4)
2023–2025	Beylerbeyi	27	(2)
2025–	Dynamo Moscow	5	(2)

International career^{‡}
2017–2019	Turkey U17	24	(12)
2017–2022	Turkey U19	8	(6)
2020–	Turkey	2	(0)
- * Club domestic league appearances and goals as of 19 May 2025 ‡ National team caps and goals as of 11 April 2022

Berivan İçen (born 15 July 2003) is a Turkish footballer, who plays for the Russian Women's Football Championship club Dynamo Moscow as a midfielder. She was a member of the Turkey women's national under-17 football team and now represents the Turkish women's national team.

== Early life ==
Berivan İçen was born to a Kurdish family in Mazıdağı district of Mardin Province, southeastern Turkey, on 15 July 2003. She has nine siblings.

== Club career ==
İçen began playing football at age six in 2010. She was discovered as she drew the attention of the chairman of amateur club Cennet Barbarosspor's in Küçükçekmece, district of Istanbul Province. She was playing with the football on the touchline. The club chairman convinced her father to let her join by promising to finance the girl's education expenses. In 2012, she entered the team of her age group, which consisted of boys only. That year, the left-footed girl was instrumental for her team's advance to the quarter-finals at a tournament organized by the Municipality of Küçükçekmece in the National Sovereignty and Children's Day.

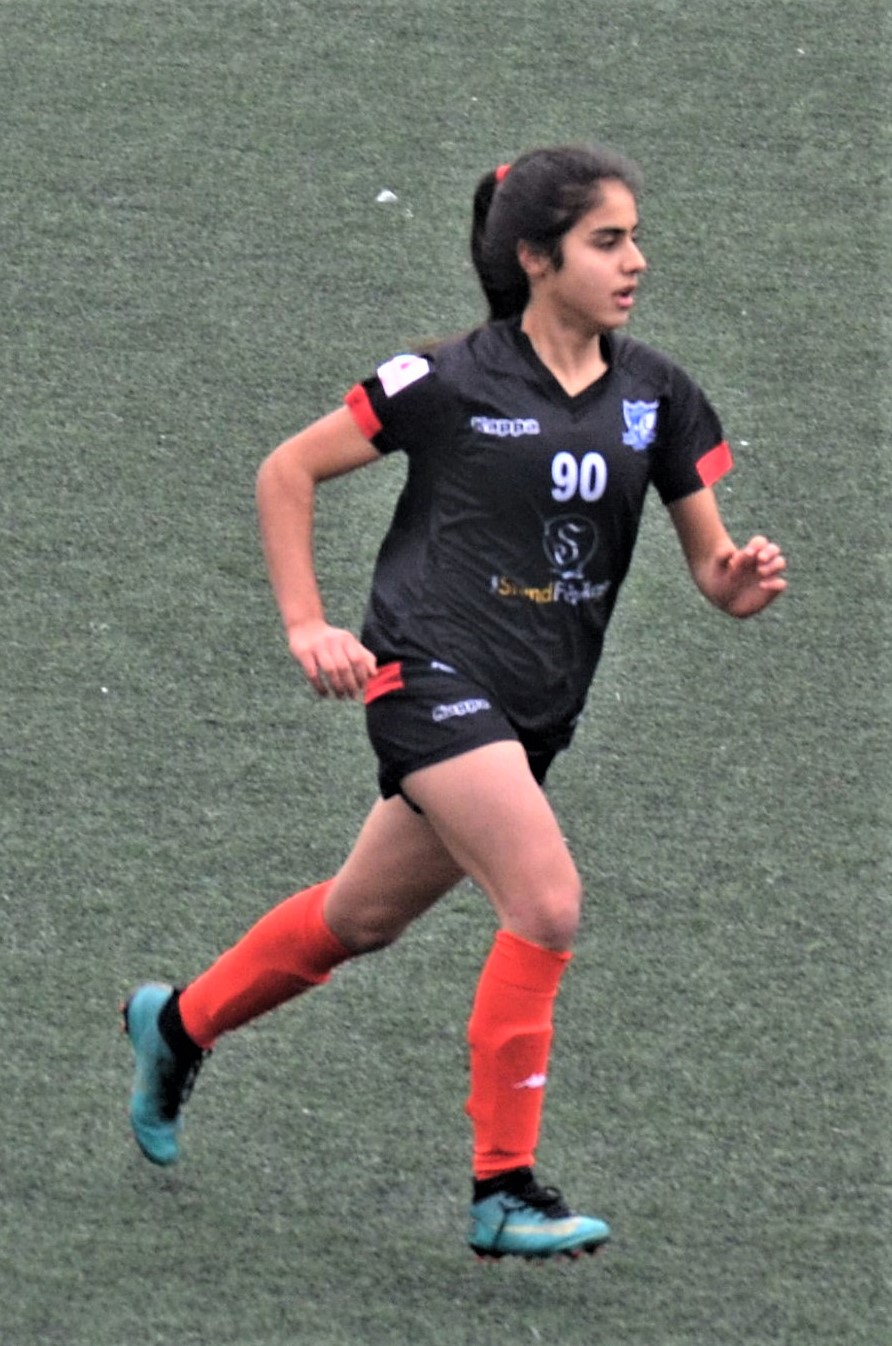
Berivan İçen (#90) with Akdeniz Nurçelik Spor in the 2018–19 Second League match

İçen obtained her license to play for Galatasaray on 17 April 2015. She scored eleven goals in a match of the 7th round in the 2016 Girls' under-13 League (Minik Kızlar Ligi) that ended 15–0 for her team Galatasaray. In October 2016, after Galatasaray closed the women's football department, she transferred to Beşiktaş In the 2018–19 season, she joined Akdeniz Nurçelik Spor in Küçükçekmece to play in the Women's Second League. She scored 15 goals in 14 matches. In the 2020–21 season, she returned to her former club Beşiktaş, where she scored two goals in nine games. Following her team's champion title in the 2020–21 Turkcell League season, she played in two matches of the 2021–22 UEFA Women's Champions League qualifying rounds.

In August 2023, she signed with the newly to the Super League promoted club Beylerbeyi S.K. to play in the 2023–24 season.

== International career ==
İçen was called up to the Turkey women's national under-17 football team, and debuted in the friendly match against Russia on 21 December 2017. She played in two of the 2018 UEFA Women's under-17 Championship qualification matches. She took part in three 2018 UEFA Women's Under-16 Development Tournament matches. Further, she played in three 2020 UEFA Women's under-17 Championship qualification matches. She has been capped 25 times by the Turkey women's under-17 team, and scored 12 goals in total.

In September 2020, she was called up to the Turkey women's national team. She debuted at the UEFA Women's Euro 2021 qualifying match against Slovenia on 18 September 2020.

== Career statistics ==
As of match played 22 September 2024.

Club	Season	League			Continental		National		Total	
Club	Season	Division	Apps	Goals	Apps	Goals	Apps	Goals	Apps	Goals
Beşiktaş	2017–18	First League	0	0	–	–	7	1	7	1
Akdeniz Nurçelik	2018–19	Second League	14	15	–	–	10	5	24	20
Beşiktaş	2019–20	First League	9	2	–	–	8	6	17	8
Beşiktaş	2020–21	First League	5	0	–	–	1	0	6	0
Beşiktaş	2021–22	Super League	19	2	2	0	8	6	29	8
Beşiktaş	2022–23	Super League	14	0	0	0	0	0	14	0
Beşiktaş	Total		47	4	2	0	17	12	66	16
Beylerbeyi.	2023–24	Super League	26	2	0	0	0	0	26	2
Beylerbeyi.	2024–25	Super League	1	9	0	0	0	0	1	0
Beylerbeyi.	Total		27	2	2	0	0	0	27	2
Career total			88	21	2	0	34	18	124	39

== Honours ==
Turkish Women's First League

Beşiktaş J.K.
Winners (1): 2020–21
Runners-up (1): 2019–20 ^{1}
