= Elif Keskin =

Turkish footballer (born 2002)

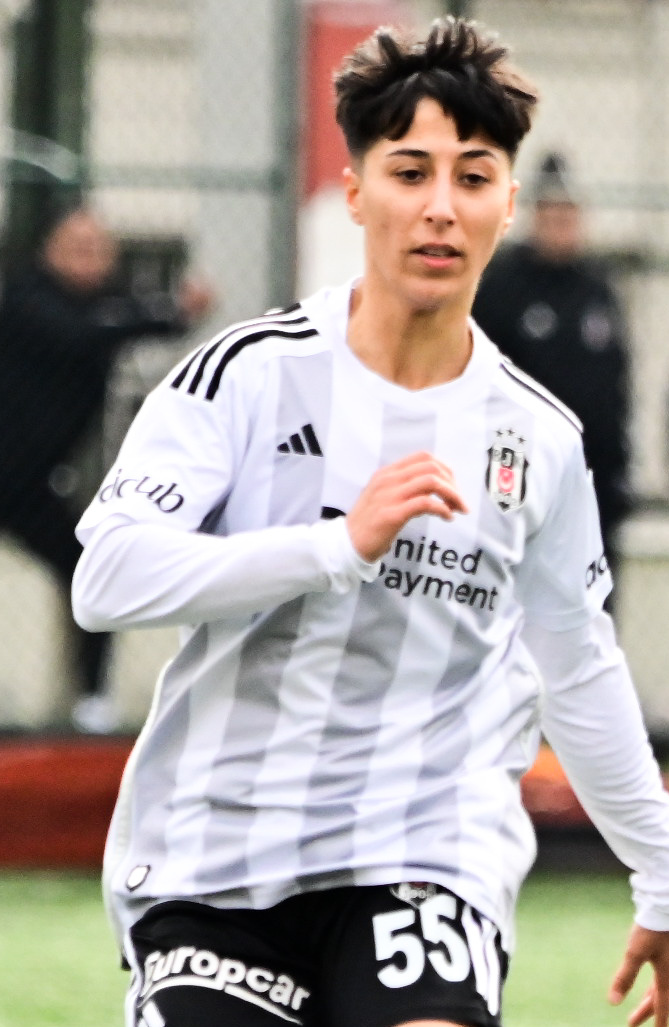
- Elif Keskin of Beşiktaş (January 2024)

Personal information
- Date of birth: 12 January 2002 (age 24)
- Place of birth: Gaziosmanpaşa, Istanbul, Turkey
- Position: Midfielder

Team information
- Current team: Galatasaray
- Number: 55

Senior career*
Years	Team	Apps	(Gls)
2017–2022	Beşiktaş	69	(16)
2022–2023	Fatih Karagümrük S.K.	17	(6)
2023–2025	Beşiktaş	49	(6)
2025–	Galatasaray	0	(0)

International career^{‡}
2016	Turkey U-15	2	(0)
2017–2018	Turkey U-17	27	(3)
2019	Turkey U-19	7	(0)
2020–	Turkey	43	(6)
- * Club domestic league appearances and goals as of 5 February 2023 ‡ National team caps and goals as of 30 May 2025

Elif Keskin (born 12 January 2002) is a Turkish women's football midfielder, who plays in the Turkish Women's Super League for Galatasaray with jersey number 55. She played for the Turkey national U-17 and Turkey U-19 teams before she became a member of the Turkey team.

== Club career ==
=== Beşiktaş ===
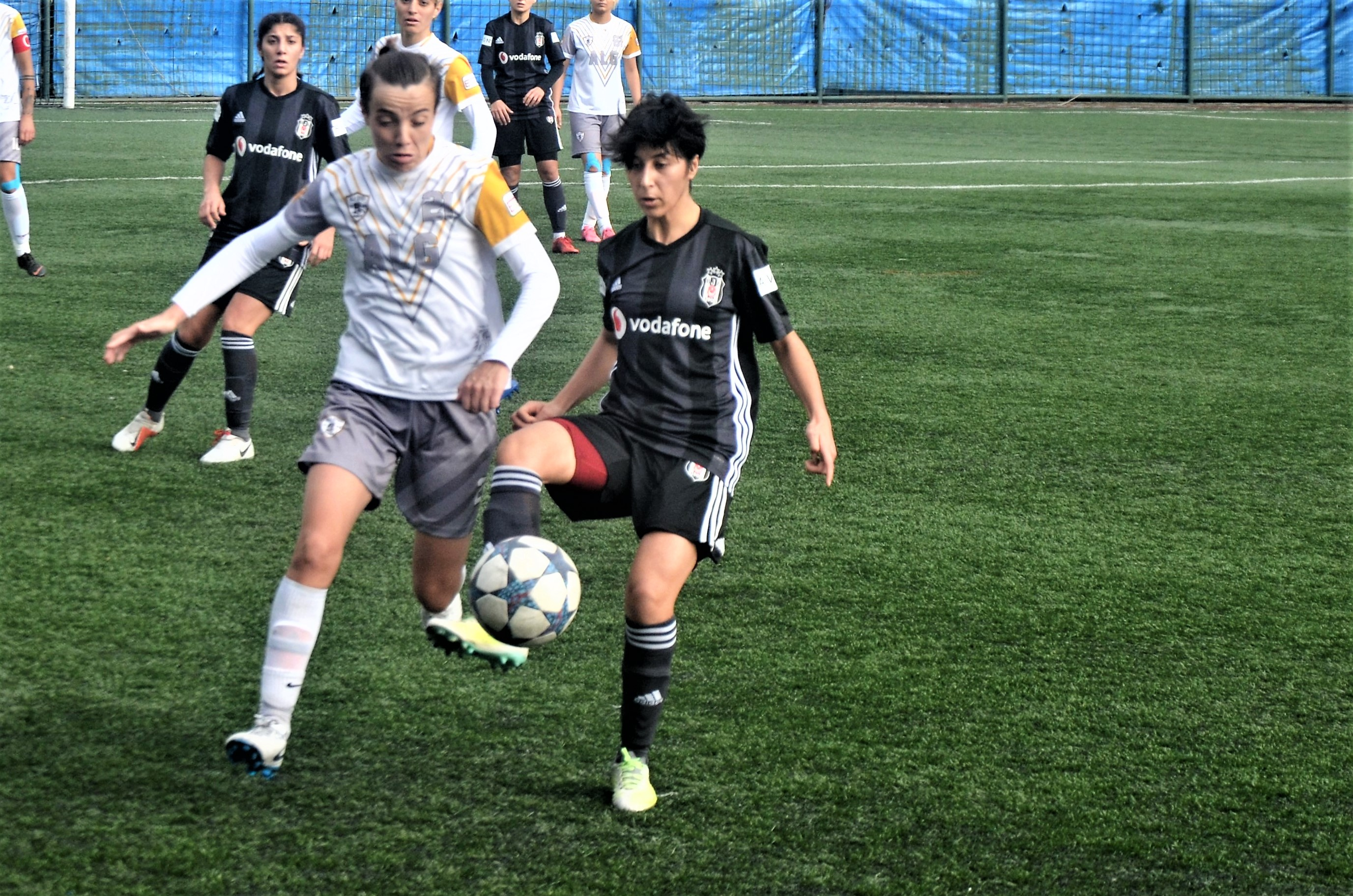
Elif Keskin (black) of Beşiktaş playing in the 2018–19 Women's First League against ALG Spor.

Elif Keskinobtained her license from Beşiktaş J.K. on 30 May 2014. She debuted for her team in the Turkish Women's First League match on 5 February 2017. In the 2018–19 Women's First League season, she enjoyed her team'league champion title.

She was part of the 2018–19 Women's First League champion team Beşiktaş J.K. at the |2019–20 UEFA Women's Champions League – Group 9 matches. She scored one goal against the Dutch FC Twente Vrouwen. Following her team's champion title in the 2020–21 Turkcell League season, she played in two matches of the 2021–22 UEFA Women's Champions League qualifying rounds.

International goals
Date	Venue	Opponent	Competition	Result	Scored
Beşiktaş
August 10, 2019	Sportpark Scheurserve, Enschede, Netherlands	(Netherlands) FC Twente Vrouwen	2019–20 UEFA Women's Champions League – Group 9	D 2–2	1

=== Fatih Karagümrük ===
In the 2022–23 Super League, she transferred to Fatih Karagümrük S.K.

=== Galatasaray ===
On August 1, 2025, she signed a contract with the Turkish giant Galatasaray.

== International career ==
Keskin was admitted to the Turkey women's national under-15 team, and debuted in the friendly match against Moldova on 7 April 2016. She capped in two matches for the Turkey U-15 team.

She became then a member of the Turkey U-17 team in the friendly match against Russia on 25 January 2017. She took part at the 2018 UEFA Women's Under-17 Championship qualification – Group 7 and 2018 UEFA qualification – Elite Round Group 6 matches in addition to the UEFA Development Tournaments in 2017 and 2018. She capped 27 times in total, and scored three goals.

On 27 February 2019, she debuted for the Turkey U-19 team in the friendly match against Belgium U*19 team. She took part at the 2019 UEFA Women's Under-19 Championship qualification – Elite round Group 6 and matches.

== Career statistics ==
As of match played 5 February 2023.

Club	Season	League			Continental		National		Total	
Club	Season	Division	Apps	Goals	Apps	Goals	Apps	Goals	Apps	Goals
Beşiktaş	2015–2016	Second League	0	0	–	–	2	0	2	0
Beşiktaş	2016–17	First League	3	2	–	–	7	0	10	2
Beşiktaş	2017–18	First League	11	2	–	–	13	1	24	3
Beşiktaş	2018–19	First League	12	3	–	–	10	2	22	5
Beşiktaş	2019–20	First League	14	4	2	1	4	0	20	5
Beşiktaş	2020–21	First League	6	2	0	0	5	0	11	2
Beşiktaş	2021–22	Super League	23	3	2	0	12	1	37	4
Beşiktaş	Total		69	16	4	1	53	4	126	21
Fatih Karagümrük	2022–23	Super League	11	5	–	–	3	1	14	6
Fatih Karagümrük	Total		11	5	–	–	3	1	14	6
Career total			80	21	4	1	56	5	140	27

== International goals ==
No.	Date	Venue	Opponent	Score	Result	Competition
1.	12 November 2022	Emirhan Sport Center, Antalya, Turkey	Jordan	5–0	7–0	Friendly
2.	15 November 2022	Emirhan Sport Center, Antalya, Turkey	Jordan	5–0	5–0	Friendly
3.	16 July 2024	Ménfői úti Stadion, Győr, Hungary	Hungary	2–0	4–1	UEFA Women's Euro 2025 qualifying
4.	25 October 2024	Esenler Stadium, Istanbul, Turkey	Ukraine	1–1	1–1	UEFA Women's Euro 2025 qualifying play-offs
5.	25 February 2025	Esenler Stadium, Istanbul, Turkey	Greece	1–0	1–0	2025 UEFA Women's Nations League

== Honours ==
Turkish Women's First League

Beşiktaş J.K.
Winners (2): 2018–19, 2020–21
Runners-up (2): 2016–17, 2017–18
