= Seda Nur İncik =

Turkish footballer (born 2000)

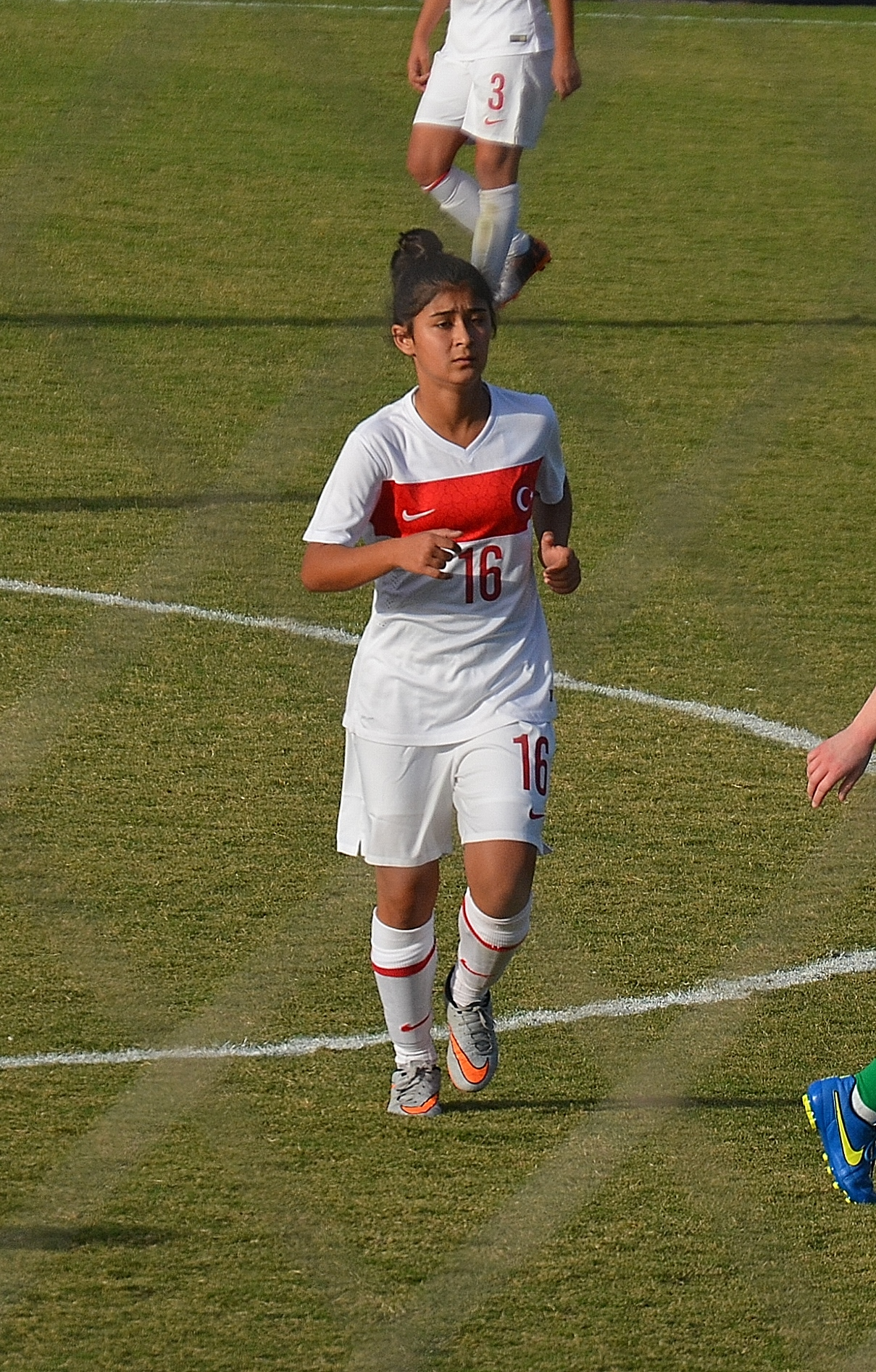
- Seda Nur İncik playing for the Turkey gitls' national U-17 team

Personal information
- Date of birth: 6 October 2000 (age 26)
- Place of birth: Kepez, Antalya, Turkey
- Position: Midfielder

Team information
- Current team: Beşiktaş J.K.
- Number: 8

Senior career*
Years	Team	Apps	(Gls)
2010–2019	1207 Antalyaspor	86	(23)
2019–2020	Konak Belediyespor	15	(7)
2019–	Beşiktaş J.K.	26	(1)

International career^{‡}
2015–2016	Turkey U-17	8	(1)
2017–2019	Turkey U-19	21	(2)
- * Club domestic league appearances and goals as of 23 October 2022 ‡ National team caps and goals as of 28 June 2022

Seda Nur İncik (born 6 October 2000) is a Turkish football midfielder playing in the Turkish Women's First League for Beşiktaş J.K. with jersey number 8. She was a member of the Turkey girl's U-17 and Turkey women's U-19 teams.

== Early years ==
İncik was born as the second child to a trader family in Kepez, Antalya on 6 October 2000.

At age eight, she began to play football with boys of her neighborhood. She continued to play in the breaktime during her primary education. She then became a member of the newly established girls' football team of her scholl.

== Club career ==
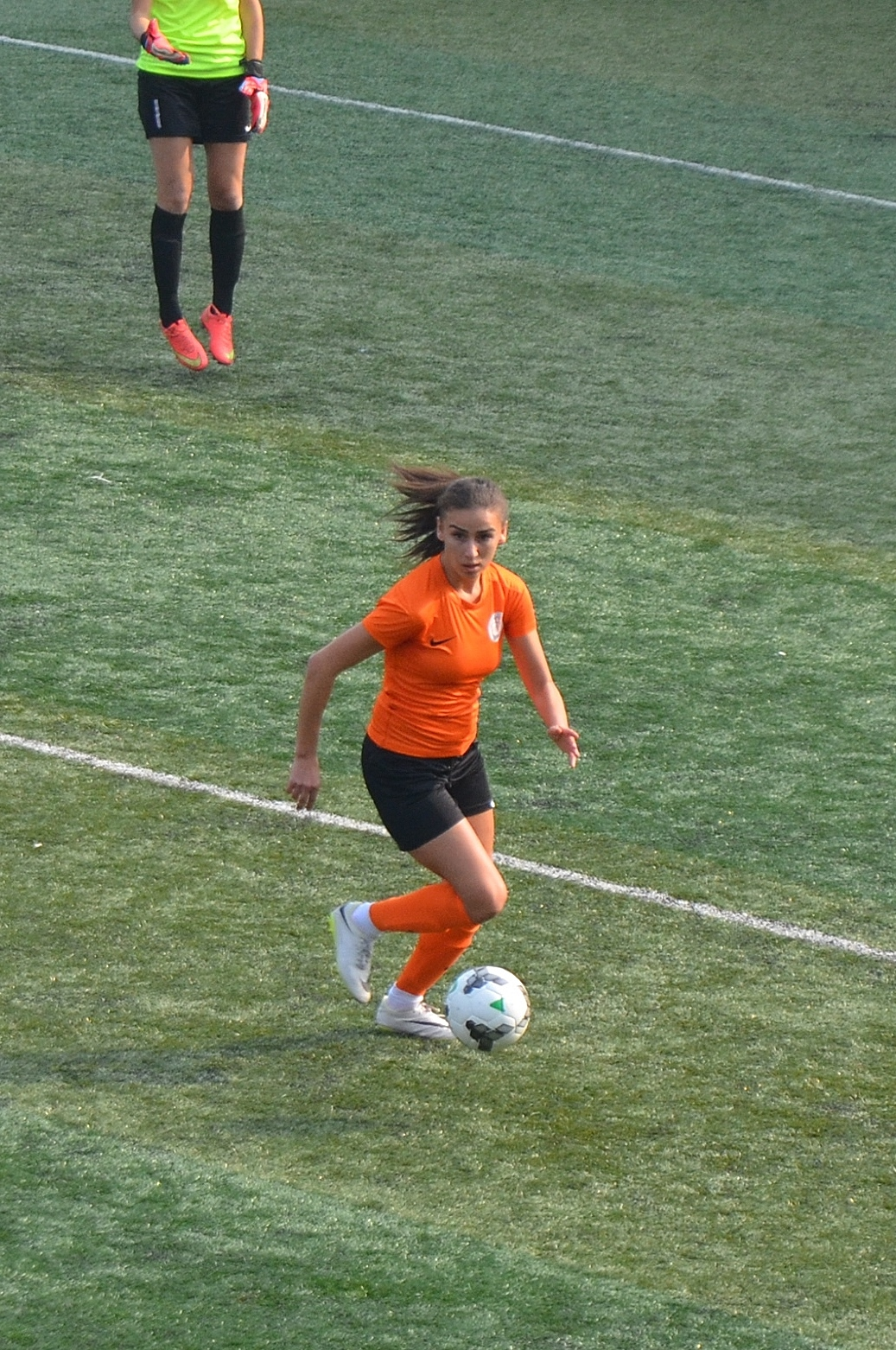
İncik driving the ball for 1207 Antalya Muratpaşa Belediyespor in the 2015–16 season's away match against Kireçburnu Spor

İncik obtained her license on January 14, 2014, and was admitted to the 1207 Antalyaspor club in her hometown. She made her first appearance in the 2014–15 season. She played five years in her hometown's club.

İncik transferred to the İzmir-based club Konak Belediyespor in the 2019-20 Turkish Women's First Football League season after playing five years for her hometown team.

She transferred to Beşiktaş J.K. in the 2020-21 Turkcell Women's Football League season. She enjoyed her team's champions title, and played in two matches of the 2021–22 UEFA Women's Champions League qualifying rounds.

== International career ==
İncik was admitted to the Turkey girls' national U-17 team and took part in one match of the 2015 UEFA Women's Under-16 Development Tournament, in one of the 2016 UEFA Women's Under-17 Championship qualification, three of the 2016 UEFA Women's Under-16 Development Tournament and three of the 2017 UEFA Women's Under-17 Championship qualification matches.

She was called up to the Turkey women's U-19 team, and debuted at the 2017 UEFA Women's Under-19 Championship qualification Elite round Gr. 2 against Denmark on April 10, 2017. She participated in three matches of the 2017 UEFA Women's Under-19 Championship qualification Elite round Gr. 4. She played in three matches of the 2019 UEFA Women's Under-19 Championship qualification - Group 2 and then three games of the Elite round. She scored one goal against Cyprus.

In 2021, İncik was admitted to the Turkey team.

International goals ^{1}
Date	Venue	Opponent	Result	Competition	Scored
Turkey girls' U-17
2 October 2016	Rīgas Hanzas vidusskola Riga, Latvia	Wales	L 1–2	2017 UEFA Women's Under-17 Championship qualification Gr. 7	1
Turkey women U-19
6 October 2018	Arslan Zeki Demirci Sports Complex Manavgat, Antalya, Turkey	Cyprus	W 3–1	2019 UEFA Women's Under-19 Championship qualification - Gr. 2	1

- ^{1} Friendly matches not included

== Career statistics ==
As of match played 23 October 2022.

Club	Season	League			Continental		National		Total	
Club	Season	Division	Apps	Goals	Apps	Goals	Apps	Goals	Apps	Goals
1207 Antalyaspor	2014–15	Second League	12	3	–	–	1	0	13	3
1207 Antalyaspor	2015–16	First League	10	0	–	–	4	0	14	0
1207 Antalyaspor	2016–17	First League	23	0	–	–	4	1	27	1
1207 Antalyaspor	2017–18	First League	18	1	–	–	9	0	27	1
1207 Antalyaspor	2018–19	Second League	23	19	–	–	10	2	24	21
1207 Antalyaspor	Total		86	23	–	–	28	3	114	26
Konak Belediyespor	2019–20	First League	15	7	–	–	0	0	15	7
Konak Belediyespor	Total		15	7	–	–	0	0	15	7
Beşiktaş J.K.	2020–21	First League	3	0	0	0	0	0	3	0
Beşiktaş J.K.	2021–22	Super League	21	1	2	0	1	0	24	1
Beşiktaş J.K.	2022–23	Super League	2	0	0	0	0	0	2	0
Beşiktaş J.K.	Total		26	1	2	0	1	0	29	1
Career total			127	31	2	0	29	3	158	34

== Honours ==
Turkish Women's Second League

1207 Antalyaspor
Winners (1): 2014–15

Turkish Women's First League

Beşiktaş J.K.
Winners (1): 2020–21
