= Fulya Hakkı Yeten Facility =

Football stadium in Istanbul, Turkey

Fulya Hakkı Yeten Football Facility
- Beşiktaş J.K. Fulya Hakkı Yeten Futbol Altyapı Tesisleri
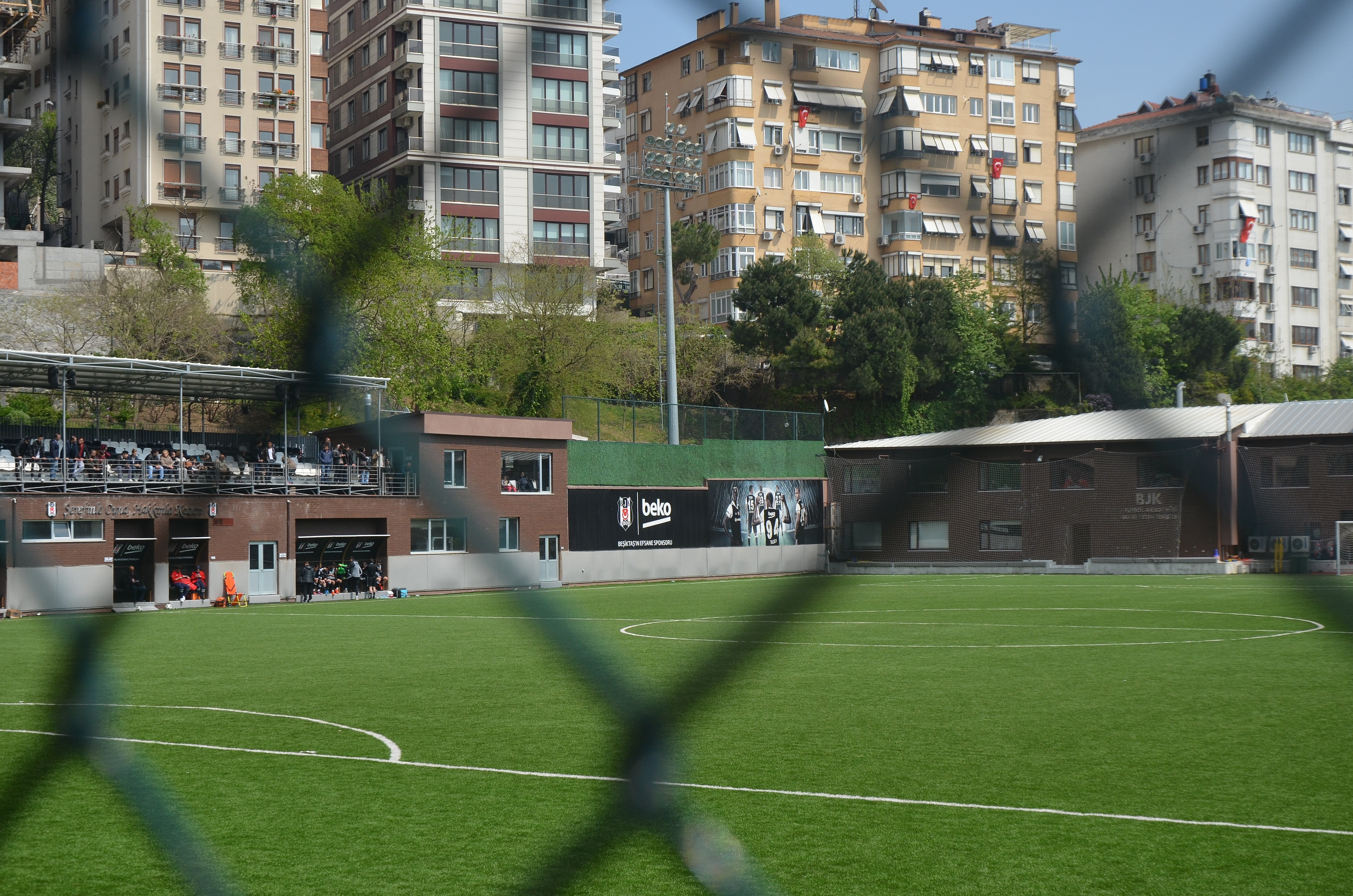

- Location within Istanbul
- Location: Fulya, Şişli, Istanbul, Turkey
- Coordinates: 41.05292°N 29.00128°E
- Owner: Beşiktaş J.K.
- Operator: Beşiktaş J.K.
- Capacity: 300
- Surface: Artificial turf

Construction
- Opened: 1990; 36 years ago

Fulya Hakkı Yeten Football Facility (Turkish: Beşiktaş J.K. Fulya Hakkı Yeten Futbol Altyapı Tesisleri) is a football stadium of the Beşiktaş J.K. sports club at Fulya neighborhood of Şişli district in Istanbul, Turkey.

The facility was named to honor Hakkı Yeten (1910–1989), former footballer, coach and president of Beşiktaş J.K. The facility was built in 1990. It has a covered area of 1,800 m^{2} (19,000 sq ft) It is capable of hosting 40 sportspeople.

The venue is home to football matches of the club's feeder teams. With effect of the 2019-20 Turkish Women's First Football League, the stadium hosts the matches of the Beşiktaş J.K. women's football team.

The stadium has an artificial turf ground. One covered grandstand's capacity is 300 spectators. It has floodlight installed.
