= Nemtsov =

Nemtsov (Russian: Немцо́в) is a surname of Russian origin. Its feminine form is Nemtsova (Russian: Немцо́ва). Notable people with this surname include:

- Boris Nemtsov (1959–2015), Russian scientist and politician
- Elis Nemtsov (born 2002), Israeli-born Canadian soccer player
- Grigorijs Ņemcovs (1948–2010), Latvian journalist
- Sarah Nemtsov (born 1980), German composer
- Stephanie Nemtsova (born 1998), American tennis player
- Tatyana Nemtsova (born 1946), Russian figure skater
- Zhanna Nemtsova (born 1984), Russian journalist and social activist
