= Kader Hançar =

Turkish footballer (born 1999)

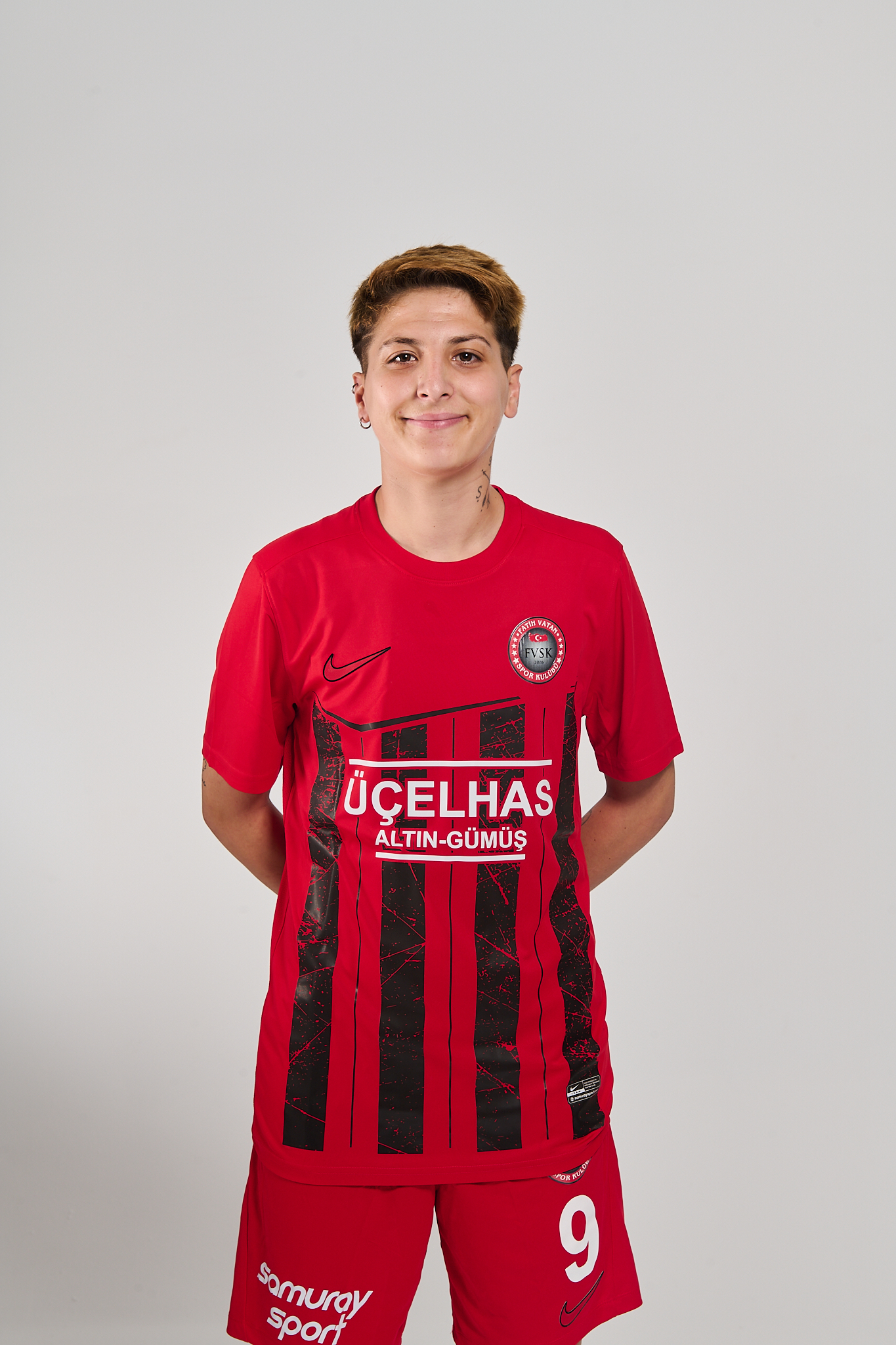
- Kader Hançar for Fatih Vatan Spor in 2023

Personal information
- Date of birth: November 12, 1999 (age 26)
- Place of birth: Kadıköy, Istanbul, Turkey
- Position: Striker

Team information
- Current team: Tijuana
- Number: 10

Senior career*
Years	Team	Apps	(Gls)
2013–2017	Ataşehir	58	(32)
2017–2019	Konak	33	(39)
2019	Beşiktaş	0	(0)
2019–2020	→Konak	8	(17)
2020	Osasuna	0	(0)
2020–2022	Beşiktaş	14	(8)
2022–2024	Fatih Vatan	35	(15)
2024–2025	Beylerbeyi	14	(14)
2025–	Tijuana	18	(9)

International career^{‡}
2012–2013	Turkey U-15	3	(4)
2014–2015	Turkey U-17	21	(9)
2014–2018	Turkey U-19	23	(10)
2018–	Turkey	40	(12)
- * Club domestic league appearances and goals as of 9 February 2026 ‡ National team caps and goals as of 9 October 2026

Kader Hançar (born 12 November 1999) is a Turkish professional footballer who plays as a striker for Liga MX Femenil side Tijuana and the Turkey women's national team.

== Club career ==
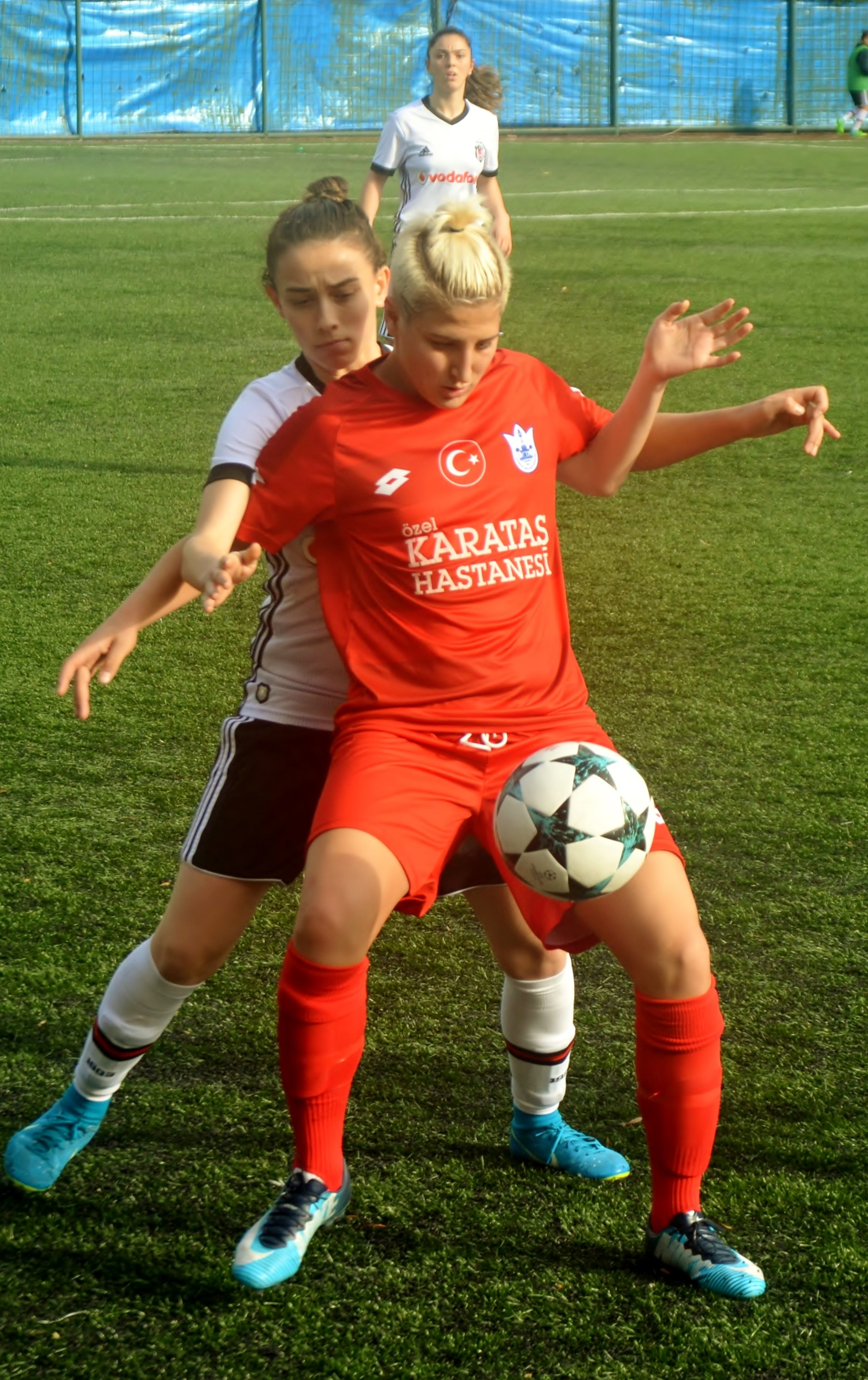
Kader Hançar (red) playing for Konak Belediyespor against Beşiktaş J.K. in the 2017–18 season's away match

Kader Hançar obtained her license on August 4, 2011. She debuted in the Turkish Women's First League on November 3, 2013, at the age of only 13.

Hançar plays futsal in her high school's team. She was part of the team representing Turkey at the 2014 ISF World Schools Futsal Championship held in Italy that became champion in the girls' category. She was the second-ranked top scorer of the tournament with 15 goals following her teammate Hilal Çetinkaya, who netted 17 goals.

Hançar transferred to the İzmir-based Konak Belediyespor, the rival team of Ataşehir Belediyespor, on August 18, 2017. She debuted at the UEFA Women's Champions League playing in the 2017–18 qualifying round held in Tbilisi, Georgie and scored two of the five goals of her team in the first match against WFC Martve. In the second game, she netted even a hat-trick of her team's five goals against the Slovak Partizán Bardejov. In the third game of the qualifying round with Gintra Universitetas from Lithuania, she scored the only goal of Konak Belediyespor, who lost by 1–3 and failed to advance further.

She was transferred by the 2018–19 Women's First League champion Beşiktaş J.K. to play in the 2019–20 UEFA Women's Champions League – Group 9 matches. She scored the only goal of her team in the first game against the Polish Górnik Łęczna. She netted also one goal against the Armenian Alashkert.

In the |2019–20 Women's First League season, she was loaned out from Beşiktaş J.K. to Konak Belediyespor, where she played the first half of the season only. Hançar moved then to Spain to join on 22 January 2020 the Pamplona-based Osasuna Femenino, where she plays in the Segunda División Pro. Following her team Beşiktaş J.K.'s champions title in the 2020–21 Turkcell League season, she played in two matches of the 2021–22 UEFA Women's Champions League qualifying rounds.

In December 2021, before the beginning of the 2021–22 Women's Super League, she underwent surgery on her right foot due to a calcaneal bone cyst with ankle medial malleolus.

For the 2022–23 Super League season, she transferred to Fatih Vatan Spor.

International goals
Date	Venue	Opponent	Competition	Result	Scored
Konak Belediyespor
August 22, 2017	Mikheil Meskhi Stadium Tbilisi, Georgia	(Georgia (country)) WFC Martve	2017–18 UEFA Women's Champions League qualifying round	W 5–0	2
August 25, 2017	David Petriashvili Stadium Tbilisi, Georgia	(Slovakia) Partizán Bardejov	2017–18 UEFA Women's Champions League qualifying round	W 5–1	3
August 28, 2017	David Petriashvili Stadium Tbilisi, Georgia	(Lithuania) Gintra Universitetas	2017–18 UEFA Women's Champions League qualifying round	L 1–3	1
Beşiktaş.
August 7, 2019	Sportpark Scheurserve, Enschede, Netherlands	(Poland) Górnik Łęczna	2019–20 UEFA Women's Champions League – Group 9	D 1–1	1
August 13, 2019	Sportpark Heeckeren, Enschede, Netherlands	(Armenia) Alashkert	2019–20 UEFA Women's Champions League – Group 9	W 3–0	1

== International career ==
After playing in the Turkey girls' national U-15 team's two friendly matches and scoring one goal, she was admitted to the Turkey U-17 team appearing in the friendly match against Greece on March 2, 2014. After scoring two goals in two games with the Turkey U-17, she was called up to the Turkey U-19 team. On March 18, 2014, she debuted in the Turkey U-19 team still at the age of 14. She played in three games of the 2015 UEFA Women's Under-17 Championship qualification- Elite round, and scored two goals.

Hançar appeared in three matches of the 2017 UEFA Women's Under-19 Championship qualification.

International goals(^{†})
Date	Venue	Opponent	Competition	Result	Scored
Turkey women's national under-17 football team
May 12, 2014	Centro Desportivo Da Madeira Ribeira Brava, Madeira, Portugal	Portugal	UEFA Development Cup	D 2–2	1
October 16, 2014	Boris Trajkovski Stadium, Skopje, Macedonia	Kazakhstan	2015 UEFA Women's Under-17 Championship qualification	W 5–0	2
October 18, 2014	FFM Training Centre, Skopje, Macedonia	North Macedonia	2015 UEFA Women's Under-17 Championship qualification	W 5–0	1
April 11, 2015	Tarsus Stadium, Tarsus, Mersin, Turkey	Finland	2015 UEFA Women's Under-17 Championship qualification- Elite round	W 2–1	2
May 3, 2015	National Sports Complex Shefayim, Israel	Israel	UEFA Women's Under-16 Development Tournament	L 1–4	1
Turkey women's national under-19 football team
October 21, 2017	Király Sportlétesítmény Szombathely, Hungary	Armenia	2018 UEFA Women's Under-19 Championship qualification – Group 10	W 5–0	1
April 8, 2018	Turners Cross Cork, Ireland	Republic of Ireland	2018 UEFA Women's Under-19 Championship qualification – Elite round Group 4	W 2–0	1

(^{†}): Friendly matches not included

=== International goals ===
No.	Date	Venue	Opponent	Score	Result	Competition
1.	11 November 2018	Basa Technical Center, Tbilisi, Georgia	Georgia	5–0	5–0	Friendly
2.	14 June 2019	CSR Orhei, Orhei, Moldova	Moldova	2–0	2–0	Friendly
3.	17 January 2020	Centenary Stadium, Ta'Qali, Malta	Malta	2–1	2–1	Friendly
4.	12 November 2022	Emirhan Sport Complex, Manavgat, Turkey	Jordan	6–0	7–0	Friendly
5.	15 November 2022	Emirhan Sport Complex, Manavgat, Turkey	Jordan	3–0	5–0	Friendly
6.	16 July 2024	Ménfői úti Stadion, Győr, Hungary	Hungary	4–1	4–1	UEFA Women's Euro 2025 qualifying League
7.	30 May 2025	Esenler Stadium, Istanbul, Turkey	Republic of Ireland	1–0	1–2	2025 UEFA Women's Nations League
8.	3 June 2025	Theodoros Vardinogiannis Stadium, Heraklion, Greece	Greece	1–0	1–0	2025 UEFA Women's Nations League
9.	24 October 2025	Fadil Vokrri Stadium, Pristina, Kosovo	Kosovo	1–0	4–0	2025 UEFA Women's Nations League play-off matches
10.	24 October 2025	Fadil Vokrri Stadium, Pristina, Kosovo	Kosovo	2–0	4–0	2025 UEFA Women's Nations League play-off matches
11.	28 October 2025	Gürsel Aksel Stadium, İzmir, Turkey	Kosovo	2–0	3–0	2025 UEFA Women's Nations League play-off matches
12.	9 October 2026	Pendik Stadium, Istanbul, Turkey	Slovenia	1–0	3–3	2027 FIFA Women's World Cup qualification play-offs

== Career statistics ==
As of 6 October 2024.

Club	Season	League			Continental		National		Total	
Club	Season	Division	Apps	Goals	Apps	Goals	Apps	Goals	Apps	Goals
Ataşehir	2012–13	First League	0	0	–	–	1	3	1	3
Ataşehir	2013–14	First League	10	2	–	–	13	4	23	6
Ataşehir	2014–15	First League	15	5	–	–	14	8	29	13
Ataşehir	2015–16	First League	15	7	–	–	2	0	17	7
Ataşehir	2016–17	First League	18	18	–	–	3	0	21	18
Ataşehir	Total		58	32	–	–	33	15	91	47
Konak	2017–18	First League	19	29	3	6	14	8	36	43
Konak	2018–19	First League	14	10	0	0	6	2	20	12
Konak	Total		33	39	3	6	20	10	56	55
Beşiktaş	2019–20	First League	0	0	3	2	0	0	3	2
→Konak	2019–20	First League	8	17	0	0	5	1	13	18
Osasuna	2019–20	Segunda División Pro					0	0	0	0
Beşiktaş	2020–21	First League	2	2	–	–	0	0	2	2
Beşiktaş	2021–22	Super League	12	6	2	0	3	0	17	6
Beşiktaş	Total		14	8	2	0	3	0	19	8
Fatih Vatan	2022–23	Super League	14	1	–	–	4	2	18	3
Fatih Vatan	2023–24	Super League	16	7	–	–	1	0	17	7
Fatih Vatan	2024–25	Super League	5	1	–	–	1	1	6	2
Fatih Vatan	Total		35	9	–	–	6	3	41	12
Career total			148	105	8	8	67	29	223	142

== Honours ==
Turkish Women's First League

Ataşehir Belediyespor
Runners-up (3): 2013–14, 2014–15, 2015–16
Third places (1): 2016–17

Konak Belediyespor
Third places (1): 2017–18, 2018–19

Beşiktaş J.K.
Winners (1): 2020–21
