= Inês Maia =

Portuguese footballer

Maria Inês Vieira Maia (born 17 June 1999) is a Portuguese footballer who plays as a midfielder for Turkish Women's Football Super League club Beşiktaş J.K. and the Portugal U23 women's national team. Maia studied for a degree in accounting alongside her football career.
