= Beşiktaş J.K. (women's football) =

- Beşiktaş J.K.
- Full name: Beşiktaş J.K. Kadın Futbol Takımı
- Nickname: Dişi Kartallar
- Founded: 2014; 12 years ago
- Ground: İBB GOP Halit Kıvanç City Stadium
- Capacity: 5,000
- Coordinates: 41.08760°N 28.91658°E
- Chairman: Serdal Adalı
- Manager: Didem Karagenç
- League: Turkish Women's Football Super League
- 2025–26: 6th
Home colours	Away colours	Third colours

Beşiktaş Women's Football (Turkish: Beşiktaş JK Kadın Futbol Takımı) is the women football section of Beşiktaş JK, a major sports club in Istanbul, Turkey.

== History ==
In the 2014–15 season, Beşiktaş women's team was allocated to the bottom league, the Turkish Women's Third Football League. They finished the league as the division leader, and were promoted to the Women's Second League after play-offs.

In the 2015–16 season, the team played in the Women's Second League, and secured promotion to the First League already four matches before the season's finish. They became league champion two matches prior to the end of the league. The team completed the 2015–16 season undefeated, and were promoted to the Turkish Women's First Football League.

The team finished the regular season of 2017–18 even on points with Konak Belediyespor behind the champion Ataşehir Belediyespor. The regular time of the play-off match between the two teams ended with 1–1 draw. In the extension time, Beşiktaş J.K. scored three penalty goals, finished the match by 4–1, and became runners-up.

Beşiktaş J.K. finished the 2018–19 Women's First League season as leader equal on points with ALG Spor with goal average that happened only in the last round. ALG Spor was leading with goal average in the previous two rounds. ALG Spor won their last match with 5-1, Beşiktaş J.K. defeated their opponent by 9-0, which enabled them a goal average of four in the final. The Turkish Football Federation set a play-off round between the two teams to be played on 12 May 2019 at a neutral venue, in Manavgat, Antalya. The team became for the first tine Women's First League champion after defeating ALG Spor in the play-off match with 1-0.

By the end of July 2019, the club transferred Kader Hançar, Sevgi Çınar, Sevgi Salmanlı and Yağmur Uraz, the four most experienced forwarders of the Women's football in Turkey, three of them are former top scorers, for the 2019–20 UEFA Women's Champions League - Group 9 matches. The team finished the qualifying round's group matches undefeated with two draws and one win ranking second behind the Dutch Twente, who progressed to the round of 32 as the only team of the group.

In the 2021-22 season, the mobile phone company Vodafone Turkey started sponsoring the women's team. Beşiktaş J.K. won in the 2020-21 Turkcell Women's Football League season their second champion title defeating Fatih Vatan Spor in the play-off final game.

In the 2022-23 season, the team finished the league in 4th place and qualified for the playoffs. The team eliminated 1207 Antalyaspor in the first round. In the quarter finals, the team was eliminated by ALG and said goodbye to the playoffs.

In 2023-24 season, United Payment started sponsoring the women's team. The team, which started the season with Suat Okyar, collected 20 points in 12 matches and remained below the 2 point average. After the Hakkarigücüspor match, Suat Okyar resigned and his assistant-coach Burak Sidar was brought in temporarily. Burak Sidar collected a total of 39 points with an average of 2.2 points. A sudden decision was made not to continue with Burak Sidar and the technical staff whose term of office had expired.

In the 2024-25 season, the team started the season badly and got 1 point from their first 3 matches. But then they won all 3 derbies they played in the first half (Trabzonspor, Galatasaray, Fenerbahçe). The match against Galatasaray was played at Beşiktaş JK Stadium and nearly 12,000 people watched the match at the stadium. In 2024, Losing points in derbies and critical matches in the second half of the season in 6 matches caused them to fall out of the championship race. They finished the league in 3rd place. At the end of the season, before the end of the contract period, Mesut Kır and her staff parted ways.

== Stadium ==
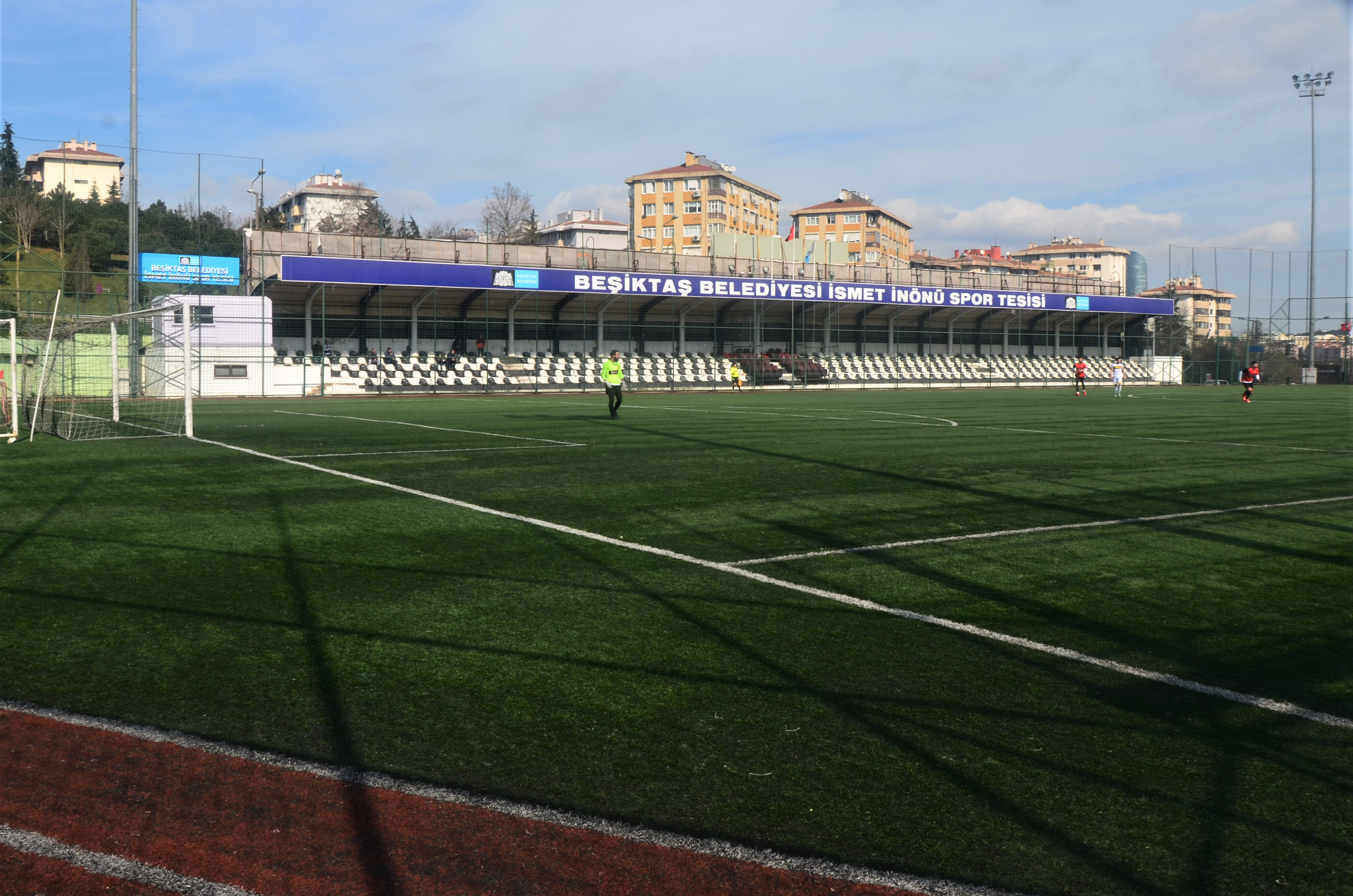
İsmet İnönü Stadium, old home ground of Beşiktaş J.K. women's tea until the end of the 2018-19 Women's First League season.

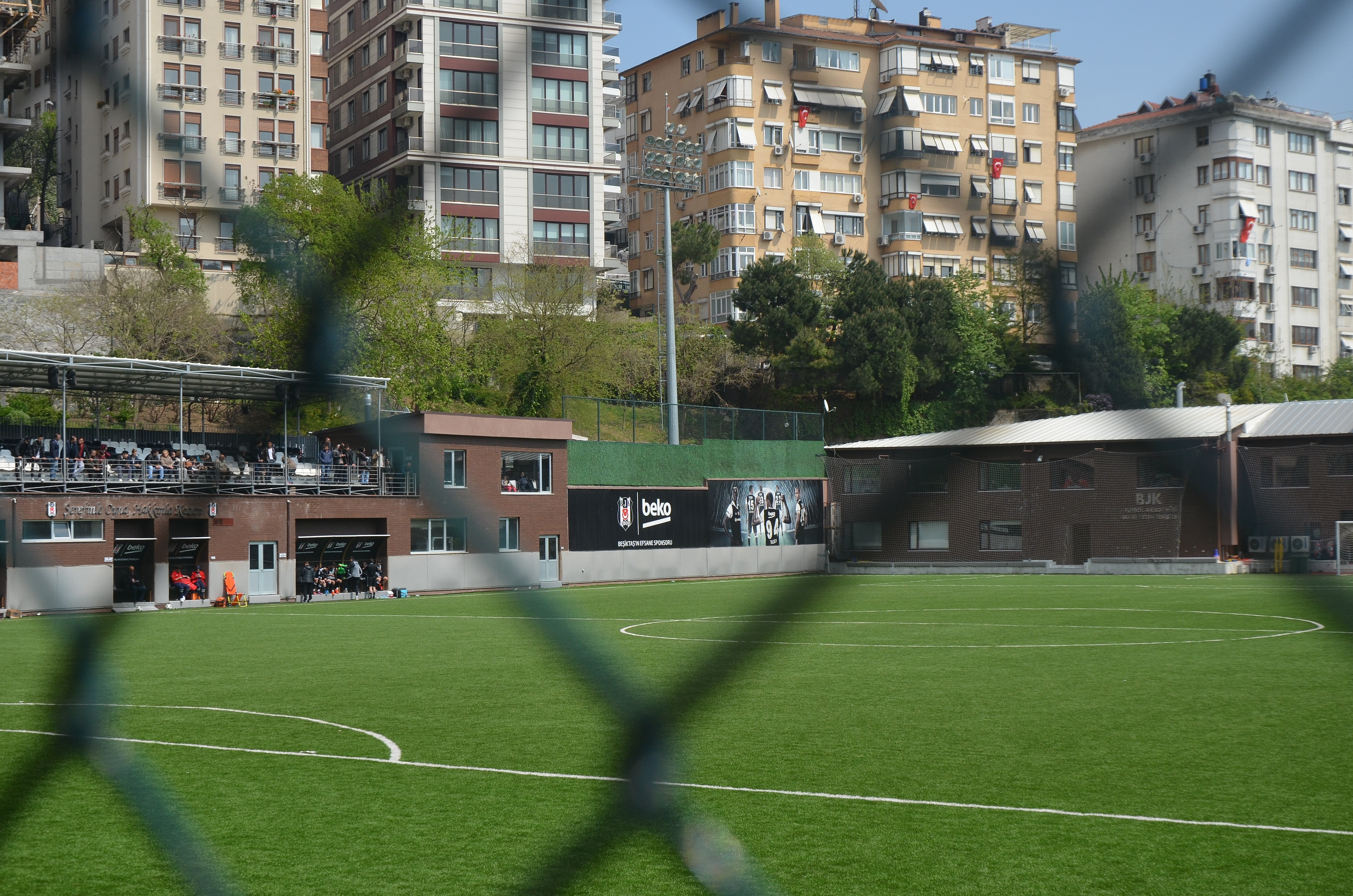
Fulya Hakkı Yeten Stadium, home ground from the 2019-20 Women's First League season on.

Beşiktaş JK women's team played their home matches at Fulya Hakkı Yeten Stadium of the Beşiktaş J.K. in Şişli district of Istanbul. The team played their home matches until the end of the 2018-19 Women's First League season at İsmet İnönü Stadium, formerly Çilekli Stadium, of Beşiktaş Municipality, in Beşiktaş district.

The team has played its home matches at the İBB GOP Halit Kıvanç City Stadium in the Gaziosmanpaşa district of Istanbul since the 2023-24 Super League season.

== Statistics ==
As of 22 May 2026.

Season	League	Rank	Pld	W	D	L	GF	GA	GD	Pts
2014–15	Third League Group 1	1	18	14	2	2	89	18	+71	44
2015–16	Second League	1	22	19	3	0	88	20	+68	60
2016–17	First League	2	26	19	1	6	67	22	+45	58
2017–18	First League	2	19	14	3	2	47	23	+24	45
2018–19	First League	1	19	14	3	2	62	13	+49	45
2019–20	First League	2 (^{1})	15	14	0	1	64	12	+52	42
2020-21	First League	1	6	6	0	0	23	3	+20	18
2021-22	Super League Gr. A	4 (^{2})	26	21	0	5	110	24	+86	63
2022-23	Super League Gr. A	4	16	6	6	4	33	18	+15	24
2022-23	Play-offs	QF	4	2	1	1	8	4	+4	7
2023-24	Super League	4	30	19	2	9	71	29	+42	59
2024-25	Super League	3	26	17	2	7	48	27	+21	53
2025-26	Super League	6	30	17	5	8	93	32	+61	56
Green marks a season followed by promotion, red a season followed by relegation.

- (^{1}): Season discontinue due to COVID-19 pandemic in Turkey
- (^{2}): Finish Gr. A as second, placed 4th after play-offs
- (^{3}): Season in progress

== Players ==
=== Current squad ===
As of 1 October 2026.

Head coach: Didem Karagenç

Note: Flags indicate national team as defined under FIFA eligibility rules; some limited exceptions apply. Players may hold more than one non-FIFA nationality.

No.	Pos.	Nation	Player
1	GK	TUR	Selda Akgöz (C)
26	GK	TUR	İrem Damla Şahin
2	DF	TUR	Berna Yeniçeri
4	DF	NGR	Glory Ogbonna
5	DF	TUR	Meryem Küçükbirinci
13	DF	TUR	Ece Tekmen
21	DF	TUR	Damla Bozyel
23	DF	AZE	Yeliz Açar
99	DF	UKR	Yana Derkach

No.	Pos.	Nation	Player
7	MF	BRA	Rafaela dos Santos
8	MF	TUR	Nihal Saraç
10	MF	CMR	Fadimatou Kome (VC)
17	MF	TUR	İlayda Civelek
18	MF	TUR	Ecemnur Öztürk
20	MF	TUR	Cansu Nur Kaya
22	MF	ALG	Amira Ould Braham
53	MF	ALB	Mesuare Begallo
77	MF	TUR	Sevgi Çınar Karaoğlu
9	FW	SRB	Milica Popović
11	FW	MNE	Jelena Karličić
19	FW	AZE	Esra Manya
27	FW	TUR	Birgül Sadıkoğlu

=== Former players ===
Former Turkish international and foreign players

- Turkey: Derya Arhan, Ayşe Şevval Ay, Çiğdem Belci, Dilek Enli, Emine Ecem Esen, Seda Nur İncik, Fatma Kara, Safa Merve Nalçacı, Ceren Nurlu, Melike Öztürk, Esra Erol, Sevgi Salman, Gamze Nur Yaman, Şevval Dursun, Sema Polat, Münevver Rençber, Zeynep Gamze Koçer, Birsen Bozbal, Beyza Kara, Berivan İçen, Fatma Şahin, Tuğçe Bayındır, Sibel Duman, Ferda Çevik, Sevgi Çınar, Kevser Kartal, Mesude Alayont, Tülin Kuyucak, Kezban Tağ, Nur Yuntur, Elif Keskin, Gizem Gönültaş, Elife Karabulut, Ezgi Çağlar, Başak Gündoğdu, Didem Karagenç, Beyza Semercioğlu, Defnesu Aldemir, Gülbin Hız, Nehir Zeytünlü, Meryem Cennet Çal, Büşra Kenet
- Algeria: Aïcha Hamidèche
- Australia: Princess Ibini-Isei
- Azerbaijan: Bilge Su Koyun
- Bosnia and Herzegovina: Minela Gačanica, Marija Aleksić
- Brazil: Gi Santos
- Bulgaria: Evdokia Popadinova
- Cameroon: Jacquette Ada
- Canada: Christabel Oduro
- Cape Verde: Evy Pereira
- Colombia: Yessica Rodríguez, Vanessa Córdoba
- England: Shameeka Fishley
- Ghana: Vivian Adjei
- Greece: Ioanna Chamalidou
- Hungary: Sára Pusztai
- Iran: Maryam Yektaei
- Israel: Elis Nemtsov
- Ivory Coast: Ines Nrehy, Aminata Haidara
- Kenya: Cynthia Musungu
- Kosovo: Donjeta Halilaj
- Macedonia: Eli Jakovska
- Mali: Aissata Traoré
- Mexico: Sofia Alvarez
- Morocco: Imane Abdelahad, Chirine Knaidil
- Nigeria: Vivian Ikechukwu
- Portugal: Tânia Mateus, Inês Maia, Ana Teles, Lara Pintassilgo
- Romania: Teodora Nicoară
- Russia: Ekaterina Ulasevich
- Tanzania: Opah Clement
- Ukraine: Khrystyna Pereviznyk, Tetyana Kozyrenko
- United States: Jessica Lynne Çarmıklı

== Staff ==
Note: Flags indicate national team as defined under FIFA eligibility rules; some limited exceptions apply. Players may hold more than one non-FIFA nationality.

No.	Pos.	Nation	Player
—	Team Director	TUR	Tuncay Yanık
—	Operation Director	TUR	Nergiz Bulut
—	External Relations	TUR	Başak Gündoğdu

=== Technical staff ===
Note: Flags indicate national team as defined under FIFA eligibility rules; some limited exceptions apply. Players may hold more than one non-FIFA nationality.

No.	Pos.	Nation	Player
—	Head Coach	TUR	Didem Karagenç
—	Assistant Coach	TUR	Oğuz Sargın
—	Fitness Coach	TUR	Alper Çıkıkçı
—	Goalkeeping Coach	TUR	Samet Eğribel
—	Data Analyst	TUR	Arzum Ercan
—	Physiotherapist	TUR	Yağmur Özçelik
—	Massage Therapist	TUR	Ülker Balta
—	Interpreter	TUR	Burak Cantürk
—	Kit Manager	TUR	Ömer Çakır
—	Academy Director	TUR	Sabri Can Metin
—	Media Officer	TUR	Rahime İçen
—	Nutritionist	TUR	Selin Çetinsöz

== International results ==
Event	Stage	Date	Venue	Opponent	Result	Scorers
2019–20 UEFA Women's Champions League	QR; Group 9; 2nd	Aug 7, 2019	Enschede, Netherlands	(Poland) Górnik Łęczna	D 1–1	Hançar
2019–20 UEFA Women's Champions League	QR; Group 9; 2nd	Aug 10, 2019	Enschede, Netherlands	(Netherlands) Twente	D 2–2	Uraz, Keskin
2019–20 UEFA Women's Champions League	QR; Group 9; 2nd	Aug 13, 2019	Enschede, Netherlands	(Armenia) FC Alashkert	W 3–0	Hançar, Sakhinova (o.g.), Çınar
2021–22 UEFA Women's Champions League	Q1; Group 8; 3rd	Aug 18, 2021	Turin, Italy	(Austria) St. Pölten	L 0–7	
2021–22 UEFA Women's Champions League	Q1; Group 8; 3rd	Aug 21, 2021	Turin, Italy	(North Macedonia) Kamenica Sasa	W 4–0	Uraz, A. Karabulut, İçen, Hançar

=== Ranking history ===
Season	Rank	Points	Ref.
2019–20	79 ▲	4.475	
2020–21	85 ▼	3.500	
2021–22	83 ▲	5.100	
2022–23	90 ▼	5.000	
2023–24	88 ▲	5.000	
2024–25	104 ▼	3.400	
2025–26	109 ▼	2.500	

== Honours ==
- Turkish Women's First Football League
  - Champions (2): 2018–19, 2020–21
  - Runners-up (2): 2016–17, 2017–18
- Turkish Women's Second Football League
  - Champions (1): 2015–16
- Turkish Women's Third Football League
  - Champions (1): 2014–15

== Kit history ==
2015–16 home	2015–16 away	2016–17 home	2016–17 away	2017–18 home	2017–18 away
2018–19 home	2018–19 away	2018–19 alt	2019–20 home	2019–20 away	2019–20 alt
2020–21 home	2020–21 away	2021–22 home	2022–23 home	2022–23 away	2022–23 alt

== Squad history ==
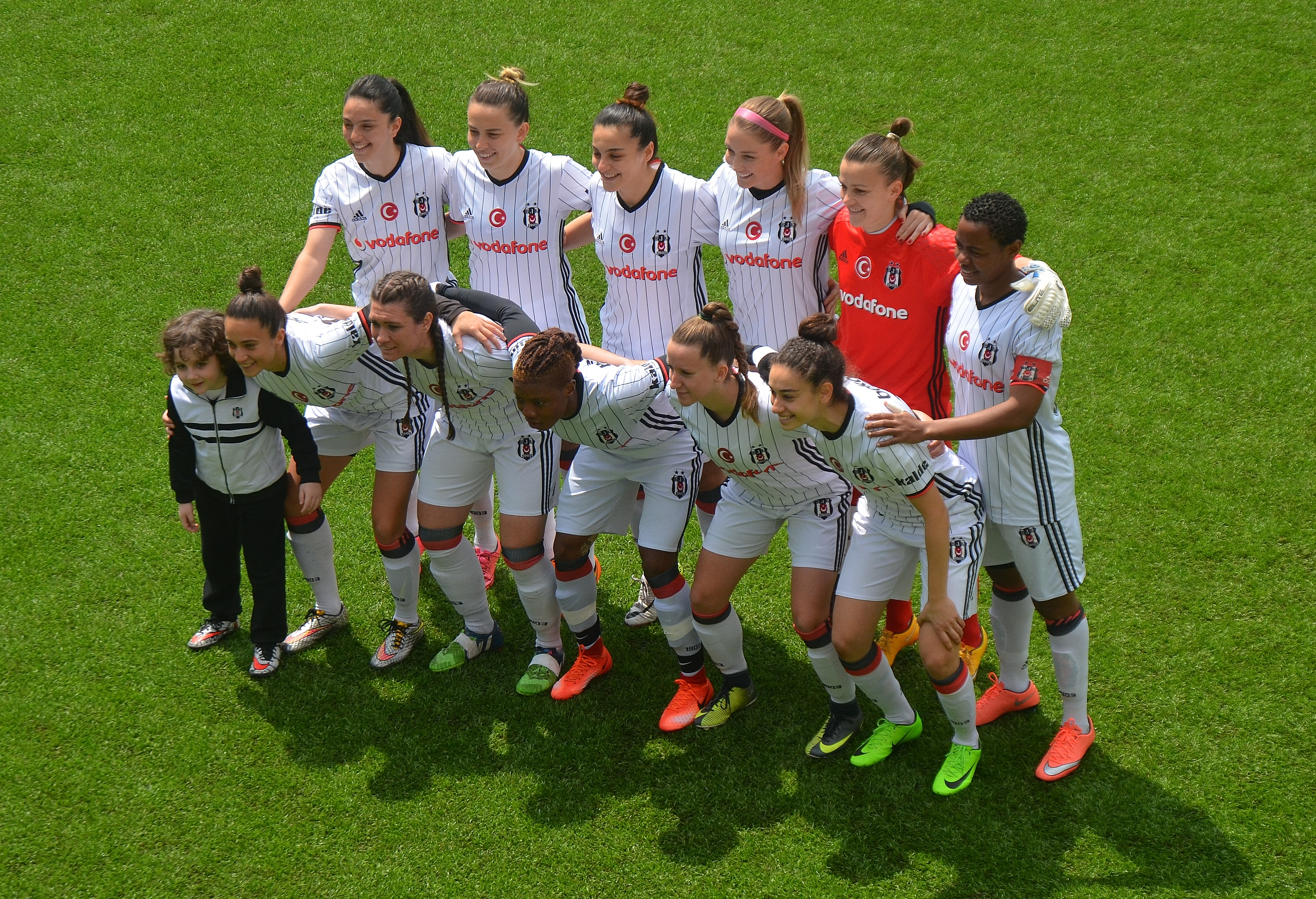
Beşiktaş J.K. team in the play-off home match against 1207 Antalya Spor in the 2016–17 season.

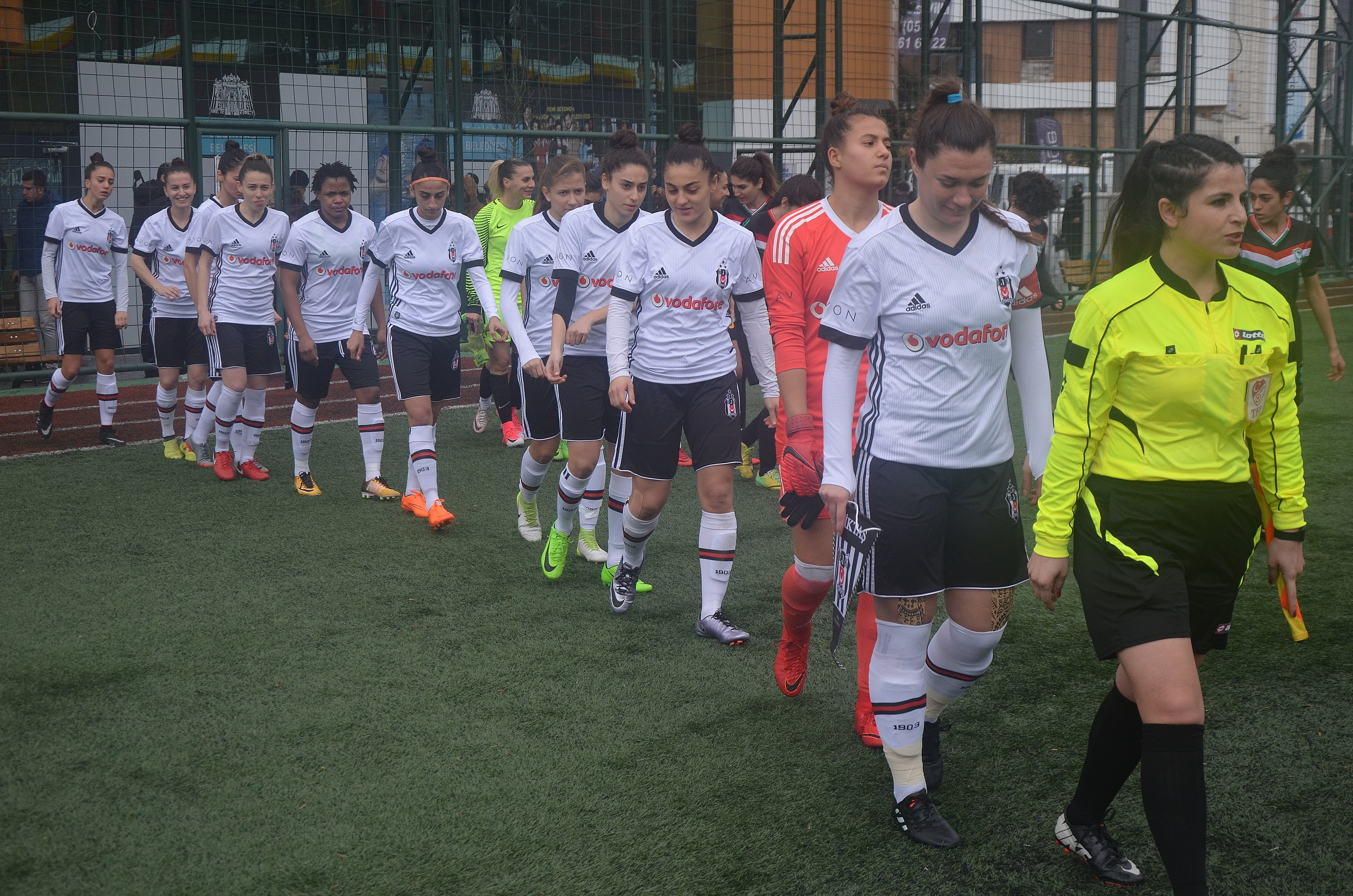
Beşiktaş J.K. squad in the 2017–18 Women's First League season's home match against Amed S.K.

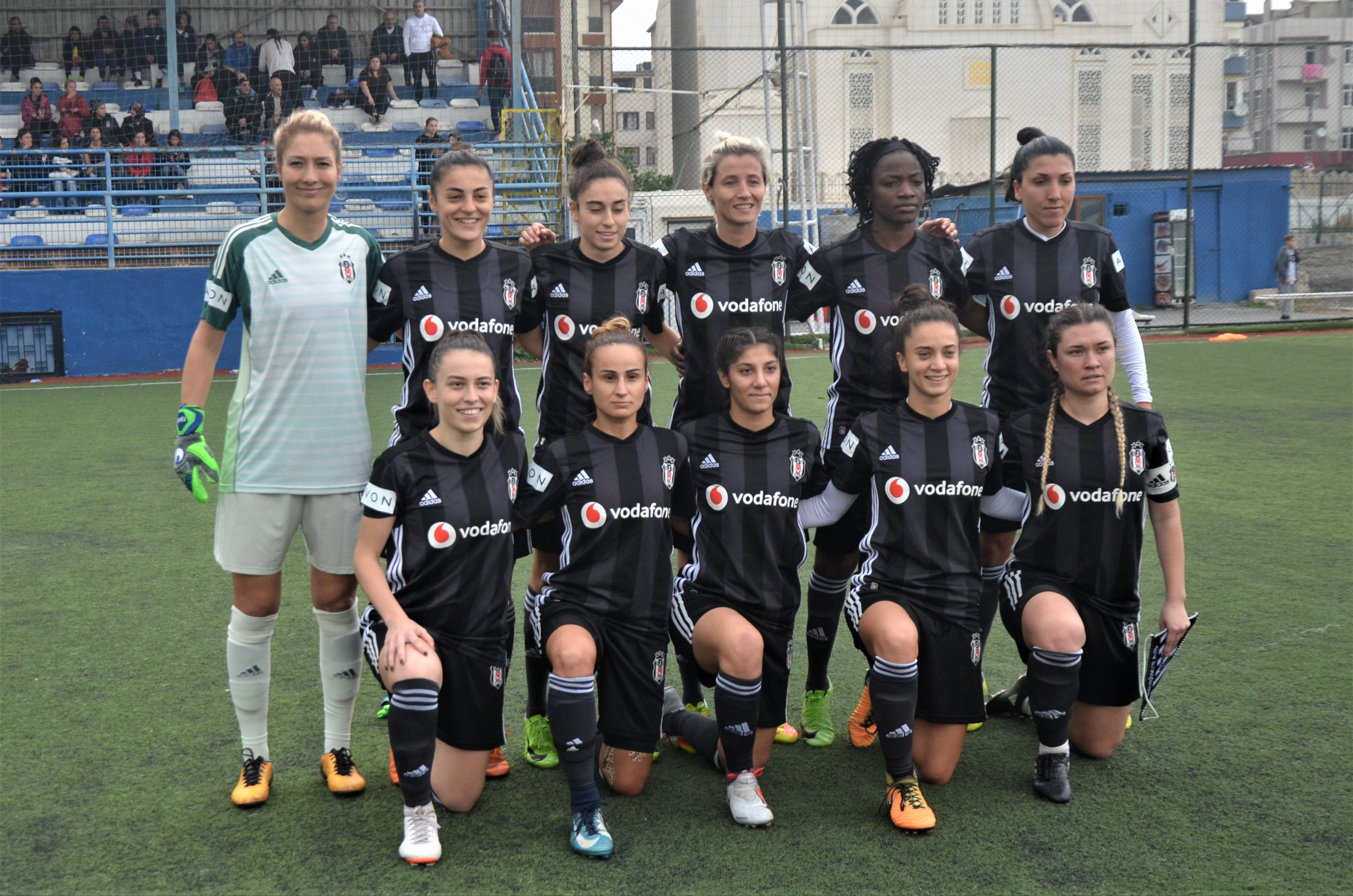
Beşiktaş J.K. women's team in the 2018–19 First League season's away match against Ataşehir Belediyespor.

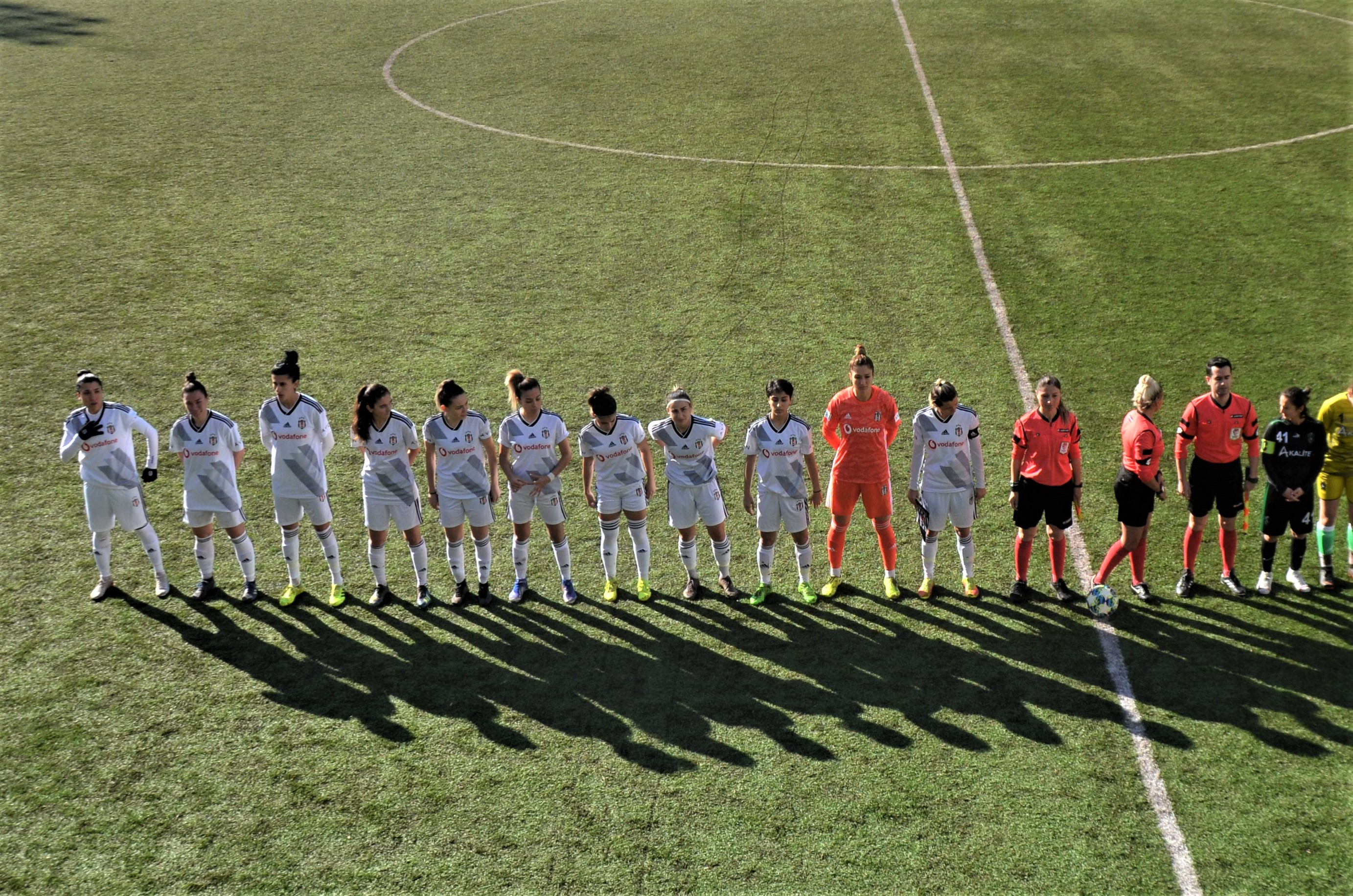
Beşiktaş J.K. women's team in the 2019–20 First League season's home match against Kocaeli Bayan FK.

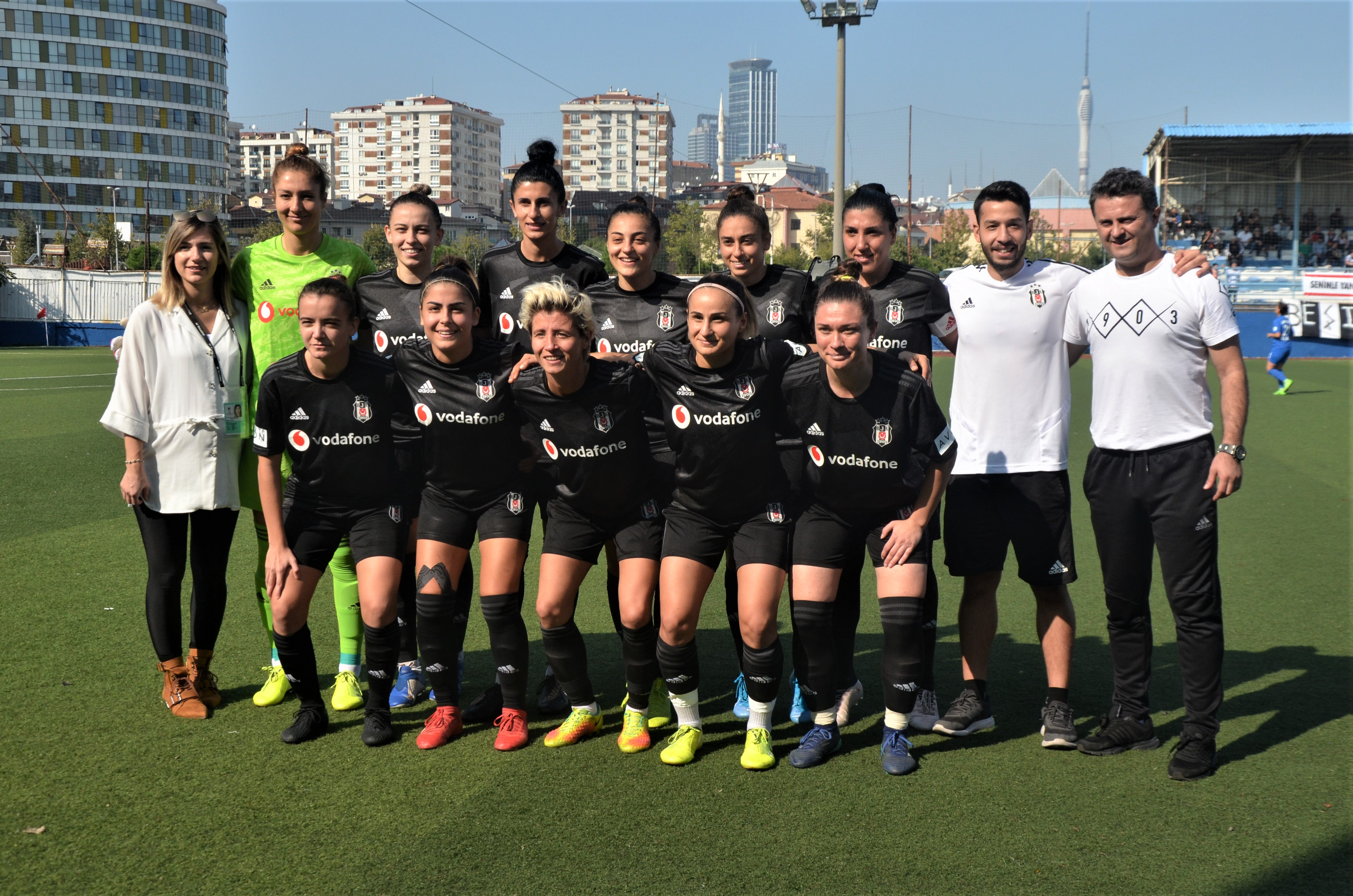
Beşiktaş J.K. women's team in the 2019–20 First League season's home match against Ataşehir Belediyespor.
