= Elis Nemtsov =

Canadiian soccer player (born 2002)

Personal information
- Date of birth: January 14, 2002 (age 24)
- Place of birth: Haifa, Israel
- Height: 5 ft 6 1/2 in (1.69 m)
- Position: Forward

Team information
- Current team: Beşiktaş
- Number: 25

Youth career
- 2019: Vaughan Azzurri

College career
Years	Team	Apps	(Gls)
2020–2021	Memphis Tigers		
2021–2023	Georgia Southern Eagles	49	(16)

Senior career*
Years	Team	Apps	(Gls)
2022–2024	Tormenta		
2024–	Beşiktaş	10	(3)

International career
- Israel U17
- Israel U19
- * Club domestic league appearances and goals as of 22 December 2024

Elis Nemtsov (Hebrew: אליס נמצוב; born January 14, 2002) is an Israeli-born Canadian professional women's soccer forward who plays in the Turkish Super League for Beşiktaş. She played for the Israel U17 and Israel U19 teams.

== Personal life ==
Elis Nemtsov was born to Olga (née Troyansky) and Alex Nemtsov in Haifa, Israel on January 14, 2002. The family moved to Canada, and settled in Bradford, Ontario. She is the oldest of 4 children, with a twin brother Ron, and two younger siblings, brother Liran and sister Eden.

She completed her secondary education at Bradford District High School in her hometown. In 2020, she enrolled in University of Memphis in Tennessee, United States. In 2021, she transferred to Georgia Southern University in Statesboro, Georgia, She majored in information systems.

== Early years in soccer ==
In 2019, Nemtsov played in the League1 Ontario for Vaughan Azzurri in Vaughan, Ontario.

During her freshman year in 2021 at the University of Memphis, she was a member of the college soccer team Memphis Tigers.

After transferring to Georgia Southern University, she started to play for the Georgia Southern Eagles women's soccer team in the 2021–22 season. She appeared in a total of 49 matches, and scored 16 goals including four game-winning goals in three seasons. In 2022, she was her college team's top goalscorer with seven goals. She was a three-time first team All-Sun Belt Conference selection in 2021, 2022 and 2023.

== Club career ==
Nemtsov is 5 ft 6 1/2 in (1.69 m) tall. She plays in the forward position.

=== Tormenta ===
In three summer seasons between 2022 and 2024 while still at the university and later, she played in the USL W League for the local professional club Tormenta. She played an important role in her team's champions title of the 2022 USL W League season. In 2024, she was named "Tormenta FC W League May Player of the Month".

=== Beşiktaş ===
In July 2024, Nemtsov moved to Turkey, and signed a one-year professional deal with the Istanbul-based club Beşiktaş to play in the Super League. Already during her first game in the 2024-25 Super league season on September 8, she suffered ankle sprain, which caused her to stay away from the field the next match.

== International career ==
Nemtsov was part of the Israel U17 and Israel U19 teams. In September 2020, she was called up to the Israel women's team camp.

== Honors ==
Sun Belt Conference

Georgia Southern Eagles
Runners-up (1): 2021

USL W League

Tormenta
Champions (1): 2022
