= İsmet İnönü Stadium =

Football stadium

- Beşiktaş Belediyesi İsmet İnönü Spor Tesisi
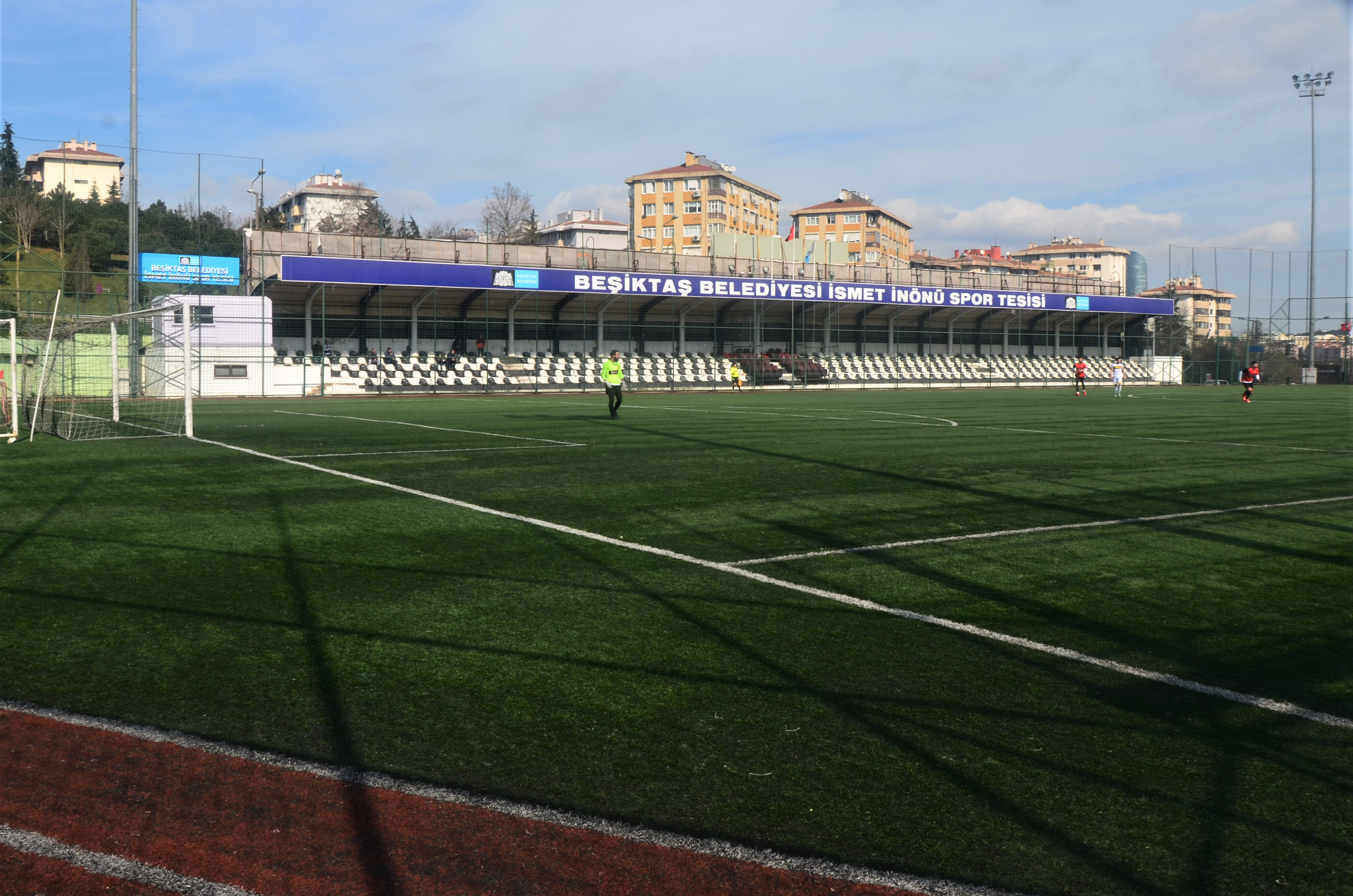

- Location within Istanbul
- Location: Beşiktaş, Istanbul, Turkey
- Coordinates: 41.08817°N 29.01819°E
- Owner: Beşiktaş Municipality
- Operator: Beltaş
- Capacity: 800
- Surface: Artificial turf

Construction
- Opened: 2001

İsmet İnönü Stadium (Turkish: Beşiktaş Belediyesi İsmet İnönü Spor Tesisi), formerly Çilekli Football Field (Turkish: Beşiktaş Belediyesi Çilekli Spor Tesisleri), is a football stadium of the Beşiktaş municipality at 4. Levent neighborhood of Beşiktaş district in Istanbul, Turkey.

It was built in 2001. Owned by the district municipality of Beşiktaş, it is operated by Beltaş. The facility has an 800-seat capacity. The field's surface is artificial turf. It has floodlights installed.

The Beşiktaş women's football team play some of their home matches at Çilekli Football Field.

The stadium was renamed to honor Turkish statesman İsmet İnönü (1884–1973) by a decision of the Beşiktaş municipal council in April 2018. The venue is home to football matches of the Turkish Amateur Football Leagues.
