= 2019–20 Turkish Women's First Football League =

Turkish Women's First Football League
- Season: 2019–20
- Dates: 20 October 2019 – 3 May 2020 (discontinued after 8 March 2020)
- Champions: ALG Spor 1st title
- Promoted: Adana İdmanyurduspor; Fomget Gençlik ve Spor; Kocaeli Bayan FK
- Relegated: None
- Champions League: ALG Spor
- Matches: 92
- Goals: 395 (4.29 per match)
- Top goalscorer: (Turkey) Yağmur Uraz (27 goals)
- Biggest home win: Konak Belediyespor 11-0 Fomget GS (12 January 2020)
- Biggest away win: Amed S.K. 1-11 Konak Belediyespor (24 November 2019)
- Highest scoring: Beşiktaş J.K. 10-2 Kireçburnu Spor (17 November 2019), Amed S.K.1-11 Konak Belediyespor (24 November 2019)
- Longest winning run: 10 - ALG Spor (20 October 2019 - 5 January 2020), Beşiktaş J.K. (1 December 2019 - 1 March 2020)
- Longest unbeaten run: 15 - ALG Spor (20 October 2019 - 1 March 2020)
- Longest winless run: 14 - Fomget GSr (20 October 2019 - 23 February 2020)
- Longest losing run: 7 - Adana İdmanyurduspor (29 December 2019 - 1 March 2020)
- All statistics correct as of 8 July 2020.

The 2019–20 season of the Turkish Women's First Football League is the 24th season of Turkey's premier women's football league.

The league season started with the first week matches on 20 October 2019, and the regular season will conclude with the 22nd week matches on 3 May 2020. The number of participating teams was increased from ten to twelve again after eight seasons. Trabzon İdmanocağı was relegated after the previous season due to not show-up. The promoted Women's Second League teams are Adana İdmanyurduspor of Adana, Fomget Gençlik ve Spor from Ankara and Kocaeli Bayan FK of İzmit. Four teams from Istanbul continue to take part in the 2019–20 season.

On 19 March 2020, Youth and Sports Minister Mehmet Kasapoğlu announced that following a meeting with the federation presidents all men's and women's football, basketball, volleyball and handball leagues were postponed as part of the precautionary measures taken in context with the COVID-19 pandemic in Turkey.

On 8 July 2020, the Turkish Football Federation's board of directors decided that the 2019–20 "Özge Kanbay Season" matches of all three women's football leagues not to be played further due to the COVID-19 outbreak in Turkey. The following decisions were made for the 2019–20 Turkish Women's First Football League season:

1. The League is registered according to the current score ranking on the date when it was decided not to be played
2. No champion team is declared
3. No relegation of teams to the Turkish Women's Second Football League will take place
4. No prizes will be awarded to the champion, runner-up and the third placed teams
5. ALG Spor, which ranked at the top of the league according to the current ranking, represented Turkey at the 2020–21 UEFA Women's Champions League

== Teams ==
=== Team changes ===
| Relegated from 2018–19 First League | Promoted from 2018–19 Second League |
|---|---|
| Trabzon İdmanocağı | Adana İdmanyurduspor; Fomget Gençlik ve Spor; Kocaeli Bayan FK |

Location of teams in the 2019–20 season of Turkish Women's First Football League

Season 2019–20
| Team | Hometown | Ground | Capacity | 2017–18 finish |
|---|---|---|---|---|
| Adana İdmanyurduspor | Adana | Gençlik Stadium | 2,000 | 3rd (Second League) |
| ALG Spor | Gaziantep | Batur Stadium | | 2nd |
| Amed Sportif Faaliyetler | Diyarbakır | Talaytepe Sports Facility | | 7th |
| Ataşehir Belediyespor | Istanbul | Yeni Sahra Stadium | 700 | 4th |
| Beşiktaş J.K. | Istanbul | İsmet İnönü Stadium | 800 | 1st |
| Fatih Vatan Spor | Istanbul | Fatih Mimar Sinan Stadium | 800 | 9th |
| Fomget Gençlik ve Spor | Ankara | Batıkent Stadium | | 1st (Second League) |
| Hakkarigücü Spor | Hakkari | Merzan City Football Field | | 6th |
| Kdz. Ereğlispor | Karadeniz Ereğli | Beyçayir Football Field | | 5th |
| Kireçburnu Spor | Istanbul | Çayırbaşı Stadium | 5,000 | 8th |
| Kocaeli Bayan FK | İzmit | Mehmet Ali Kağıtçı Stadium | | 2nd (Second League) |
| Konak Belediyespor | İzmir | Atatürk Stadyum 1 no'lu Yan Saha | | 3rd |

== League table ==
| Pos | Team | Pld | W | D | L | GF | GA | GD | Pts | |
|---|---|---|---|---|---|---|---|---|---|---|
| 1 | ALG Spor | 15 | 14 | 1 | 0 | 53 | 6 | +47 | 43 | Champions League qualifying round |
| 2 | Beşiktaş J.K. | 15 | 14 | 0 | 1 | 64 | 12 | +52 | 42 | |
| 3 | Konak Belediyespor | 16 | 12 | 1 | 3 | 70 | 19 | +51 | 37 | |
| 4 | Ataşehir Belediyespor | 16 | 10 | 2 | 4 | 43 | 21 | +22 | 32 | |
| 5 | Fatih Vatan Spor | 15 | 9 | 1 | 5 | 30 | 30 | 0 | 28 | |
| 6 | Hakkarigücü Spor | 15 | 7 | 2 | 6 | 31 | 24 | +7 | 23 | |
| 7 | Kdz. Ereğlispor | 16 | 4 | 3 | 9 | 16 | 28 | −12 | 15 | |
| 8 | Kireçburnu Spor | 14 | 4 | 1 | 9 | 18 | 51 | −33 | 13 | |
| 9 | Kocaeli Bayan FK | 15 | 3 | 1 | 11 | 18 | 39 | −21 | 10 | |
| 10 | Amed Sportif Faaliyetler | 15 | 3 | 1 | 11 | 18 | 55 | −37 | 10 | |
| 11 | Adana İdmanyurduspor | 16 | 3 | 0 | 13 | 18 | 56 | −38 | 9 | |
| 12 | Fomget Gençlik ve Spor | 16 | 1 | 3 | 12 | 16 | 53 | −37 | 6 | |

Updated to match(es) played on 8 March 2020. Source: Kadınlar 1. Lig Puan Cetveli ve Fikstürü TFF
Rules for classification: 1) Points; 2) head-to-head points; 3) head-to-head goal difference 4) not to declared in default 5) Third match in neutral ground

== Results ==
| Home \ Away | AIY | ALG | AMD | ATA | BJK | FAT | FOM | HAK | KDZ | KIR | KOC | KON |
|---|---|---|---|---|---|---|---|---|---|---|---|---|
| Adana İdmanyurduspor | — | 26.04. | 03.05. | 1–8 | 2–3 | 1–3 | 22.03. | 1–5 | 0–3 | 0–3 | 05.04. | 2–3 |
| ALG Spor | 4–0 | — | 2–0 | 2–0 | 08.03. | 29.03. | 5–0 | 2–0 | 1–1 | 9–0 | 2–1 | 19.04. |
| Amed SF | 5–2 | 1–2 | — | 26.04. | 0–4 | 1–2 | 1–1 | 05.04. | 22.03. | 16.02. | 3–1 | 1–11 |
| Ataşehir BS | 19.04. | 05.04. | 5–1 | — | 0–2 | 4–2 | 4–1 | 22.03. | 3–1 | 03.05. | 4–0 | 0–0 |
| Beşiktaş J.K. | 6–1 | 0–2 | 8–0 | 4–1 | — | 22.03. | 4–0 | 26.04. | 05.04. | 10–2 | 4–0 | 3–2 |
| Fatih Vatan Spor | 6–1 | 0–8 | 2–0 | 0–0 | 1–5 | — | 26.04. | 2–1 | 3–0 | 08.03. | 3–2 | 05.04. |
| Fomget GS | 0–1 | 12–7 | 29.03. | 2–5 | 19.04. | 2–3 | — | 1–1 | 1–2 | 2–2 | 2–4 | 03.05. |
| Hakkarigücü Spor | 29.03. | 0–3 | 4–3 | 2–3 | 06.02. | 03.05. | 2–1 | — | 3–0 | 19.04. | 08.03. | 2–1 |
| Kdz. Ereğlispor | 1–2 | 03.05. | 0–1 | 0–1 | 0–1 | 19.04. | 1–0 | 1–1 | — | 29.03. | 3–1 | 0–6 |
| Kireçburnu Spor | 1–0 | 0–2 | 4–0 | 0–3 | 0–7 | 1–3 | 05.04. | 0–4 | 3–2 | — | 26.04. | 22.03. |
| Kocaeli Bayan FK | 1–3 | 22.03. | 19.04. | 29.03. | 03.05. | 1–0 | 0–1 | 4–0 | 1–1 | 3–1 | — | 2–4 |
| Konak BS | 5–1 | 1–2 | 8–1 | 3–2 | 29.03. | 3–0 | 11–0 | 2–1 | 26.04. | 6–1 | 4–1 | — |

Updated to match(es) played on 8 March 2020. Source: Kadınlar 1. Lig Puan Cetveli ve Fikstürü
Legend: Blue = home team win; Yellow = draw; Red = away team win.

== Top goalscorers ==
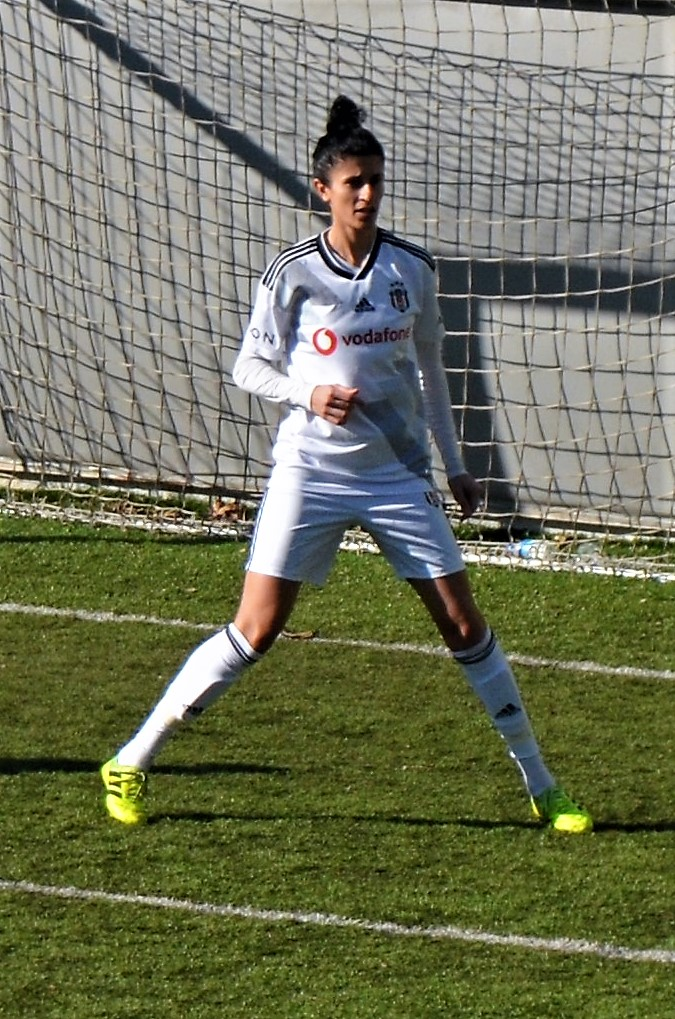
Yağmur Uraz of Beşiktaş J.K. in the 2019-20 Women's First League season.

As of 8 March 2020.

| Rank | Player | Team | GS | Pld | AG |
|---|---|---|---|---|---|
| 1 | (Turkey) Yağmur Uraz | Beşiktaş J.K. | 27 | 15 | 1.80 |
| 2 | (Tunisia) Mariem Houij | Ataşehir Belediyespor | 18 | 15 | 1.20 |
| 3 | (Turkey) Kader Hançar | Konak Belediyespor | 17 | 8 | 2.13 |
| 4 | (Turkey) Ebru Topçu | ALG Spor | 15 | 15 | 1.00 |
| 5 | (South Africa) Letago Madiba | ALG Spor | 11 | 14 | 0.79 |
| 5 | (Georgia (country)) Teona Bakradze | Hakkarigücü Spor | 11 | 15 | 0.73 |
| 5 | (Nigeria) Joy Bokiri | ALG Spor | 11 | 15 | 0.73 |
| 5 | (Turkey) Benan Altıntaş | Fomget GS | 11 | 16 | 0.69 |
| 9 | (Romania) Cosmina Dușa | Konak Belediyespor | 10 | 15 | 0.64 |
| 10 | (Ivory Coast) Cecile Esmei Amari | Ataşehir Belediyespor | 7 | 11 | 0.64 |
| 10 | (Turkey) Nursel Özkan | Hakkarigücü Spor | 7 | 12 | 0.58 |
| 10 | (Turkey) Nazlıcan Parlak | Kireçburnu Spor | 7 | 12 | 0.58 |
| 10 | (Turkey) Seda Nur İncik | Konak Belediyespor | 7 | 15 | 0.47 |
| 10 | (Turkey) Altun Sancar | Fatih Vatan Spor | 7 | 15 | 0.47 |
| 10 | (Turkey) Birgül Sadıkoğlu | Konak Belediyespor | 7 | 16 | 0.44 |

== Hat-tricks and more ==
| Player | Scored | For | Against | Result | Date |
|---|---|---|---|---|---|
| (Turkey) Nazlıcan Parlak | 3 | Kireçburnu Spor | Amed S.K. | 4-0 | 27 October 2019 |
| (Turkey) Yağmur Uraz | 3 | Beşiktaş J.K. | Adana İdmanyurduspor | 6-1 | 27 October 2019 |
| (Turkey) Yağmur Uraz | 4 | Beşiktaş J.K. | Kireçburnu Spor | 10-2 | 17 November 2019 |
| (Turkey) Arzu Karabulut | 3 | Beşiktaş J.K. | Kireçburnu Spor | 10-2 | 17 November 2019 |
| (Nigeria) Joy Ebinemiere Bokiri | 4 | Konak Belediyespor | Adana İdmanyurduspor | 5-1 | 17 November 2019 |
| (Turkey) Kader Hançar | 3 | Konak Belediyespor | Amed S.K. | 11-1 | 24 November 2019 |
| (North Macedonia) Eli Jakovska | 3 | Konak Belediyespor | Amed S.K. | 11-1 | 24 November 2019 |
| (Turkey) Kader Hançar | 6 | Konak Belediyespor | Kireçburnu Spor | 6-1 | 1 December 2019 |
| (Turkey) Nazlıcan Parlak | 3 | Kireçburnu Spor | Kdz. Ereğlispor | 3-2 | 8 December 2019 |
| (South Africa) Letago Madiba | 3 | ALG Spor | Fatih Vatan Spor | 8-0 | 8 December 2019 |
| (Tunisia) Mariem Houij | 3 | Ataşehir Belediyespor | Kocaeli Bayan FK | 4-0 | 8 December 2019 |
| (Georgia (country)) Teona Bakradze | 3 | Hakkarigücü Spor | Amed S.K. | 4-3 | 22 December 2019 |
| (Tunisia) Mariem Houij | 4 | Ataşehir Belediyespor | Adana İdmanyurduspor | 8-1 | 29 December 2019 |
| (Turkey) Kader Hançar | 3 | Konak Belediyespor | Kdz. Ereğlispor | 6-0 | 5 January 2020 |
| (Turkey) Yağmur Uraz | 3 | Beşiktaş J.K. | Kocaeli Bayan FK | 4-0 | 11 January 2020 |
| (Turkey) Kader Hançar | 4 | Konak Belediyespor | Fomget Gençlik ve Spor | 11-0 | 12 January 2020 |
| (Turkey) Yağmur Uraz | 4 | Beşiktaş J.K. | Ataşehir Belediyespor | 4-1 | 9 February 2020 |
| (Turkey) Yağmur Uraz | 5 | Beşiktaş J.K. | Amed S.K. | 8-0 | 23 February 2020 |
| (Turkey) Yağmur Uraz | 3 | Beşiktaş J.K. | Kireçburnu Spor | 7-0 | 1 March 2020 |
