= 2017–18 Turkish Women's First Football League =

Turkish Women's First Football League
- Season: 2017–18
- Dates: 12 November 2017 – 8 April. 2018
- Champions: Ataşehir Belediyespor; 3rd title
- Promoted: Amed S.K., Fatih Vatan Spor
- Relegated: 1207 Antalya Spor, İlkadım Belediyesi
- Champions League: Ataşehir Belediyespor
- Matches: 90
- Goals: 334 (3.71 per match)
- Top goalscorer: Kader Hançar
- Biggest home win: Konak Belediyespor; 11–1; Kireçburnu Spor (18 April 2018)
- Biggest away win: Kireçburnu Spor; 0–9; Ataşehir Belediyespor (14 March 2018)
- All statistics correct as of 3 November 2017.

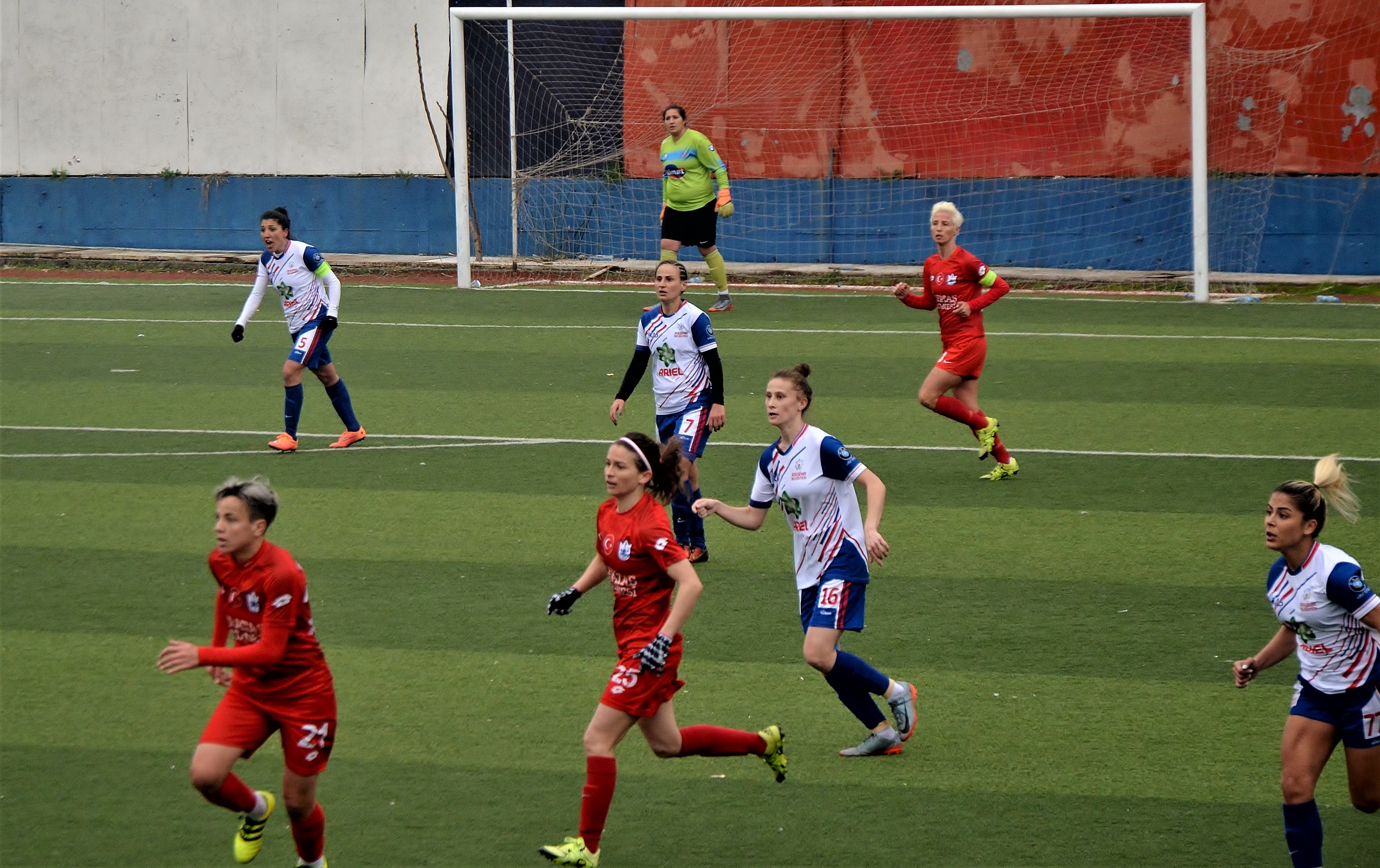
Ataşehir Belediyespor (white/blue) in the home match against Konak Belediyespor (red) at Yeni Sahra Stadium.

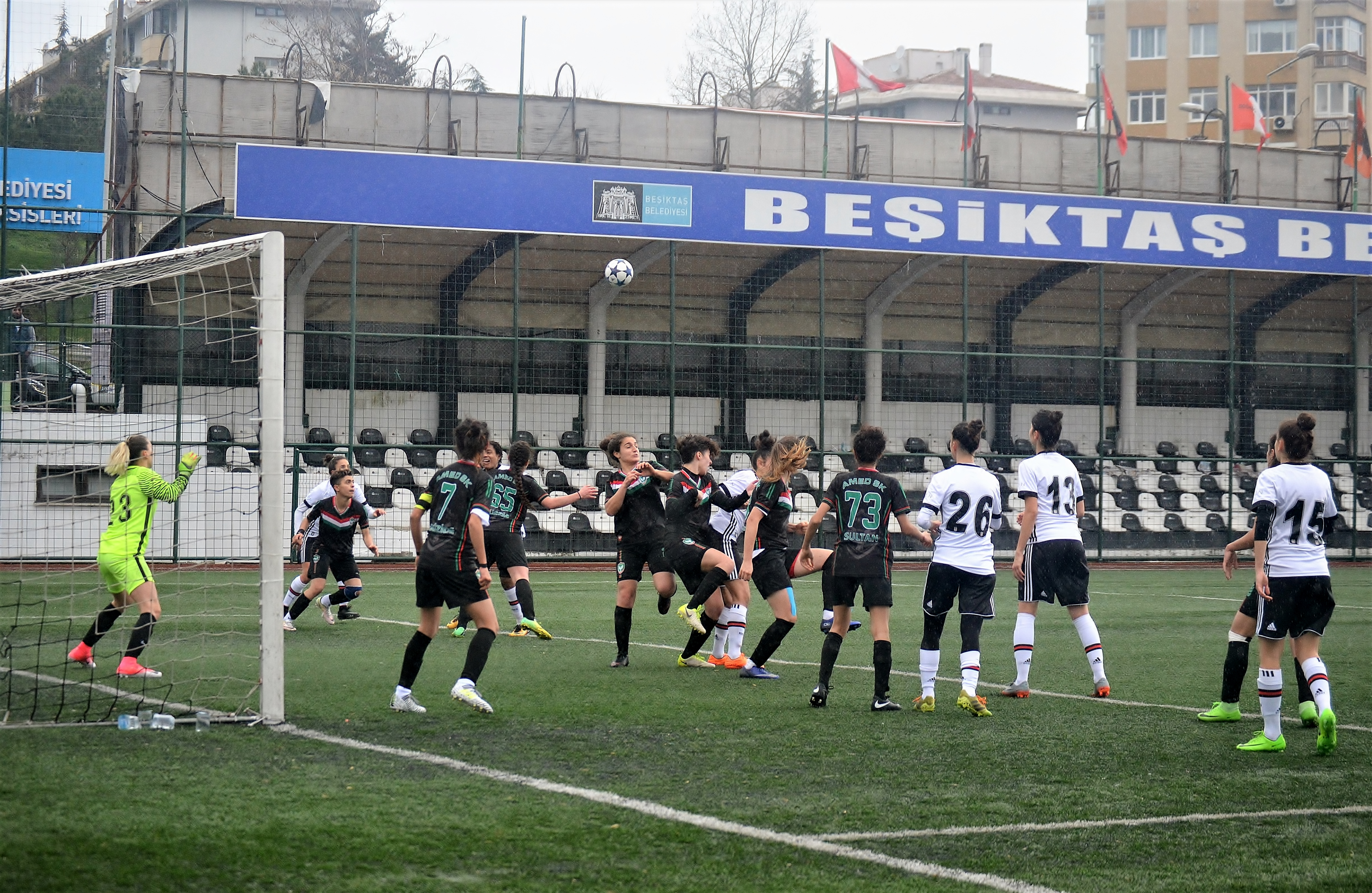
Beşiktaş J.K. (white/black) in the home match against Amed S.K. at Çilekli Stadium.

The 2017–18 season of the Turkish Women's First Football League is the 22nd season of Turkey's premier women's football league.

The league season started with the first week matches on 12 November 2017. The regular season concluded with the 18th week matches on 8 April. 2018. Ten teams competed with two promoted teams, Fatih Vatan Spor of Istanbul and Amed Sportif Faaliyetler from Diyarbakır, which replaced the relegated teams Adana İdmanyurduspor and Amasya Eğitim Spor. Four teams from Istanbul took part in the 2017–18 season.

Ataşehir Belediyespor became the league champion two matches before the league's end, regaining the title from Konak Belediyespor, who held the title five seasons in a row. This is the third title of the Istanbul-based team in their history. Ataşehir Belediyespor took part at the 2018–19 UEFA Women's Champions League qualifying round.

Konak Belediyespor and Beşiktaş J.K. finished the regular season of 2017–18 even on points behind the champion Ataşehir Belediyespor. The regular time of the play-off match between the two teams on April 22, 2018, ended with 1–1 draw. In the extension time, Beşiktaş J.K. scored three penalty goals, finished the match by 4–1, and became so runners-up.

== Teams ==
=== Team changes ===
Relegated from 2016–17 First League	Promoted from 2016–17 Second League
Adana İdmanyurduspor; Amasya Eğitim Spor	Amed Sportif Faaliyetler; Fatih Vatan Spor

Location of teams in the 2017–18 season of Turkish Women's First Football League

Season 2017–18
Team	Hometown	Ground	Capacity	2016–17 finish
1207 Antalyaspor	Antalya	Zeytinköy Football Field		5th
Amed Sportif Faaliyetler	Diyarbakır	Talaytepe Sports Facility		2nd (Second League)
Ataşehir Belediyespor	Istanbul	Yeni Sahra Stadium	700	3rd
Beşiktaş J.K.	Istanbul	Çilekli Football Field	800	2nd
Fatih Vatan Spor	Istanbul	Fatih Mimar Sinan Stadium	800	1st (Second League)
İlkadım Belediyesi	Samsun	Dereler Football Field		6th
Kdz. Ereğlispor	Karadeniz Ereğli	Beyçayir Football Field		7th
Kireçburnu Spor	Istanbul	Çayırbaşı Stadium	5,000	8th
Konak Belediyespor	İzmir	Atatürk Stadyum 1 no'lu Yan Saha		1st
Trabzon İdmanocağı	Trabzon	Yavuz Selim Stadium	1,820	4th

== League table ==
Pos	Team	Pld	W	D	L	GF	GA	GD	Pts	Qualification or relegation
1	Ataşehir Belediyespor	18	16	2	0	75	4	+71	50	Qualification
2	Beşiktaş J.K.	19	14	3	2	47	23	+24	45	
3	Konak Belediyespor	19	13	3	3	75	21	+54	42	
4	Kdz. Ereğlispor	18	10	1	7	26	22	+4	31	
5	Kireçburnu Spor	18	9	1	8	28	47	−19	28	
6	Fatih Vatan Spor	18	6	1	11	24	35	−11	19	
7	Amed Sportif Faaliyetler	18	5	1	12	21	40	−19	16	
8	Trabzon İdmanocağı	18	3	4	11	12	56	−44	13	
9	1207 Antalyaspor	18	3	1	14	13	37	−24	10	Relegation
10	İlkadım Belediyesi	18	2	3	13	13	49	−36	9	Relegation

Updated to match(es) played on 24 April 2018. Source: Kadinlar 1. Ligi 2017–18 Sezonu Fikstur ve Puan Cetveli TFF
Rules for classification: 1) Points; 2) head-to-head points; 3) head-to-head goal difference 4) not to declared in default 5) Third match in neutral ground

== Results ==
Home \ Away	ANT	AMD	ATA	BJK	FAT	ILK	KDZ	KIR	KON	TRA
1207 Antalyaspor	—	4–1	0–2	0–3	1–0	0–2	0–1	1–2	0–5	3–1
Amed SF	4–2	—	2–2	0–5	2–4	1–0	0–1	0–2	4–3	3–0
Ataşehir BS	1–0	5–0	—	5–1	3–0	9–0	5–0	6–0	4–1	7–0
Beşiktaş J.K.	1–0	2–0	0–4	—	4–2	6–2	1–1	3–2	1–1	4–0
Fatih Vatan Spor	3–0	1–0	0–2	1–3	—	2–2	1–3	1–2	1–3	0–2
İlkadım Bld.	2–0	0–2	0–3	1–3	0–1	—	0–1	1–5	0–4	2–2
Kdz. Ereğlispor	3–1	2–0	0–1	0–1	2–1	1–0	—	1–0	0–4	5–0
Kireçburnu Spor	2–0	3–1	0–9	1–2	1–2	1–0	1–3	—	1–6	1–0
Konak BS	4–1	3–1	0–0	2–2	4–0	6–0	2–1	11–1	—	10–0
Trabzon İO	0–0	1–0	0–7	0–1	1–4	1–1	3–2	1–1	0–5	—

Updated to match(es) played on 11 March 2018. Source: Kadınlar 1. Ligi 2017–18 Sezonu
Legend: Blue = home team win; Yellow = draw; Red = away team win.

1 – won by default 2 – default

=== Play-off for runners-up ===
Konak Belediyespor 1–4 Beşiktaş J.K.

== Top goalscorers ==
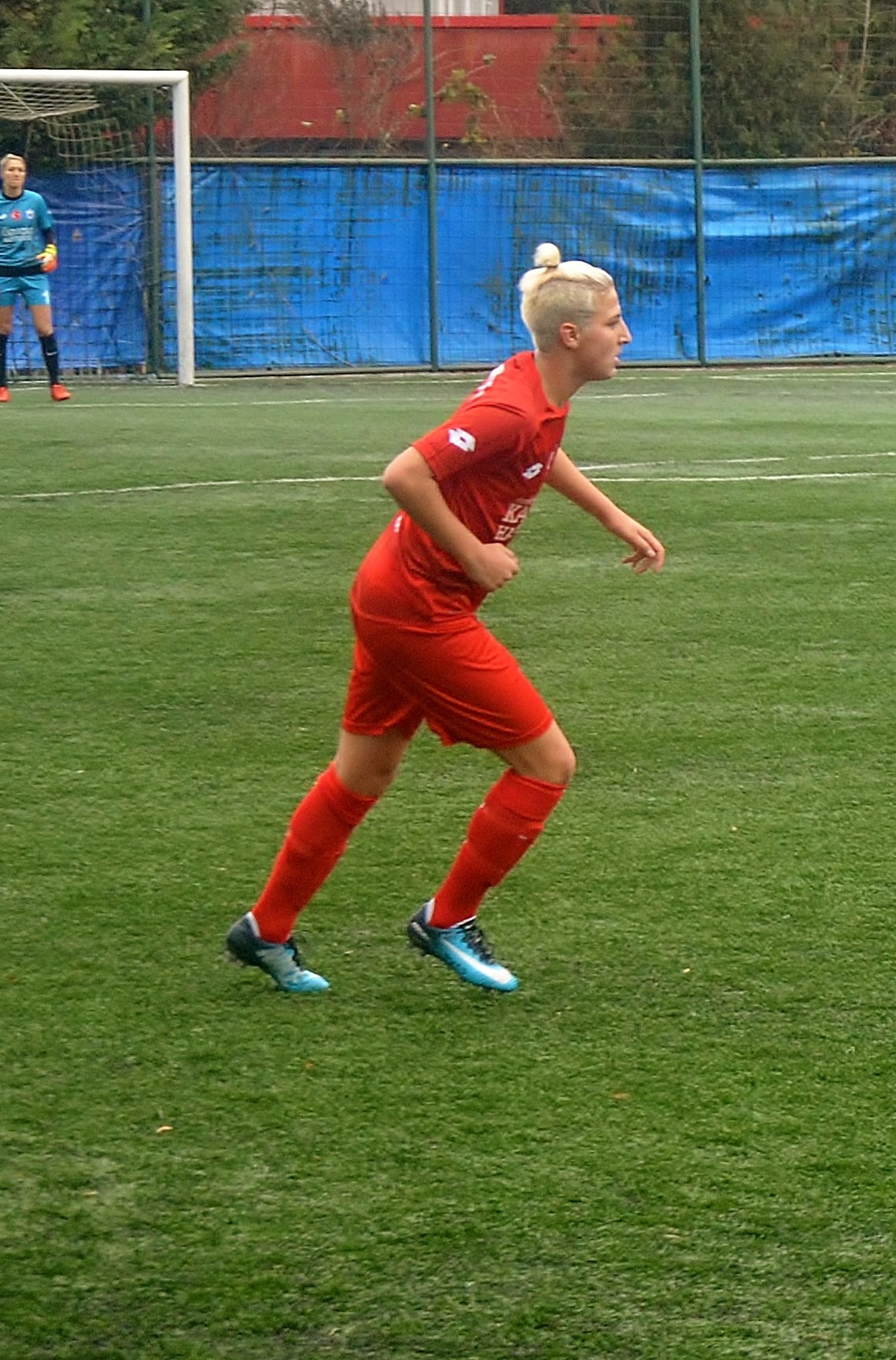
Kader Hançar of Konak Belediyespor in the 2017–18 season.

As of 22 April 2018.

Rank	Player	Team	GS	Pld	AG
1	(Turkey) Kader Hançar	Konak Belediyespor	30	19	1.58
2	(Turkey) Yağmur Uraz	Ataşehir Belediyespor	17	18	0.94
3	(Romania) Cosmina Duşa	Konak Belediyespor	16	17	0.94
4	(Ukraine) Tetyana Kozyrenko	Ataşehir Belediyespor	14	9	1.56
5	(Turkey) Güzide Alçu	Amed S.K.	10	16	0.63
6	(Turkey) Sevgi Çınar	Ataşehir Belediyespor	9	17	0.53
7	(Cameroon) Henriette Akaba	Ataşehir Belediyespor	8	11	0.73
7	(Turkey) Merve Aladağ	Kireçburnu Spor	8	17	0.47
7	(Cameroon) Jacquette Ada	Beşiktaş J.K.	8	17	0.47
7	(Turkey) Ebru Topçu	Ataşehir Belediyespor	8	18	0.44

== Hat-tricks ==
Player	For	Against	Result	Date
(Romania) Cosmina Dușa	Konak Belediyespor	Trabzon İdmanocağı	10-0	12 November 2017
(Turkey) Kader Hançar	Konak Belediyespor	Trabzon İdmanocağı	10-0	12 November 2017
(Turkey) Kader Hançar	Konak Belediyespor	İlkadım Belediyesi	6-0	7 January 2018
(Turkey) Kader Hançar	Konak Belediyespor	Trabzon İdmanocağı	5-0	11 February 2018
(Turkey) Kader Hançar	Konak Belediyespor	Kireçburnu Spor	11-1	18 April 2018
(Cameroon) Jacquette Ada	Beşiktaş J.K.	1207 Antalya Spor	3-0	30 December 2017
(Turkey) Merve Aladağ	Kireçburnu Spor	İlkadım Belediyesi	6-1	11 February 2018
(Ukraine) Tetyana Kozyrenko	Ataşehir Belediyespor	Kdz. Ereğli Belediye Spor	5-0	11 February 2018
(Ukraine) Tetyana Kozyrenko	Ataşehir Belediyespor	İlkadım Belediyesi	9-0	23 March 2018
(Ukraine) Tetyana Kozyrenko	Ataşehir Belediyespor	Beşiktaş J.K.	5-1	14 April 2018
(Turkey) Ebru Topçu	Ataşehir Belediyespor	Trabzon İdmanocağı	7-0	11 March 2018
