= List of Turkey women's national football team managers =

This is a list of the managers of the Turkey women's national football team, starting from the first international game in 1995 until date.

== Manager history ==
As of 9 June 2026

| Manager | Nat | Career Start | Career End | Played | Won | Drawn | Lost | GF | GA | Win % | Ref |
|---|---|---|---|---|---|---|---|---|---|---|---|
| Unknown | — | 1995 | 2002 | 43 | 11 | 3 | 29 | 54 | 133 | 25.58 | |
| Atılay Canel | Turkey | 2002 | 2002 | 2 | 0 | 0 | 2 | 3 | 7 | 0.00 | |
| Hamdi Aslan | Turkey | 2006 | 2010 | 21 | 12 | 3 | 6 | 56 | 33 | 57.14 | |
| Yücel Uyar | Turkey | 2011 | 2011 | 8 | 1 | 2 | 5 | 8 | 25 | 12.50 | |
| Nur Mustafa Gülen | Turkey | 2011 | 2012 | 4 | 0 | 0 | 4 | 1 | 16 | 0.00 | |
| Ogün Temizkanoğlu | Turkey | 2012 | 2012 | 2 | 0 | 0 | 2 | 1 | 13 | 0.00 | |
| Nur Mustafa Gülen | Turkey | 2013 | 2014 | 8 | 3 | 0 | 5 | 9 | 23 | 37.50 | |
| Suat Okyar | Turkey | 2014 | 2014 | 2 | 1 | 0 | 1 | 3 | 8 | 50.00 | |
| Talat Tuncel | Turkey | 2015 | 2019 | 33 | 12 | 5 | 16 | 51 | 65 | 36.36 | |
| Necla Güngör Kıragası | Turkey | 2020 | Incumbent | 60 | 32 | 8 | 20 | 101 | 70 | 53.33 | |
