= Serra Çağan =

Turkish footballer (born 1997)

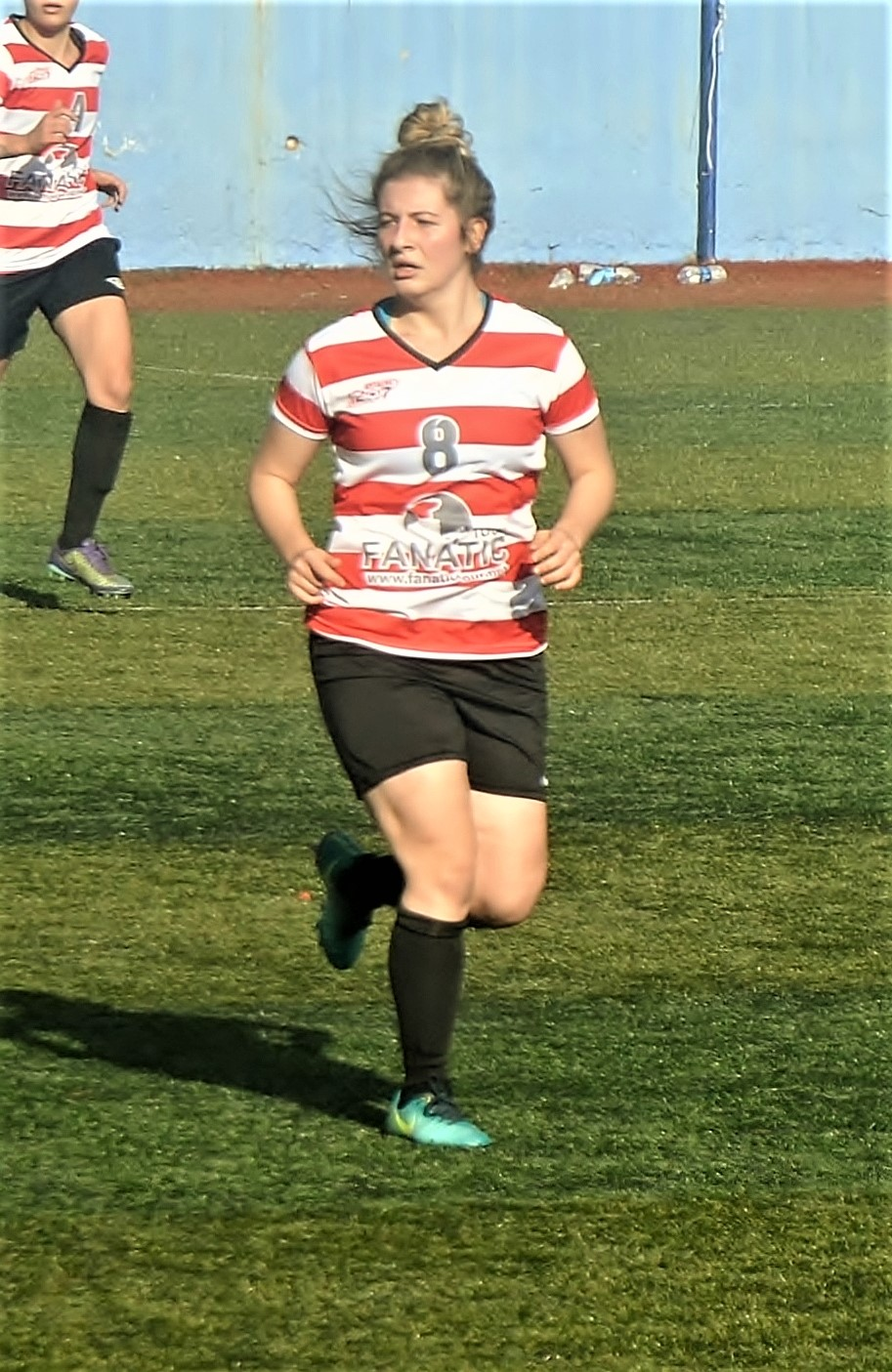
- Serra Çağan for 1207 Antalyaspor (December 2017)

Personal information
- Date of birth: February 17, 1997 (age 29)
- Place of birth: İzmit, Turkey
- Position: Defender

Team information
- Current team: 1207 Antalya Spor
- Number: 8

Senior career*
| Years | Team | Apps | (Gls) |
| 2008–2009 | İzmit Saraybahçe Belediye S | 8 | (0) |
| 2009–2012 | İzmit Belediyespor | 50 | (21) |
| 2012–2013 | İzmit Çenesuyu Plajyoluspor | 14 | (14) |
| 2013–2015 | Karşıyaka Koleji Spor | 33 | (19) |
| 2015–2018 | 1207 Antalyaspor | 49 | (6) |
| 2018–2019 | Kdz. Ereğli Belediye Spor | 7 | (0) |
| 2020– | 1207 Antalya Spor | 3 | (0) |

International career^{‡}
| 2010 | Turkey U-15 | 2 | (0) |
| 2012–2014 | Turkey U-17 | 17 | (0) |
| 2013–2015 | Turkey U-19 | 27 | (3) |
| 2014 | Turkey U-21 | 1 | (0) |
| 2015–2017 | Turkey | 7 | (0) |
- * Club domestic league appearances and goals as of 25 December 2021 ‡ National team caps and goals as of 8 April 2017

Serra Çağan (born February 17, 1997) is a Turkish women's football defender, who plays in the Turkish Women's Football Super League for 1207 Anyalya Spor with jersey number 8. She is a member of the Turkey women's national team.

== Career ==
=== Club ===
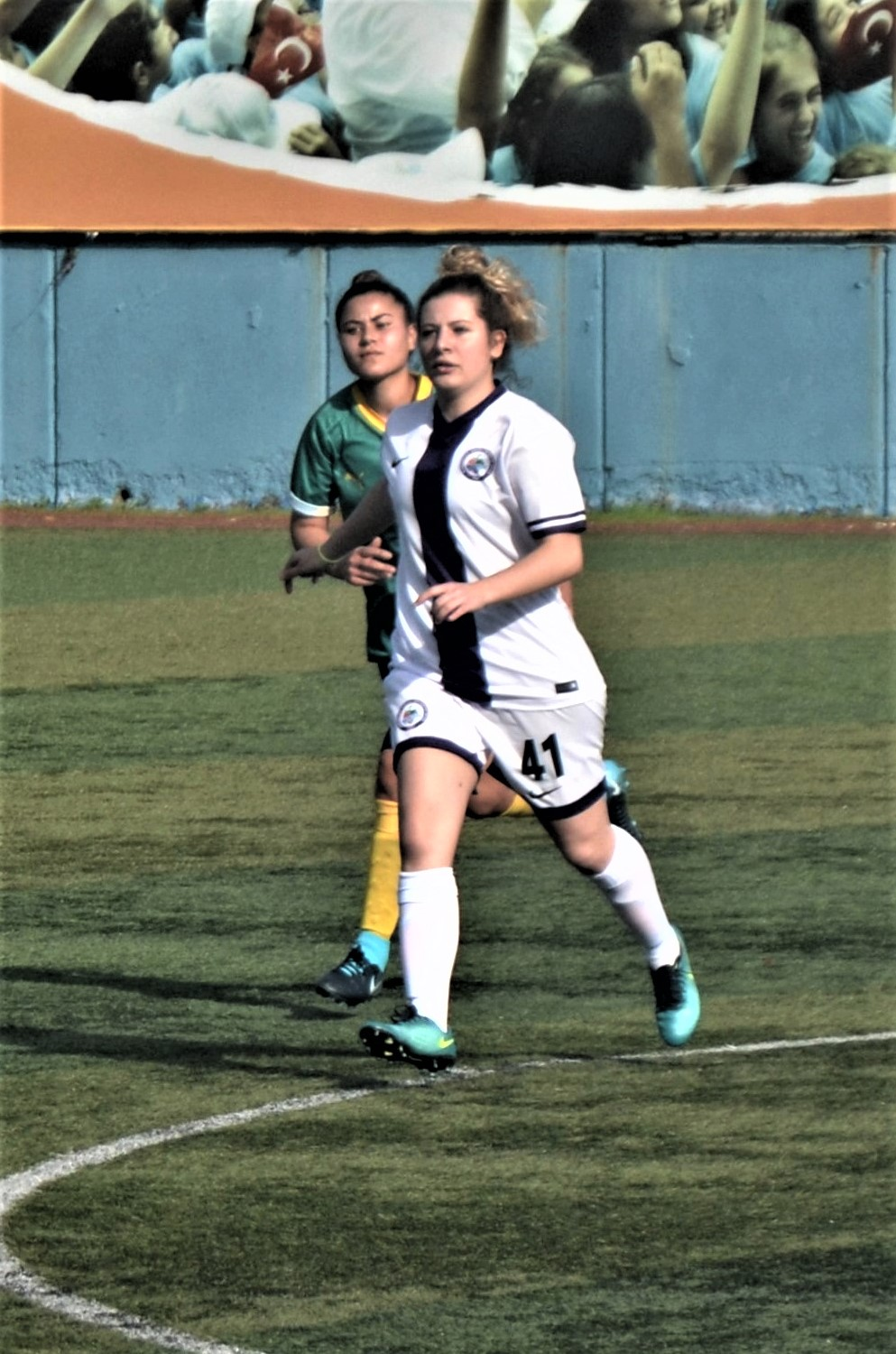
Serra Çağan of Kdz. Ereğlispor in the 2018–19 Women's First League season.

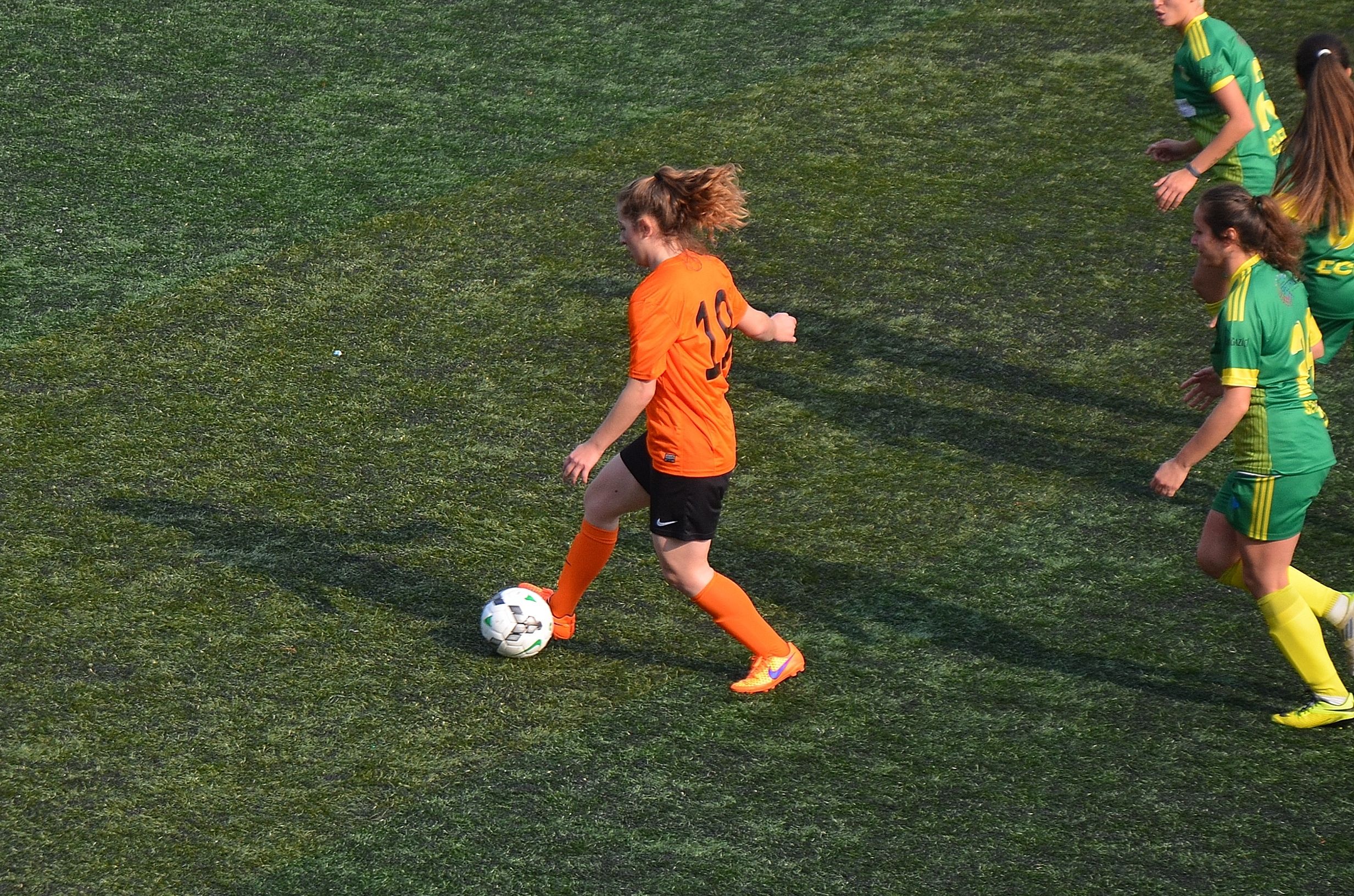
Serra Çağan driving the ball for 1207 Antalya Muratpaşa Belediye Spor in the 2015–16 season's away match against Kireçburnu Spor.

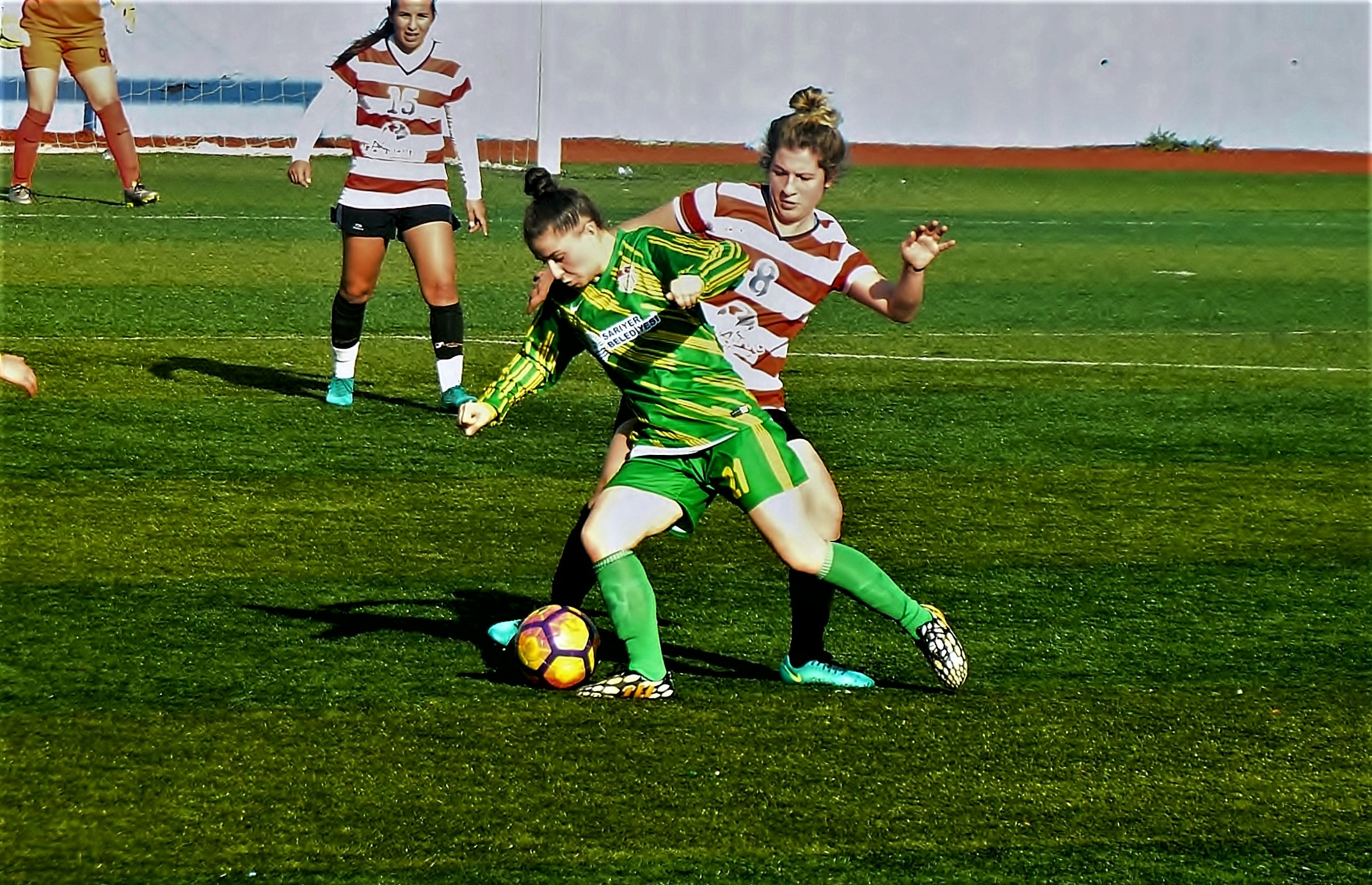
Serra Çağan (white/orange) of 1207 Antakya Döşemealtı Belediye Spor challenging Nagihan Avanaş (green/yellow) of Kireçburnu Spor in the 2017–18 First League.

Serra Çağan obtained her license on June 10, 2008, for her hometown club İzmit Saraybahçe Belediyespor. After appearing in eight matches in one season of the Turkish Women's Second League, she transferred to İzmit Belediyespor, which was in the Regional League. At the end of the 2009–10 season, her team was promoted to the Second League, and the next season to the First League. She capped in 50 matches scoring 21 goals in three seasons. In the 2012–13 season, she was with İzmit Çenesuyu Plajyoluspor in the Second League again, where she netted 14 goals in 14 matches. For the next season, she signed with Karşıyaka Koleji Spor, another İzmit-based club. Çağan played in 33 games and scored 19 goals in two seasons between 2013 and 2015.

The newly to the First League promoted club 1207 Antalya Muratpaşa Belediye Spor transferred her for the 2015–16 season.

In October 2018, she transferred to Kdz. Ereğlispor.

She transferred again to 1207 Antalya Spor in the 2020–21 Turkcell Women's Football League season.

=== International ===
Çağan was admitted to the Turkey girls' U-15 team and debuted in the friendly match against Russia on November 23, 2010. She capped twice for the youth nationals.

On April 19, 2012, she appeared for the first time for the Turkey girls' U-17 team in the UEFA Development Tournament against Azerbaijan. She took part at the UEFA Women's Under-17 Championship qualification matches of 2013 and 2014. She capped 17 times in total.

Çağan was called up to the Turkey women's U-19 team debuting in the friendly match against Azerbaijan on November 26, 2013. She participated at the UEFA Women's Under-19 Championship qualification matches of 2014 Elite round, 2015, 2015 Elite round, and 2016. She netted three goals in 27 appearances so far. Currently, she serves as the captain.

On November 26, 2014, Çağan appeared in the women's national U-21 team in the match against Belgium.

Çağan was called up to the Turkey women's national team to play at the UEFA Women's Euro 2017 qualifying Group 5 matches.

She took part in three matches of the Goldcity Women's Cup 2017 held in Antalya, Turkey. She played against Montenegro and Luxembourg in two matches of the 2019 FIFA Women's World Cup qualification – UEFA preliminary round – Group 4.

== Career statistics ==
As of 25 December 2021

| Club | Season | League | | | Continental | | National | | Total | |
| Club | Season | Division | Apps | Goals | Apps | Goals | Apps | Goals | Apps | Goals |
|---|---|---|---|---|---|---|---|---|---|---|
| İzmit Saraybahçe Belediyespor | 2008–09 | Second | 8 | 0 | – | – | 0 | 0 | 8 | 0 |
| İzmit Saraybahçe Belediyespor | Total | | 8 | 0 | – | – | 0 | 0 | 8 | 0 |
| İzmit Belediyespor | 2009–10 | Regional | 10 | 0 | – | – | 0 | 0 | 10 | 0 |
| İzmit Belediyespor | 2010–11 | Second | 21 | 11 | – | – | 2 | 0 | 23 | 11 |
| İzmit Belediyespor | 2011–12 | First | 19 | 10 | – | – | 2 | 0 | 21 | 10 |
| İzmit Belediyespor | Total | | 50 | 21 | – | – | 4 | 0 | 54 | 21 |
| İzmit Çenesuyu Plajyoluspor | 2012–13 | Second | 14 | 14 | – | – | 9 | 0 | 23 | 14 |
| İzmit Çenesuyu Plajyoluspor | Total | | 14 | 14 | – | – | 9 | 0 | 23 | 14 |
| Karşıyaka Koleji Spor | 2013–14 | Second | 11 | 12 | – | – | 15 | 2 | 26 | 14 |
| Karşıyaka Koleji Spor | 2014–15 | Second | 22 | 7 | – | – | 14 | 0 | 36 | 7 |
| Karşıyaka Koleji Spor | Total | | 33 | 19 | – | – | 29 | 2 | 62 | 21 |
| 1207 Antalyaspor | 2015–16 | First | 12 | 4 | – | – | 7 | 1 | 19 | 5 |
| 1207 Antalyaspor | 2016–17 | First | 20 | 1 | – | – | 5 | 0 | 25 | 1 |
| 1207 Antalyaspor | 2017–18 | First | 17 | 1 | – | – | 0 | 0 | 17 | 1 |
| 1207 Antalyaspor | Total | | 49 | 6 | – | – | 12 | 1 | 61 | 7 |
| Kdz. Ereğli Belediye Spor | 2018–19 | First | 7 | 0 | – | – | 0 | 0 | 7 | 0 |
| Kdz. Ereğli Belediye Spor | Total | | 7 | 0 | – | – | 0 | 0 | 7 | 0 |
| 1207 Antalya Spor | 2020–21 | First League | 1 | 0 | – | – | 0 | 0 | 1 | 0 |
| 1207 Antalya Spor | 2021–22 | Super League | 2 | 0 | – | – | 0 | 0 | 2 | 0 |
| 1207 Antalya Spor | Total | | 3 | 0 | – | – | 0 | 0 | 3 | 0 |
| Career total | | | 164 | 60 | – | – | 54 | 3 | 218 | 63 |
