= Elif Deniz =

Turkish women's footballer

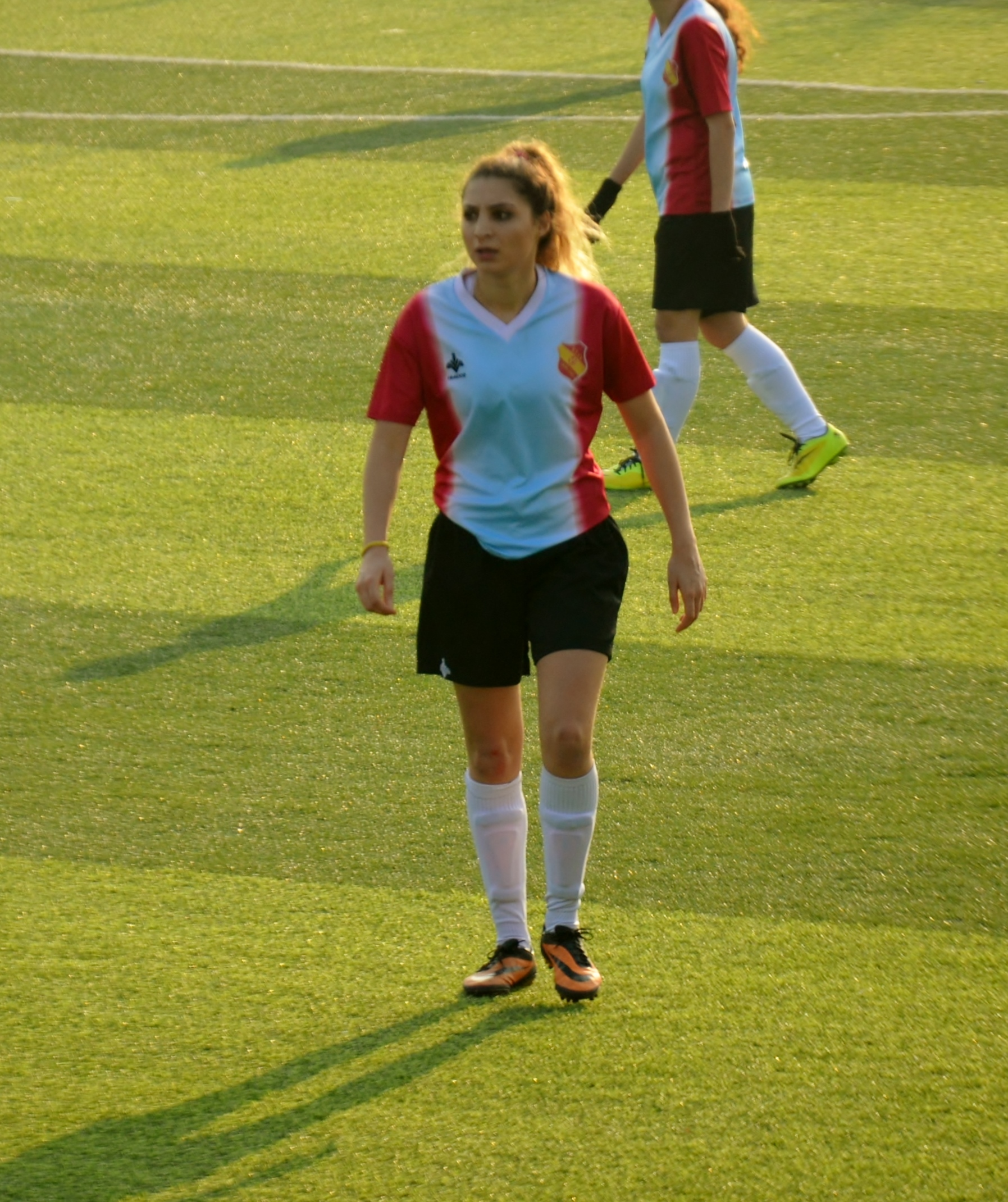
- Elif Deniz for Trabzon İdmanocağı (December 2014)

Personal information
- Date of birth: 25 March 1993 (age 33)
- Place of birth: Karadeniz Ereğli, Zonguldak, Turkey
- Position: Midfielder

Team information
- Current team: Trabzon İdmanocağı
- Number: 11

Senior career*
Years	Team	Apps	(Gls)
2006–2012	Kdz. Ereğlispor	61	(27)
2012–present	Trabzon İdmanocağı	51	(7)
Total		112	(34)

International career^{‡}
2008–2009	Turkey U-17	11	(0)
2011	Turkey U-19	23	(1)
2014	Turkey U-21	1	(0)
2011–2015	Turkey	8	(0)
- * Club domestic league appearances and goals as of 3 January 2016 ‡ National team caps and goals as of 26 February 2015

Elif Deniz (born 25 March 1993) is a Turkish women's football midfielder who last played in the First League for Trabzon İdmanocağı with jersey number 11. She is a member of the Turkish national team since 2010.

== Career ==
=== Club ===
She received her license on 5 May 2006 for her hometown club Kdz. Ereğlispor, where she played until October 2012. In the 2012–13 season, Elif Deniz transferred to Trabzon İdmanocağı.

=== International ===
Elif Deniz was called for the Turkey girls' U-17 national team, and debuted in the 2009 UEFA Women's U-17 Championship qualifying round match against the Irish girls on 18 October 2008. She participated also at the 2010 UEFA Women's U-17 Championship qualifying round matches, and capped 11 times in total for the youth nationals.

She appeared for the first time in the Turkey women's U-19 team in the match against Icelandic juniors at the 2011 UEFA Women's U-19 Championship Second qualifying round on 31 March 2011. Elif Deniz participated also at the 2012 UEFA Women's U-19 Championship – Final tournament matches. She capped 23 times in total and scored one goal for the junior women's team.

She made her first appearance in the women's national team on 3 February 2010 playing in a friendly match against the Russian team. She participated in the qualifying round matches of UEFA Women's Euro 2013 qualifying – Group 2 and 2015 FIFA Women's World Cup qualification – UEFA Group 6. As of 19 June 2014 she capped 7 times in the national team.

== Career statistics ==
As of 3 January 2016.

Club	Season	League			Continental		National		Total	
Club	Season	Division	Apps	Goals	Apps	Goals	Apps	Goals	Apps	Goals
Kdz. Ereğlispor	2008–09	Second League	8	3	–	–	5	0	13	3
Kdz. Ereğlispor	2009–10	Second League	18	11	–	–	9	0	27	11
Kdz. Ereğlispor	2010–11	Second League	14	6	–	–	8	0	22	6
Kdz. Ereğlispor	2011–12	First League	21	7	–	–	12	1	33	8
Kdz. Ereğlispor	Total		61	27	–	–	34	1	95	28
Trabzon İdmanocağı	2012–13		17	4	–	–	3	0	20	4
Trabzon İdmanocağı	2013–14	First League	11	0	–	–	4	0	15	0
Trabzon İdmanocağı	2014–15	First League	14	2	–	–	2	0	16	2
Trabzon İdmanocağı	2015–16	First League	9	1	–	–	0	0	9	1
Trabzon İdmanocağı	Total		51	7	–	–	9	0	60	7
Career total			112	34	–	–	43	1	155	35

== Honours ==
Turkish Women's First League

Kdz. Ereğlispor
Third places (1): 2011–12

Trabzon İdmanocağı
Third places (1): 2014–15, 2015–16
