= Okyar =

Okyar is a Turkish surname. Notable people with the surname include:

- Fethi Okyar (1880–1943), Turkish diplomat and politician
- Suat Okyar (born 1972), Turkish footballer and manager
- Vedat Okyar (1945–2009), Turkish footballer and sports journalist
