= Esra Sibel Tezkan =

Turkish-German footballer (born 1993)

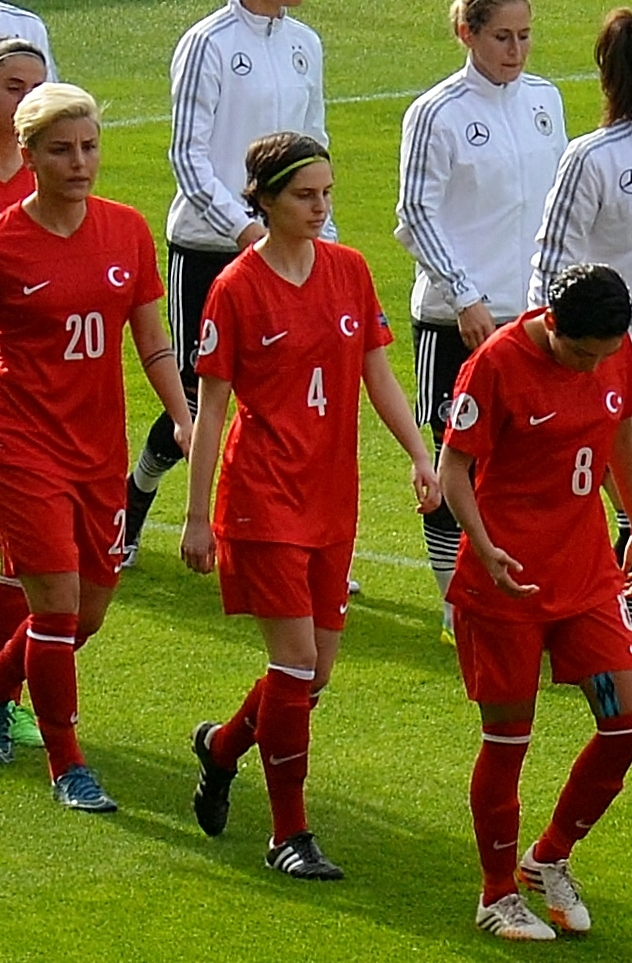
- Esra Sibel Tezkan playing for Turkey women's national (April 2016)

Personal information
- Date of birth: February 23, 1993 (age 33)
- Place of birth: Bremerhaven, Germany
- Position: Defender

Team information
- Current team: Bergisch Gladbach 09

Youth career
- 2004–2008: Fortuna Köln

Senior career*
Years	Team	Apps	(Gls)
2008–2013	Bayer 04 Leverkusen		
2013–	Bergisch Gladbach 09		

International career^{‡}
2010	Turkey U-17	4	(0)
2010–2012	Turkey U-19	13	(0)
2014	Turkey U-21	1	(0)
2015–2017	Turkey	8	(0)
- * Club domestic league appearances and goals as of 3 May, 2015 ‡ National team caps and goals as of 17 November, 2026

Esra Sibel Tezkan (born 23 February, 1993) is a Turkish-German professional footballer currently playing in the German Women's Regional League of the Middle Rhine for 1. FFC Bergisch Gladbach 2009. She is part of the Turkey women's national football team.

== Family life ==
Esra Sibel Tezkan was born to a Turkish father and a German mother in Bremerhaven, Germany, on 23 February, 1993. She was supported in playing football by her father, a professor of geophysics at the University of Cologne, who is an amateur footballer as well. She has two older brothers, one a footballer and the other performing athletics.

== Playing career ==
Her father always took her to football matches when he was playing so she became interested in football at an early age. She began playing football with boys because no girls were available to play with. At age five, her father registered her with a club where she had to play again with boys. At eleven, she was transferred to the women's side of SC Fortuna Köln in her home town. She finds that her time playing with boys has contributed positively to her strength.

== Club ==
After four years with SC Fortuna Köln, Tezkan moved at age fifteen to Bayer 04 Leverkusen.

In the 2013–14 season, she signed for 1. FFC Bergisch Gladbach 2009, where she currently plays in the Frauen-Mittelrheinliga (Women's League of the Middle Rhine).

== International ==
Tezkan was discovered for the Turkey women's national team by Bilgin Defterli, a Turkish women's footballer, who moved from Turkey to Germany for her professional football career.

Tezkan was admitted to the Turkey girls' U-17 team debuting in the International Women's Football Friendship Tournament against Bulgaria on 27 June, 2010. She was capped four times for the Turkey girls' U-17 team.

On 11 September, 2010, she appeared for the first time in the Turkey women's U-19 team playing at the 2011 UEFA Women's U-19 Championship First qualifying round – Group 9 match against Romania. She took part at the 2011 UEFA Women's U-19 Championship Second qualifying round – Group 3 in the 2011 Kuban Spring Tournament and 2012 UEFA Women's Under-19 Championship – Group A matches. She was capped in 13 games with the Turkey women's U-19 team.

Tezkan played once for the Turkey women's U-21 team in a friendly match against Belgium on 26 November, 2014.

On 26 February, 2015, she took part in the friendly game of the Turkey women's team against Georgia. She played at the UEFA Women's Euro 2017 qualifying Group 5 matches for Turkey.
