= Turkey women's national under-21 football team =

Turkey U21 Türkiye U21
- Association: Turkish Football Federation
- Confederation: UEFA (Europe)
- Head coach: (Turkey) Talat Tuncel
- FIFA code: TUR
First colours	Second colours

First international
- Belgium 0–2 Turkey (Blegny, Belgium; November 26, 2014)

Biggest win
- Belgium 0–2 Turkey (Blegny, Belgium; November 26, 2014)

Biggest defeat
- None

The Turkey women's national under-21 football team (Turkish: Türkiye 21 Yaş Altı Kadın Millî Futbol Takımı) is the national under-21 football team of Turkey and is governed by the Turkish Football Federation.

== Results ==
=== 2014 ===
26 November 2014 Friendly	Belgium	0–2	Turkey	Blegny, Belgium
16:00		Report	Topçu 45'; Başkol 77'	Referee: Virginie Derouaux (Belgium)

== All-time records ==
As of 26 November 2014 The following table shows Turkey women's U-21 all-time international record:

Period	Pl	W	D	L	GF	GA
2014	1	1	0	0	2	0

== Current squad ==
As of 26 November 2014

Head coach: (Turkey) Talat Tuncel
Coach: (Turkey) Necla Güngör
Goalkeeping coach: (Turkey) Atilla Küçüktaka

No.	Pos.	Player	Date of birth (age)	Caps	Goals	Club
1	GK	Selda Akgöz	June 9, 1993 (age 33)	1	0	(Turkish Football Federation) Trabzon İdmanocağı
12	GK	Meryem Koç	November 28, 1996 (age 29)	0	0	(Turkish Football Federation) Adana İdmanyurduspor
2	DF	Berna Yeniçeri	January 26, 1996 (age 30)	1	0	(Turkish Football Federation) Konak Belediyespor
3	DF	Didem Karagenç	October 16, 1993 (age 33)	1	0	(Turkish Football Federation) Konak Belediyespor
4	DF	Emine Demir	November 11, 1993 (age 32)	1	0	(Turkish Football Federation) Trabzon İdmanocağı
5	DF	Esra Sibel Tezkan	February 23, 1993 (age 33)	1	0	(German Football Association) 1. FFC Bergisch Gladbach 2009
8	DF	Yaşam Göksu	September 25, 1995 (age 31)	1	0	(Turkish Football Federation) Konak Belediyespor
14	DF	Kübra Berber	April 1, 1996 (age 30)	1	0	(Turkish Football Federation) 1207 Antalya Muratpaşa Belediye Spor
6	MF	Esra Güler	November 22, 1994 (age 31)	1	0	(Turkish Football Federation) 1207 Antalya Muratpaşa Belediye Spor
7	MF	Selin Sivrikaya	January 1, 1997 (age 29)	1	0	(Turkish Football Federation) Karşıyaka BESEM Spor
9	MF	Hilal Başkol	January 10, 1995 (age 31)	1	1	(Turkish Football Federation) Konak Belediyespor
10	MF	Emine Ecem Esen	May 3, 1994 (age 32)	1	0	(Turkish Football Federation) Ataşehir Belediyespor
11	MF	Elif Deniz	March 25, 1993 (age 33)	1	0	(Turkish Football Federation) Trabzon İdmanocağı
13	MF	Serra Çağan	February 17, 1997 (age 29)	1	0	(Turkish Football Federation) Karşıyak Koleji Spor
15	MF	Gizem Gönültaş	July 13, 1993 (age 33)	1	0	(Turkish Football Federation) Adana İdmanyurduspor
17	MF	Semanur Akbaş	January 1, 1996 (age 30)	0	0	(Turkish Football Federation) 1207 Antalya Muratpaşa Belediye Spor
18	MF	Gülbin Hız	June 11, 1994 (age 32)	1	0	(Turkish Football Federation) Konak Belediyespor
16	FW	Ebru Topçu	August 27, 1996 (age 30)	1	1	(Turkish Football Federation) Konak Belediyespor

== See also ==
- Women's football in Turkey
- Turkey women's national football team
- Turkey women's national under-19 football team
- Turkey women's national under-17 football team
