= Esra Güler =

Turkish footballer (born 1994)

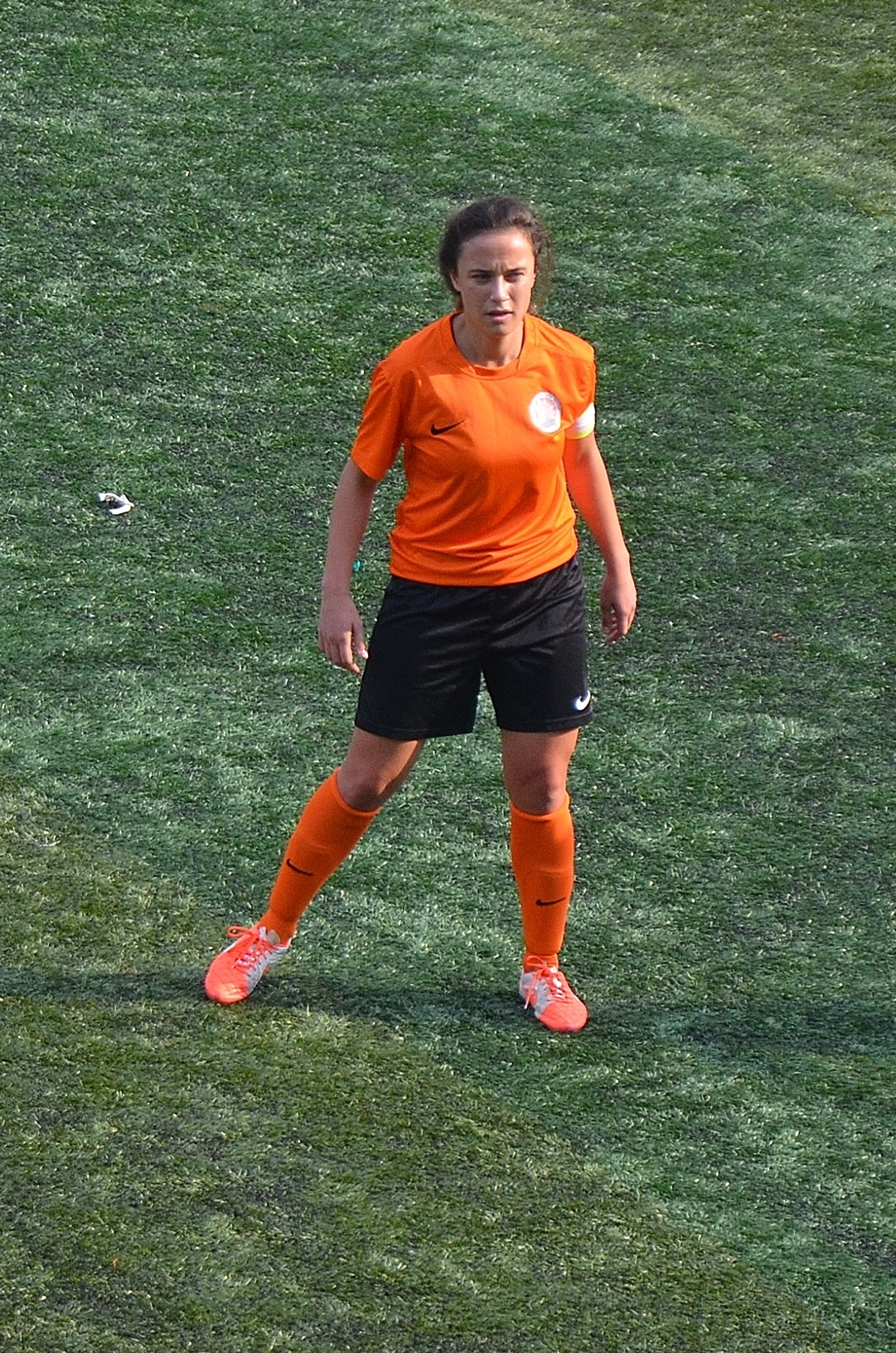
- Esra Güler for 1207 Antalyaspor in the 2015–16 season

Personal information
- Date of birth: November 22, 1994 (age 31)
- Place of birth: Antalya, Turkey
- Position: Midfielder

Team information
- Current team: Kılıçaslan Yıldızspor
- Number: 9

Senior career*
Years	Team	Apps	(Gls)
2008–2016	1207 Antalyaspor	121	(51)
2017–	Kılıçaslan Yıldızspor	2	(1)
Total		123	(52)

International career^{‡}
2014	Turkey U-21	1	(0)
- * Club domestic league appearances and goals as of June 14, 2017 ‡ National team caps and goals as of April 11, 2015

Esra Güler (born November 22, 1994) is a Turkish women's football midfielder currently playing in the Women's TjirdFirst League for Kılıçaslan Yıldızspor with jersey number 9. She played once for the Turkey women's U-21 team.

== Early life ==
Esra Güler was born in Antalya, Turkey on November 22, 1994. She finished Muratpaşa High School in 2011. Her father, who was a footballer playing in various teams, supported her for playing football already in her childhood, even with the boys in the neighborhood.

== Career ==
=== Club ===
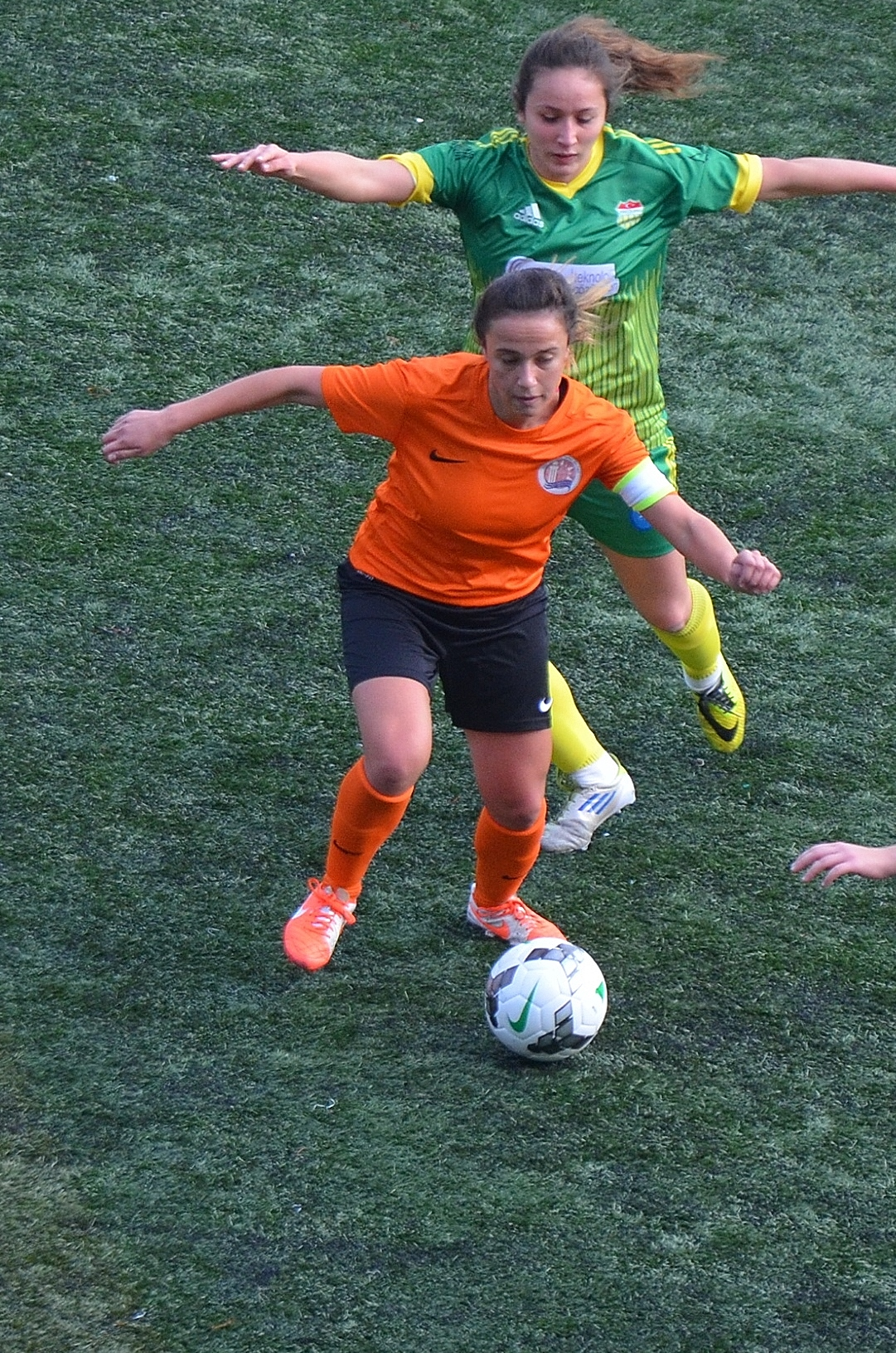
Esra Güler playing for 1207 Antalya Muratpaşa Belediye Spor in the 2015–16 season's away match against Kireçburnu Spor.

She obtained her license on February 23, 2007, for her hometown club Yeni Kapı Gençler Birliği, which played in the Turkish Women's League and was later renamed Antalyaspor. She began to participate in the league matches from the 2008–09 season on. In the 2011–12 season, the club played under the name Medical Park Antalyaspor in line with its sponsor. At the end of the 2011–12 season, the team were relegated to the Second Leaguer, and abandoned by Antalyaspor. Between 2012 and 2014, she played in the same team, which was re-founded as 1207 Antaltyaspor. With her team's Second League championship title won in the 2014–15 season, Güler enjoyed the promotion to the Women's First League again. She acted as the captain of her team.

In the 2016–17 season, Güler transferred to the Third League-team Kıçaslan Yıldızspor.

=== International ===
On November 26, 2014, Güler debuted in the Turkey women's national under-21 football team playing in the friendly match against Belgium.

== Career statistics ==
As of match played June 14, 2017.

Club	Season	League			Continental		National		Total	
Club	Season	Division	Apps	Goals	Apps	Goals	Apps	Goals	Apps	Goals
1207 Antalyaspor	2008–09	Second League	7	0	–	–	0	0	7	0
1207 Antalyaspor	2009–10	First League	16	2	–	–	0	0	16	2
1207 Antalyaspor	2010–11	First League	22	4	–	–	0	0	22	4
1207 Antalyaspor	2011–12	First League	20	4	–	–	7	0	20	4
1207 Antalyaspor	2012–13	Second League	9	5	–	–	0	0	9	5
1207 Antalyaspor	2013–14	Second League	12	14	–	–	0	0	12	14
1207 Antalyaspor	2014–15	Second League	21	17	–	–	1	0	22	17
1207 Antalyaspor	2015–16	First League	14	5	–	–			14	5
1207 Antalyaspor	Total		121	51	–	–	1	0	122	51
Kılıçaslan Yıldızspor	2016–17	Third League	2	1	–	–	0	0	2	1
Kılıçaslan Yıldızspor	Total		2	1	–	–	0	0	2	1
Career total			123	52	–	–	1	0	124	52

== Honours ==
=== Club ===
Turkish Women's Second League

1207 Antalyaspor
Winners (1): 2014–15

=== Individual ===
Turkish Women^s Third League
Topscorer (17 goals) 2018–19 season with Yeni Kemer Belediyespor
