= Talat Tuncel =

Turkish football manager (born 1964)

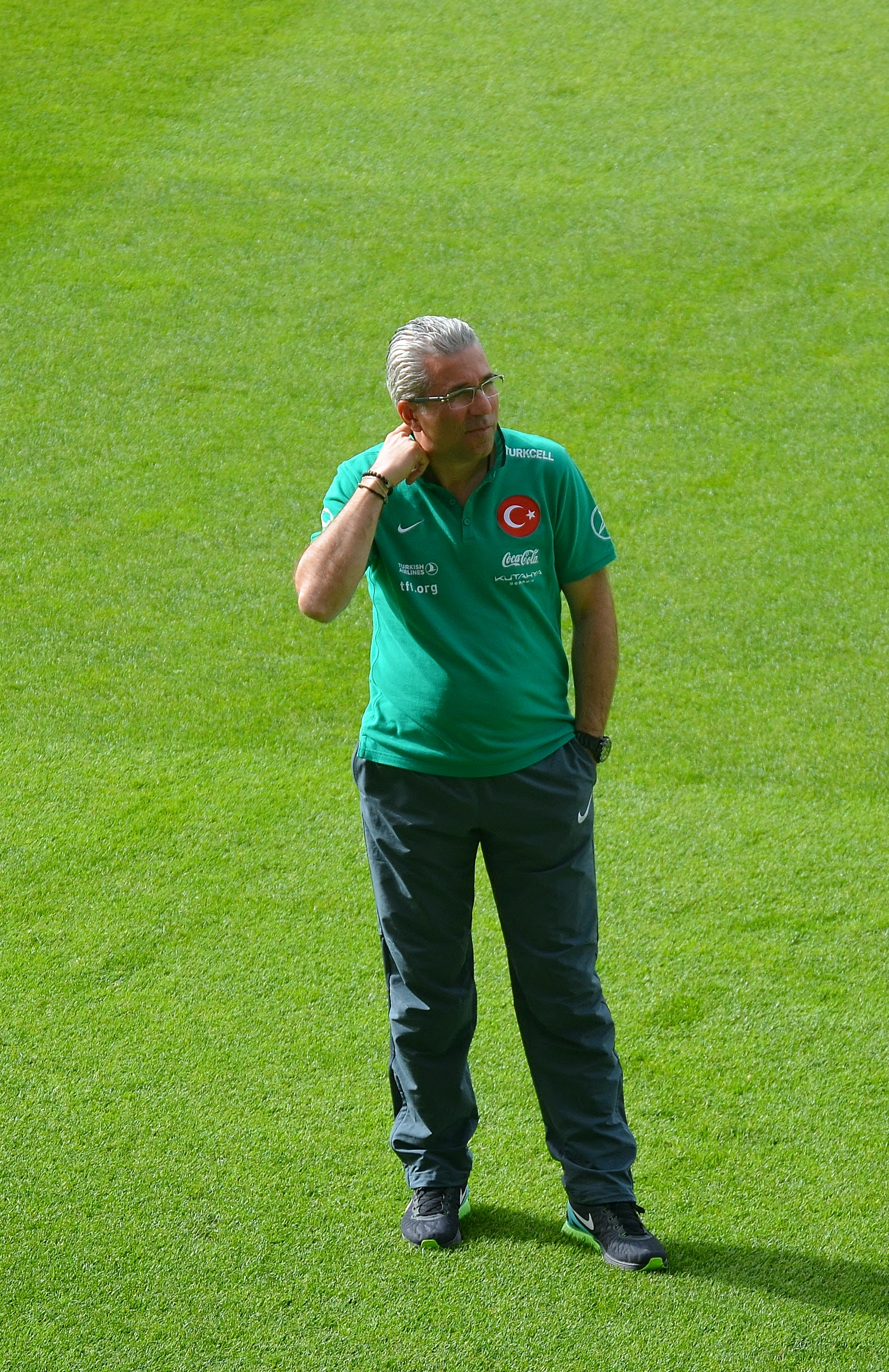
- Tuncel in 2016

Personal information
- Date of birth: 19 February 1964 (age 62)
- Place of birth: Bursa, Turkey

Managerial career
- Years: Team
- 2013–2014: Turkey girls' U17
- 2013–2014: Turkey women's U19
- 2014: Turkey women's U21
- 2015–2019: Turkey (women)

Talat Tuncel (born 19 February 1964) is a Turkish football coach and former player who most recently was the manager of the Turkey women's national team.

== Career ==
Tuncel played for various Istanbul-based clubs in the TFF Third League between 1990 and 1994.

In 2007, Tuncel began his coaching career, and between 2008 and 2011, he was responsible for the youth teams of Beşiktaş J.K. in Istanbul. He managed the Turkey girls' U17 team between 2013 and 2014, as well as the Turkey women's U19 team from 2013 to 2014. In November 2014, he took over the Turkey women's U-21 team and Turkey women's national football team from Suat Okyar. After six years of managing the Turkey women's national team, he was replaced by Necla Güngör Kırağası effective January 2020.

== Managerial statistics ==
As of 11 November 2019

Team	From	To	Record				
Team	From	To	G	W	D	L	Win %
Turkey girls' U-17	2013	2014	22	7	3	12	31.82
Turkey women's U-19	2013	2014	29	17	4	8	58.62
Turkey women's U-21	2014	2014	1	1	0	0	100.00
Turkey women's	2015	2019	41	16	5	20	39.02
Total			93	41	12	40	44.09
