= Şevval Alpavut =

Turkish footballer (born 1998)

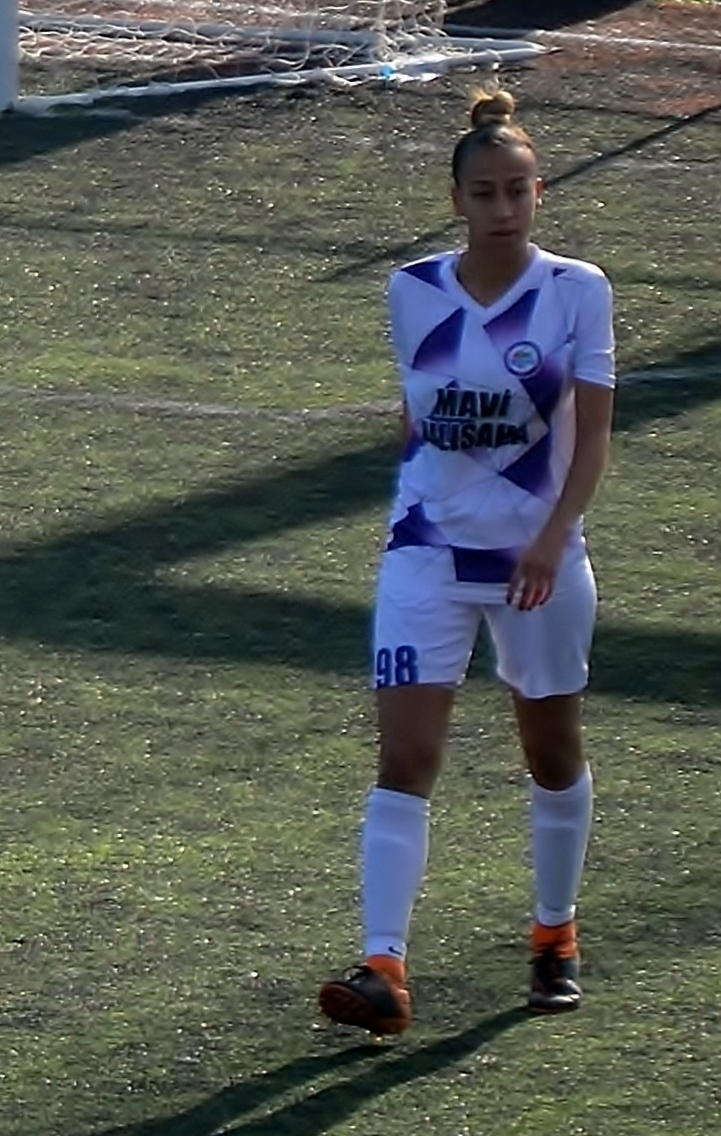
- Şevval Alpavut for Kdz. Ereğlispor in the 2017–18 season.

Personal information
- Date of birth: March 4, 1998 (age 28)
- Place of birth: Yenimahalle, Ankara, Turkey
- Position: Defender

Team information
- Current team: Ataşehir Belediyespor
- Number: 9

Senior career*
Years	Team	Apps	(Gls)
2011–2017	Fomget GS	102	(45)
2017–2018	Kdz. Ereğlispor	18	(1)
2018–	Ataşehir Belediyespor	17	(0)

International career^{‡}
2012	Turkey U-15	1	(0)
2013–2015	Turkey U-17	27	(0)
2014–2017	Turkey U-19	20	(2)
2018–	Turkey	1	(0)
- * Club domestic league appearances and goals as of January 12, 2020 ‡ National team caps and goals as of April 7, 2018

Şevval Alpavut (born March 4, 1998) is a Turkish women's football defender currently playing in the First League for Ataşehir Belediyespor with jersey number 9. She is a member of the Turkish national team.

Şevval Alpavut was born in Yenimahalle, Ankara, Turkey on March 4, 1998.

== Career ==
=== Club ===
She played with Fomget Gençlik ve Spor in her hometown between 2011 and 2017. In the 2017–18 Women's First League season, she transferred to Kdz. Ereğlispor.

In the 2018–19 league season, she transferred to Ataşehir Belediyespor.

=== International ===
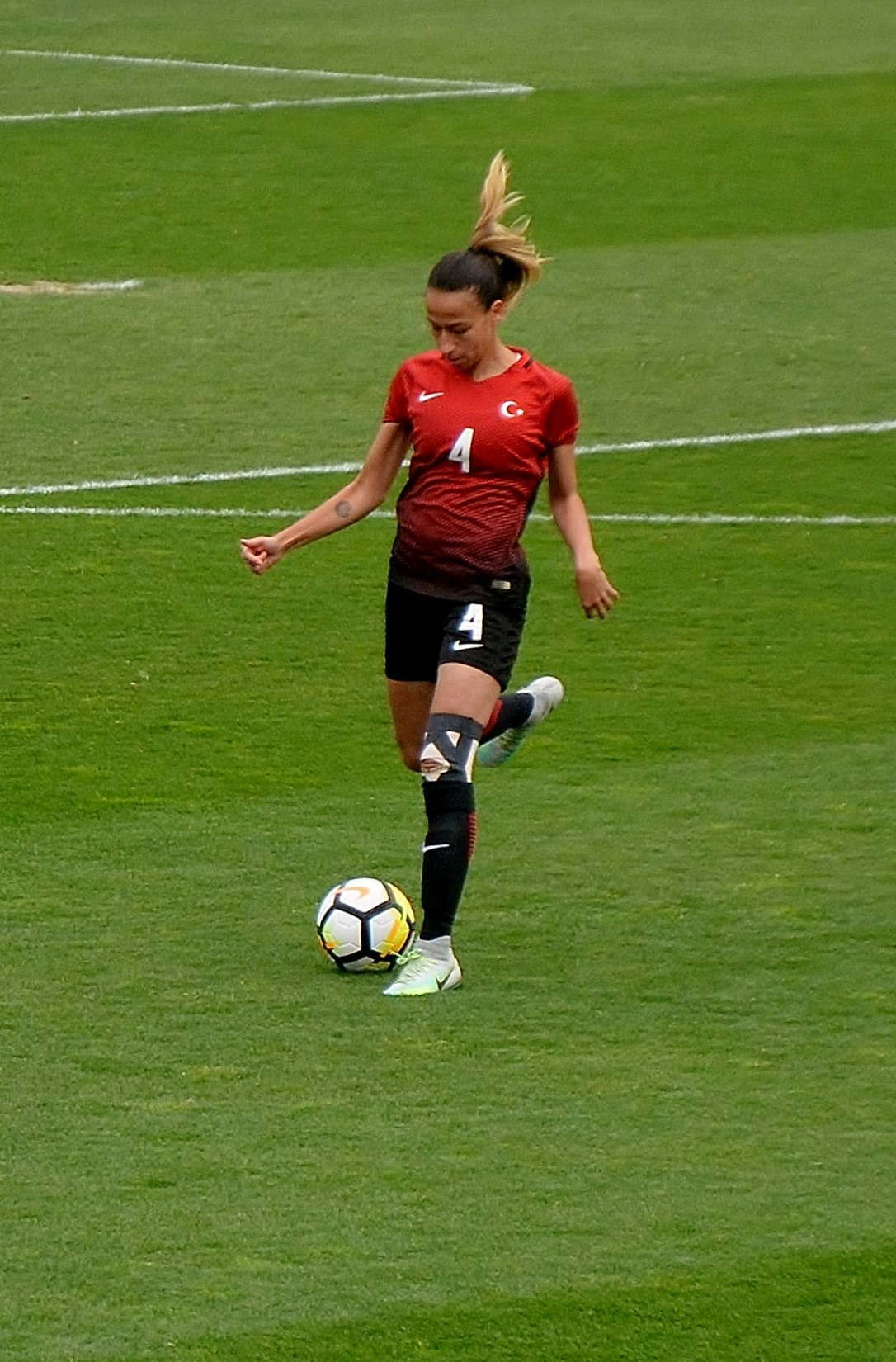
Şevval Alpavut playing for Turkey women's national team.

Alpavut played for the Turkey girls' U-15, Turkey girls' U-17, and Turkey women's U-19, before she was admitted to the Turkey women's ream.

With the Turkey girls' U-17 tean, sje took part at the 2014 UEFA Women's Under-17 Championship qualification - Group 4, 2014 UEFA Development Tournament, 2015 UEFA Women's Under-17 Championship qualification - Group 8 and 2015 UEFA Women's Under-17 Championship qualification - Elite round Group 1. She capped 27 times for the national U-17 team.

Between 2014 and 2017, she played at the 2015 UEFA Development Tournament, 2016 UEFA Women's Under-19 Championship qualification - Group 4. She scored two goals for the nTırkey U-19 team, which became champion of the 2016 UEFA Development Tournament. She took part also at the 2017 UEFA Women's Under-19 Championship qualification - Group 10 and Elite round Group 2. She scored two goals in 20 matches.

Alpavut played for the first time in the Turkey women's team at the friendly game against Estonia on 7 April 2018.

== Career statistics ==
As of January 12, 2020.

Club	Season	League			Continental		National		Total	
Club	Season	Division	Apps	Goals	Apps	Goals	Apps	Goals	Apps	Goals
Fomget GS	2010–11	Second League	1	0	–	–	0	0	1	0
Fomget GS	2011–12	First league	15	1	–	–	0	0	15	1
Fomget GS	2012–13	First league	17	2	–	–	9	0	26	2
Fomget GS	2013–14	Second League	10	4	–	–	10	0	20	4
Fomget GS	2014–15	Second League	21	7	–	–	11	0	32	7
Fomget GS	2015–16	Second League	16	12	–	–	11	2	27	14
Fomget GS	2016–17	Third League	21	19	–	–	7	0	28	19
Fomget GS	Total		102	45	–	–	48	2	150	47
Kdz. Ereğlispor	2017–18	First League	18	1	–	–	1	0	19	1
Kdz. Ereğlispor	Total		18	1	–	–	1	0	19	1
Ataşehir Belediyespor	2018–19	First League	6	0	–	–	0	0	6	0
Ataşehir Belediyespor	2019–20	First League	11	0	–	–	0	0	11	0
Ataşehir Belediyespor	Total		17	0	–	–	0	0	17	0
Career total			137	46	–	–	49	2	186	48

== Honours ==
=== International ===
UEFA Development Tournament

Turkey women's U-19
Winners (1): 2016
