= Necla Güngör =

Turkish football manager

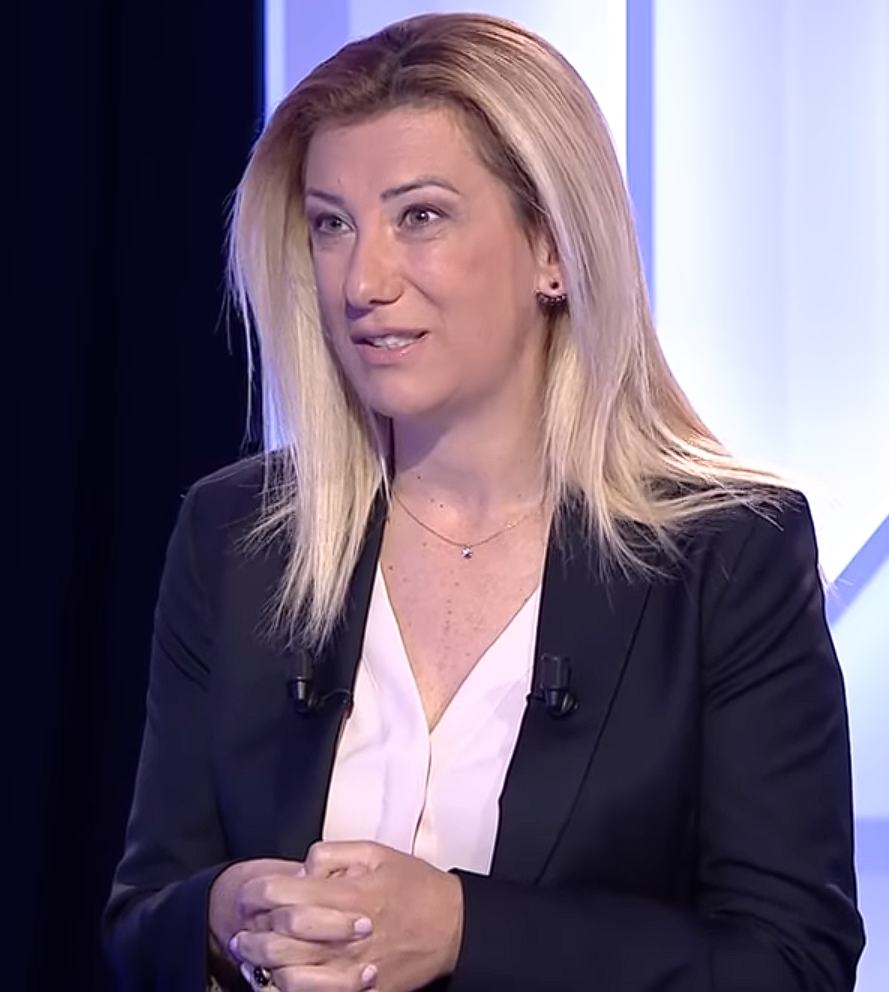

Personal information
- Full name: Necla Güngör Kıragası
- Date of birth: 15 June 1981 (age 45)
- Place of birth: Ankara, Turkey

Managerial career
- Years: Team
- 2009–2014: Turkey U-15
- 2012–2019: Turkey U-17
- 2014: Turkey U-21
- 2020–: Turkey

Necla Güngör Kıragası (born June 15, 1981) is a Turkish football coach, currently serving as the head coach of the Turkey women's national team. She was previously the manager of the Turkey girls' national U-15 and U-17 teams.

== Early years ==
Necla Güngör was born in 1981, and grew up with her two siblings in Ankara, Turkey. Despite being the granddaughter of a well-known Muslim preacher in Ankara, and the daughter of a hajji, she was supported in playing football by her family. During her childhood, she used to step in when her father's football team lacked a player on the artificial turf.

== Sports career ==
=== Club ===
Necla Güngör graduated from the School of Sport Sciences and Technology at Hacettepe University in Ankara. In 2000, she was tasked with the introduction of rhythm training to footballers by music assisting manager Ersun Yanal at Ankaragücü. The next year, she moved with him to Gençlerbirliği S.K. to instruct the infrastructure team's players in basic training. Later, she received bids from Ankaraspor. After four years, she served again under Ersun Yanal in Manisaspor.

=== National teams ===
Through Oğuz Çetin, she was introduced to the Turkish Football Federation. After nine years with men's football teams, Necla Güngör was first appointed as a trainer for the women's national team; she then became the director of the Women's Football Department of the Federation. After serving five years as a trainer, she was appointed director of football for the Turkey girls' national under-15 team, supported by Yücel Uyar, the director of the Federation's Education Department. She became the first ever female football director of a Turkish national team.

==== Turkey girls national U-17 team ====
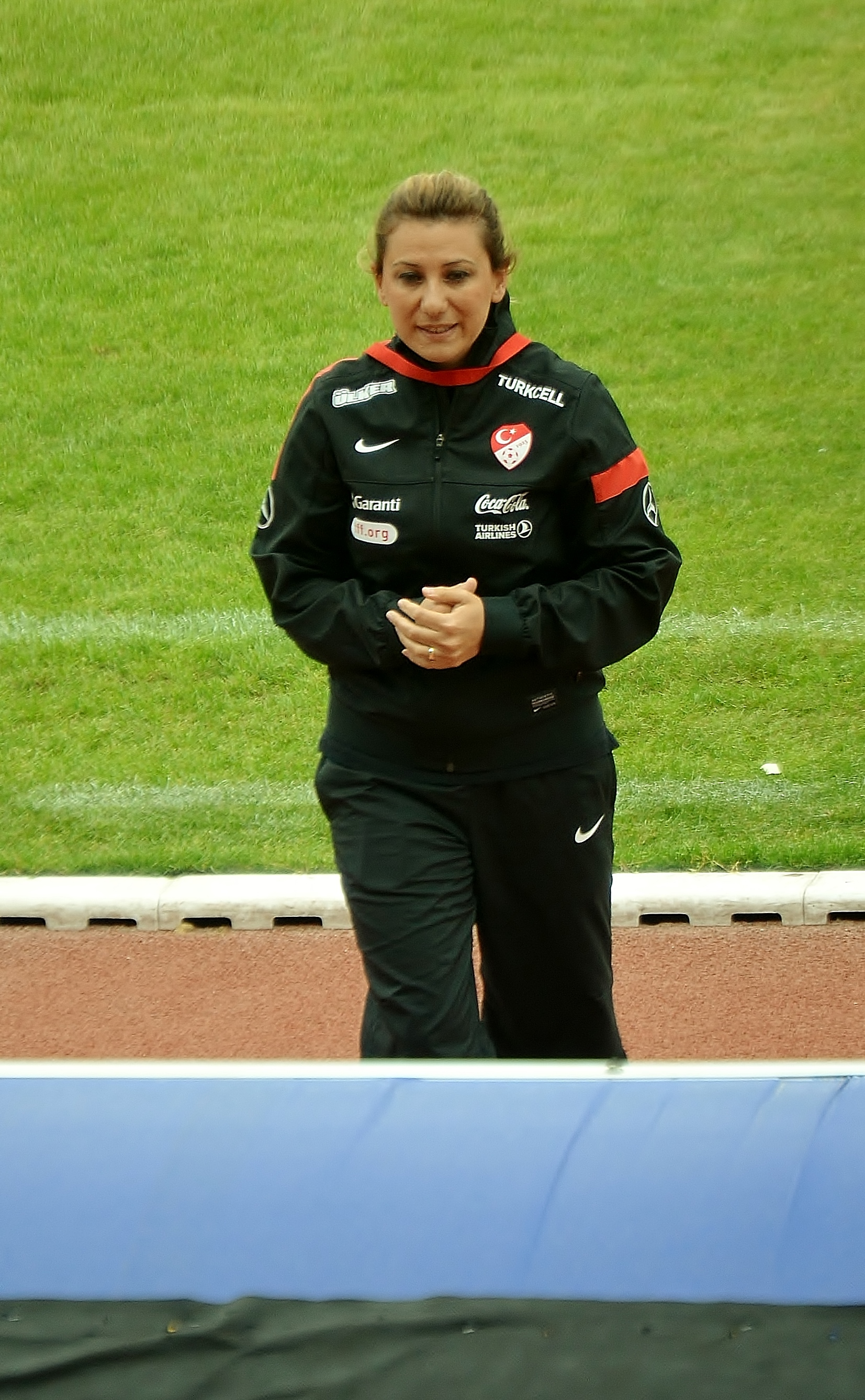
Necla Güngör Kıragası, head coach of the Turkey girls' U-17 team (April 2015)

Currently, she serves as the director of football for the Turkey girls' national U-17 team, and at the same time as a specialist in the Federation's Department of Football Development. The girls' national U-17 team under her coaching finished the 2020 UEFA Women's Under-17 Championship qualification - Group 2 at second place, and was promoted to the Elite group round.

==== Turkey women's national U-21 team ====
In November 2014, Necla Güngör coached the Turkey women's national U-21 team for two friendly matches.

==== Turkey women's national team ====
With effect of 1 January 2020, she was appointed technical director of the Turkey women's national team replacing Talat Tuncel in this position. The national team was successful in all three friendly matches in 2021.

== Managerial statistics ==
As of 28 October 2025

Team	Year	Record				
Team	Year	G	W	D	L	Win %
Turkey girls' U-17
Turkey girls' U-17	2015	11	2	1	8	18.18
Turkey girls' U-17	2016	6	1	0	5	16.67
Turkey girls' U-17	2017	16	8	1	7	50.00
Turkey girls' U-17	2018	15	5	5	5	33.33
Turkey girls' U-17	2019	8	4	2	2	50.00
Total		56	20	9	27	35.71
Turkey women's
Turkey women's	2020	6	2	1	3	33.33
Turkey women's	2021	9	5	1	3	55.56
Turkey women's	2022	9	4	1	4	44.44
Turkey women's	2023	10	8	2	0	80.00
Turkey women's	2024	10	4	1	5	40.00
Turkey women's	2025	8	4	0	4	50.00
Total		52	27	6	19	51.92
Grand total		108	47	15	46	43.52
