= Ece Tekmen =

Turkish footballer (born 2002)

Ece Tekman
Personal information
- Date of birth: 23 February 2002 (age 24)
- Place of birth: Kocaeli, Turkey
- Position: Midfielder

Team information
- Current team: Beşiktaş JK
- Number: 10

Senior career*
Years	Team	Apps	(Gls)
2015–2016	Derince Belediyespor		
2016–2018	Kocaeli Harb-İş Spor	30	(23)
2018–2020	Kocaeli Bayan FK	24	(32)
2020–	ALG Spor	47	(7)

International career^{‡}
2016	Turkey U-15	2	(4)
2017–2018	Turkey U-17	30	(6)
2019	Turkey U-19	1	(0)
2021–	Turkey	13	(0)
- * Club domestic league appearances and goals as of 18 March 2023 ‡ National team caps and goals as of 11 APril 2023

Ece Tekmen (born 23 February 2002) is a Turkish women's football midfielder, who plays for Beşiktaş JK and the Turkey women's national football team.

== Club career ==
Tekmen started her football career at the Second League women's football club Harb-İş Spor in Kocaeli.

Ahe played for the Kocaeli Bayan FK. In 2019, she suffered cruciate ligament rupture, which caused a stay off from the pitch for five months in the beginning of the 2019–20 Turkish Women's First Football League season. The team finished the 2018–19 Turkish Second Football League season as runner-up, and was promoted to the First League.

She transferred to ALG Spor in Gaziantep. She enjoyed her team's third place in the 2020–21 Turkcell Women's Football League. She enjoyed the 2021–22 Women's Super League champion title of her team. On 18 August 2022, she debuted in the 2022–23 UEFA Women's Champions League.

== International career ==
Turkey girls' U17

She was called up to the training camp of the national girls'U17 team. She internationally debuted in the friendly match against Russia on 25 January 2017. She took part in five matches of the UEFA Women's U17 Development Tournament in 2017, scoring a goal against Latvia. She played at the 2018 UEFA U17 Championship qualification – Group 7 and Elite round – Group 6 matches. She netted two goals in the friendly game against North Ireland on 6 February 2018. She participated at the 29018 UEFA Women's U16 Development Tournament, and the 2019 UEFA U7 Championship qualification – Group 6 matches. She capped 29 times in total for the Turkey girls' U17 team.

Turkey women's U19

On 10 September 2019, Tekmen played her only match for the Turkey women's U19 team.

Turkey women's

By October 2020, she was called up to the Turkey women's national football team. She played for the national team in July and September 2021.

== Career statistics ==
As of 11 April 2023

Club	Season	League			Continental		National		Total	
Club	Season	Division	Apps	Goals	Apps	Goals	Apps	Goals	Apps	Goals
Derince Belediyespor	2015–16	Second League			–	–	2	4	2	4
Derince Belediyespor	Total				–	–	2	4	2	4
Kocaeli Harb-İş Spor	2016–17	Second League	16	5	–	–	7	0	23	5
Kocaeli Harb-İş Spor	2017–18	Second League	14	18	–	–	16	5	30	23
Kocaeli Harb-İş Spor	Total		30	23	–	–	23	5	53	28
Kocaeli Bayan FK	2018–19	Second League	24	32	–	–	7	1	31	33
Kocaeli Bayan FK	2019–20	First League	0	0	–	–	1	0	1	0
Kocaeli Bayan FK	Total		24	32	–	–	8	1	32	33
ALG Spor	2020–21	First League	6	2	–	–	0	0	6	2
ALG Spor	2021–22	Super League	27	3	–	–	9	0	36	3
ALG Spor	2022–23	Super League	14	2	1	0	0	19	2	
ALG Spor	Total		47	7	1	0	13	0	61	7
Career total			101	62	1	0	46	10	148	72

== Honours ==
=== Club ===
Turkish Women's Second League

Kocaeli Bayan FK
Runner-ups (1): 2018–19

Turkish Women's First League

ALG Spor
Winners (1): 2021–22
Third places (1): 2020–21

=== Individual ===
Top goalscorer

Turkish Women's Second League
with Kocaeli Bayan FK (33 goals)
