= Atılay Canel =

Turkish football coach

Personal information
- Date of birth: January 24, 1955 (age 71)
- Place of birth: Edirne, Turkey

Managerial career
- Years: Team
- 1986–1987: Sarıyer G.K.
- 1987–1989: Pendikspor
- 2002: Turkey women
- 2003–2009: Maltepespor
- 2009–2010: Kartalspor
- 2012–: Maltepespor

Atılay Canel (born January 24, 1955) is a Turkish football coach. He served as the head coach of the Turkey women's national football team in 2002. Currently, he coaches the TFF Third League team Maltepespor.

Canel's past teams were Sarıyer G.K. (1986–1987), Pendikspor (1987–1989), Maltepespor (2003–2009) and Kartalspor (2009–2010).
