= Nur Mustafa Gülen =

Turkish football player and manager (born 1960)

Personal information
- Date of birth: July 26, 1960 (age 66)
- Place of birth: Istanbul, Turkey

Senior career*
Years	Team	Apps	(Gls)
1980–1981	Beşiktaş		
1982–1983	Sarıyerspor		
1986–1987	Sakaryaspor		
1987–1989	Çaykur Rizespor		

Managerial career
- 1999–2000: Lazio (women)
- 2000–2001: Beşiktaş
- 2001: Komabssan Konyaspor
- 2001–2002: Malatyaspor
- 2003–2004: Karşıyaka
- 2004–2006: Malatyaspor
- 2005–2006: Karşıyaka
- 2006–2007: Gaziantepspor
- 2007–2008: Yeni Burdur Gençlikspor
- 2011–2012: Turkey women
- 2012–2013: Turkey U17
- 2013–2014: Turkey women, Turkey U19, Turkey U15
- * Club domestic league appearances and goals

Nur Mustafa Gülen (born July 26, 1960) is a Turkish football coach and former footballer. Currently he is the head coach of the Turkey women's national football team.

== Career ==
Born in Istanbul on July 26, 1960, Gülen studied physical education and sports at Marmara University, graduating in 1985.

He played football in Turkish amateur and professional leagues. He was member of Beşiktaş (1980–1981), Sarıyerspor (1982–1983), Sakaryaspor (1986–1987) and Çaykur Rizespor (1987–1989) playing in the Süper Lig..

In 1996, he went to Italy and joined a technical director training program in Rome. He was appointed head coach of the Italian second-league women's team Lazio (women) in 1999. After one season, he returned home, and became assistant coach to Nevio Scala at Beşiktaş (2000–2001). Gülen served as assistant to Ziya Doğan at Kombassan Konyaspor (2001) and at Malatyaspor (2001–2002). Later, he was Feyyaz Uçar's assistant at Karşıyaka S.K. (2003–2004), at Malatyaspor (2004–2006) and again at Karşıyaka S.K. (2005–2006). Following a season as assistant to Walter Zenga at Gaziantepspor (2006–2007), Gülen became head coach serving at TFF Third League team Yeni Burdur Gençlikspor (2007–2008). Nur Mustafa Gülen was appointed coach to Turkey women's national team, serving as assistant and head coach at senior, U19, U17, and U15 teams.
