= Turkey women's national under-17 football team =

National association football team

Turkey Women's U-17
- Association: Turkish Football Federation
- Confederation: UEFA (Europe)
- Head coach: (Turkey) Nazlı Caylan Demirbağ
- Most caps: Ece Tekmen (30); As of 25 September 2018
- Top scorer: Sevgi Çınar (18); As of 21 October 2014
- FIFA code: TUR
First colours	Second colours

First international
- Turkey 0–1 Belgium (August 31, 2006)

Biggest win
- Turkey 8–0 Moldova (Bender, Moldova; August 24, 2009)

Biggest defeat
- Germany 9–1 Turkey (Krško, Slovenia; October 19, 2022)

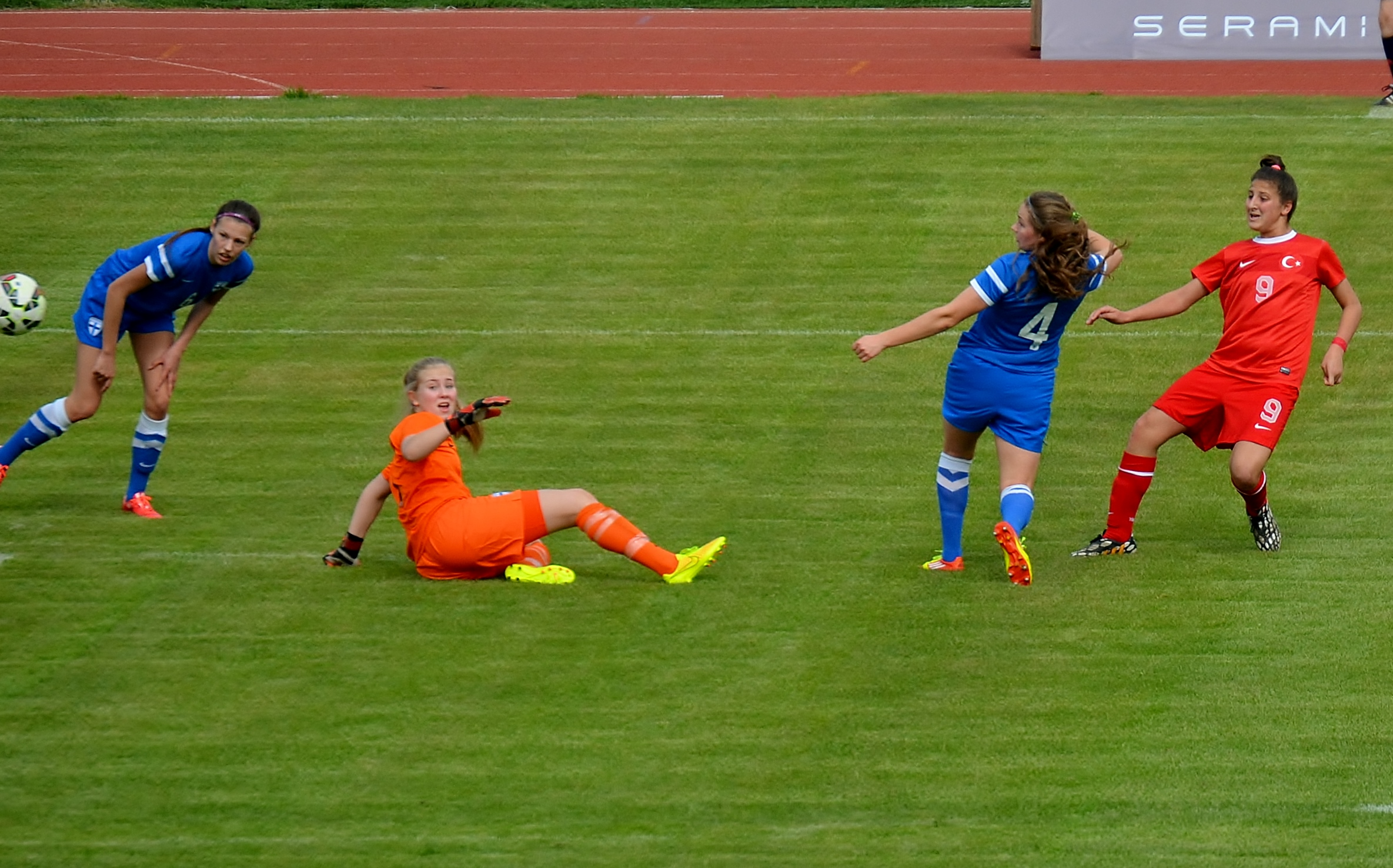
Turkey U-17 scoring a goal with Kader Hançar (red) in the 2015 UEFA Championship Second qualifying round – Group 1 match against Finland on April 11, 2015.

The Turkey women's national under-17 football team (Turkish: Türkiye 17 Yaş Altı Kız Millî Futbol Takımı) is the national under-17 football team of Turkey and is governed by the Turkish Football Federation.

== Current squad ==
As of 19 April 2022

Head coach: (Turkey) Aytürk Kıyıcı

No.	Pos.	Player	Date of birth (age)	Caps	Goals	Club
1	GK	Defne Sarıoğlu	22 April 2006 (aged 15)	3	0	(German Football Association) VfR Aalen
12	GK	Selenay Doğan	21 July 2006 (aged 15)	1	0	(Royal Belgian Football Association) R.A.E.C. Mons (1910)
2	DF	Miray Yüksek	2 August 2006 (aged 15)	1	0	(German Football Association) VfL Bochum II
4	DF	Nisa Sakallıoğlu	29 January 2007 (aged 15)	3	0	(German Football Association) SV Alberweiler
5	DF	Canset Yiğit	26 October 2006 (aged 15)	3	0	(Turkish Football Federation) Kayseri Kadın FK
11	DF	Tuana Demirbaş	14 December 2006 (aged 15)	5	1	(Turkish Football Federation) Altay S.K.
15	DF	Zehra Naz Eker	29 September 2007 (aged 14)	2	0	(Turkish Football Federation) Akdeniz Nurçelik Spor
21	DF	Beril Beceren	20 January 2006 (aged 16)	2	0	(Turkish Football Federation) Dudullu Spor
22	DF	Gülşah Güvendi	6 October 2006 (aged 15)	2	0	(Turkish Football Federation) Konak Belediyespor
3	MF	Aysha Sultan Tural	21 September 2006 (aged 15)	3	0	(United States Soccer Federation) Real Jersey FC
6	MF	Havin Özsoy	14 April 2006 (aged 16)	3	0	(German Football Association) FC Speyer 09
8	MF	Ecemnur Öztürk	23 October 2007 (aged 14)	3	0	(Turkish Football Federation) Dudullu Spor
10	MF	Melisa Kurt	18 March 2007 (aged 15)	3	0	(Royal Belgian Football Association) RSC Anderlecht
17	MF	Defnesu Aldemir	8 March 2006 (aged 16)	3	0	(Turkish Football Federation) Dudullu Spor
20	MF	Aliya Polat	29 August 2007 (aged 14)	3	0	(German Football Association) VfL Bochum II
7	FW	Aleyna Eslem Topçu	20 April 2006 (aged 15)	10	1	(French Football Federation) Paris Saint-Germain
13	FW	Tuana Naz Türçin	23 May 2006 (aged 15)	3	0	(Turkish Football Federation) Dudullu Spor
14	FW	Zeynep Bilir	12 April 2007 (aged 15)	3	1	(Turkish Football Federation) Kayseri Kadın FK

== Results and fixtures ==
- The following is a list of match results in the last 12 months, as well as any future matches that have been scheduled.
- Friendly matches are not included.

Win Draw Lose Fixtures

== Individual records ==
=== Most capped players ===
Players in bold are still active. As of 25 September 2019

#	Name	Career	Caps	Goals
1	Ece Tekmen	2017–2018	30	6
2	Şevval Alpavut	2012–2015	27	0
2	Elif Keskin	2017–2018	27	3
4	Melike Öztürk	2016–2018	25	13
5	Berivan İçen	2017–2020	24	12
5	Mesude Alayont	2018–2020	24	11
7	İlayda Civelek	2012–2015	23	3
8	Kader Hançar	2014–2015	21	11
9	Ece Türkoğlu	2014–2015	20	5
10	Aylin Dişli	2011–2013	18	0
10	Derya Arhan	2013–2015	18	2

=== Top goalscorers ===
Goalscorers with an equal number of goals are ranked in chronological order of reaching the milestone. Bold indicates still active players. As of 25 September 2019

#	Name	Career	Goals	Caps	Rate
1	Sevgi Çınar	2009–2010	18	16	1.13
2	Selin Sivrikaya	2013–2014	13	9	1.44
2	Melike Öztürk	2016–2018	13	25	0.52
4	Ebru Topçu	2011–2013	12	16	0.75
4	Berivan İçen	2017–2020	12	24	.050
6	Kader Hançar	2014–2015	11	21	0.52
6	Mesude Alayont	2018–2020	11	24	0.46
8	Gülbin Hız	2009–2010	8	16	0.50
9	Eylül Elgalp	2006–2007	6	10	0.60
9	Ece Tekmen	2017–2018	6	30	0.20

== Managers ==
As of 19 April 2022

Manager	Years	G	W	D	L	Win %
Ali Kızılet	2006–2008	14	5	2	7	35.71
Hamdi Aslan	2009–2010	13	8	2	3	61.54
Taygun Erdem	2010–2012	10	6	0	4	60.00
Nur Mustafa Gülen	2012	4	2	0	2	50.00
Talat Tuncel	2013–2014	22	7	3	12	31.82
Necla Güngör Kırağası	2015–2019	56	21	9	26	37.50
Begüm Üresin	2020	2	1	1	0	50.00
Nazlı Ceylan Demirbağ	2021-	11	4	3	4	36.36
Total	2006-2022	132	54	20	58	40.91

== See also ==
- Women's football in Turkey
- Turkey women's national football team
- Turkey women's national under-21 football team
- Turkey women's national under-19 football team
