= Yücel Uyar =

Turkish football player and manager (born 1960)

Personal information
- Date of birth: 2 April 1960 (age 66)
- Place of birth: Alaçam, Samsun, Turkey
- Position: Left-back

Senior career*
Years	Team	Apps	(Gls)
1989–1993	Samsunspor		

Managerial career
- 1999–2002: Samsunspor
- 2002: Orduspor
- 2003–2004: Eyüpspor
- 2004–2005: Samsunspor
- 2006–2007: Ünyespor
- 2011: Turkey women
- * Club domestic league appearances and goals

Yücel Uyar (born 2 April 1960) is a Turkish football coach and former player. In 2011, he was the head coach of the Turkey women's national team.

== Career ==
A left-back, Uyar played in the TFF Second League team of his home town Samsunspor from 1989 to 1993, ending his active player career at the end of the season.

Between 1999 and 2001, he was appointed staff member for developing and training young players at Samsunspor. In the 2001–02 season, Uyar was head coach of the team. After a brief time at Orduspor in 2002, he transferred to Eyüpspor for the 2003–04 season. Returning to Samsunspor in 2004, he took over the responsibility again for the youth and juniors. He was appointed head coach but resigned after a short while. Finally, he was transferred to Ünyespor, where he managed for one year until January 2007.

In 2006, Uyar's name was mentioned in a sports corruption scandal in relation to an investigation into match fixing between Samsunspor and Fenerbahçe S.K. in the 2000–01 Süper Lig season, after which the latter won the league championship title. He sued the person who had alleged his involvement in the scandal, and won the case in the court, which attested his innocence and sentenced that person to a fine of ₺5,000 in 2008.

Uyar was appointed coach of the Turkey U20 national team. He became head coach of the Turkey women's national team in 2011. He was director for football development at the Turkish Football Federation.
