= Hamdi Aslan =

Turkish football player and manager (born 1967)

Personal information
- Date of birth: 6 September 1967 (age 59)
- Place of birth: Akçaabat, Trabzon, Turkey
- Position: Defender

Youth career
- 1987–1990: Trabzonspor

Senior career*
Years	Team	Apps	(Gls)
1990–1996	Trabzonspor	156	(16)
1996–1999	Adanaspor	88	(23)

International career
1985–1986	Turkey U18	9	(3)
1987–1989	Turkey U21	9	(0)
1987–1988	Turkey Olympic	6	(0)

Managerial career
- 2005–2006: Akçaabat Sebatspor
- 2006–2010: Turkey women
- * Club domestic league appearances and goals

Hamdi Aslan (born 6 September 1967) is a Turkish football coach and former footballer. Between 2006 and 2010, he served as the head coach of the Turkey women's national team.

== Club career ==
Aslan began his playing career at his local club Trabzonspor's youth team. Between 1990 and 1996, he played in the senior team, the first season in the |TFF First League, and then in the Süper Lig. During this time, he capped 156 times and scored 16 goals in the league matches, and enjoyed three Turkish Cup, two President's Cup and three Prime Minister's Cup titles with his club. In the 1996–97 season, Aslan transferred to the TFF Second League club Adanaspor, where he appeared in 88 matches and netted 23 goals in total.

Aslan is remembered for his fair play and his head goals for Trabzonspor.

== International career ==
Aslan was admitted to the Turkey U-18 team, and debuted in the 1986 UEFA European Under-18 Championship qualifying – Group 8 match against the Czech team on 18 April 1985. Aslan took part in three of the six matches at the tournament. He capped 9 times for the Turkey youth team.

His first appearance in the Turkey U-21 was in the friendly match against Romanian juniors on 3 March 1987. He played in one of the four matches at the 1988 UEFA European Under-21 Championship – Qualifying Stage Group 4, and in five of the six matches at the 1990 UEFA European Under-21 Championship – Qualifying Stage Group 3. Aslan capped nine times for the Turkey U-21 team.

He was seven times part of the Turkey national football team, six of them at the 1987 Mediterranean Cup.

== Managerial career ==
Hamdi Aslan managed the team Akçaabat Sebatspor in his hometown in the 2005–06 season, before he was appointed head coach of the Turkey women's national team in 2006. Coaching also the women's junior and girls' youth teams, he served at this position until 2010.

== Career statistics ==
Appearances and goals by club, season and competition
Club	Season	League			Cups		Continental		National		Total	
Club	Season	Division	Apps	Goals	Apps	Goals	Apps	Goals	Apps	Goals	Apps	Goals
Trabzonspor	1989–1991	TFF First League	29	0	4	0	–		5	0	38	0
Trabzonspor	1991–92	Süper Lig	28	8	5	2	–		0	0	33	10
Trabzonspor	1992–93	Süper Lig	29	3	5	0	–		0	0	34	3
Trabzonspor	1993–94	Süper Lig	30	1	4	0	–		0	0	34	1
Trabzonspor	1994–95	Süper Lig	24	3	7	0	–		0	0	31	3
Trabzonspor	1995–96	Süper Lig	16	1	1	0	–		0	0	17	1
Trabzonspor	Total		156	16	26	2	0	0	5	0	187	18
Adanaspor	1996–97	TFF Second League	35	18	–		–		0	0	35	18
Adanaspor	1997–98	TFF Second League	32	3	–		–		0	0	32	3
Adanaspor	1998–99	Süper Lig	21	2	4	0	–		0	0	25	2
Adanaspor	Total		88	23	4	0	0	0	0	0	92	23
Career total			244	39	30	2	0	0	5	0	279	41

== Honours ==
Trabzonspor

- Turkish Cup: 1991–92, 1994–95
