= Turkey women's national football team =

Women's national association football team representing Turkey

Türkiye
- Nickname(s): Ay-Yıldızlılar (The Crescent-Stars); Bizim Çocuklar (Our Girls)
- Association: Türkiye Futbol Federasyonu (TFF)
- Confederation: UEFA (Europe)
- Head coach: Necla Güngör Kıragası
- Captain: Didem Karagenç
- Most caps: Ebru Topçu (100)
- Top scorer: Yağmur Uraz (28)
- Home stadium: Various
- FIFA code: TUR
First colours	Second colours

FIFA ranking
- Current: 47 ▼1 (20 October 2026)
- Highest: 51 (April 2026)
- Lowest: 75 (December 2007)

First international
- Turkey 0–8 Romania (Istanbul, Turkey; 8 September 1995)

Biggest win
- Turkey 9–0 Georgia (Adana, Turkey; 23 November 2006)

Biggest defeat
- Turkey 1–12 Germany (Istanbul, Turkey; 14 February 1999)

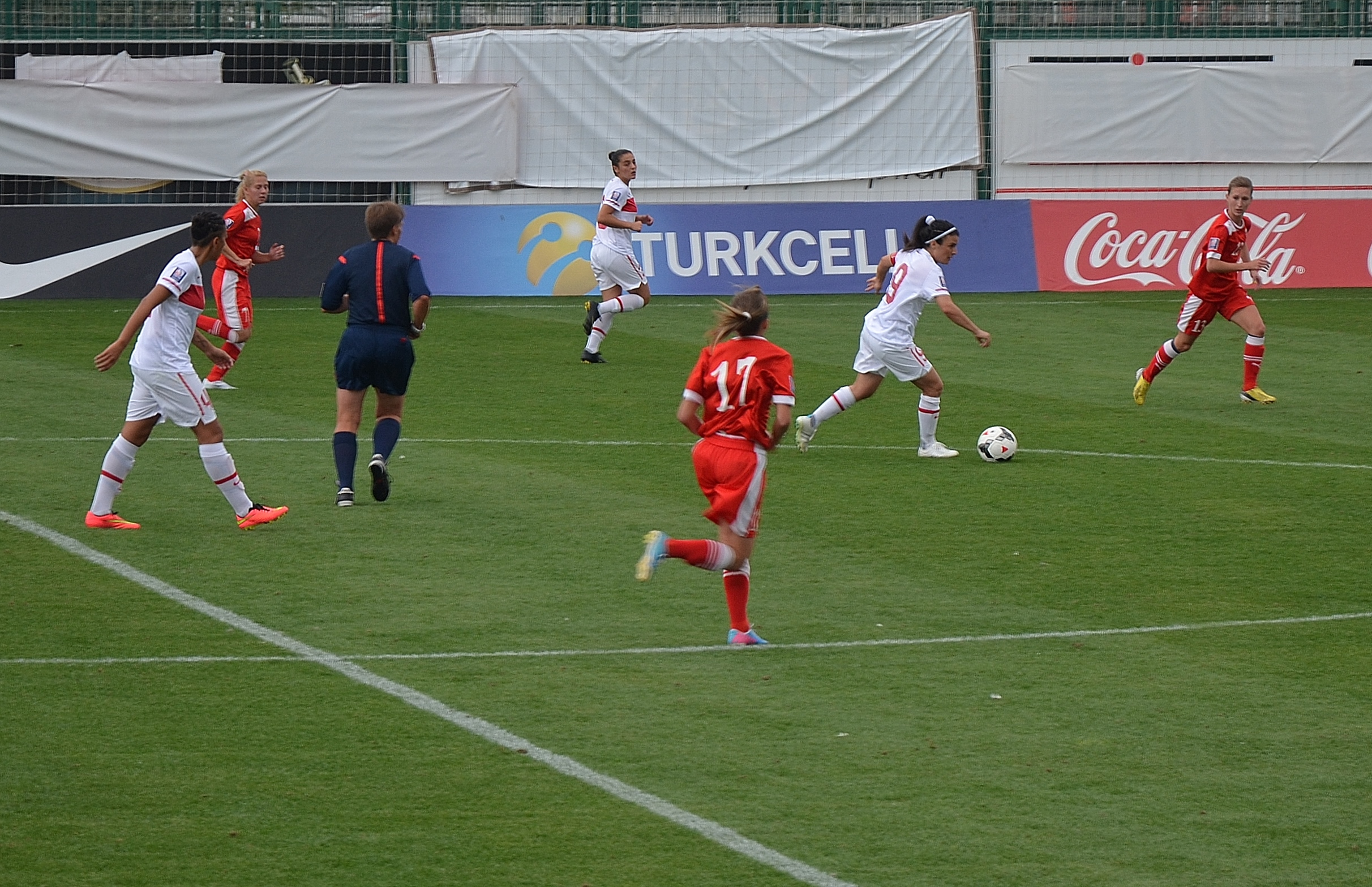
Turkey attacking Belarus with Bilgin Defterli on 17 September 2014.

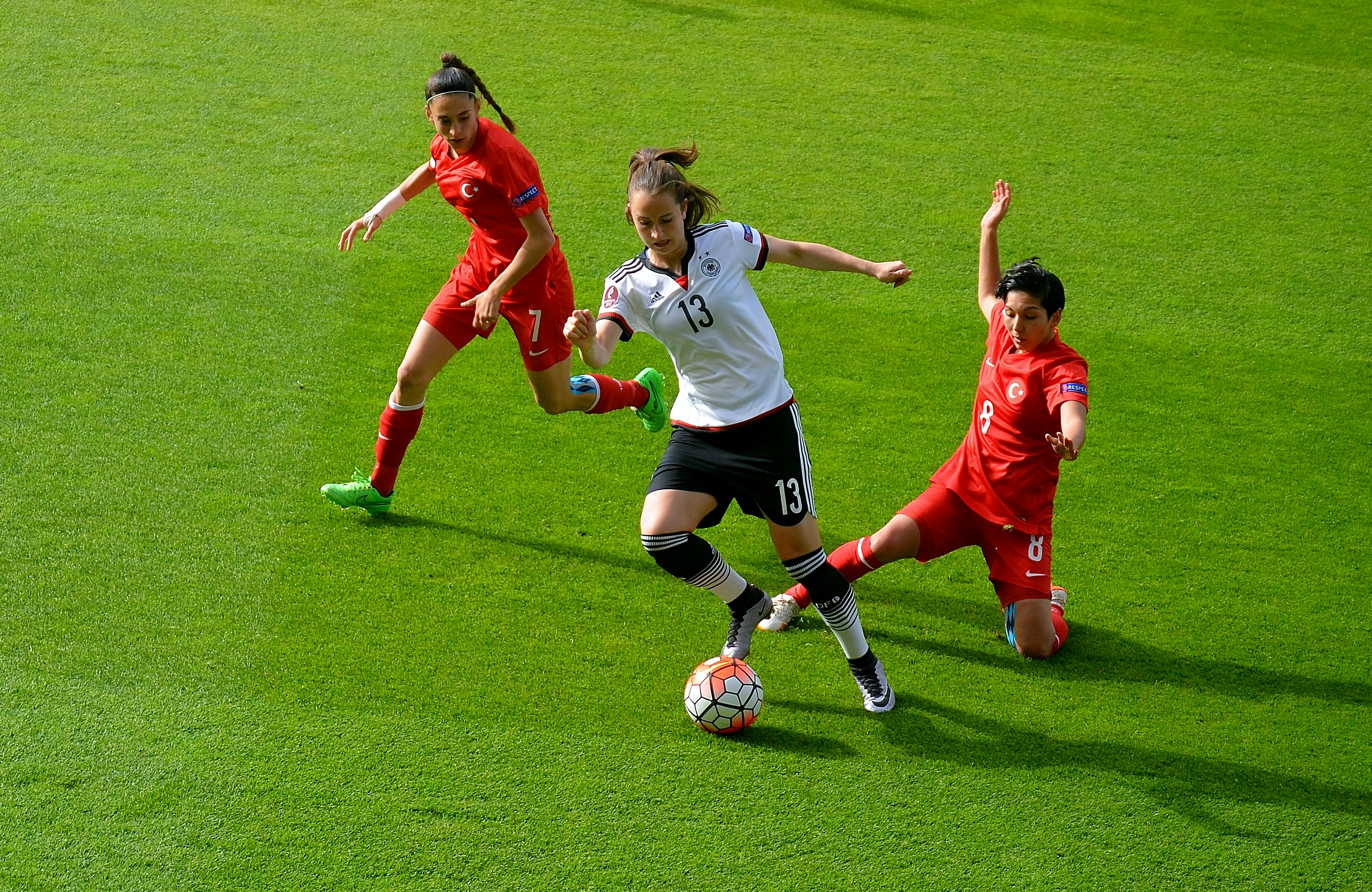
Turkey's attack being stopped by Sara Däbritz (white/black) of Germany at the UEFA Women's Euro 2017 qualifying Group 5 match on 8 April 2016.

The Turkey women's national football team (Turkish: Türkiye kadın millî futbol takımı) represents Turkey in international women's football. The team was established in 1995, and compete in the qualification for UEFA Women's Championship and the UEFA qualifying of FIFA Women's World Cup. It has been recognized as Türkiye by the FIFA and UEFA since 2022.

The Turkish Football Federation (TFF) is the sports organizing body responsible for forming the women's teams in four age categories as the women's national A team, the women's U-19 national team, the girls' U-17 national team and the girls' U-15 national team.

The women's U-19 national team was formed firstly in 2001, and participate at qualifications for the UEFA Women's Under-19 Championship. The girls' U-17 national team was founded in 2006. They play in the qualifications of the UEFA Women's Under-17 Championship. Established in 2009 with the main objective to develop players for future, the girls' U-15 national team take part at the Youth Olympic Games and various tournaments.

== History ==
The first recorded international match of the Turkey women's national team was the friendly game against Romania held at Zeytinburnu Stadium in Istanbul, Turkey on 8 September 1995, which ended in a 0–8 defeat for the Turkish nationals. The team took part at the UEFA Women's Euro 1997 qualifying round and debuted in the away match against Hungary on 4 October 1995, losing 0–6.

The nationals won their first match against Georgia at the 1999 FIFA Women's World Cup qualification round on 25 September 1997 after eleven losses.

The biggest loss of the Turkey women's national team was against Germany with 1–12 in a friendly match on 14 February 1999. The team's biggest win was with 9–0 against Georgia at the UEFA Women's Euro 2009 qualifying match on 23 November 2006.

The women's national team were not formed in the years 2003, 2004 and 2005 because the women's football in Turkey was suspended during this period.

Turkey put up its best performance in the 2023 FIFA Women's World Cup qualification, as Turkey acquired an important draw over Portugal and three wins, though the team still failed to qualify at the end.

== Team image ==
=== Nicknames ===
The Turkey women's national football team has been known or nicknamed as the "Crescent Stars (Ay-Yıldızlılar)".

=== Home stadium ===
Turkey play their home matches on TFF Riva Facility, a facility of the Turkish Football Federation (TFF) for camp and training purposes of all Turkey national football teams. It is located in Riva, Beykoz district of Istanbul Province, Turkey.

== Results and fixtures ==
The following is a list of match results in the last 12 months, as well as any future matches that have been scheduled.

Legend

Win Draw Loss Fixture

=== 2025 ===
28 November Friendly	Albania	1–1	Turkey	Istanbul, Turkey
19:00	Hilaj 20'		Topçu 50'	Stadium: Esenyurt Necmi Kadıoğlu Stadium; Referee: Lutfaliyeva (AZE), Nuriyeva(AZE), Akbarzada (AZE)

1 December 2025 Friendly	Turkey	2–0	Albania	Istanbul, Turkey
19:00	Şeker 14'; Altunkulak 81'			Stadium: THY Fielad; Referee: Lutfaliyeva (AZE), Nuriyeva(AZE), Akbarzada (AZE)

=== 2026 ===
3 March 2027 FIFA Women's World Cup qualification	Turkey	3–0	Malta	Istanbul, Turkey
17:00 TRT (UTC+03:00)	Farrugia 7' (o.g.); Topçu 29'; Karabulut 88'	Report		Stadium: Pendik Stadium; Attendance: 275; Referee: Eugenia Gil Soriano (Spain)

7 March 2027 FIFA Women's World Cup qualification	Northern Ireland	0–1	Turkey	Lurgan, Northern Ireland
19:00 GMT (UTC+00:00)		Report	Türkoğlu 24'	Stadium: Mourneview Park; Attendance: 2,186; Referee: Olivia Tschon (Austria)

14 April 2027 FIFA Women's World Cup qualification	Switzerland	3–1	Turkey	Zurich, Switzerland
19:00 CEST (UTC+02:00)	Csillag 49', 75'; Calligaris 80'	Report	Topçu 52'	Stadium: Letzigrund; Attendance: 12,355; Referee: Sofiya Prychyna (Ukraine)

18 April 2027 FIFA Women's World Cup qualification	Turkey	1–1	Switzerland	Sinop, Turkey
19:00 TRT (UTC+03:00)	Altınkulak 79'	Report	Crnogorčević 52'	Stadium: Sinop Şehir Stadium; Attendance: 5,981; Referee: Katalin Kulcsár (Hungary)

5 June 2027 FIFA Women's World Cup qualification	Turkey	2–1	Northern Ireland	Istanbul, Turkey
20:00 TRT (UTC+03:00)	Pekel 26'; Şeker 48'	Report	Bell 45' (pen.)	Stadium: Pendik Stadium; Attendance: 1,117; Referee: Alexandra Collin (France)

9 June 2027 FIFA Women's World Cup qualification	Malta	0–3	Turkey	Ta' Qali, Malta
19:00 CEST (UTC+02:00)		Report	Gatt 8' (o.g.); Türkoğlu 38'; Altunkulak 52'	Stadium: Centenary Stadium; Attendance: 994; Referee: Sabina Bolić (Croatia)

9 October 2027 FIFA Women's World Cup qualification play-offs	Turkey	3–3	Slovenia	Istanbul, Turkey
19:00 TRT (UTC+03:00)	Hançar 18' (pen.); Altunkulak 25', 75'	Report	Kajzba 62', 90+3'; Kastelec 81' Kastelec	Stadium: Pendik Stadium; Referee: Lina Lehtovaara (Finland)

13 October 2027 FIFA Women's World Cup qualification play-offs	Slovenia	2–0	Turkey	Domžale, Slovenia
17:00 CEST (UTC+02:00)	Sternad 83'; Kastelec 90+3'	Report		Stadium: Domžale Sports Park; Referee: Eugenia Gil Soriano (Spain)

== All-time records ==
The following table shows Turkey women's all-time international record As of 17 July 2023:

Period	Pl	W	D	L	GF	GA
1995–2023	151	53	18	80	236	367

== Matches by year ==
As of 13 October 2026

Year	Total	Official	Friendly
1995	4	2	2
1996	6	4	2
1997	5	4	1
1998	8	6	2
1999	6	3	3
2000	3	3	0
2001	7	4	3
2002	6	4	2
2006	3	3	0
2007	2	2	0
2008	5	5	0
2009	5	5	0
2010	6	6	0
2011	9	5	4
2012	5	5	0
2013	3	3	0
2014	7	7	0
2015	9	5	4
2016	3	3	0
2017	7	3	4
2018	4	0	4
2019	10	5	5
2020	6	5	1
2021	9	5	4
2022	9	5	4
2023	10	6	4
2024	10	8	2
2025	10	8	2
2026	8	8	0
Total	185	132	53

== Coaching staff ==
=== Current coaching staff ===
As of 17 July 2023

Position	Name
Head coach	(Turkey) Necla Güngör Kıragası
Assistant coach(es)	(Turkey) Begüm Üresin
Assistant coach(es)	(Turkey) Hilal Başkol
Goalkeeping coach	(Turkey) Sinan Sevim
Director of football development	(Turkey) Oğuz Çetin

=== Manager history ===
As of 13 October 2026

Name	Period	Pld	W	D	L	GF	GA	GD	Win %	Ref
Atılay Canel	2002	2	0	0	2	3	7	−4	0	
Hamdi Aslan	2006–2010	21	12	3	6	56	33	+23	57.1	
Yücel Uyar	2011	8	1	2	5	8	25	−17	12.5	
Nur Mustafa Gülen	2011–2012	4	0	0	4	1	16	−15	0	
Nur Mustafa Gülen	2013–2014	8	3	0	5	9	23	−14	37.5	
Ogün Temizkanoğlu	2012	2	0	0	2	1	13	−12	0	
Suat Okyar	2014	2	1	0	1	3	8	−5	50	
Talat Tuncel	2015–2019	33	12	5	16	51	65	−14	36.4	
Necla Güngör Kıragası	2020–	62	32	9	21	104	75	+29	51.6	

== Players ==
=== Current squad ===
The following players were called up for the 2027 FIFA Women's World Cup qualification – UEFA play-offs matches against Slovenia on 9 and 13 October 2026, respectively.

Caps and goals correct as of 13 October 2026, after the match against Slovenia.

No.	Pos.	Player	Date of birth (age)	Caps	Goals	Club
1	GK	Selda Akgöz	9 June 1993 (age 33)	55	0	(Turkish Football Federation) Beşiktaş
12	GK	Göknur Güleryüz	4 February 2003 (age 23)	1	0	(French Football Federation) Toulouse
23	GK	Gamze Nur Yaman	25 April 1999 (age 27)	19	0	(Turkish Football Federation) Trabzonspor
34	GK	Sudenur Yolcu	5 August 2003 (age 23)	0	0	(Turkish Football Federation) Sultanbeyli Gücü
2	DF	Meryem Küçükbirinci	3 March 2004 (age 22)	8	0	(Turkish Football Federation) Beşiktaş
3	DF	Fatma Şakar	26 March 1999 (age 27)	11	0	(Turkish Football Federation) Fenerbahçe
4	DF	Eda Karataş	15 June 1995 (age 31)	40	0	(Turkish Football Federation) Galatasaray
5	DF	İpek Kaya	28 October 1994 (age 32)	41	0	(Turkish Football Federation) Fenerbahçe
15	DF	Kezban Tağ	17 September 1993 (age 33)	25	1	(Turkish Football Federation) Ankara BB Fomget
17	DF	İlayda Civelek	6 July 1998 (age 28)	54	2	(Turkish Football Federation) Beşiktaş
18	DF	Ece Tekmen	23 February 2002 (age 24)	16	0	(Turkish Football Federation) Beşiktaş
20	DF	Cansu Nur Kaya	28 February 2000 (age 26)	14	0	(Turkish Football Federation) Beşiktaş
	DF	Sejde Abrahamsson	24 January 1998 (age 28)	16	1	(Turkish Football Federation) Ankara BB Fomget
	DF	Rabianur Küçük	29 August 2003 (age 23)	0	0	(Turkish Football Federation) Galatasaray
	DF	Elif Keskin	12 January 2002 (age 24)	53	5	(Turkish Football Federation) Trabzonspor
6	MF	Selen Altunkulak	2 December 1997 (age 28)	22	13	(French Football Federation) Toulouse
7	MF	Arzu Karabulut	30 January 1991 (age 35)	60	7	(Turkish Football Federation) Ankara BB Fomget
10	MF	Ebru Topçu	27 August 1996 (age 30)	102	27	(Turkish Football Federation) Galatasaray
11	MF	Tuana Mahmoud	3 March 2003 (age 23)	2	0	(German Football Association) Werder Bremen
14	MF	Halle Houssein	11 December 2004 (age 21)	8	0	(The Football Association) Sheffield United
16	MF	Ece Türkoğlu	14 April 1999 (age 27)	58	12	(Turkish Football Federation) Fenerbahçe
19	MF	Busem Şeker	19 July 1998 (age 28)	55	8	(Turkish Football Federation) Fenerbahçe
19	MF	Nihal Saraç	9 January 2006 (age 20)	0	0	(Turkish Football Federation) Beşiktaş
	MF	Başak İçinözbebek	13 February 1994 (age 32)	6	0	(Turkish Football Federation) Trabzonspor
	MF	Elanaz Demirbaş	18 June 2009 (age 17)	0	0	(German Football Association) Eintracht Frankfurt II
8	FW	Melike Pekel	14 April 1995 (age 31)	43	10	(Turkish Football Federation) Galatasaray
9	FW	Kader Hançar	12 November 1999 (age 27)	41	12	(Mexican Football Federation) Club Tijuana
13	FW	Vildan Kardeşler	24 February 1998 (age 28)	5	0	(German Football Association) SC Sand
22	FW	Melike Öztürk	1 April 2001 (age 25)	18	0	(Turkish Football Federation) Galatasaray
	FW	Sibel Ağırman	4 September 2007 (age 19)	0	0	(German Football Association) Eintracht Frankfurt II

=== Recent call-ups ===
The following players have also been called up to the squad within the past 12 months.

Pos.	Player	Date of birth (age)	Caps	Goals	Club	Latest call-up
GK	Selda Akgöz ^{WD}	9 June 1993 (age 33)	62	0	(Turkey) ABB Fomget	v. Northern Ireland, 5 June 2026
GK	Ezgi Çağlar ^{PRE}	3 July 1991 (age 35)	15	0	(Turkey) Beşiktaş	v. Malta, 3 March 2026
DF	Meryem Başkaya ^{PRE}	14 July 2005 (age 21)	0	0	(Denmark) Odense	v. Northern Ireland, 5 June 2026
DF	Elif Keskin	12 January 2002 (age 24)	51	5	(Turkey) Galatasaray	v. Switzerland, 18 April 2026
DF	İlayda Cansu Kara	April 28, 2005 (age 21)	2	0	(United States) Coastal Carolina	v. Malta, 3 March 2026
DF	Didem Karagenç	16 October 1993 (age 33)	74	3	(Turkey) Beşiktaş	v. Kosovo, 28 October 2025
DF	Yaşam Göksu	25 September 1995 (age 31)	11	0	(Turkey) Fenerbahçe	v. Kosovo, 28 October 2025
DF	Selin Cemal Başdüdükçü	December 27, 2006 (age 19)	0	0	(England) West Ham United	v. Kosovo, 28 October 2025
MF	Başak İçinözbebek ^{PRE}	13 February 1994 (age 32)	6	0	(Turkey) ABB Fomget	v. Northern Ireland, 5 June 2026
MF	Derya Arhan ^{PRE}	25 January 1999 (age 27)	21	3	(Turkey) Yüksekova	v. Switzerland, 14 April 2026
MF	Kevser Kartal ^{PRE}	30 October 2001 (age 25)	0	0	(Turkey) Amed	v. Switzerland, 14 April 2026
MF	Meryem Cennet Çal	12 July 2000 (age 26)	24	1	(Turkey) Beşiktaş	v. Kosovo, 28 October 2025
FW	Sibel Ağırman ^{PRE}	4 September 2007 (age 19)	0	0	(Germany) Eintracht Frankfurt	v. Northern Ireland, 5 June 2026
FW	Birgül Sadıkoğlu	1 January 1994 (age 32)	40	8	(Turkey) Trabzonspor	v. Malta, 3 March 2026
Notes: ^{INJ} = Withdrew due to injury; ^{PRE} = Preliminary squad / standby; ^{RET} = Retired from the national team; ^{WD} = Withdrew due to non-injury issue

== Gallery ==
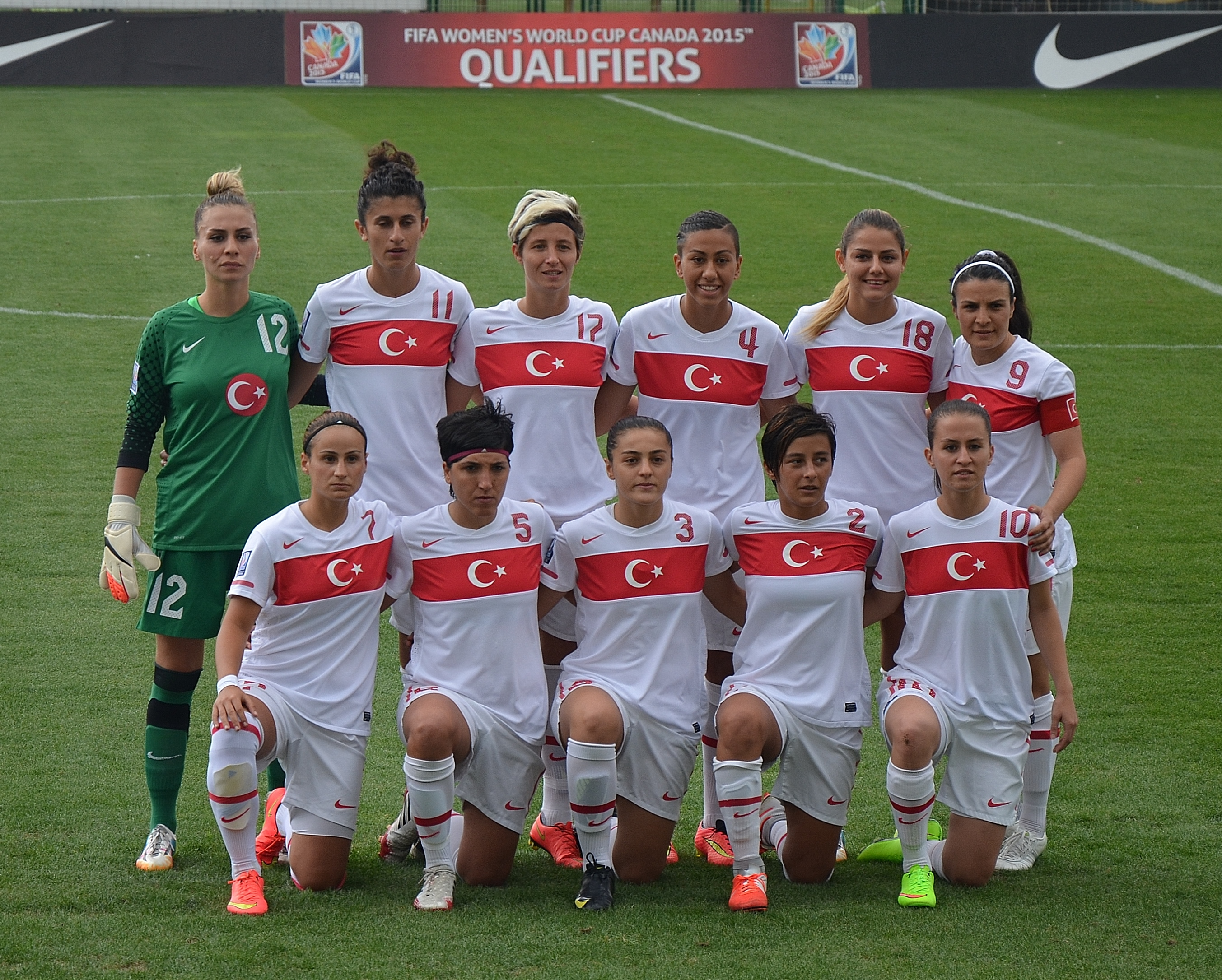
Turkey women's national football team in the home match against Belarus on 17 September 2014: Çağlar (12), Uraz (11), Esra Erol (17), Göksu (4), Elgalp (18), Defterli (9), Karabulut (7), Belci (5), Karagenç (3), Çorlu (2), Kara (10).

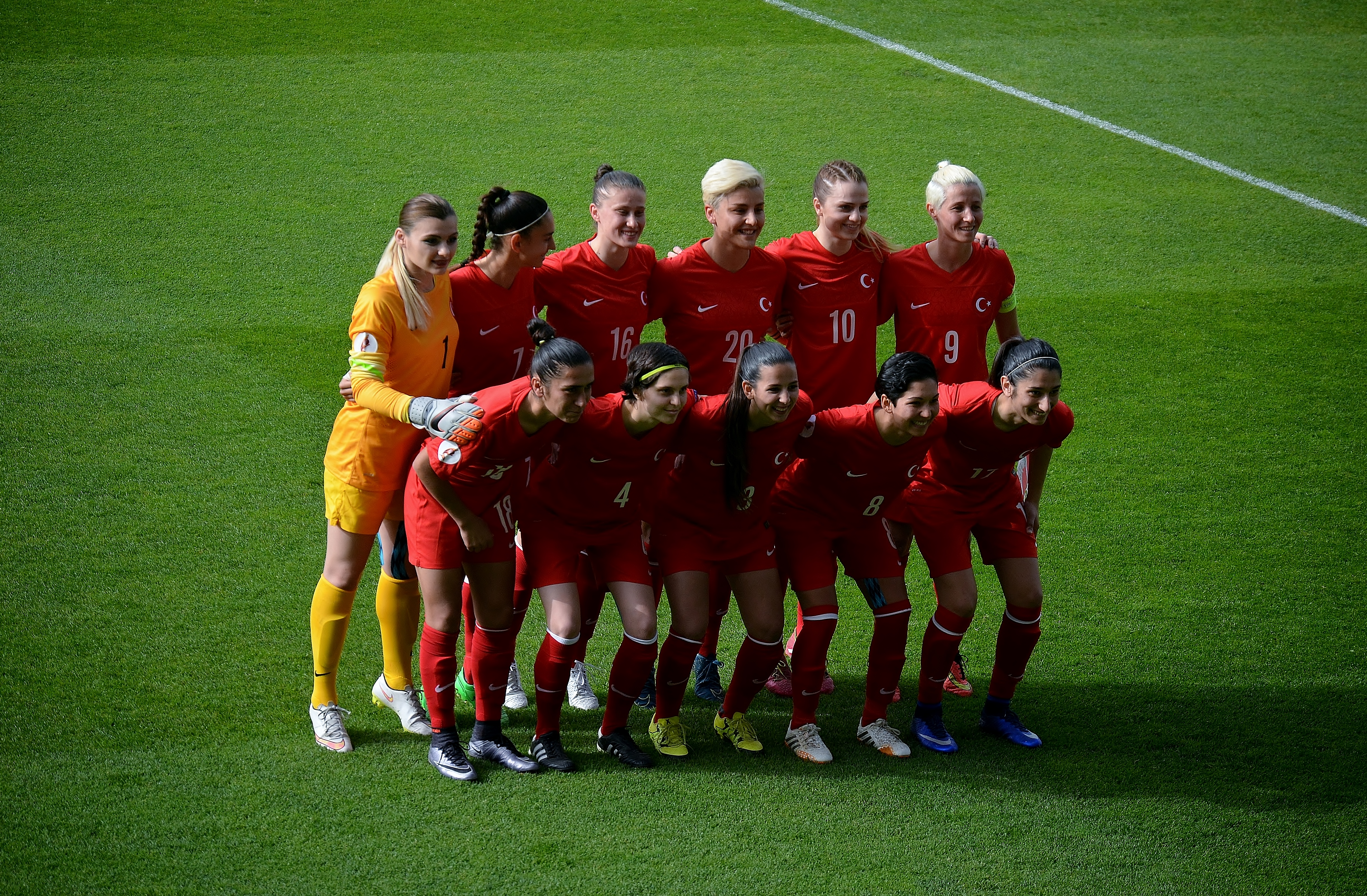
Turkey women's national football team in the home match against Germany on 8 April 2016: Akgöz (1), Nurlu (7), Topçu (16), Yağ (20), Pekel(10), Esra Ero (9), Demir (18), Tezkan (4), Güvenç (3), Korkmaz (8), Kaya (17).

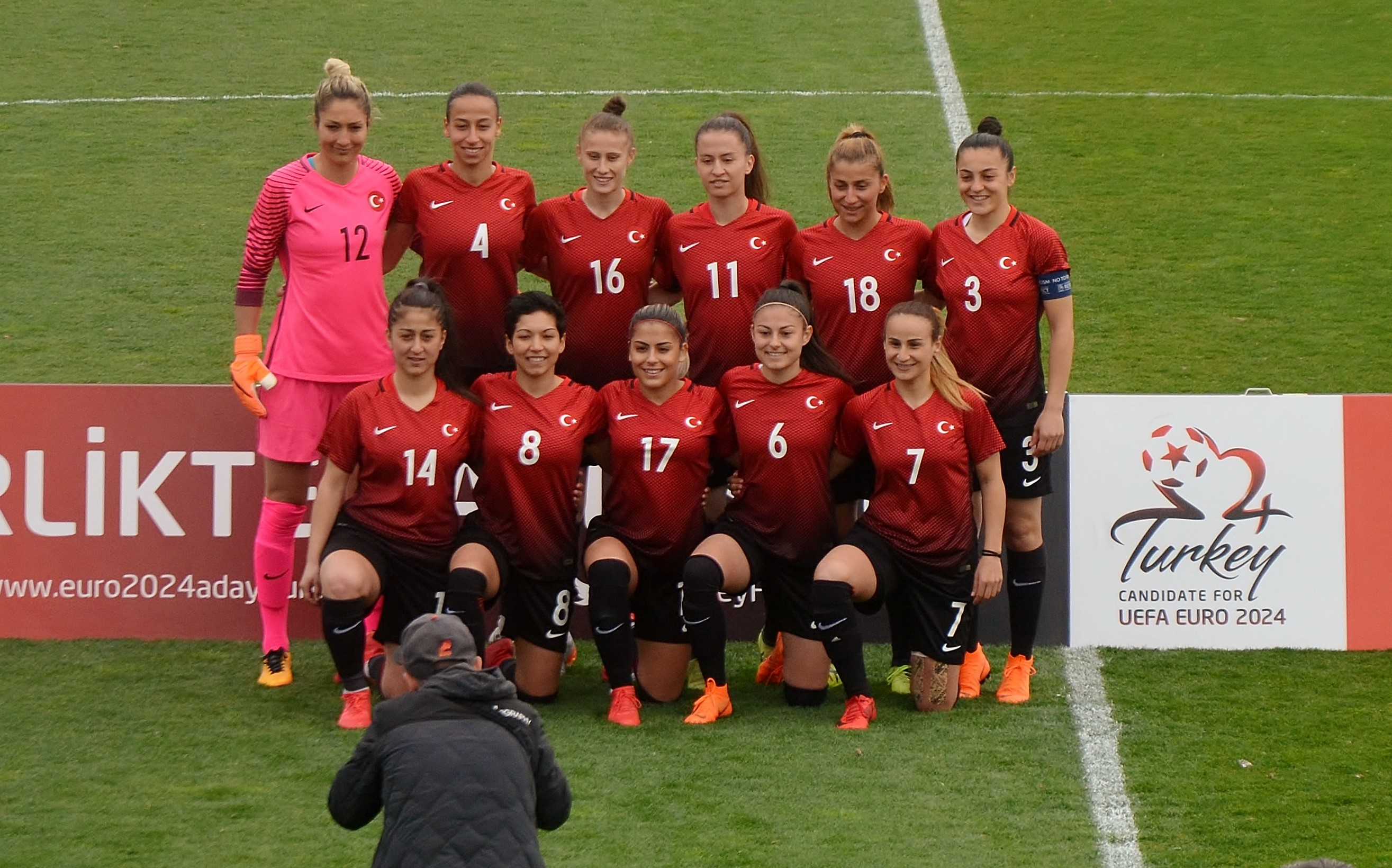
Turkey women's national football team in the home match against Estonia on 7 April 2018: Şahin (12), Alpavut (4), Topçu (16), Kara (11), Işık (18), Karagenç (3), Altunkulak (14), Korkmaz (8), Çınar (17), Cümert (6), Karabuşut (7).

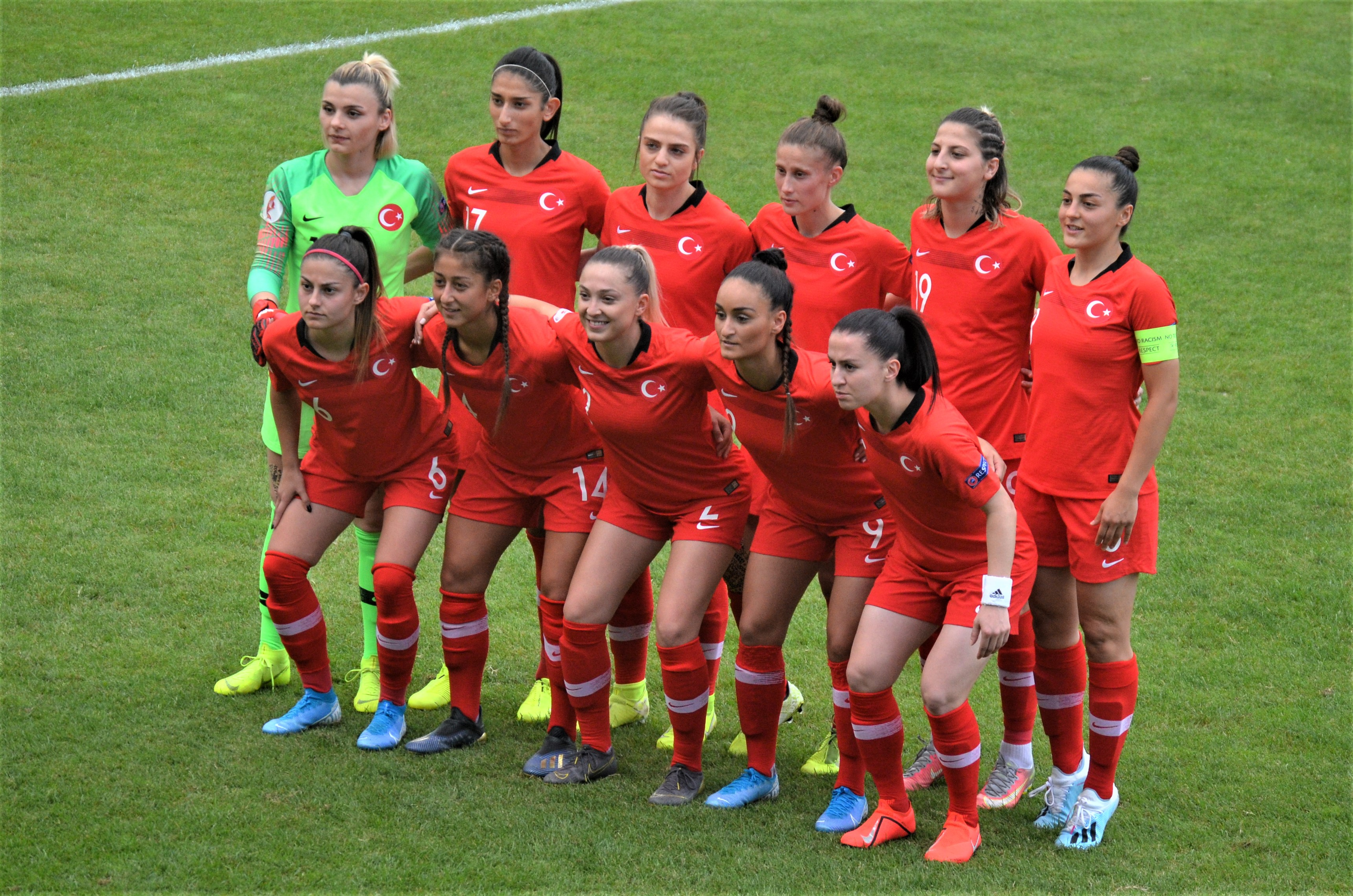
Turkey women's national football team in the home match against Estonia on 4 October 2019: Akgöz (1), Kaya (17), Nurdoğan (7), Pekel (10), Topçu (16), Hançar (19), Karagenç (3), Cümert (6), Altunkulak (14), Yeniçeri (2), Uzungüney (9), Kara (5).

== Records ==
As of 9 June 2026

Players in bold are still active with the national team.

=== Most appearances ===
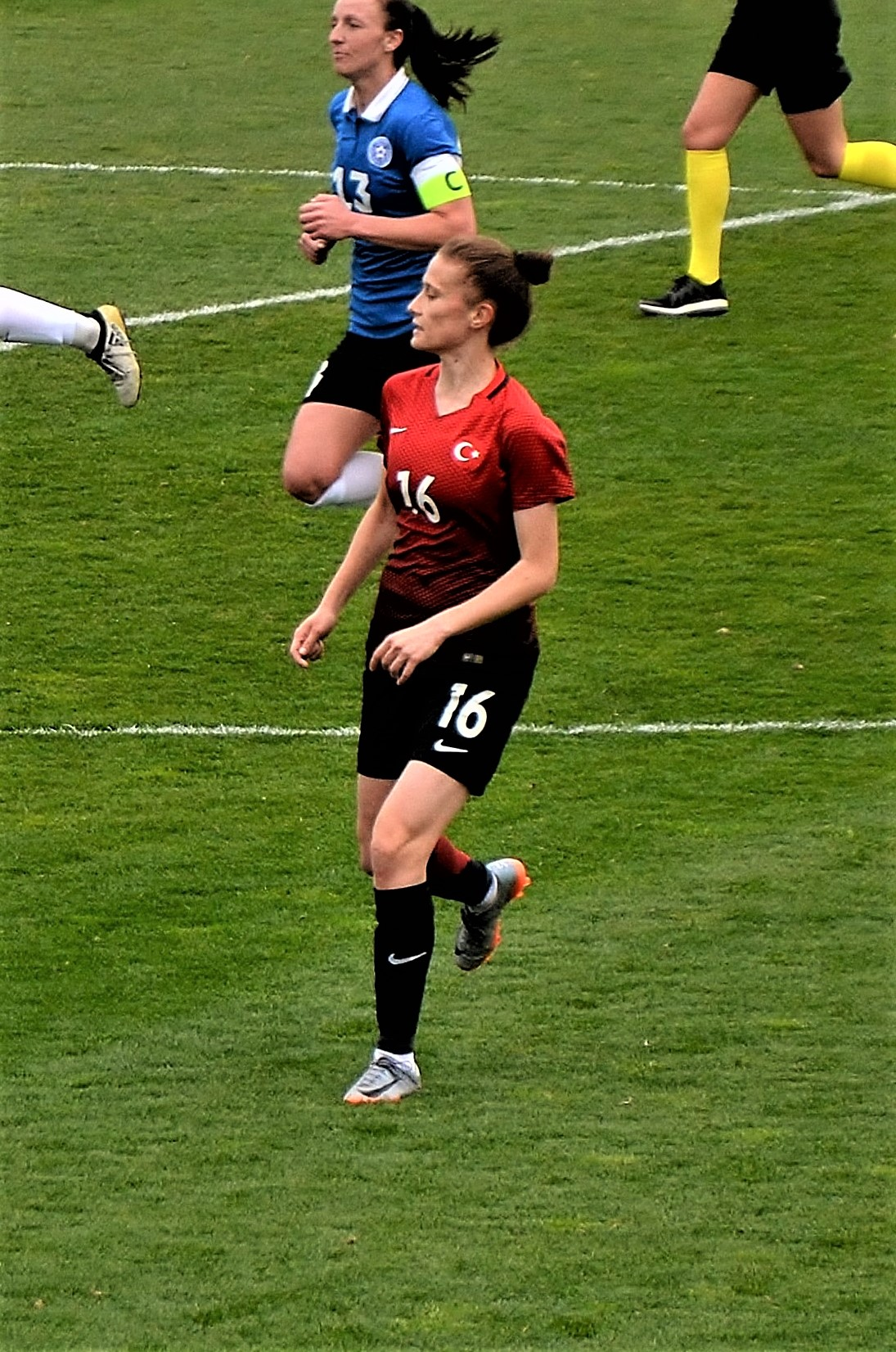
Ebru Topçu

Rank	Player	Career	Caps	Goals
1	**Ebru Topçu**	2013–present	102	27
2	Didem Karagenç	2010–2025	74	3
3	Yağmur Uraz	2006–2024	66	28
4	**Arzu Karabulut**	2011–present	60	7
5	**Ece Türkoğlu**	2016–present	58	12
6	**Gülbin Hız**	2011–present	56	5
7	**Selda Akgöz**	2015–present	55	0
7	Esra Erol	2001–2020	55	8
7	**Busem Şeker**	2017–present	55	8
8	**İlayda Civelek**	2020–present	54	2
9	**Elif Keskin**	2020–present	53	5
10	Bilgin Defterli	1999–2014	52	16

=== Top goalscorers ===
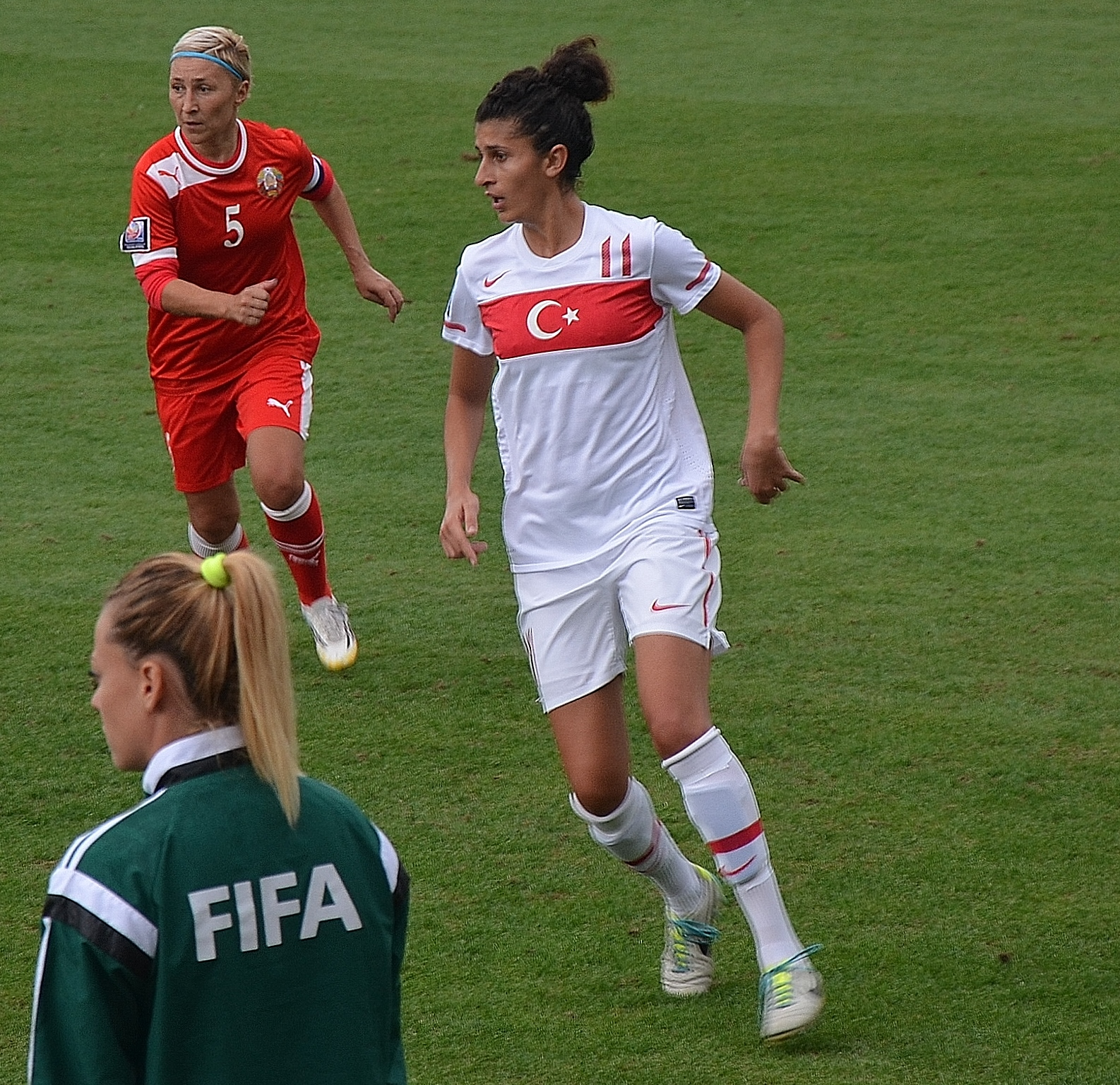
Yağmur Uraz

Rank	Player	Career	Goals	Caps	Avg.
1	Yağmur Uraz	2006–2024	28	66	0.42
2	**Ebru Topçu**	2013–present	27	102	0.26
3	Melahat Eryurt	1995–2002	18	39	0.46
4	Bilgin Defterli	1999–2014	16	52	0.31
5	**Selen Altunkulak**	2017–present	13	22	0.59
6	Seyhan Gündüz	1997–2002	12	30	0.40
6	**Ece Türkoğlu**	2016–present	12	58	0.21
6	**Kader Hançar**	2018–present	12	41	0.29
7	Reyhan Şeker	2006–2012	10	21	0.48
7	**Melike Pekel**	2015–present	10	43	0.23

=== Hat-tricks ===
Player	Club	Against	Goals	Result	Place	Date
Melahat Eryurt	(Turkey) Dinarsuspor	Israel	3	5–2	ISR, Netanya	9 February 1998
Melahat Eryurt	(Turkey) Dinarsuspor	Israel	3	8–0	ISR, Netanya	11 February 1998
Yağmur Uraz	(Turkey) Konak Belediyespor	Georgia	3	6–0	TUR, Trabzon	26 February 2015
Melike Pekel	(France) FC Metz	Luxembourg	3	9–1	FAR, Tórshavn	8 April 2017
Selen Altunkulak	(France) FC Metz	Luxembourg	3	9–1	FAR, Tórshavn	8 April 2017

=== Centuriate goals ===
Rank	Player	Club	Against	Result	Place	Date
1st	Nazan Bulut	(Turkey) Gürtaşspor	Hungary	1–2	TUR, Istanbul	9 May 1996
100th	Bilgin Defterli	(Germany) FFC Brauweiler Pulheim	Macedonia	4–0	GEO, Tbilisi	16 May 2009
200th	Benan Altıntaş	(Turkey) Fomget Gençlik ve Spor	Albania	1–2	ALB, Elbasan	12 July 2021

== Competitive record ==
=== FIFA Women's World Cup ===
FIFA Women's World Cup record									Qualification record							
Year	Result	GP	W	D*	L	GF	GA	GD	Q	GP	W	D*	L	GF	GA	GD
(China) 1991	Did not participate								qual.	Declined participation						
(Sweden) 1995	Did not participate								qual.	Declined participation						
(United States) 1999	Did not qualify								qual.	6	1	2	3	6	15	−9
(United States) 2003	Did not qualify								qual.	8	1	0	7	10	27	−17
(China) 2007	Did not participate								qual.	Declined participation						
(Germany) 2011	Did not qualify								qual.	8	2	1	5	10	23	−13
(Canada) 2015	Did not qualify								qual.	10	4	0	6	12	31	−19
(France) 2019	Did not qualify								qual.	3	2	0	1	13	3	+10
(Australia) (New Zealand) 2023	Did not qualify								qual.	10	3	1	6	9	26	–17
(Brazil) 2027	To be determined								qual.	To be determined						
(Costa Rica) (Jamaica) (Mexico) (United States) 2031	To be determined								qual.	To be determined						
(United Kingdom) 2035	To be determined								qual.	To be determined						
Total	—	–	–	–	–	–	–	–	—	45	13	4	28	60	125	−65

*Draws include knockout matches decided on penalty kicks.

=== Olympic Games ===
Summer Olympics record
Year	Result	GP	W	D*	L	GF	GA	GD
(United States) 1996	Did not qualify							
(Australia) 2000	Did not qualify							
(Greece) 2004	Did not qualify							
(China) 2008	Did not qualify							
(United Kingdom) 2012	Did not qualify							
(Brazil) 2016	Did not qualify							
(Japan) 2020	Did not qualify							
(France) 2024	Unable to qualify							
(United States) 2028	To be determined							
(Australia) 2032	To be determined							
Total	—	–	–	–	–	–	–	–

*Draws include knockout matches decided on penalty kicks.

=== UEFA Women's Championship ===
UEFA Women's Championship record									Qualifying record									
Year	Result	Pld	W	D*	L	GF	GA	GD	Q	Pld	W	D*	L	GF	GA	GD	P/R	Rnk
1984	Did not participate								qual.	Declined participation								
(Norway) 1987	Did not participate								qual.	Declined participation								
(West Germany) 1989	Did not participate								qual.	Declined participation								
(Denmark) 1991	Did not participate								qual.	Declined participation								
(Italy) 1993	Did not participate								qual.	Declined participation								
(Germany) 1995	Did not participate								qual.	Declined participation								
(Norway) (Sweden) 1997	Did not qualify								qual.	6	0	0	6	1	21	−20	–	
(Germany) 2001	Did not qualify								qual.	6	2	1	3	13	20	−7	–	
(England) 2005	Did not participate								qual.	Declined participation								
(Finland) 2009	Did not qualify								qual.	3	2	0	1	11	2	+9	–	
(Sweden) 2013	Did not qualify								qual.	10	0	1	9	4	48	−44	–	
(Netherlands) 2017	Did not qualify								qual.	8	1	1	6	3	24	−21	–	
(England) 2022	Did not qualify								qual.	10	1	2	7	9	28	−19	–	
(Switzerland) 2025	Did not qualify								qual.	8	3	1	4	9	11	−2	(Note: From Euro 2025 onwards a new qualifying format was introduced, linked to the Women's Nations League where teams are divided into leagues with promotion/relegation between the leagues at the end of each cycle.)	24th
Total	—	–	–	–	–	–	–	–	—	43	6	5	32	41	143	–102	24th	

*Draws include knockout matches decided on penalty kicks.

=== UEFA Women's Nations League ===
As of 25 February 2025

UEFA Women's Nations League record
Season	Division	Group	Pos	Pld	W	D	L	GF	GA	P/R	RK
2023–24	C	2	1st	6	6	0	0	16	0	▲	33rd
2025	B	2	(^{1})	8	4	0	4	10	7	Same position	26th
Total				14	10	0	4	26	7	33rd and 26th	

▲	Promoted at end of season
Same position	No movement at end of season
▼	Relegated at end of season
*	Participated in promotion/relegation play-offs
(^{1})	Tournament in progress

== FIFA World Rankings ==
Last update 13 July 2021.

Best Ranking Worst Ranking Best Mover Worst Mover

Turkey's FIFA world rankings
Rank	Year	Games Played	Won	Lost	Drawn	Best		Worst	
Rank	Year	Games Played	Won	Lost	Drawn	Rank	Move	Rank	Move
69	2021	2	2	0	0	69	▲3	72	▼0

== See also ==
- Football in Turkey
- List of Turkey women's international footballers
- Turkey women's national under-17 football team
- Turkey women's national under-19 football team
- Turkey women's national under-21 football team
- Turkey women's national football team (Results)
- Women's football in Turkey
- Turkish Women's Cup
- Turkey national football team
- Turkey national under-21 football team
- Turkey national under-19 football team
- Turkey national under-17 football team
- Turkish football clubs in European competitions
