= Suat Okyar =

Turkish footballer and coach

Personal information
- Date of birth: March 30, 1972 (age 54)
- Place of birth: Istanbul, Turkey

Senior career*
Years	Team	Apps	(Gls)
1993–1994	Bakırköyspor		
1994–1995	Çengelköyspor		
1995	Bakırköyspor		
1995–1996	Pendikspor		
1998–2000	Vefa S.K.		
2000	Ümraniyespor		

Managerial career
- 2014–: Turkey women's, Turkey futsal
- * Club domestic league appearances and goals

Suat Okyar (born March 30, 1972) is a Turkish football coach and former footballer. Currently, he is the assistant coach of the Turkey national futsal team, and the head coach of the Turkey women's national football team.

Okyar is the son of Vedat Okyar (1945–2009), former Beşiktaş J.K. footballer and captain as well as sports journalist.
