= Ali Alanç =

Turkish football manager

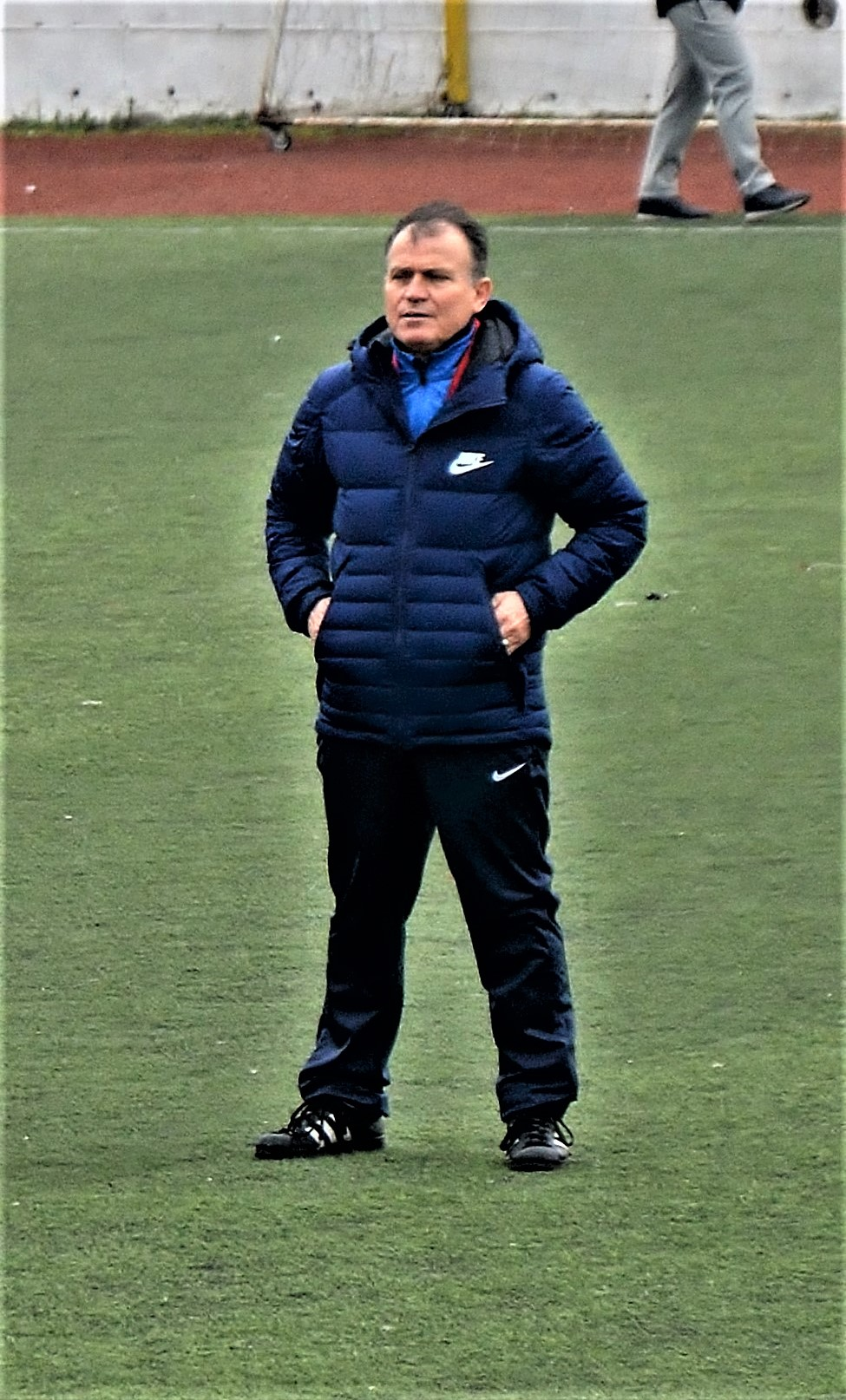
- Ali Alanç coaching Konak Belediyespor in 2018

Personal information
- Date of birth: January 22, 1959 (age 67)
- Place of birth: İzmir, Turkey

Team information
- Current team: Bornova Hitab Spor

Managerial career
- Years: Team
- 2007–2023: Konak Belediyespor
- 2023–: Bornova Hitab Spor

Ali Alanç (born January 22, 1959) is a Turkish football manager. He has been the head coach of the İzmir-based Bornova Hitab Spor since the 2023–24 season, which competes in the Super League.

Alanç serves also as the president of the Confederation of the Turkish Amateur Sports Clubs (ASKF), and a member of the Turkish Football Federation's executive board.

Alanç has been with Konak Belediyespor since 2007 managing the amateur football team. After taking over the leadership of the women's team from Hüseyin Tavur, who coached the team since the 2006–07 season and won three championships in a row, Alanç managed the team in three matches of the 2015–16 UEFA Women's Champions League qualifying round. His team won the champion title of the 2015–16 season for the fourth time. He coached Konak Belediyespor at the 2016–17 UEFA Women's Champions League Group 9 matches.

In the 2023-24 season, he was appointed head coach of the İzmir-based women's club Bornava Hitab Spor. After the end of the season, he led the team promoted to the Super League.

== Managerial statistics ==
As of 22 December 2024

Team	From	To	Record				
Team	From	To	G	W	D	L	Win %
Konak Belediyespor
Konak Belediyespor	2015	2016	21	17	0	4	80.95
Konak Belediyespor	2016	2017	29	21	2	6	72.41
Konak Belediyespor	2017	2018	22	15	3	4	68.18
Konak Belediyespor	2018	2019	18	12	3	3	66.67
Konak Belediyespor	2019	2020	16	12	1	3	75.00
Konak Belediyespor	2020	2021	4	2	1	1	50.00
Konak Belediyespor	2021	2022	24	12	7	5	50.00
Konak Belediyespor	2022	2023	18	6	2	10	33.33
Bornova Hitab Spor
Bornova Hitab Spor	2023	2024	24	19	4	1	79.17
Bornova Hitab Spor	2024	2025	13	2	4	7	15.38
Total			189	118	27	44	62.43

== Honour s ==
Turkish Women's First Football League

Konak Belediyespor
Winners (2): 2015–16, 2016–17
Third places (3): 2017–18, 2018–19, 2019–20

Bornova Hitab Spor
Runners-up (1) 2023–24
