= Nino Sutidze =

Georgian footballer

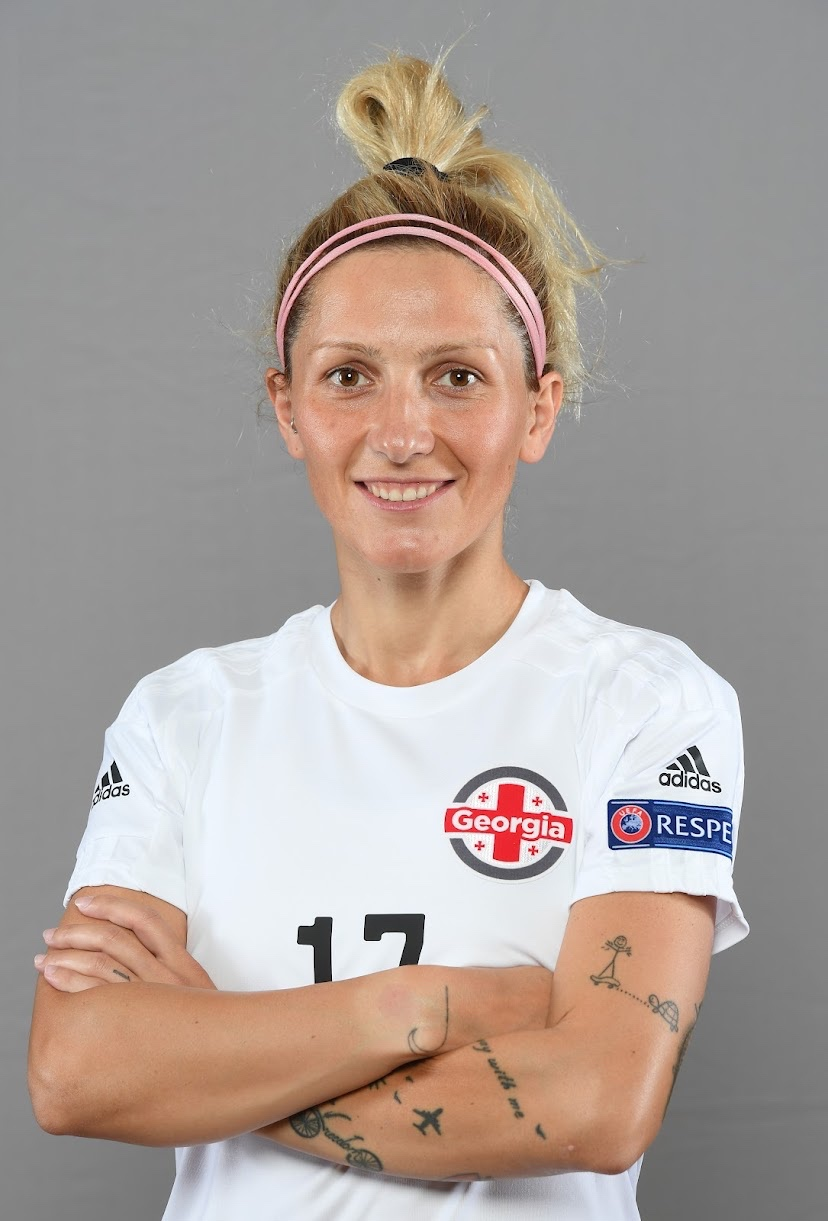
Nino Sutidze

Nino Sutidze (Georgian: ნინო სუთიძე, born 27 March 1992) is a Georgian women's footballer who plays as a defender. She played in the Turkish Women's First Football League for Ataşehir Belediyespor. She is a member of the Georgia women's national football team since 2011.

== Playing career ==
=== Club ===
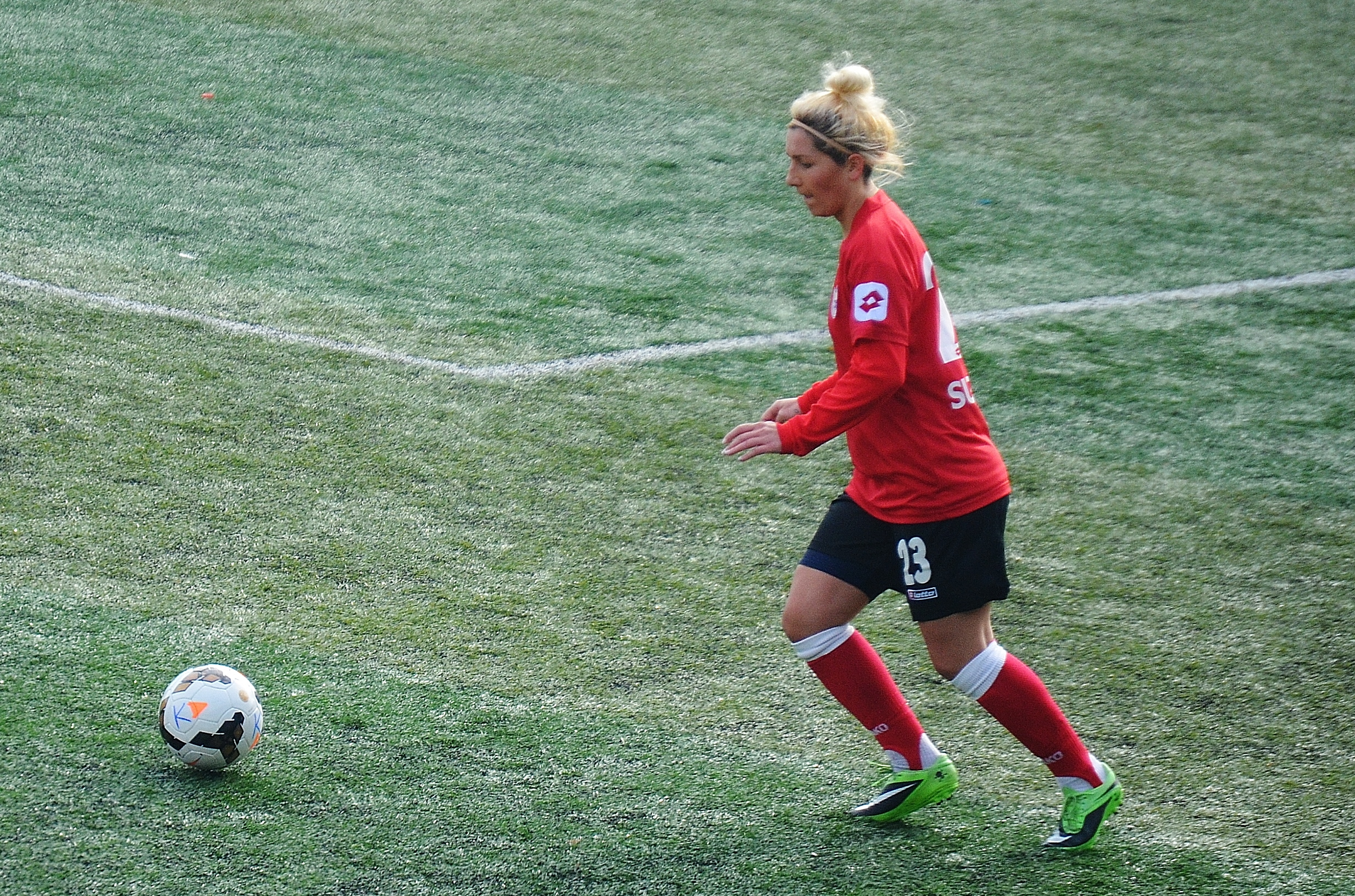
Nino Sutidze playing for Konak Belediyespor in the 2015–16 season

Nino Sutidze began her football career with FC Iveria Khashuri in Khashuri, Georgia. In the summer of 2008, she transferred to the senior team of FC Norchi Dinamo Tbilisi. In her first season, she won Georgia women's football championship 2008–09, and took part at the 2009–10 UEFA Women's Champions League – Group A matches. She played in all the three group matches until her team's elimination. After two seasons, Sutidze moved to FC Baia Zugdidi, and enjoyed in the 2009–10 season her second championship.

On 2 December 2011 she was transferred by the Turkish club Konak Belediyespor. With the team from İzmir, she enjoyed Turkish Women's First Football League championship in 2013. She participated at the 2013–14 UEFA Women's Champions League and played in four matches of the seven until the quarterfinals.

In the beginning of the 2013–14 season's second half, Konak Belediyespor suspended her license in order to be able to deploy her newly transferred countrywoman Tatiana Matveeva in addition to their two other foreign players, the Romanians Cosmina Dușa and Raluca Sârghe. Women's football teams in Turkey may have not more than three foreigners in their squad.

In the 2014–15 season, she transferred to Adana İdmanyurduspor playing the half season only. In the second half of the 2014–15 season, she moved to Karşıyaka BESEM Spor in İzmir. In the beginning of the 2015–16 season, Sutidze returned her former club Konak Belediyespor. She joined the Istanbul-based Ataşehir Belediyespor in the 2016–18 season. She transferred to the Georgian club WFC NIKE in the 2019 season. After 2019 season she joined Georgian Club FC Kvartali where she played for 2 seasons.

=== International ===
Nino Sutidze made her debut in the Georgian women's national team on 3 March 2011, playing at the UEFA Women's Euro 2013 qualifying round match against Malta.

== Post-playing career ==
Nino Sutidze became analyst at Georgian women's national team in the 2022.

== Career statistics ==
As of April 18, 2018.

Club	Season	League			Continental		National		Total	
Club	Season	Division	Apps	Goals	Apps	Goals	Apps	Goals	Apps	Goals
FC Norchi Dinamo Tbilisi	2008–10				3	0			3	0
FC Norchi Dinamo Tbilisi	Total				3	0			3	0
FC Baia Zugdidi	2010–11				3	0			3	0
FC Baia Zugdidi	Total				3	0			3	0
Konak Belediyespor	2011–12	First League	16	0	–	–			16	0
Konak Belediyespor	2012–13	First League	5	0	–	–			5	0
Konak Belediyespor	2013–14	First League	2	0	4	0			6	0
Konak Belediyespor	Total		23	0	4	0			27	0
Adana İdmanyurduspor	2014–15	First League	9	0	–	–			9	0
Adana İdmanyurduspor	Total		9	0	–	–			9	0
Karşıyaka BESEM Spor	2014–15	First League	8	0	2	3	0	11	0	
Karşıyaka BESEM Spor	Total		8	0	–	–	3	0	11	0
Konak Belediyespor	2015–16	First League	8	0	–	–	7	0	15	0
Konak Belediyespor	Total		8	0	–	–	7	0	15	0
Ataşehir Belediyespor	2016–17	First League	21	0	–	–	4	0	25	0
Ataşehir Belediyespor	2017–18	First League	11	1	1	0	0	11	1	
Ataşehir Belediyespor	Total		32	1	–	–	4	0	36	1
Career total			80	1	10	0	14		104	

== Honours ==
Georgian women's player of the year in 2017 and 2021

Georgia women's football championship

FC Norchi Dinamo Tbilisi
Winners (1): 2008–09.

FC Baia Zugdidi
Winners (1): 2009–10.

Turkish Women's First League

Konak Belediyespor
Winners (3): 2012–13, 2013–14, 2015–16

Ataşehir Belediyespor
Winners (1): 2017–18
Third places (1): 2016–17
