= Esra Erol (footballer) =

Turkish footballer (born 1985)

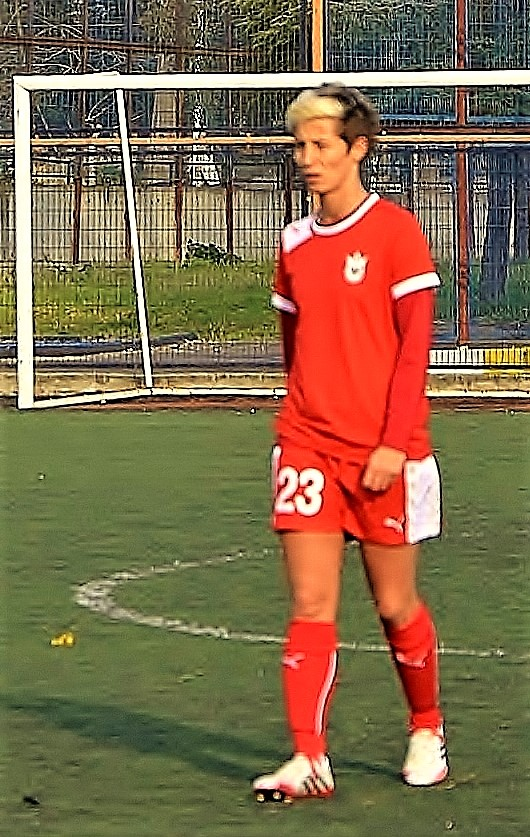
- Esra Erol (January 2014)

Personal information
- Full name: Esra Erol
- Date of birth: 6 November 1985 (age 40)
- Place of birth: Bakırköy, Turkey
- Position: Defender

Senior career*
Years	Team	Apps	(Gls)
1999–2001	Dostlukspor		
2001–2003	Zeytinburnuspor	10	(8)
2003–2006	Hatay Sanayispor		
2006–2007	Dostlukspor		
2007–2009	Sakarya Yenikent Güneşspor	18	(8)
2009–2012	Lüleburgaz 39	56	(73)
2012–2015	Konak	51	(7)
2015–2016	Kireçburnu	18	(12)
2016–2018	Konak	40	(9)
2018	Ataşehir	0	(0)
2018–2023	Beşiktaş	70	(19)
2023–2024	Fatih Karagümrük	20	(0)
2024	Bornova Hitab	11	(1)
2025–	Avcilar Cihangir	6	(2)

International career^{‡}
2001–2003	Turkey U-19	19	(3)
2001–2020	Turkey	55	(8)
- * Club domestic league appearances and goals as of 11 May 2025 ‡ National team caps and goals as of 30 November 2021

Esra Erol (born 6 November 1985) is a Turkish women's footballer who plays as a defender in the Turkish Women's Football Super League for Bornova Hitab in İzmir. She was a member of the Turkish national team.

== Club career ==
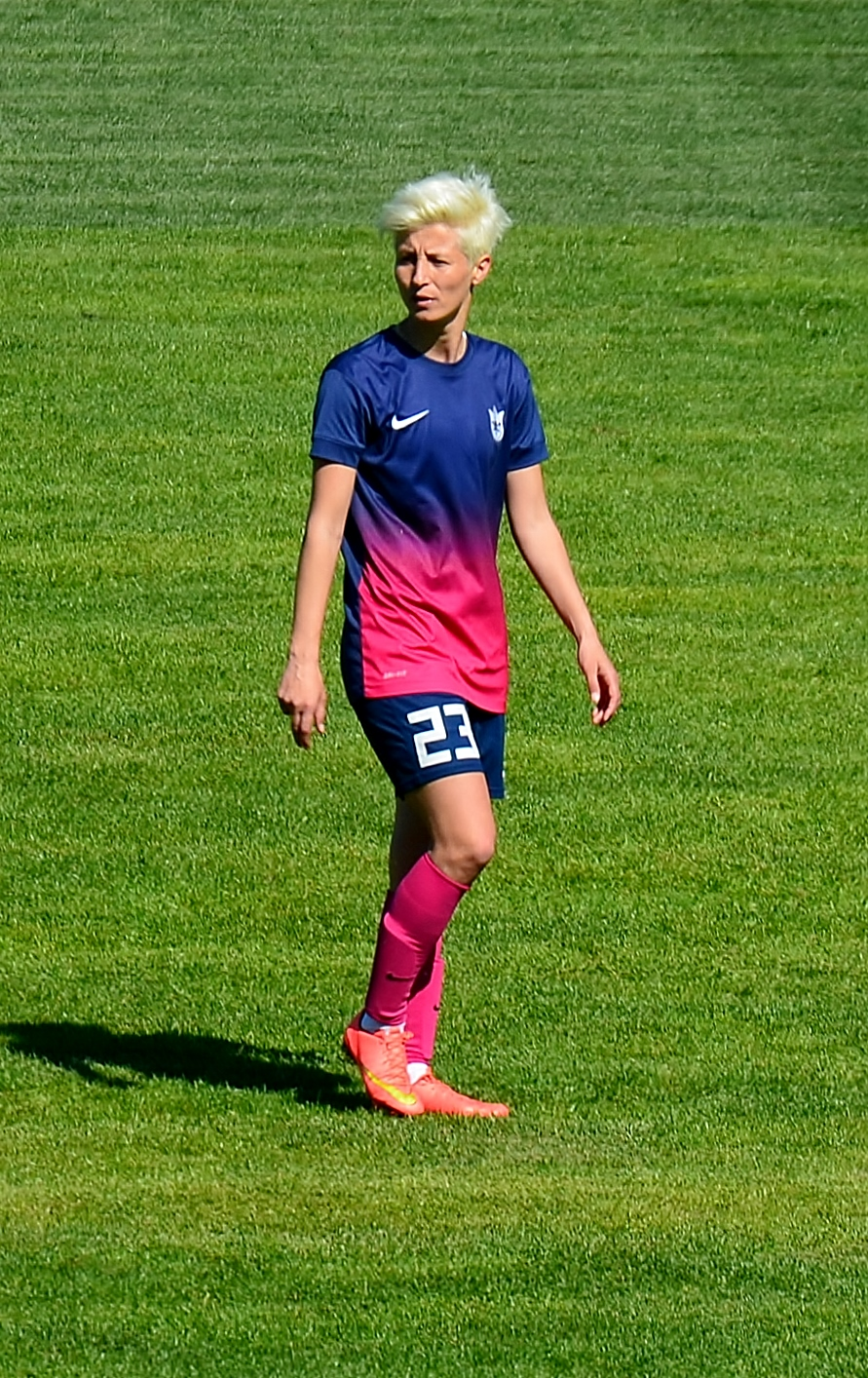
Esra Erol playing for Konak Belediyespor in the 2014–15 season.

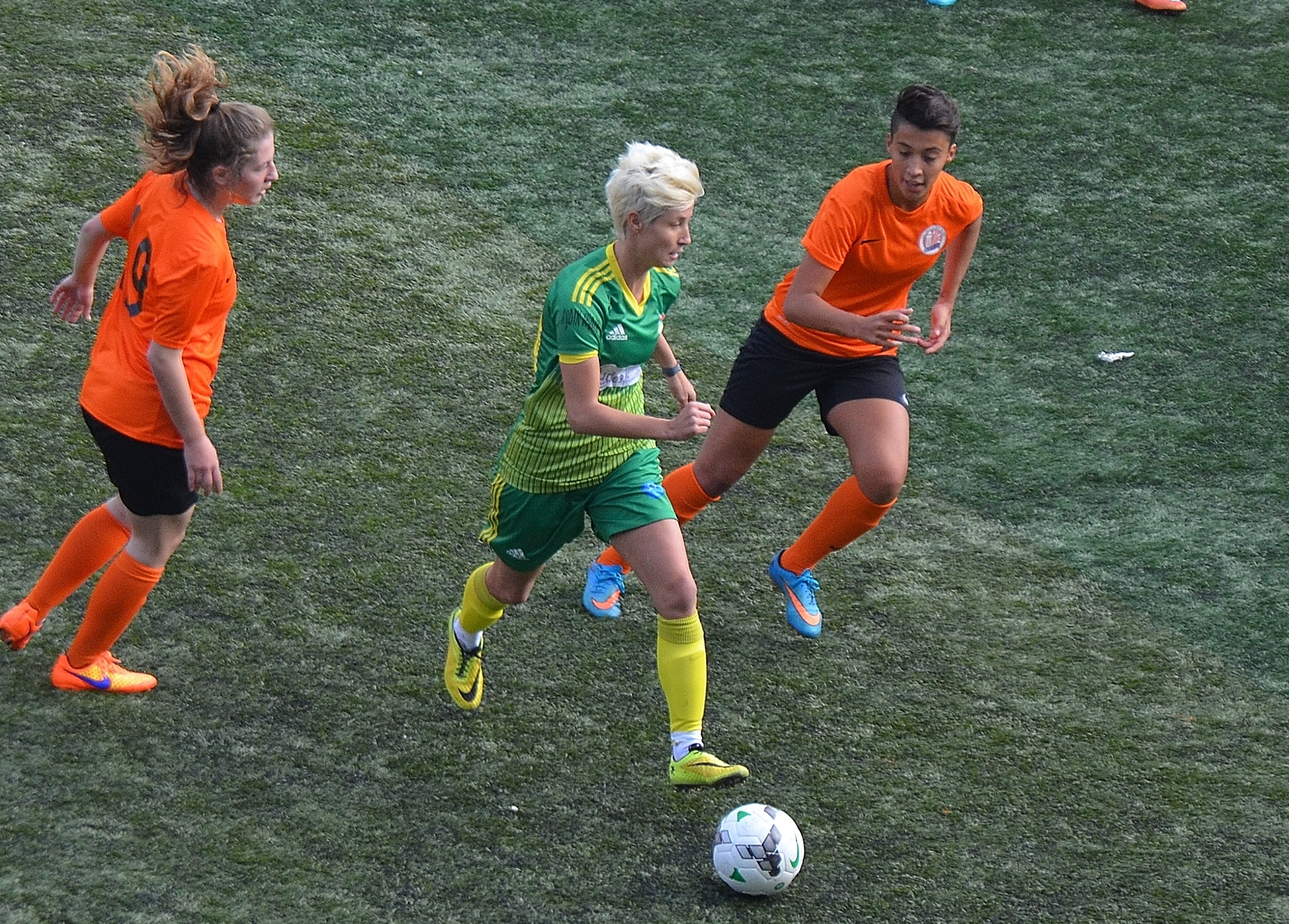
Esra Erol (green/yellow) playing for Kireçburnu Spor in the 2015–16 season's home match against 1207 Antalya Muratpaşa Belediye Spor.

Following a successful season in the Sakarya based Yenikent Güneşspor, the club extended Esra Erol's contract for one more season in July 2008, and tasked her with captain position. She captained Lüleburgaz Düvenciler Lisesispor and after its renaming Lüleburgaz 39 Spor. In August 2012, she transferred from Lüleburgaz 39 Spor, where she was also the team captain, to Konak Belediyespor.

She played with Konak Belediyespor at the 2013–14 UEFA Women's Champions League in the qualification round matches in August 2013 and in the knockout stage matches in October 2013.

For the 2015–16 season, she signed with Kireçburnu Spor, which was recently promoted to the Women's First League.

In August 2016, she returned to her former club Konak Belediyespor, and played in three matches of the Group 9 of the 2016–17 UEFA Women's Champions League qualifying round, where she netted one goal. She capped in three games of the 2017–18 UEFA Women's Champions League qualifying round and scored one goal.

Erol returned to Istanbul and signed with Ataşehir Belediyespor before the 2017–18 league champion club's participation at the 2018–19 UEFA Women's Champions League qualifying round. She played in all three matches of the qualification round.

In the 2018–19 league season, she transferred to Beşiktaş J.K. She enjoyed the champion title of her team in the 2018–19 season. She took part at the 2019–20 UEFA Women's Champions League – Group 9 matches.

She transferred to Fatih Karagümrük in Istanbul in the 2023-24 Super League season. The next season, she moved to İzmir again, and joined Bornova Hitab. After the first half of the 2024-25 Super League season, she transferred to the Third League club Avcılar Cihangir in Istanbul.

== International career ==
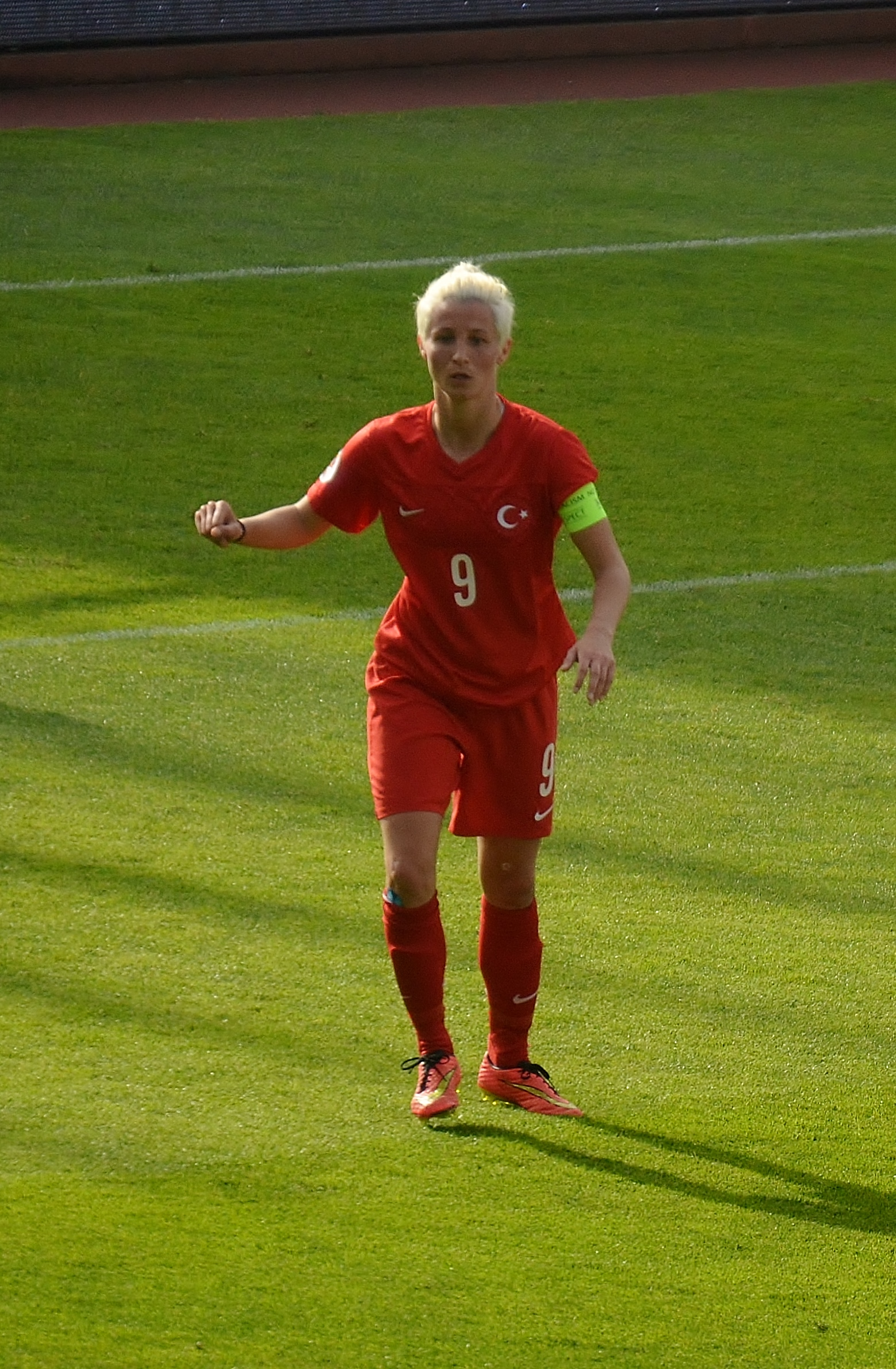
Esra Erol playing as captain for Turkey women's national at the UEFA Women's Euro 2017 qualifying Group 5 match against Germany in Istanbul, Turkey

Erol scored a winner over Northern Ireland in the Euro 2009 qualifying. She is also the owner of four goals scored in friendly matches against Bulgarian, Russian and Greek national women.

She played at the UEFA Women's Euro 2017 qualifying Group 5 matches as the captain of the Turkey women's national.

International goals
Date	Venue	Opponent	Result	Competition	Scored
27 August 2001	TFF Riva Facility Istanbul, Turkey	Bulgaria	1–2	Friendly	1
8 August 2003	TFF Riva Facility Istanbul, Turkey	Russia	1–7	Friendly	1
18 November 2006	Tevfik Sırrı Gür Stadium Mersin, Turkey	Northern Ireland	1–0	UEFA Women's Euro 2009 qualifying	1
27 April 2011	Atatürk Stadium Bolu, Turkey	Greece	1–1	Friendly	1
29 April 2011	Atatürk Stadium Bolu, Turkey	Greece	4–1	Friendly	1
24 February 2015	Atatürk Stadium Rize, Turkey	Georgia	4–2	Friendly	1

== Career statistics ==
As of match played 11 May 2025.

Club	Season	League			Continental		National		Total	
Club	Season	Division	Apps	Goals	Apps	Goals	Apps	Goals	Apps	Goals
Zeytinburnuspor	2001–2003	First League	10	8	–	–	16	1	26	9
Hatay Sanayispor	2003–2006	Second League			–	–	5	1	5	1
Dostlukspor			–	–	7	2	7	2		
Sakarya Yenikent Güneşspor	2008–09	First League	18	8	–	–	3	2	21	10
Lüleburgaz 39	2009–10	Second League	17	42	–	–	3	0	20	42
Lüleburgaz 39	2010–11	First League	21	21	–	–	3	2	24	23
Lüleburgaz 39	2011–12	First League	18	10	–	–	10	0	28	10
Lüleburgaz 39	Total		56	73	–	–	16	2	72	75
Konak	2012–13	First League	18	2			2	0	20	2
Konak	2013–14	First League	16	0	5	0	9	0	30	0
Konak	2014–15	First League	17	5	–	–	4	1	20	6
Konak	Total		51	7	5	0	15	1	71	8
Kireçburnu	2015–16	First League	18	12	–	–	10	0	28	12
Konak	2016–17	First League	24	5	3	1	0	0	27	6
Konak	2017–18	First League	16	4	3	1	0	0	19	5
Konak	Total		40	9	6	2	0	0	46	11
Ataşehir	2018–19	First League	0	0	3	0	0	0	3	0
Beşiktaş	2018–19	First League	17	6	-	-	0	0	17	6
Beşiktaş	2019–20	First League	15	4	3	0	1	0	19	4
Beşiktaş	2020–21	First League	6	3	0	0	1	0	7	3
Beşiktaş	2021–22	Super League	15	3	0	0	0	0	15	3
Beşiktaş	2022–23	Super League	17	3	0	0	0	0	17	3
Beşiktaş	Total		70	19	3	0	2	0	75	19
Fatih Karagümrük	2023–24	Super League	20	0	-	-	0	0	20	0
Bornova Hitab	2024–25	Super League	11	1	-	-	0	0	11	1
Avcılar Cihamgir	2024–25	Third League	6	2	-	-	0	0	6	2
Career total			280	139	17	2	74	9	371	150

== Honours ==
Turkish Women's First League

Konak Belediyespor
Winners (4): 2012–13, 2013–14, 2014–15, 2016–17
Third places (1): 2017–18

Beşiktaş J.K.
Winners (2): 2018–19, 2020–21
