= Sevgi Çınar =

Turkish footballer (born 1994)

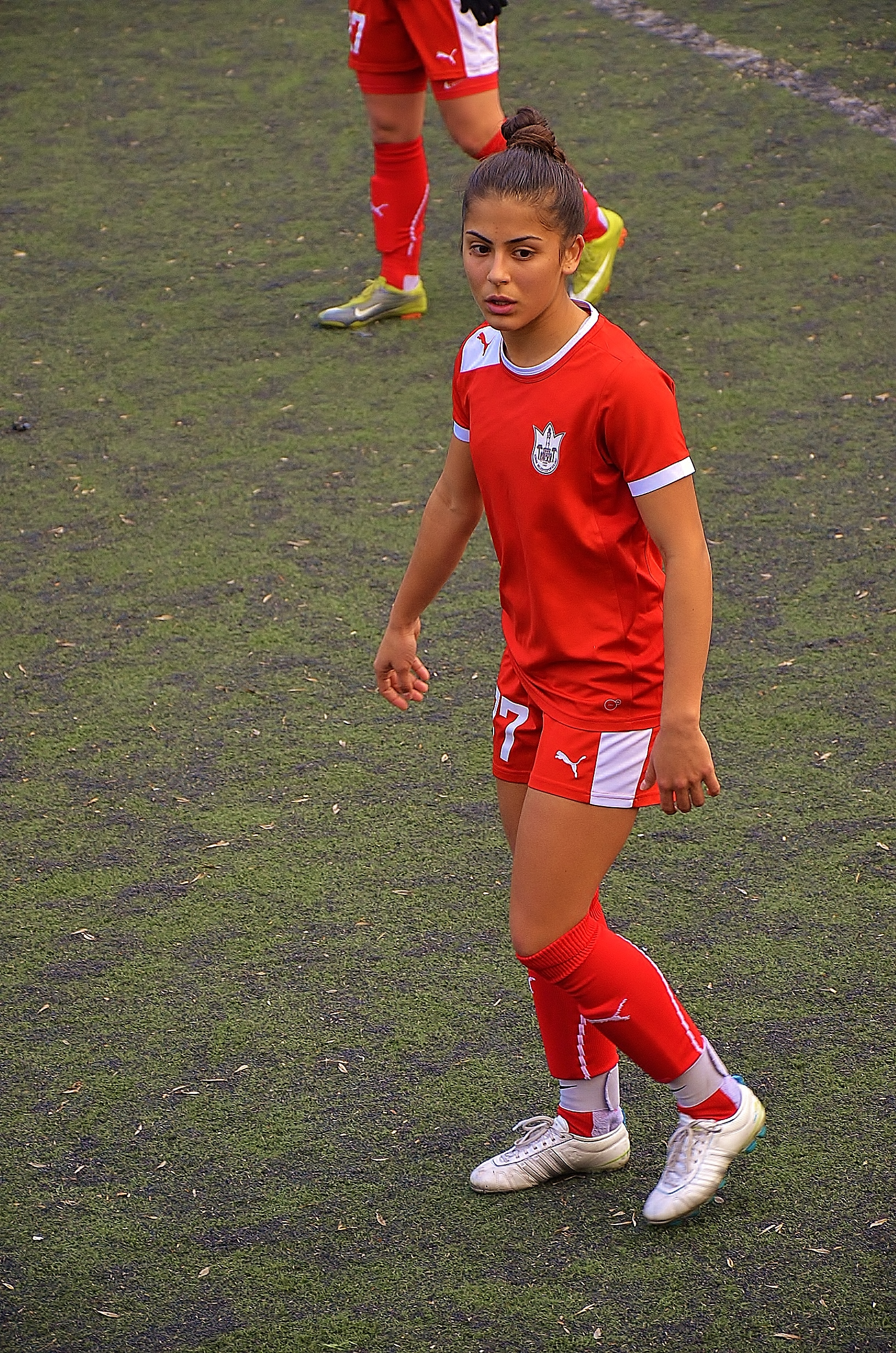
- Sevgi Çınar for Konak Belediyespor in 2014

Personal information
- Full name: Sevgi Çınar
- Date of birth: 15 January 1994 (age 32)
- Place of birth: Seyhan, Adana, Turkey
- Position: Midfielder

Team information
- Current team: Beylerbeyi
- Number: 77

Senior career*
Years	Team	Apps	(Gls)
2008–2011	Adana İdmanyurduspor	51	(55)
2012–2017	Konak	79	(56)
2017–2018	Ataşehir BelediyesporAtaşehir	17	(9)
2018–2019	ALG	15	(12)
2019–2023	Beşiktaş	27	(8)
2023–	Beylerbeyi	31	(6)

International career^{‡}
2009–2010	Turkey U-17	16	(18)
2010–2012	Turkey U-19	25	(7)
2013–2020	Turkey	27	(3)
- * Club domestic league appearances and goals as of 22 September 2024 ‡ National team caps and goals as of 27 October 2020

Sevgi Çınar (born 15 January 1994) is a Turkish women's football midfielder who plays for Beylerbeyi in the Turkish Super League. She was part of the Turkey women's U-19 national football team before she entered the Turkey women's national team. She studied physical education and sports at the Dokuz Eylül University in İzmir.

== Early life ==
Çınar was born on 15 January 1994 in Seyhan district of Adana Province to Murat Çınar, who played football in Adana Demirspor. She became interested in football as she accompanied her father to futsal games. At the age of 13, she was discovered by Tevfik Işık, coach of Adana İdmanyurduspor, while she was playing football in the school. In the beginning, her father complied with Sevgi's devotion to football, but her mother objected. She was persuaded by coach Işık. Following her achievements, the parents supported her more and more.

== Club career ==
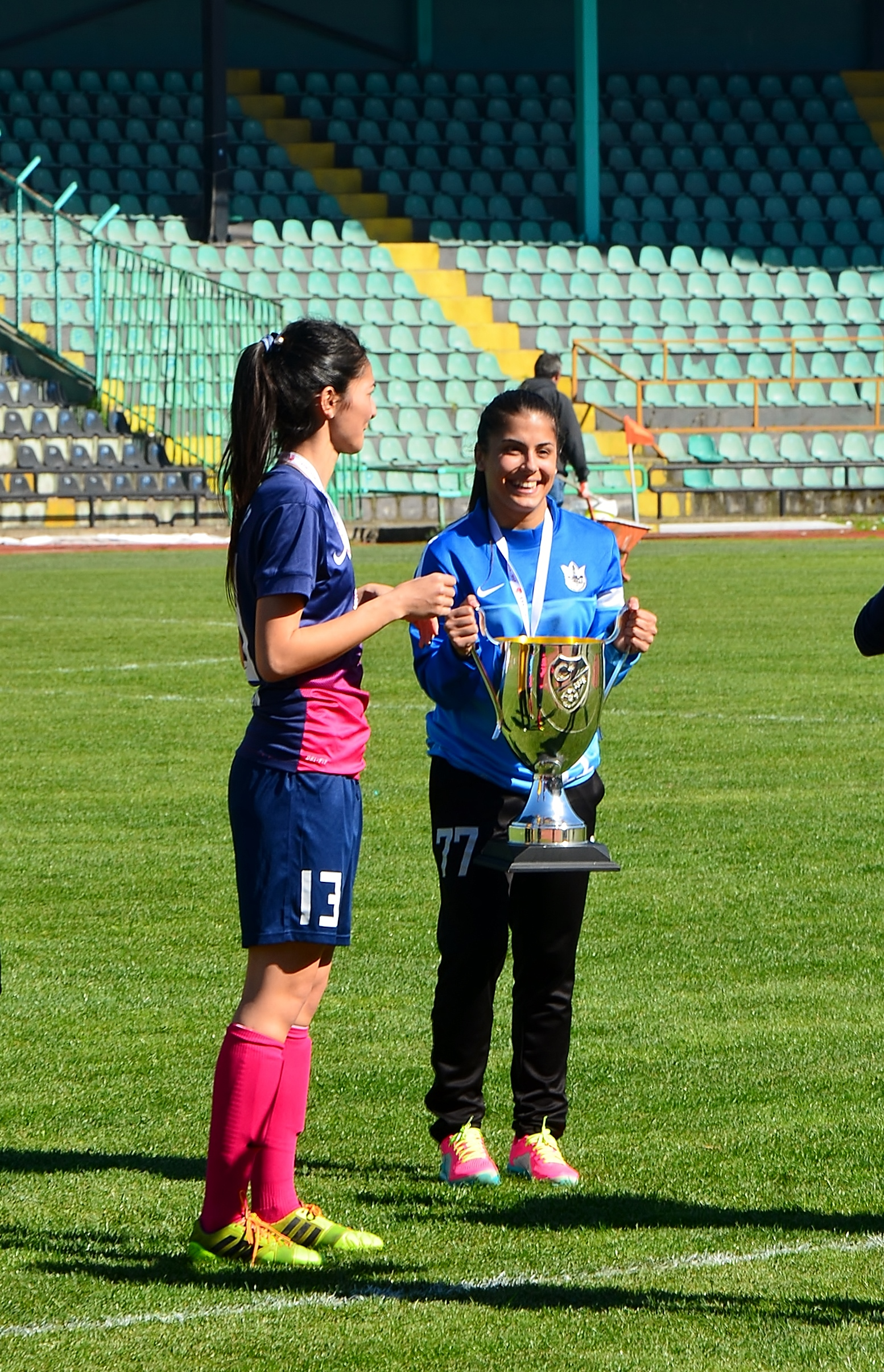
Sevgi Çınar (right) holding the champion trophy of the 2014–15 season after the playoff-match Konak Belediyespor vs Ataşehir Belediyespor.

In January 2012, Çınar left Adana İdmanyurduspor, where she began her football career, and accepted an offer of Konak Belediyespor. She joined the team in İzmir, and appeared in her new team's play-off matches already in the 2012–13 season of Women's First League. She played in three matches of the 2015–16 UEFA Women's Champions League qualifying round, and scored one goal.

At the end of the 2015–16 season, she enjoyed her team's champion title. She played in three matches of the Group 9 of the 2016–17 UEFA Women's Champions League qualifying round. Following the play-off round, the 2016–17 season ended for her team as the champion fifth time in a row, and she became "top scorer" for the second time.

By October 2017, she transferred to the Istanbul-based club Ataşehir Belediyespor.

Çınar took part at the 2018–19 UEFA Women's Champions League qualifying round. She played in all three matches of the qualification round, and scored one goal.

In October 2018, she joined the recently to the Women's First League promoted club ALG Spor in Gaziantep.

She was transferred by the 2018–19 Women's First League champion Beşiktaş J.K. to play in the 2019–20 UEFA Women's Champions League – Group 9 matches. She scored one goal against the Armenian Alashkert. She could not play in the entire 2020-21 Turkcell Women's Football League season due to a cruciate ligament rupture on her left leg, she contracted during a national team camp before the beginning of the regular league season. She underwent a surgery late January 2021. Recovering from her injury, she appeared in a friendly match before the beginning of the 2021–22 Super League season. In December 2021, before the beginning of the 2021–22 Women's Super League, she underwent a surgery on her left knee due to the repeated anterior cruciate ligament injury.

End August 2023, she transferred to Beylerbeyi, which play for the first time in the Super League

International goals
Date	Venue	Opponent	Competition	Result	Scored
Konak Belediyespor
August 8, 2013	Asim Ferhatović Hase Stadium Sarajevo, Bosnia and Herzegovina	(Bulgaria) NSA Sofia	2013–14 UEFA Women's Champions League	W 2–0	1
October 10, 2013	İzmir Alsancak Stadium İzmir, Turkey	(Poland) Unia Racibórz	2013–14 UEFA Women's Champions League	W 2–1	1
August 13, 2015	Otoka Sarajevo, Bosnia and Herzegovina	(Albania) KF Vllaznia Shkodër	2015–16 UEFA Women's Champions League qualifying round	W 5–1	1
August 23, 2016	Sportpark Vondersweijde, Oldenzaal, Netherlands	(Malta) Hibernians F.C.	2016–17 UEFA Women's Champions League qualifying round	W 5–0	1
August 22, 2017	Mikheil Meskhi Stadium Tbilisi, Georgia	(Georgia (country)) WFC Martve	2017–18 UEFA Women's Champions League qualifying round	W 5–0	2
August 25, 2017	David Petriashvili Stadium Tbilisi, Georgia	(Slovakia) Partizán Bardejov	2017–18 UEFA Women's Champions League qualifying round	W 5–1	1
August 13, 2018	III. Kerületi TVE Stadion, Budapest, Hungary	(Kosovo) KFF Mitrovica	2018–19 UEFA Women's Champions League	W 6–1	1
Beşiktaş J.K.
August 13, 2019	Sportpark Heeckeren, Enschede, Netherlands	(Armenia) Alashkert	W 3–0	1	

== International career ==
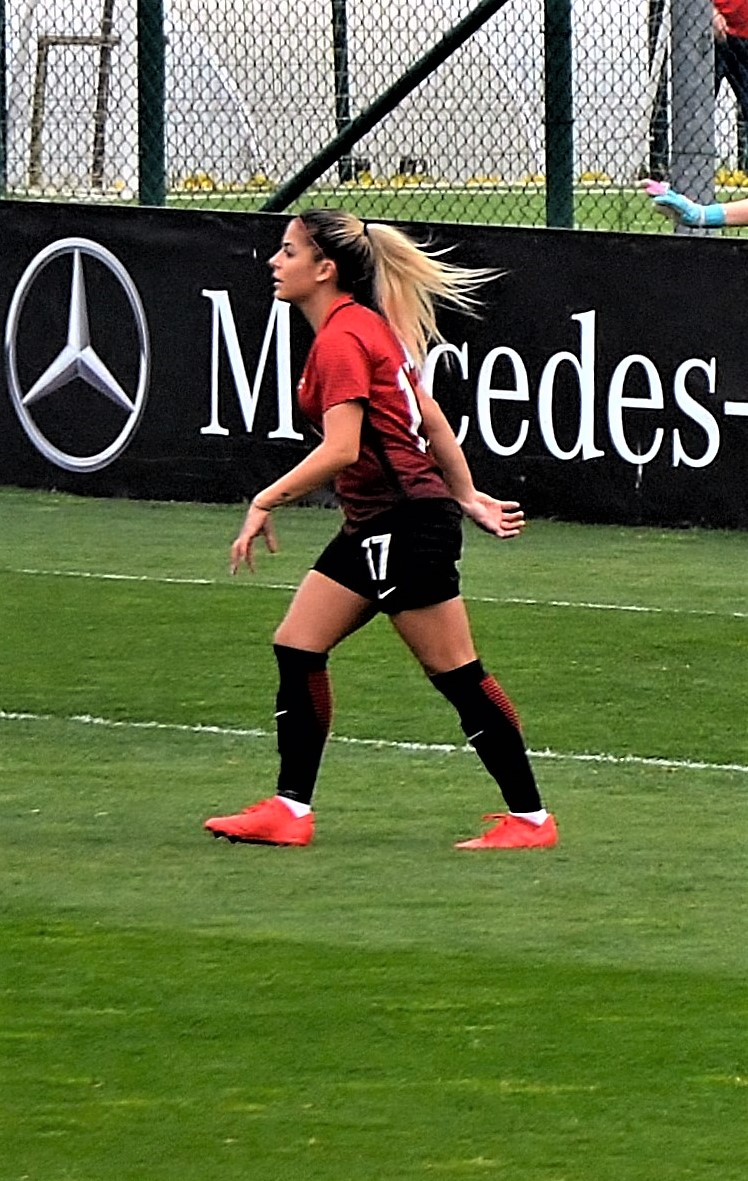
Sevgi Çınar playing for Turkey national in the friendly match against Estonia at TFF Riva Facility on 7 April 2018.

She debuted in the Turkey Girls' U-17 national team playing in the friendly match against Bulgaria on 1 July 2009. Çınar scored a total of five goals in two friendly matches against Moldova in August 2009. At the 2011 UEFA Women's U-17 Championship – Group 6 matches in Belgium, she scored three goals in the match against the Armenian nationals that ended 7–0 for the Turkish side.

After appearing twelve times for the U-17 national team, she played in the U-19 team for the first time in the 2011 UEFA Women's U-19 Championship Second qualifying round – Group 3 match against Germany on 2 April 2011. In the friendly match against the U-19 team from Wales, Sevgi Çınar scored the only goal for Turkey in September 2012.

She scored a goal for Konak Belediyespor in the preliminary group match of 2013–14 UEFA Women's Champions League against the Bulgarian team FC NSA Sofia. Çınar shot also a goal against RTP Unia Racibórz from Poland in the Round-32 of the same championship. On 28 November 2013, Çınar scored the first goal for Turkey in the 2015 FIFA Women's World Cup qualification – UEFA Group 6 match against Montenegron team that ended with 3–1.

Çınar took part in three matches of the 2019 FIFA Women's World Cup qualification – UEFA preliminary round.

International goals
Date	Venue	Opponent	Competition	Result	Scored
Turkey girls' U-17
August 22, 2009	Stadionul Dinamo Chișinău, Moldova	Moldova	Friendly	W 6–0	2
August 24, 2009	Stadionul Dinamo Chișinău, Moldova	Moldova	Friendly	W 8–0	3
October 8, 2010	Marcel De Kerpel Stadium, Wetteren, Belgium	Armenia	2011 UEFA Women's U-17 Championship – Group 6	W 7–0	3
Turkey women's U-19
September 28, 2012	Mudanya, Bursa, Turkey	Wales	Friendly	D 1–1	1
Turkey women's
November 28, 2013	Buca Arena İzmir, Turkey	Montenegro	2015 FIFA Women's World Cup qualification – UEFA Group 6	W 3–1	1
March 5, 2017	GoldCity Stadium Antalya, Turkey	Kosovo	GoldCity Women's Cup 2017	W 4–2	2

== Career statistics ==
As of 22 September 2024.

Club	Season	League			Continental		National		Total	
Club	Season	Division	Apps	Goals	Apps	Goals	Apps	Goals	Apps	Goals
Adana İdmanyurduspor	2008–09	Second League	8	16	–	–	3	5	11	21
Adana İdmanyurduspor	2009–10	First League	16	9	–	–	9	9	25	18
Adana İdmanyurduspor	2010–11	First League	22	26	–	–	15	7	37	33
Adana İdmanyurduspor	2011–12	First League	5	4	–	–	7	3	12	6
Adana İdmanyurduspor	Total		51	55	–	–	34	24	85	79
Konak	2011–12	First League	10	4	–	–	0	0	10	4
Konak	2012–13	First League	17	3	–	–	7	1	24	4
Konak	2013–14	First League	11	8	7	2	5	1	23	11
Konak	2014–15	First League	3	5	–	–	2	0	5	5
Konak	2015–16	First League	16	12	3	1	0	0	19	13
Konak	2016–17	First League	22	24	3	1	6	2	31	27
Konak	2017–18	First League	0	0	3	3	0	0	3	3
Konak	Total		79	56	16	7	20	4	115	67
Ataşehir	2017–18	First League	17	9	0	0	3	0	20	9
Ataşehir	2018–19	First League	0	0	3	1	0	0	3	1
Ataşehir	Total		17	9	3	1	3	0	23	10
ALG	2018–19	First League	15	12	–	–	5	0	20	12
Beşiktaş	2019–20	First League	12	7	3	1	3	0	18	8
Beşiktaş	2020–21	First League	0	0	0	0	3	0	3	0
Beşiktaş	2021–22	Super League	0	0	0	0	0	0	0	0
Beşiktaş	2022–23	Super League	15	1	0	0	0	0	15	1
Beşiktaş	Total		27	8	3	1	6	0	36	9
Beylerbeyi	2023–24	Super League	28	5	0	0	0	0	28	5
Beylerbeyi	2024–25	Super League	3	1	0	0	0	0	3	1
Beylerbeyi	Total		31	6	0	0	0	0	21	6
Career total			220	146	22	9	68	28	310	183

== Honours ==
=== Club ===
Turkish Women's First League

Konak Belediyespor
Winners (5): 2012–13, 2013–14, 2014–15, 2015–16, 2016–17

Ataşehir Belediyespor
Winners (1): 2017–18

ALG Spor
Runners-up (1): 2018–19

=== Individual ===
Top scorer 2010–11 Women's First League with Adana İdmanyurduspor
Top scorer 2016–17 Women's First League with Konak Belediyespor
