= Raluca Sârghe =

Romanian footballer

Monica Raluca Sârghe Simes
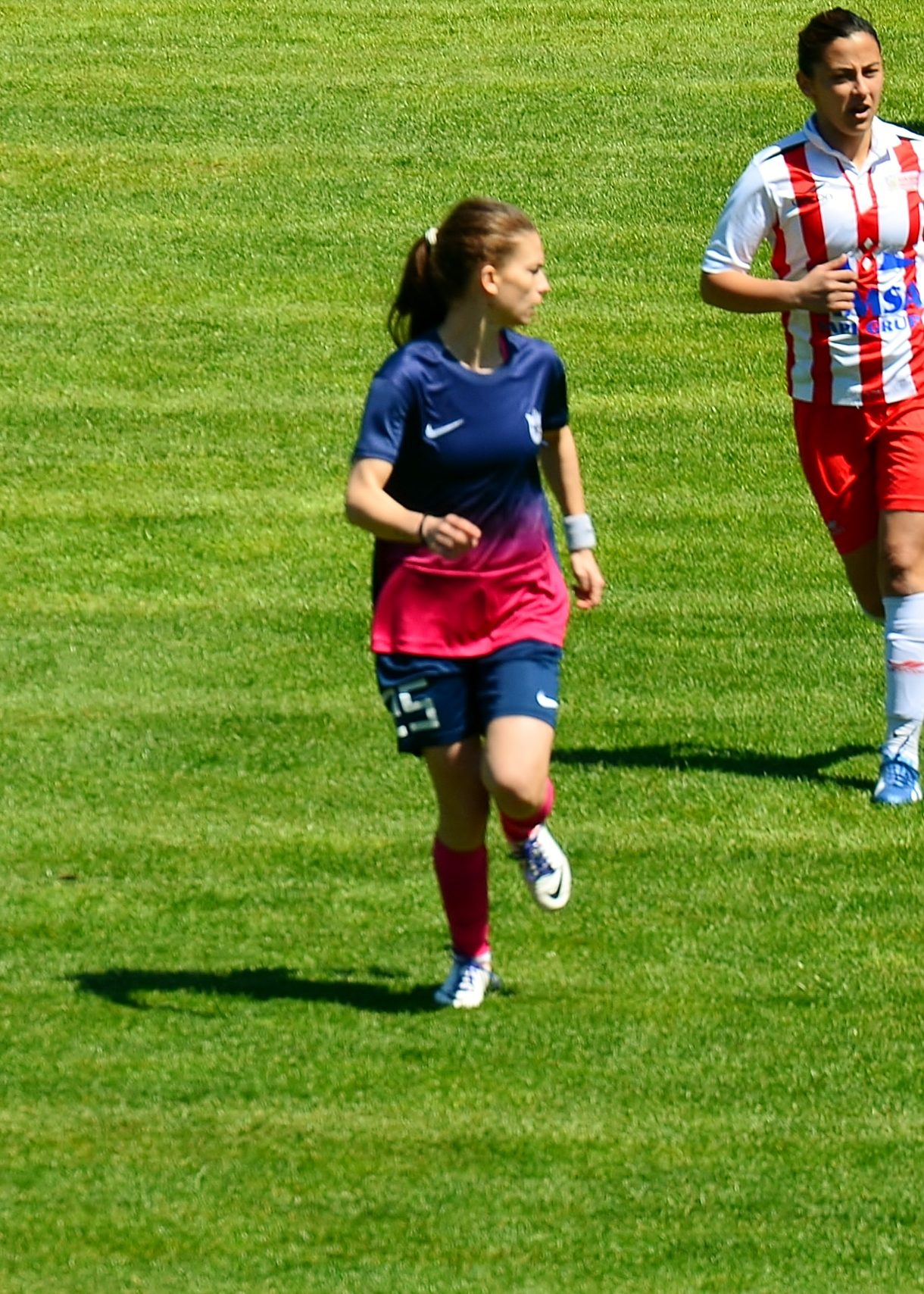
- Monica Raluca Sârghe playing for Konak Belediyespor in the 2014–15 season.

Personal information
- Full name: Monica Raluca Sârghe Simes
- Date of birth: 24 July 1987 (age 39)
- Place of birth: Hunedoara, Romania
- Position: Midfielder

Senior career*
Years	Team	Apps	(Gls)
2004–2009	Clujana		
2009-2010	AS Volos		
2010–2012	Olimpia Cluj		
2012–2018	Konak Belediyespor	88	(18)

International career
2011–	Romania	52	(3)
- * Club domestic league appearances and goals as of retirement

Monica Raluca Sârghe Simes is a former Romanian football player and current manager. She helped her teams win eight championships in Romania and five in Turkey also amassing 40 appearances in the UEFA Champions League as well as 52 caps for her country.

== Playing career ==
Sârghe performed athletics before she switched over to football playing. "This advantage makes her one of the fastest wingers in Europe" as noted in a Turkish newspaper.

=== Club ===
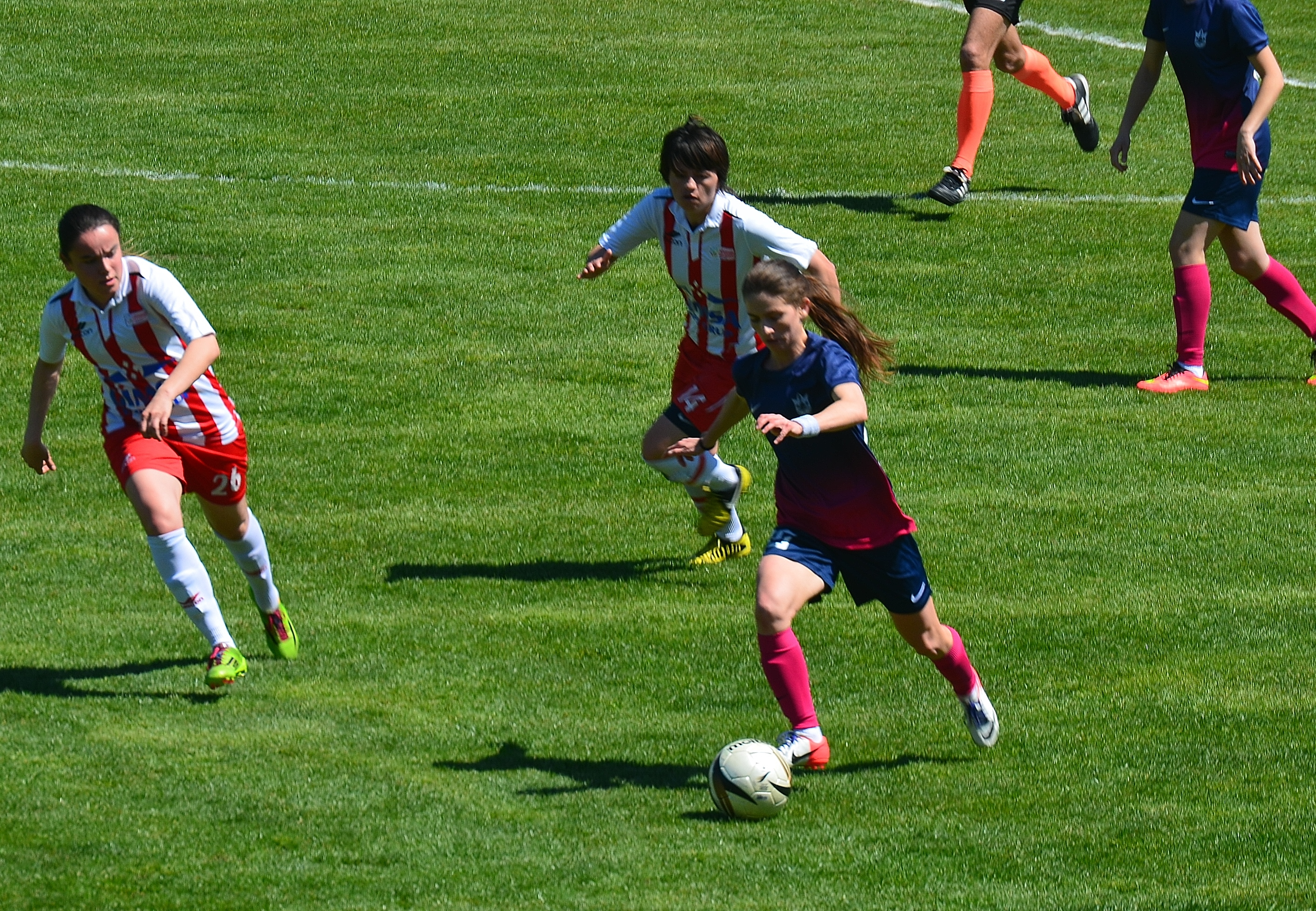
Monica Raluca Sârghe (navy/rose) attacking Ataşehir Belediyespor in the 2014–15 season .

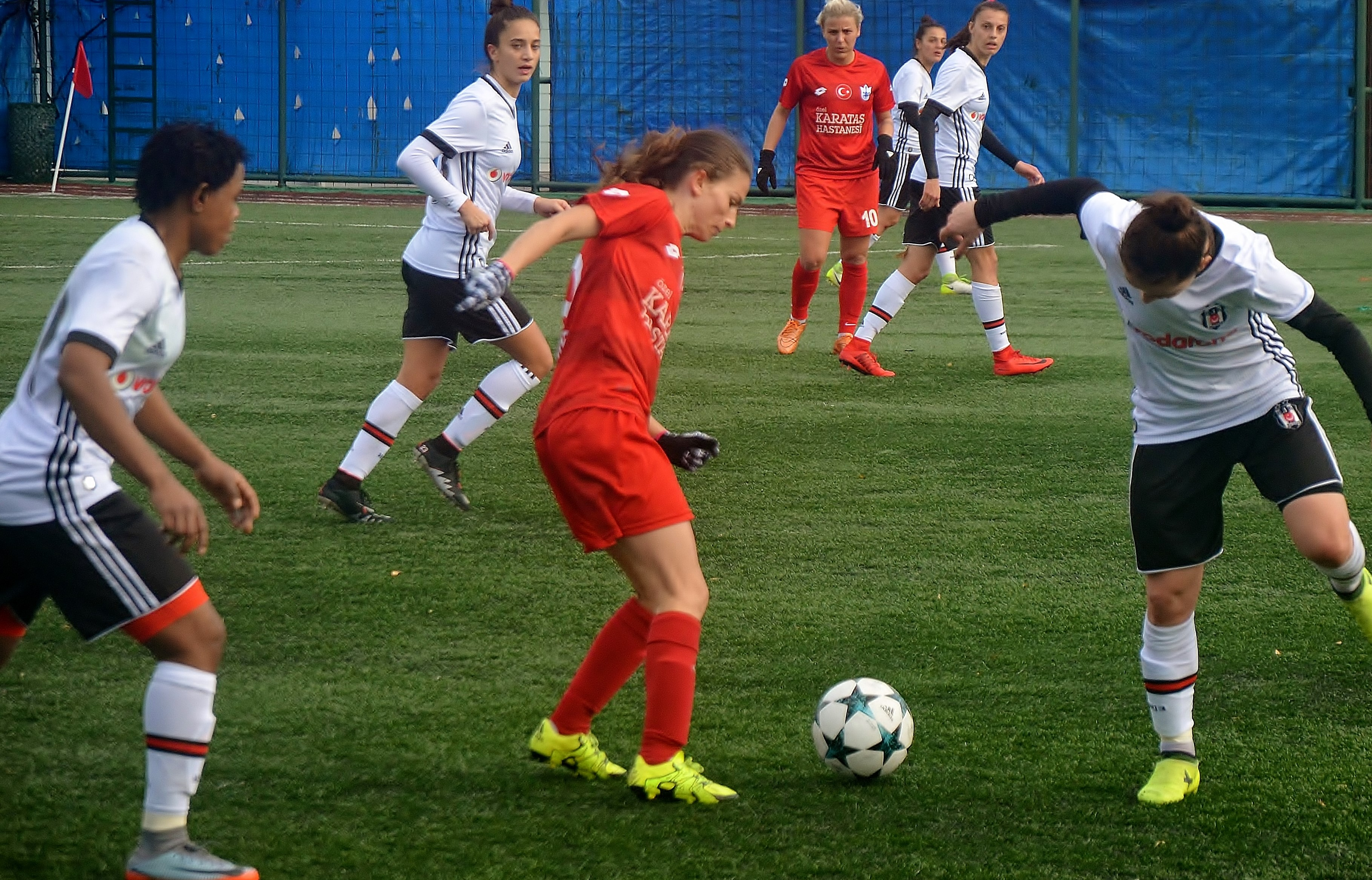
Monica Raluca Sârghe (red) playing for Konak Belediyespor against Beşiktaş J.K. in the 2017–18 season's away match.

Sârghe played in the Romanian 1st League for Clujana, She enjoyed six championships with them, and took part at the Champions League. She took part in three qualification and two knockout round matches of the 2011–12 UEFA Women's Champions League matches. Sârghe played in three qualifying matches and one knockout stage matches of the 2012–13 UEFA Women's Champions League, scoring one goal.

She moved to Greece in 2009-2010 season to join AS Volos.

After a year away, Sârghe returned to Romania when she was transferred to Olimpia Cluj. During her time there, she lifted two league championship trophies.

In November 2012, she moved together with her fellow countrywoman Cosmina Dușa to Turkey to join Konak Belediyespor in Izmir, which played in the First league. She inspired her team to win five consecutive championship titles (2012 and 2017). During this time she helped her team reach the UEFA Women's Champions League quarter finals. Sârghe took part in six matches of the 2013–14 UEFA Women's Champions League, in three matches of the 2014–15 UEFA Women's Champions League qualifying round and three matches of the 2016–17 UEFA Women's Champions League qualifying round, and scored two goals in total. At the 2017–18 UEFA Women's Champions League qualifying round in Tbilisi, Georgia, she played in two of the three matches for her team.

=== International ===
She was a member of the Romanian national team, earning 52 caps, and served as their captain.

In 2010 and 2011, she played in four matches of the 2011 FIFA Women's World Cup qualification – UEFA Group 4, and scored one goal.

She participated at the UEFA Women's Euro 2013 qualifying – Group 2, capping in all ten matches and scoring one goal.

In 2013 and 2014, she appeared in ten matches for the national team at the 2015 FIFA Women's World Cup qualification – UEFA Group 2, and scored one goal.

Goals for the Romanian WNT in official competitions
Competition	Stage	Date	Location	Opponent	Goals	Result	Overall
2011 FIFA World Cup	Qualifiers	2010–03–27	Sarajevo	Bosnia and Herzegovina	1	5–0	1
UEFA Euro 2013	Qualifiers	2011–10–27	Mogoşoaia	Turkey	1	7–1	1
2015 FIFA World Cup	Qualifiers	2013–09–20	Strumica	North Macedonia	1	9–1	1

== Coaching and managerial career ==
Sârghe began her coaching career with historic Turkish club Altay SK which she took from the third division until they were promoted to the first division.

She then transferred to her former club and most successful Turkish women's football team Konak Belediyespor as an assistant manager. She guided them to the playoff quarter finals where they lost to Turkish powerhouse Beşiktaş JK.

Her feats attracted the attention of Carmen Bucharest where she signed the following year. With a newborn baby, she became the face of footballer mothers by helping the team achieve remarkable performances against established teams in Romania and also helped guide them to the Romania Cup final, before being let go by club officials for unexplainable reasons. Carmen Bucharest dissolved at the end of the season.

Her success in such a short attracted the attention of Romanian footballing legend Gheorghe Hagi who signed Sârghe to Farul Constanta for the 2023-24 season.

== Personal life ==
Sârghe married Andrew Simes in 2019. In 2022, they had a son, named William.

== Career statistics ==
As of March 18, 2018.

Club	Season	League			Continental		National		Total	
Club	Season	Division	Apps	Goals	Apps	Goals	Apps	Goals	Apps	Goals
Clujana; Olimpia Cluj	2004–12	Liga I Feminin			9	1	18	2		
Clujana; Olimpia Cluj	Total				9	1	18	2		
Konak Belediyespor	2012–13	First League	14	6	–	–	0	0	14	6
Konak Belediyespor	2013–14	First League	11	1	6	0	7	1	24	2
Konak Belediyespor	2014–15	First League	16	9	3	1	3	0	22	10
Konak Belediyespor	2015–16	First League	17	1	0	0	0	0	17	1
Konak Belediyespor	2016–17	First League	17	1	3	1	0	0	20	2
Konak Belediyespor	2017–18	First League	13	0	2	0	0	0	15	0
Konak Belediyespor	Total		88	18	14	2	10	1	112	21
Career total					23	3	28	3		

== Honours ==
Turkish Women's First Football League

Konak Belediyespor
Winners (5): 2012–13, 2013–14, 2014–15, 2015–16, 2016–17

Romania Women's First Football League

Clujana
Winners (6): 2003-04, 2004-05, 2005-06, 2006-07, 2007-08, 2008-09
Olimpia Cluj
Winners (2): 2010-11, 2011-12
