= Nicol Camacho =

Colombian soccer player (born 1999)

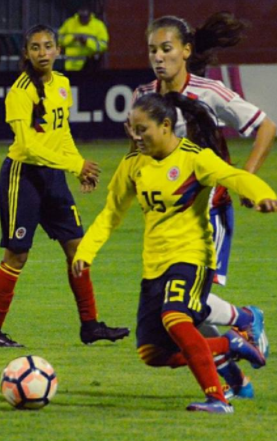

Personal information
- Full name: Nicol Julieth Camacho Ariza
- Date of birth: 24 October 1999 (age 27)
- Place of birth: Vélez, Santander, Colombia
- Height: 1.48 m (4 ft 10 1/2 in)
- Position: Midfielder

Team information
- Current team: Llaneros

Senior career*
Years	Team	Apps	(Gls)
- Atlético Bucaramanga
2022–2023	Konak Belediyespor	17	(2)
2023–2024	?		
2024–	Llaneros		

International career
- Colombia U-20
- * Club domestic league appearances and goals as of 5 February 2026

Nicol Julieth Camacho Ariza (Vélez, Santander, 24 October 1999) is a Colombian professional soccer, who plays as midfielder in the Liga DIMAYOR for the Villavicencio-based club Llaneros. She was a member of the Colombia women's U-20 team.

== Personal life ==
Camacho first became interested in soccer at the age of eleven. She had to play with boys as there were no teams for girls. Her talent was spotted by Óscar Flórez who was the coach for Club Real Sociedad.

== Club career ==
She joined the women's team for Atlético Bucaramanga when she was 17 years old.

In October 2022, she moved to Turkey, and joined Konak Belediyespor to play in the 2022–23 Super League.

== International career ==
She played for the Colombia women's U-20 team in the 2018 South American U-20 Women's Championship in Ecuador to qualify for the 2019 FIFA Women's World Cup in France.
