= Priscilla Hagan =

Ghanaian footballer

Personal information
- Date of birth: 8 April 1996 (age 30)
- Place of birth: Ghana
- Height: 1.65 m (5 ft 5 in)
- Position: Forward

Team information
- Current team: Olimpija Ljubljana
- Number: 99

Youth career
- 2009–2015: Blessed Ladies

Senior career*
Years	Team	Apps	(Gls)
2015–2017	Lokomotiva Brno Horní Heršpice		
2017–2018	Aire-Le-Lignon		
2018–2019	Olimpia Cluj		
2019–2020	Konak Belediyespor		
2020	TS ROW Rybnik	6	(2)
2021	AP Lotos Gdańsk	8	(3)
2021	Pomurje	1	(0)
2021–	Olimpija Ljubljana	7	(7)

International career
- Ghana
- * Club domestic league appearances and goals as of 1 January 2022

Priscilla Hagan (born 8 April 1996) is a Ghanaian footballer who plays as a forward who plays for Slovenian club Olimpija Ljubljana. She is a member of the Ghana women's national team.

== Career ==
=== Club ===
In February 2019, Hagan moved to Turkey and joined Konak Belediyespor for the second half of the 2018–19 Turlish Women's First League season.

=== International ===
Hagan was called up to the Ghana women's national football team, however, could not play at the 2018 Africa Women Cup of Nations due to an injury she suffered at training during the national team's tour in Zambia and Kenya.

Hagan had another call-up to the team for the 2020 Turkish Women's Cup.
