= Konak Belediyespor =

Konak Belediyespor Women's Football
- Full name: Konak Belediye Spor Kulübü
- Founded: 2006; 20 years ago
- Ground: Göztepe Gürsel Aksel Stadium
- Coordinates: 38°23′48″N 27°04′33″E
- Manager: (Turkey) Ali Alanç
- League: Turkish Women's Super League
- 2021–22: 3rd (Group B)
Home colours

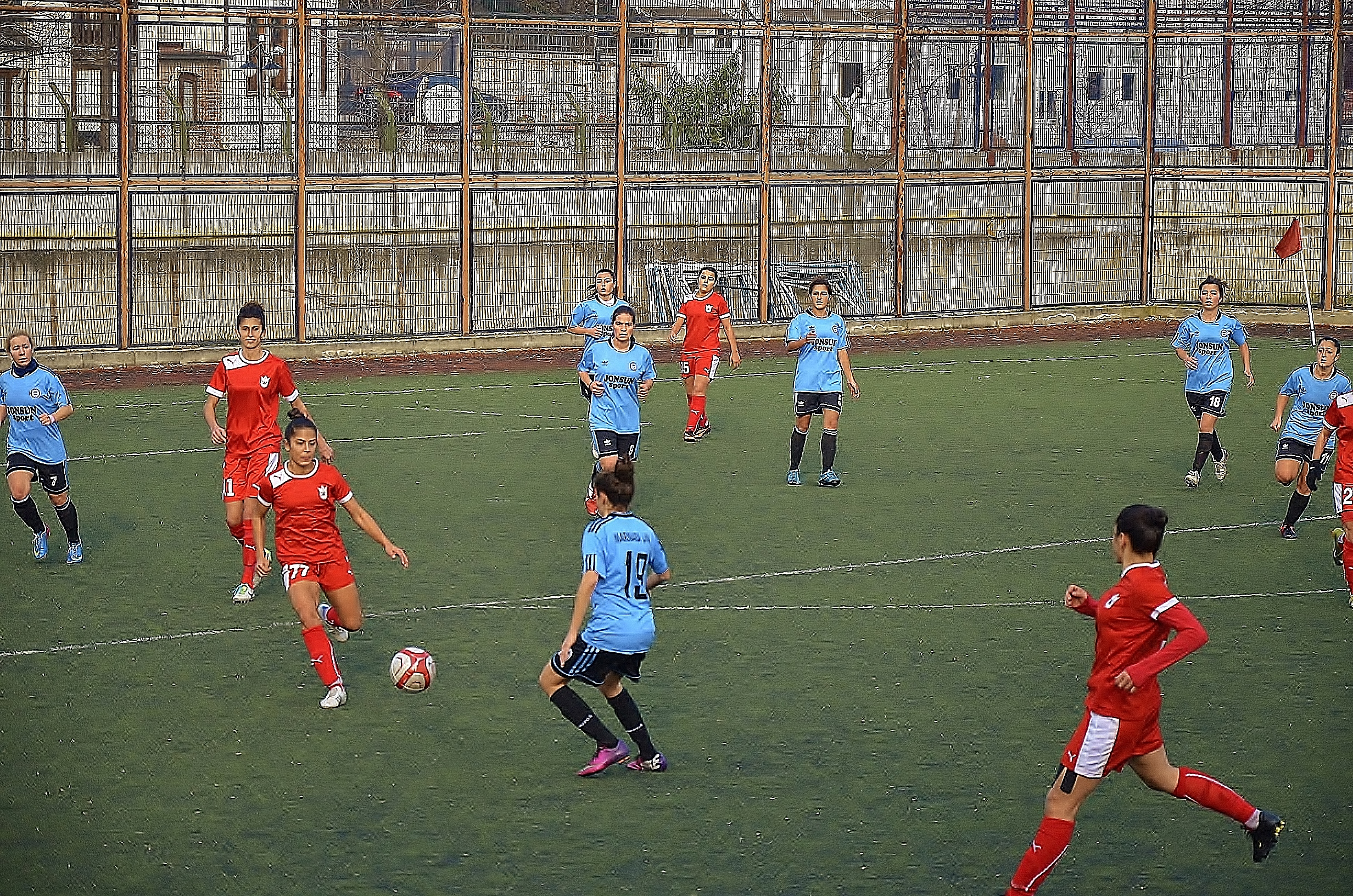
Konak Belediyespor (red) at away match against Marmara Üniversitesi Spor (2013–14 season)

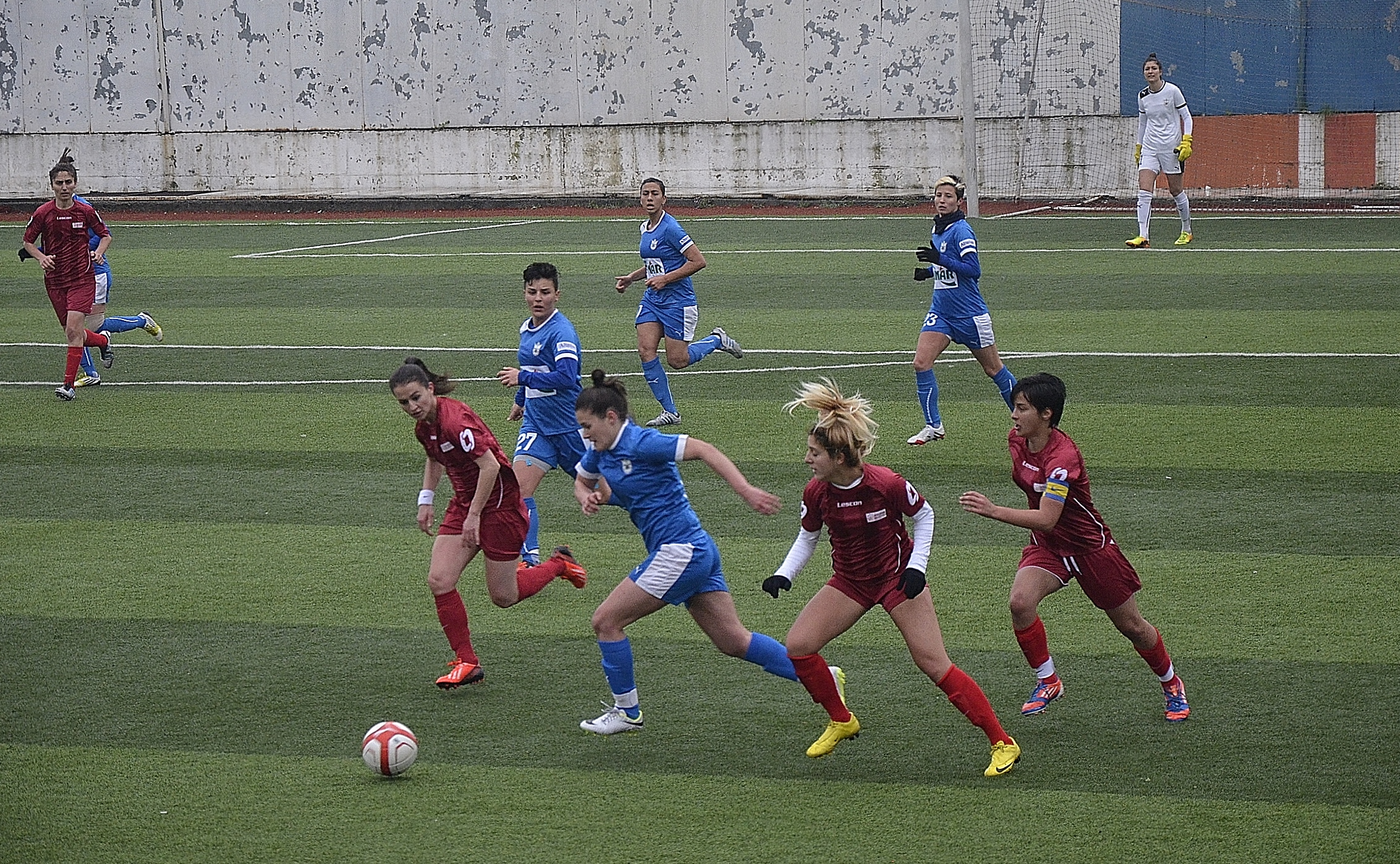
Konak Belediyespor (blue) at away match against Ataşehir Belediyespor (2013–14 season)

Konak Belediyespor Women's Football (Turkish: Konak Belediyespor Bayan Futbol Takımı) is a professional women's football team of the Turkish multi-sport club Konak Belediyespor based in Konak district of İzmir, Turkey. The team was established by the district municipality in 2006.

Many players of the Konak Belediyespor women's team are members of the Turkey women's national football team. The club also maintains the girls under-17 and under-15 football teams.

== History ==
After placing third in the 2009–10 season in the Women's First Football League, they became runner-up the next season. The team won the league championship in the 2012–13 season.

The women's team played in the 2013–14 UEFA Women's Champions League qualifying round and advanced to the round of 16.

The team finished the 2013–14 Women's First League season as the undefeated champion reaching their second title one game before the end of the play-off round. As of May 10, 2014, the team holds a 36-game undefeated streak record in domestic official competitions after the loss against their rival Ataşehir Belediyespor in the away match on November 11, 2012.

The team played at the 2014–15 UEFA Women's Champions League qualifying round against Latvian Rīgas FS, Belarusian FC Minsk and FC Zürich Frauen from Switzerland. They won two matches and lost one, becoming runners-up in the group. That result did not suffice to advance to the knock-out stage.

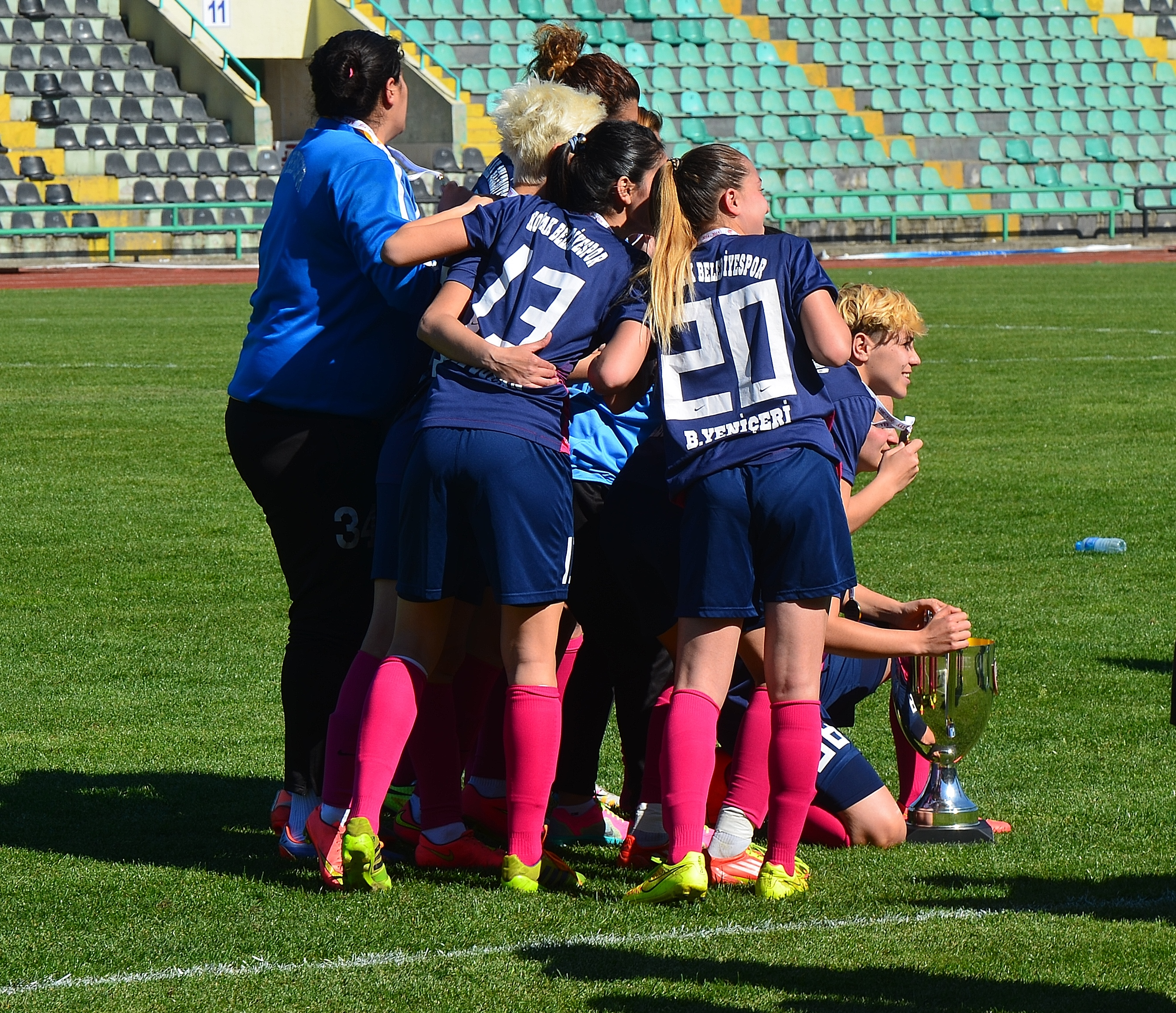
Konak Belediyespor team with champion trophy after defeating Ataşehir Belediyespor in the 2014–15 season play-off match.

Konak Belediyespor finished the 2014–15 season undefeated and with the same point as Ataşehir Belediyespor. They won the play-off game and became champion for three consecutive time.

Konak Belediyespor women played in the 2015–16 UEFA Women's Champions League qualifying round – Group 1 against FC Minsk, KF Vllaznia Shkodër and SFK 2000 Sarajevo. They finished at third place after losing two games and winning only one. They failed so to advance to the knockout phase.

Konak Belediyespor's unbeaten run, which stretched to 58 league games in four seasons beginning after the last loss against Ataşehir Belediyespor in the 2012–13 season's away match on November 11, 2012, was ended by 1207 Antalya Muratpaşa Belediye Spor with a 0–4 defeat at the 2015–16 season's home match on December 5, 2015.

The team finished the 2015–16 season as champion, winning this title fourth time in a row. They took part at the Group 9 of the 2016–17 UEFA Women's Champions League qualifying round, lost two of the three matches, and was so eliminated.

Konak Belediyespor finished the regular season 2016–17 second behind Beşiktaş J.K., which had recently entered the First League. Because the league format was changed that season, a championship play-off round followed, in that Konak overtook Beşiktaş and won their fifth title in a row.

The team won their first game at the 2017–18 UEFA Women's Champions League qualifying round in Tbilisi, Georgia against the host FC Martve by 5–0.

The team finished the regular season of 2017–18 even on points with Beşiktaş J.K. behind the champion Ataşehir Belediyespor. The regular time of the play-off match between the two teams ended with 1–1 draw. In the extension time, Beşiktaş J.K. scored three penalty goals, winning the match by 4–1. Konak Belediyespor took so the third place behind the runners-up Beşiktaş J.K.

Konak Belediyespor finished the 2018–19 First League season in the third place.

== Stadium ==
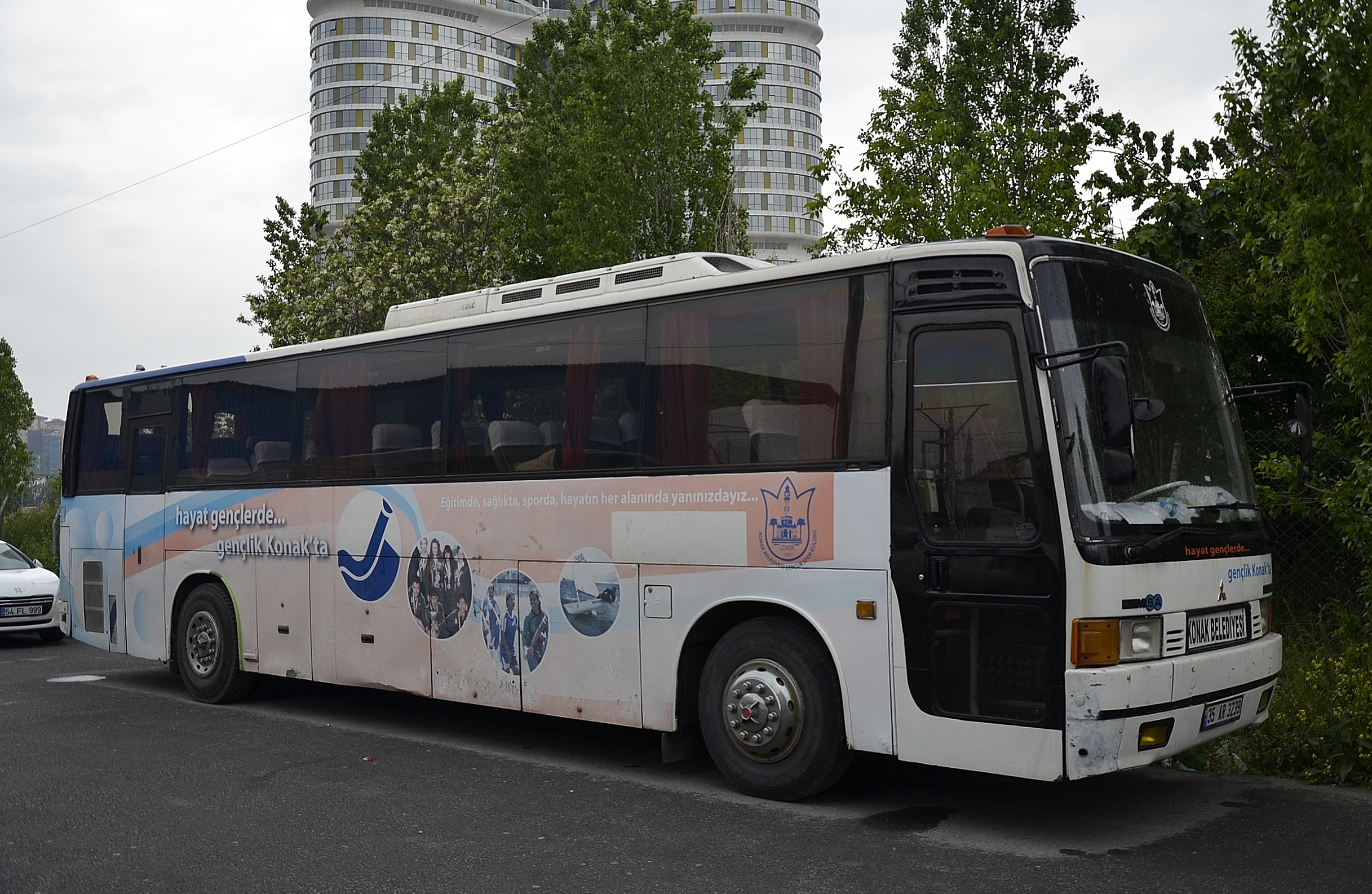
Team bus of Konak Belediyespor

The team play their home matches at the Göztepe Gürsel Aksel Stadium, which is located in Göztepe neighborhood of Konak district in İzmir. The venue has a capacity of 1,500 spectators. Its ground has a natural grass surface.

== Statistics ==
As of 5 February 2023.

| Season | League | Pos. | Pld | W | D | L | GF | GA | GD | Pts |
|---|---|---|---|---|---|---|---|---|---|---|
| 2006–07 | Women's League Gr. B | 7 | 13 | 1 | 1 | 11 | 6 | 91 | −85 | 4 |
| 2007–08 | Women's League | 12 | 12 | 5 | 2 | 5 | 27 | 26 | +1 | 17 |
| 2008–09 | First League | 6 | 18 | 6 | 3 | 9 | 32 | 28 | +4 | 21 |
| 2009–10 | First League | 3 | 18 | 12 | 0 | 6 | 51 | 30 | +21 | 36 |
| 2010–11 | First League | 2 | 22 | 14 | 5 | 3 | 68 | 19 | +49 | 47 |
| 2011–12 | First League | 5 | 20 | 10 | 3 | 7 | 39 | 20 | +19 | 33 |
| 2012–13 | First League | 1 | 18 | 17 | 0 | 1 | 72 | 8 | +64 | 51 |
| 2013–14 | First League | 1 | 20 | 16 | 4 | 0 | 73 | 15 | +58 | 52 |
| 2014–15 | First League | 1 | 19 | 17 | 2 | 0 | 107 | 3 | +104 | 53 |
| 2015–16 | First League | 1 | 18 | 16 | 0 | 2 | 91 | 16 | +75 | 48 |
| 2016–17 | First League | 1 | 26 | 20 | 2 | 4 | 78 | 28 | +50 | 62 |
| 2017–18 | First League | 3 | 19 | 13 | 3 | 3 | 75 | 21 | +54 | 42 |
| 2018–19 | First League | 3 | 18 | 12 | 3 | 3 | 47 | 20 | +27 | 39 |
| 2019–20 | First League | 3 | 16 | 12 | 1 | 3 | 70 | 19 | +51 | 37 |
| 2020–21 | First League Gr. D | 6 | 4 | 2 | 1 | 1 | 6 | 4 | +2 | 7 |
| 2021–22 | Super League Gr. B | 3 (^{1}) | 24 | 12 | 7 | 5 | 38 | 21 | +17 | 43 |
| 2022–23 | Super League Gr. B | 7 (^{2}) | 18 | 6 | 2 | 10 | 32 | 39 | −7 | 20 |
Green marks a season followed by promotion, red a season followed by relegation.

- (^{1}): Finished Group B as third, eliminated in the play-off quarterfinals
- (^{2}): Finished Group B as seventh, eliminated in the play-off first round

== Current squad ==
As of 5 February 2023.

Head coach: (Turkey) Ali Alanç

Note: Flags indicate national team as defined under FIFA eligibility rules; some limited exceptions apply. Players may hold more than one non-FIFA nationality.

| No. | Pos. | Nation | Player |
|---|---|---|---|
| 12 | GK | TUR | İlayda Salgar |
| 24 | GK | CMR | Paulline Charlotte Alang Ayangma |
| 2 | DF | TUR | Tuana Demirbaş |
| 6 | DF | NGA | Maryam Juke Ibrahim |
| 7 | DF | TUR | Funda Aydınalp |
| 22 | DF | TUR | Berfin Elif Ceylan |
| 23 | DF | TUR | Beyza Nur Altınışık |
| 35 | DF | TUR | Suzan Durmaz |
| 11 | MF | TUR | Rabiya İsgi |
| 20 | MF | COL | Nicol Camacho |
| 99 | MF | TUR | Gözde Gül |

| No. | Pos. | Nation | Player |
|---|---|---|---|
| 9 | FW | COL | Lina Fernanda Martínez Álvarez |
| 13 | FW | TUR | Sıla Besra Tetik |
| 14 | FW | TUR | Zeynep Ela Kara |
| 25 | FW | TUR | Elif Oğul |
| 30 | FW | TUR | Betül Bayraktar |
| 36 | FW | TUR | Gülşah Güvendi |
| 42 | FW | COL | Kendy Morales |
| 18 | | TUR | Sinem Ayazma |
| 19 | | TUR | Buse İşçi |
| 53 | | TUR | Yaren Civeleki |

== Former managers ==
- (Turkey) Hüseyin Tavur (2007–2015)

== International results ==
| Event | Stage | Date | Venue | Opponent | Result | Scorers |
|---|---|---|---|---|---|---|
| 2013–14 UEFA Champions League | QR; Group 1; 1st | Aug 8, 2013 | Bosnia and Herzegovina, Sarajevo | (Bulgaria) FC NSA Sofia | W 2–0 | Duman, Çınar. |
| 2013–14 UEFA Champions League | QR; Group 1; 1st | Aug 10, 2013 | Bosnia and Herzegovina, Sarajevo | (Bosnia and Herzegovina) SFK 2000 | W 2–1 | Dușa (2). |
| 2013–14 UEFA Champions League | QR; Group 1; 1st | Aug 13, 2013 | Bosnia and Herzegovina, Sarajevo | (Wales) Cardiff City FC | W 1–0 | Duman. |
| 2013–14 UEFA Champions League | Round of 32 | Oct 10, 2013 | Turkey, İzmir | (Poland) RTP Unia Racibórz | W 2–1 | Dușa, Çınar. |
| 2013–14 UEFA Champions League | Round of 32 | Oct 17, 2013 | Poland, Racibórz | (Poland) RTP Unia Racibórz | D 0–0 | |
| 2013–14 UEFA Champions League | Round of 16 | Nov 10, 2013 | Turkey, İzmir | (Austria) SV Neulengbach | L 0–3 | |
| 2013–14 UEFA Champions League | Round of 16 | Nov 14, 2013 | Austria, Neulengbach | (Austria) SV Neulengbach | L 0–3 | |
| 2014–15 UEFA Champions League | QR; Group 1; 2nd | Aug 9, 2014 | Latvia, Riga | (Latvia) Rīgas FS | W 11–0 | Dușa (5), Uraz (3), Yağ, Sârghe, Topçu. |
| 2014–15 UEFA Champions League | QR; Group 1; 2nd | Aug 11, 2014 | Latvia, Riga | (Belarus) FC Minsk | W 2–1 | Topçu (2). |
| 2014–15 UEFA Champions League | QR; Group 1; 2nd | Aug 14, 2014 | Latvia, Riga | (Switzerland) FC Zürich Frauen | L 0–4 | |
| 2015–16 UEFA Champions League | QR; Group 1; 3rd | Aug 11, 2015 | Bosnia and Herzegovina, Sarajevo | (Belarus) FC Minsk | L 1–10 | Özgan (o.g.), Başkol. |
| 2015–16 UEFA Champions League | QR; Group 1; 3rd | Aug 13, 2015 | Bosnia and Herzegovina, Sarajevo | (Albania) KF Vllaznia Shkodër | W 5–1 | Çınar, Nurlu, Topçu, Hız, Yeniçeri. |
| 2015–16 UEFA Champions League | QR; Group 1; 3rd | Aug 16, 2015 | Bosnia and Herzegovina, Sarajevo | (Bosnia and Herzegovina) SFK 2000 | L 1–3 | Göksu. |
| 2016–17 UEFA Champions League | QR; Group 9; 3rd | Aug 23, 2016 | Netherlands, Oldenzaal | (Malta) Hibernians F.C. | W 5–0 | Dușa, Başkol, Çınar, Nurlu, Erol. |
| 2016–17 UEFA Champions League | QR; Group 9; 3rd | Aug 25, 2016 | Netherlands, Oldenzaal | (Hungary) Ferencvárosi TC | L 0–2 | |
| 2016–17 UEFA Champions League | QR; Group 9; 3rd | Aug 28, 2016 | Netherlands, Oldenzaal | (Netherlands) FC Twente | L 2–6 | Dușa, Sârghe |
| 2017–18 UEFA Champions League | QR; Group 1; 2nd | Aug 22, 2017 | Georgia | (Georgia (country)) WFC Martve | W 5–0 | Dușa, Hançar (2), Çınar (2) |
| 2017–18 UEFA Champions League | QR; Group 1; 2nd | Aug 25, 2017 | Georgia | (Slovakia) Partizán Bardejov | W 5–1 | Çınar, Erol, Hançar (3) |
| 2017–18 UEFA Champions League | QR; Group 1; 2nd | Aug 28, 2017 | Georgia | (Lithuania) Gintra Universitetas | L 1–3 | Hançar |

=== Ranking history ===
| Season | Rank | Points | Ref. |
|---|---|---|---|
| 2013–14 | 58 ▲ | 10.300 | |
| 2014–15 | 53 ▲ | 12.630 | |
| 2015–16 | 54 ▼ | 13.795 | |
| 2016–17 | 51 ▲ | 14.960 | |
| 2017–18 | 45 ▲ | 17.290 | |
| 2018–19 | 62 ▼ | 8.475 | |
| 2019–20 | 70 ▼ | 6.475 | |
| 2020–21 | 80 ▼ | 4.500 | |
| 2021–22 | 99 ▼ | 3.600 | |

== Notable former players ==
Turkey national team members

- Selda Akgöz (2017)
- Sevgi Çınar (2012–2017)
- Hanife Demiryol (2016)
- Sibel Duman (2012–2015)
- Eylül Elgalp (2013–2015)
- Esra Erol (2012–2015, 2016–2018)
- Kader Hançar (2018–2019)
- Gülbin Hız (2013–2015, 2017–2018)
- Gamze İskeçeli (2009–2013)
- Arzu Karabulut (2014–2015)
- Didem Karagenç (2012–2015)
- Ceren Nurlu (2010–2017)
- Fatma Şahin (2008–2015, 2017–2018)
- Busem Şeker (2018–2019)
- Ebru Topçu (2018–2019)
- Yağmur Uraz (2014–2015)
- Cansu Yağ (2012–2018)

Foreigners

- (Azerbaijan) Peritan Bozdağ (2012–2019)
- (Georgia (country)) Tatiana Matveeva (2014–2015), Nino Sutidze (2011–2014, 2015–2016), Khatia Tchkonia (2018–2019)
- (Ghana) Priscilla Hagan (2019)
- (North Macedonia) Eli Jakovska (2019)
- (Nigeria) Esther Sunday (2016–2018), Joy Bokiri (2019–2020)
- (Romania) Raluca Sârghe (2012–2018), Cosmina Dușa)2012–2020=

== Honours ==
Turkish Women's First Football League

- Winners (5): 2012–13, 2013–14, 2014–15, 2015–16, 2016–17
- Runners-up (1): 2010–11
- Third place (3): 2009–10, 2017–18, 2018–19

== Kit history ==
| 2013–14 home | 2013–14 away | 2014–15 home | 2015–16 home | 2015–16 away | 2016–17 home |

| 2016–17 away | 2017–18 away | 2018–19 away | 2019–20 away | 2021–22 home | 2021–22 away |

== Squad history ==
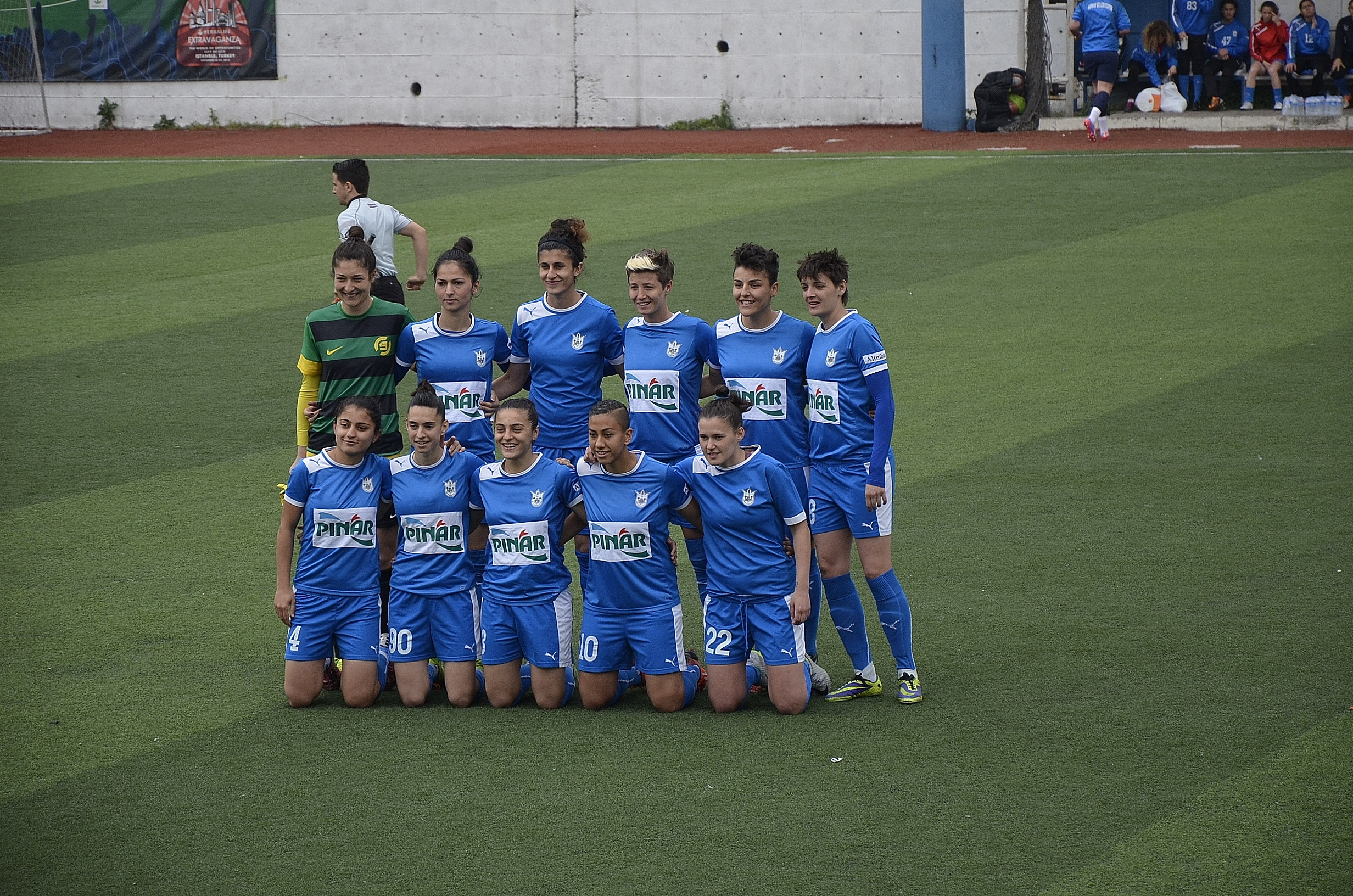
Konak Belediyespor squad in the 2013–14 season

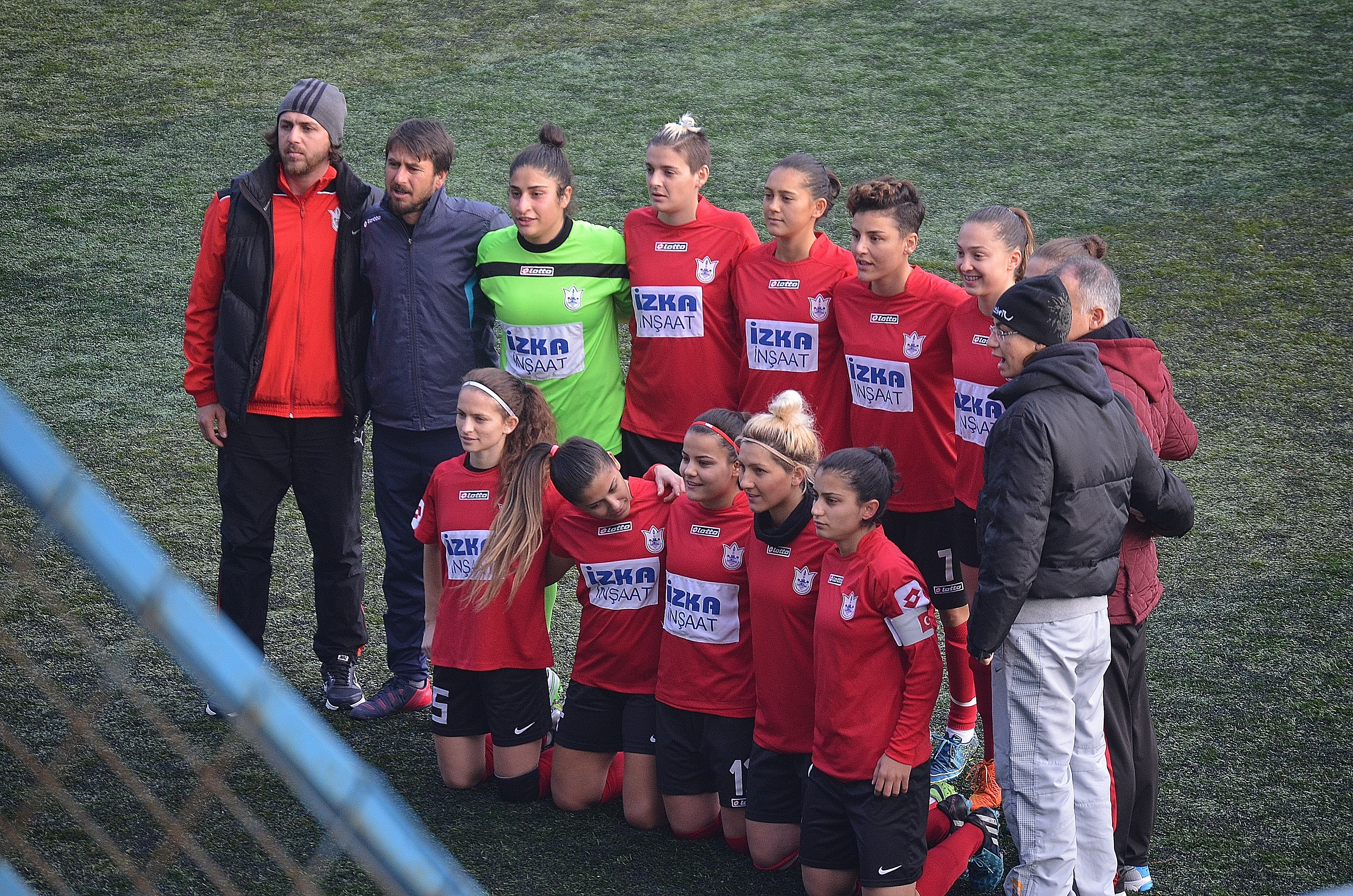
Konak Belediyespor squad in the 2015–16 season

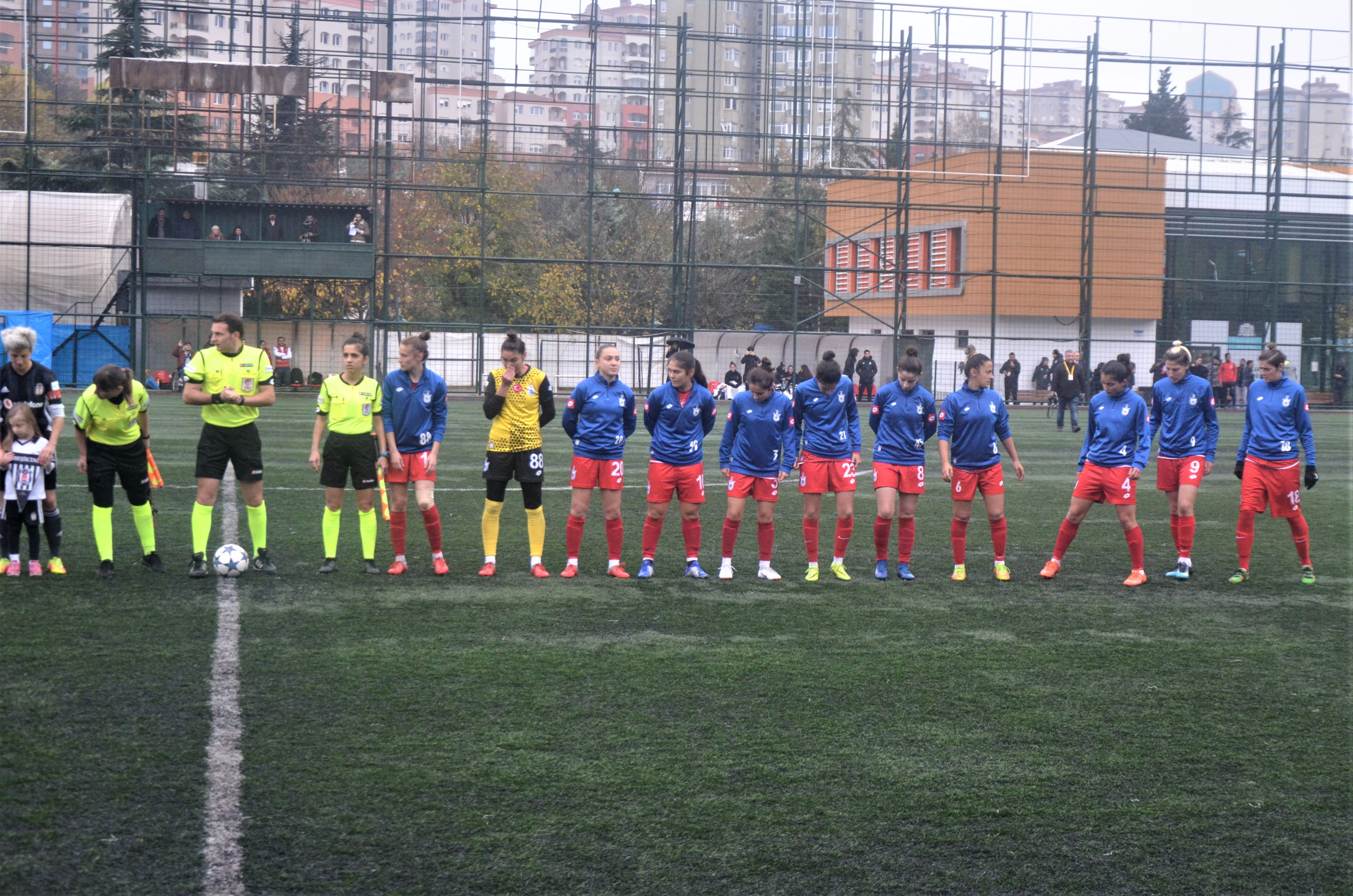
Konak Belediyespor squad in the 2018–19 season

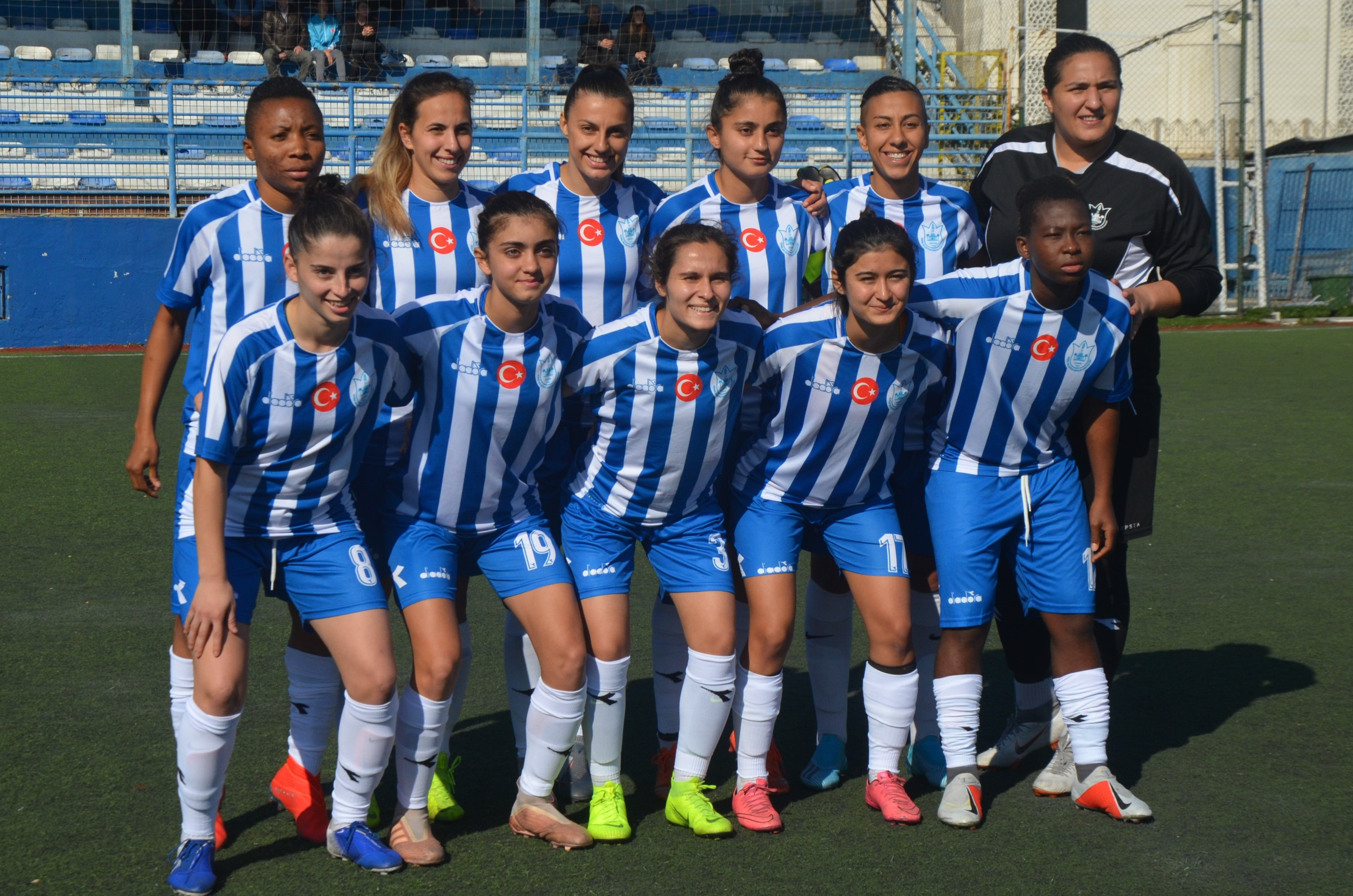
Konak Belediyespor squad in the 2019-20 season

== See also ==
- Turkish women in sports
