= Hüseyin Tavur =

Turkish football manager (born 1972)

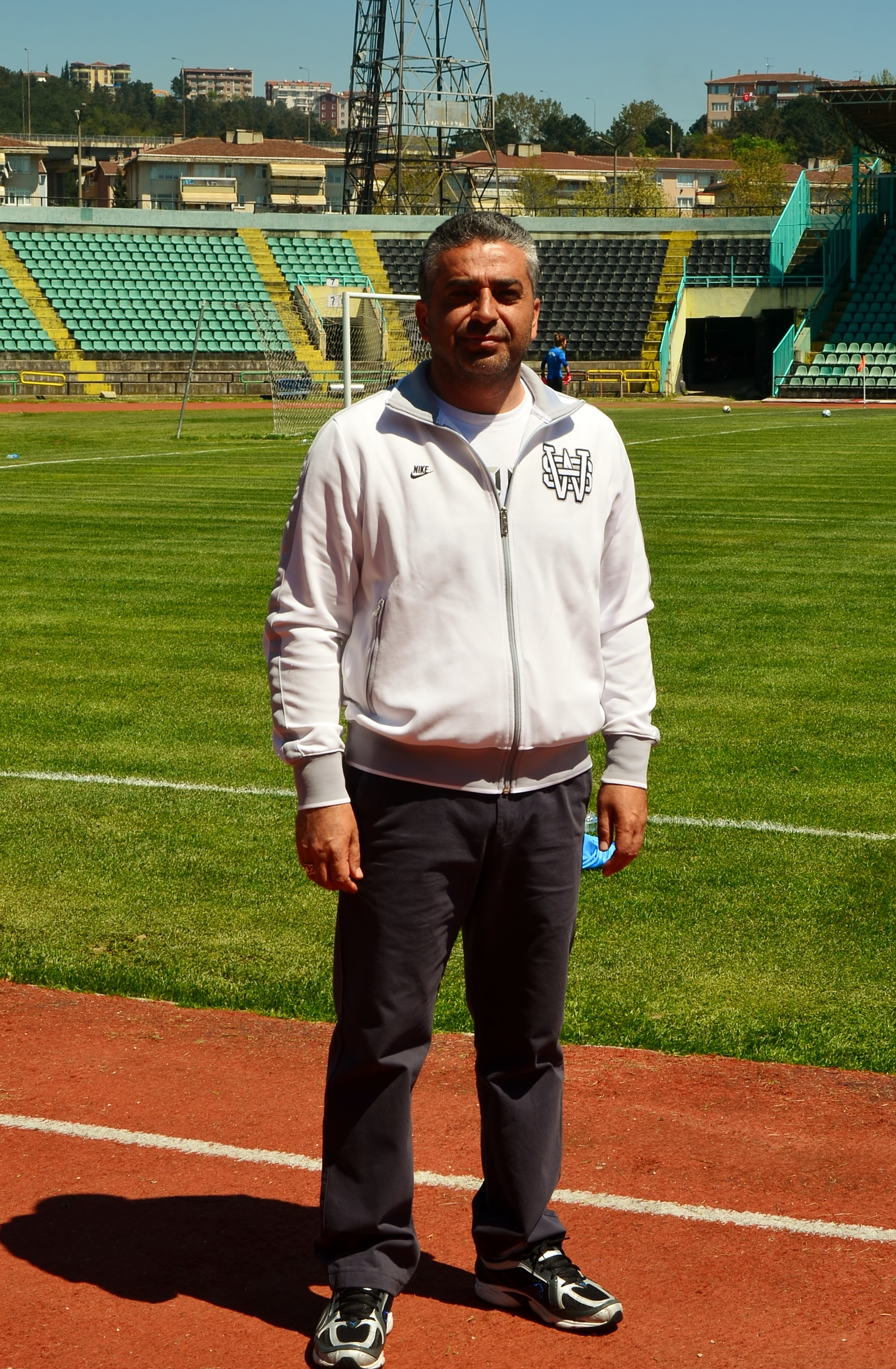
- Hüseyin Tavur (April 2015)

Personal information
- Date of birth: December 15, 1972 (age 53)
- Place of birth: Nevşehir, Turkey

Team information
- Current team: Altay S.K. U17

Managerial career
- Years: Team
- 2006–2015: Konak Belediyespor
- 2015–: Altay S.K. U17

Hüseyin Tavur (born December 15, 1972) is a Turkish football manager. He is the head coach of the İzmir-based Altay S.K. U17 since the 2015–16 season, which competes in the Turkish Regional Youth Development Under-17 Football League.

== Life and career ==
Hüseyin Tavur was born in Nevşehir, Turkey on December 15, 1972. He is married with Aysun Güzen Tavur.

He was appointed technical director of the women's football team at Konak Belediyespor in 2006. He was instrumental for the success of his team. He brought the team in the 2009–10 Women's League season to the third place, and the next season to the runner-up. He led then the women from İzmir to the league champion title in the 2012–13 season. Konak Belediyespor finished the 2013–14 season again champion, this time unbeaten. He won the 2014–15 league championship with Konak Belediyespor for the third consecutive time after finishing the season undefeated and beating Ataşehir Belediyespor in the play-off game.

His team took part at the 2013–14 UEFA Women's Champions League, and advanced to the Round of 16 as the first ever Turkish club.

For the 2015–16 season, he moved to Altay S.K. to manage their under-17 team in the Turkish Regional Youth Development Under-17 Football League (Turkish: Coca-Cola Bölgesel Gelişim U17 Ligi, BGGL U17).

== Managerial statistics ==
As of April 3, 2016

Team	From	To	Record				
Team	From	To	G	W	D	L	Win %
Konak Belediyespor	2007	2008	12	5	2	5	41.67
Konak Belediyespor	2008	2009	18	6	3	9	33.33
Konak Belediyespor	2009	2010	18	12	0	6	66.67
Konak Belediyespor	2010	2011	22	14	5	3	63.64
Konak Belediyespor	2011	2012	20	10	3	7	50.00
Konak Belediyespor	2012	2013	18	17	0	1	94.44
Konak Belediyespor	2013	2014	20	16	4	0	80.00
Konak Belediyespor	2014	2015	19	17	2	0	89.47
Altay S.K. U-17	2015	2016	21	10	5	6	47.62
Total			168	107	24	37	63.69

== Honours ==
Konak Belediyespor

Turkish Women's First Football League

- Winners (3): 2012–13, 2013–14, 2014–15
- Runners-up (1): 2010–11
- Third place (1): 2009–10
