= Amasya Eğitim Spor =

- Founded: 2011; 15 years ago
- Ground: 12 Haziran Stadium
- Capacity: 12,000
- Coordinates: 40.65300°N 35.81173°E
- League: Turkish Women's First Football League
- 2015–16: 2nd (Second League)

Amasya Eğitim Spor is a women's association football club based in Amasya, Turkey. After finishing the 2015–16 season in the Turkish Women's Second Football League as the runners-up, they were promoted to play in the Women's First League. The team did not show up at any league match of the 2016–17 season, and so were relegated to the Second League.

== Stadium ==
Amasya Eğitim Spor play their home matches at 12 Haziran Stadium (literally: June 12 Stadium) located in the center of Amasya as the city's only stadium. In 1967 built and fully restored between 2012 and 2014, the venue features a natural grass surface and has a seating capacity of 12,000.

== Statistics ==
As of 1 April 2017.

Season	League	Rank	Pld	W	D	L	GF	GA	GD	Pts
2011–12	Second League Div. Black Sea	3	8	4	1	3	27	14	+13	13
2012–13	Second League Div. 3	2	12	8	0	4	49	17	+32	24
2013–14	Second League Div. 3	2	18	14	0	4	103	16	+87	42
2014–15	Second League	3	22	14	2	6	90	26	+64	44
2015–16	Second League	2	22	16	2	4	68	23	+45	50
2016–17	First League	10	18	0	0	18	0	54	−54	−3
Green marks a season followed by promotion, red a season followed by relegation.
