= 2016–17 Turkish Women's First Football League =

Turkish Women's First Football League
- Season: 2016–17
- Matches: 81
- Goals: 318 (3.93 per match)
- Biggest home win: Konak Belediyespor 8–0; Kireçburnu Spor
- All statistics correct as of 2 April 2017.

The 2016–17 season of the Turkish Women's First Football League was the 21st season of Turkey's premier women's football league.

== Teams ==
Location of teams in the 2016–17 season of Turkish Women's First Football League

Season 2016–17
| Team | Hometown | Ground | Capacity | 2015–16 finish |
|---|---|---|---|---|
| 1207 Antalya Döşemealtı Belediye Spor | Antalya | Zeytinköy Football Field | | 4th |
| Adana İdmanyurduspor | Adana | Gençlik Stadium | 2,000 | 7th |
| Amasya Eğitim Spor | Amasya | | | 2nd, 2nd League |
| Ataşehir Belediyespor | Istanbul | Yeni Sahra Stadium | 700 | 2nd |
| Beşiktaş J.K. | Istanbul | Çilekli Football Field | 800 | 1st, 2nd League |
| İlkadım Belediyesi | Samsun | Dereler Football Field | | 8th |
| Kdz. Ereğlispor | Karadeniz Ereğli | Beyçayir Football Field | | 6th |
| Kireçburnu Spor | Istanbul | Çayırbaşı Stadium | 5,000 | 5th |
| Konak Belediyespor | İzmir | Atatürk Stadyum 1 no'lu Yan Saha | | 1st |
| Trabzon İdmanocağı | Trabzon | Yavuz Selim Stadium | 1,820 | 3rd |

== First stage ==
=== Table ===
| Pos | Team | Pld | W | D | L | GF | GA | GD | Pts | Qualification or relegation |
|---|---|---|---|---|---|---|---|---|---|---|
| 1 | Beşiktaş J.K. | 18 | 14 | 0 | 4 | 53 | 14 | +39 | 42 | Play Off |
| 2 | Konak Belediyespor | 18 | 14 | 0 | 4 | 52 | 19 | +33 | 42 | Play Off |
| 3 | Ataşehir Belediyespor (Note: Deducted 6 points) | 18 | 14 | 3 | 1 | 52 | 15 | +37 | 39 | Play Off |
| 4 | 1207 Antalya Döşemealtı Belediye Spor | 18 | 10 | 4 | 4 | 43 | 19 | +24 | 34 | Play Off |
| 5 | Trabzon İdmanocağı | 18 | 10 | 2 | 6 | 40 | 21 | +19 | 32 | Play Off |
| 6 | Kdz. Ereğlispor | 18 | 6 | 3 | 9 | 30 | 37 | −7 | 21 | Play Out |
| 7 | Kireçburnu Spor | 18 | 5 | 3 | 10 | 23 | 47 | −24 | 18 | Play Out |
| 8 | İlkadım Belediyesi | 18 | 4 | 3 | 11 | 17 | 45 | −28 | 15 | Play Out |
| 9 | Adana İdmanyurduspor | 18 | 4 | 0 | 14 | 18 | 57 | −39 | 12 | Play Out |
| 10 | Amasya Eğitim Spor (Note: Deducted 3 points, The team did not show up at any league match of the 2016–17 season, and so were relegated to the Second League) | 18 | 0 | 0 | 18 | 0 | 54 | −54 | −3 | Play Out |

Updated to match(es) played on 2 April 2017. Source: Kadinlar 1. Ligi 2016 - 2017 Sezonu Fikstur ve Puan Cetveli TFF
Rules for classification: 1) Points; 2) head-to-head points; 3) head-to-head goal difference 4) not to declared in default 5) Third match in neutral ground

=== Results ===
| Home \ Away | 1207 | AIY | AES | ATB | BJK | ILK | KDZ | KRC | KOB | TIO |
|---|---|---|---|---|---|---|---|---|---|---|
| 1207 Antalya Döşemealtı Belediye Spor | — | 2–0 | 3–0^{1} | 3–4 | 2–1 | 6–0 | 2–2 | 7–0 | 2–0 | 2–2 |
| Adana İdmanyurduspor | 0–2 | — | 3–0^{1} | 0–3 | 2–5 | 2–0 | 1–5 | 1–4 | 0–3 | 1–4 |
| Amasya Eğitim Spor | 0–3^{2} | 0–3^{2} | — | 0–3^{2} | 0–3^{2} | 0–3^{2} | 0–3^{2} | 0–3^{2} | 0–3^{2} | 0–3^{2} |
| Ataşehir Belediyespor | 1–1 | 6–0 | 3–0^{1} | — | 1–0 | 4–0 | 1–1 | 2–1 | 2–1 | 1–1 |
| Beşiktaş | 1–0 | 6–0 | 3–0^{1} | 0–1 | — | 5–1 | 4–1 | 1–0 | 1–2 | 3–1 |
| İlkadım Belediyesi Yabancılar Pazarı Spor | 1–3 | 2–1 | 3–0^{1} | 0–5 | 1–4 | — | 0–0 | 1–1 | 0–6 | 0–2 |
| Kdz. Ereğlispor | 2–3 | 4–0 | 3–0^{1} | 2–4 | 1–5 | 1–0 | — | 1–0 | 1–5 | 0–1 |
| Kireçburnu Spor | 1–1 | 1–3 | 3–0^{1} | 1–6 | 0–5 | 2–2 | 4–3 | — | 1–2 | 1–0 |
| Konak Belediyespor | 3–1 | 4–0 | 3–0^{1} | 2–1 | 0–4 | 0–3 | 4–0 | 8–0 | — | 4–2 |
| Trabzon İdmanocağı | 1–0 | 6–1 | 3–0^{1} | 2–4 | 1–2 | 3–0 | 3–0 | 4–0 | 1–2 | — |

Updated to match(es) played on 8 April 2017. Source: Kadınlar 1. Ligi 2016 - 2017 Sezonu
Legend: Blue = home team win; Yellow = draw; Red = away team win.

1 - won by default 2 - default

== Second stage ==
For the second stage points won in the first stage were halved.

=== Play Off ===
==== Table ====
| Pos | Team | Pld | W | D | L | GF | GA | GD | Pts | Qualification |
|---|---|---|---|---|---|---|---|---|---|---|
| 1 | Konak Belediyespor | 8 | 6 | 2 | 0 | 26 | 9 | +17 | 41 | Qualification |
| 2 | Beşiktaş J.K. | 8 | 5 | 1 | 2 | 14 | 8 | +6 | 37 | |
| 3 | Ataşehir Belediyespor | 8 | 3 | 2 | 3 | 6 | 9 | −3 | 31 | |
| 4 | Trabzon İdmanocağı | 8 | 2 | 2 | 4 | 11 | 15 | −4 | 24 | |
| 5 | 1207 Antalya Döşemealtı Belediye Spor | 8 | 0 | 1 | 7 | 1 | 17 | −16 | 18 | |

First match(es) will be played: unknown. Source: Kadinlar 1. Ligi 2016 – 2017 Sezonu Fikstur ve Puan Cetveli TFF
Rules for classification: 1) Points; 2) head-to-head points; 3) head-to-head goal difference 4) not to declared in default 5) Third match in neutral ground

==== Results ====
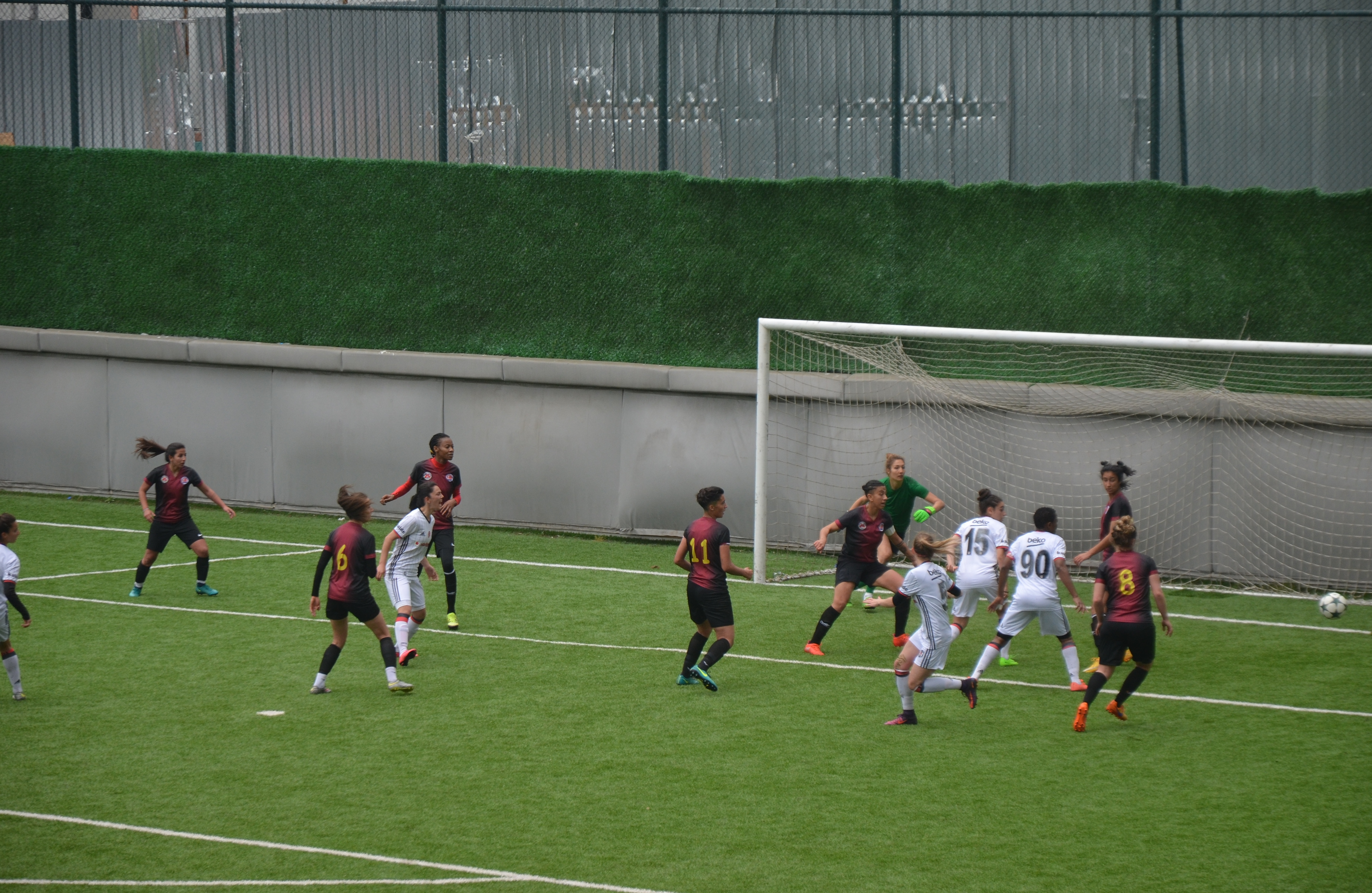
2016–17 season's play-off match between Beşiktaş J.K. (white) and 1207 Antalya Döşemealı Belediyespor (red/blue).

| Home \ Away | 1207 | ATB | BJK | KOB | TIO |
|---|---|---|---|---|---|
| 1207 Antalya Döşemealtı Belediye Spor | — | 0–0 | 0–2 | 0–3 | 1–2 |
| Ataşehir Belediyespor | 1–0 | — | 0–1 | 1–5 | 3–2 |
| Beşiktaş J.K. | 3–0 | 0–1 | — | 2–2 | 1–0 |
| Konak Belediyespor | 4–0 | 1–0 | 5–1 | — | 4–4 |
| Trabzon İdmanocağı | 2–0 | 0–0 | 0–4 | 1–2 | — |

First match(es) will be played: unknown. Source: Kadınlar 1. Lig Fikstür ve Puan Cetveli
Legend: Blue = home team win; Yellow = draw; Red = away team win.

=== Play Out ===
==== Table ====
| Pos | Team | Pld | W | D | L | GF | GA | GD | Pts | Relegation |
|---|---|---|---|---|---|---|---|---|---|---|
| 1 | İlkadım Belediyesi | 8 | 7 | 1 | 0 | 21 | 3 | +18 | 30 | |
| 2 | Kdz. Ereğlispor | 8 | 4 | 1 | 3 | 21 | 13 | +8 | 24 | |
| 3 | Kireçburnu Spor | 8 | 4 | 1 | 3 | 18 | 15 | +3 | 22 | |
| 4 | Adana İdmanyurduspor | 8 | 3 | 1 | 4 | 16 | 21 | −5 | 16 | Relegation |
| 5 | Amasya Eğitim Spor | 8 | 0 | 0 | 8 | 0 | 24 | −24 | −1 | Relegation |

First match(es) will be played: unknown. Source: Kadinlar 1. Ligi 2016 – 2017 Sezonu Fikstur ve Puan Cetveli TFF
Rules for classification: 1) Points; 2) head-to-head points; 3) head-to-head goal difference 4) not to declared in default 5) Third match in neutral ground

==== Results ====
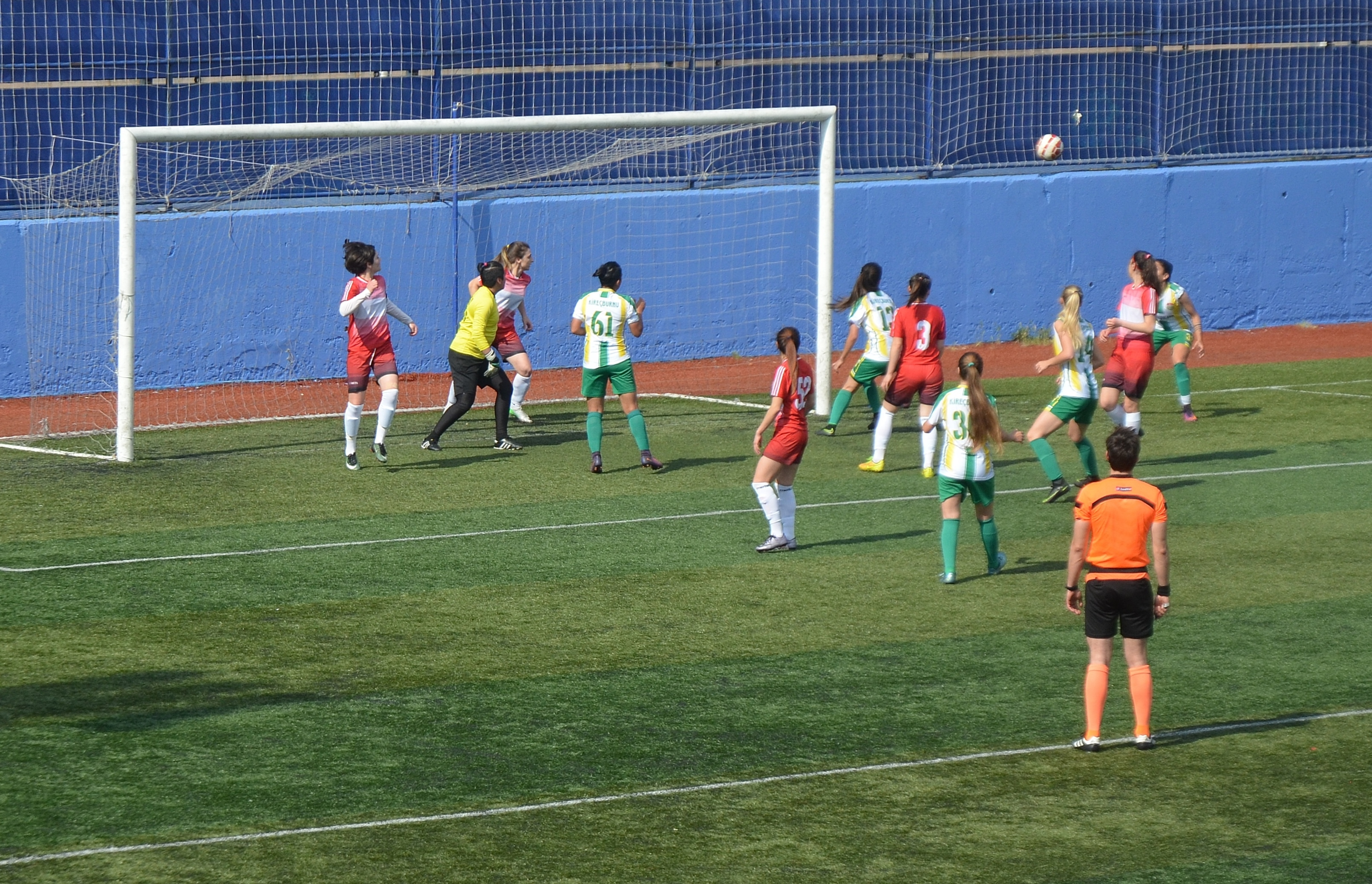
2016-17 season's play-out match between Kireçburnu Spor (white(green) and İlkadım Belediyespor (red).

| Home \ Away | AIY | AES | ILK | KDZ | KRC |
|---|---|---|---|---|---|
| Adana İdmanyurduspor | — | 3–0 | 0–1 | 2–2 | 4–2 |
| Amasya Eğitim Spor | 0–3 | — | 0–3 | 0–3 | 0–3 |
| İlkadım Belediyesi | 5–0 | 3–0 | — | 2–0 | 1–1 |
| Kdz. Ereğlispor | 6–2 | 3–0 | 2–3 | — | 3–1 |
| Kireçburnu Spor | 5–2 | 3–0 | 0–3 | 3–2 | — |

First match(es) will be played: unknown. Source: Kadınlar 1. Lig Fikstür ve Puan Cetveli
Legend: Blue = home team win; Yellow = draw; Red = away team win.

== Topscorers ==
| Rank | Player | Club | Goals |
|---|---|---|---|
| 1 | (Turkey) Sevgi Çınar | Konak Belediyespor | 24 |
| 2 | (Turkey) Kader Hançar | Ataşehir Belediyespor | 17 |
| 3 | (Georgia (country)) Teona Bakradze | Kdz. Ereğlispor | 16 |
| 4 | (Colombia) Oriánica Velásquez | 1207 Antalya Döşemealtı Belediye Spor | 14 |
| 4 | (Turkey) Yağmur Uraz | Ataşehir Belediyespor | 14 |
| 6 | (Nigeria) Esther Sunday | Konak Belediyespor | 13 |
| 7 | (Turkey) Arzu Karabulut | Trabzon İdmanocağı | 12 |
| 8 | (Turkey) Ece Türkoğlu | Kdz. Ereğlispor | 11 |
| 9 | (Cameroon) Jacquette Ada | Beşiktaş J.K. | 10 |
| 9 | (Ivory Coast) Ines Nrehy | Beşiktaş J.K. | 10 |
| 11 | (Romania) Cosmina Dușa | Kınak Belediyespor | 9 |
| 11 | (Turkey) Müzeyyen Dilek Özbiler | İlkadım Belediyesi Yabancılar Pazarı Spor | 9 |

== Hat-tricks ==
| Player | For | Against | Result | Date |
|---|---|---|---|---|
| (Turkey) Kader Hançar | Ataşehir Belediyespor | İlkadım Belediyesi Spor | 5-0 | 29 January 2017 |
| (Colombia) Oriánica Velásquez | 1207 Antalya Spor | Kireçburnu Spor | 7-0 | 19 February 2017 |
| (Turkey) Selin Sivrikaya | Kireçburnu Spor | Kdz. Ereğli Belediye Spor | 4-3 | 23 February 2017 |
| (Nigeria) Esther Sunday | Konak Belediyespor | Kireçburnu Spor | 8-0 | 11 March 2017 |
| (Georgia (country)) Teona Bakradze | Kdz. Ereğli Belediye Spor | Adana İdmanyurduspor | 6-2 | 25 April 2017 |
| (Turkey) Ece Türkoğlu | Kdz. Ereğli Belediye Spor | Adana İdmanyurduspor | 6-2 | 25 April 2017 |
| (Ivory Coast) Ines Nrehy | Beşiktaş J.K. | Trabzon İdmanocağı | 4-0 | 24 May 2017 |
