= Ujunwa Okafor =

Nigerian footballer

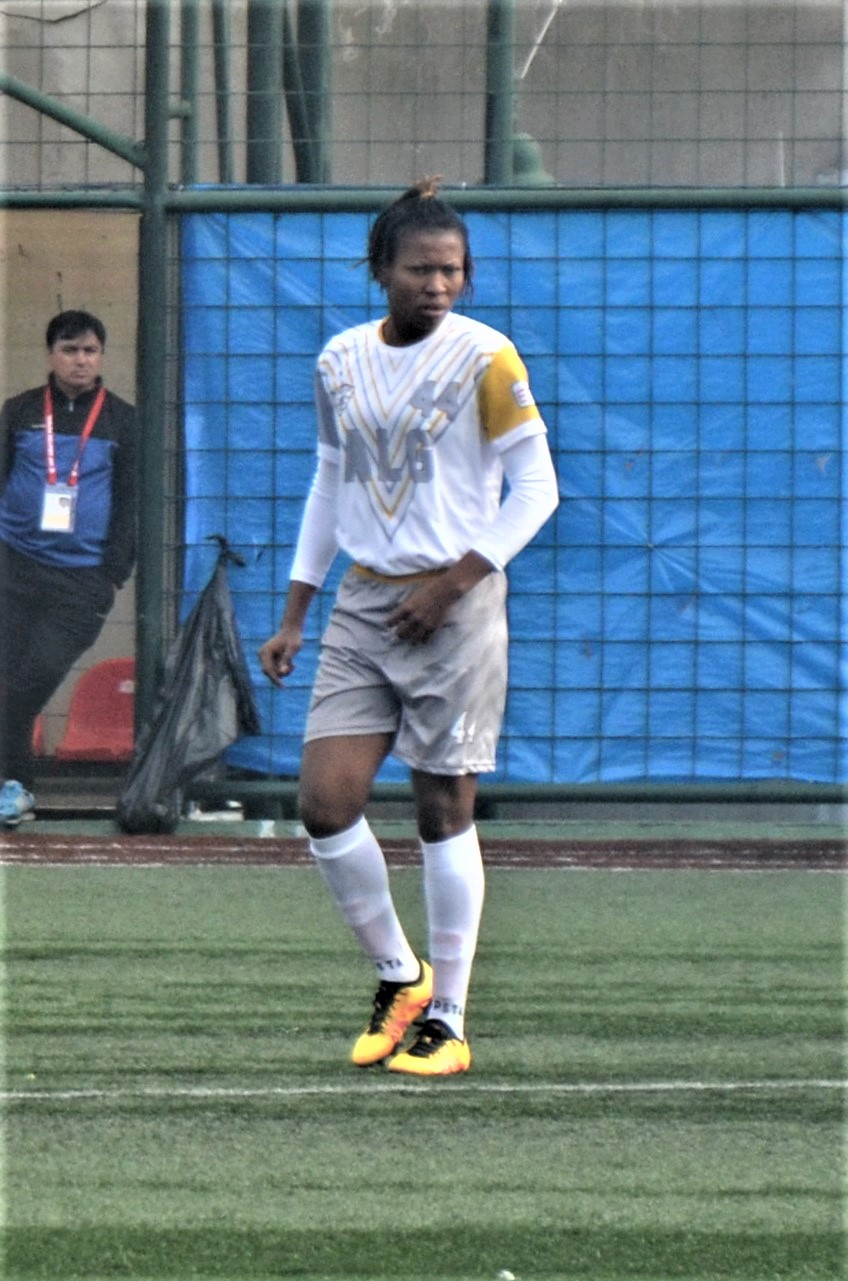
- Ujunwa Eucharia Okafor for ALG Spor (November 2018)

Personal information
- Full name: Ujunwa Eucharia Okafor
- Date of birth: 20 December 1992 (age 33)
- Place of birth: Asaba, Nigeria
- Position: Defender

Senior career*
| Years | Team | Apps | (Gls) |
| 2018–2019 | ALG Spor | 5 | (0) |
- * Club domestic league appearances and goals as of April 13, 2018

Ujunwa Eucharia Okafor (born 20 December 1992) is a Nigerian footballer who plays as a defender. She played for ALG Spor in the Turkish Women's First Football League with jersey number 44. In 2018, she was called up to the Nigeria women's national team.

== Playing career ==
=== Club ===
Okafor played in her country in the Nigeria Women Premier League for Delta Queens F.C., before she moved to Turkey, and joined the recently to the Women's First league promoted club ALG Spor in Gaziantep.

=== International ===
In February 2018, Okafor was called up to the Nigeria women's national team for their participation at the 2018 WAFU Nations Cup.

== Career statistics ==
As of match played April 13, 2018.

| Club | Season | League | | | Continental | | National | | Total | |
| Club | Season | Division | Apps | Goals | Apps | Goals | Apps | Goals | Apps | Goals |
|---|---|---|---|---|---|---|---|---|---|---|
| ALG Spor | 2018–19 | First League | 5 | 0 | – | – | 0 | 0 | 5 | 0 |
| ALG Spor | Total | | 5 | 0 | – | – | 0 | 0 | 5 | 0 |

== Honours ==
Turkish Women's First League

ALG Spor
Runners-up (1): 2018–19
