= Zehra Borazancı =

Turkish-Cypriot footballer (born 1989)

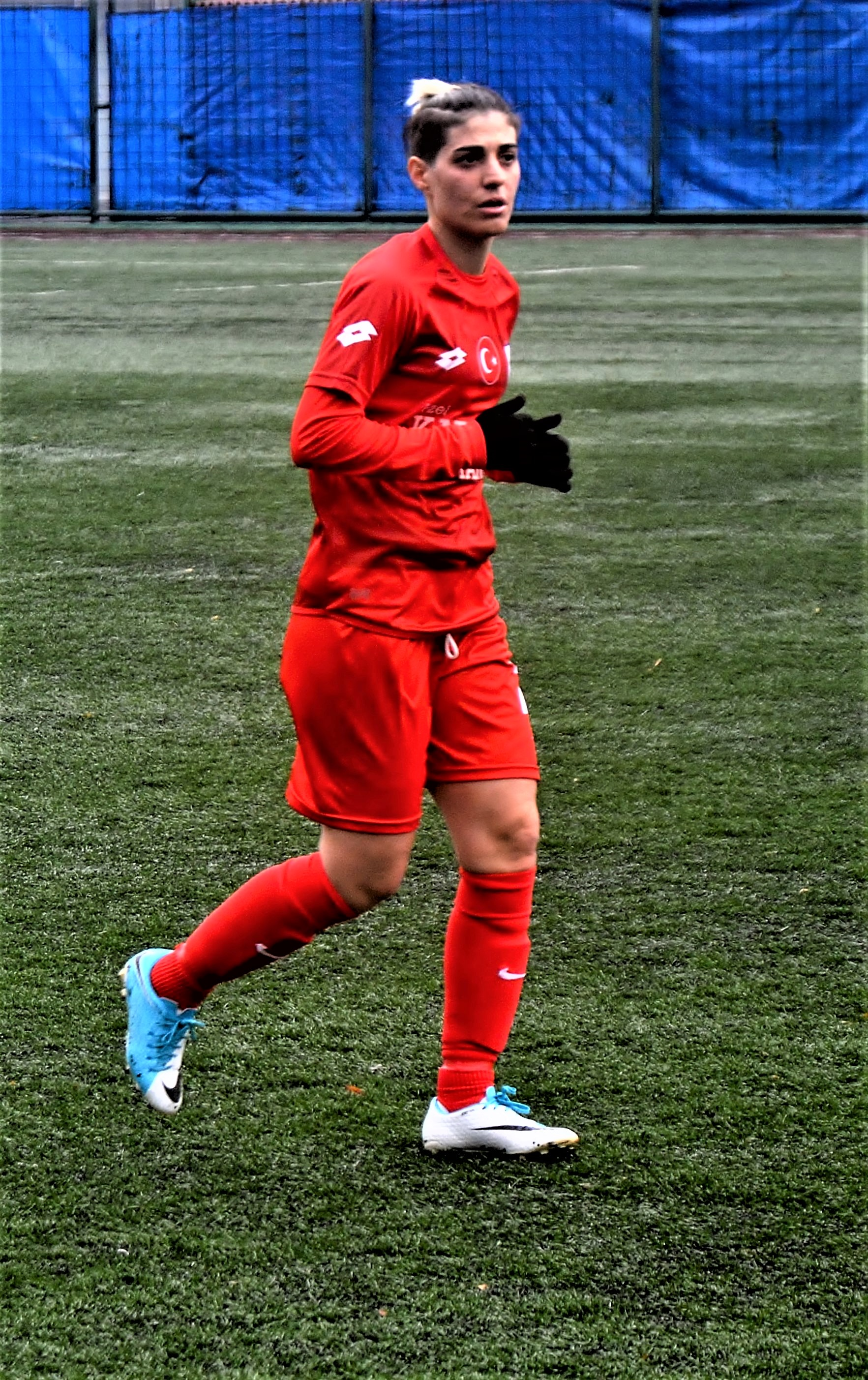
- Zehra Borazancı for Konak Belediyespor (December 2017)

Personal information
- Date of birth: September 16, 1989 (age 37)
- Place of birth: Famagusta, Northern Cyprus
- Position: Midfielder

Team information
- Current team: Gaziantespor

Senior career*
Years	Team	Apps	(Gls)
2008–2011	Akdeniz Spor Birliği		
2011–2012	Istanbul Nurçelik	12	(4)
2012–2013	Adana İdmanyurduspor	11	(1)
2013–2014	AGE Rotterdam		
2014–2017	Adana İdmanyurduspor	35	(1)
2017–2018	Konak	20	(0)
2018	Ataşehir	0	(0)
2018–2019	ALG	16	(3)
2019–2020	Kireçburnu	8	(3)
2020	1207 Antalyaspor	2	(3)
2020–21	Fomget	6	(3)
2021–	ALG	73	(2)
2024	Beylerbeyi	4	(0)
2026	Gaziantespor	4	(0)
- * Club domestic league appearances and goals

Zehra Borazancı (born September 16, 1989) is a Turkish-Cypriot women's footballer who plays as a midfielder in the Turkish Super League for Gaziantespor. She is also a successful international football tennis player for her country.

== Personal life ==
Zehra Borazancı was born in Famagusta, Northern Cyprus, on September 16, 1989.

== Football career ==
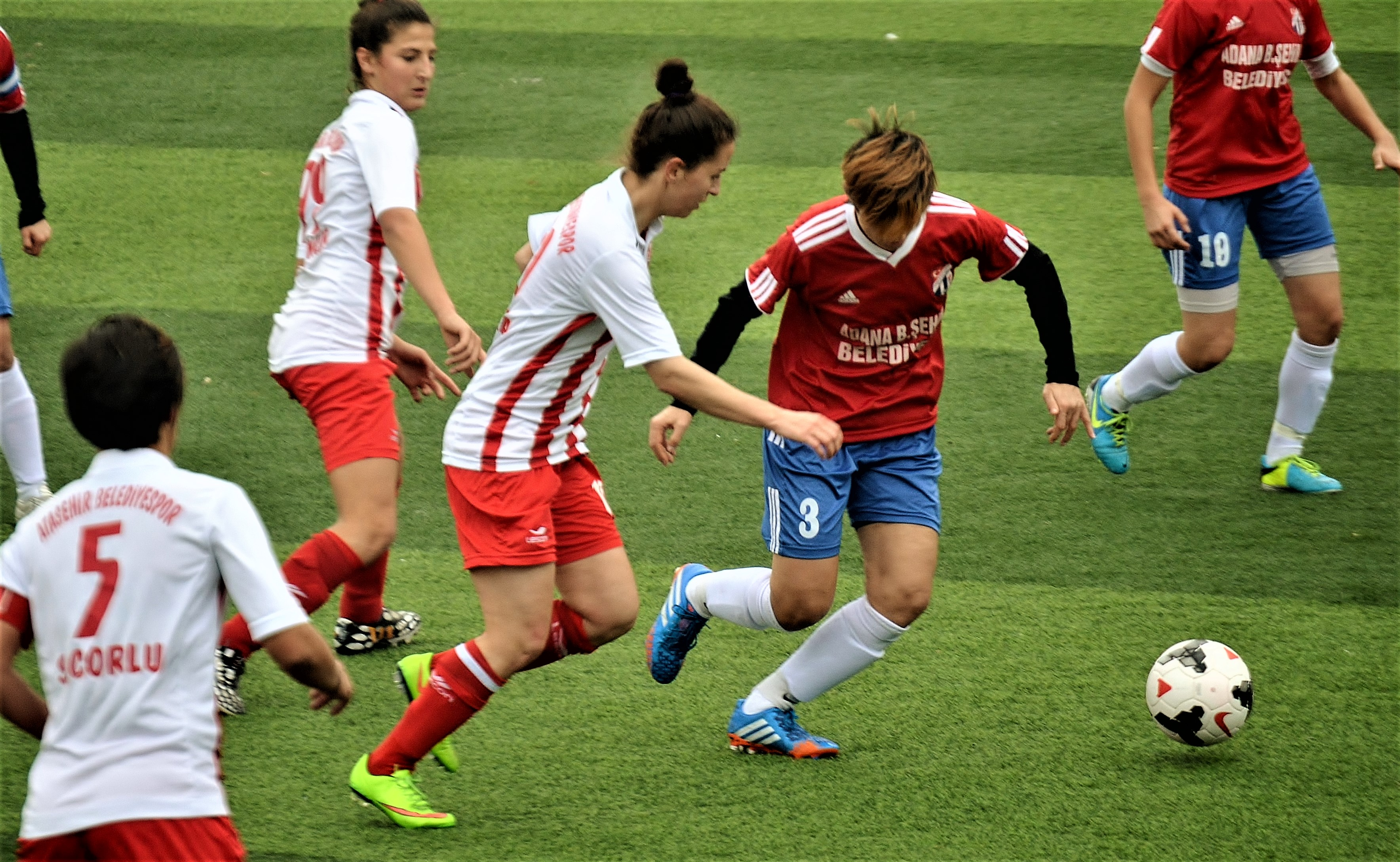
Zehra Borazancı (red/blue) of Adana İdmanyurduspor challenging an attack of Ataşehir Belediyespor in the 2014–15 Turkish Women's First League

Borazancı began playing football at a very young age. She played in her country Northern Cyprus for the Kyrenia (Turkish: Girne)-based sports club Akdeniz Spor Birliği in the Women's League organized by the Cyprus Turkish Football Association (KTFF) between 2008 and 2012. She enjoyed her team's champion title in four seasons in a row, and became top scorer with 14 goals in 2010.

In 2012, she played for Girne American University at the Northern Cyprus Inter-University Women's Football and Futsal Championship, and enjoyed her team's champion title.

She moved to Turkey, and obtained her Turkish license from Akdeniz Nurçelk Spor on December 2, 2011. She played the 2011–12 season in the Turkish Women's Second League for Istanbul Nurçelik Spor. The next season, she was transferred by Adana İdmanyurduspor, which played in the Women's First League. After one season, Borazancı went to the Netherlands, and signed with AGE Rotterdam playing in the Durch Women's Second League. At the end of the season, she returned to her former club Adana Idmanyurduspor, where she played two full seasons. In the second half of the 2016–17 season, she moved to the İzmir-based successful club Konak Belediyespor. She enjoyed her first Turkish Keague champion title with Konak Belediyespor, which became the fifth time champion in a row.

Borazancı made her international debut with Konak Belediyespor in the 2017–18 UEFA Women's Champions League qualifying round – Group 1 match against WFC Martve in Tbilisi, Georgia on August 22, 2017. She took part in three matches of the tournament.

Borzancı signed with the Istanbul-based club Ataşehir Belediyespor before the club's participation at the 2018–19 UEFA Women's Champions League qualifying round. She played in two of the three matches of the qualification round.

In October 2018, she joined the Gaziantep-based club ALG Spor, which were promoted to the Women's First Leagıe in the 2018–19 season. By October 2019, she transferred to Kireçburnu Spor in Istanbul. After playing 8 games and scoring three goals in the first half of the 2019–20 First League season, she moved to 1207 Antalyaspor to play in the Second League.

Borazancı transferred to the Ankara-based Fomget Gençlik ve Spor in the 2020–21 Turkcell Women's Football League.

In June 2021, she joined her former club ALG Spor to play in the Turkish Women's Super League. She enjoyed the 2021–22 Women's Super League champion title of her team. On 18 August 2022, she played in the 2022–23 UEFA Women's Champions League.

In the 2024–25 Turkish Super League season, she joined Beylerbeyi in Istanbul.

== Football tennis career ==
Borzancı took part at the 11th World Footballtennis Championship 2014 held in North Nicosia representing her country Northern Cyprus, and became runners-up in the Women's single event. In 2015, she became silver medalist with her teammate Gizem Yahat in the Women's double event at the European Football Tennis Championship in Târgoviște, Romania. As part of the Northern Cyprus women's national football team, she participated at the 2016 FIFTA World Football Tennis Cup held in Northern Cyprus, she placed the third rank in the Women's double event with her teammate Ayşe Mullacuma. In 2017, Borazancı was a member of her country's team at the 2017 European Football Tennis Championship held in Bucharest, Romania.

== Career statistics ==
Club	Season	League			Continental		National		Total	
Club	Season	Division	Apps	Goals	Apps	Goals	Apps	Goals	Apps	Goals
Akdeniz Spor Birliği	2008–2011	Cyprus Turkish League			–	–	–	–		
Akdeniz Spor Birliği	Total				–	–	–	–		
Istanbul Nurçelik Spor	2011–12	Turkish Second League	12	4	–	–	–	–	12	4
Istanbul Nurçelik Spor	Total		12	4	–	–	–	–	12	4
Adana İdmanyurduspor	2012–13	Turkish First League	11	1			–	–	11	1
AGE Rotterdam	2013–14	Dutch Second League					–	–		
Adana İdmanyurduspor	2014–15	Turkish First League	16	0	–	–	–	–	16	0
Adana İdmanyurduspor	2015–16	Turkish First League	12	0	–	–	–	–	12	0
Adana İdmanyurduspor	2016–17	Turkish First League	7	1	–	–	–	–	7	1
Adana İdmanyurduspor	Total		35	1			–	–	35	1
Konak Belediyespor	2016–17	Turkish First League	13	0	0	0	–	–	13	0
Konak Belediyespor	2017–18	Turkish First League	7	0	3	0	–	–	10	0
Konak Belediyespor	Total		20	0	3	0	–	–	23	0
Ataşehir Belediyespor	2018–19	Turkish First League	0	0	2	0	–	–	2	0
ALG	2018–19	Turkish First League	16	3	0	0	–	–	16	3
Kireçburnu Spor	2019–20	Turkish First League	8	3	0	0	–	–	8	3
1207 Antalyaspor	2019–20	Turkish Second League	2	3	0	0	–	–	2	3
Fomget	2020–21	Turkish First Keague	6	3	0	0	–	–	6	3
ALG	2021–22	Turkish Super League	25	1	0	0	–	–	25	1
ALG	2022–23	Super League	19	1	1	0	–	–	20	1
ALG	2023–24	Super League	29	0	0	0	–	–	29	0
ALG	Total		73	2	1	0	–	–	74	2
Beylerbeyi	2024–25	Turkish Super League	4	0	0	0	–	–	4	0
Gaziante	2026-27	Turkish Super League	4	0					4	0
Total career			191	20	6	0			197	20

== Honours ==
Turkish Women's First League

Konak Belediyespor
Winners (1): 2016–17
ALG Spor
Runners-up (1): 2018–19, 2021–22
