= Fatoş Yıldırım =

Turkish footballer (born 1994)

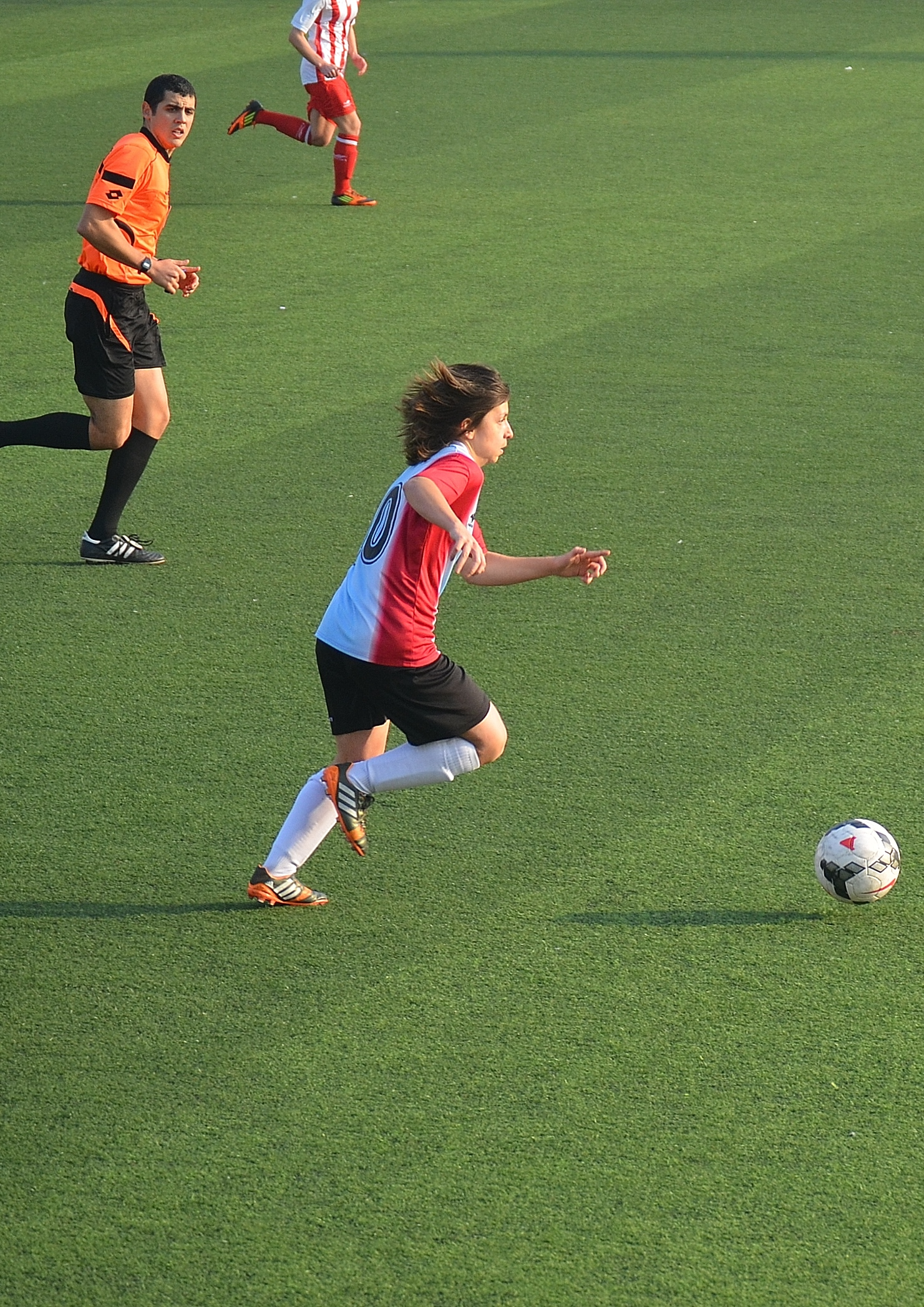
- Fatoş Yıldırım for Trabzon İdmanocağı in 2014

Personal information
- Date of birth: March 28, 1994 (age 32)
- Place of birth: Turgutlu, Manisa, Turkey
- Position: Midfielder

Team information
- Current team: Fenerbahçe
- Number: 23

Senior career*
Years	Team	Apps	(Gls)
2008–2010	Turgutlu Belediyespor	26	(20)
2010–2011	Gölcükspor	21	(5)
2011–2017	Trabzon İdmanocağı	105	(29)
2017–2018	Konak Belediyespor	19	(3)
2018–2020	ALG Spor	26	(4)
2020–2021	Ataşehir Belediyespor	9	(0)
2021–2024	Ankara BB Fomget	32	(5)
2024–	Fenerbahçe	3	(0)

International career^{‡}
2009	Turkey U-17	3	(0)
2011–2012	Turkey U-19	20	(1)
2020–	Turkey	3	(0)
- * Club domestic league appearances and goals as of 10:18, 20 May 2026 (UTC) ‡ National team caps and goals as of 23 February 2022

Fatoş Yıldırım (born March 28, 1994) is a Turkish women's footballer who plays as a midfielder in the Super League for Fenerbahçe. In 2013, she was called up to the Turkish national team.

== Early life ==
Fatoş Yıldırım was born in Turgutlu district of Manisa Province on March 28, 1994. She began playing football at a very young age in her local neighbourhood.

== Club career ==
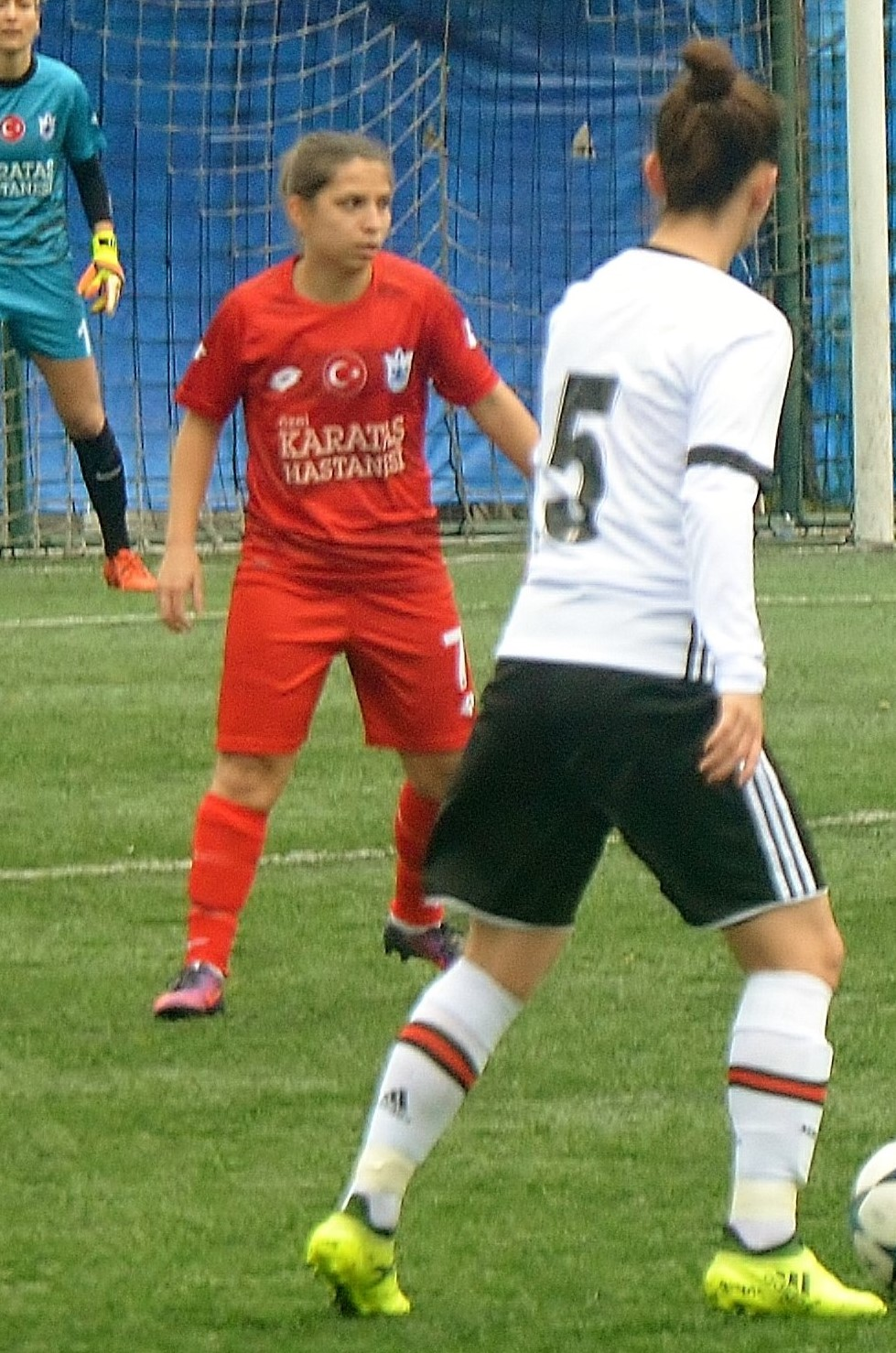
Fatoş Yıldırım (red) playing for Konak Belediyespor against Beşiktaş J.K. in the 2017–18 season's away match.

She received her license on May 30, 2008, for her hometown club Turgutlu Belediyespor. In the beginning of the 2010–11 season, she transferred to Gölcükspor, where she played only one season. Since November 2011, she has been with Trabzon İdmanocağı.

After six seasons, she transferred to the İzmir-based club Konak Belediyespor in August 2017. She debuted at the UEFA Women's Champions League and played in three games of the 2017–18 qualifying round in Tbilisi, Georgia.

After one season with Konak Belediyespor, she moved to Gaziantep to join the recently promoted club ALG Spor in the Women's First League.

For the second half of the 2019-20 Women's First League season, she transferred to Ataşehir Belediyespor in Istanbul.

She signed with the Ankara-based Fomget Gençlik ve Spor in the 2021-22 Women's Super League.

== International career ==
Fatoş Yıldırım was called up to the Turkey girls' U-17 team, and debuted in the friendly match against Bulgaria on June 27, 2009. She cappen three times for the Turkey U-17 nationals.

She appeared in twenty games for the Turkey women's U-19 team, and scored one goal in the friendly match against Hungary.

== Career statistics ==
As of 5 November 2022.

Club	Season	League			Continental		National		Total	
Club	Season	Division	Apps	Goals	Apps	Goals	Apps	Goals	Apps	Goals
Turgutlu Belediyespor	2008–09	Second League	8	6	–	–	1	0	9	6
Turgutlu Belediyespor	2009–10	First League	18	14	–	–	2	0	20	14
Turgutlu Belediyespor	Total		26	20	–	–	3	0	29	20
Gölcükspor	2010–11	First League	21	5	–	–	0	0	21	5
Gölcükspor	Total		21	5	–	–	0	0	21	5
Trabzon İdmanocağı	2011–12	First League	21	8	–	–	15	1	36	9
Trabzon İdmanocağı	2012–13	First League	18	5	–	–	5	0	23	5
Trabzon İdmanocağı	2013–14	First League	12	0	–	–	0	0	12	0
Trabzon İdmanocağı	2014–15	First League	16	7	–	–	0	0	16	7
Trabzon İdmanocağı	2015–16	First League	17	6	–	–	0	0	17	6
Trabzon İdmanocağı	2016–17	First League	21	3	–	–	0	0	21	3
Trabzon İdmanocağı	Total		105	29	–	–	20	1	125	30
Konak Belediyespor	2017–18	First League	19	3	3	0	0	0	22	3
Konak Belediyespor	Total		19	3	3	0	0	0	22	3
ALG Spor	2018–19	First League	17	3	0	0	0	0	17	3
ALG Spor	2019–20	First League	9	1	0	0	0	0	9	1
ALG Spor	Total		26	4	0	0	0	0	26	4
Ataşehir Belediyespor	2019–20	First League	5	0	0	0	0	0	5	0
Ataşehir Belediyespor	2020–21	First League	4	0	0	0	1	0	5	0
Ataşehir Belediyespor	Total		9	0	0	0	1	0	10	0
Ankara BB Fomget GS	2021–22	Super League	4	4	0	0	2	0	6	4
Ankara BB Fomget GS	2022–23	Super League	4	0	0	0	0	0	4	0
Ankara BB Fomget GS	Total		8	4	0	0	2	0	10	4
Career total			214	65	3	0	26	1	243	66

== Honours ==
Turkish Women's First League

Trabzon İdmanocağı
Third places (2): 2011–12, 2014–15

Konak Belediyespor
Third places (1): 2017–18

ALG Spor
Runners-up (1): 2018–19

Fenerbahçe
Winners (1): 2025–26
