= Aslı Canan Sabırlı =

Turkish women's footballer

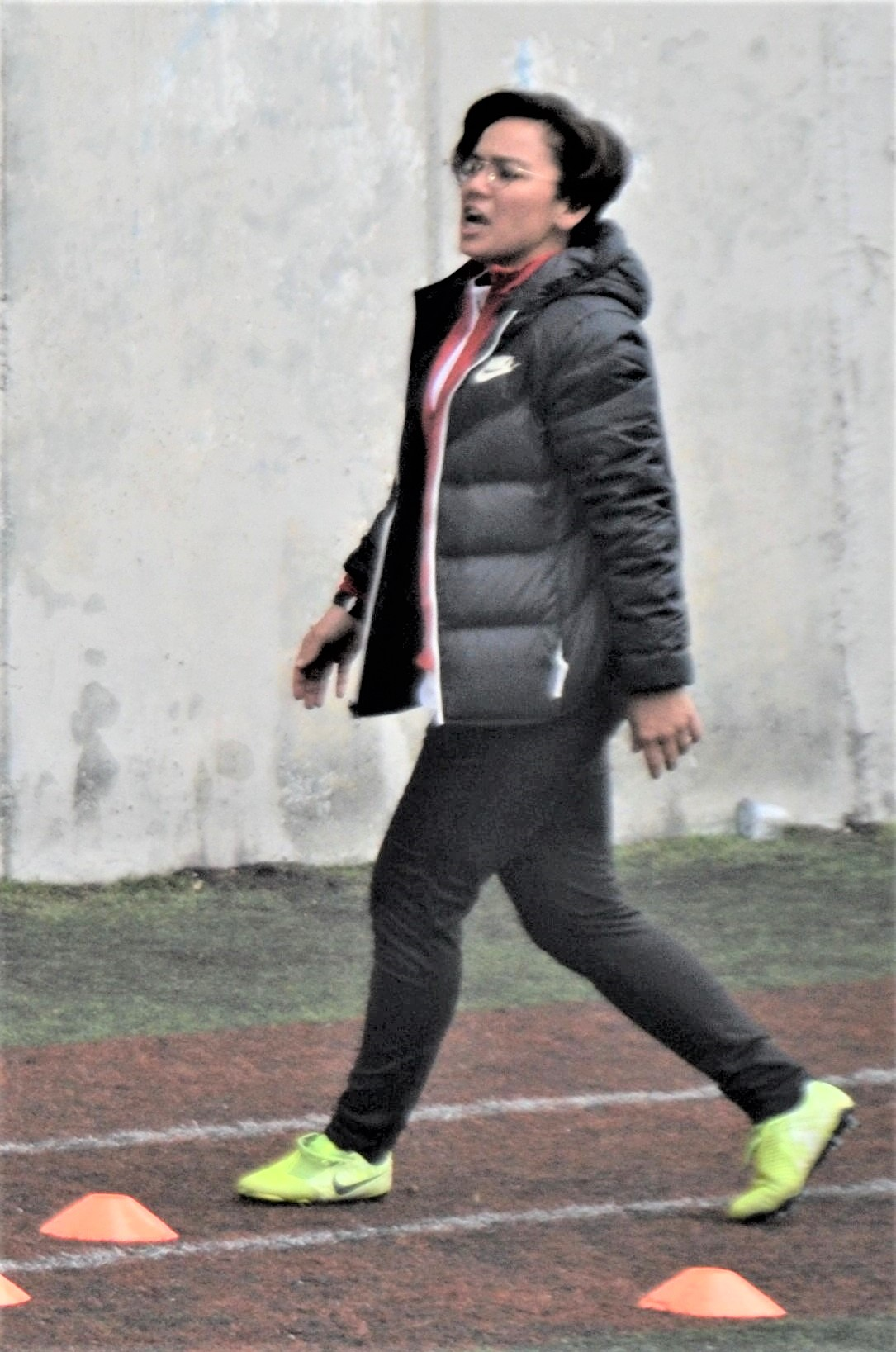
- Aslı Canan Sabırlı of ALG Spor (December 2019)

Personal information
- Date of birth: 13 September 1991 (age 35)
- Place of birth: Seyhan, Adana, Turkey
- Position: Defender

Senior career*
Years	Team	Apps	(Gls)
2008–2011	Adana İdmanyurduspor	48	(9)
2011–2013	Konak Belediyespor	18	(1)
2013–2014	Kayseri Gençlik Birliği	16	(15)
2014–2015	Yahya Mazlum HEM Spor	15	(42)
2015–2016	Osmaniye Demirspor	28	(12)
2016–2018	Adana İdmanyurduspor	17	(8)
2018	ALG Spor	11	(4)

International career^{‡}
2007	Turkey U17	7	(1)
2006–2010	Turkey U19	24	(0)

Managerial career
- 2018–19: ALG Spor
- 2022–: Adana İdman Yurdu
- * Club domestic league appearances and goals ‡ National team caps and goals as of 15 February 2010

Aslı Canan Sabırlı (born 13 September 1991) is a Turkish women's footballer, who serves as a football manager, and played as a defender. She was a member of the Turkey girls' national under-17 and under-19 teams.

== Early life ==
Aslı Canan Sabırlı was born in Seyhan district of Adana Province, southern Turkey on 13 September 1991. She was educated at Aksaray University.

== Club career ==
Sabırlı obtained her license from Adana İdmanyurduspor in her hometown on 25 January 2015. She started to play in the team in the 2008–09 Turkish Women's Second Football League, and enjoyed her team's promotion to the First League at the end of the season. In the 2011–12 First League season, she transferred to the İzmir-based Konak Belediyespor. Her team became champion in the 2012–13 First League season. The next season, she played for Kayseri Gençlik Birliği in the Second League. In the 2014–15 season, Sabırlı joined the Third League-club Yahya Mazlum Halk Eğitim Merkezi Spor in Osmaniye. She scored 42 goals in 15 league games. She netted five goals of a match with 13–0 win, made a hat-trick in a match with 8–0 win, ten goals in a match with 18–0 win, eight goals in a match with 10–0 win, a hat-trick in a match with 12–0 win, and nine goals of a match with 22–0 win. In the next season, she played in the Second League for Osmaniye Demirspor. She left the team after the first half of the 2016–17 season, and returned to her former club Adana İdmanyurduspor, which had troubles to remain in the First League. Despite efforts, Adana İdmanyurduspor was relegated to the Second League. In the second half of the 2016–17 season, she joined the Gaziantep-based club ALG Spor in the Second League, which were recently promoted from the Third League. She served as captain of her team. At the end of the season, she enjoyed her team's promotion to the First League. The team became even league leader shortly before the end of the season. At the end of the 2018–19 season, at which she remained on the substitute bench, her team became runner-up losing the champion title in the play-off match.

== International career ==
Sabırlı was admitted to the Turkey women's U-19 team debuting in a friendly match against North Macedonia on 22 January 2006, before she became a member of the national girls' U-17 team. With the girls' U-17 team, she took part in two games of the 2008 UEFA Women's Under-17 Championship – Group 6, and scored one goal against Moldova girls' U-17 team. She capped in seven matches in total for the U-17 team.

She played at the 2007 UEFA Women's Under-19 Championship First qualifying round, 2008 UEFA Women's Under-19 Championship First qualifying round, 2009 UEFA Women's Under-19 Championship – Group 2, 2009 Kuban Spring Tournament, and 2010 UEFA Women's U-19 Championship First qualifying round – Group 7 matches. She capped 24 times in total.

In 2007, it was reported that Sabırlı was selected to represent Turkey to play at the Coca-Cola World Women's Football Tournament held in Brazil on 29 July 2007.

International goals
Date	Venue	Opponent	Result	Competition	Scored
24 October 2007	Topkapı Palace Antalya, Turkey	Moldova	W 7–0	2008 UEFA Women's Under-17 Championship – Group 6	1

== Club career statistics ==
As of 15 April 2018.

Club	Season	League			Continental		National		Total	
Club	Season	Division	Apps	Goals	Apps	Goals	Apps	Goals	Apps	Goals
Adana İdmanyurduspor	2006–08	Second League	0	0	–	–	17	1	17	1
Adana İdmanyurduspor	2008–09	Second League	8	5	–	–	12	0	20	5
Adana İdmanyurduspor	2009–10	First League	18	2	–	–	2	0	20	2
Adana İdmanyurduspor	2010–11	First League	22	2	–	–	0	0	22	2
Adana İdmanyurduspor	Total		48	9	–	–	31	1	79	10
Konak Belediyespor	2011–12	First League	13	1	–	–	0	0	13	1
Konak Belediyespor	2012–13	First League	5	0	–	–	0	0	5	0
Konak Belediyespor	Total		18	1	–	–	0	0	18	1
Kayseri Gençlik Birliği	2013–14	Second League	16	15	–	–	0	0	16	15
Kayseri Gençlik Birliği	Total		16	15	–	–	0	0	16	15
Yahya Mazlum HEM Spor	2014–15	Third League	15	42	–	–	0	0	15	42
Yahya Mazlum HEM Spor	Total		15	42	–	–	0	0	15	42
Osmaniye Demirspor	2015–16	Second League	18	12	–	–	0	0	18	12
Osmaniye Demirspor	2016–17	Second League	10	0	–	–	0	0	10	0
Osmaniye Demirspor	Total		28	12	–	–	0	0	28	12
Adana İdmanyurduspor	2016–17	First League	11	6	–	–	0	0	11	6
Adana İdmanyurduspor	2017–18	Second League	6	2	–	–	0	0	6	2
Adana İdmanyurduspor	Total		17	8	–	–	0	0	17	8
ALG Spor	2017–18	Second League	11	4	–	–	0	0	11	4
ALG Spor	Total		11	4	–	–	0	0	11	4
Career total			153	91	–	–	31	1	184	92

== Futsal career ==
Sabırlı played also futsal during her university years at Aksaray University.

== Managerial career ==
Sabırlı was appointed technical director of ALG Spor's women's team in the 2018–19 Women's First League season, in addition to her squad membership.

By end of 2021, she was tasked with the trainer position of Gaziantepgücü Spor youth team. In April 2022, women's club of Adana İdman Yurdu appointed her as technical director and later as trainer in the 2022–23 Super League season.

== Honours ==
Turkish Women's First League

Konak belediyespor
Winners (1): 2012–13

ALG Spor
Runners-up (1): 2018–19

Turkish Women's Second League

Adana İdmanyurduspor
Winners (1): 2008–09

ALG Spor
Winners (1): 2017–18
