= Remziye Bakır =

Turkish footballer (born 1997)

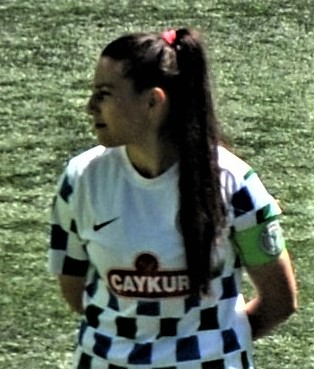
- Remziye Bakır of Çaykur Rizespor (2022)

Personal information
- Date of birth: 22 February 1997 (age 29)
- Place of birth: Siverek, Şanlıurfa, Turkey
- Position: Midfielder

Team information
- Current team: Çaykur Rizespor
- Number: 14

Senior career*
Years	Team	Apps	(Gls)
2011–2012	Gazi Üniversitesisporr	10	(3)
2012–2015	Fomget G.S.	47	(18)
2016–2018	Amed S.K.	23	(6)
2018–2019	ALG Spor	20	(4)
2019–2020	Amed S.K.	14	(1)
2021	Fomget G.S.	5	(2)
2021–	Çaykur Rizespor	2	(0)

International career
2014–2015	Turkey U-19	28	(1)
- * Club domestic league appearances and goals as of 29 December 20225

Remziye Bakır (born 22 February 1997) is a Turkish women's football midfielder, who plays for the Turkish Women's Super League club Çaykur Rizespor with jersey number 14. She was a member of the Turkey women's U-19 team

== Early life ==
Remziye Bakır was born in Siverek town of Şanlıurfa Province, southeastern Turkey on 22 February 1997.

== Club career ==
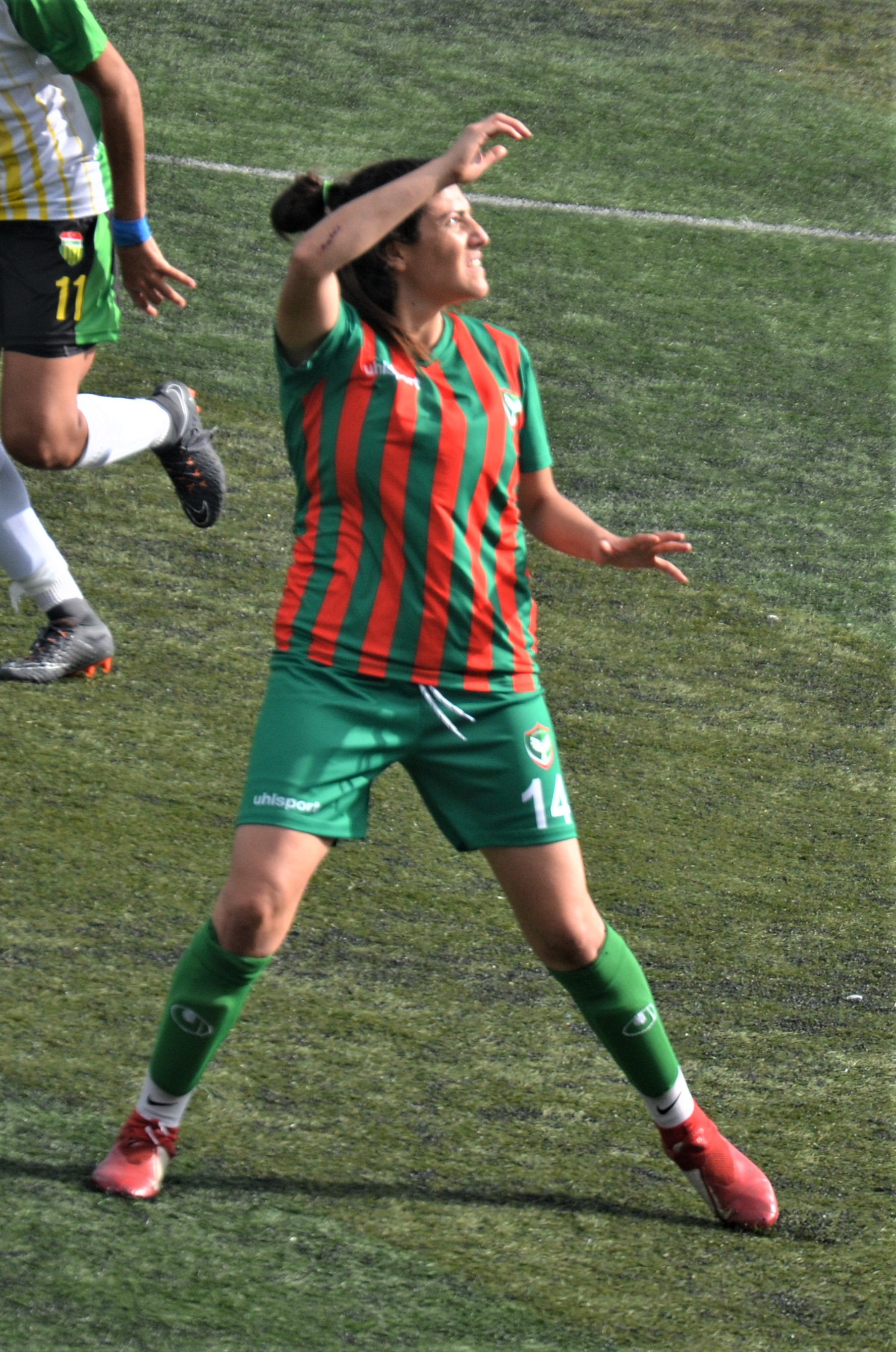
Remziye Bakır of Amed S.K. in the 2019-20 Turkish Women's First Football League.

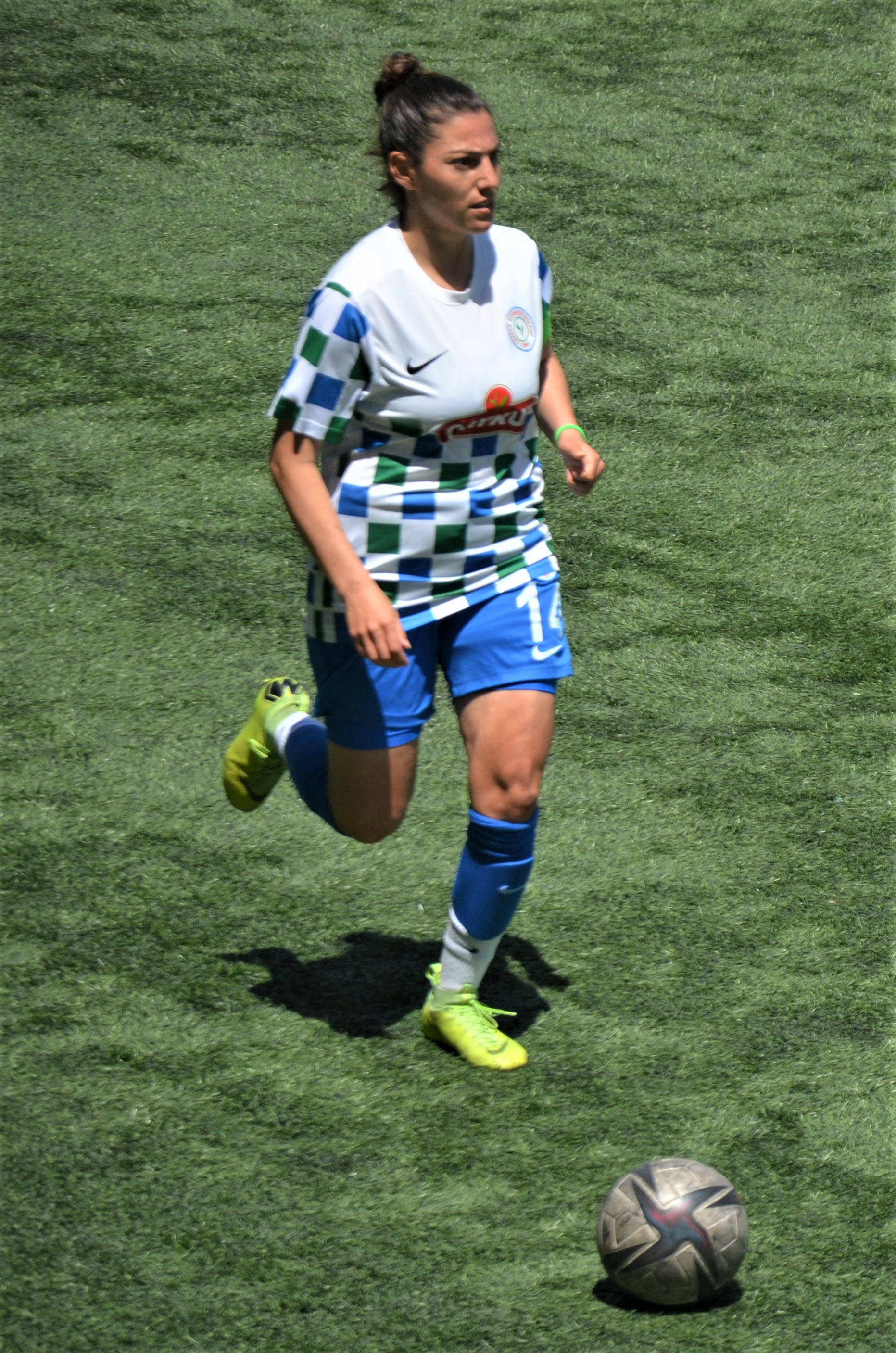
Remziye Bakır of Çaykur Rizespor in the 2021-22 Turkish Women's Football Super League.

Bakır obtained her license from Gazi Üniversitesispor in Ankara on 15 June 2010. She started playing for her team in the 2011-12 Turkish Women's First Football League debuting in the match on 26 March 2012. After scoring three goals in ten games, she transferred the next season to Fomget Gençlik ve Spor in the same city. Her club saw relegation to the Turkish Women's Second Football League at the end of the 2012-13 season. She played three more seasons in the Second League with Fomget GS, capped 47 times and scored 18 goals in total. In the 2016–17 season, Bakır joined the Diyarbakır-based club Amed S.K. in the Second League. At the end of the league season, she enjoyed her team's promotion to the First League. She played in 23 matches in two seasons and scored six goals for Amed S.K. In the second half of the 2017-18 First League season, she left her club, and moved to ALG Spor in Gaziantep to play in the Second League. Her team was promoted to the Fşrst League at the end of the season. Her team became runners-up of the 2018–19 season after losing the play-off match to Beşiktaş J.K. In the 2019-20 Women's First League season, she returned to her former club AMed S.K.

Bakır moved to her former club Fomget G.S. in the 2020–21 First League season.

For the 2021-22 Turkcell Women's Super League season, she transferred to the newly formed team >Çaykur Rizespor.

== International career ==
Bakır was admitted to the Turkey women's national under-19 football team, and debuted in the friendly match against Azerbaijan on 22 February 2014. She played in five matches of the 2014 Kuban Spring Tournament, three matches of the 2014 UEFA Championship Second qualifying round – Group 5, in two matches of the 2014 UEFA Development Tournament, in two games of the 2015 UEFA Championship First qualifying round – Group 4, in three matches of the 2015 UEFA Championship Elite round – Group 1, in three games of the 2015 UEFA Development Tournament, and in three matches of the 2016 UEFA Championship First qualifying round – Group 4. She capped 28 times and scored one goal for the national U-19 team.

International goals
Date	Venue	Opponent	Result	Competition	Scored
4 April 2015	Estádio Fernando Cabrita Lagos, Portugal	Finland	D 2–2	2015 UEFA Women's Under-19 Championship qualification - Elite round Group 1	1

== Career statistics ==
As of 29 December 2021.

Club	Season	League			Continental		National		Total	
Club	Season	Division	Apps	Goals	Apps	Goals	Apps	Goals	Apps	Goals
Gazi Üniversitesispor	2011–12	First League	10	3	–	–	0	0	10	3
Gazi Üniversitesispor	Total		10	3	–	–	0	0	10	3
Fomget G.S.	2012–13	First League	15	0	–	–	0	0	15	0
Fomget G.S.	2013–14	Second League	13	11	–	–	13	0	26	11
Fomget G.S.	2014–15	Second League	19	7	–	–	9	1	28	8
Fomget G.S.	2015–16	Second League	0	0	–	–	6	0	6	0
Fomget G.S.	Total		47	18	–	–	28	1	75	19
Amed S.K.	2016–17	Second League	15	4	–	–	0	0	15	4
Amed S.K.	2017–18	First League	8	2	–	–	0	0	8	2
Amed S.K.	Total		23	6	–	–	0	0	23	6
ALG Spor	2017–18	Second League	10	4	–	–	0	0	10	4
ALG Spor	2018–19	First League	10	0	–	–	0	0	10	0
ALG Spor	Total		20	4	–	–	0	0	20	4
Amed S.K.	2019–20	First League	14	1	–	–	0	0	14	1
Amed S.K.	Total		14	1	–	–	0	0	14	1
Fomget G.S.	2020–21	First League	5	2	–	–	0	0	5	2
Fomget G.S.	Total		5	2	–	–	0	0	5	2
Çaykur Rizespor	2021–22	Super League	2	0	–	–	0	0	2	0
Çaykur Rizespor	Total		2	0	–	–	0	0	2	0
Career total			121	34	-	-	28	1	149	35

== Honours ==
Turkish Women'sFirst League

ALG Spor
Runners-up (1): 2018–19

Turkish Women's Second League

Fomget Dençlik ve Spor
Runners-up (1): 2013–14

Amed S.K.
Runners-up (1): 2016–17

ALG Spor
Winners (1): 2017–18
