= Gülbin Hız =

Turkish footballer (born 1994)

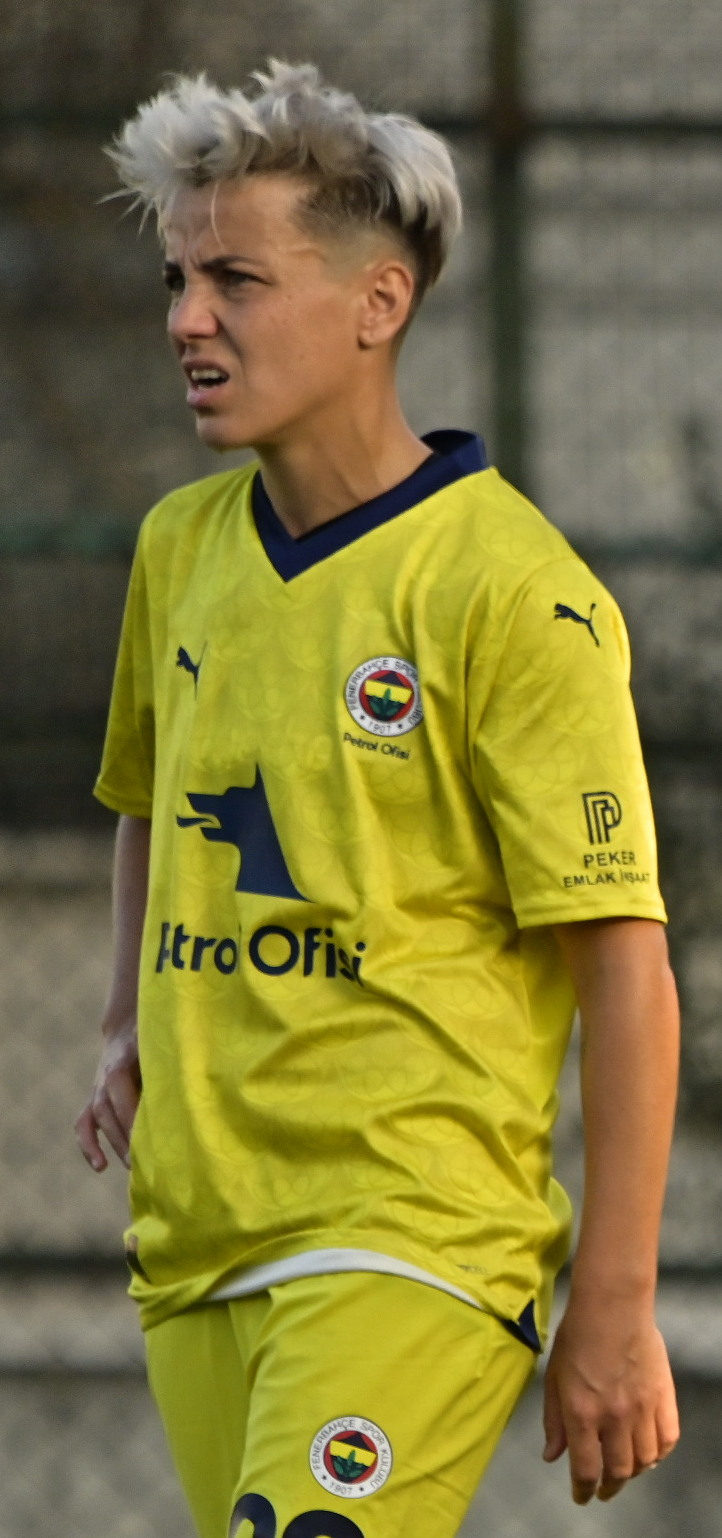
- Gülbin Hız for Fenerbahçe in the 2023–24 season.

Personal information
- Date of birth: 11 June 1994 (age 32)
- Place of birth: Gölcük, Kocaeli, Turkey
- Position: Midfielder

Team information
- Current team: Ankara BB Fomget
- Number: 28

Senior career*
Years	Team	Apps	(Gls)
2008–2011	Gölcükspor	41	(24)
2011–2013	Derince	25	(15)
2013–2015	Konak	26	(5)
2015–2017	Trabzon İdmanocağı	39	(13)
2017–2018	Konak	19	(2)
2018–2020	ALG	38	(11)
2021	Zhytlobud-2 Kharkiv		
2021–2023	ALG	30	(0)
2023–2024	Fenerbahçe	21	(0)
2024–	Ankara BB Fomget	19	(1)

International career^{‡}
2009–2010	Turkey U17	16	(8)
2011–2012	Turkey U19	18	(0)
2014	Turkey U21	1	(0)
2011–	Turkey	49	(5)
- * Club domestic league appearances and goals as of 4 May 2025 ‡ National team caps and goals as of 3 June 2025

Gülbin Hız (born 11 June 1994) is a Turkish women's footballer who plays as midfielder in the Women's Super League for Ankara BB Fomget. She was part of the Turkey girls' national U17, Turkey women's national U19, and is a member of the Turkey women's national team.

== Club career ==
=== Gölcükspor ===
Gülbin Hız obtained her license on 10 June 2008. She entered Gölcükspor at her hometown, where she played three seasons from 2008 to 2009. She debuted in the Turkish Women's First League with her team's promotion in the 2010–11 season. She capped 41 times and scored 24 goals with Gölcükspor, where she served also as the team captain.

=== Derince Belediyespor ===
Then, Hız transferred to Derince Belediyespor, a team in the Second League. After one season, she again enjoyed the promotion of her new team to the First League. She played two seasons, appearing in 25 games and netting 15 goals.

=== Konak Belediyespor ===
She signed for the league-champion Konak Belediyespor at the end of the 2012–13 season.

She debuted at the 2013–14 UEFA Women's Champions League playing in six of the total seven matches until the end of the Round 16.

She netted five goals in 26 games in two seasons.

=== Trabzon İdmanocağı ===
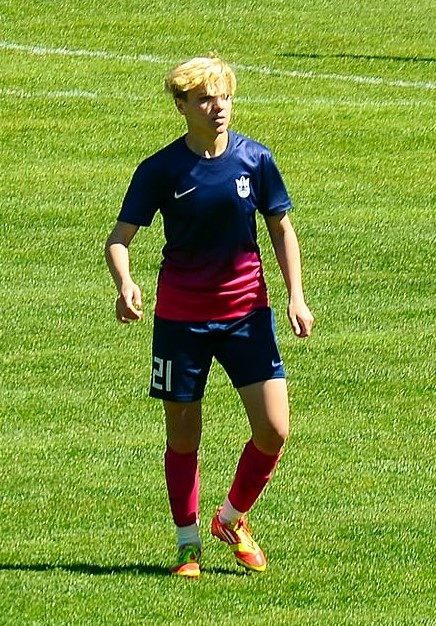
Gülbin Hız for Konak Belediyespor in the 2014–15 season

Hız transferred to Trabzon İdmanocağı for the 2015–16 season.

=== Konak Belediyespor ===
After two seasons, Hız transferred to the İzmir-based club Konak Belediyespor again. She took part in three matches of the 2017–18 UEFA Women's Champions League qualifying round in Tbilisi, Georgia.

=== ALG Spor ===
After one season with Konak Belediyespor, she moved to Gazianyep to join the recently promoted club ALG Spor. She played at the |2020–21 UEFA Women's Champions League qualifying round against the Albanian team KFF Vllaznia Shkodër in Shkodër, Albania on 3 November 2020, and scored one goal in the penalty shoot-out.

=== Zhytlobud-2 ===
On 22 March 2021, Hız moved to Ukraine and joined WFC Zhytlobud-2 Kharkiv to play in the Ukrainian Women's League.

=== ALG Spor ===
For the 2021–22 Women's Super League season, she returned to her former club ALG Spor. She enjoyed the 2021–22 Women's Super League champion title of her team. On 18 August 2022, she played in the 2022–23 UEFA Women's Champions League.

=== Fenerbahçe ===
Hız moved to Istanbul and joined Fenerbahçe S.K. in the 2023–24 Super League season.

=== Ankara BB Fomget ===
In the 2024–25 Super League season, she transferred to Ankara BB Fomget. She won the champions title in the season.

International goals for clubs
Date	Venue	Opponent	Competition	Result	Scored
ALG Spor
November 3, 2020	Loro Boriçi Stadium, Shkodër, Albania	(Albania) Vllaznia	2020–21 UEFA Women's Champions League qualifying round	L 3–3 (a.e.t.) (3–2 p)	1

== International career ==
=== Turkey girls' U-17 ===
Gülbin Hız was admitted to the Turkey women's U-17 team debuting in the friendly match against the Bulgarian girls on June 26, 2009. She capped 16 times and scored 8 goals with the Turkey national girls' U-17 team.

=== Turkey women's U-19 ===
Around the same time, she was called up to the Turkey women's U-19 team, and played for the first time in the friendly match against Moldova on August 15, 2009. She capped 18 times in total for the Turkey junior women's team.

=== Turkey women's ===
Hız became member of the Turkey women's team, appearing for the first time in the friendly match against Portugal on August 23, 2011. She played at the UEFA Women's Euro 2013 qualifying – Group 2 match against the women from Kazakhstan on September 22, 2011. End 2012, she was called up again to the women's national team. She scored two goals in two matches at the UEFA Women's Euro 2022 qualifying Group A, and again two goals intwo matches of the 2023–24 UEFA Women's Nations League C.

International goals (Friendly matches not included)
Date	Venue	Opponent	Competition	Result	Scored
Turkey girls' U-17
October 8, 2010	Marcel De Kerpel Stadium Wetteren, Belgium	Armenia	2011 UEFA Women's Under-17 Championship	W 7–0	2
Turkey women's
September 18, 2020	Stanko Mlakar Stadium, Kranj, Slovenia	Slovenia	UEFA Women's Euro 2022 qualifying Group A	L 1–3	1
November 27, 2020	Sportsland, Tallinn, Estonia	Estonia	UEFA Women's Euro 2022 qualifying Group A	W 4–0	1
December 1, 2023	LFF Stadium, Vilnius, Lithuania	Lithuania	2023–24 UEFA Women's Nations League C	W 4–0	1
December 5, 2023	Mersin Stadium, Mersin, Turkey	Georgia	2023–24 UEFA Women's Nations League C	W 2–0	1

== Career statistics ==
As of match played on 4 May 2025

Club	Season	League			Continental		National		Total	
Club	Season	Division	Apps	Goals	Apps	Goals	Apps	Goals	Apps	Goals
Gölcükspor	2008–09	Second League	6	2	–	–	3	0	9	2
Gölcükspor	2009–10	Second League	17	11	–	–	14	6	31	17
Gölcükspor	2010–11	First League	18	11	–	–	10	2	28	13
Gölcükspor	Total		41	24	–	–	27	8	68	32
Derince Belediyespor	2011–12	Second League	7	4	–	-	5	0	12	4
Derince Belediyespor	2012–13	First League	18	11	–	–	5	0	23	11
Derince Belediyespor	Total		25	15	–	–	10	0	35	15
Konak Belediyespor	2013–14	First League	15	3	6	0	0	0	21	3
Konak Belediyespor	2014–15	First League	11	2	2	0	3	1	16	3
Konak Belediyespor	Total		26	5	8	0	3	1	37	6
Trabzon İdmanocağı	2015–16	First League	19	7	–	–	5	0	24	7
Trabzon İdmanocağı	2016–17	First League	20	6	–	–	0	0	20	6
Trabzon İdmanocağı	Total		39	13	–	–	5	0	44	13
Konak	2017–18	First League	19	2	3	0	0	0	22	2
ALG	2018–19	First League	17	9	–	–	0	0	17	9
ALG	2019–20	First League	15	1	–	–	1	0	16	1
ALG	2020–21	First League	6	1	1	1	6	2	13	4
ALG	2021–22	Super League	22	0	–	–	8	0	30	0
ALG	2022–23	Super League	8	0	1	0	4	0	13	0
ALG	Total		68	11	2	1	19	2	89	14
Fenerbahçe	2023–24	Super League	21	0	–	–	11	2	32	2
ABB Fomget	2024–25	Super League	19	1	–	–	7	0	26	1
Career total			258	71	13	1	82	13	353	85

== Honours ==
Turkish Women's Football First League

Konak Bld.
Champions (2): 2013–14, 2014–15
Third places (1): 2017–18

Trabzon İdmanocağı
Third places (1): 2015–16

ALG
Champions (2): 2019–20, 2021–22
Runners-up (1): 2018–19
Third places (1): 2020–21

Turkish Women's Football Super League

Fenerbahçe
Third places (1): 2023–24

Ankara BB Fomget
Champions (1): 2024–25
