= Jovana Petrović =

Serbian footballer (born 2001)

Personal information
- Date of birth: 11 September 2001 (age 25)
- Position: Goalkeeper

Team information
- Current team: SK Slavia Prague
- Number: 1

Senior career*
Years	Team	Apps	(Gls)
2021	Crvena zvezda		
2022	Avaldsnes IL	10	(0)
2022–2023	ALG Spor	1	(0)
2023–2026	Crvena zvezda	0	(0)

International career
2022	Serbia	1	
- * Club domestic league appearances and goals as of 16 October 2022

Jovana Petrović (Serbian Cyrillic: Јована Петровић; born 11 September 2001) is a Serbian women's football goalkeeper, who plays for SK Slavia Prague. She is a member of the Serbia women's national team.

== Club career ==
=== Serbia ===
Petrović played for the Serbian SuperLiga club ŽFK Crvena zvezda in Belgrade between 1 July 2021 and 31 December 2021.

=== Norway ===
On 1 January 2022, she went to Norway and transferred to the Toppserien club Avaldsnes IL. She appeared in ten matches.

=== Turkey ===
On 8 August 2022, she moved to Turkey and signed for the Gaziantep-based 2021-22 Turkish Women's Super League champion ALG Spor. She played at the 2022–23 UEFA Women's Champions League qualifying rounds' first match for ALG Spor.

== International career ==
Petrović was part of the Serbia women's national team at the 2021 Turkish Women's Cup held in Alanya, Antalya, Turkey.
