= Tetyana Kozyrenko =

Ukrainian footballer (born 1996)

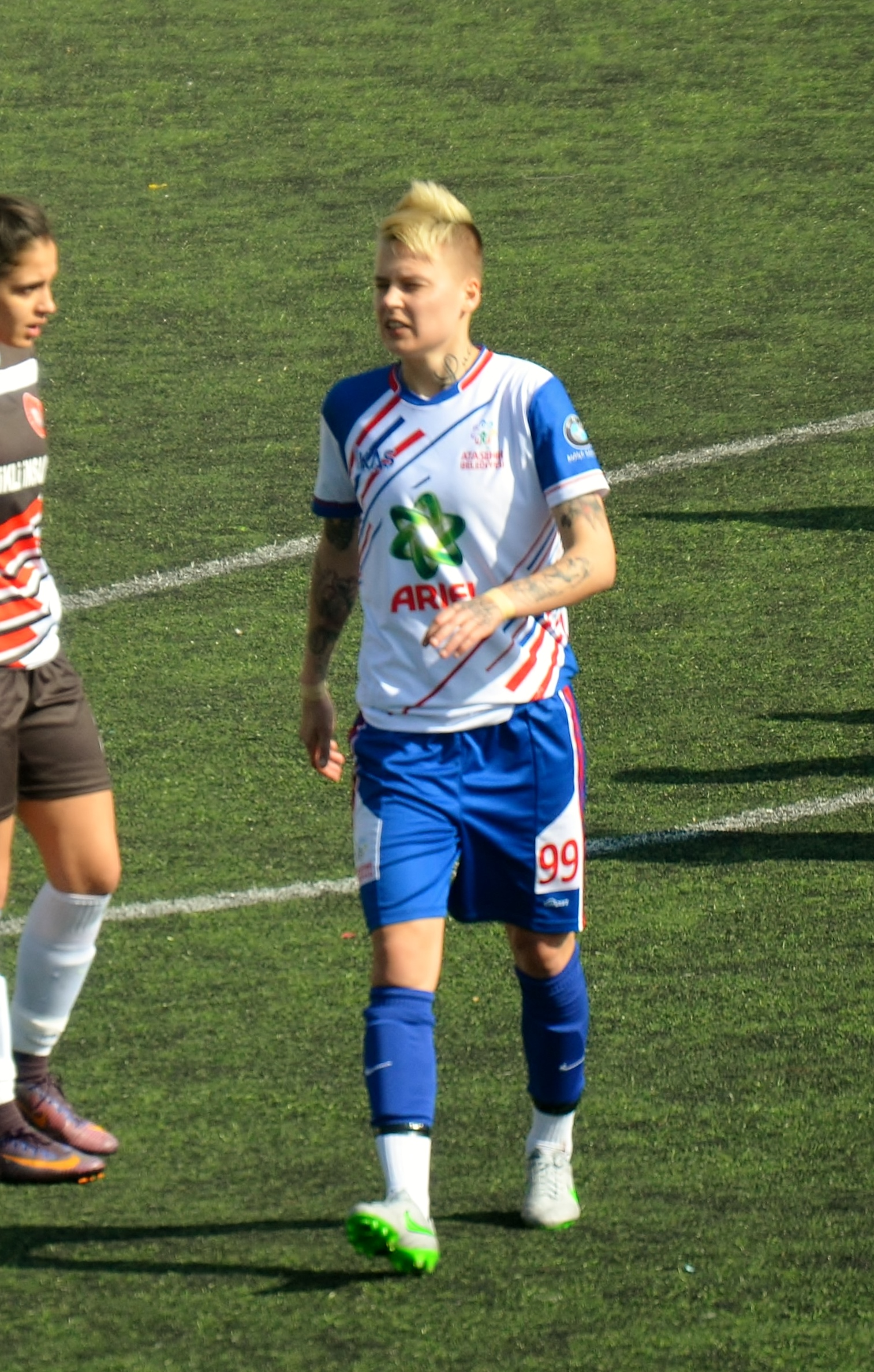
- Tetyana Kozyrenko for Ataşehir Belediyespor (February 2018)

Personal information
- Full name: Tetyana Kozyrenko
- Date of birth: 4 May 1996 (age 30)
- Place of birth: Feodosia, Ukraine
- Position: Forward

Team information
- Current team: Zvezda-2005

Senior career*
Years	Team	Apps	(Gls)
2012–2014	WFC Lehenda Chernihiv	15	(9)
2014–2015	Nadezhda Mogilev	17	(6)
2015–2016	WFC Lehenda Chernihiv	10	(8)
2016–2017	Gintra Universitetas		
2017	Panthers FC	7	(8)
2018	Ataşehir Belediyespor	9	(14)
2018-2019	Zvezda-2005	13	(8)
2019	ALG Spor	7	(7)
2020	Lokomotiv Moscow	8	(1)
2021	CSKA Moscow	17	(6)
2022–2023	Chertanovo Moscow	7	(3)
2023	Beşiktaş J.K.	0	(0)
2024–	Zvezda-2005	8	(4)

International career^{‡}
2011	Ukraine U-17	3	(2)
2013–2015	Ukraine U-19	15	(5)
2014–	Ukraine	10	(3)
- * Club domestic league appearances and goals as of 00:05, 14 August 2022 (UTC) ‡ National team caps and goals as of 12 June 2018

Tetyana "Tanya" Kozyrenko (Ukrainian: Тетяна Козиренко, born 4 May 1996) is a Ukrainian footballer, who plays for Zvezda-2005 in the Women's Football League.

== Career ==
=== Club ===
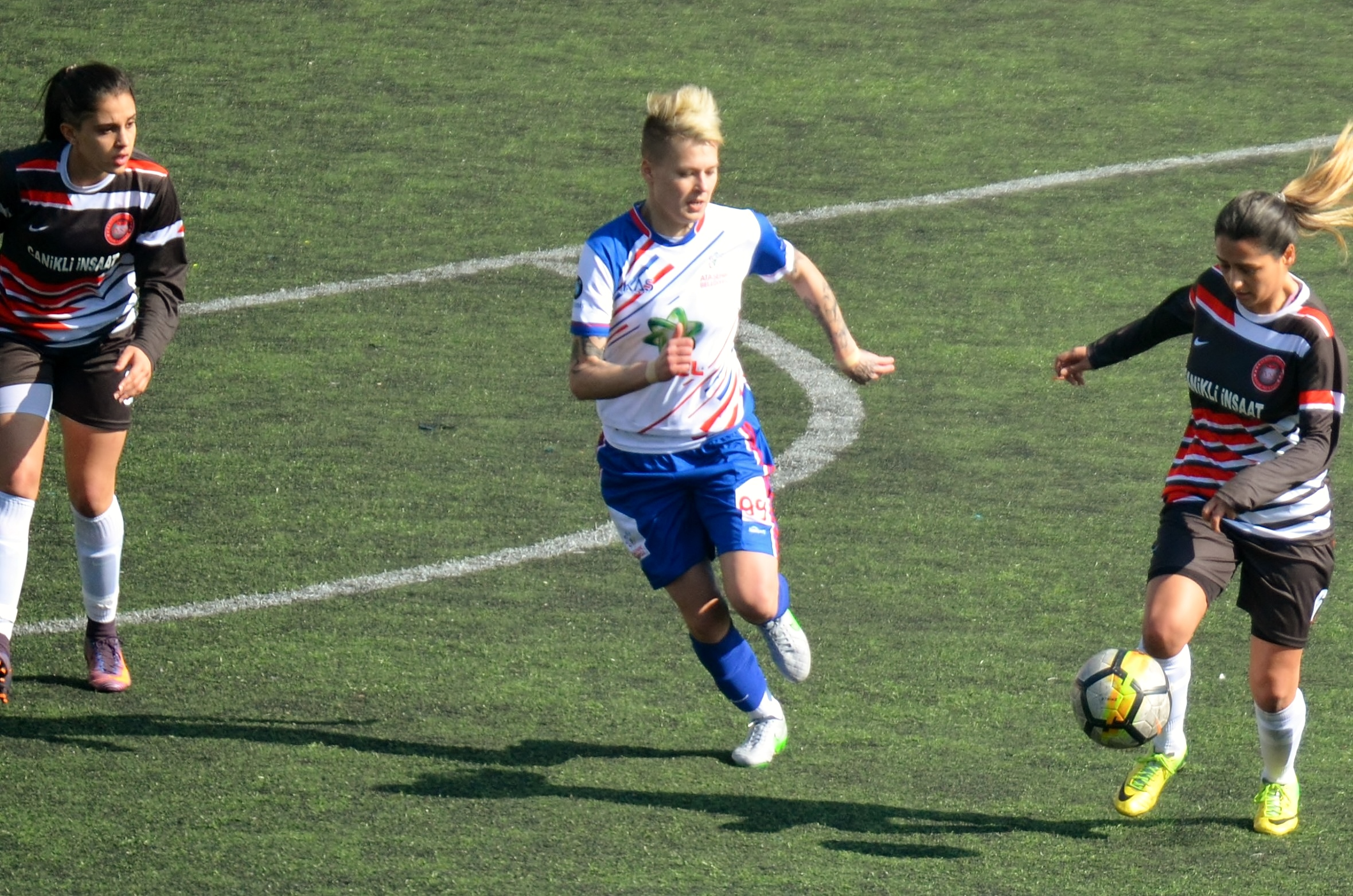
Tetyana Kozyrenko (mid) playing for Ataşehir Belediyespor in the 2017-18 Turkish Women's First Football League away match against Fatih Vatan Spor.

Kozyrenko began football playing at the age of 16 in the club WFC Lehenda Chernihiv in Chernihiv. She debuted in the 2012–13 season of the Ukrainian Women's League. After two years of appearing in 15 league matches and netting nine goals, she moved to Belarus joining Nadezhda in Mogilev, where she played in 17 games and scored six goals. She returned then to her former club in Ukraine after one season. Kozyrenko netted eight goals in ten matches for WFC Lehenda Chernihiv in the 2015–16 season. In February 2016, she went to Lithuania to play for Gintra Universitetas in the A Lyga Women. She played for FK Gintra in three matches of the 2016–17 UEFA Women's Champions League qualifying round – Group 7, and scored five goals in total. In May 2017, it was reported that she suffered a meniscus tear, and could return to the field four months after a surgery. In the 2017–18 season, she returned home to play for Panthers FC in Uman. She capped in seven matches scoring eight goals.

Kozyrenko moved to Turkey in February 2018 to play for the Istanbul-based club Ataşehir Belediyespor in the Turkish Women's First Football League. She signed a contract for one year with 2-year option. She scored four goals of five in total in her first match. Later in 2018, she played for Russian club Zvezda-2005 in Perm, and became a Russian Cup winner.

In the beginning of the second half of the 2018–19 Turkish Women's League season, she transferred to the Gaziantep-based ALG Spor, which was promoted newly to the First League.

=== International ===
Kozyrenko became a member of the Ukraine U-17 and debuted in the 2012 UEFA Women's Under-17 Championship qualification – Group 9 match against Azerbaijan U-17 on 30 September 2011. She later was a member of the Ukraine U-19 teams. Kozyrenko played for the Ukraine national team in the 2017 Four Nations Tournament held in Foshan, China. She scored two goals against Myanmar.

In 2018, she played in three matches of the 2019 FIFA Women's World Cup qualification – UEFA Group 4 for Ukraine.

== International goals ==
No.	Date	Venue	Opponent	Score	Result	Competition
1.	19 January 2017	Century Lotus Stadium, Foshan, China	Myanmar	1–0	4–0	2017 Four Nations Tournament
2.	19 January 2017	Century Lotus Stadium, Foshan, China	Myanmar	3–0	4–0	2017 Four Nations Tournament
3.	5 April 2018	Stadion Stanovi, Zadar, Croatia	Croatia	2–0	3–0	2019 FIFA Women's World Cup qualification
4.	5 April 2018	Stadion Stanovi, Zadar, Croatia	Croatia	3–0	3–0	2019 FIFA Women's World Cup qualification

== Career statistics ==
As of match played 112 May 2019.

Club	Season	League			Continental		National		Total	
Club	Season	Division	Apps	Goals	Apps	Goals	Apps	Goals	Apps	Goals
Ataşehir Belediyespor	2017–18	Turkish First League	9	14	–	–	3	0	12	14
Ataşehir Belediyespor	Total		9	14	-	-	3	0	12	14
Zvezda-2005	2018	Russian Women's Supreme Division	5	4	–	–	0	0	5	4
Zvezda-2005	Total		5	4	-	-	0	0	5	4
ALG Spor	2018–19	Turkish First League	7	7	–	–	0	0	7	7
ALG Spor	Total		7	7	-	-	0	0	7	7

== Honours ==
Turkish Women's First League

Ataşehir Belediyespor
Winners (1): 2017–18

AALG Spor
Runners-up (1): 2018–19

Russian Women's Supreme Division

Zvezda-2005
Third places (1): 2018
