= Antonia Dulčić =

Croatian footballer (born 1997)

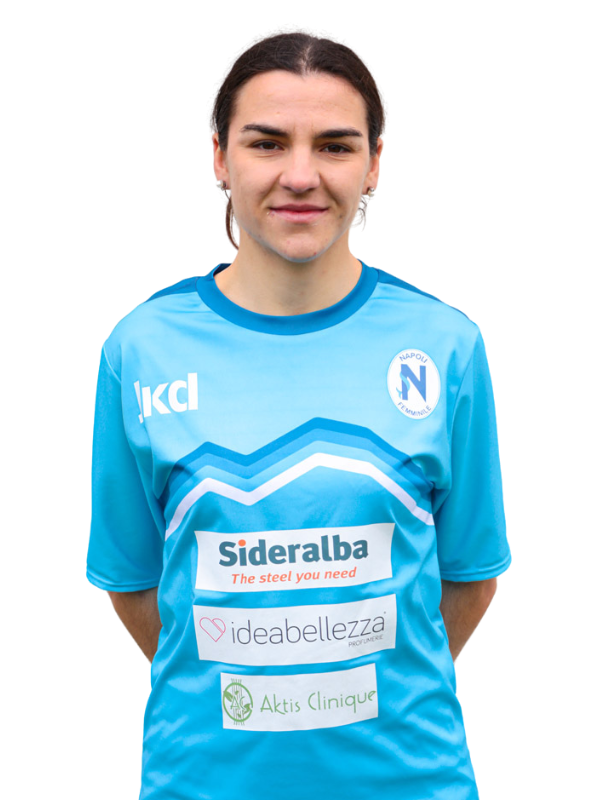
- Antonia Dulčić with Napoli in 2023

Personal information
- Date of birth: 4 February 1997 (age 29)
- Place of birth: Split, Croatia
- Position: Defender

Team information
- Current team: Hajduk
- Number: 3

Senior career*
Years	Team	Apps	(Gls)
–2022	Split		
2022–2023	Napoli	20	(2)
2023	ALG Spor	0	(0)
2024–	Hajduk	0	(0)

International career^{‡}
2012	Croatia U17	2	(0)
2014–2015	Croatia U19	4	(0)
2019–	Croatia	24	(0)
- * Club domestic league appearances and goals as of 17 September 2023 ‡ National team caps and goals as of 8 March 2020

Antonia Dulčić (born 4 February 1997) is a Croatian footballer who plays as a defender for Croatian club ŽNK Hajduk and the Croatia women's national team. In season 2022–23 she played for Italian Serie B club Napoli Femminile, gaining the promotion to Serie A.
