= İlayda Civelek =

Turkish footballer (born 1998)

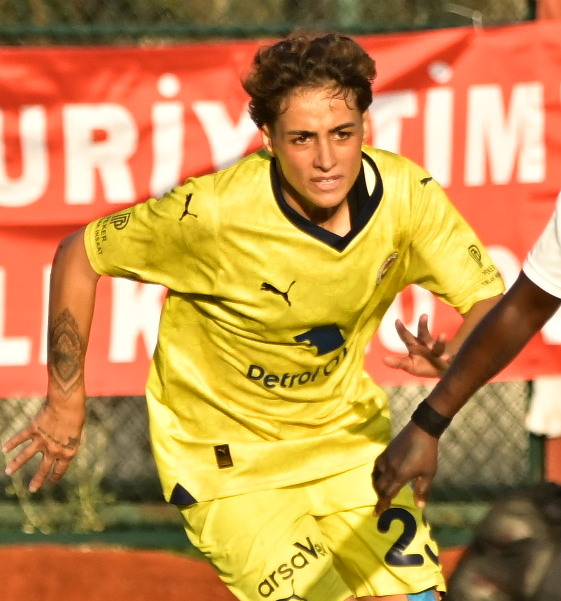
- Civelek for Fenerbahçe in the 2023–24 season

Personal information
- Date of birth: 6 July 1998 (age 28)
- Place of birth: Amasya, Turkey
- Position: Midfielder

Team information
- Current team: Fenerbahçe

Senior career*
| Years | Team | Apps | (Gls) |
| 2011–2016 | Amasya Eğitim Spor | 80 | (79) |
| 2016–2017 | Beşiktaş J.K. | 12 | (5) |
| 2017–2018 | Ataşehir Belediyespor | 8 | (0) |
| 2018–2019 | Kireçburnu Spor | 8 | (2) |
| 2019–2020 | Ataşehir Belediyespor | 21 | (11) |
| 2020–2022 | ALG Spor | 31 | (7) |
| 2022–2023 | Galatasaray | 16 | (2) |
| 2023– | Fenerbahçe | 27 | (0) |

International career^{‡}
| 2012 | Turkey U-15 | 1 | (1) |
| 2013–2015 | Turkey U-17 | 23 | (4) |
| 2015–2017 | Turkey U-19 | 17 | (8) |
| 2020– | Turkey | 42 | (1) |
- * Club domestic league appearances and goals as of 1 July 2024 ‡ National team caps and goals as of 3 June 2025

İlayda Civelek (born 6 July 1998) is a Turkish football midfielder, who plays in the Turkish Women's Football Super League for Fenerbahçe. She played for the Turkey women's U-19 team before she was admitted to the Turkey women's team .

== Club career ==
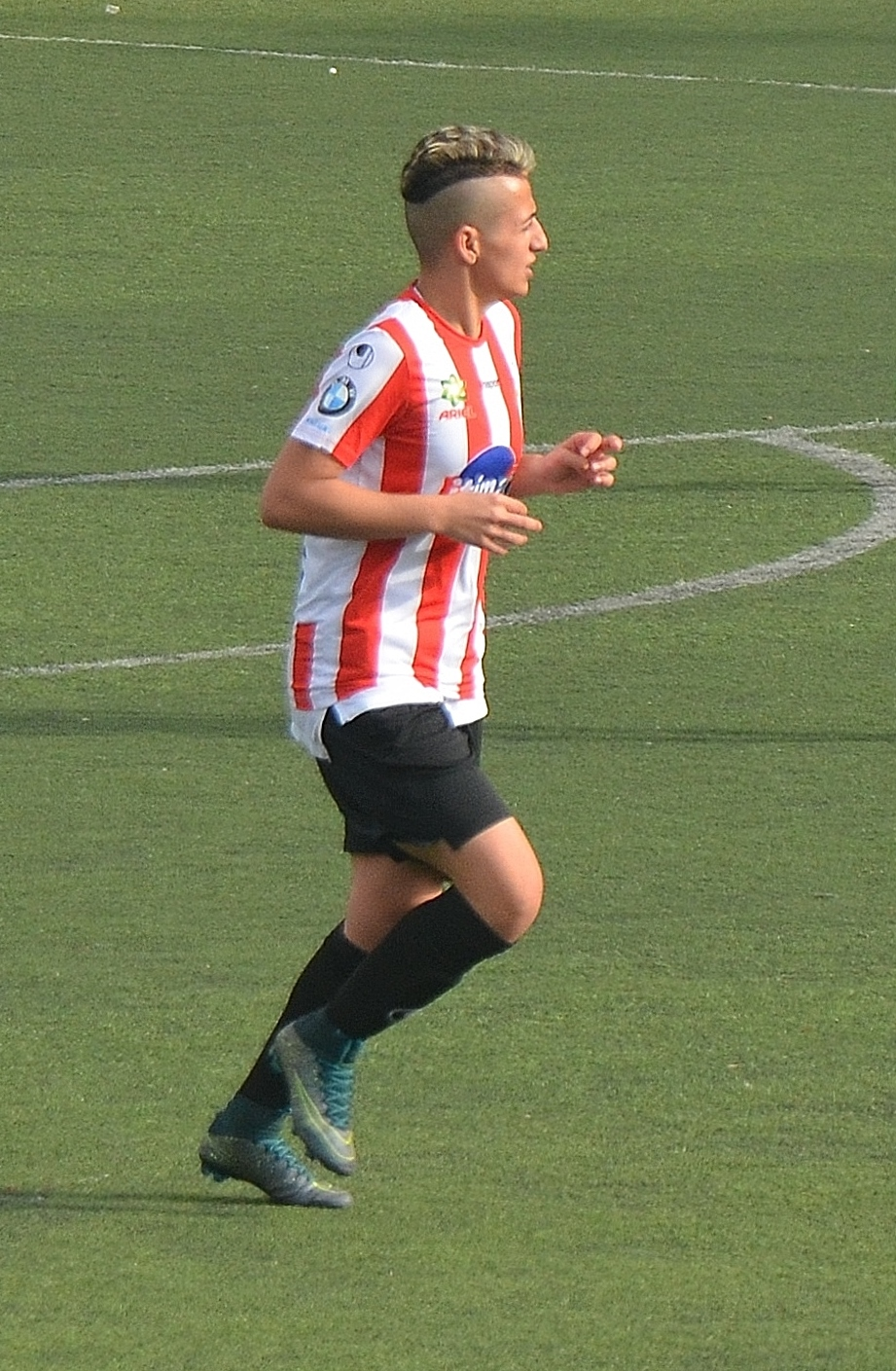
İlayda Civelek for Ataşehir Belediyespor in the 2017–18 season.

=== Amasya Eğitim Spor ===
Civelek obtained her license from her hometown club Amasya Eğitim Spor on 14 October 2011. She became top scorer in the 2015–16 Women's Second league season with 19 goals sharing the title with Başak Gündoğdu of Beşiktaş J.K.

=== Beşiktaş ===
After playing five seasons with the team, she was transferred by the Istanbul-based club Beşiktaş J.K., which was recently promoted to the First League.

=== Ataşehir Belediyespor ===
By October 2017, she transferred to Ataşehir Belediyespor.

=== Kireçburnu Spor ===
The next season, she transferred to Kireçburnu Spor.

=== Ataşehir Belediyespor ===
However, after the first half of the 2018-19 First League season, she returned to her former club Ataşehir Belediyespor.

=== ALG Spor ===
By October 2020, Civelek transferred to the 2019-20 Women's First League top team, which were entitled to participate at the 2020–21 UEFA Women's Champions League qualifying round. She debuted at the UEFA Women's Champions League playing in the 2020–21 UEFA Women's Champions League qualifying round against the Albanian team KFF Vllaznia Shkodër in Shkodër, Albania on 3 November 2020, and scored one goal. She enjoyed the 2021-22 Women's Super League champion title of her team.

=== Galatasaray ===
On 10 August 2022, she transferred to the Women's Super League club Galatasaray.

=== Fenerbahçe ===
On 21 July 2023, Civelek joined Super League fellow archrival Fenerbahçe.

== International career ==
Turkey girls' U-17

She played with her school team of Amasya Girls' Sports High School at the 2015 ISF World Tournament held in Guatemala. She scored four goals in one game, setting a record.

Turkeywomen's U-19

She was admitted to the Turkey girls' national U-15 team debuting in the friendly match against Belarus and scoring one goal. Between 2013 and 2015, she capped in 23 matches of the Turkey women's national U-17 team and scored four goals. Civelek entered the Turkey women's national U-19 team to play in the 2105 UEFA Development Tournament. She took part at the qualification matches of the 2017 UEFA Women's Under-19 Championship in 2016 and 2017.

Turkey women's

Civelek was admitted to the Turkey women's team, and debuted internationally in the UEFA Women's Euro 2022 qualifying Group A against Slovenia on 18 September 2020.

== Career statistics ==
=== Club ===
As of match played 1 July 2024

Appearances and goals by club, season and competition
| Club | Season | League | | | Continental | | National | | Total | |
| Club | Season | Division | Apps | Goals | Apps | Goals | Apps | Goals | Apps | Goals |
|---|---|---|---|---|---|---|---|---|---|---|
| Amasya Eğitim Spor | 2011–12 | Second League | 8 | 6 | – | | 0 | 0 | 8 | 6 |
| Amasya Eğitim Spor | 2012–13 | Second League | 12 | 11 | – | | 8 | 1 | 20 | 12 |
| Amasya Eğitim Spor | 2013–14 | Second League | 18 | 24 | – | | 8 | 1 | 26 | 25 |
| Amasya Eğitim Spor | 2014–15 | Second League | 22 | 19 | – | | 8 | 3 | 30 | 22 |
| Amasya Eğitim Spor | 2015–16 | Second League | 20 | 19 | – | | 10 | 4 | 30 | 23 |
| Amasya Eğitim Spor | Total | | 80 | 79 | 0 | 0 | 34 | 9 | 114 | 88 |
| Beşiktaş | 2016–17 | First League | 12 | 5 | – | | 7 | 4 | 19 | 9 |
| Ataşehir Belediyespor | 2017–18 | First League | 8 | 0 | – | | 0 | 0 | 8 | 0 |
| Kireçburnu Spor | 2018–19 | First League | 8 | 2 | – | | 0 | 0 | 8 | 2 |
| Ataşehir Belediyespor | 2018–19 | First League | 7 | 5 | – | | 0 | 0 | 7 | 5 |
| Ataşehir Belediyespor | 2019–20 | First League | 14 | 6 | – | | 0 | 0 | 14 | 6 |
| Ataşehir Belediyespor | Total | | 21 | 11 | 0 | 0 | 0 | 0 | 21 | 11 |
| ALG Spor | 2020–21 | First League | 4 | 0 | 1 | 1 | 5 | 1 | 10 | 2 |
| ALG Spor | 2021–22 | Super League | 27 | 7 | – | | 8 | 0 | 35 | 7 |
| ALG Spor | Total | | 31 | 7 | 1 | 1 | 13 | 1 | 45 | 9 |
| Galatasaray | 2022–23 | Super League | 16 | 2 | 0 | 0 | 6 | 0 | 22 | 2 |
| Fenerbahçe | 2023–24 | Super League | 27 | 0 | 0 | 0 | 1 | 1 | 28 | 1 |
| Career total | | | 203 | 106 | 1 | 1 | 57 | 15 | 265 | 122 |

International goals (Friendly matches not included)
| Date | Venue | Opponent | Competition | Result | Scored |
Turkey girls' U-17
| 12 May 2014 | Centro Desportivo da Madeira, Ribeira Brava, Madeira, Portugal | Portugal | UEFA Development Tournament | D 2–2 | 1 |
| 15 August 2014 | Maarjamäe, Tallinn, Estonia | Faroe Islands | UEFA Development Tournament | W 3–1 | 1 |
| 16 October 2014 | Mladost Stadium, Strumica, North Macedonia | Kazakhstan | 2015 UEFA Women's Under-17 Championship qualification - Group 8 | W 5–0 | 1 |
| 18 October 2014 | FC Turnuvo, Strumica, North Macedonia | North Macedonia | 2015 UEFA Women's Under-17 Championship qualification - Group 8 | W 5–0 | 1 |
Turkey women's U-19
| 9 June 2016 | Football Centre FRF, Buftea, Romania | Slovenia | UEFA Development Tournament | W 8–0 | 1 |
| 10 June 2016 | AMogoșoaia National Football Centre, Mogoșoaia, Romania | Romania | UEFA Development Tournament | W 8–1 | 1 |
| 12 June 2016 | Football Centre FRF, Buftea, Romania | Azerbaijan | UEFA Development Tournament | W 2–1 | 1 |
| 21 October 2016 | Albena Stadium, Albena, Bulgaria | Bulgaria | 2017 UEFA Women's Under-19 Championship qualification - Group 10 | W 3–0 | 1 |
| 7 April 2017 | Arslan Zeki Demirci Sports Complex, Antalya, Turkey | Czech Republic | 2017fUEFA Women's Under-19 Championship Elite round - Group 2 | D 2–2 | 2 |
Turkey women
| 27 November 2020 | Sportsland, Tallinn, Estonia | Estonia | UEFA Women's Euro 2022 qualifying Group A | W 4–0 | 1 |
| 26 September 2023 | Elazığ Atatürk Stadium, Elazığ, Turkey | Lithuania | 2023–24 UEFA Women's Nations League C | W 2–0 | 1 |

== Honours ==
Turkish Women's First Football League

Beşiktaş J.K.
Runners-up (1): 2016–17

ALG Spor
Winners (1): 2021-22
Third places (1): 2020–21

Individual

Turkish Women's Second League
Top scorer (1): 2015–16 with Amasya Eğitim Spor (19 goals).

Turkish Women's Super League
Crystal Feet - Best Defender: 2023-24.
