= Hasan Vural =

Turkish former footballer (born 1973)

Personal information
- Full name: Hasan Vural
- Date of birth: 17 December 1973 (age 52)
- Place of birth: West Berlin, West Germany
- Height: 1.87 m (6 ft 2 in)
- Position: Defender

Youth career
- –1992: Reinickendorfer Füchse

Senior career*
Years	Team	Apps	(Gls)
1992–1996	Reinickendorfer Füchse	85	(8)
1996–1997	Hertha BSC	14	(0)
1997–1998	KFC Uerdingen 05	12	(0)
1998–1999	Energie Cottbus	13	(0)
1999–2000	VfL Osnabrück	23	(0)
2000–2001	Erzurumspor	23	(1)
2002–2003	SV Elversberg	26	(0)
2003–2004	Eintracht Trier	11	(0)
2004–2005	Darmstadt 98	22	(0)
2005–2006	SV Yeşilyurt	11	(0)
2006	Berliner AK 07	7	(0)
2008–2011	FC Jeunesse Canach	21	(2)
Total		268	(11)

International career
1998	Turkey	1	(0)

Managerial career
- 2021–: ALG Spor
- * Club domestic league appearances and goals

Hasan Vural (born 17 December 1973 in West Berlin, West Germany) is a Turkish former footballer and football manager.

== Playing career ==
Vural made 23 appearances for Erzurumspor in the Turkish Süper Lig and played one game for Hertha BSC in Germany's top-flight Bundesliga during his playing career.

On 18 February 1998, Vural earned an international cap for appearing in the final five minutes of a friendly game against Israel.

== Manager career ==
Vural was appointed manager of the Gaziantep-based women's football club ALG Spor on 17 June 2021. His team finished the 2021-22 Turkish Women's Football Super League season as Group B leader and became league champion after the play-offs. On 19 June 2022, the club renewed his contract for the 2022-23 Women's League season. ALG Spor was entitled to represent Turkey at the 2022–23 UEFA Women's Champions League. They were eliminated in the First qualifying round Tournament 11's first match after losing 0–1 to SK Brann Kvinner from Norway.

=== Statistics ===
As of 18 August 2022.

Team	From	To	Record				
Team	From	To	G	W	D	L	Win %
ALG Spor
ALG Spor	2021	2022	27	24	2	1	88.89
ALG Spor	2022	2023	1	0	0	1	0.00
Total	2021	2023	28	24	2	2	85.71
