= ALG Spor =

- Full name: ALG Spor Kulübü
- Founded: 1998; 28 years ago
- Ground: Batur Stadium
- Coordinates: 37°03′31″N 37°23′49″E
- President: Servet Can
- League: Turkish Women's Football Super League
- 2024–25: 7th

ALG Spor, formerly known as Güneykent Spor, is a women's football club based in Gaziantep, southeastern Turkey. Founded in 1998. The club was named after its local sponsor ALG Textile. The club's ownership was transferred to the construction company Sercan İnşaat in the 2025–26 Super League season. The club's president is Servet Can. It is located in the İncilipınar neighborhood of Şehitkamil district. The team play their home matches at the Batur Stadium.

== History ==
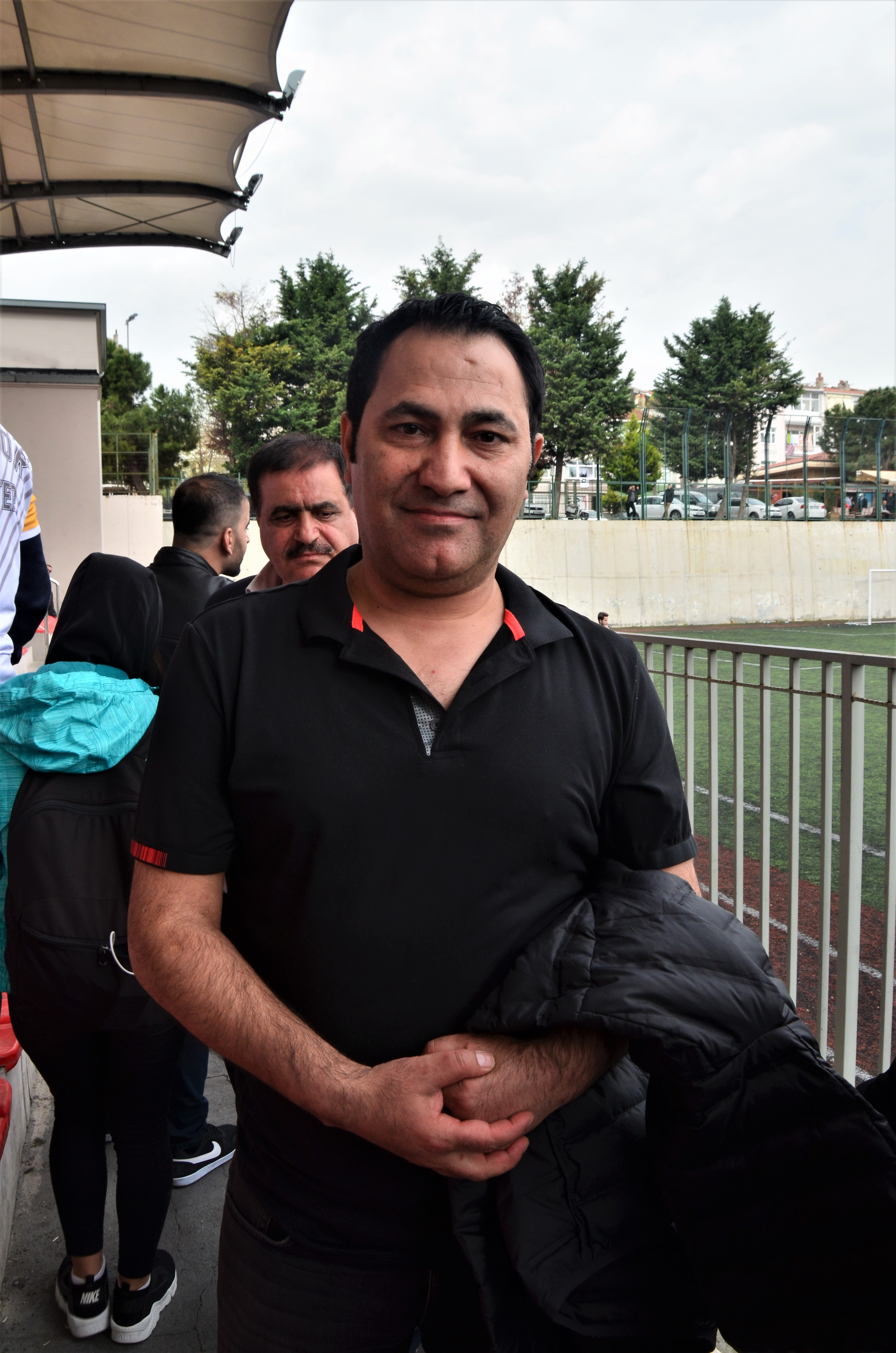
Founding club president Ali Gözcü (April 2019)

The club was founded as Güneykent Spor in Gaziantep. ALG Spor started playing league matches by entering the Group 6 of the 2015–16 Turkish Women's Third Football League season. They finished the season runners-up in the group. The next season, the team became runners-up at the end of the play-offs, and was entitled to play in the Turkish Women's Second Football League. They finished the 2017–18 Women's Second League season as champion after the play-offs, and were so promoted to the Women' First League for the 2018–19 season.

To strengthen the team for the matches in the Women's First League, the club transferred three experienced footballers, Yaşam Göksu, Fatoş Yıldırım, Gülbin Hız from Konak Belediyespor and Second-League striker Ebru Atıcı from Hakkarigücü Spor in the summer of 2018. Further transfers were local players Remziye Bakır, Mislina Gözükara and Fatma Songül. In the beginning of the second half of the 2018–19 season, the club transferred the Ukrainian striker Tetyana Kozyrenko. ALG Spor finished their first season in the Women's First League as runner-up behind Beşiktaş J.K. losing the champion title only in the last league round equal on points but with goal average. ALG Spor, the leader of the previous two rounds with goal average, won their last match with 5–1, Beşiktaş J.K. defeated their opponent by 9–0, which enabled them a goal average of four in the final. The Turkish Football Federation set a play-off round between the two teams to be played on 12 May 2019 at a neutral venue, in Manavgat, Antalya. The team became runners-up after losing to Beşiktaş J.K. in the play-off match with 0–1.

The 2019–20 First League season was discontinued on 19 March 2020 according to an announcement by the Youth and Sports Ministry including from the round 17 on due to the COVID-19 pandemic in Turkey. The Turkish Football Federation decided on 8 July 2020 that the further matches will not be played, the league will be registered according to the score ranking on the date when the league was stopped, no champion will be declared, and the top-ranking team ALG Spor, are to represent Turkey at the 2020–21 UEFA Women's Champions League.

ALG Spor played in the first qualifying round of the 2020–21 UEFA Women's Champions League against Albanian team KFF Vllaznia Shkodër on 3 November 2020. The team were eliminated after losing the penalty shout-out by 2–3 following a draw by 2–2 in the regular time and subsequently another draw by 3–3 after extra time.

ALG Spor finished the 2021–22 Women's Super League season as Group B leader and became league champion after the play-offs. The team was entitled to represent Turkey at the 2022–23 UEFA Women's Champions League. They were eliminated in the First qualifying round Tournament 11's first match after losing 0–1 to SK Brann KvinnerBrann Kvinner from Norway.

Prior to the 2025–26 Super League season, the club was transferred to the construction company Sercan İnşaat due to difficulties in terms of budget and sustainability of the club caused by the economic contraction and uncertainties in the global markets that the recent club sponsor ALG Textile faced. Servet Can took over the club's presidenship from Ali Gözcü.

== Stadium ==
ALG Spor play their home matches in the Batur Stadium located in Şahinbey district of Gaziantep.

== Statistics ==
As of 28 September 2025.

Season	League	Pos.	Pld	W	D	L	GF	GA	GD	Pts
2015–16	Third League – Gr. 6	2	18	15	1	2	120	6	+114	46
2015–16	Play-offs		1	0	0	1	7	8	-1	0
2016–17	Third League	2	25	22	1	2	112	14	+98	64 (^{1})
2017–18	Second League	1	20	14	3	3	53	21	+32	45
2018–19	First League	2	19	13	3	3	60	17	+43	42
2019–20	First League	1 (^{2})	15	14	1	0	53	6	+47	43
2020–21	First League Gr. C	1	3	3	0	0	15	0	+15	9
2020–21	Play-offs	3	3	2	0	1	5	0	+5	6
2021–22	Super League Gr. B	1	22	19	2	1	93	3	+90	59
2021–22	Play-offs	1	5	2	2	1	11	2	+9	17
2022–23	Super League Gr. A	1	16	13	2	1	49	12	+37	41
2022–23	Play-offs	3	4	2	1	1	6	4	+2	7
2023–24	Super League	6	30	17	4	9	51	36	+15	55
2024–25	Super League	7	26	13	6	7	51	35	+16	45
2025–26	Super League	15 (^{3})	29	3	0	26	14	160	-146	6
Green marks a season followed by promotion, red a season followed by relegation.

- (^{1}): three penalty points had been deducted imposed by the Turkish Football Federation.
- (^{2)}: Season discontinued. No league champion was declared.
- (^{3}): 3 points deducted, expelled from the league.
- (^{4}): Season in progress

== Current squad ==
As of 28 September 2025

Head coach: (Turkey) Cesin Karalar

Note: Flags indicate national team as defined under FIFA eligibility rules; some limited exceptions apply. Players may hold more than one non-FIFA nationality.

No.	Pos.	Nation	Player
1	GK	TUR	Hiranur Sönmez
3		TUR	İlayda Atçı
4		TUR	Gül Beyza Akpınar
7		SYR	Huda Bozo
8		TUR	Ecenaz Baykuş
9		TUR	Emine Burkay
10		TUR	Kardelen Patoğlu
11		TUR	Habibe Nur Işıkoğlu

No.	Pos.	Nation	Player
15		TUR	Esmanur Solak
17		TUR	Gülperi Atıcı
18		TUR	İrem Acar
21		TUR	Elif Reyyan Ağkemik
22	MF	TUR	Ceyda Özkan
30		TUR	Zeynep Buğakça
63		TUR	İlknur Eryoldaş

== Former managers ==
Manager	Season
(Turkey) Mehmet Karayılan	2015–16
(Turkey) Abdullah Dağdeviren	2016–17, 2017–18
(Turkey) Mehmet Karayılan	2018–19, 2019–20
(Turkey) Abdülkadir Aslan	2020–21
(Turkey) Hasan Vural	2021–22, 2022–23,
(Turkey) Mehmet Kenan Öztürk	2023–24
(Turkey) Hilmi Bugüner	2024–25

== Former notable players ==
- Angola
  - Patricia Seteco
- Azerbaijan
  - Ayshan Ahmadova
  - Kristina Bakarandze
  - Mislina Gözükara
  - Zhala Mahsimova
  - Vusala Seyfatdinova
- Belarus
  - Ekaterina Miklashevich
  - Karina Olkhovik
- Brazil
  - Thays Ferrer
- Cameroon
  - Henriette Akaba
  - Rose Bella
- Central African Republic
  - Christelle Demba
- Croatia
  - Antonia Dulčić
- Democratic Republic of the Congo
  - Marlène Kasaj
  - Grâce Mfwamba
  - Fideline Ngoy
  - Falonne Pambani
  - Ruth Kipoyi
- Ivory Coast
  - Aminata Haidara
- Montenegro
  - Darija Đukić
  - Jelena Karličić
- New Zealand
  - Maggie Jenkins
- Nigeria
  - Glory Ogbonna
  - Ujunwa Okafor
  - Esther Sunday
- Northern Cyprus
  - Zehra Borazancı
- Paraguay
  - Rosa Miño
- Republic of South Africa
  - Letago Madiba
  - Rachel Sebati
- Russia
  - Marina Kiskonen
- Serbia
  - Jovana Petrović
- Tunisia
  - Mariem Houij
- Turkey
  - Selda Akgöz
  - Nagehan Akşan
  - Derya Arhan
  - Remziye Bakır
  - Ezgi Çağlar
  - Sevgi Çınar
  - İlayda Civelek
  - Ecem Cumert
  - Medine Erkan
  - Emine Ecem Esen
  - Yaşam Göksu
  - Fatma Songül Gültekin
  - Gülbin Hız
  - Başak İçinözbebek
  - Arzu Karabulut
  - Eda Karataş
  - Seval Kıraç
  - Beyza Kocatürk
  - Handan Kurğa
  - Aslı Canan Sabırlı
  - Kezban Tağ
  - Ece Tekmen
  - Ebru Topçu
  - Yağmur Uraz
  - Gamze Nur Yaman
  - Aycan Yanaç
  - Fatoş Yıldırım
- Ukraine
  - Yana Derkach
  - Tetyana Kozyrenko
  - Iryna Pidkuiko
  - Liudmyla Shmatko

== International results ==
Event	Stage	Date	Venue	Opponent	Result	Scorers
2020–21 UEFA Women's Champions League	First qualifying round	Nov 3, 2020	ALB, Shkodër	(Albania) KFF Vllaznia Shkodër	L 3–3 (a.e.t.) (2–3 p)	Seyfatdinova, Arhan, Civelek, Topçu, Hız
2022–23 UEFA Women's Champions League	First qualifying round Tournament 11; 3rd	Aug. 18, 2022	SRB, Bačka Topola	(Norway) SK Brann Kvinner	L 0–1	

=== Ranking history ===
Season	Rank	Points	Ref.
2020–21	94 ▲	2.500	
2021–22	109 ▼	2.600	
2022–23	99 ▲	4.000	
2023–24	97 ▲	4.000	
2024–25	TBA		

== Honours ==
- Turkish Women's Football Super League

Champions (1): 2021–22
First Place (1): 2019–20 (^{1})
Runners-up (1): 2018–19
Third places (1): 2022–23

- Turkish Women's Second Football League

Champions (1): 2017–18

- Turkish Women's Third Football League

Runners-up (1): 2016–17

Note:

- (^{1}) declared league first, not a champion. Season discontinued. No league champion was declared.

== Kit history ==
2018–19 way	2019–20 way	2021–22 home	2022–23 away	2023–24 away	2024–5 away

== Squad history ==
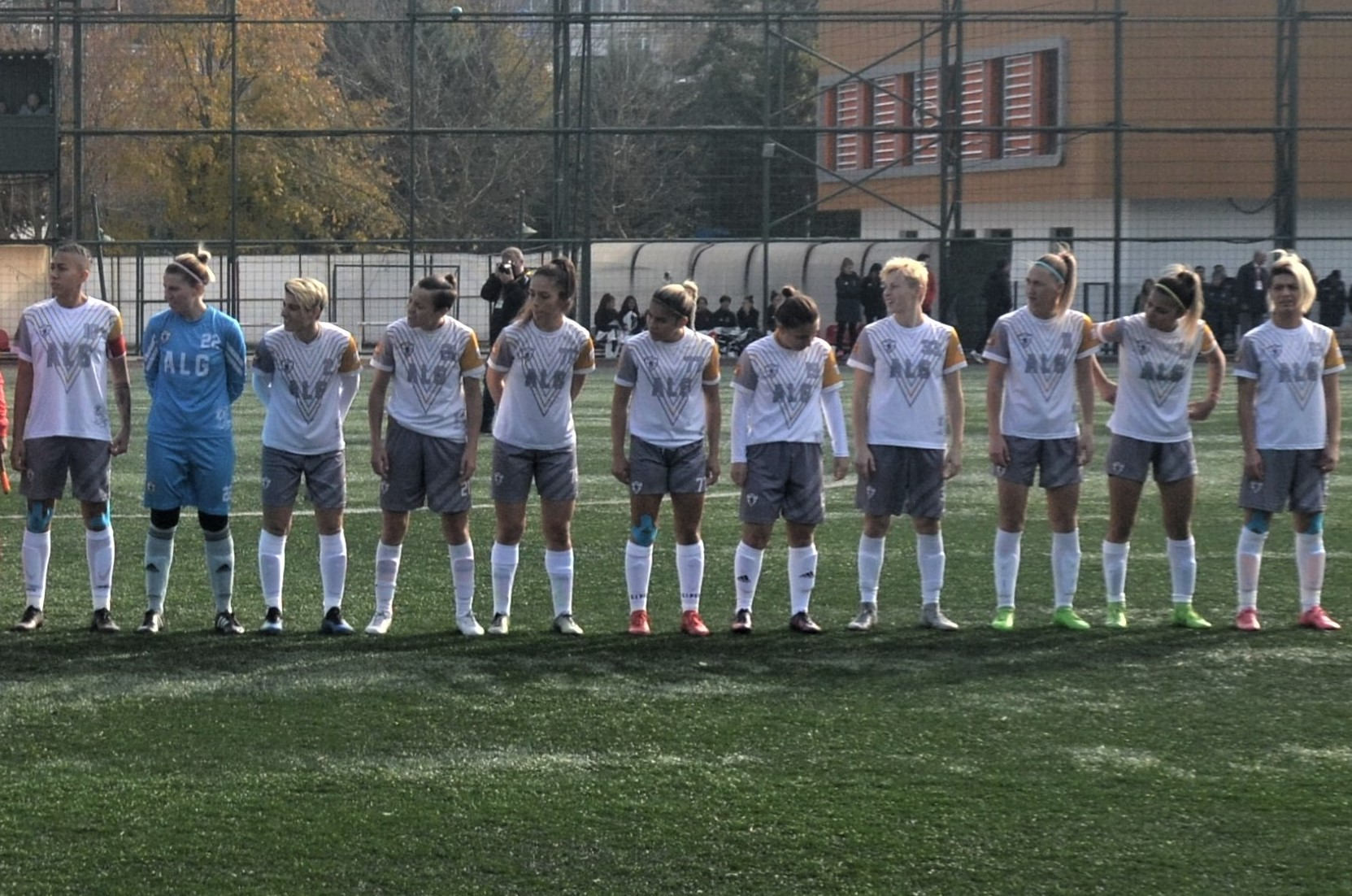
ALG Spor squad in the 2018–19 Women's First League

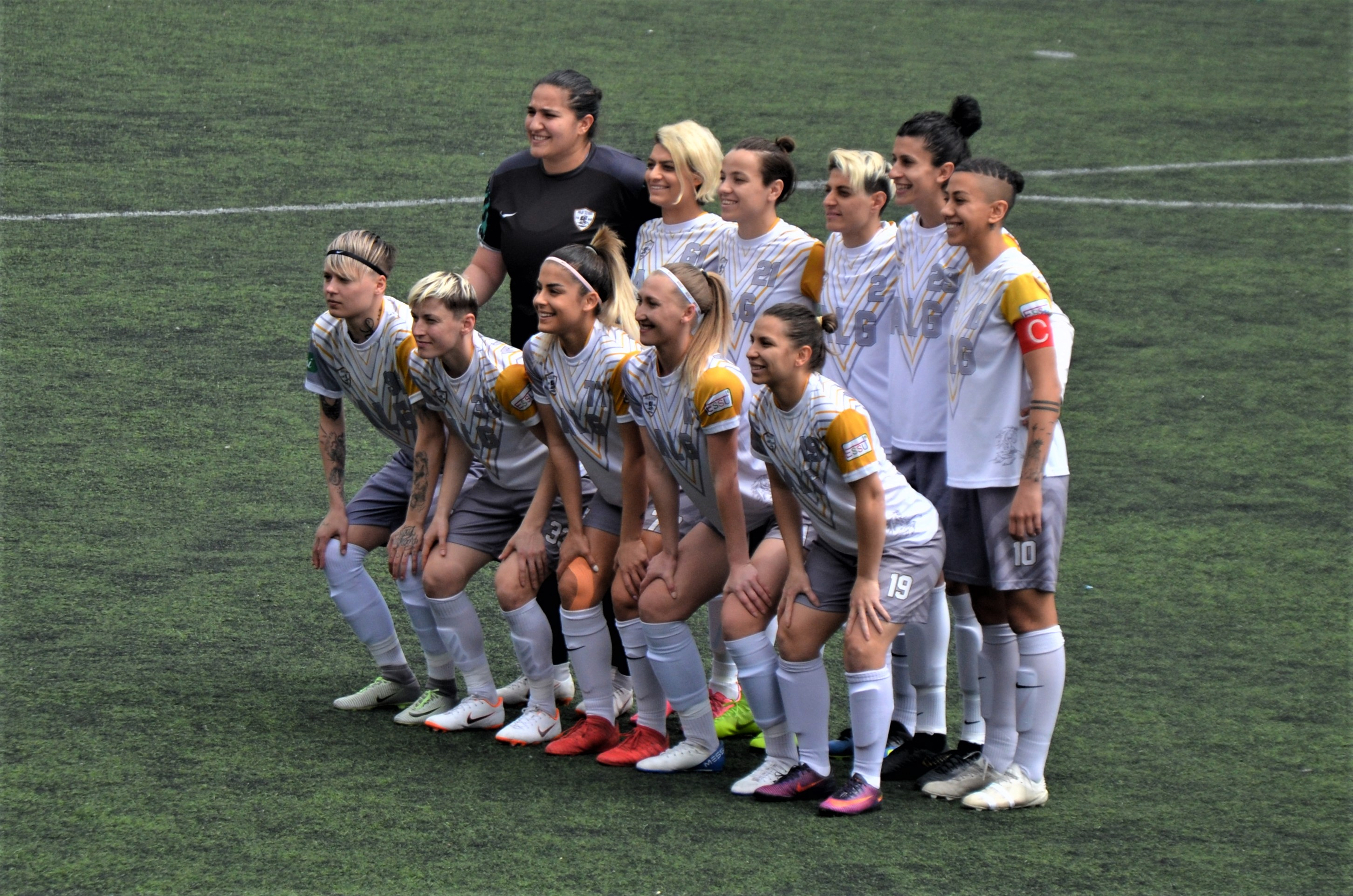
ALG Spor squad in the 2018-19 Women's First League

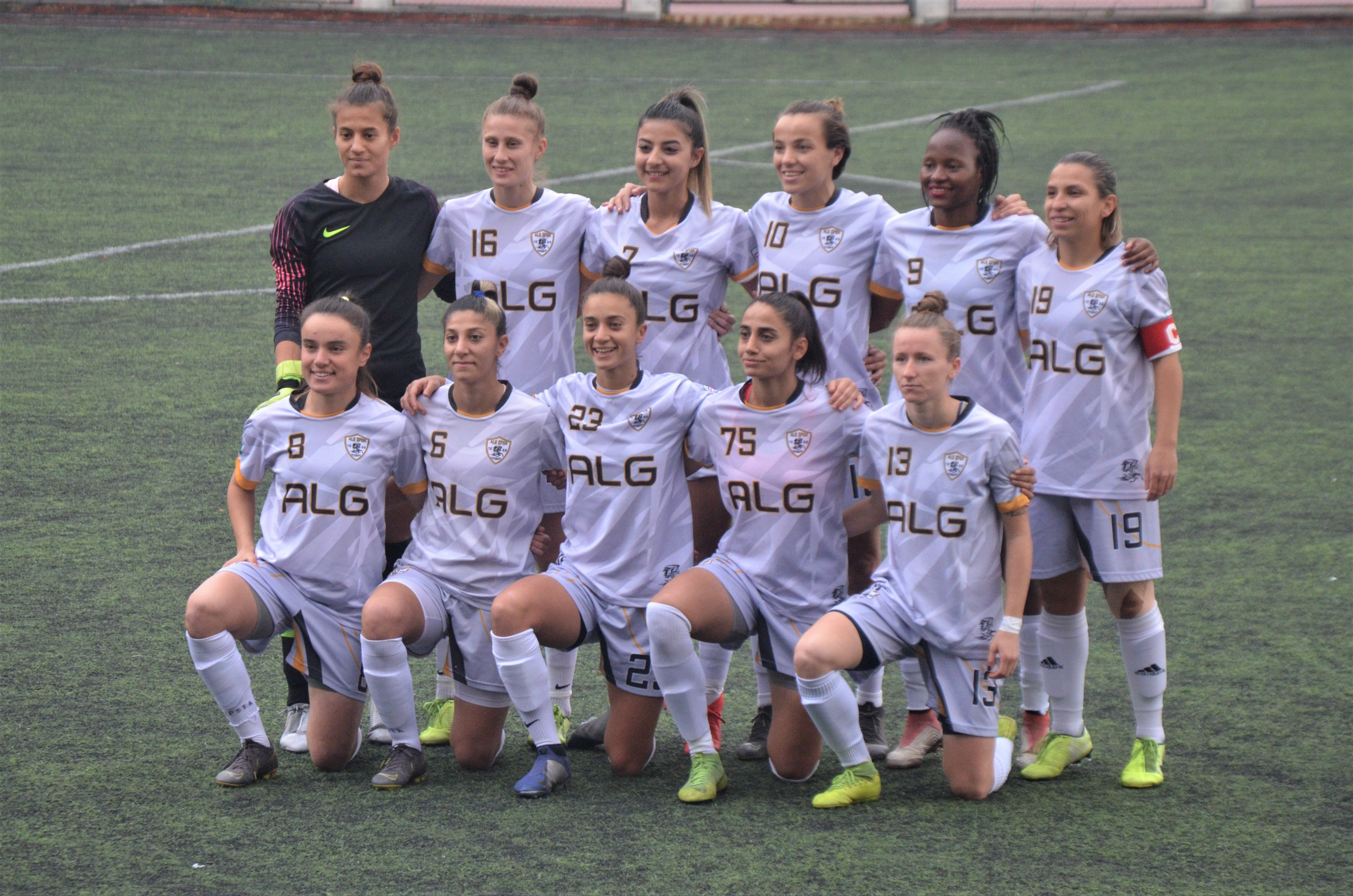
ALG Spor squad in the 2019-20 Turkish Women's First League
