= Thays Ferrer =

Brazilian footballer

Thays Férrer
Personal information
- Full name: Thays Énmyna Férrer Amorim
- Date of birth: 31 October 1999 (age 27)
- Place of birth: Barbalha, Ceará, Brazil
- Height: 1.69 m (5 ft 7 in)
- Position: Forward

Youth career
- 2021

Senior career*
Years	Team	Apps	(Gls)
2016	Viana MA		
2017	Abelhas Rainhas		
2018	Lusaca-BA		
2018–19	Tiradentes		
2019	Foz Cataratas/Athletico Paranaense		
2019–20	Paio Pires FC		
2020–21	Atlético Ouriense		
2021	Hwacheon KSPO WFC		
2022	ALG Spor	17	(5)
2022	Diosa Izumo FC		
- * Club domestic league appearances and goals as of 12 June 2022

Thays Énmyna Férrer Amorim (born 31 October 1999) is a Brazilian professional footballer who plays as a forward. She last played in the Turkish Women's Super League for ALG Spor.

== Early life ==
Thays Ferrer was born in Barbalha, Ceará, Brazil on 31 October 1999. She became a footballer after facing prejudice at home. She is 1.69 m (5 ft 6 1/2 in) tall at 63 kg (139 lb).

== Career ==
=== Brazil ===
Thays Ferrer started football playing as an amateur in her hometown. She then moved to Juazeiro do Norte, and became a professional.

She played in her country for Viana MA (2016), Abelhas Rainhas (2017), Lusaca-BA (2018), Tiradentes (2018/2019) and Foz Cataratas/Athletico Paranaense (2019). In 2016, her team won the State Championship Campeonato Maranhense. Her team became champion of the Campeonato Paulista de Futebol Feminino in 2018.

=== Foreign countries ===
In August 2019, she went to Portugal, and signed a 10-month contract with Paio Pires FC to play in the 2019–20 A.F. Setúbal II Divisão. The next season, she transferred to Atlético Ouriense (2020–21), who compete in the Campeonato Nacional Feminino.

In 2021, she was in South Korea for Hwacheon KSPO WFC in the WK League. Her team finished the season in fourth place.

On 22 February 2022, Ferrer moved to Turkey, and signed a one-year contract with the Gaziantep-based Women's Super League club ALG Spor. She scored five goals in 17 matches in the second half of the 2021–22 Women's Super League season. She enjoyed the league champion title with her team after play-offs.

On 25 August 2022, Ferrer signed with the Japanese Regional Chūgoku Soccer League club Diosa Izumo FC.

== Honours ==
Campeonato Maranhense (Brazil)

Viana MA
Winners (1): 2016.

Campeonato Paulista de Futebol Feminino (Brazil)

Lusaca-BA
Winners (1): 2018.

Women's Super League (Turkey)

ALG Spor
Winners (1): 2021–22.
