= 2018–19 Turkish Women's First Football League =

Turkish Women's First Football League
- Season: 2018–19
- Dates: 21 October 2018 – 28 April 2019
- Champions: Beşiktaş J.K. 1st title
- Promoted: ALG Spor, Hakkarigücü Spor
- Relegated: Trabzon İdmanocağı
- Champions League: Beşiktaş J.K.
- Matches: 72
- Goals: 271 (3.76 per match)
- Top goalscorer: (Tunisia) Mariem Houij
- Biggest home win: Beşiktaş J.K. 8–1; Fatih Vatan Spor (24 March 2019)
- Biggest away win: Kireçburnu Spor; 0–9; ALG Spor (10 March 2019); Kireçburnu Spor; 0–9; Beşiktaş J.K. (28 April 2019)
- Highest scoring: 9–0
- All statistics correct as of 12 May 2019.

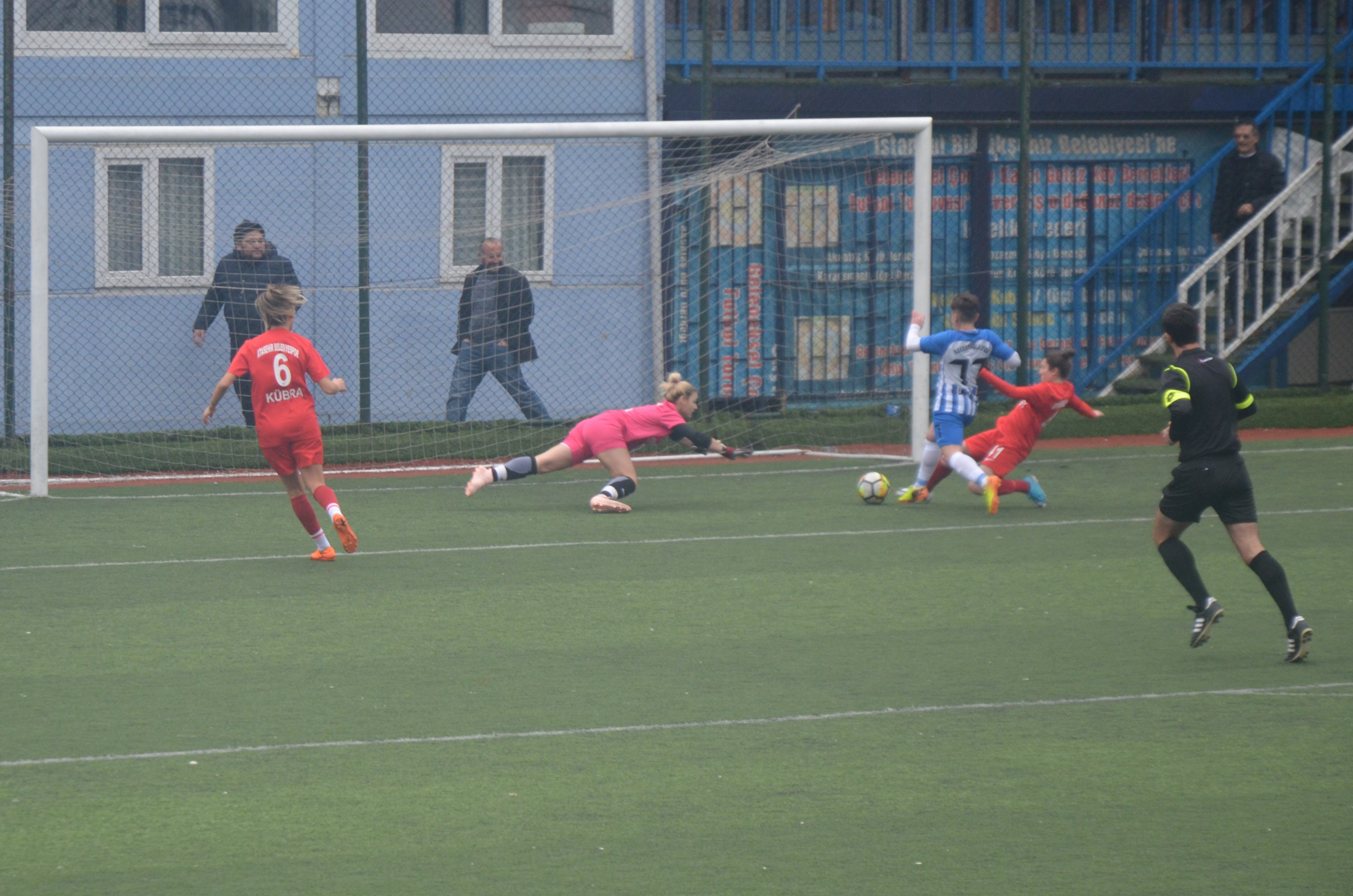
Ataşehir Belediyespor (red) vs Hakkarigücü Spor (blue/white) at Yenisahra Stadium.

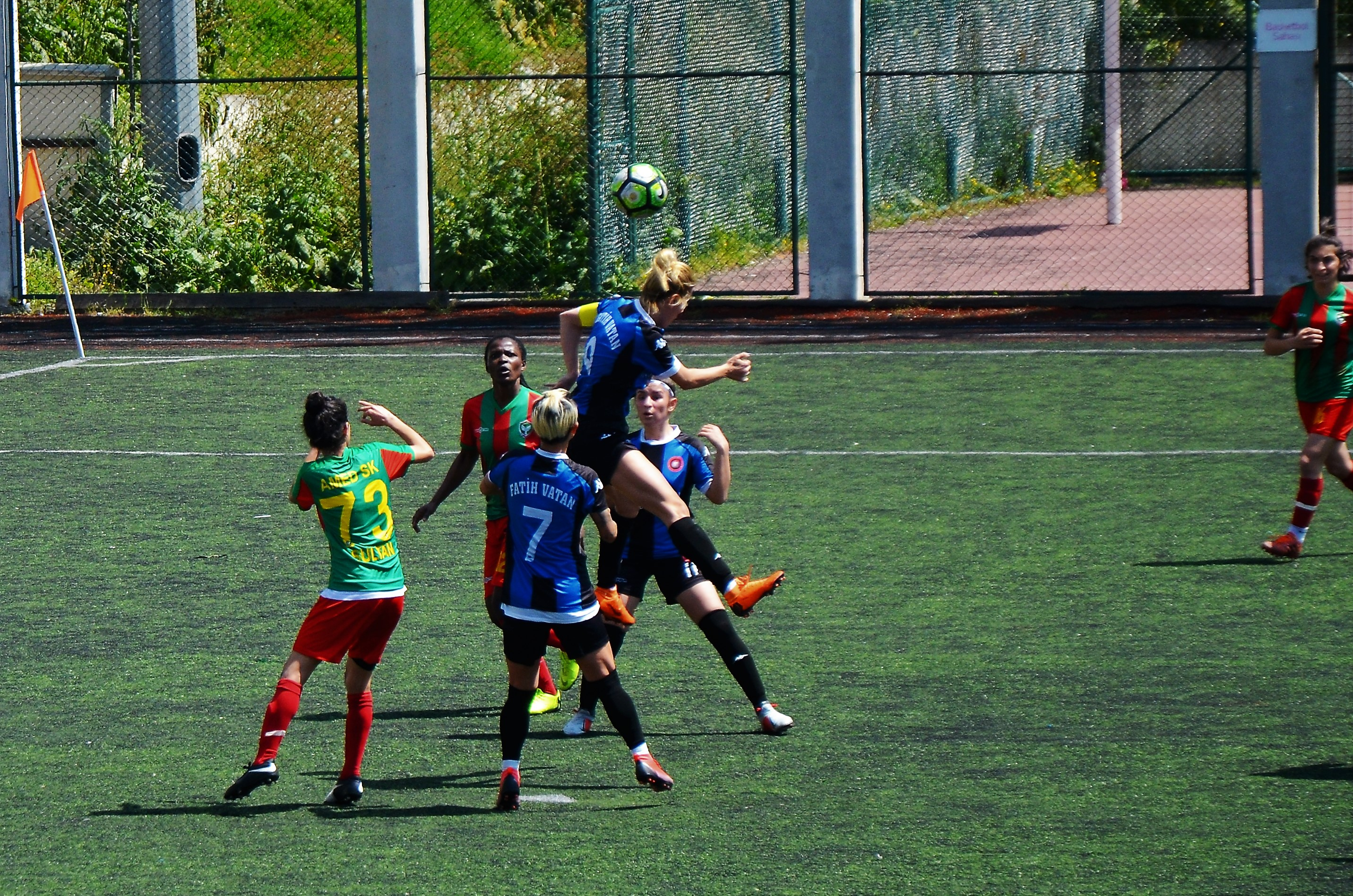
Fatih Vatan Spor (blue/black) vs Amed S.K. (red/green) at Fatih Mimar Sinan Stadium.

The 2018–19 season of the Turkish Women's First Football League is the 23rd season of Turkey's premier women's football league.

The league season started with the first week matches on 21 October 2018. The regular season concluded with the 18th week matches on 28 April. 2019. Ten teams competed with two promoted teams, ALG Spor of Gaziantep and Hakkarigücü Spor from Hakkari, which replace the relegated teams 1207 Antalyaspor and İlkadım Belediyesi from Samsun. Four teams from Istanbul continued to take part in the 2018–19 season. As the teams Beşiktaş J.K. and ALG Spor finished the regular season equal on points, a play-off match was scheduled at aneutral venue. Beşiktaş J.K. became champion after defeating ALG Spor in the play-off match with 1–0. According to the reglement change by the Turkish Football Federation on 1 October 2019, the number of teams in the Women's First League was increased from ten to twelve. Contrary to former reglement, no teams should relegate in the upcoming season. However, Trabzon İO relegated as they did not show up in the entire season.

== Teams ==
=== Team changes ===
Relegated from 2017–18 First League	Promoted from 2017–18 Second League
1207 Antalya Spor; İlkadım Belediyesi Spor	ALG Spor; Hakkarigücü Spor

Location of teams in the 2018–19 season of Turkish Women's First Football League

Season 2018–19
Team	Hometown	Ground	Capacity	2017–18 finish
ALG Spor	Gaziantep	Batur Stadium		1st (Second League)
Amed Sportif Faaliyetler	Diyarbakır	Talaytepe Sports Facility		7th
Ataşehir Belediyespor	Istanbul	Yeni Sahra Stadium	700	1st
Beşiktaş J.K.	Istanbul	Çilekli Football Field	800	2nd
Fatih Vatan Spor	Istanbul	Fatih Mimar Sinan Stadium	800	6th
Hakkarigücü Spor	Hakkari	Merzan City Football Field		2nd (Second League)
Kdz. Ereğlispor	Karadeniz Ereğli	Beyçayir Football Field		4th
Kireçburnu Spor	Istanbul	Çayırbaşı Stadium	5,000	5th
Konak Belediyespor	İzmir	Atatürk Stadyum 1 no'lu Yan Saha		3rd
Trabzon İdmanocağı	Trabzon	Yavuz Selim Stadium	1,820	8th

== League table ==
Pos	Team	Pld	W	D	L	GF	GA	GD	Pts	Qualification or relegation
1	Beşiktaş J.K.	19	14	3	2	62	13	+49	45	Champions League qualifying round
2	ALG Spor	19	13	3	3	60	17	+43	42	
3	Konak Belediyespor	18	12	3	3	47	20	+27	39	
4	Ataşehir Belediyespor	18	11	2	5	41	24	+17	35	
5	Kdz. Ereğlispor	18	8	4	6	23	19	+4	28	
6	Hakkarigücü Spor	18	7	5	6	34	21	+13	26	
7	Amed Sportif Faaliyetler	18	5	2	11	21	43	−22	17	
8	Kireçburnu Spor	18	4	2	12	19	57	−38	14	
9	Fatih Vatan Spor	18	4	2	12	19	58	−39	14	
10	Trabzon İdmanocağı	18	0	0	18	0	54	−54	0	Relegation to Second Football League

Updated to match(es) played on 28 April 2019. Source: Kadınlar 1. Lig Puan Cetveli ve Fikstürü TFF
Rules for classification: 1) Points; 2) head-to-head points; 3) head-to-head goal difference 4) not to declared in default 5) Third match in neutral ground

== Results ==
Home \ Away	ALG	AMD	ATA	BJK	FAT	HAK	KDZ	KIR	KON	TRA
ALG Spor	—	2–1	5–2	3–1	5–0	1–1	1–1	4–0	6–2	3–0
Amed SF	1–5	—	0–2	0–5	3–0	0–1	0–1	3–1	0–2	3–0
Ataşehir BS	1–4	3–0	—	0–2	7–1	1–1	1–0	3–1	3–1	3–0
Beşiktaş J.K.	2–0	5–0	2–1	—	8–1	1–0	5–0	7–1	1–1	3–0
Fatih Vatan Spor	0–5	1–4	0–3	0–3	—	3–2	1–1	1–0	2–2	3–0
Hakkarigücü Spor	3–2	6–1	2–2	1–1	4–1	—	3–0	2–3	1–2	3–0
Kdz. Ereğlispor	0–0	0–0	1–2	3–1	1–0	1–0	—	5–1	0–2	3–0
Kireçburnu Spor	0–9	2–2	0–3	0–9	3–1	0–0	1–3	—	0–1	3–0
Konak BS	1–2	7–0	4–1	2–2	7–1	2–1	1–0	4–0	—	3–0
Trabzon İO	0–3	0–3	0–3	0–3	0–3	0–3	0–3	0–3	0–3	—

Updated to match(es) played on 28 April 2019. Source: Kadınlar 1. Lig Puan Cetveli ve Fikstürü
Legend: Blue = home team win; Yellow = draw; Red = away team win.

1 – won by default 2 – default

== Top goalscorers ==
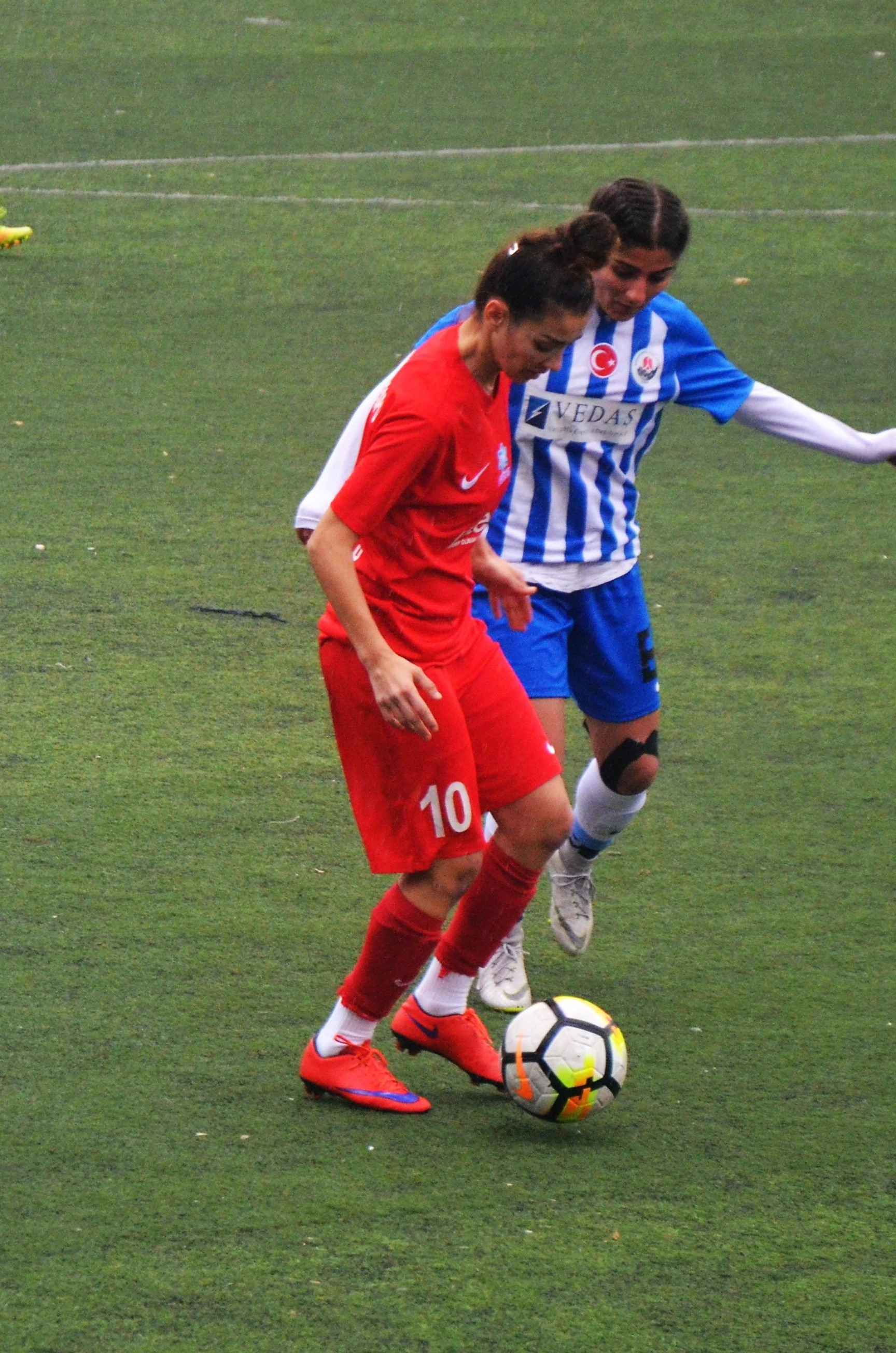
Mariem Houij (red) of Ataşehir Belediyespor in the 2018–19 season.

As of 12 May 2019.

Rank	Player	Team	GS	Pld	AG
1	(Tunisia) Mariem Houij	Ataşehir Belediyespor	15	16	0.94
2	(Turkey) Sevgi Çınar	ALG Spor	12	16	0.75
3	(Turkey) Kader Hançar	Konak Belediyespor	10	14	0.71
3	(Georgia (country)) Teona Bakradze	Hakkarigücü Spor	10	14	0.71
3	(Romania) Cosmina Dușa	Konak Belediyespor	10	15	0.67
6	(Turkey) Zelal Baturay	Amed S.K.	9	16	0.56
6	(Turkey) Gülbin Hız	ALG Spor	9	16	0.56
8	(Mali) Aissata Traoré	Beşiktaş J.K.	8	9	0.89
8	(Turkey) Gizem Gönültaş	Beşiktaş J.K.	8	17	0.47
10	(Ukraine) Tetyana Kozyrenko	ALG Spor	7	6	1.17

== Hat-tricks ==
Player	For	Against	Result	Date
(Tunisia) Mariem Houij	Ataşehir Belediyespor	Fatih Vatan Spor	3–0	28 October 2018
(Georgia (country)) Teona Bakradze	Hakkarigücü Spor	Amed S.K.	6–1	25 November 2018
(Turkey) Gizem Gönültaş	Beşiktaş J.K.	Kireçburnu Spor	7–1	10 February 2019
(Turkey) İlayda Civelek	Ataşehir Belediyespor	Fatih Vatan Spor	7–1	23 February 2019
(Turkey) Yağmur Uraz	ALG Spor	Kireçburnu Spor	9–0	10 March 2019
(Mali) Aissata Traoré	Beşiktaş J.K.	Fatih Vatan Spor	8–1	24 March 2019
(Ghana) Priscilla Hagan	Konak Belediyespor	Amed S.K.	7–0	24 March 2019
