= Yana Derkach =

Ukrainian footballer (born 1998)

Personal information
- Full name: Yana Volodymyrivna Derkach
- Date of birth: 10 July 1998 (age 28)
- Position: Midfielder

Team information
- Current team: Ankara BB Fomget
- Number: 99

Senior career*
Years	Team	Apps	(Gls)
2012–2015	Spartak ShVSM Chernihiv	5	(0)
2016–2018	Lehenda Chernihiv	?	(?)
2020–2021	ALG	4	(1)
2021–	AnkataBB Fomget	75	(5)

International career^{‡}
2016–2017	Ukraine U19	6	(0)
2020–	Ukraine	1	(0)
- * Club domestic league appearances and goals as of 15 October 2025 ‡ National team caps and goals as of 10 March 2020

Yana Volodymyrivna Derkach (Ukrainian: Яна Володимирівна Деркач, born 10 July 1998) is a Ukrainian women's football midfielder who plays for Ankara BB Fomget in the Turkish Super League, and for the Ukraine women's national team.

== Club career ==
Derkach played for the Oleshky-based club Voskhod Stara Maiachka in the 2019–20 Vyshcha Liha season of Ukrainian Women's League. She capped in 16 matches and scored one goal. Her team finished the season third placed.

By August 2020, Derkach moved to Turkey, and signed with the Gaziantep-based 2020–21 Turkish Women's League top club ALG Spor. Her team finished the season on third place after the play-offs.

The next season, she transferred to Ankara BB Fomget GS. She won the champions title in the 2022–23 season, became runners-up the next season, and again won the champions title in the 2024–25 season.

== Career statistics ==
As of 13 April 2025.

Club	Season	League			Continental		National		Total	
Club	Season	Division	Apps	Goals	Apps	Goals	Apps	Goals	Apps	Goals
ALG	2020–21	Women's League	4	1	–	–			4	1
Ankara BB Fomget	2021–22	Super League	9	0	–	–			9	0
Ankara BB Fomget	2022–23	Super League	23	5	–	–			23	5
Ankara BB Fomget	2023–24	Super League	27	0	–	–			27	0
Ankara BB Fomget	2024–25	Super League	14	0	–	–			14	0
Ankara BB Fomget	2025–26	Super League	2	0	–	–			2	0
Ankara BB Fomget	Total		75	5	–	–			75	5

== Honours ==
Turkish Women's Football First League

ALG
Third places (1): 2020–21

Turkish Women's Football Super League

Ankara BB Fomget
Champions (2): 2022–23, 2024–25
Runners-up (1): 2023–24
