= Heidi Ruth =

American soccer player (born 1996)

Personal information
- Full name: Heidi Lynnie Ruth
- Date of birth: October 4, 1996 (age 30)
- Place of birth: Punta Gorda, Florida, United States
- Height: 5 ft 7 in (1.70 m)
- Position: Defender

Team information
- Current team: Cruz Azul

College career
| Years | Team | Apps | (Gls) |
| 2014–2017 | Southeastern Fire | | |

Senior career*
| Years | Team | Apps | (Gls) |
| 2022–2023 | Ironi Ramat HaSharon FC | | |
| 2024–2026 | Ankara BB Fomget GSK | 40 | (2) |
| 2026– | Cruz Azul | 0 | (0) |
- * Club domestic league appearances and goals as of October 15, 2025

Heidi Lynnie Ruth (born October 4, 1996) is an American professional soccer player who plays as a defender for Liga Femenil club Cruz Azul.

== Personal life ==
Heidi Lynnie Ruth was born to Heather, in Punta Gorda, Florida.

After completing her high school education, she attended Clearwater Christian College between 2014 and 2015 before she studied in Southeastern University at Lakeland, Florida, majoring in exercise and sport science.

== Early years ==
Ruth is 5 ft 7 in (1.70 m) tall and plays as a defender.

She played for her college soccer team Southeastern Fire.

== Club career ==
In the 2022–23 season, Ruth played for the Israeli club Ironi Ramat HaSharon FC.

In late January 2024, she moved to Turkey and signed a deal with Ankara BB Fomget GSK for the second half of the 2023–24 Women's Super League. She appeared in 13 matches and scored one goal. Her team finished the season as runners-up. She won the champions title in the 2024–25 season.

== Honors ==
Ankara BB Fomget

- Turkish Women's Super League: 2024–25; runner-up: 2023–24
