= Başak İçinözbebek =

Turkish footballer (born 1994)

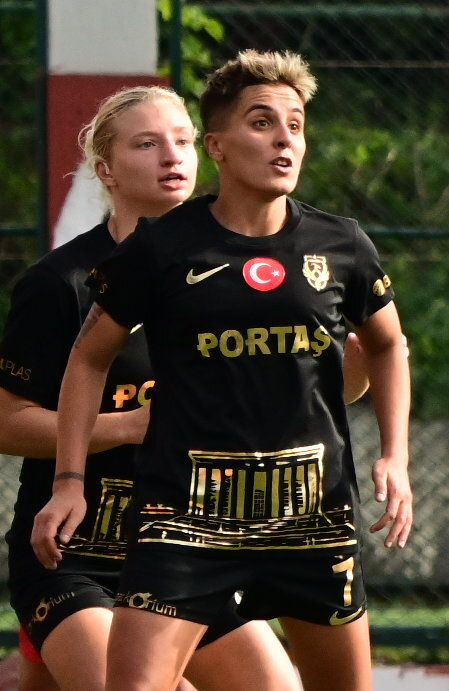
- Başak İçinözbebek of Ankara BB Fomget (November 2023).

Personal information
- Date of birth: February 13, 1994 (age 32)
- Place of birth: Mersin, Turkey
- Position: Midfielder

Team information
- Current team: Ankara BB Fomget
- Number: 7

Senior career*
| Years | Team | Apps | (Gls) |
| 2008–2010 | Mersingücü Cengiz Topelspor | 22 | (1) |
| 2010–2016 | Kdz. Ereğli | 107 | (35) |
| 2016–2017 | Trabzon İdmanocağı | 23 | (0) |
| 2017–2020 | Kdz. Ereğli | 48 | (3) |
| 2020–2021 | ALG | 6 | (0) |
| 2021– | Ankara BB Fomget | 85 | (21) |

International career^{‡}
| 2012 | Turkey U-19 | 12 | (0) |
| 2025– | Turkey | 2 | (0) |
- * Club domestic league appearances and goals as of 4 May 2025 ‡ National team caps and goals as of 4 April 2025

Başak İçinözbebek (born February 13, 1994) is a Turkish women's football midfielder currently playing in the Turkish Women's Super League for Ankara BB Fomget with jersey number 7. She was part of the Turkey women's national U-19 team.

== Early life ==
Başak İçinözbabek was born in Mersin on February 13, 1994. At the age of 10, she began football playing. She is a student of physical education and sports at Bülent Ecevit University in Zonguldak.

== Club career ==
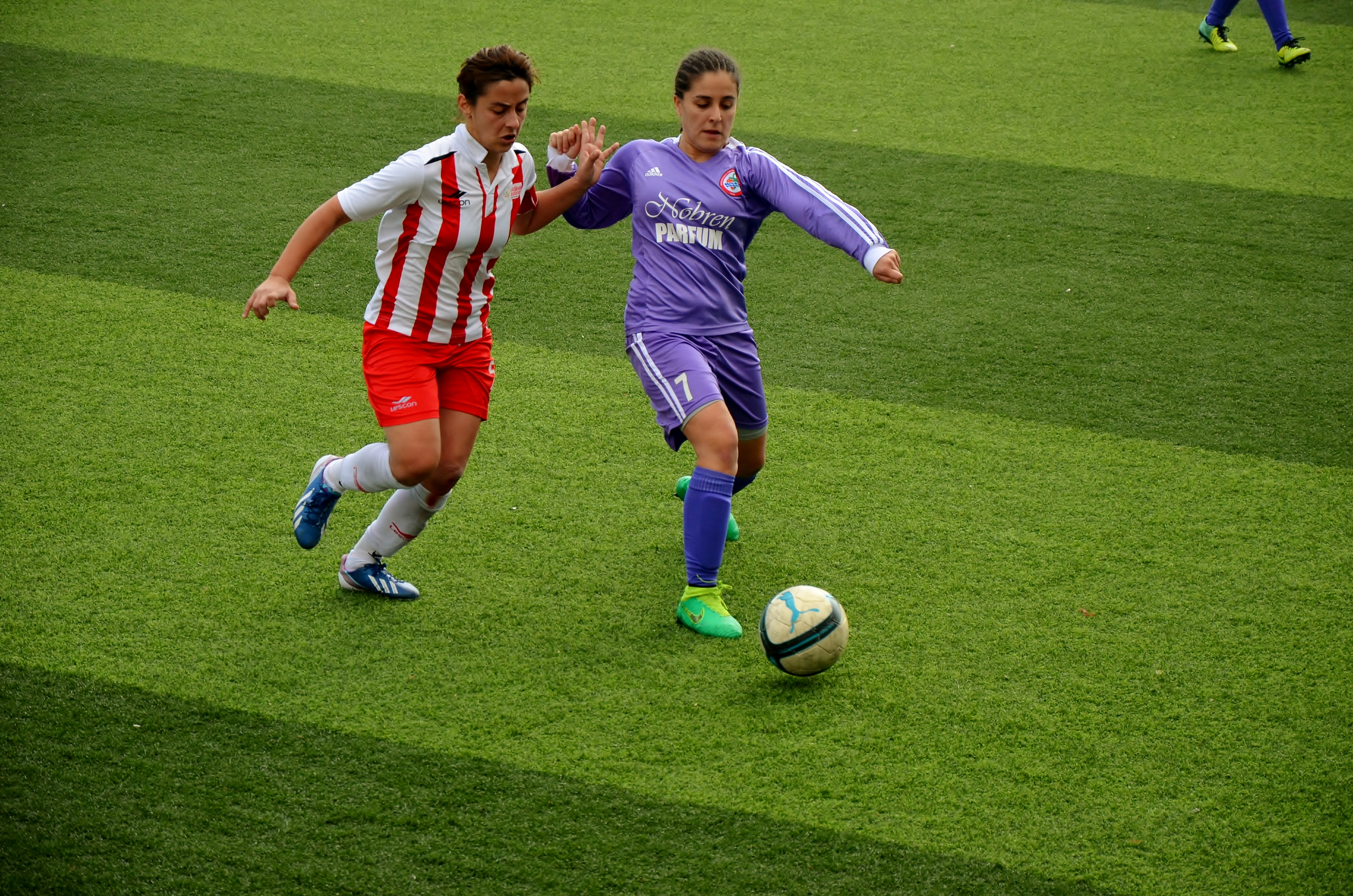
Başak İçinözbebek (lila) driving the ball for Kdz. Ereğli Belediye Spor in the 2014–15 season away match against Ataşehir Belediyespor.

Başak İçinözbebek obtained her license on February 7, 2008, for her hometown club Mersingüzü Cengiz Topelspor. Her team played the 2008–09 season in the Turkish Women's First League. The next season, they were relegated to the Women's Second League. Başak İçinözbebek transferred to Kdz. Ereğli Belediye Spor in the 2010–11 season. In the 2016–17 season, İçinözbebek transferred to Trabzon İdmanocağı.

İçinözbebek returned to her former club Kdz. Ereğlispor in the 2017–18 season. She captains the team.

In the 2020-21 Turkish Women's Football League season, she played for the Gaziantep-based club ALG Spor. Her team finished the season at third place. She transferred to Fomget Dençlik ve Spor in Ankara to paly in the 2021–22 Women's Super League season. She won the champions title in the 2022–23 season, became runners-up the next season, and again won the champions title in the 2024–25 season.

== International career ==
İçinözbebek was admitted to the Turkey women's national U-19 team, and debuted in the match against Slovakia at the 2012 Kuban Spring Tournament on March 7, 2012. She participated at the 2013 UEFA Women's U-19 Championship First qualifying round – Group 5 matches. She capped 12 times for the women's nationals U-19 team.

She was called up to the Turkey women's national team despite her health problem with severe headache. However, she failed to join the squad. She debuted in the national team at the 2025 UEFA Women's Nations League B match against Ireland on 21 Gebrıary 2025.

== Career statistics ==
As of 4 May 2025.

| Club | Season | League | | | Continental | | National | | Total | |
| Club | Season | Division | Apps | Goals | Apps | Goals | Apps | Goals | Apps | Goals |
|---|---|---|---|---|---|---|---|---|---|---|
| Mersingücü Cengiz Topelspor | 2008–09 | First League | 15 | 1 | – | – | 0 | 0 | 15 | 1 |
| Mersingücü Cengiz Topelspor | 2009–10 | Second League | 7 | 0 | – | – | 0 | 0 | 7 | 0 |
| Mersingücü Cengiz Topelspor | Total | | 22 | 1 | – | – | 0 | 0 | 22 | 1 |
| Kdz. Ereğli | 2010–11 | Second League | 22 | 10 | – | – | 0 | 0 | 22 | 10 |
| Kdz. Ereğli | 2011–12 | First league | 21 | 8 | – | – | 7 | 0 | 28 | 8 |
| Kdz. Ereğli | 2012–13 | First League | 17 | 5 | – | – | 5 | 0 | 22 | 5 |
| Kdz. Ereğli | 2013–14 | First League | 15 | 5 | – | – | 0 | 0 | 15 | 5 |
| Kdz. Ereğli | 2014–15 | First League | 16 | 3 | – | – | 0 | 0 | 16 | 3 |
| Kdz. Ereğli | 2015–16 | First League | 16 | 4 | – | – | 0 | 0 | 16 | 4 |
| Kdz. Ereğli | Total | | 107 | 35 | – | – | 12 | 0 | 119 | 35 |
| Trabzon İdmanocağı | 2016–17 | First League | 23 | 0 | – | – | 0 | 0 | 23 | 0 |
| Kdz. Ereğli | 2017–18 | First League | 17 | 1 | – | – | 0 | 0 | 17 | 1 |
| Kdz. Ereğli | 2018–19 | First League | 15 | 2 | – | – | 0 | 0 | 15 | 2 |
| Kdz. Ereğli | 2019–20 | First League | 16 | 0 | – | – | 0 | 0 | 16 | 0 |
| Kdz. Ereğli | Total | | 48 | 3 | – | – | 0 | 0 | 48 | 3 |
| ALG Spor | 2020–21 | First League | 6 | 0 | – | – | 0 | 0 | 6 | 0 |
| Ankara BB Fomget | 2021–22 | Super League | 14 | 7 | – | – | 0 | 0 | 14 | 7 |
| Ankara BB Fomget | 2022–23 | Super League | 21 | 5 | – | – | 0 | 21| | 5 | |
| Ankara BB Fomget | 2023–24 | Super League | 27 | 5 | – | – | 0 | 0 | 27 | 5 |
| Ankara BB Fomget | 2024–25 | Super League | 23 | 4 | – | – | 2 | 0 | 25 | 4 |
| Ankara BB Fomget | Total | | 85 | 21 | – | – | 2 | 0 | 87 | 21 |
| Career total | | | 291 | 60 | – | – | 14 | 0 | 305 | 60 |

== Honors ==
Turkish Women's First League

Kdz. Ereğli
Third places (2): 2011–12, 2012–13

ALG
Third places (1): 2020–21

Turkish Women's Super League

Ankara BB Fomget
Champions (2): 2022–23, 2024–25
Runners-up (1): 2023–24
