= 2025–26 Turkish Women's Football Super League =

Turkish Women's Football Super League
- Season: 2025–26
- Dates: 21 September 2025 – 24 May 2026
- Champions: Fenerbahçe
- Relegated: Gaziantep ALG; Bornova Hitab; Beylerbeyi
- Champions League: Fenerbahçe
- Matches: 237
- Goals: 913 (3.85 per match)
- Top goalscorer: Natalia Oleszkiewicz (30 goals)
- Biggest home win: Fenerbahçe 18–0 ALG (25 January 2026)
- Biggest away win: Şile BilgiDoğa 0–20 Trabzonspor (24 May 2026)
- Highest scoring: Şile BilgiDoğa 0–20 Trabzonspor (24 May 2026)
- Longest winning run: 11 matches Fenerbahçe
- Longest unbeaten run: 25 matches Fenerbahçe
- Longest winless run: 28 matches Bornova Hitab
- Longest losing run: 28 matches Bornova Hitab

The 2025–26 Turkish Women's Football Super League (Turkish: Turkcell Kadın Futbol Süper Ligi 2025–2026 Sezonu) was the 30th season of Turkey's top women's football league.

A total of 16 teams, 13 from the 2024–25 Women's Super League season and three from the 2024–25 Turkish Women's Football First League season, compete in a round-robin format. The season began on 21 September 2025 and ended on 24 May 2026, with a season's break between 28 December 2025 and 25 January 2026.

Fenerbahçe won their first ever title with two matches to spare on 10 May 2026, following a 7–0 away win against Giresun Sanayi.

== Teams ==
Location of teams in Turkey in the 2025–26 season of Turkish Women's Football Super League
Location of teams in Istanbul in the 2025–26 season of Turkish Women's Football Super League

Season 2025–26
| Team | Hometown | Ground | Capacity | 2024–25 finish |
|---|---|---|---|---|
| 1207 Antalya Spor | Antalya | Zeytinköy Stadium's Field #3 | | Champion (First League) |
| ALG | Gaziantep | Batur Stadium | | 7th |
| Amed | Diyarbakır | Diyarbakır Stadium | 33,000 | 11th |
| Beşiktaş | Istanbul | İBB GOP Halit Kıvanç City Stadium | 5,000 | 3rd |
| Beylerbeyi | Istanbul | Beylerbeyi 75. Yıl Stadium | 5,000 | 6th |
| Bornova Hitab | İzmir | Bornova District Stadium | | 12th |
| Fatih Vatan | Istanbul | İBB Balat Sdium | | 8th |
| Fenerbahçe | Istanbul | Fenerbahçe Lefter Küçükandonyadis Stadium | 200 | Runners-up |
| ABB Fomget | Ankara | Osmanlı Stadium | 18,029 | Champion |
| Giresun Sanayi | Giresun | Giresun 75. Yıl Futbol Sahası | | Runners-up (First League) |
| Galatasaray | Istanbul | Florya Metin Oktay Facilities | | 4th |
| Hakkarigücü | Hakkari | Merzan City Football Field | | 9th |
| Şile BilgiDoğa | Istanbul | Şile District Stadium | | 13th |
| Trabzonspor | Trabzon | Mehmet Ali Yılmaz Stadium | 3,000 | 5th |
| Ünye Kadın | Ordu | Ünye District Stadium | 10,340 | 10th |
| Yüksekova | Hakkari | Yüksekova District Stadium | 1,000 | 3rd (First League) |

=== Personnel and kits ===
| Team | Manager | Captain | Kit manufacturer | Main shirt sponsor |
|---|---|---|---|---|
| 1207 Antalya Spor | (Turkey) Hüseyin Türk | (Turkey) Bahar Güvenç | Hummel | |
| ALG | N/A | N/A | N/A | |
| Amed | (Turkey) Seyid Ahmet Hafız | (Turkey) Öznur Taş | Nike | MED A.Ş. |
| Beşiktaş | (Turkey) Sarp Yiğit | (Turkey) Başak Gündoğdu | Adidas | |
| Beylerbeyi | N/A | N/A | N/A | |
| Bornova Hitab | N/A | N/A | N/A | |
| Şile BilgiDoğa | (Turkey) Kerem Güven | (Turkey) Çiğdem Belci | Joma | Ankatek |
| Fatih Vatan | (Turkey) Çağdaş Töre | (Turkey) Şehriban Dülek | Foreak | Lutz |
| Fenerbahçe | (Turkey) Gökhan Bozkaya | (Turkey) Yağmur Uraz | Adidas | arsaVev |
| ABB Fomget | (Turkey) Ali Eraslan | (Montenegro) Armisa Kuč | Nike | Belplas |
| Giresun Sanayi | (Turkey) Hilmi Bugüner | (Turkey) Neslihan Demirdöğen | Hummel | koruncuk |
| Galatasaray | (Germany) Gábor Gallai | (Turkey) Ebru Topçu | Puma | Gain |
| Hakkarigücü | (Turkey) Cemile Timur | (Turkey) Meryem Küçükbirinci | Hummel | VED A.Ş. |
| Trabzonspor | (Turkey) Bahar Özgüvenç | (Turkey) Fatma Kara | Joma | |
| Ünye Kadın | (Turkey) Muhammet Kışla | (Turkey) Nagehan Akşan | Hummel | You |
| Yüksekova | (Turkey) Bayram Yıldırım | (Turkey) Beyza Kocatürk | Adidas | AJet |

== League table ==
| Pos | Team | Pld | W | D | L | GF | GA | GD | Pts | Qualification or relegation |
|---|---|---|---|---|---|---|---|---|---|---|
| 1 | Fenerbahçe (C) | 30 | 27 | 2 | 1 | 136 | 9 | +127 | 83 | Qualification for the Champions League second qualifying round |
| 2 | Trabzonspor | 30 | 24 | 4 | 2 | 106 | 12 | +94 | 76 | |
| 3 | Galatasaray | 30 | 24 | 2 | 4 | 104 | 19 | +85 | 74 | |
| 4 | ABB Fomget | 30 | 20 | 3 | 7 | 83 | 24 | +59 | 63 | |
| 5 | Yüksekova | 30 | 18 | 7 | 5 | 52 | 16 | +36 | 61 | |
| 6 | Beşiktaş | 30 | 17 | 5 | 8 | 93 | 32 | +61 | 56 | |
| 7 | Amed | 30 | 17 | 3 | 10 | 76 | 34 | +42 | 54 | |
| 8 | Hakkarigücü | 30 | 14 | 6 | 10 | 52 | 34 | +18 | 48 | |
| 9 | Ünye Kadın | 30 | 13 | 4 | 13 | 52 | 48 | +4 | 43 | |
| 10 | Giresun Sanayi | 30 | 12 | 3 | 15 | 41 | 70 | −29 | 39 | |
| 11 | Şile BilgiDoğa | 30 | 9 | 2 | 19 | 37 | 110 | −73 | 29 | |
| 12 | Fatih Vatan | 30 | 8 | 4 | 18 | 37 | 92 | −55 | 25 (Note: Fatih Vatan were deducted 3 points by the decision of the Federation.) | |
| 13 | 1207 Antalya | 30 | 7 | 3 | 20 | 30 | 88 | −58 | 21 (Note: 1207 Antalya were deducted 3 points by the decision of the Federation.) | |
| 14 | Gaziantep ALG (R) | 29 | 3 | 0 | 26 | 14 | 160 | −146 | 6 (Note: On 27 February 2026, following a decision by the Amateur Football Disciplinary Committee, Gaziantep ALG was expelled from the league, with all of their matches forfeited and recorded as 3–0 victories for their opponents. 3 points deducted by the decision of the Federation.) | Relegation to the First League |
| 15 | Bornova Hitab (R) | 28 | 0 | 0 | 28 | 0 | 84 | −84 | 0 (Note: On 17 September 2025, following a decision by the Amateur Football Disciplinary Committee, Bornova Hitab Spor was expelled from the league, with all of their matches forfeited and recorded as 3–0 victories for their opponents.) | Relegation to the First League |
| 16 | Beylerbeyi (R) | 27 | 0 | 0 | 27 | 0 | 81 | −81 | −3 (Note: On 3 October 2025, following a decision by the Amateur Football Disciplinary Committee, Beylerbeyi was expelled from the league, with all of their matches forfeited and recorded as 3–0 victories for their opponents. 3 points deducted by the decision of the Federation.) | Relegation to the First League |

Source: TFF
(C) Champions; (R) Relegated

== Season statistics ==
=== Top goalscorers ===
As of 24 May 2026

| Rank | Player | Team | Goals |
|---|---|---|---|
| 1 | (Poland) Natalia Oleszkiewicz | Trabzonspor | 30 |
| 2 | (Cameroon) Marie Ngah | Galatasaray | 27 |
| 3 | (Czech Republic) Andrea Stašková | Fenerbahçe | 20 |
| 4 | (Tunisia) Mariem Houij | Yüksekova | 19 |
| 4 | (Cameroon) Geneviève Ngo | Amed | 19 |
| 4 | (Kosovo) Donjeta Halilaj | Trabzonspor | 19 |
| 7 | (Turkey) Yağmur Uraz | Fenerbahçe | 16 |
| 8 | (Costa Rica) María Paula Salas | Fenerbahçe | 15 |
| 9 | (Montenegro) Armisa Kuč | Ankara BB Fomget | 14 |
| 9 | (Italy) Valentina Giacinti | Galatasaray | 14 |
| 11 | (Ghana) Elizabeth Owusuaa | Hakkarigücü | 13 |

=== Clean sheets ===
As of 1 February 2026

| Rank | Player | Club | Clean sheets |
|---|---|---|---|
| 1 | (Turkey) Selda Akgöz | Ankara BB Fomget | 5 |
| 1 | (Sweden) Angel Mukasa | Galatasaray | 5 |
| 3 | (Turkey) Göknur Güleryüz | Fenerbahçe | 4 |
| 3 | (Kosovo) Florentina Kolgeci | Amed | 4 |
| 3 | (Azerbaijan) Aytaj Sharifova | Yüksekova | 4 |
| 6 | (Turkey) Ezgi Çağlar | Beşiktaş | 3 |
| 7 | (Azerbaijan) Nargiz Aliyeva | Fatih Vatan | 2 |
| 7 | (Brazil) Bia Nicoleti | Hakkarigücü Spor | 2 |
| 7 | (Azerbaijan) Sude Topçu | 1207 Antalya Spor | 2 |
| 7 | (Turkey) Gamze Nur Yaman | Trabzonspor | 2 |

=== Hat-tricks and more ===
| Player | Sco. | For | Against | Res. | Date | Ref. |
|---|---|---|---|---|---|---|
| (Costa Rica) María Paula Salas | 5 | Fenerbahçe | ALG | 15–0 | 21 September 2025 | |
| (Azerbaijan) Esra Manya | 3 | Beşiktaş | ALG | 15–0 | 28 September 2025 | |
| (Bosnia and Herzegovina) Marija Aleksić | 3 | Beşiktaş | ALG | 15–0 | 28 September 2025 | |
| (Italy) Valentina Giacinti | 4 | Galatasaray | ALG | 17–0 | 15 October 2025 | |
| (Cameroon) Marie Ngah | 5 | Galatasaray | ALG | 17–0 | 15 October 2025 | |
| (Tunisia) Mariem Houij | 3 | Yüksekova | Giresun Sanayi | 5–0 | 15 October 2025 | |
| (Montenegro) Jelena Karličić | 3 | Fatih Vatan | ALG | 9–2 | 2 November 2025 | |
| (Burkina Faso) Juliette Nana | 3 | Fatih Vatan | ALG | 9–2 | 2 November 2025 | |
| (Czech Republic) Andrea Stašková | 3 | Fenerbahçe | Şile BilgiDoğa | 5–0 | 23 November 2025 | |
| (Poland) Natalia Oleszkiewicz | 4 | Trabzonspor | Fatih Vatan | 12–0 | 14 December 2025 | |
| (Kosovo) Donjeta Halilaj | 3 | Trabzonspor | Fatih Vatan | 12–0 | 14 December 2025 | |
| (Czech Republic) Andrea Stašková | 3 | Fenerbahçe | ALG | 18–0 | 25 January 2026 | |
| (Costa Rica) María Paula Salas | 4 | Fenerbahçe | ALG | 18–0 | 25 January 2026 | |
| (Turkey) Yağmur Uraz | 3 | Fenerbahçe | ALG | 18–0 | 25 January 2026 | |
| (Cameroon) Marie Ngah | 3 | Galatasaray | Fatih Vatan | 9–0 | 1 February 2026 | |
| (Montenegro) Armisa Kuč | 4 | Ankara BB Fomget | 1207 Antalya | 8–0 | 8 February 2026 | |
| (Cameroon) Genevieve Ngo Mbeleck | 4 | Amed | Giresun Sanayi | 6–1 | 8 February 2026 | |
| (Tunisia) Mariem Houij | 4 | Yüksekova | Şile BilgiDoğa | 4–0 | 19 February 2026 | |
| (Turkey) Buket Karadağ | 3 | Ünye Kadın | Şile BilgiDoğa | 7–0 | 12 March 2026 | |
| (Turkey) Melike Dinçel | 3 | Şile BilgiDoğa | Giresun Sanayi | 3–4 | 17 March 2026 | |
| (Ghana) Elizabeth Owusuaa | 5 | Hakkarigücü | 1207 Antalya | 7–1 | 28 March 2026 | |
| (Cameroon) Marie Ngah | 3 | Galatasaray | Giresun Sanayi | 8–0 | 3 April 2026 | |
| (Turkey) Yağmur Uraz | 5 | Fenerbahçe | Şile BilgiDoğa | 11–0 | 22 April 2026 | |
| (Cameroon) Genevieve Ngo Mbeleck | 3 | Amed | 1207 Antalya | 3–0 | 2 May 2026 | |
| (Kosovo) Donjeta Halilaj | 5 | Trabzonspor | Giresun Sanayi | 10–0 | 16 May 2026 | |
| (Poland) Natalia Oleszkiewicz | 3 | Trabzonspor | Giresun Sanayi | 10–0 | 16 May 2026 | |
| (Turkey) Başak Gündoğdu | 3 | Beşiktaş | Şile BilgiDoğa | 11–0 | 17 May 2026 | |
| (Poland) Natalia Oleszkiewicz | 9 | Trabzonspor | Şile BilgiDoğa | 20–0 | 24 May 2026 | |
| (Turkey) Azra Ardos | 3 | Trabzonspor | Şile BilgiDoğa | 20–0 | 24 May 2026 | |
| (Cameroon) Genevieve Ngo Mbeleck | 3 | Amed | Ünye Kadın | 4–5 | 24 May 2026 | |
