= Çiğdem Belci =

Turkish women's footballer

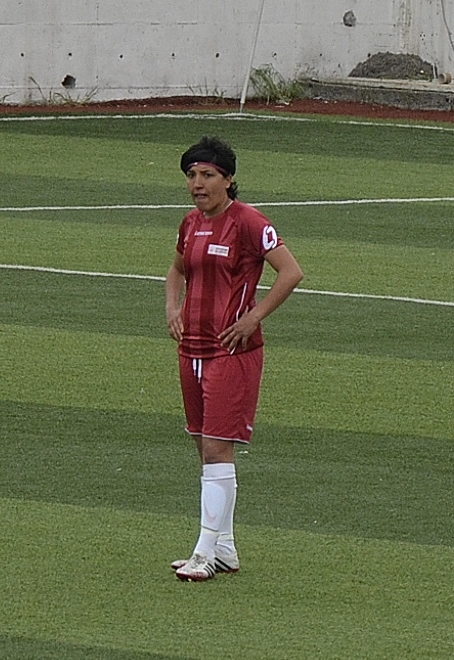
- Çiğdem Belci for Ataşehir Belediyespor in the 2013–14 season.

Personal information
- Date of birth: 17 June 1987 (age 39)
- Place of birth: Mersin, Turkey
- Position: Defender

Team information
- Current team: Sultanbeyli Gücü
- Number: 5

Senior career*
Years	Team	Apps	(Gls)
1999–2008	Mersin Camspor	11	(2)
2008–2009	Mersingücü Cengiz Topelspor	17	(4)
2009–2010	Trabzonspor	17	(3)
2010–2015	Ataşehir Belediyespor	88	(11)
2015–2016	Kireçburnu Spor	18	(5)
2016–2018	Ataşehir Belediyespor	41	(2)
2018–2022	Beşiktaş	49	(6)
2022–2023	Fatih Karagümrük	15	(1)
2023–2025	Beylerbeyi	38	(0)
2025	Galatasaray	0	(0)
2025–2026	Çekmeköy BilgiDoğa	17	(0)
2026	Şile BilgiDoğa	2	(0)
2026–	Sultanbeyli Gücü	9	(0)

International career^{‡}
2003	Turkey U-19	5	(0)
2006–2020	Turkey	48	(0)
- * Club domestic league appearances and goals as of 1 November 2026 ‡ National team caps and goals as of 17 January 2020

Çiğdem Belci (born 17 June 1987) is a Turkish women's football defender currently playing in the Women's Super League for Sultanbeyli Gücü in Istanbul with jersey number 5. She was a member of the Turkish national team between 2003 and 2020.

== Early life ==
Çiğdem Belci was born on 17 June 1987 in Mersin, southern Turkey. She has three older sisters and a younger brother, who follows her footsteps playing in a feeder club in Mersin.

At the age of eight, she began playing football with boys in the neighborhood. Convinced by her daughter's interest, the father took her then to Mersin Camspor, and registered her. However, feared of her daughter's future, he wanted her leave the club. Her mother supported Çiğdem, and was able to stop the father's pressure. Her father changed his mind when she transferred to successful clubs and continued with her higher education.

She studied physical education and sports at Ondokuz Mayıs University in Samsun. After graduation, she was appointed a teacher.

== Club career ==
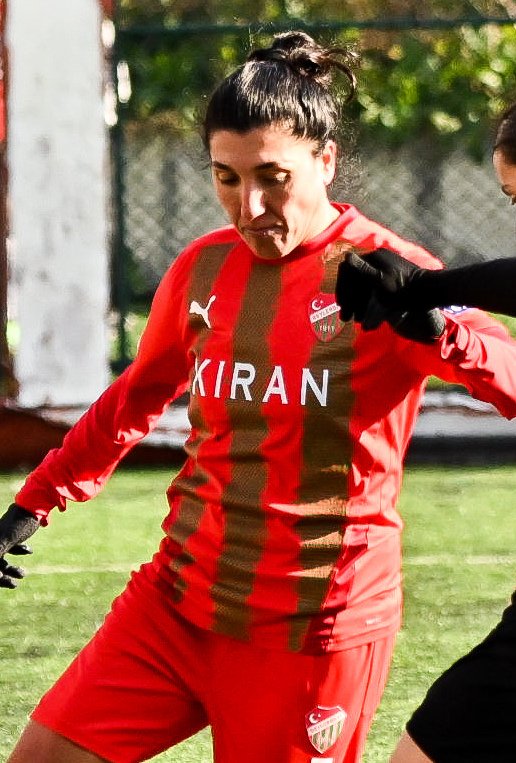
Çiğdem Belci playing for Beylerbeyi in the 2023–24 season.

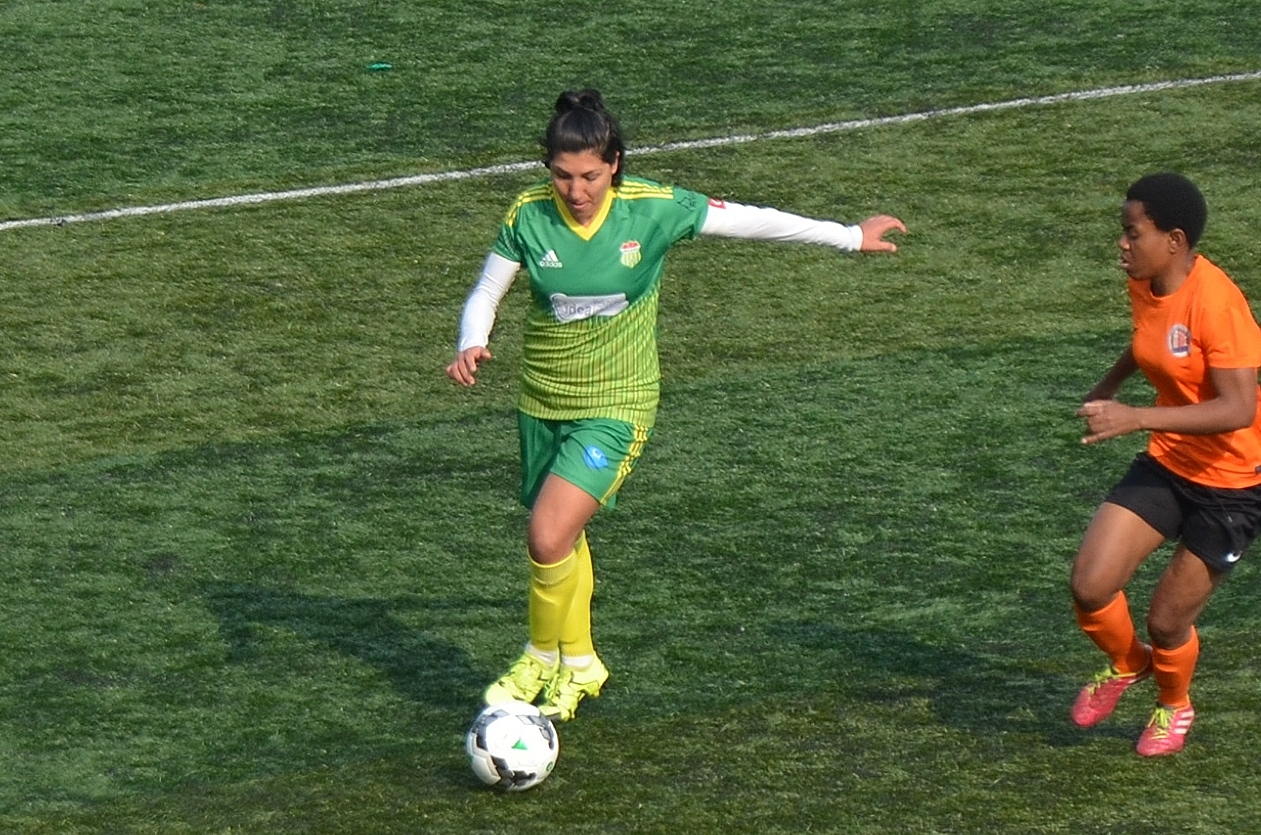
Çiğdem Belci playing for Kireçburnu Spor in the 2015–16 season.

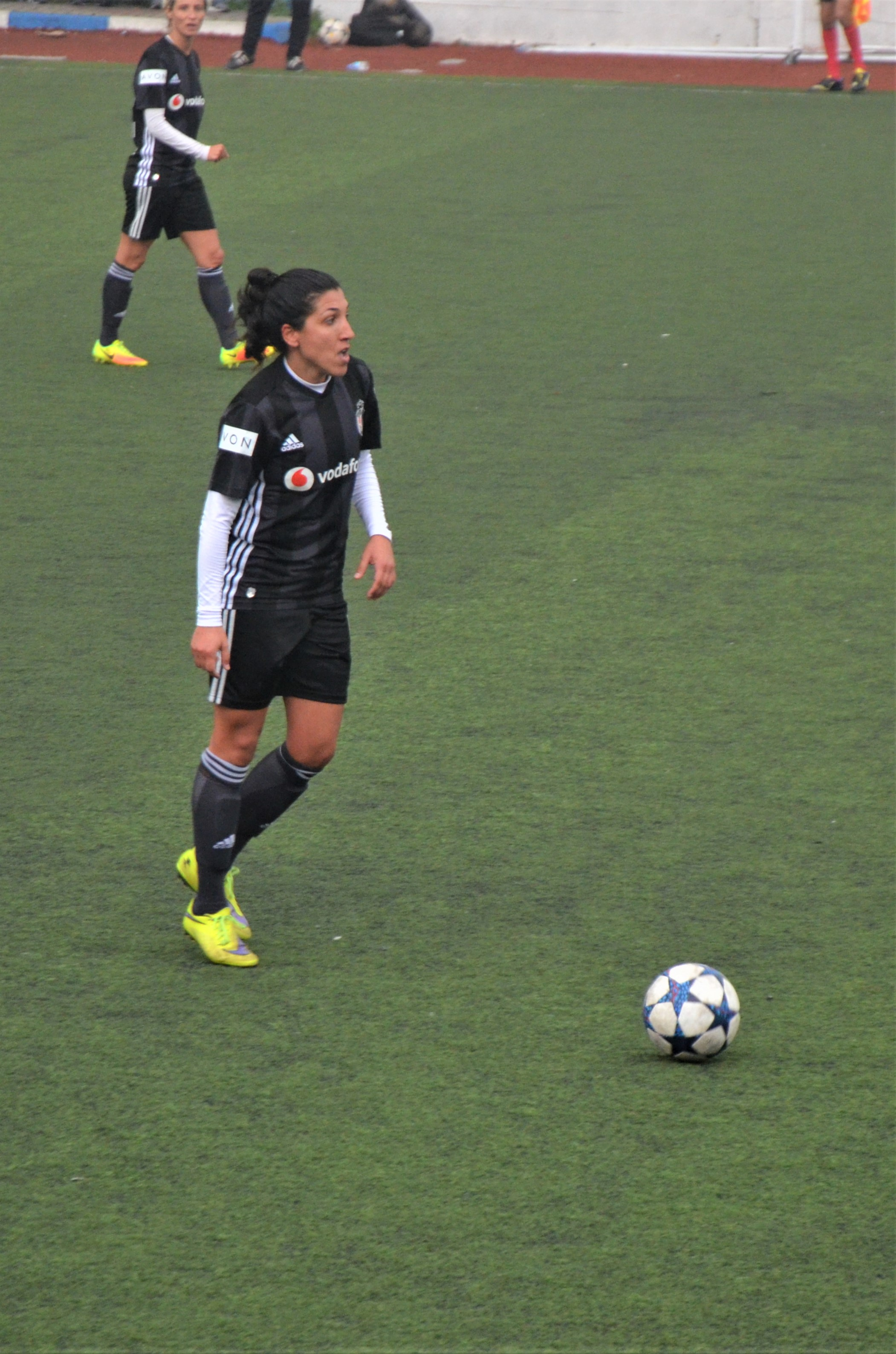
Çiğdem Belci of Beşiktaş J.K. in the 2018–19 Women's First League s season.

Çiğdem Belci obtained her license from her hometown club Mersin Camspor on 1 September 1999, where she played until the end of 2007–08 season and capped 13 times scoring three goals. She moved to Mersingücü Cengiz Topelspor and after one season, she transferred to the Black Sea club Trabzonspor for the 2009–10 season.

The next season, Belci signed for the Istanbul-based club Ataşehirspor, and enjoyed two consecutive league championships in 2011 and 2012. She debuted in the UEFA Women's Champions League playing against Lithuanian side Gintra Universitetas on 11 August 2011. She participated in three group matches of the qualifying round. The next year, she played again in three qualifying round matches. However, her team was not successful either in 2011–12 or in 2012–13 to advance further to the knockout stage.

For the 2015–16 season, she signed with Kireçburnu Spor, which was recently promoted to the Women's First League. Belci serves as the captain of the team. In the 2016–17 season, she returned to her former club Ataşehir Belediyespor.

=== Beşiktaş ===
In the 2018–19 league season, she transferred to Beşiktaş J.K. She enjoyed the champion title of her team in the 2018–19 season. She took part at the 2019–20 UEFA Women's Champions League – Group 9 matches. She played in one match of the 2021–22 UEFA Women's Champions League qualifying rounds.

=== Fatih Karagümrük ===
In the 2022–23 Super League season, she transferred to Fatih Karagümrük S.K.

=== Beylerbeyi ===
End July 2023, she transferred to Beylerbeyi, which play for the first time in the Super League

=== Galatasaray ===
On 17 February 2025 she signed a contract with Galatasaray until the end of the 2024–25 season. On 20 July 2025, the club announced that Belci is leaving.

== International career ==
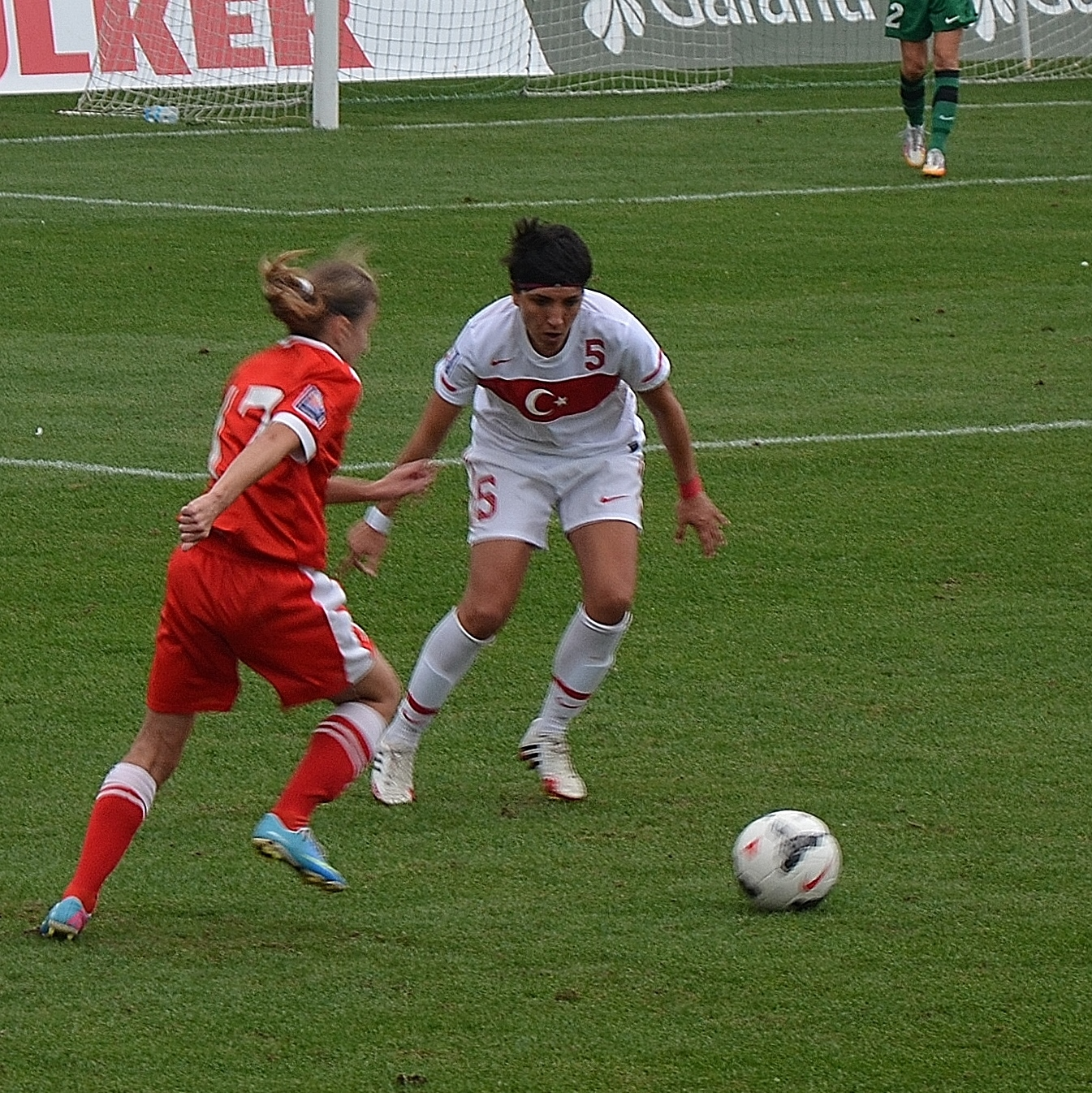
Çiğdem Belci (white) in the 2015 FIFA Women's World Cup qualification – UEFA Group 6 match against Belarus.

Belci made her first appearance in the Turkey women's U-19 national team in the match against Romania juniors at the International Norte Alentejano Tournament held in Portugal on 28 May 2003. She capped five times in the junior women's national team.

On 6 August 2003, she debuted in the national team playing in the friendly match against Russia. Her international participations followed at the UEFA Women's Euro 2009 qualifying round (Northern Ireland, Croatia and Georgia), at the UEFA Support International Tournaments (Bulgaria, Azerbaijan, Estonia, Croatia, Malta, Latvia and Macedonia). Belci played in seven of the eight matches at the 2011 FIFA Women's World Cup qualification – UEFA Group 5 matches (Spain, England, Malta and Austria) as well as in eight of ten matches at the UEFA Women's Euro 2013 qualifying – Group 2 (Spain, Kazakhstan, Romania, Germany and Switzerland). In 2013, she participated in all the three 2015 FIFA Women's World Cup qualification – UEFA Group 6 matches against English and Montenegron women.

== Career statistics ==
As of match played 1 November 2026.

Club	Season	League			Continental		National		Total	
Club	Season	Division	Apps	Goals	Apps	Goals	Apps	Goals	Apps	Goals
Mersin Camspor	1999–2008	First League	11	2	–	–	12	0	25	2
Mersingücü Cengiz Topelspor	2008–09	First League	17	4	–	–	4	0	21	4
Trabzonspor	2009–10	First League	17	3	–	–	4	0	21	3
Ataşehir Belediyespor	2010–11	First League	22	6	–	–	4	0	26	6
Ataşehir Belediyespor	2011–12	First League	19	3	3	0	7	0	29	3
Ataşehir Belediyespor	2012–13	First League	17	1	3	0	2	0	22	1
Ataşehir Belediyespor	2013–14	First League	15	1	–	–	7	0	22	1
Ataşehir Belediyespor	2014–15	First League	15	0	–	–	3	0	18	0
Ataşehir Belediyespor	Total		88	11	6	0	23	0	117	11
Kireçburnu Spor	2015–16	First League	18	5	–	–	9	0	27	5
Ataşehir Belediyespor	2016–17	First League	23	0	–	–	0	0	23	0
Ataşehir Belediyespor	2017–18	First League	18	2	–	–	0	0	18	2
Ataşehir Belediyespor	2018–19	First League	0	0	3	0	0	0	3	0
Ataşehir Belediyespor	Total		41	2	3	0	0	0	44	2
Beşiktaş	2018–19	First League	16	4	–	–	0	0	16	4
Beşiktaş	2019–20	First League	11	2	3	0	1	0	15	2
Beşiktaş	2020–21	First League	6	0	0	0	0	0	6	0
Beşiktaş	2021–22	Super League	16	0	1	0	0	0	17	0
Beşiktaş	Total		49	6	4	0	1	0	55	6
Fatih Karagümrük	2022–23	Super League	15	1	–	-	0	0	15	1
Beylerbeyi	2023–24	Super League	29	0	-	-	0	0	29	0
Beylerbeyi	2024–25	Super League	9	0	-	-	0	!0	9	0
Beylerbeyi	Total		38	0	-	-	1	0	38	0
Galatasaray	2024–25	Super League	0	0	-	-	0	0	0	0
Çeköeköy BilgiDoğa	2025–26	Super League	17	0	-	-	0	0	17	0
Şile BilgiDoğa	2025–26	Super League	2	0	-	-	0	0	2	0
	Total		19	0	-	-	0	0	19	0
Sultanbeyli Gücü	2026–27	Super League	9	0	-	-	0	0	9	0
Career total			322	34	13	0	54	0	389	34

== Honours ==
Turkish Women's First Football League

Ataşehir Belediyespor
Winners (3): 2010–11, 2011–12, 2017–18
Runners-up (3): 2012–13, 2013–14, 2014–15
Third places (1): 2016–17

Beşiktaş J.K.
Winners (2): 2018–19, 2020–21
