= Judith Okah =

Nigerian footballer (born 2006)

Personal information
- Full name: Adaobi Judith Okah
- Date of birth: 29 June 2006 (age 20)
- Place of birth: Ebonyi, Nigeria
- Height: 1.60 m (5 ft 3 in)
- Position: Forward

Team information
- Current team: Şile BilgiDoğa
- Number: 26

Youth career
- Remo Stars

College career
Years	Team	Apps	(Gls)
2025–2026	Pittsburgh Panthers		

Senior career*
Years	Team	Apps	(Gls)
2026	Kayseri	2	(0)
2026–	Şile BilgiDoğa	4	(1)

International career^{‡}
2024	Nigeria U20	4	(1)
- * Club domestic league appearances and goals as of 2 November 2026 ‡ National team caps and goals as of 21 March 2024

Adaobi Judith Okah (born 29 June 2006) is a Nigerian women's football forward who plays in the Turkish Women's Super League for Şile BilgiDoğa. She was part of the Nigeria women's national U20 team.

== Club career ==
Okah played for Remo Stars in her country. During he higher education in the United States, she was part of the college soccer team Pittsburgh Panthers between 2025 and 2026.

Late August 2026, she moved to Turkey, and signed a one-year contract with Kayseri. She played her first match in the Women's Super League on 31 August. After appearing in two matches, she transferred to the Istanbul based club Şile BilgiDoğa.

== International career ==
Okah was selected to the Nigeria women's national U20 team, nicknamed the Falconets, in November 2023 for the third round match of the 2024 African U-20 Women's World Cup qualification. She was part of the Nigeria women's U20 team at the Football at the 2023 African Games held in Ghana in March 2024. She appeared in four games and scored one goal. Her team lost the finale against Ghana U20 in the extra-time, and took the silver medal.

== Personal life ==
Adaobi Judith was born in Ebonyi, Nigeria on 29 June 2006.

Between 2025 and 2026, she attended University of Pittsburgh in the United States.

== Honours ==
Nigeria women's national U20 team
(silver) (1): Football at the 2023 African Games
