= 2024–25 Turkish Women's Football Super League =

Turkish Women's Football Super League
- Season: 2024–25
- Dates: 8 September 2024 – 4 May 2025
- Champions: Ankara BB Fomget
- Promoted: Bornova Hitab; Ünye Gücü F.K.
- Relegated: Kdz. Ereğli
- Champions League: Ankara BB Fomget
- Matches: 182
- Goals: 680 (3.74 per match)
- Top goalscorer: (Montenegro) Armisa Kuč (30 goals)
- Biggest home win: 19-0 (27 March 2025 Ankara BB Fomget)
- Biggest away win: 15-0 (20 April 2025 Ünye Kadın)
- Highest scoring: 19 (27 March 2025 Ankara BB Fomget)
- Longest winning run: 13 (Ankara BB Fomget)
- Longest unbeaten run: 14 (Ankara BB Fomget)
- Longest winless run: 26 (Kdz. Ereğli)
- Longest losing run: 26 (Kdz. Ereğli)
- All statistics correct as of 4 May 2025.

The 2024–25 Turkish Women's Football Super League (Turkish: Turkcell Kadın Futbol Süper Ligi 2024–2025 Sezonu) is the 29th season of Turkey's top women's football league.

A total of 14 teams, 12 from the 2023–24 Women's Super League season and two from the 2023–24 Turkish Women's Football First League season, compete in a round-robin format. The season began on 8 September 2024 and ended on 4 May 2025, with a season's break between 22 December 2024 and 26 January 2025. The fixtures were announced on 27 August 2024.

Fatih Karagümrük folded just before the start of the season, and their place in the league was transferred to Çekmeköy BilgiDoğa Spor.

he 2024–25 Turkish Women's Football Super League season ended after 26 rounds on 4 May 2025. Ankara BB Fomget became champion the second time, and is entitled to represent Turkey at the 2025–26 UEFA Women's Champions League. Fenerbahçe finished the league season as runners-up and Beşiktaş placed third.

The last placed team Kdz. Ereğli Bld. is relegated to the Turkish Women's Football First League for the next season. They had paid the league participation fee before the beginning of the league, but had withdrown from the league without playing any match because there was no longer any possibility of sustainability due to lack of sponsorship support.

The Montenegrin Armisa Kuč of Ankara BB Fomget was awarded the second time "Top goalscorer" title with 30 goals. The Haitian Roselord Borgella of Fenerbahçe took the second place with 17 goals scored.

== Teams ==
Location of teams in Turkey in the 2024–25 season of Turkish Women's Football Super League
Location of teams in Istanbul in the 2024–25 season of Turkish Women's Football Super League

Season 2024–25
Team	Hometown	Ground	Capacity	2023–24 finish
ALG	Gaziantep	Batur Stadium		6th
Amed	Diyarbakır	Talaytepe Sports Facility		10th
Beşiktaş	Istanbul	İBB GOP Halit Kıvanç City Stadium	5,000	4th
Beylerbeyi	Istanbul	Beylerbeyi 75. Yıl Stadium	5,000	5th
Bornova Hitab	İzmir	Bornova District Stadium		Runners-up (First League)
Çekmeköy BilgiDoğa	Istanbul	Ömerli District Stadium		
Fatih Vatan	Istanbul	Bahçelievler İÖİ Stadium		12th
Fenerbahçe	Istanbul	Fenerbahçe Lefter Küçükandonyadis Stadium	200	3rd
Ankara Fomget	Ankara	Batıkent Stadium		Runners-up
Galatasaray	Istanbul	Florya Metin Oktay Facilities		Champion
Hakkarigücü	Hakkari	Merzan City Football Field		8th
Kdz. Ereğli	Karadeniz Ereğli	Beyçayir Football Field		9th
Trabzonspor	Trabzon	Mehmet Ali Yılmaz Stadium	3,000	11th
Ünye Gücü	Ordu	Ünye District Stadium		Champion (First League)

== League table ==
Pos	Team	Pld	W	D	L	GF	GA	GD	Pts	Qualification or relegation
1	ABB Fomget	26	23	1	2	100	19	+81	70	Qual. for the 2025–26 UEFA WCL 1st rd
2	Fenerbahçe	26	22	2	2	85	11	+74	68	
3	Beşiktaş	26	17	2	7	48	27	+21	53	
4	Galatasaray	26	15	5	6	73	33	+40	50	
5	Trabzonspor	26	15	3	8	64	23	+41	48	
6	Beylerbeyi	26	14	5	7	57	23	+34	47	
7	ALG	26	13	6	7	51	35	+16	45	
8	Fatih Vatan	26	11	3	12	44	30	+14	36	
9	Hakkarigücü	26	8	8	10	35	32	+3	32	
10	Ünye Kadın	26	6	5	15	47	58	−11	23	
11	Amed	26	6	5	15	32	53	−21	23	
12	Bornova Hitab (Note: 3 points deducted by the decision of the Federation)	26	5	5	16	32	66	−34	17	
13	Çekmeköy BilgiDoğa (Note: 3 points deducted by the decision of the Federation)	26	2	0	24	12	192	−180	3	
14	Kdz. Ereğli Bld. (Note: 3 points deducted by the decision of the Federation)	26	0	0	26	0	78	−78	−3	Relegation to the First League

Source: TFF.org

== Top goalscorers ==
Rank	Player	Team	Goals
1	(Montenegro) Armisa Kuč (^{1})	ABB Fomget	30
2	(Haiti) Roselord Borgella	Fenerbahçe	17
2	(United States) Abi Kim	ABB Fomget	17
4	(Angola) Patricia Seteco	ALG	15
4	(Turkey) Yağmur Uraz (^{1})	Fenerbahçe	15
4	(Turkey) Kader Hançar (^{1})	Beylerbeyi	15
7	(Cameroon) Marie Ngah	Galatasaray	14
8	(Turkey) Neslihan Demirdögen	Amed	12
8	(Turkey) Ebru Topçu	Galatasaray	12
10	(Nigeria) Taiwo Lawal	Ünye Kadın	10
10	(South Africa) Elena Gracinda Santos	Beylerbeyi	10
10	(Ukraine) Olha Ovdiychuk	ABB Fomget	10
10	(Ghana) Elizabeth Owusuaa	Hakkarigücü	10

*(1): Former top goalscorer

== Hat-tricks and more ==
Player	Sco.	For	Against	Res.	Date	Ref.
(Turkey) Ebru Topçu	3	Galatasaray	Çekmeköy BilgiDoğa	11–0	11 September 2024	
(Haiti) Roselord Borgella	3	Fenerbahçe	Çekmeköy BilgiDoğa	13–0	14 September 2024	
(Poland) Dżesika Jaszek	3	Fenerbahçe	Çekmeköy BilgiDoğa	13–0	14 September 2024	
(Czech Republic) Andrea Stašková	3	Galatasaray	Amed	4–1	3 November 2024	
(Turkey) Kader Hançar	4	Beylerbeyi	Çekmeköy BilgiDoğa	11–0	3 November 2024	
(Angola) Patricia Seteco	3	ALG	Çekmeköy BilgiDoğa	6–1	10 November 2024	
(Montenegro) Armisa Kuč	5	ABB Fomget	Çekmeköy BilgiDoğa	9–1	17 November 2024	
(Angola) Patricia Seteco	4	ALG	Bornova Hitab	4–0	8 December 2024	
(Montenegro) Armisa Kuč	3	ABB Fomget	Bornova Hitab	7-2	15 December 2024	
(Cameroon) Marie Ngah	3	Galarasaray	Çekmeköy BilgiDoğa	9-0	26 January 2025	
(Haiti) Roselord Borgella	5	Fenerbahçe	Çekmeköy BilgiDoğa	11–0	2 February 2025	
(Cameroon) Marie Ngah	4	Galarasaray	Ünye Kadın	8-1	2 February 2025	
(Montenegro) Armisa Kuč	3	ABB Fomget	Amed	4–0	2 February 2025	
(Turkey) Yağmur Uraz	4	Fenerbahçe	Bornova Hitab	5–0	2 March 2025	
(Turkey) Neslihan Demirdögen	3	ALG	Çekmeköy BilgiDoğa	7–1	22 March 2025	
(New Zealand) Maggie Jenkins	3	ALG	Çekmeköy BilgiDoğa	7–1	22 March 2025	
(Montenegro) Armisa Kuč	8	ABB Fomget	Çekmeköy BilgiDoğa	19–0	27 March 2025	
(Turkey) Kader Hançar	4	Beylerbeyi	Bornova Hitab	5–0	13 April 2025	
(Nigeria) Taiwo Lawal	5	Ünye Kadın	Çekmeköy BilgiDoğa	15–0	20 April 2025	
(Nigeria) Joy Bokiri	3	Ünye Kadın	Çekmeköy BilgiDoğa	15–0	20 April 2025	
(North Macedonia) Ulza Maksuti	3	Ünye Kadın	Çekmeköy BilgiDoğa	15–0	20 April 2025	
(United States) Abi Kim	4	ABB Fomget	Bornova Hitab	12–1	27 April 2025	
(Nigeria) Suliat Abideen	3	ABB Fomget	Bornova Hitab	12–1	27 April 2025	
(Turkey) Azra Ardos	3	Trabzonspor	Çekmeköy BilgiDoğa	17-0	27 April 2025	
(Tanzania) Dian Msewa	3	Trabzonspor	Çekmeköy BilgiDoğa	17-0	27 April 2025	
