= Fomget Gençlik ve Spor =

Turkish women's football club

Ankara BB Fomget GS
- Full name: Ankara Büyükşehir Belediyesi Fomget Gençlik ve Spor Kulübü
- Short name: ABB Fomget
- Founded: 2009; 17 years ago
- Ground: Batıkent Stadium, Yenimahalle, Ankara
- Coordinates: 39°58′02″N 32°44′00″E
- Chairman: Taner Bozkuş
- Manager: (Turkey) Fahri Bayraktar
- League: Turkish Women's Football Super League
- 2024–25: Champions
Home colours	Away colours

Ankara Büyükşehir Belediyesi Fomget Gençlik ve Spor Kulübü, formerly Fomget Gençlik ve Spor, is a Turkish women's football sports club, based in the Mamak district of Ankara and sponsored by the Ankara Metropolitan Municipality. FOMGET is short for Folklor Müzik ve Gençlik Topluluğu (Folk Dance, Music and Youth Society), a youth and sports club best known for its folk dance group. Currently, they play in the Turkcell Women's Football Super League. Club president is Taner Bozkuş.

== History ==
Fomget GS began playing in the Women's Regional Football League. They finished the 2009–10 season in the second position after the play-offs, and were promoted to the Turkish Women's Second Football League. In the 2011–12 season, they were admitted to the Women's First League. After two seasons, the team was relegated to the Second League. Since the 2013–14 season Fomget GS have played in the Second League. The team finished the 2018–19 Women's Second League season as champion, and was promoted to the Women's First League.

After the establishment of the Turkcell Women's Football Super League in 2021, the Metropolitan Municipality of Ankara decided to sponsor the club. Thus, the club's name changed to Ankara Büyükşehir Belediyesi Fomget Gençlik ve Spor.

The team became champion of the 2022–23 Super League season after play-offs and defeating Fenerbahçe in the final. ABB Fomget played in the Tournament 7 semi-finals at the 2023–24 UEFA Women's Champions League qualifying rounds against Valur from Iceland and lost 1–2. In the Third-place match, they defeated Hajvalia from Kosova by 6–0.

The team finished the 2023-24 Super League season as runner-up behind Galatasaray S.K. Team member Armisa Kuč shared the Top Goalscorer title with Yağmur Uraz of Fenerbahçe S.K. with 25 goals.

The team repeated their champions title a second time in the 2024-25 Super League season before Fenerbahçe again. Armisa Kuč became again top goalscorer with 30 goals scored.

== Stadium ==
Fomget GS play their home matches at Batıkent Stadium in Yenimahalle district of Ankara. The stadium's ground is covered by artificial turf.

== Statistics ==
As of 15 October 2025

Season	League	Rank	Pld	W	D	L	GF	GA	GD	Pts
2009–10	Regional League-Div. 3	2	11	6	2	3	27	13	+14	20
2010–11	Second League	7	18	7	1	10	33	37	−4	22
2011–12	First League	10	20	5	3	12	13	42	−29	18
2012–13	First League	9	18	3	3	12	13	51	−38	12
2013–14	Second League-Div. 2	2	16	14	0	2	109	15	+94	42
2014–15	Second League	4	22	13	3	6	58	31	+27	42
2015–16	Second League	9	22	8	53	9	41	40	+1	29
2016–17	Third League-Div. 4	1	28	26	1	1	274	7	+267	79
2017–18	Second League-Div. B	3	20	15	2	3	62	12	+50	47
2018–19	Second League	1	28	23	2	3	106	19	+87	71
2019–20	First League	12	16	1	3	12	16	53	−37	6
2020–21	Women's League Gr. C	2	3	2	0	1	9	4	+5	6
2020–21	Play-offs		3	1	0	2	2	5	-3	3
2021-22	Super League Gr. A	5	22	15	2	5	76	16	+60	47
2022-23	Super League Gr. B	2	18	16	1	1	65	11	+54	49
2022-23	Play-offs	1	7	4	1	2	17	6	+11	13
2023–24	Super League	2	30	22	3	5	78	21	+57	69
2024–25	Super League	1	26	23	1	2	100	19	+81	70
2025–26	Super League	3	5 (^{1})	4	0	1	15	3	+12	12
Green marks a season followed by promotion, red a season followed by relegation.

- (^{1}): Season in progress

== Current squad ==
As of 15 October 2025.

- Head coach: (Turkey) Hasan Vural

Note: Flags indicate national team as defined under FIFA eligibility rules; some limited exceptions apply. Players may hold more than one non-FIFA nationality.

No.	Pos.	Nation	Player
1	GK	TUR	Selda Akgöz (C)
29	GK	ESP	Mariasun Quiñones
22	DF	TUR	Medine Erkan
25	DF	UKR	Lyubov Shmatko
28	DF	TUR	Gülbin Hız
55	DF	USA	Heidi Ruth
93	DF	BRA	Rafaela Sudre
99	DF	UKR	Yana Derkach
5	MF	KOS	Blerta Smaili
6	MF	TUR	Ebru Şahini
7	MF	TUR	Başak İçinözbebek

No.	Pos.	Nation	Player
16	MF	MEX	Nayeli Rangel
20	MF	SRB	Milica Mijatović
23	MF	TUR	Seda Nur İncik
24	MF	SVN	Mateja Zver
26	MF	NGA	Suliat Abideen
38	MF	TUR	Arzu Karabulut
77	MF	UKR	Olha Ovdiychuk
88	MF	TUR	Emine Ecem Esenk
—	MF	TUR	Miray Cin
9	FW	MNE	Armisa Kuč
11	FW	BRA	Maria Alves
18	FW	POR	Ana Dias

== Notable former players ==
- (Azerbaijan) Ayshan Ahmadova
- (Azerbaijan) Aysun Aliyeva
- (Azerbaijan) Vusala Hajiyeva
- (Bosnia and Herzegovina) Ena Šabanagić
- (Botswana) Keitumetse Dithebe
- (Brazil) Maria Alves
- (Cyprus) Antri Violari
- (Finland) Sini Laaksonen
- (Georgia (country)) Ana Cheminava
- (Ghana) Abi Kim
- (Israel) Marian Awad
- (Jordan) Enas Al-Jamaeen
- (Jordan) Maysa Jbarah
- (Montenegro) Slađana Bulatović
- (Northern Cyprus) Zehra Borazancı
- (Portugal) Ana Dias
- (Puerto Rico) Danielle Marcano
- (South Africa) Chuene Morifi
- (Turkey) Sejde Abrahamsson
- (Turkey) Benan Altıntaş
- (Turkey) Remziye Bakır
- (Turkey) Emine Gümüş
- (Turkey) Tuğba Karataş
- (Turkey) Beyza Kocatürk
- (Turkey) Ümran Özev
- (Turkey) Melike Öztürk
- (Turkey) Birgül Sadıkoğlu
- (Turkey) Fatoş Yıldırım
- (Ukraine) Daryna Apanashchenko
- (Ukraine) Yuliya Shevchuk
- (United States) Shea Moyer
- (Venezuela) Oriana Altuve

== International results ==
UEFA Women's Champions League
Event	Stage	Date	Venue	Opponent	Result	Scorers	Ref.
2023–24	Semi-finals	Sep 6, 2023	Albania Shkodër	(Iceland) Valur	L 1–2	Sadıkoğlu	
2023–24	Third place play-offs	Sep 9, 2023	Albania Shkodër	(Kosovo) Hajvalia	W 6–0	Violari, Bulatović, Šabanagić, Sadıkoğlu, Marcano (2)	
2025–26	First QR Semi-finals	Jul 30, 2025	Albania Tirana	(Azerbaijan) Neftçi Baku	W 2–0	Rangel, Kuč	
2025–26	First QR Final	Aug 2, 2025	Albania Tirana	(Israel) Kiryat Gat	W 3-1	Kuč (2), Ovdiychuk	
2025–26	Second QR Semi-finals	Aug 27, 2025	Finland Helsinki	(Czech Republic) Slavia Prague	L 1–2	Kuč	
2025–26	Second QR Third Place play-offs	Aug 30, 2025	Finland Helsinki	(Finland) HJK Helsinki	W 3-2	Alves, Dias, Kuč	

=== Ranking history ===
Season	Rank	Points	Ref.
2023–24	110 ▲	3.000	
2024–25	106 ▲	1.500	

== Kit history ==
2019–20 away	2021–22 home	2022–23 home	2022–23 away	2022–23 alt	2024–25 away

== Squads ==
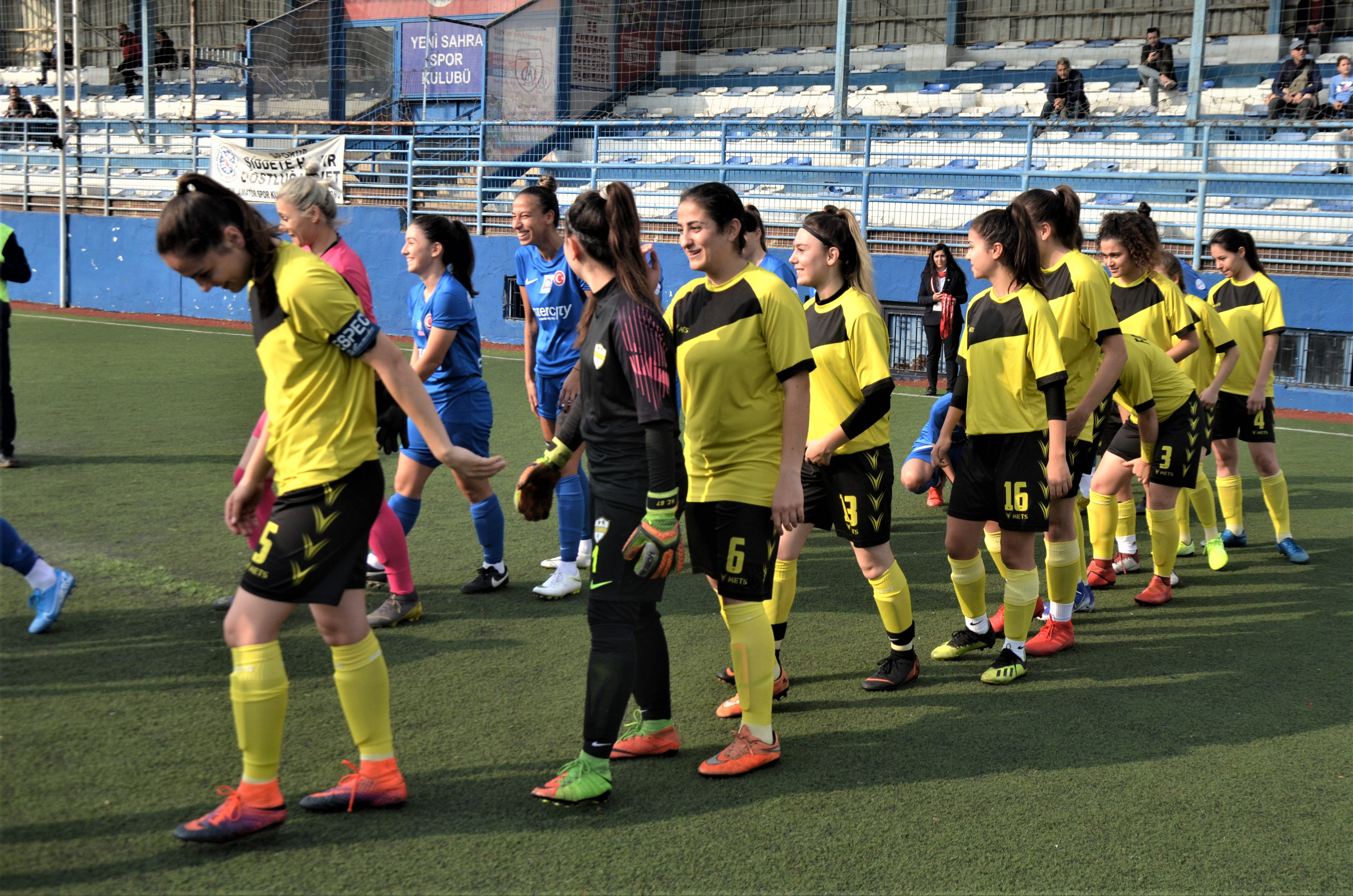
Fomget Gençlik ve Spor squad in the 2019-20 Women's First League season
