= Oleszkiewicz =

Oleszkiewicz is a Polish patronymic surname of East Slavic (Ruthenian) origin. East Slavic equivalents: Aleshkevich, Oleshkevich. Notable people with the surname include:

- Darek Oleszkiewicz (born 1963), Polish-American jazz double-bassist
- Józef Oleszkiewicz (c.1777–1830), Polish painter
- Natalia Oleszkiewicz (born 2002), Polish footballer
