= Elizabeth Owusuaa =

Ghanaian footballer (born 2001)

Personal information
- Date of birth: 3 August 2001 (age 25)
- Place of birth: Ghana
- Height: 1.85 m (6 ft 1 in)
- Position: Forward

Team information
- Current team: Hakkarigücü
- Number: 14

Senior career*
Years	Team	Apps	(Gls)
2018–2021	Sea Lions		
2021–2024	Ampem Darkoa Ladies		
2022–2024	ASA Tel Aviv University		
2024–	Hakkarigücü	38	(21)

International career
2017–	Ghana		
- * Club domestic league appearances and goals as of 3 April 2026

Elizabeth Owusuaa (born 3 August 2001) is a Ghanaian professional women's football forward who plays in the Turkish Super League for Hakkarigücü, and the Ghana women's national team.

== Club career ==
Owusuaa plays in the forward position.

She was a member of Elmina-based Sea Lions from 2018 on. In 2019, she played at the Special Women's League (Ghana FA Normalization Committee's Women's Special Competition, NCWSC), and appeared in the semifinals. She played in the Southern Zone of the Ghana Women's Premier League for the team, before she transferred to Ampem Darkoa Ladies after 2021. Her team finished the league season as champion, and she played in the Group B matches at the 2022 CAF Women's Champions League qualification - WAFU Zone B.

Went to Israel, she played in the 2022–23 and the following season at the Ligat Al Nashim for ASA Tel Aviv University.

In September 2024, she moved to Turkey, and signed a deal with the Super League club Hakkarigücü. She continued to play in the 2025–26 Super League season. In the home match of the 2025–26 Super League season's round 23, she scored five goals against 1207 Antalya that ended 7–1.

== International career ==
Owusuaa was included in the Ghanaian senior women's national team, nicknamed the "Black Queens", already in August 2017 for the preparations of the 2020 Tokyo Olympics qualification. She scored the winning goal at the national team's friendly match against Fire Ladies team. She was selected to the national team in October 2018 for the 2018 Women's Africa Cup of Nations. During the Olympics qualification in 2019, she scored one goal against Gabon. She appeared also in the third round matches against Kenya. In 2021, she was part of the national team at the first edition of the Aisha Buhari Cup in Lagos, Nigeria, where she scored a goal in the match against Cameroon.

== Personal life ==
Elizabeth Owusuaa was born on 3 August 2001.
