= Armisa Kuč =

Montenegrin footballer (born 1992)

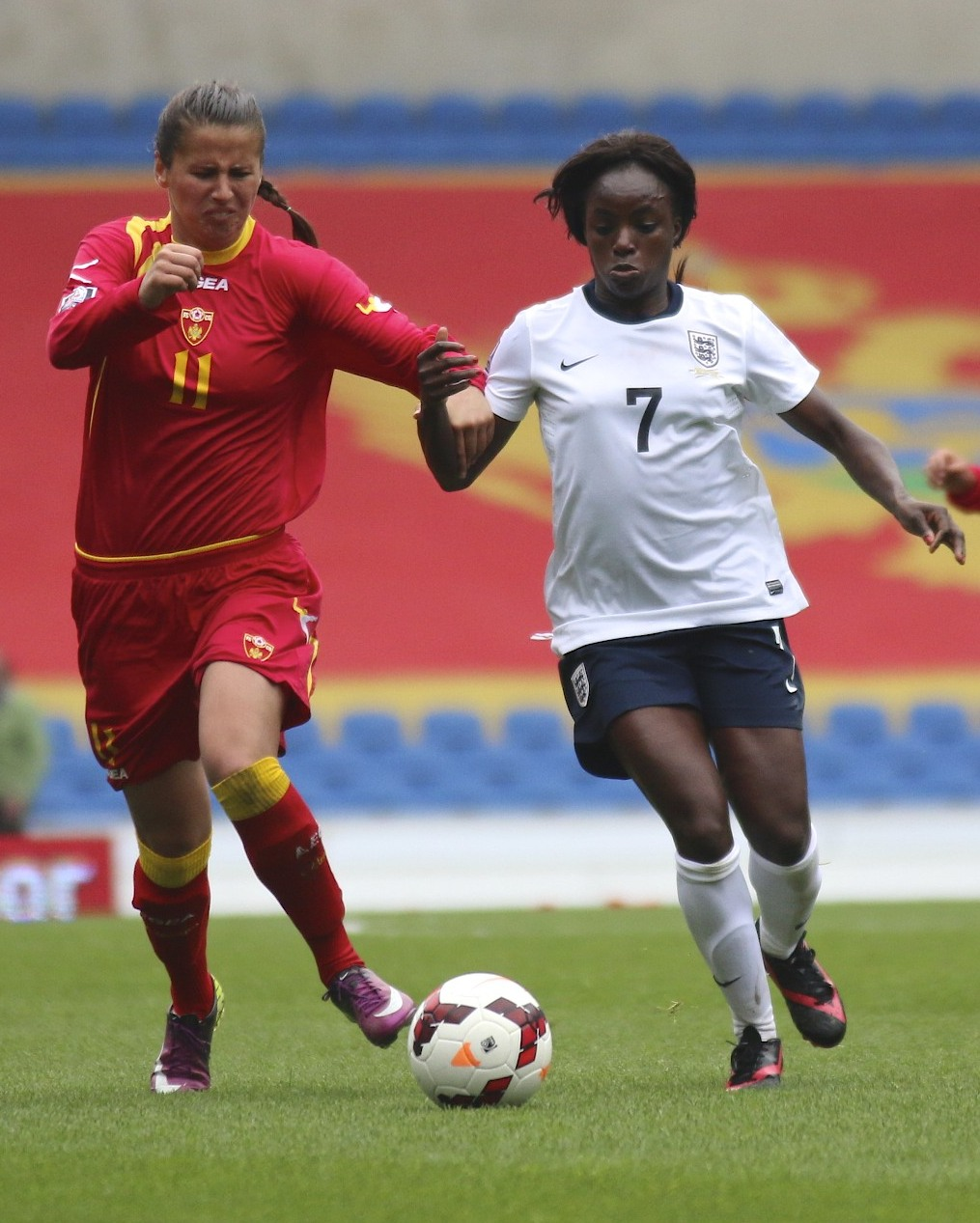
- Kuč (left) playing for Montenegro in 2014

Personal information
- Date of birth: 11 April 1992 (age 34)
- Place of birth: Nikšić, SFR Yugoslavia
- Height: 1.78 m (5 ft 10 in)
- Position: Forward

Team information
- Current team: Ankara BB Fomget
- Number: 9

Youth career
- –2012: Ekonomist

Senior career*
Years	Team	Apps	(Gls)
2012–2013	Ekonomist		
2014–2016	SFK 2000		
2017	Kvarnsveden	21	(2)
2018	Zaragoza	14	(2)
2018–2019	Málaga	23	(1)
2019–2021	SFK 2000	41	(38)
2021	Minsk	9	(14)
2022	Zenit	0	(0)
2023–	Ankara BB Fomget	82	(80)

International career^{‡}
2012–	Montenegro	101	(46)
- * Club domestic league appearances and goals ‡ National team caps and goals as of 13 October 2026

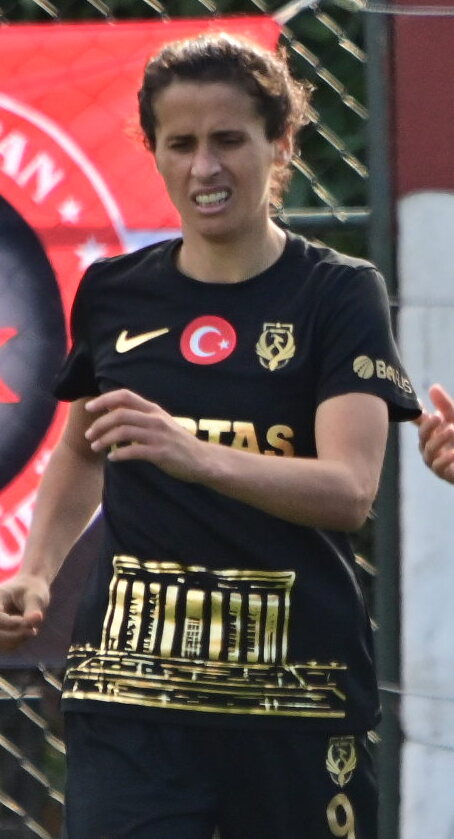
Kuč with Ankara BB Fomget

Armisa Kuč (Albanian: Armisa Kuçi; born 11 April 1992) is a Montenegrin women's football forward who plays for Ankara BB Fomget in the Turkish Super League and represents the Montenegro women's national team.

== Club career ==
Kuč played in her country's Women's League for ŽFK Ekonomist. She later joined the Bosnian-Herzegovinian club SFK 2000 in the Premier League. In 2017, she moved to Sweden and played for the Borlänge-based club Kvarnsveden, competing in the Elitettan. The next year, she moved to Spain to join Zaragoza, and then Málaga. Kuč transferred to FC Minsk in Belarus.

In January 2023, she moved to Turkey and signed with Ankara BB Fomget for the second half of the 2022–23 Super League season. She won the champions title in the 2022–23 season, became runners-up the next season, and again won the champions title in the 2024–25 season. In the 2023–24, and 2024–25 seasons, she became top goalscorer of the Super League.

== International career ==
Her debut for the Montenegro women's national team came on March 13, 2012 in a 2–3 friendly match loss against Bosnia and Herzegovina in Bar, Montenegro. She was present in all 56 games played by the Montenegro national team from its inception until September 2021, scoring a total of 20 goals.

== Career statistics ==
Club	Season	League			Cup		Continental		Total	
Club	Season	Division	Apps	Goals	Apps	Goals	Apps	Goals	Apps	Goals
Ekonomist	2012-13	Montenegrin Women's League					3	0	3	0
Ekonomist	2013-14	Montenegrin Women's League					3	1	3	1
Ekonomist	Total						6	1	6	1
SFK 2000	2014-15	Bosnian Women's League					3	1	3	1
SFK 2000	2015-16	Bosnian Women's League					3	1	3	1
SFK 2000	2016-17	Bosnian Women's League					5	3	5	3
SFK 2000	2019-20	Bosnian Women's League	11	10			3	1	14	11
SFK 2000	2020-21	Bosnian Women's League	20	20			2	1	22	21
SFK 2000	2021-22	Bosnian Women's League	10	8					10	8
SFK 2000	Total		41	38			16	7	57	45
Kvarnsvedens	2017	Damallsvenskan	21	2					21	2
Zaragoza	2017-18	Liga F	14	2					14	2
Malaga	2018-19	Liga F	23	1	1	1			24	2
Minsk	2021	Belarus Women's League	9	14	1	0	2	3	12	17
Ankara BB Fomget	2022–23	Super League	15	13	–	–			15	13
Ankara BB Fomget	2023–24	Super League	30	25	–	–	1	0	30	25
Ankara BB Fomget	2024–25	Super League	20	30	–	–			20	30
Ankara BB Fomget	2025–26	Super League	18	14			6	8	24	22
Ankara BB Fomget	2026–27	Super League	9	17			0	0	9	17
Ankara BB Fomget	Total		92	99			7	8	99	107
Career total			200	156	2	1	31	19	233	176

== International goals ==
No.	Date	Venue	Opponent	Score	Result	Competition
1.	4 April 2013	LFF Stadium, Vilnius, Lithuania	Faroe Islands	2–2	3–3	2015 FIFA Women's World Cup qualification
2.	28 April 2015	Skopje, North Macedonia	Macedonia	2–0	7–0	Friendly
3.	28 April 2015	Skopje, North Macedonia	Macedonia	4–0	7–0	Friendly
4.	29 April 2015	Skopje, North Macedonia	Macedonia	1–0	7–1	Friendly
5.	29 April 2015	Skopje, North Macedonia	Macedonia	2–0	7–1	Friendly
6.	29 April 2015	Skopje, North Macedonia	Macedonia	3–1	7–1	Friendly
7.	29 April 2015	Skopje, North Macedonia	Macedonia	6–1	7–1	Friendly
8.	29 April 2015	Skopje, North Macedonia	Macedonia	7–1	7–1	Friendly
9.	25 June 2015	Stadion Mitar Mićo Goliš, Petrovac, Montenegro	Albania	1–0	1–0	Friendly
10.	26 November 2015	Estádio António Coimbra da Mota, Estoril, Portugal	Portugal	1–1	1–6	UEFA Women's Euro 2017 qualifying
11.	27 February 2017	Elbasan, Albania	Albania	?–?	3–5	Friendly
12.	8 April 2017	Tórsvøllur, Torshavn, Faroe Islands	Faroe Islands	1–0	1–2	2019 FIFA Women's World Cup preliminary round
13.	11 April 2017	Gundadalur, Tórshavn, Faroe Islands	Luxembourg	6–0	7–1	2019 FIFA Women's World Cup preliminary round
14.	11 April 2017	Gundadalur, Tórshavn, Faroe Islands	Luxembourg	7–0	7–1	2019 FIFA Women's World Cup preliminary round
15.	26 November 2017	Adem Jashari Olympic Stadium, Mitrovica, Kosovo	Kosovo	1–0	2–3	Friendly
16.	22 January 2020	Camp FSCG, Podgorica, Montenegro	Bosnia and Herzegovina	1–0	2–3	Friendly
17.	21 February 2021	Camp FSCG, Podgorica, Montenegro	North Macedonia	1–0	5–0	Friendly
18.	21 February 2021	Camp FSCG, Podgorica, Montenegro	North Macedonia	5–0	5–0	Friendly
19.	10 June 2021	Centenary Stadium, Ta'Qali, Malta	Malta	2–0	2–1	Friendly
20.	17 September 2021	FF BH Football Training Centre, Zenica, Bosnia & Herzegovina	Bosnia and Herzegovina	1–0	3–2	2023 FIFA Women's World Cup qualification
21.	17 September 2021	FF BH Football Training Centre, Zenica, Bosnia & Herzegovina	Bosnia and Herzegovina	2–0	3–2	2023 FIFA Women's World Cup qualification
22.	26 October 2021	Podgorica City Stadium, Podgorica, Montenegro	Denmark	1–3	1–5	2023 FIFA Women's World Cup qualification
23.	26 November 2021	Centenary Stadium, Ta'Qali, Malta	Malta	1–0	2–0	2023 FIFA Women's World Cup qualification
24.	15 February 2023	Camp FSCG, Podgorica, Montenegro	Moldova	1–0	6–1	Friendly
25.	15 February 2023	Camp FSCG, Podgorica, Montenegro	Moldova	3–1	6–1	Friendly
26.	17 July 2023	Stadionul CPSM, Vadul lui Vodă, Moldova	Moldova	2–0	5–0	Friendly
27.	22 September 2023	Tórsvøllur, Tórshavn, Faroe Islands	Faroe Islands	1–0	1–0	2023–24 UEFA Women's Nations League
28.	27 October 2023	Dasaki Stadium, Dasaki Achnas, Cyprus	Cyprus	1–0	2–0	2023–24 UEFA Women's Nations League
29.	1 December 2023	Podgorica City Stadium, Podgorica, Montenegro	Faroe Islands	2–0	9–0	2023–24 UEFA Women's Nations League
30.	1 December 2023	Podgorica City Stadium, Podgorica, Montenegro	Faroe Islands	3–0	9–0	2023–24 UEFA Women's Nations League
31.	5 December 2023	DG Arena, Podgorica, Montenegro	Cyprus	2–0	2–0	2023–24 UEFA Women's Nations League
32.	9 April 2024	Podgorica City Stadium, Podgorica, Montenegro	Faroe Islands	2–1	5–1	UEFA Women's Euro 2025 qualifying
33.	9 April 2024	Podgorica City Stadium, Podgorica, Montenegro	Faroe Islands	3–1	5–1	UEFA Women's Euro 2025 qualifying
34.	31 May 2024	Theodoros Vardinogiannis Stadium, Heraklion, Greece	Greece	1–0	2–2	UEFA Women's Euro 2025 qualifying
35.	4 June 2024	Estadi Nacional, Andorra la Vella, Andorra	Andorra	1–0	5–1	UEFA Women's Euro 2025 qualifying
36.	4 June 2024	Estadi Nacional, Andorra la Vella, Andorra	Andorra	2–0	5–1	UEFA Women's Euro 2025 qualifying
37.	12 July 2024	Tórsvøllur, Tórshavn, Faroe Islands	Faroe Islands	1–1	1–2	UEFA Women's Euro 2025 qualifying
38.	3 December 2024	Petar Miloševski Training Centre, Skopje, North Macedonia	North Macedonia	2–1	5–1	Friendly
39.	25 February 2025	Gradski Stadion, Nikšić, Montenegro	Lithuania	1–0	3–1	2025 UEFA Women's Nations League
40.	25 February 2025	Gradski Stadion, Nikšić, Montenegro	Lithuania	2–1	3–1	2025 UEFA Women's Nations League
41.	25 February 2025	Gradski Stadion, Nikšić, Montenegro	Lithuania	3–1	3–1	2025 UEFA Women's Nations League
42.	24 October 2025	Stadion ŠRC Marijan Šuto Mrma, Zmijavci, Croatia	Croatia	1–0	3–1	Friendly
43.	3 March 2026	Gradski Stadion, Nikšić, Montenegro	Albania	1–0	1–2	2027 FIFA Women's World Cup qualification
44.	7 March 2026	Parc y Scarlets, Llanelli, Wales	Wales	1–5	1–6	2027 FIFA Women's World Cup qualification
45.	9 October 2026	DG Arena, Podgorica, Montenegro	Bosnia and Herzegovina	3–2	3–2	Friendly
46.	13 October 2026	Stade Municipal, Rumelange, Luxembourg	Luxembourg	1–0	4–0	Friendly

== Honours ==
=== Club ===
Ekonomist

- Montenegrin Women's League: 2012–13

SFK 2000

- Bosnian Women's Premier League: 2014–15, 2015–16
- Bosnian Women's Cup: 2014–15, 2015–16

Turkish Women's Football Super League

Ankara BB Fomget
Champions (2): 2022–23, 2024–25
Runners-up (1): 2023–24

=== Individual ===
Crystal Feet - Top Goalscorer: 2023-24,

Top Goalscorer (1): 2024-25.
