= Şile BilgiDoğa Sportif =

Turkish women's association football club

- Full name: Şile BilgiDoğa Sportif Yat. Hiz. A.Ş.
- Founded: 2024; 2 years ago
- Ground: Şile District Stadium
- Coordinates: 41.17427°N 29.60524°E
- Chairman: Hasan Şahinkaya
- League: Turkish Women's Super League
- 2025–26: 11th

Şile BilgiDoğa Sportif (Turkish: Şile BilgiDoğa Sportif Yatırım Hizmetleri A.Ş.), fotmerly (Turkish: Çekmeköy BilgiDoğa Sportif Yatırım Hizmetleri A.Ş. Spor Kulübü), is a Turkish women's football club based in Istanbul, Turkey, and compete in the Turkish Women's Football Super League.

== History ==
=== Çekmeköy BilgiDoğa Sportif ===
The women's football club was established as Çekmeköy BilgiDoğa Sportif Yatırım Hizmetleri A.Ş. Spor Kulübü located in Çekmeköy district of Istanbul Province. The name BilgiDoğa is a portmanteau of the education institutions Istanbul Bilgi University and Doğa Schools owned by the Can Holding.

The club was admitted to the 2024-25 Turkish Women's Football Super League after Fatih Karagümrük S.K., which were officially scheduled to play in the league season, were folded just before the first round, and transferred their league participation rights.

=== Şile BilgiDoğa Sportif ===
Moving from Çekmeköy to the northern neighbor districy Şile, the club changed its name from Çekmeköy BilgiDoğa Sportif to Şile BilgiDoğa Sportif after 27 match weeks of the 2025-26 Women's Super League season in the beginning of May 2026, just three match weeks before the end of the season.

== Stadium ==
The team play their home matches at Ömerli District Stadium in Çekmeköy, Istanbul. From the 2025-26 Women's Super League season on, the team play the home matches at Şile District Stadium.

== Statistics ==
Season	League	Rank	Pld	W	D	L	GF	GA	GD	Pts
2024–25	Super League	13	26	2	0	24	12	192	−180	3 (Note: 3 points deducted by the decision of the Federation)
2025–26	Super League	11	30	9	2	19	37	110	-73	29
2026–27	Super League	16	8 (Note: Season in progress)	1	0	7	6	71	-65	0 (Note: 3 points deducted by the decision of the Federation)
Green marks a season followed by promotion, red a season followed by relegation.

Legend

== Current squad ==
As of 28 October 2026.

- Head coach:

Note: Flags indicate national team as defined under FIFA eligibility rules; some limited exceptions apply. Players may hold more than one non-FIFA nationality.

No.	Pos.	Nation	Player
29	GK	TUR	Nisanur Kızılkaya
2	DF	TUR	Hilal Karagöz
4	DF	TUR	Ecrin Koyun
14	DF	AZE	Samira Ashirova
77	DF	TUR	İlden Şimşek
88	DF	TUR	Songül Altınöz
6	MF	TUR	Filiz Kurtuluş
8	MF	TUR	Arzu Yedikardeş

No.	Pos.	Nation	Player
10	MF	TUR	İlayda Pınar
17	MF	TUR	Nazlı Feride Aletirik
23	MF	TUR	Gamze Demirtaş
55	MF	TUR	Yaren Şurutoğlu
61	MF	TUR	Arife İspiroğlu
7	FW	CIV	Gemima Bouazo
21	FW	CIV	Grace Bleu
26	FW	NGR	Judith Okah

== Former notable players ==
Azerbaijan

- Nazlıcan Parlak

Turkey

- Çiğdem Belci
- Sevgi Çınar
- Duygu Yılmaz

== Kit history ==
2024–25 home	2024–25 away
