= Patricia Seteco =

Angolan footballer (born 1992)

Patrícia Seteco
Personal information
- Full name: Patrícia Mingas Afonso Seteco
- Date of birth: 26 September 1992 (age 34)
- Place of birth: Cabinda, Angola
- Height: 1.86 m (6 ft 1 in)
- Position: Center-forward

Team information
- Current team: Ferroviária

Senior career*
Years	Team	Apps	(Gls)
- Amigas do Mártires (Angola)
- 113 de Cabinda
- Bravos de Cabinda
- Progresso do Sambizanga
- Clínica Sagrada Esperança
- AC Léopards
- FCF Amani
- AC Colombe
- Bikira
2023-2024	ALG Spor	33	(30)
2025	WFC Nike Lusso	0	(0)
2026-	Ferroviária	0	(0)

International career
- Angola
- * Club domestic league appearances and goals as of 22 December 2024

Patrícia Mingas Afonso Seteco (born 26 September 1992) is an Angolan footballer who plays as a forward for Ferroviária.

== Club career ==
Seteco is 1.86 m (6 ft 1 in) tall. She plays in the center-forward position.

In November 2023, she moved to Turkey, and joined the Gaziantep-based club ALG Spor to play in the Women's Super League. In the 2023-24 season, she scored 15 goals in 23 matches. In May 2024, her club extended her contract for one more year.

In January 2026, Seteco joined Ferroviária.

== International career ==
Seteco was part of the Angola women's national team at the 2024 COSAFA Women's Championship.
