= Taiwo Lawal =

Nigerian footballer (born 2004)

Personal information
- Full name: Taiwo Busirat Lawal
- Date of birth: 19 February 2004 (age 22)
- Place of birth: Lagos, Nigeria
- Position: Forward

Team information
- Current team: Al Taraji
- Number: 9

Senior career*
Years	Team	Apps	(Gls)
2023–2024	Ataşehir Belediyespor	29	(14)
2024–2025	Ünye Kadın	22	(10)
2025–2026	Mazatlán	28	(7)
2026–	Al Taraji	6	(5)

International career
2020	Nigeria U17		(2)
2021–2022	Nigeria U20		(1)
- * Club domestic league appearances and goals as of 24 October 2026

Taiwo Busirat Lawal (born 19 February 2004) is a Nigerian professional footballer who plays as forward for Saudi Women's Premier League side Al Taraji.

== Club career ==
Lawal began her football career with Aseyori Queens before moving to Robo Queens. Where she established herself as a prolific goalscorer, netting six goals to win the Golden Boot at the 2022 Betsy Obaseki Women's Cup.

In September 2023, Lawal signed a two-year contract with Turkish club Ataşehir Belediyespor. Ahead of the following season, she moved to fellow Turkish Super League club Ünye Kadın.

In June 2025, Liga MX Femenil's Mazatlán announced the signing of Lawal. During the Apertura 2025, Lawal made 11 appearances, including five starts, and scored one goal. In the Clausura 2026, she scored three goals in five appearances.

In September 2026, Al Taraji of the Saudi Women's Premier League announced the signing of Lawal for the 2026–27 Saudi Women's Premier League campaign. On 15 October 2026, she scored a super hat-trick, her first goals for the club, in a 5–0 victory over Eastern Flames in the 2026–27 Saudi Women's Cup.

== International career ==
Lawal has represented Nigeria at under-17 and under-20 youth international levels, featuring in the 2020 African U-17 Women's World Cup qualification, where she scored a brace against Guinea, and the 2022 African U-20 Women's World Cup qualification, where she scored against the Central African Republic.
