= Natalia Oleszkiewicz =

Polish footballer (born 2002)

Personal information
- Date of birth: 2 March 2002 (age 24)
- Place of birth: Szczecin, Poland
- Position: Forward

Team information
- Current team: Montpellier

Youth career
- –2016: Drawa Drawsko Pomorskie
- 2016–2017: Olimpia Szczecin

Senior career*
Years	Team	Apps	(Gls)
2017–2022	Olimpia Szczecin	88	(7)
2022–2025	Pogoń Szczecin	61	(31)
2025–2026	Trabzon	22	(30)
2026–	Montpellier	0	(0)

International career^{‡}
2024–	Poland	2	(0)
- * Club domestic league appearances and goals as of 22:21, 25 May 2026 (UTC) ‡ National team caps and goals as of 17 October 2025

Natalia Oleszkiewicz (born 2 March 2002) is a Polish professional footballer who plays as a forward for French Première Ligue club Montpellier.

== Club career ==
After starting her youth career with Drawa Drawsko Pomorskie, Oleszkiewicz moved to Olimpia Szczecin in 2016. In 2022, she joined Pogoń Szczecin following their merger with Olimpia.

In the beginning of July 2025, she moved to Turkey and joined the Super League club Trabzon.

== International career ==
Oleszkiewicz is a member of Poland national team. She appeared in two matches in 2024.

== Career statistics ==
=== International ===
As of match played 4 June 2024

Appearances and goals by national team and year
National team	Year	Apps	Goals
Poland
Poland	2024	2	0
Total		2	0

== Honours ==
Pogoń Szczecin

- Ekstraliga: 2023–24

Individual

- Ekstraliga top scorer: 2023–24
- Turkish Super League top scorer: 2025–26
