= Yağmur Uraz =

Turkish footballer (born 1990)

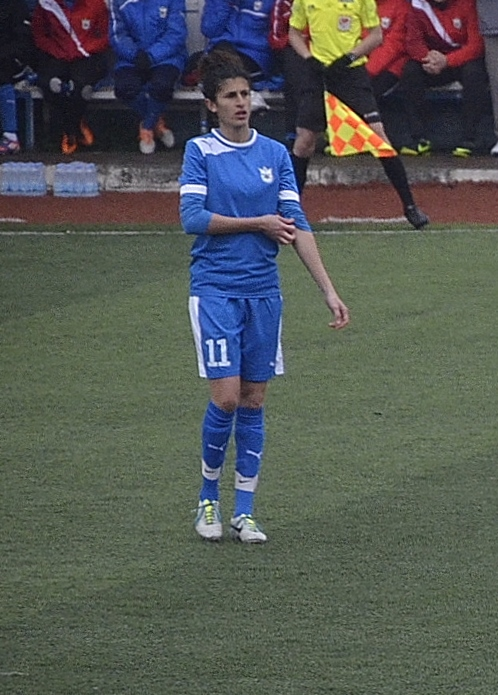
- Yağmur Uraz in 2014

Personal information
- Full name: Yağmur Uraz
- Date of birth: 19 February 1990 (age 36)
- Place of birth: Altındağ, Ankara, Turkey
- Position: Striker

Team information
- Current team: Fenerbahçe
- Number: 11

Senior career*
Years	Team	Apps	(Gls)
2008–2010	Gazi Üniversitesispor	35	(41)
2010–2013	Ataşehir Belediyespor	61	(55)
2014–2015	Konak Belediyespor	21	(13)
2015–2016	Kireçburnu Spor	17	(12)
2016–2018	Ataşehir Belediyespor	42	(32)
2019	ALG Spor	9	(4)
2019–2022	Beşiktaş	41	(47)
2022–2023	Galatasaray	17	(23)
2023–	Fenerbahçe	78	(58)

International career^{‡}
2007–2008	Turkey U-19	22	(6)
2006–2024	Turkey	66	(28)
- * Club domestic league appearances and goals as of 08:25, 8 September 2026 (UTC) ‡ National team caps and goals as of 20 July 2025

Yağmur Uraz (born 19 February 1990) is a Turkish football striker currently playing in the Super League for Fenerbahçe. She played in the Turkey women's U-19 national teams before joining the Turkish national team.

== Club career ==
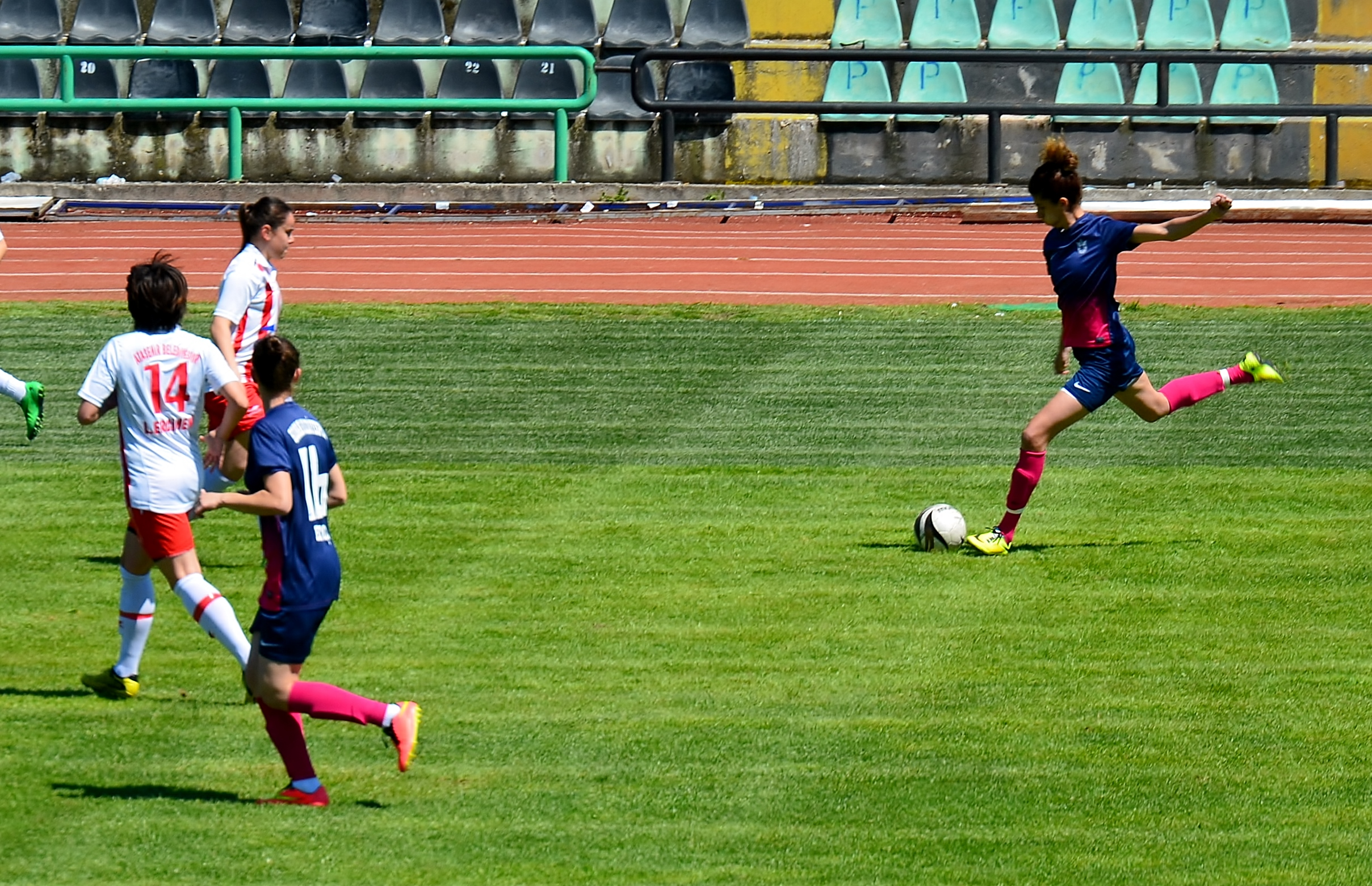
Yağmur Uraz shooting for Konak Belediyespor in the 2014–15 season.

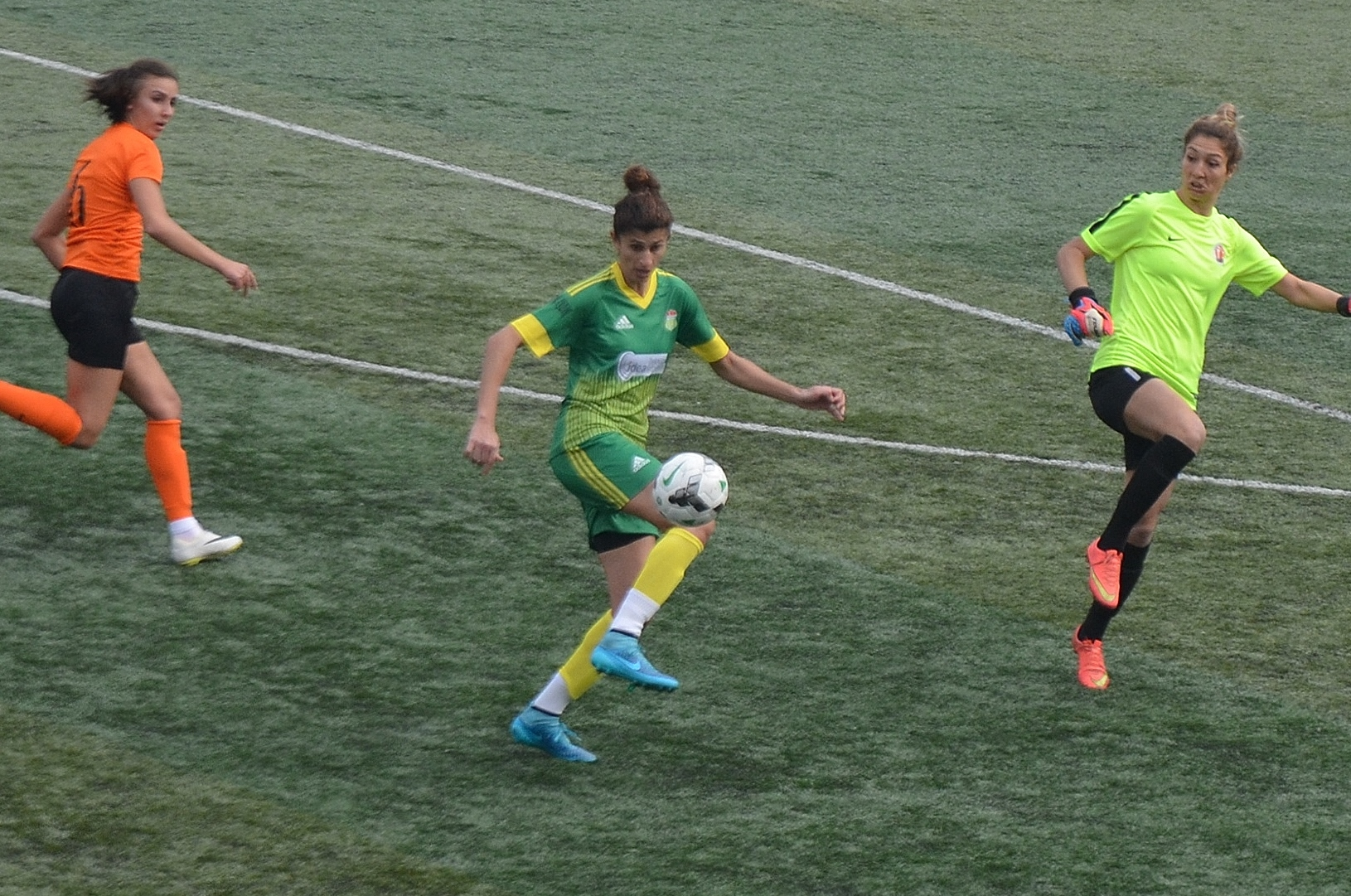
Yağmur Uraz (green/yellow) playing for Kireçburnu Spor against 1207 Antalya Muratpaşa Belediye Spor in the home match of the 2015–16 season.

Yağmur Uraz began football playing in the Ankara club Gazi Üniversitesispor by receiving her license on 4 March 2003. She played in all the age teams of the club, and became finally part of the senior team in the 2008–09 season. In the 2009–10 season, she enjoyed Women's First League championship. The next season, she transferred to Ataşehir Belediyesi, which became two successive seasons league champion.

Uraz made her Champions League debut in August 2011. She netted a goal for Ataşehir Belediyesi in the 2012–13 UEFA Women's Champions League match against the Slovenian team ŽNK Pomurje. In the UEFA Women's Euro 2013 qualifying – Group 2 round match against Switzerland, she scored the only goal for the national team.

=== Konak Belediyespor ===
On 10 January 2014, she was transferred by the İzmir-based Konak Belediyespor, which was league champion of the 2012–13 season. She will be playing the 2013–14 season's second half matches with Konak Belediyespor.

=== Kireçburnu Spor ===
For the 2015–16 season, she signed with Kireçburnu Spor, which was recently promoted to the Women's First League.

=== Ataşehir Belediyespor ===
Uraz returned to her former club Ataşehir Belediyespor for the 2016–17 season. She enjoyed her team's champion title at the end of the 2017–18 season, and played in three matches of the 2018–19 UEFA Women's Champions League scoring three goals.

=== ALG Spor ===
In the second half of the 2018–19 season, she transferred to the recently promoted Gaziantep-based club ALG Spor.

=== Beşiktaş J.K. ===
She was transferred by the 2018–19 Women's First League champion Beşiktaş J.K. to play in the 2019–20 UEFA Women's Champions League – Group 9 matches. She scored one goal of her team in the second game against the Dutch FC Twente Vrouwen.

Following her team's champions title in the 2020–21 Turkcell League season, she played in two matches of the 2021–22 UEFA Women's Champions League qualifying rounds, and scored a foal against ŽFK Kamenica Sasa from North Macedonia.

=== Galatasaray S.K. ===
On 10 August 2022, the Turkish Women's Football Super League team was transferred to the Galatasaray club. In the 2022–23 season, she scored 23 goals in 17 matches and completed the season as the top scorer.

=== Fenerbahçe S.K. ===
On 21 July 2023, Uraz joined Super League fellow archrival Fenerbahçe.

=== UEFA Women's Champions League goals ===
International goals
Date	Venue	Opponent	Competition	Result	Scored
Ataşehir Belediyespor
16 August 2012	Beltinci Sports Park, Beltinci, Slovenia	(Slovenia) Pomurje	2012–13	L 2–4	1
Konak Belediyespor
9 August 2014	Stadions Arkādija Riga, Latvia	(Latvia) Rīgas FS	2014–15	W 11–0	3
Ataşehir Belediyespor
7 August 2018	III. Kerületi TVE Stadion, Budapest, Hungary	(Czech Republic) SK Slavia Prague	2018–19	L 2–7	1
10 August 2018	Hidegkúti Nándor Stadion, Budapest, Hungary	(Hungary) MTK Hungária FC	2018–19	D 2–2	1
August 13 2018	III. Kerületi TVE Stadion, Budapest, Hungary	(Kosovo) KFF Mitrovica	2018–19	W 6–1	1
Beşiktaş J.K.
10 August 2019	Sportpark Scheurserve, Enschede, Netherlands	(Netherlands) FC Twente Vrouwen	2019–20 Group 9	D 2–2	1
21 August 2021	Juventus Training Ground, Turin, Italy	(North Macedonia) ŽFK Kamenica Sasa	2021–22 Tournament 8	W 4–0	1

== International career ==
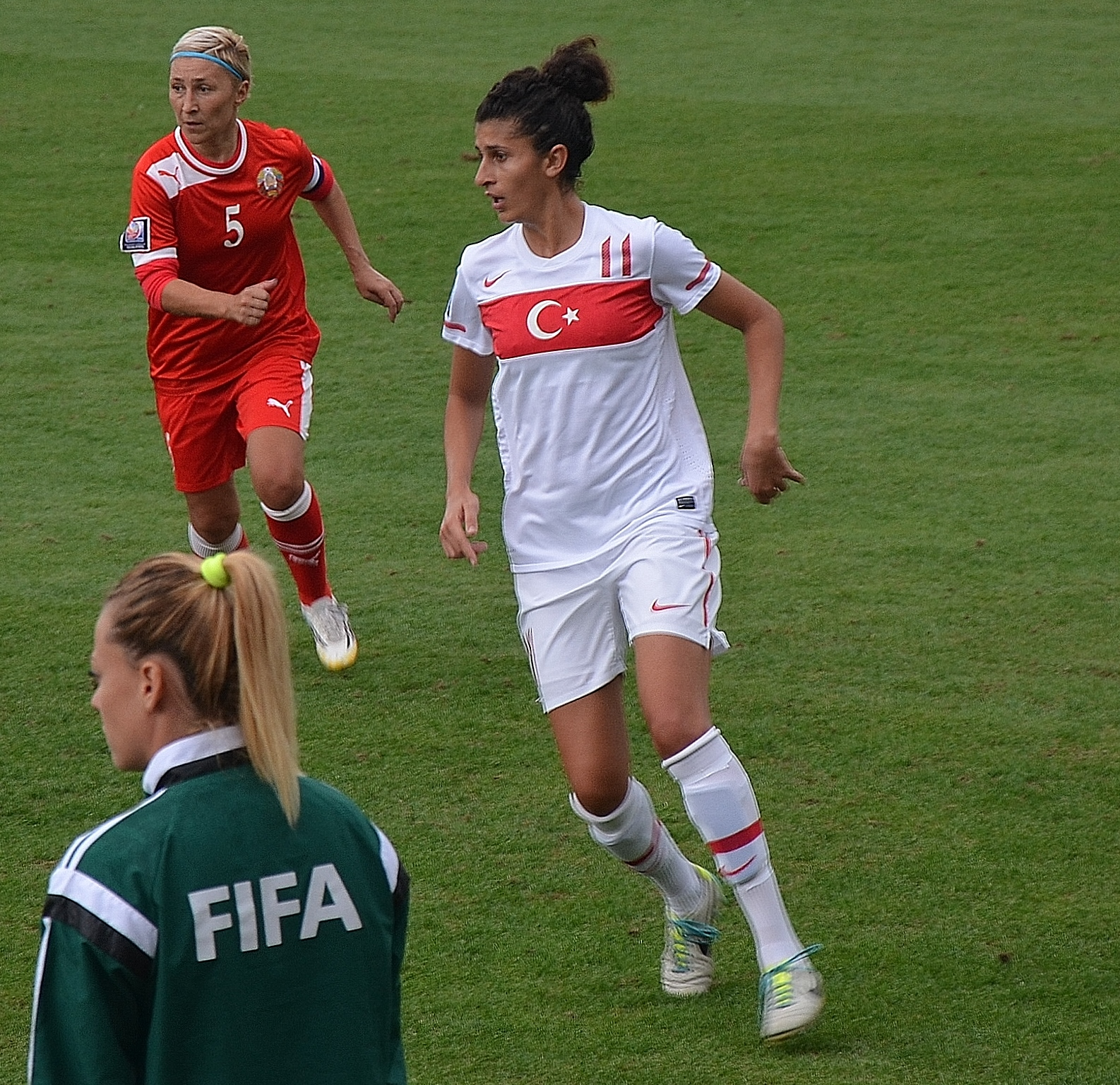
Yağmur Uraz (white kit) in the 2015 FIFA Women's World Cup qualification – UEFA Group 6 match against Belarus.

In the UEFA Women's Euro 2009 qualifying round held in Turkey, Yağmur Uraz scored two goals against the Georgian team, She shot two goals each in the matches against Malta at the 2011 FIFA Women's World Cup qualification – UEFA Group 5 in 2010.

Uraz netted the only goal for her country in the UEFA Women's Euro 2013 qualifying – Group 2 match against the Swiss women. On 28 November 2013, she scored the second goal for Turkey in the 2015 FIFA Women's World Cup qualification – UEFA Group 6 match against Montenegron team that ended with 3–1. She netted each one goal in the matches against Belarus and Montenegro, and two goals in the home match against Belarus at the same tournament.

She played at all five matches of the 2023 FIFA Women's World Cup qualification – UEFA Group H, and scored a goal against Bulgaria.

=== National team goals ===
International goals (Friendly matches not included)
Date	Venue	Opponent	Competition	Result	Scored
Turkey women's U-19 national football team
2 October 2007	KS Proszowianka Stadium Proszowice, Poland	Bulgaria	2008 UEFA Women's Championship First qualifying round	W 4–0	2
Tırlkey women's
23 November 2006	Adana 5 Ocak Stadium, Adana, Turkey	Georgia	UEFA Women's Euro 2009 qualifying	W 9–0	2
27 March 2010	Centenary Stadium, Ta' Qali, Malta	Malta	2011 FIFA Women's World Cup qualification – UEFA Group 5	W 2–0	2
11 April 2010	Hüseyin Avni Aker Stadium, Trabzon, Turkey	Malta	2011 FIFA Women's World Cup qualification – UEFA Group 5	W 5–1	2
15 September 2012	Atatürk Olympic Stadium, Istanbul, Turkey	Switzerland	UEFA Women's Euro 2013 qualifying – Group 2	L 1–3	1
28 November 2013	Buca Arena, İzmir, Turkey	Montenegro	2015 FIFA Women's World Cup qualification – UEFA Group 6	W 3–1	1
7 May 2014	Spartak Stadium, Mogilev, Belarus	Belarus	2015 FIFA Women's World Cup qualification – UEFA Group 6	W 2–1	1
19 June 2014	Stadion Pod Malim Brdom, Petrovac, Montenegro	Montenegro	2015 FIFA Women's World Cup qualification – UEFA Group 6	W 3–2	1
17 September 2014	Minareli Çavuş Stadium, Bursa, Turkey	Belarus	2015 FIFA Women's World Cup qualification – UEFA Group 6	W 3–0	2
17 September 2015	Kazım Karabekir Stadium, Erzurum, Turkey	Croatia	UEFA Women's Euro 2017 qualifying Group 5	L 1–4	1
27 November 2020	Sportland, Tallinn, Estonia	Estonia	UEFA Women's Euro 2022 qualifying Group A	W 4–0	1
14 June 2021	TFF Riva Facility, Istanbul, Turkey	Bulgaria	Friendly	W 3–1	
21 October 2021	Esenyurt Necmi Kadıoğlu Stadium, Turkey	Bulgaria	2023 FIFA Women's World Cup qualification – UEFA Group H	W 1–0	1
23 February 2022	Gürsel Aksel Stadium, İzmir, Turkey	Serbia	2023 FIFA Women's World Cup qualification – UEFA Group H	L 2–5	1
22 September 2023	Mikheil Meskhi-2 Stadium, Tbilisi, Georgie	Georgia	2023–24 UEFA Women's Nations League C	W 3–0	1
1 December 2023	LFF Stadium, Vilnius, Lithuania	Lithuania	2023–24 UEFA Women's Nations League C	W 4–0	

== International goals ==
No.	Date	Venue	Opponent	Score	Result	Competition
1.	23 November 2006	5 Ocak Stadium, Adana, Turkey	Georgia	8–0	9–0	UEFA Women's Euro 2009 qualifying
2.	23 November 2006	5 Ocak Stadium, Adana, Turkey	Georgia	9–0	9–0	UEFA Women's Euro 2009 qualifying
3.	27 March 2010	Centenary Stadium, Ta'Qali, Malta	Malta	1–0	2–0	2011 FIFA Women's World Cup qualification
4.	27 March 2010	Centenary Stadium, Ta'Qali, Malta	Malta	2–0	2–0	2011 FIFA Women's World Cup qualification
5.	11 April 2010	Hüseyin Avni Aker Stadium, Trabzon, Turkey	Malta	2–0	5–1	2011 FIFA Women's World Cup qualification
6.	11 April 2010	Hüseyin Avni Aker Stadium, Trabzon, Turkey	Malta	5–1	5–1	2011 FIFA Women's World Cup qualification
7.	15 September 2011	Atatürk Olympic Stadium, Istanbul, Turkey	Switzerland	1–1	1–3	UEFA Women's Euro 2013 qualifying
8.	28 November 2013	Buca Arena, İzmir, Turkey	Montenegro	2–1	3–1	2015 FIFA Women's World Cup qualification
9.	7 May 2014	Spartak Stadium, Mogilev, Belarus	Belarus	1–0	2–1	2015 FIFA Women's World Cup qualification
10.	19 June 2014	Stadion Pod Malim Brdom, Petrovac, Montenegro	Montenegro	2–2	3–2	2015 FIFA Women's World Cup qualification
11.	17 September 2014	Minareliçavuş Spor Tesisleri, Bursa, Turkey	Belarus	2–0	3–0	2015 FIFA Women's World Cup qualification
12.	17 September 2014	Minareliçavuş Spor Tesisleri, Bursa, Turkey	Belarus	3–0	3–0	2015 FIFA Women's World Cup qualification
13.	24 February 2015	Rize Atatürk Stadium, Rize, Turkey	Georgia	3–2	4–2	Friendly
14.	26 February 2015	Hüseyin Avni Aker Stadium, Trabzon, Turkey	Georgia	2–0	6–0	Friendly
15.	26 February 2015	Hüseyin Avni Aker Stadium, Trabzon, Turkey	Georgia	3–0	6–0	Friendly
16.	26 February 2015	Hüseyin Avni Aker Stadium, Trabzon, Turkey	Georgia	4–0	6–0	Friendly
17.	17 September 2015	Kazım Karabekir Stadium, Erzurum, Turkey	Croatia	1–0	1–4	UEFA Women's Euro 2017 qualifying
18.	27 November 2020	Sportsland, Tallinn, Estonia	Estonia	4–0	4–0	UEFA Women's Euro 2022 qualifying
19.	14 June 2021	TFF Riva Facility, Istanbul, Turkey	Bulgaria	1–0	3–1	Friendly
20.	16 September 2021	Bahçeşehir Okulları Stadium, Alanya, Turkey	Portugal	1–0	1–1	2023 FIFA Women's World Cup qualification
21.	21 September 2021	Esenyurt Necmi Kadıoğlu Stadium, Istanbul, Turkey	Bulgaria	1–0	1–0	2023 FIFA Women's World Cup qualification
22.	23 February 2022	Gürsel Aksel Stadium, İzmir, Turkey	Serbia	1–3	2–5	2023 FIFA Women's World Cup qualification
23.	12 November 2022	Emirhan Sport Complex, Manavgat, Turkey	Jordan	3–0	7–0	Friendly
24.	12 November 2022	Emirhan Sport Complex, Manavgat, Turkey	Jordan	4–0	7–0	Friendly
25.	15 November 2022	Emirhan Sport Complex, Manavgat, Turkey	Jordan	1–0	5–0	Friendly
26.	22 September 2023	Mikheil Meskhi Stadium, Tbilisi, Georgia	Georgia	3–0	3–0	2023–24 UEFA Women's Nations League
27.	1 December 2023	LFF Stadium, Vilnius, Lithuania	Lithuania	2–0	4–0	2023–24 UEFA Women's Nations League
28.	25 February 2024	Emirhan Sport Complex, Manavgat, Turkey	Greece	1–0	1–2	Friendly

== Career statistics ==
As of 10 January 2024

Club	Season	League			Continental		National		Total	
Club	Season	Division	Apps	Goals	Apps	Goals	Apps	Goals	Apps	Goals
Gazi Üniversitesispor	2003–2008	First League	0	0	–	–	23	8	23	8
Gazi Üniversitesispor	2008–09	First League	17	16	–	–	1	0	18	16
Gazi Üniversitesispor	2009–10	First League	18	25	–	–	4	4	22	29
Gazi Üniversitesispor	Total		35	41	–	–	28	12	63	53
Ataşehir Belediyesi	2010–11	First League	21	20	–	–	0	0	21	20
Ataşehir Belediyesi	2011–12	First League	16	15	3	0	4	0	23	15
Ataşehir Belediyesi	2012–13	First League	18	15	3	1	2	1	23	17
Ataşehir Belediyesi	2013–14	First League	6	5	–	–	3	0	9	5
Ataşehir Belediyesi	Total		61	55	6	1	9	1	76	57
Konak Belediyespor	2013–14	First League	10	6	–	–	5	3	15	9
Konak Belediyespor	2014–15	First League	11	7	2	3	4	6	17	16
Konak Belediyespor	Total		21	13	2	3	9	9	32	25
Kireçburnu Spor	2015–16	First League	17	12	–	–	7	1	24	13
Kireçburnu Spor	Total		17	12	–	–	7	1	24	13
Ataşehir Belediyesi	2016–17	First League	24	14	–	–	0	0	24	14
Ataşehir Belediyesi	2017–18	First League	18	18	–	–	0	0	18	18
Ataşehir Belediyesi	2018–19	First League	0	0	3	3	0	0	3	3
Ataşehir Belediyesi	Total		42	32	3	3	0	0	45	35
ALG Spor	2018–19	First League	9	4	–	–	0	0	9	4
ALG Spor	Total		9	4	–	–	0	0	9	4
Beşiktaş	2019–20	First League	15	27	3	1	1	0	19	28
Beşiktaş	2020–21	First League	6	3	–	–	6	2	12	5
Beşiktaş	2021–22	Super League	20	17	2	1	9	3	31	21
Beşiktaş	Total		41	47	5	2	16	5	62	54
Galatasaray	2022–23	Super League	17	23	–	–	6	3	23	26
Galatasaray	Total		17	23	–	–	6	3	23	26
Fenerbahçe	2023–24	Super League	30	25	–	–	9	3	39	28
Fenerbahçe	2024–25	Super League	24	15	–	–	0	0	24	15
Fenerbahçe	2025–26	Super League	20	16	–	–	0	0	20	16
Fenerbahçe	2026–27	Super League	2	2	2	0	0	0	4	2
Fenerbahçe	Total		76	58	2	0	9	3	87	61
Career total			319	285	18	9	84	34	421	328

== Honours ==
Turkish Women's First League

Gazi Üniversitesispor
Winners (3): 2006–07, 2007–08, 2009–10
Third places (1): 2008–09

Ataşehir Belediyespor
Winners (3): 2010–11, 2011–12, 2017–18
Runners-up (1): 2012–13
Third places (1):2015–17

Konak Belediyespor
Winners (2): 2013–14, 2014–15

ALG Spor
Runners-ups (1): 2018–19

Beşiktaş J.K.
Winners (1): 2020–21

Fenerbahçe
Winners (1): 2025–26
