= 2023–24 Turkish Women's Football Super League =

Turkish Women's Football Super League
- Season: 2023–24
- Dates: 27 August 2023 – 5 May 2024
- Champions: Galatasaray
- Promoted: Beylerbeyi; Gaziantep Asya
- Relegated: Ataşehir Belediyespor; 1207 Antalyaspor; Adana İdman Yurdu
- Champions League: Galatasaray
- Matches: 240
- Goals: 805 (3.35 per match)
- Top goalscorer: Armisa Kuč; Yağmur Uraz
- Biggest home win: Fenerbahçe 10-1 Ataşehir Belediyespor (28 April 2024))
- Biggest away win: 1207 Antalyaspor 0-10 Ankara BB Fomget GSK (3 March 2024)
- Highest scoring: Fenerbahçe 10-1 Ataşehir Belediyespor (28 April 2024)
- Longest winning run: 9 matches by Galatasaray (8 October 2023 - 10 January 2024)
- Longest unbeaten run: 14 matches by Adana İdman yurdu (1 October 2023 - 28 January 2024)
- All statistics correct as of 5 May 2024.

The 2023–24 Turkish Women's Football Super League (Turkish: Turkcell Kadın Futbol Süper Ligi 2023–2024 Sezonu) is the 28th season of Turkey's top women's football league.

A total of 16 teams, 14 from the 2022–23 Women's Super League season and 2 from the 2022–23 Turkish Women's Football First League season, compete in a round-robin format. The league started on 27 August 2023 and ended on 5 May 2024. The fixtures were announced on 1 August 2023.

The 2023-24 Turkish Women's Football Super League season ended after 30 rounds on 5 May 2024. Galatasaray S.K. became champion, and is entitled to represent Turkey at the Champions League. Ankara BB Fomget GSK finished the league season as runners-up and Fenerbahçe S.K. placed third.

The three bottom end teams Ataşehir Belediyespor, 1207 Antalyaspor and Adana İdman Yurdu are relegated to the Turkish Women's Football First League for the next season.

Montenegrin Armisa Kuč of Ankara BB Fomget GSK and Turkish Yağmur Uraz of Fenerbahçe S.K. shared the "Top goalscorer" title with 25 foals. Marie Ngah of Hakkarigücü from Cameroon placed next with 20 goals.

== Teams ==
Location of teams in Turkey in the 2023–24 season of Turkish Women's Football Super League
Location of teams in Istanbul in the 2023–24 season of Turkish Women's Football Super League

Season 2023–24
Team	Hometown	Ground	Capacity	2022–23 finish
1207 Antalya Spor	Antalya	Zeytinköy Stadium's Field #3		—
Adana İdmanyurduspor	Adana	Gençlik Stadium	2,000	—
ALG Spor	Gaziantep	Batur Stadium		Semifinalist
Amed Sportif Faaliyetler	Diyarbakır	Talaytepe Sports Facility		Quarterfinalist
Ataşehir Belediyespor	Istanbul	Yeni Sahra Stadium	700	—
Beşiktaş J.K.	Istanbul	İBB GOP Halit Kıvanç City Stadium	5,000	Quarterfinalist
Beylerbeyi	Istanbul	Beylerbeyi 75. Yıl Stadium	5,000	—
Fatih Karagümrük S.K.	Istanbul	Vefa Stadium	5,500	Quarterfinalist
Fatih Vatan Spor	Istanbul	Fatih Mimar Sinan Stadium		Quarterfinalist
Fenerbahçe S.K.	Istanbul	Fenerbahçe Lefter Küçükandonyadis Stadium	200	Runners-up
Ankara BB Fomget GS	Ankara	Batıkent Stadium		Champions
Galatasaray S.K.	Istanbul	Florya Metin Oktay Facilities		Semifinalist
Gaziantep Asyaspor	Gaziantep	Aktoprak Futbol Sahası		First League play-off winner
Hakkarigücü Spor	Hakkari	Merzan City Football Field		—
Kdz. Ereğlispor	Karadeniz Ereğli	Beyçayir Football Field		—
Trabzonspor	Trabzon	Mehmet Ali Yılmaz Stadium	3,000	—

== League table ==
Pos	Team	Pld	W	D	L	GF	GA	GD	Pts	Qualification or relegation
1	Galatasaray	30	23	2	5	71	29	+42	71	Qualification for the Champions League first round
2	Ankara BB FOMGET	30	22	3	5	78	21	+57	69	
3	Fenerbahçe	30	21	3	6	82	27	+55	66	
4	Beşiktaş	30	19	2	9	71	29	+42	59	
5	Beylerbeyi	30	17	6	7	68	25	+43	57	
6	ALG	30	17	4	9	51	36	+15	55	
7	Fatih Karagümrük	30	15	7	8	60	33	+27	52	
8	Hakkarigücü	30	13	4	13	51	58	−7	43	
9	Kdz. Ereğli Bld.	30	11	6	13	40	40	0	39	
10	Amed	30	9	8	13	42	54	−12	35	
11	Trabzonspor	30	9	6	15	34	44	−10	33	
12	Fatih Vatan	30	9	3	18	42	58	−16	30	
13	Gaziantep Asyaspor	30	7	5	18	52	75	−23	26	
14	Ataşehir Bld.	30	5	7	18	30	76	−46	22	Relegation to the Turkish Women's Football First League
15	1207 Antalyaspor	30	4	8	18	22	76	−54	20	Relegation to the Turkish Women's Football First League
16	Adana İdmanyurdu	30	1	2	27	11	124	−113	5	Relegation to the Turkish Women's Football First League

Source: TFF.org

== Top goalscorers ==
As of 5 May 2024

Rank	Player	Team	GS	Pld	AG	Ref.
1	(Montenegro) Armisa Kuč	Ankara BB FOMGET	25	30	0.83	
1	(Turkey) Yağmur Uraz	Fenerbahçe S.K.	25	30	0.83	
3	(Cameroon) Marie Ngah	Hakkarigücü Spor	20	22	0.91	
4	(Belarus) Karina Olkhovik	ALG Spor	16	29	0.55	
4	(Namibia) Zenatha Coleman	Ankara BB FOMGET	16	30	0.53	
6	(Angola) Patricia Seteco	ALG Spor	15	21	0.71	
6	(Turkey) Ebru Topçu	Galatasaray S.K.	15	29	0.52	
8	(Nigeria) Taiwo Lawal	Ataşehir Belediyespor	14	29	0.48	
8	(Brazil) Giovânia	Gaziantep Asya S.K.	14	30	0.47	
10	(Turkey) Neslihan Demirdögen	Fatih Vatan Spor	13	25	0.52	

== Hat-tricks and more ==
As of 5 May 2024.

Player	Scored	For	Against	Result	Date	Ref.
(Montenegro) Armisa Kuč	5	Ankara BB FOMGET	Adana İdman Yurdu	9–0	2 September 2023	
(Turkey) Yağmur Uraz	3	Fenerbahçe S.K.	Kdz. Ereğli Belediye Spor	3–1	16 September 2023	
(Turkey) Yağmur Uraz	3	Fenerbahçe S.K.	1207 Antalya Spor	4–0	1 October 2023	
(Brazil) Rhaizza Cabral	3	Beylerbeyi S.K.	Adana İdman Yurdu	6–0	21 October 2023	
(Turkey) Neslihan Demirdögen	3	Fatih Vatan Spor	Gaziantep Asya Spor	4–5	23 December 2023	
(Turkey) Yağmur Uraz	3	Fenerbahçe S.K.	Hakkarigücü Spor	6–0	20 January 2024	
(Angola) Patricia Seteco	3	ALG Spor	Amed S.F.K.	3–2	20 January 2024	
(Cameroon) Marie Ngah	3	Hakkarigücü Spor	1207 Antalyaspor	3–1	17 February 2024	
(Montenegro) Armisa Kuč	4	Ankara BB FOMGET	1207 Antalya Spor	10–0	3 March 2024	
(Turkey) Elanur Laçin	3	Galatasaray S.K.	Adana İdman Yurdu	7–0	17 March 2024	
(Mali) Saratou Traoré	3	Fatih Karagümrük S.K.	Ankara BB FOMGET	3–1	17 March 2024	
(Hungary) Sara Pusztai	3	Beşiktaş J.K.	Adana İdman Yurdu	7–0	24 March 2024	
(England) Shameeka Fishley	3	Beşiktaş J.K.	Fenerbahçe S.K.	4–2	30 March 2024	
(Democratic Republic of the Congo) Grâce Mfwamba	3	Trabzonspor	Adana İdman Yurdu	6–0	14 April 2024	
(Turkey) Zeynep Bilir	3	Beylerbeyi S.K.	1207 Antalya Spor	5–1	21 April 2024	
(Kenya) Mwanalima Adam	3	Hakkarigücü Spor	Trabzonspor	6–2	28 April 2024	
(Montenegro) Armisa Kuč	3	Ankara BB FOMGET	Amed S.F.K.	4–0	28 April 2024	
(Turkey) Mesude Alayont	3	Fenerbahçe S.K.	Ataşehir Belediyespor	10–1	28 April 2024	
(Nigeria) Blessing Nkor	3	Gaziantep Asya Spor	Adana İdman Yurdu	6–0	28 April 2024	
(Turkey) Yağmur Uraz	3	Fenerbahçe S.K.	Adana İdman Yurdu	6–0	5 May 2024	
(Bosnia and Herzegovina) Marija Aleksić	3	Beşiktaş J.K.	1207 Antalyaspor	9–0	5 May 2024	

== Crystal Feet Awards ==
A "Crystal Feet Award" (Turkish: Kristal Ayaklar Ödülü) ceremony was organized by the Women's Footballers Association (Turkish: Kadın Futbolcular Derneği) in Ankara for the first time on 19 August 2024. The award aims to support the Turkish Women's Football Super League and to contribute to the development of women's football. In the ceremony, which was attended by the Minister of Youth and Sports and the Minister of Family and Social Services, following awards were given:

Golden Crystal for Sportswoman	Cemile Timur (Hakkarigücü Spor, head coach and footballer)
Golden Crystal for Team	Ağrı ASP GSK Women' Football team
Best Team	Galatasaray S.K.
Best Youth Academy Team	Dudullu Spor
Fair Play Team	Fatih Vatan S.K. ( Hasan Büyükdoğan, president)
Most Valuable Player	Ebru Topçu (Galatasaray S.K.)
Top Goalscorer	Armisa Kuč (Ankara BB Fomget)
Best Goalkeeper	Selda Akgöz (Ankara BB Fomget)
Best Defender	İlayda Civelek (Fenerbahçe S.K.)
Best Midfielder	Ebru Topçu (Galatasaray S.K.)
Best Forward	Neslihan Demirdögen (Ankara BB Fomget)
Best Promising Young Footballer	Nihal Saraç (ALG Spor)
