= Batur Stadium =

Football stadium in Gaziantep, Turkey

- Batur Stadı
- Interactive map of Batur Stadium
- Address: İbrahim Tevfik Kutlar Sok., 41, 25 Aralık Mah., Şahinbey; Gaziantep; Turkey
- Coordinates: 37.05861°N 37.39699°E

Batur Stadium (Turkish: Batur Stadı) is a privately owned football stadium in Gaziantep, Turkey.

Batur Stadium is located at İbrahim Tevfik Kutlar St. 41 in 25 Aralık Neighborhood of Şahinbey district in Gaziantep, Turkey. It is home to the football clubs ALG Spor in the Women's Super League, Gaziantep Gençlerbirliği in the Super Amateur Leagues, Işın Boru Yıldızspor and Saraygücü 1983 Spor.
