= İBB GOP Halit Kıvanç City Stadium =

Football stadium

- İBB GOP Halit Kıvanç Şehir Stadı
- Location of İBB GOP Halit Kıvanç City Stadium
- Address: Mevlana Mah., 875 Sok. 13/A
- Location: Gaziosmanpaşa, Istanbul, Turkey
- Coordinates: 41.08760°N 28.91658°E
- Owner: Istanbul Metropolitan Municipality (İBB)
- Capacity: 5,000
- Surface: Artificial turf

İBB GOP Halit Kıvanç City Stadium (Turkish: İBB GOP Halit Kıvanç Şehir Stadı) is a football stadium of the Istanbul Metropolitan Municipality (Turkish: İstanbul Büyükşehir Belediyesi, İBB) at Gaziosmanpaşa (GOP) district in Istanbul, Turkey. It is named in honor of Halit Kıvanç (1925–2022), sports journalist, radio and television presenter, humorist and writer.

The stadium's pitch is artificial turf, and has the dimensions 68 m × 105 m (223 ft × 344 ft). Its capacity is 5,000 seats.

It is the home ground of the Super Amateur Leagues clubs Gaziosmanpaşaspor and some other local clubs. The Women's Super League club Beşiktaş J.K. play their home matches here from September 2023 on.
