= Turkish Women's Football Super League =

- Organising body: Turkish Football Federation (TFF)
- Founded: 2021–22
- Country: Turkey
- Confederation: UEFA
- Number of clubs: 14
- Level on pyramid: 1
- Relegation to: Women's First League
- International cup: UEFA Champions League
- Current champions: Fenerbahçe (1st title) (2025–26)
- Most championships: Ankara BB Fomget (2 titles)
- Top scorer: (Turkey) Yağmur Uraz (93 goals)
- Website: Website
- Current: 2026–27 Turkish Women's Football Super League

The Turkish Women's Football Super League, also known as Suwen Women's Football Super League for sponsorship reasons (Turkish: Suwen Kadın Futbol Süper Ligi), is the top level women's football league of Turkey. In the 2024–25 season, 14 teams play a double round robin to decide a champion club, which qualifies for a spot in the UEFA Women's Champions League.

Formerly known as the First Women's Football League, the league was renamed to Turkcell Women's Super League (Turkish: Turkcell Kadın Süper Ligi) starting from the 2021–22 season, after a sponsorship agreement with the Turkish mobile phone operator Turkcell signed by the Turkish Football Federation on 8 March 2021, the International Women's Day. The league was known as the Turkcell Women's Super League from 2021–22 through 2025–26. Starting with the 2026–27 season, it was renamed the Suwen Women's Super League (Turkish: Suwen Kadın Futbol Süper Ligi) following a new sponsorship agreement with Suwen.

== History ==
The Turkish Football Federation established the Women's Super League from the 2021–22 season in order to contribute to the development of women's football. In the 2021-2022 season, the league consisted of 24 teams.

Number of teams by season

2021–22	24
2022–23	19
2023–24	16
2024–25	14
2025–26	16
2026–27	16

Total: 105

== Clubs ==
Location of teams in Turkey in the 2024–25 season of Turkish Women's Football Super League
Location of teams in Istanbul in the 2024–25 season of Turkish Women's Football Super League

Season 2024–25
Team	Hometown	Ground	Capacity	2023–24 finish
ALG	Gaziantep	Batur Stadium		6th
Amed	Diyarbakır	Talaytepe Sports Facility		10th
Beşiktaş	Istanbul	İBB GOP Halit Kıvanç City Stadium	5,000	4th
Beylerbeyi	Istanbul	Beylerbeyi 75. Yıl Stadium	5,000	5th
Bornova Hitab	İzmir	Bornova District Stadium		Runners-up (First League)
Çekmeköy BilgiDoğa	Istanbul	Ömerli District Stadium		
Fatih Vatan	Istanbul	Bahçelievler İÖİ Stadium		12th
Fenerbahçe	Istanbul	Fenerbahçe Lefter Küçükandonyadis Stadium	200	3rd
FOMGET	Ankara	Batıkent Stadium		Runners-up
Galatasaray	Istanbul	Florya Metin Oktay Facilities		Champion
Hakkarigücü	Hakkari	Merzan City Football Field		8th
Kdz. Ereğli Bld.	Zonguldak	Beyçayir Football Field		9th
Trabzonspor	Trabzon	Mehmet Ali Yılmaz Stadium	3,000	11th
Ünye Kadın	Ordu	Ünye District Stadium		Champion (First League)

== Past winners ==
Season	Champions	Runners-up
2021–22	ALG Spor	Fatih Karagümrük
2022–23	Ankara BB Fomget	Fenerbahçe
2023–24	Galatasaray	Ankara BB Fomget
2024–25	Ankara BB Fomget	Fenerbahçe
2025–26	Fenerbahçe	Trabzonspor

== Top goalscorers ==
Former logo used between 2021–2026

Season	Player	Club	Goals	Matches	Ratio
2021–22	(Trinidad and Tobago) Kennya Cordner	Fenerbahçe	34	25	1.36
2022–23	(Turkey) Yağmur Uraz	Galatasaray	26	21	1.24
2023–24	(Montenegro) Armisa Kuč	Ankara BB Fomget	25	30	0.83
2023–24	(Turkey) Yağmur Uraz	Fenerbahçe	25	30	0.83
2024–25	(Montenegro) Armisa Kuč	Ankara BB Fomget	30	20	1.5
2025–26	(Poland) Natalia Oleszkiewicz	Trabzonspor	30	30	1

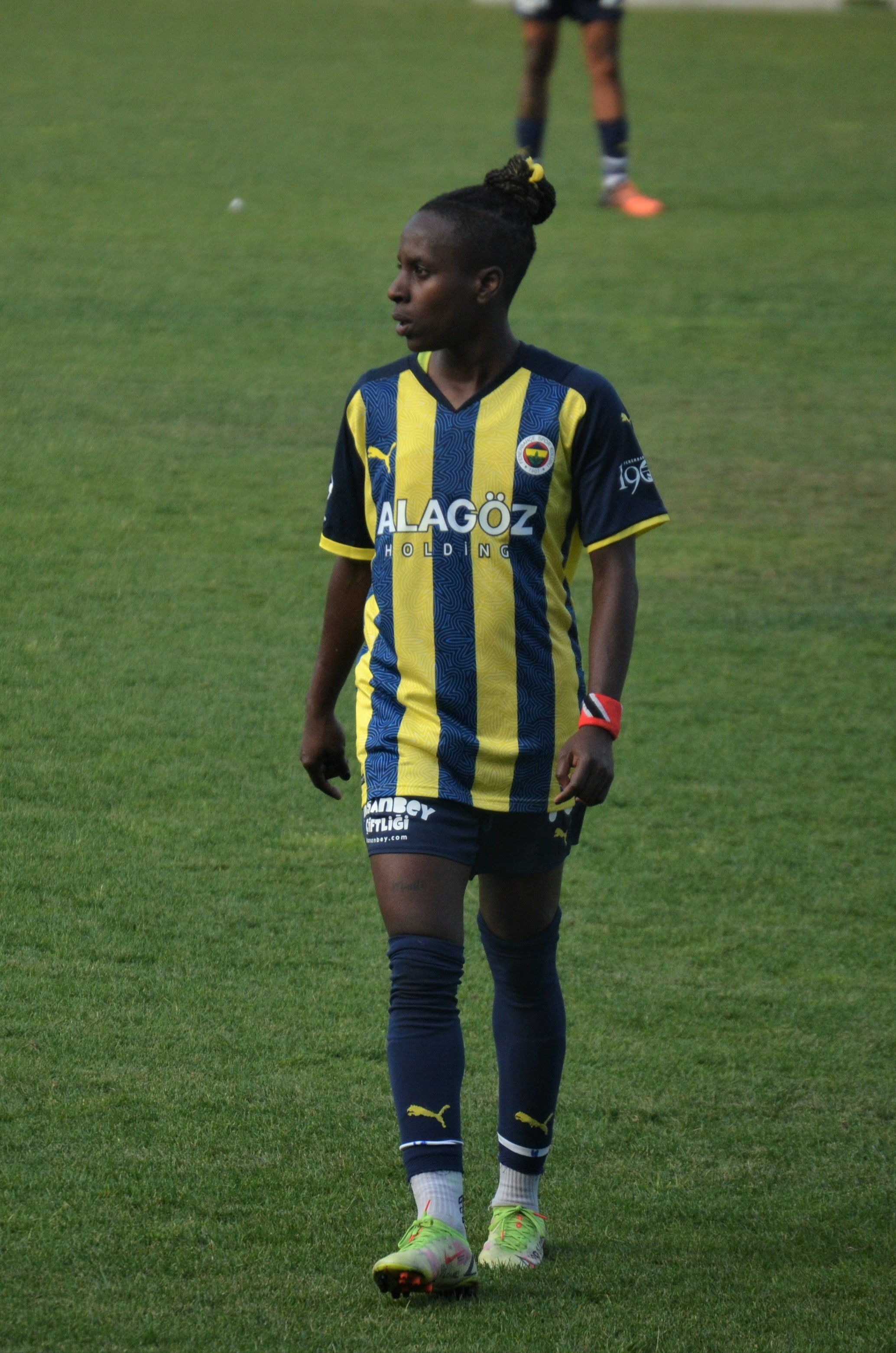
Kennya Cordner

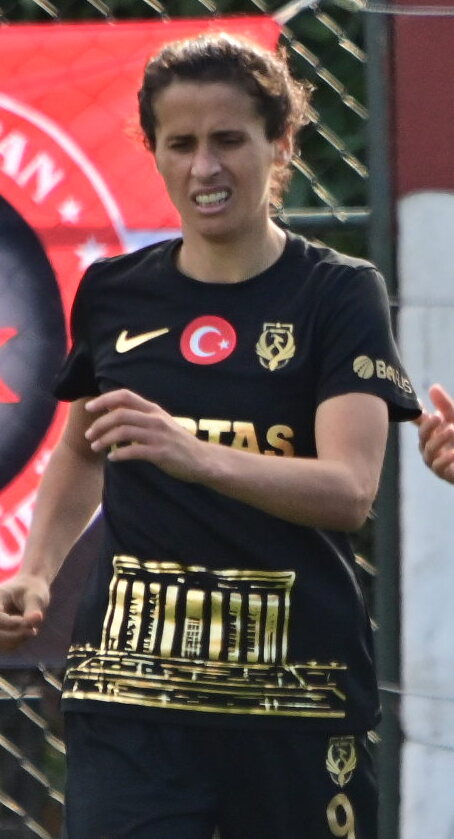
Armisa Kuč

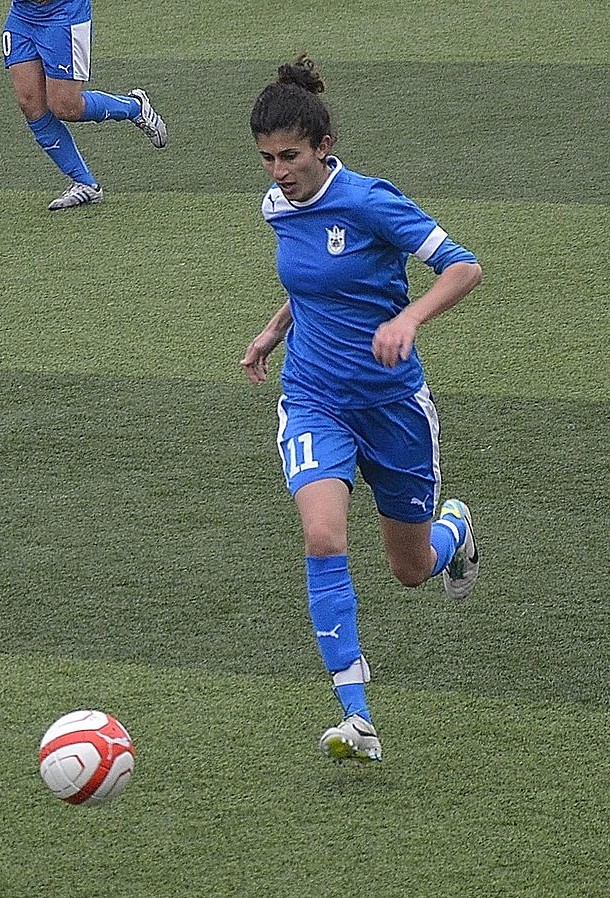
Yağmur Uraz

== UEFA ranking ==
As of May 7, 2026

Ranking			Member association	Coefficient					
2025	2026	Mvmt	Member association	2021–22	2022–23	2023–24	2024–25	2025–26	Total
22	18	+4	(Slovenia) Slovenian Women's League	2.000	1.500	1.500	3.000	4.500	12.500
27	19	+8	(Turkey) Women's Super League	1.500	1.500	1.500	4.000	4.000	12.500
15	20	–5	(Albania) Kategoria Superiore Femra	3.000	4.000	2.000	2.000	1.500	12.500

Women's Super League UEFA ranking by years As of May 7, 2026
				2004	2005	2006	2007	2008	2009
				–^{1}	–^{1}	–^{1}	–^{1}	–^{1}	–^{1}
2010	2011	2012	2013	2014	2015	2016	2017	2018	2019
42	▲39	▼40	▲39	▲27	▲26	▲24	▼25	▲21	▼33
2020	2021	2022	2023	2024	2025	2026			
▲30	30	▼32	▼33	▼34	▲27	▲19			

- ^Note 1 – Did not participate in European competitions that season.

== See also ==
- List of foreign women's football players in Turkey
- Women's football in Turkey
- Turkish Women's Football First League
- Turkish Women's Second Football League
- Turkish Women's Third Football League
- Turkish Women's Regional Football League
- List of women's football clubs in Turkey
- Turkish women in sports
