= 2025–26 Fenerbahçe S.K. (women's football) season =

Fenerbahçe arsaVev
2025–26 season
- President: Ali Koç (until 25 September); Sadettin Saran (from 25 September)
- Head coach: Gökhan Bozkaya
- Stadium: Lefter Küçükandonyadis Stadium; Şükrü Saracoğlu Stadium (selected matches)
- Turkish Women's Football Super League: 1st
- Top goalscorer: Stašková (20)
Home colours	Away colours	Third colours

The 2025–26 season was the 5th season in the existence of Fenerbahçe S.K. women's football team and the club's fifth consecutive season in the top flight of Turkish football.

Fenerbahçe were confirmed as champions of the 2025–26 Turkish Women's Football Super League on 10 May 2026, finishing top of Turkey's highest women's league for the first time in the club's history.

== Club ==
=== Board of directors ===
Position	Staff
Chairman	(Turkey) Sadettin Saran
Deputy Chairman	(Turkey) Murat Salar
General Secretary	(Turkey) Orhan Demirel
Board Member	(Turkey) Adem Köz
Board Member	(Turkey) Taner Sönmezer
Board Member	(Turkey) Ahmet Murat Emanetoğlu
Board Member	(Turkey) İlker Alkun
Board Member	(Turkey) Burçin Gözlüklü
Board Member	(Turkey) Ali Gürbüz
Board Member	(Turkey) Ertan Torunoğulları
Board Member	(Turkey) Ufuk Şansal
Board Member	(Turkey) Olcay Doğan
Board Member	(Turkey) Cem Ciritci
Board Member	(Turkey) Erdem Sezer
Board Member	(Turkey) Ozan Vural
Board Member	(Turkey) Ertuğrul Eren Ergen
Board Member	(Turkey) İlyas Yılmaz
Board Member	(Turkey) Orkan Orakçıoğlu
Board Member	(Turkey) Gürhan Taşkaya
Board Member	(Turkey) İlker Arslan
Board Member	(Turkey) Zeynep Yalım Uzun
Board Member	(Turkey) Serhan Yılmaz

Last updated: 25 September 2025
Source: Fenerbahce.org

=== Staff ===
Position	Staff
Assistant Team Manager	(Turkey) Can Sarı
Administrative Assistant	(Turkey) Semih Bozdoğan
Head Coach	(Turkey) Gökhan Bozkaya
Assistant Coach	(Turkey) Ahmet Dağ
Goalkeeping Coach	(Turkey) Alkan Birlik
Athletic Performance Coach	(Turkey) Engin Sancak
Analysis Coach	(Turkey) Oğuz Yıldırım
Physiotherapist	(Turkey) İrem Karataş
Physiotherapist	(Turkey) Buse İstanbulluoğlu
Masseur	(Turkey) Selim Can Akçe
Media Officer	(Turkey) Ataner Aygür
Interpreter	(Turkey) Semih Deral
Interpreter	(Turkey) Furkan Güzel
Kit Manager	(Turkey) Erkin Sözmen

Last updated: 25 September 2025
Source: Fenerbahce.org

== Kits ==
Fenerbahçe's 2025–26 kits, manufactured by Adidas, were unveiled on 1 July 2025 and went on sale on the same day.

- Supplier: adidas
- Main sponsor: arsaVev
- Side sponsor: Netship
- Back sponsor: Bulut Galvano
- Sleeve sponsor: —
- Short sponsor: Perios Beach House

Home
Home alt.
Away
Third
Goalkeeper 1
Goalkeeper 2
Goalkeeper 3

== Squad ==
No.	Pos.	Nat.	Player	Since	Date of birth (Age)	Signed from
Goalkeepers
21	GK	(Turkey)	Göknur Güleryüz	2022	4 February 2003 (aged 23)	(Turkey) Trabzonspor
25	GK	(Turkey)	Zeynep Akdeniz	2021	25 June 2002 (aged 23)	(Turkey) Samsun Yabancılar Pazarı
71	GK	(Moldova)	Natalia Munteanu	2024	1 December 1993 (aged 32)	(Romania) CS Gloria Bistrița
Defenders
2	DF	(Jamaica)	Konya Plummer	2024	2 August 1997 (aged 28)	(Mexico) Tigres UANL
5	DF	(Turkey)	Yaşam Göksu	2022	25 September 1995 (aged 30)	(Turkey) Konak Belediyespor
14	DF	(Turkey)	Ümran Özev	2024	1 January 1995 (aged 31)	(Turkey) Ankara BB Fomget
17	DF	(Turkey)	İpek Kaya	2023	28 October 1994 (aged 31)	(France) ASJ Soyaux-Charente
18	DF	(Belgium)	Zoë Van Eynde	2024	29 September 1999 (aged 26)	(Belgium) Standard Liège
95	DF	(Ivory Coast)	Mariam Diakité	2025	11 April 1995 (aged 31)	(France) Fleury
Midfielders
6	MF	(Nigeria)	Regina Otu	2024	5 August 1996 (aged 29)	(France) Saint-Étienne
8	MF	(Turkey)	Cansu Gürel	2022	30 January 2002 (aged 24)	(Turkey) Konak Belediyespor
9	MF	(Turkey)	Busem Şeker	2022	19 July 1998 (aged 27)	(Turkey) Konak Belediyespor
10	MF	(Turkey)	Ece Türkoğlu (vice-captain)	2023	14 April 1999 (aged 27)	(United States) Old Dominion Monarchs
16	MF	(Azerbaijan)	Peritan Bozdağ	2025	15 June 1999 (aged 26)	(Turkey) Fatih Vatan
19	MF	(Turkey)	Mesude Alayont	2023	1 January 2003 (aged 23)	(Turkey) Beşiktaş
20	MF	(Panama)	Marta Cox	2025	20 July 1997 (aged 28)	(Mexico) Club Tijuana
23	MF	(Turkey)	Fatoş Yıldırım	2024	28 March 1994 (aged 32)	(Turkey) Ankara BB Fomget
29	MF	(Turkey)	Mevlüde Okuyan	2023	29 November 2008 (aged 17)	(Turkey) Hatayspor
Forwards
11	FW	(Turkey)	Yağmur Uraz (captain)	2023	19 February 1990 (aged 36)	(Turkey) Galatasaray
13	FW	(Turkey)	Zeynep Kerimoğlu	2022	13 May 2003 (aged 23)	(Turkey) Beşiktaş
22	FW	(Nigeria)	Flourish Sabastine	2025	20 October 2004 (aged 21)	(Turkey) Galatasaray
24	FW	(Democratic Republic of the Congo)	Olga Massombo	2026	20 April 1999 (aged 27)	(United States) Tampa Bay Sun
27	FW	(United States)	Elena Gracinda Santos	2025	6 February 1997 (aged 29)	(Turkey) Beylerbeyi
31	FW	(Belarus)	Karina Olkhovik	2024	17 June 2000 (aged 25)	(Turkey) ALG Spor
77	FW	(Czech Republic)	Andrea Stašková	2025	12 May 2000 (aged 26)	(Turkey) Galatasaray
93	FW	(Brazil)	Maria Alves	2026	7 July 1993 (aged 32)	(Turkey) Ankara BB Fomget
99	FW	(Costa Rica)	María Paula Salas	2025	12 July 2002 (aged 23)	(Mexico) Atlas

- Last updated: 6 February 2026
- Source: Fenerbahce.org

== Transfers ==
=== In ===
No.	Pos.	Nat.	Player	Moving from	Date	Source
Summer
7	FW	(United States)	Elena Gracinda Santos	(Turkey) Beylerbeyi	14 July 2025	
16	MF	(Azerbaijan)	Peritan Bozdağ	(Turkey) Fatih Vatan	14 July 2025	
99	FW	(Costa Rica)	María Paula Salas	(Mexico) Atlas	18 July 2025	
77	FW	(Czech Republic)	Andrea Stašková	(Turkey) Galatasaray Gain	18 July 2025	
22	FW	(Nigeria)	Flourish Sabastine	(Turkey) Galatasaray Gain	18 July 2025	
15	MF	(Sweden)	Olivia Alcaide	(Sweden) Jitex	2 August 2025	
1	GK	(Argentina)	Abigaíl Chaves	Universidad de Chile	8 September 2025	
Winter
24	FW	(Democratic Republic of the Congo)	Olga Massombo	(United States) Tampa Bay Sun	19 January 2026	
93	FW	(Brazil)	Maria Alves	(Turkey) Ankara BB Fomget	6 February 2026	

=== Out ===
No.	Pos.	Nat.	Player	Moving to	Date	Source
Summer
22	DF	(Turkey)	Berfin Elif Ceylan	(Turkey) Çekmeköy BilgiDoğa	12 June 2025	
99	DF	(Turkey)	Derya Arhan	(Turkey) Yüksekova	12 June 2025	
8	FW	(Brazil)	Marta Cintra	(Turkey) Galatasaray Gain	12 June 2025	
77	DF	(Poland)	Dżesika Jaszek	(Poland) GKS Katowice	12 June 2025	
7	FW	(Haiti)	Roselord Borgella	(Mexico) Tijuana	17 September 2025	
Winter
15	MF	(Sweden)	Olivia Alcaide	(Germany) Carl Zeiss Jena	21 January 2026	
1	GK	(Argentina)	Abigaíl Chaves	(Germany) 1. FC Nürnberg	10 February 2026	

=== Contract renewals ===
No.	Pos.	Nat.	Name	Date	Until	Source
11	FW	(Turkey)	Yağmur Uraz	14 July 2025	30 June 2026	
10	MF	(Turkey)	Ece Türkoğlu	14 July 2025	30 June 2026	
17	DF	(Turkey)	İpek Kaya	14 July 2025	30 June 2026	
5	DF	(Turkey)	Yaşam Göksu	14 July 2025	30 June 2026	
71	GK	(Moldova)	Natalia Munteanu	14 July 2025	30 June 2026	
21	GK	(Turkey)	Göknur Güleryüz	14 July 2025	30 June 2026	
25	GK	(Turkey)	Zeynep Akdeniz	14 July 2025	30 June 2026	
2	DF	(Jamaica)	Konya Plummer	14 July 2025	30 June 2026	
14	DF	(Turkey)	Ümran Özev	14 July 2025	30 June 2026	
9	MF	(Turkey)	Busem Şeker	14 July 2025	30 June 2026	
8	MF	(Turkey)	Cansu Gürel	14 July 2025	30 June 2026	
23	FW	(Turkey)	Fatoş Yıldırım	14 July 2025	30 June 2026	
19	MF	(Turkey)	Mesude Alayont	14 July 2025	30 June 2026	
29	MF	(Turkey)	Mevlüde Okuyan	14 July 2025	30 June 2026	
31	FW	(Belarus)	Karyna Alkhovik	14 July 2025	30 June 2026	
7	FW	(Haiti)	Roselord Borgella	14 July 2025	30 June 2026	
13	FW	(Turkey)	Zeynep Kerimoğlu	14 July 2025	30 June 2026	

== Pre-season ==
Win Draw Loss Fixtures

16 August 2025 Friendly	Fenerbahçe arsaVev (Turkey)	7–0	(Turkey) Düzcespor U14	Düzce
	Salas; Uraz; Stašková; Sabastine	Report		Stadium: Düzce Topuk Yaylası Facilities

19 August 2025 Friendly	Fenerbahçe arsaVev (Turkey)	6–1	(Turkey) Sakaryaspor U14	Düzce
	Uraz; Stašková; Cox; Alcaide	Report		Stadium: Düzce Topuk Yaylası Facilities

30 August 2025 Friendly	Fenerbahçe arsaVev (Turkey)	2–1	(Georgia (country)) WFC Nike Lusso	Istanbul
	Uraz; Türkoğlu	Report		Stadium: Lefter Küçükandonyadis Stadium

5 September 2025 Friendly	Fenerbahçe arsaVev (Turkey)	2–0	(Georgia (country)) WFC Nike Lusso	Istanbul
	Cox; Borgella (pen.)	Report		Stadium: Lefter Küçükandonyadis Stadium

== Competitions ==
=== Overall record ===
Competition	First match	Last match	Starting round	Final position	Record							
Competition	First match	Last match	Starting round	Final position	Pld	W	D	L	GF	GA	GD	Win %
Super League	21 September 2025	24 May 2026	Matchday 1	Winners	30	27	2	1	136	9	+127	90.00
Total					30	27	2	1	136	9	+127	90.00

Source: FootyStats

=== Turkish Women's Football Super League ===
==== League table ====
Pos	Team	Pld	W	D	L	GF	GA	GD	Pts	Qualification or relegation
1	Fenerbahçe (C)	30	27	2	1	136	9	+127	83	Qualification for the Champions League second qualifying round
2	Trabzonspor	30	24	4	2	106	12	+94	76	
3	Galatasaray	30	24	2	4	104	19	+85	74	
4	ABB Fomget	30	20	3	7	83	24	+59	63	
5	Yüksekova	30	18	7	5	52	16	+36	61	

Source: TFF
(C) Champions

==== Results summary ====
Overall								Home						Away					
Pld	W	D	L	GF	GA	GD	Pts	W	D	L	GF	GA	GD	W	D	L	GF	GA	GD
30	27	2	1	136	9	+127	83	15	0	0	79	1	+78	12	2	1	57	8	+49

Source: Competitive matches

==== Results by round ====
Round	1	2	3	4	5	6	7	8	9	10	11	12	13	14	15	16	17	18	19	20	21	22	23	24	25	26	27	28	29	30
Ground	A	H	A	A	H	A	H	A	H	A	H	A	H	A	H	H	A	H	H	A	H	A	H	A	H	A	H	A	H	A
Result	W	W	W	W	W	W	W	W	W	W	W	D	W	W	W	W	W	W	W	W	W	D	W	W	W	L	W	W	W	W
Position	1	2	1	2	1	2	2	2	2	2	1	1	1	1	1	1	1	1	1	1	1	1	1	1	1	1	1	1	1	1

Source: Competitive matches
A = Away; H = Home; W = Win; D = Draw; L = Loss; P = Postponed

==== Matches ====
21 September 2025 1	ALG Spor	0–15	Fenerbahçe arsaVev	Gaziantep
16:00 TRT (UTC+3)		Report	Sabastine 22', 37'; Salas 25', 52', 60', 71', 78'; Cox 29'; Otu 34'; Türkoğlu 45'; Stašková 48', 59' (pen.); Uraz 70', 87'; Alkhovik 81'	Stadium: Batur Stadium; Referee: Kemal Dizdar

28 September 2025 2	Fenerbahçe arsaVev	3–0 (w/o)	Beylerbeyi	Istanbul
14:00 TRT (UTC+3)		Report		Stadium: Lefter Küçükandonyadis Stadium; Referee: Yasin Kılıç
Note: The match was abandoned due to Beylerbeyi not appearing on the pitch.

5 October 2025 3	Beşiktaş	1–2	Fenerbahçe arsaVev	Istanbul
14:00 TRT (UTC+3)	Manya 16'; Çal (yellow card) 25'; Civelek (yellow card) 75'; Nicoară (yellow card) 77'	Report	Cox 10' (pen.), 67'; Türkoğlu (yellow card) 13'; Salas (yellow card) 25'; Santos (yellow card) 81'; Van Eynde (yellow card) 90+2'	Stadium: İBB GOP Halit Kıvanç City Stadium; Referee: Ali Bilen

12 November 2025 4	Hakkarigücü	0–2	Fenerbahçe arsaVev	Hakkâri
14:00 TRT (UTC+3)	Nasaka (yellow card) 45+2'; Ossol (yellow card) 64'; Tembo (yellow card) 75'	Report	Kaya (yellow card) 38'; Kerimoğlu 68'; Türkoğlu 75'	Stadium: Merzan City Stadium; Referee: Serkan Pınar

5	Fenerbahçe arsaVev	3–0 (w/o)	Bornova Hitab
		Report

15 October 2025 6	1207 Antalya	0–6	Fenerbahçe arsaVev	Antalya
14:00 TRT (UTC+3)	Salami (yellow card) 42'; Lamari (yellow card) 66'	Report	Uraz 29', 67'; Sabastine 33', 64'; Salas 52'; Hamri 80' (o.g.); Kaya (yellow card) 82'	Stadium: Zeytinköy 2 Nolu Saha; Referee: Mehmet Furkan Balbay

2 November 2025 7	Fenerbahçe arsaVev	2–0	Trabzonspor	Istanbul
14:00 TRT (UTC+3)	Cox 2' (pen.); Sabastine 89', (yellow card) 89'	Report	Ruess (yellow card) 50'; Troka (yellow card) 86'	Stadium: Lefter Küçükandonyadis Stadium; Referee: Sercan Yılmaz

8 November 2025 8	Amed	1–2	Fenerbahçe arsaVev	Diyarbakır
14:00 TRT (UTC+3)	Plummer 43' (o.g.); Kong (yellow card) 71'; Saiki (yellow card) 86'	Report	Plummer (yellow card) 11'; Salas 41'; Santos 73', (red card) 83'; Chaves (yellow card) 90+5'	Stadium: Seyrantepe Şilbe 2 Nolu Saha; Referee: Mehmet Terece

16 November 2025 9	Fenerbahçe arsaVev	1–0	Yüksekova	Istanbul
14:00 TRT (UTC+3)	Kaya 90+12'	Report	Çalçınar (yellow card) 38'; Arhan (yellow card) 61'; Bebia (yellow card) 63'; Hajiyeva (yellow card) 71'; Teye (yellow card) 88'; Mbiandji (yellow card) 90+5'	Stadium: Lefter Küçükandonyadis Stadium; Referee: Kadir Akpınar

23 November 2025 10	Çekmeköy BilgiDoğa	0–5	Fenerbahçe arsaVev	Istanbul
14:30 TRT (UTC+3)	Adong (yellow card) 82'	Report	Stašková 2', 53' (pen.), 55'; Sabastine 76'; Santos 90+2'	Stadium: Şile District Stadium; Referee: Çiğdem Uruç

7 December 2025 11	Fenerbahçe arsaVev	1–0	Galatasaray Gain	Istanbul
14:00 TRT (UTC+3)	Cox (yellow card) 33', (goal) 64' (pen.); Kaya (yellow card) 78'	Report	Demehin (yellow card) 20'; Hickelsberger (yellow card) 30'; Giacinti (yellow card) 61'; Cumert (yellow card) 61'	Stadium: Şükrü Saracoğlu Stadium; Referee: Hatice Aydin

14 December 2025 12	ABB Fomget	1–1	Fenerbahçe arsaVev	Ankara
14:00 TRT (UTC+3)	Mijatović 90' (pen.)	Report	Özev (yellow card) 35'; Sabastine (yellow card) 38'; Cox 59'; Bozdağ (yellow card) 89'	Stadium: Osmanlı Stadium; Referee: Adem Güneş

21 December 2025 13	Fenerbahçe arsaVev	3–0	Prolift Giresun Sanayi	Istanbul
14:00 TRT (UTC+3)	Türkoğlu 4'; Salas 8'; Sabastine (yellow card) 58'; Kaya 79'	Report	Kpaho (yellow card) 6'; Takounda (yellow card) 26'; Çetin (yellow card) 52'	Stadium: Lefter Küçükandonyadis Stadium; Referee: Alican Sağlar

28 December 2025 14	Ünye Kadın	0–2	Fenerbahçe arsaVev	Ordu
14:00 TRT (UTC+3)	Akşan (yellow card) 57'	Report	Salas 74'; Stašková 90+1'	Stadium: Ünye Çınarsuyu Stadium; Referee: Ömer Faruk Yaşar

18 January 2026 15	Fenerbahçe arsaVev	11–0	Fatih Vatan	Istanbul
14:00 TRT (UTC+3)	Plummer (yellow card) 5', (goal) 33'; Sabastine 7', 67', (yellow card) 70'; Türkoğlu 17', 20'; Şeker 23'; Stašková 37'; Cox 39'; Kaya (yellow card) 69'; Kerimoğlu 87', 89'; Uraz 90+1'	Report	İşler (yellow card) 53'	Stadium: Lefter Küçükandonyadis Stadium; Referee: Yiğit Karabudak

25 January 2026 16	Fenerbahçe arsaVev	18–0	ALG	Istanbul
12:00 TRT (UTC+3)	Olkhovik 10'; Stašková 20', 22', 44'; Haizel 30' (o.g.); Şeker 35', 41'; Alayont 46', 52'; Plummer 64'; Salas 54', 57', 59', 67'; Uraz 81', 90+3', 90+6'; Otu 86'	Report	Da Silva (yellow card) 18'	Stadium: Lefter Küçükandonyadis Stadium; Referee: Çiğdem Uruç

17	Beylerbeyi	0–3 (w/o)	Fenerbahçe arsaVev
		Report

8 February 2026 18	Fenerbahçe arsaVev	4–1	Beşiktaş	Istanbul
12:00 TRT (UTC+3)	Türkoğlu (yellow card) 29'; Şeker 47'; Plummer 51', 55'; Kaya (yellow card) 57'; Otu 66'	Report	Nicoară (yellow card) 6'; Haidara (yellow card) 83'; Pintassilgo 89'	Stadium: Lefter Küçükandonyadis Stadium; Referee: Alican Sağlar

14 February 2026 19	Fenerbahçe arsaVev	2–0	Hakkarigücü	Istanbul
13:00 TRT (UTC+3)	Stašková 15'; Otu (yellow card) 43'; Bozdaş 76'; Kerimoğlu (yellow card) 87'; Şeker (yellow card) 90+1'	Report	Kesgin (yellow card) 45+2'; Tembo (yellow card) 55' (yellow-red card) 77'; Çolak (yellow card) 61'	Stadium: Lefter Küçükandonyadis Stadium; Referee: Batuhan Gelgeç

20	Bornova Hitab	0–3 (w/o)	Fenerbahçe arsaVev
		Report

12 March 2026 21	Fenerbahçe arsaVev	8–0	1207 Antalya	Istanbul
13:00 TRT (UTC+3)	Sabastine 10'; Bozdağ 21'; Otu 45+1'; Uraz 47', 90+1'; Salas 68', 84'; Santos 70'	Report	Yasongamo (yellow card) 85'	Stadium: Lefter Küçükandonyadis Stadium; Referee: Berke Sabay

17 March 2026 22	Trabzonspor	1–1	Fenerbahçe arsaVev	Trabzon
13:00 TRT (UTC+3)	Braham (yellow card) 10' (yellow-red card) 39'; Oleszkiewicz 84'	Report	Stašková 90+1'	Stadium: Kadir Özcan Tesisleri; Referee: Yücel Büyük

28 March 2026 23	Fenerbahçe arsaVev	3–0	Amed	Istanbul
13:00 TRT (UTC+3)	Stašková 5'; Otu 14'; Şeker 34', (red card) 75'	Report	Emenayo (yellow card) 33'; Saiki (yellow card) 84'; Aguadze (yellow card) 87'	Stadium: Lefter Küçükandonyadis Stadium; Referee: Deniz Güven

3 April 2026 24	Yüksekova	0–1	Fenerbahçe arsaVev	Hakkâri
13:00 TRT (UTC+3)		Report	Van Eynde 1'; Sabastine (yellow card) 43'; Türkoğlu (yellow card) 45+1'	Stadium: Şemdinli District Stadium; Referee: Sercan Karaca

22 April 2026 25	Fenerbahçe arsaVev	11–0	Çekmeköy BilgiDoğa	Istanbul
13:00 TRT (UTC+3)	Sabastine 2'; Uraz 13', 14', 58', 63', 82'; Bozdağ 20'; Şeker 30'; Massombo 55'; Kerimoğlu 69', 79'	Report	Mas (yellow card) 31'; Şengel (yellow card) 65'; Dinçel (yellow card) 89'	Stadium: Lefter Küçükandonyadis Stadium; Referee: Uğurcan Şanlı

27 April 2026 26	Galatasaray Gain	3–2	Fenerbahçe arsaVev	Istanbul
13:00 TRT (UTC+3)	Jang 19', (yellow card) 37'; Altıntaş (yellow card) 31'; Julia Hickelsberger (yellow card) 75'; Demehin 88'; Manga 90'	Report	Stašková 41', 46'; Kaya (yellow card) 77'; Şeker (yellow card) 85'	Stadium: Florya Metin Oktay Facilities; Referee: Levent Buğra Vartemel

3 May 2026 27	Fenerbahçe arsaVev	1–0	ABB Fomget	Istanbul
13:00 TRT (UTC+3)	Türkoğlu 30'; Sabastine (yellow card) 40'	Report	Sudré (yellow card) 74'; Ruth (yellow card) 81'; İncik (yellow card) 90+4'	Stadium: Lefter Küçükandonyadis Stadium; Referee: Deniz Güven

10 May 2026 28	Prolift Giresun Sanayi	0–7	Fenerbahçe arsaVev	Giresun
13:00 TRT (UTC+3)		Report	Bozdağ 6', 35'; Alves 18'; Stašková 26'; Sabastine 45+1'; Kaya 54'; Kerimoğlu 58'	Stadium: Çotanak Sports Complex; Referee: Ömür Bozkurt

19 May 2026 29	Fenerbahçe arsaVev	8–0	Ünye Kadın	Istanbul
14:00 TRT (UTC+3)	Şeker 27', 90+3'; Alves 32'; Kaya 56'; Stašková 70', 88' (pen.); Uraz 81'; Gürel 90'	Report	Torkudzor (yellow card) 31'; Gashi (red card) 76'; Ramadani (yellow card) 87'	Stadium: Şükrü Saracoğlu Stadium; Referee: Özge Tiraki

24 May 2026 30	Fatih Vatan	1–5	Fenerbahçe arsaVev	Istanbul
14:00 TRT (UTC+3)	İriş 72'; Barut (yellow card) 76'	Report	Göksu 26'; Stašková 32' (pen.), 42'; Uraz (yellow card) 57'; Massombo 62'; Kerimoğlu 79'; Plummer (yellow card) 88'	Stadium: Belediye 100. Yıl Stadium; Referee: Vedat Güngör

== Statistics ==
Italic written players transferred/loaned out during the season.

=== Appearances and goals ===
No.	Pos	Nat	Player	Total		Süper Lig	
No.	Pos	Nat	Player	Apps	Goals	Apps	Goals
Goalkeepers
21	GK	(Turkey) TUR	Göknur Güleryüz	10	0	10	0
25	GK	(Turkey) TUR	Zeynep Akdeniz	1	0	1	0
71	GK	(Moldova) MDA	Natalia Munteanu	13	0	13	0
Defenders
2	DF	(Jamaica) JAM	Konya Plummer	22	4	22	4
5	DF	(Turkey) TUR	Yaşam Göksu	7	1	7	1
14	DF	(Turkey) TUR	Ümran Özev	19	0	19	0
17	DF	(Turkey) TUR	İpek Kaya	23	4	23	4
18	DF	(Belgium) BEL	Zoë Van Eynde	24	1	24	1
95	DF	(Ivory Coast) CIV	Mariam Diakité	10	0	10	0
Midfielders
6	MF	(Nigeria) NGA	Regina Otu	26	5	26	5
8	MF	(Turkey) TUR	Cansu Gürel	8	1	8	1
9	MF	(Turkey) TUR	Busem Şeker	24	8	24	8
10	MF	(Turkey) TUR	Ece Türkoğlu	22	6	22	6
16	MF	(Azerbaijan) AZE	Peritan Bozdağ	25	5	25	5
19	MF	(Turkey) TUR	Mesude Alayont	11	2	11	2
20	MF	(Panama) PAN	Marta Cox	13	7	13	7
23	MF	(Turkey) TUR	Fatoş Yıldırım	0	0	0	0
29	MF	(Turkey) TUR	Mevlüde Okuyan	2	0	2	0
Forwards
11	FW	(Turkey) TUR	Yağmur Uraz	21	16	21	16
13	FW	(Turkey) TUR	Zeynep Kerimoğlu	17	7	17	7
22	FW	(Nigeria) NGA	Flourish Sabastine	25	12	25	12
24	FW	(Democratic Republic of the Congo) COD	Olga Massombo	8	2	8	2
27	FW	(United States) USA	Elena Gracinda Santos	12	3	12	3
31	FW	(Belarus) BLR	Karina Olkhovik	9	2	9	2
77	FW	(Czech Republic) CZE	Andrea Stašková	24	20	24	20
93	FW	(Brazil) BRA	Maria Alves	11	2	11	2
99	FW	(Costa Rica) CRC	María Paula Salas	19	15	19	15
Players transferred/loaned out during the season
1	GK	(Argentina) ARG	Abigaíl Chaves	3	0	3	0
15	MF	(Sweden) SWE	Olivia Alcaide	4	0	4	0

=== Goalscorers ===
Rank	No.	Pos	Nat	Player	Süper Lig	Total
1	77	FW	(Czech Republic)	Andrea Stašková	20	20
2	11	FW	(Turkey)	Yağmur Uraz	16	16
3	99	FW	(Costa Rica)	María Paula Salas	15	15
4	22	FW	(Nigeria)	Flourish Sabastine	12	12
5	9	MF	(Turkey)	Busem Şeker	8	8
6	20	MF	(Panama)	Marta Cox	7	7
6	13	FW	(Turkey)	Zeynep Kerimoğlu	7	7
8	10	MF	(Turkey)	Ece Türkoğlu	6	6
9	6	MF	(Nigeria)	Regina Otu	5	5
9	16	MF	(Azerbaijan)	Peritan Bozdağ	5	5
11	2	DF	(Jamaica)	Konya Plummer	4	4
11	17	DF	(Turkey)	İpek Kaya	4	4
13	27	FW	(United States)	Elena Gracinda Santos	3	3
14	19	MF	(Turkey)	Mesude Alayont	2	2
14	31	FW	(Belarus)	Karina Olkhovik	2	2
14	93	FW	(Brazil)	Maria Alves	2	2
14	24	FW	(Democratic Republic of the Congo)	Olga Massombo	2	2
18	18	DF	(Belgium)	Zoë Van Eynde	1	1
18	8	MF	(Turkey)	Cansu Gürel	1	1
18	5	DF	(Turkey)	Yaşam Göksu	1	1
Own goals					1	1
Awarded					12	12
Totals					136	136

=== Hat-tricks ===
Player	Against	Result	Date	Competition	Ref
(Costa Rica) María Paula Salas^{5}	ALG	15–0 (A)	21 September 2025	Süper Lig	
(Czech Republic) Andrea Stašková	Çekmeköy BilgiDoğa	5–0 (A)	23 November 2025	Süper Lig	
(Czech Republic) Andrea Stašková	ALG	18–0 (H)	25 January 2026	Süper Lig	
(Costa Rica) María Paula Salas^{4}	ALG	18–0 (H)	25 January 2026	Süper Lig	
(Turkey) Yağmur Uraz	ALG	18–0 (H)	25 January 2026	Süper Lig	
(Turkey) Yağmur Uraz^{5}	Çekmeköy BilgiDoğa	11–0 (H)	22 April 2026	Süper Lig	

(H) – Home; (A) – Away
^{4} Player scored four goals
^{5} Player scored five goals

=== Clean sheets ===
Rank	No.	Pos	Nat	Player	Süper Lig	Total
1	21	GK	(Turkey)	Göknur Güleryüz	9	9
1	71	GK	(Moldova)	Natalia Munteanu	9	9
3	1	GK	(Argentina)	Abigaíl Chaves	2	2
4	25	GK	(Turkey)	Zeynep Akdeniz	0	0
Walkover					4	4
Totals					24	24
