= 2024–25 Fenerbahçe S.K. (women's football) season =

Fenerbahçe Petrol Ofisi
2024–25 season
- President: Ali Koç
- Head coach: Gökhan Bozkaya
- Stadium: Lefter Küçükandonyadis Stadium
- Turkish Women's Football Super League: 2nd
- Top goalscorer: Borgella (17)
Home colours	Away colours	Third colours

The 2024–25 season was the 4th season in the existence of Fenerbahçe S.K. women's football team and the club's fourth consecutive season in the top flight of Turkish football.

== Kits ==
- Supplier: Puma
- Main sponsor: Petrol Ofisi
- Side sponsor: Papara
- Back sponsor: Ergünler Logistics
- Sleeve sponsor: En-Ez İnşaat
- Shorts sponsor: Ay Yapım
- Socks sponsor: arsaVev

Home
Home alt.
Away
Away alt.
Third
Goalkeeper 1
Goalkeeper 2
Goalkeeper 3

== Squad ==
Note: Flags indicate national team as defined under FIFA eligibility rules; some limited exceptions apply. Players may hold more than one non-FIFA nationality.

No.	Pos.	Nation	Player
2	DF	JAM	Konya Plummer
5	DF	TUR	Yaşam Göksu
6	MF	NGA	Regina Otu
7	FW	HAI	Roselord Borgella
8	FW	BRA	Marta Cintra
9	MF	TUR	Busem Şeker
10	MF	TUR	Ece Türkoğlu
11	FW	TUR	Yağmur Uraz
13	FW	TUR	Zeynep Kerimoğlu
14	DF	TUR	Ümran Özev
15	MF	GHA	Azumah Bugre
16	DF	TUR	Berfin Elif Ceylan
17	DF	TUR	İpek Kaya

No.	Pos.	Nation	Player
18	DF	BEL	Zoë Van Eynde
19	MF	TUR	Mesude Alayont
20	MF	PAN	Marta Cox
21	GK	TUR	Göknur Güleryüz
24	MF	TUR	Fatoş Yıldırım
25	GK	TUR	Zeynep Akdeniz
26	MF	TUR	Cansu Gürel
29	MF	TUR	Mevlüde Okuyan
31	FW	BLR	Karyna Alkhovik
71	GK	MDA	Natalia Munteanu
77	FW	POL	Dżesika Jaszek
95	DF	CIV	Mariam Diakité
99	MF	TUR	Derya Arhan

== Transfers ==
=== In ===
No.	Pos.	Nat.	Player	Moving from	Type	Source
Summer
8	FW	(Brazil)	Marta Cintra	(Portugal) Benfica	Transfer	
77	FW	(Poland)	Dżesika Jaszek	(Poland) GKS Katowice	Transfer	
24	MF	(Turkey)	Fatoş Yıldırım	Ankara BB Fomget	Transfer	
18	DF	(Belgium)	Zoë Van Eynde	(Belgium) Standard Liège	Transfer	
14	DF	(Turkey)	Ümran Özev	Ankara BB Fomget	Transfer	
99	MF	(Turkey)	Derya Arhan	Beylerbeyi	Transfer	
31	FW	(Belarus)	Karina Olkhovik	ALG Spor	Transfer	
77	GK	(Moldova)	Natalia Munteanu	(Romania) CS Gloria Bistrița	Transfer	
2	DF	(Jamaica)	Konya Plummer	(Mexico) Tigres UANL	Transfer	
7	FW	(Haiti)	Roselord Borgella	(France) Le Havre	Transfer	
6	MF	(Nigeria)	Regina Otu	(France) Saint-Étienne	Transfer	
Winter
15	MF	(Ghana)	Azumah Bugre	(Sweden) Norrköping	Transfer	
95	DF	(Ivory Coast)	Mariam Diakité	(France) Fleury	Transfer	
20	MF	(Panama)	Marta Cox	(Mexico) Club Tijuana	Transfer	

=== Out ===
No.	Pos.	Nat.	Player	Moving to	Type	Source
Summer
23	DF	(Turkey)	İlayda Civelek	Beşiktaş	Transfer	
10	MF	(Turkey)	Fatma Kara	Beylerbeyi	Transfer	
1	GK	(United States)	Anne Bailey Colombo		Transfer	
30	DF	(Ivory Coast)	Nina Kpaho	Beylerbeyi	Transfer	
22	MF	(Turkey)	Ecem Cumert	Galatasaray	Transfer	
6	MF	(Turkey)	Meryem Cennet Çal	Beşiktaş	Transfer	
27	MF	(United States)	Haley Berg	(United States) Dallas Trinity	Transfer	
15	FW	(Latvia)	Olga Ševcova		Transfer	
8	FW	(Namibia)	Zenatha Coleman	Beylerbeyi	Transfer	
7	FW	(Morocco)	Samya Hassani	(Netherlands) Telstar	Transfer	
Winter
3	DF	(Turkey)	İlayda Cansu Kara			

=== Contract renewals ===
No.	Pos.	Nat.	Name	Date	Until	Source
99	MF	(Turkey)	Ece Türkoğlu	15 July 2024	30 June 2025	
11	FW	(Turkey)	Yağmur Uraz	15 July 2024	30 June 2025	
25	GK	(Turkey)	Zeynep Akdeniz	15 July 2024	30 June 2025	
26	MF	(Turkey)	Cansu Gürel	15 July 2024	30 June 2025	
9	MF	(Turkey)	Busem Şeker	15 July 2024	30 June 2025	
21	GK	(Turkey)	Göknur Güleryüz	15 July 2024	30 June 2025	
4	DF	(Turkey)	Yaşam Göksu	15 July 2024	30 June 2025	
13	FW	(Turkey)	Zeynep Kerimoğlu	15 July 2024	30 June 2025	
19	MF	(Turkey)	Mesude Alayont	15 July 2024	30 June 2025	
16	DF	(Turkey)	Berfin Elif Ceylan	15 July 2024	30 June 2025	
29	MF	(Turkey)	Mevlüde Melek Okuyan	15 July 2024	30 June 2025	
17	DF	(Turkey)	İpek Kaya	15 July 2024	30 June 2025	
3	DF	(Turkey)	İlayda Cansu Kara	15 July 2024	30 June 2025	

== Competitions ==
=== Overall record ===
Competition	First match	Last match	Starting round	Final position	Record							
Competition	First match	Last match	Starting round	Final position	Pld	W	D	L	GF	GA	GD	Win %
Super League	8 September 2024	4 May 2025	Matchday 1	2nd	26	22	2	2	85	11	+74	84.62
Total					26	22	2	2	85	11	+74	84.62

Source: FootyStats

=== Turkish Women's Football Super League ===
==== League table ====
Pos	Team	Pld	W	D	L	GF	GA	GD	Pts	Qualification or relegation
1	ABB Fomget	26	23	1	2	100	19	+81	70	Qual. for the 2025–26 UEFA WCL 1st rd
2	Fenerbahçe	26	22	2	2	85	11	+74	68	
3	Beşiktaş	26	17	2	7	48	27	+21	53	
4	Galatasaray	26	15	5	6	73	33	+40	50	
5	Trabzonspor	26	15	3	8	64	23	+41	48	

Source: TFF.org

==== Results summary ====
Overall								Home						Away					
Pld	W	D	L	GF	GA	GD	Pts	W	D	L	GF	GA	GD	W	D	L	GF	GA	GD
26	22	2	2	85	11	+74	68	11	0	2	44	6	+38	11	2	0	41	5	+36

Source: Competitive matches

==== Results by round ====
Round	1	2	3	4	5	6	7	8	9	10	11	12	13	14	15	16	17	18	19	20	21	22	23	24	25	26
Ground	A	H	A	H	A	H	A	A	H	A	H	A	H	H	A	H	A	H	A	H	H	A	H	A	H	A
Result	W	W	W	W	W	W	W	W	L	W	W	W	W	L	W	W	W	W	D	W	W	W	W	W	W	D
Position	6	2	1	1	1	1	1	1	1	1	1	1	1	1	1	1	1	1	1	1	1	1	1	1	2	2

Source: Competitive matches
A = Away; H = Home; W = Win; D = Draw; L = Loss; P = Postponed

==== Matches ====
8 September 2024 1	Ankara BB Fomget	1–2	Fenerbahçe Petrol Ofisi	Ankara
17:00 TRT (UTC+3)		Report		Stadium: Osmanlı Stadium

14 September 2024 2	Fenerbahçe Petrol Ofisi	13–0	Çekmeköy BilgiDoğa	Istanbul
17:00 TRT (UTC+3)		Report		Stadium: Lefter Küçükandonyadis Stadium

22 September 2024 3	Ünye Kadın	0–5	Fenerbahçe Petrol Ofisi	Ordu
14:00 TRT (UTC+3)		Report		Stadium: Ünye District Stadium

29 September 2024 4	Fenerbahçe Petrol Ofisi	1–0	Trabzonspor	Istanbul
14:00 TRT (UTC+3)		Report		Stadium: Lefter Küçükandonyadis Stadium

6 October 2024 5	Bornova Hitab	0–3	Fenerbahçe Petrol Ofisi	İzmir
13:00 TRT (UTC+3)		Report		Stadium: Bornova Stadium

13 October 2024 6	Fenerbahçe Petrol Ofisi	2–0	Galatasaray	Istanbul
14:00 TRT (UTC+3)		Report		Stadium: Lefter Küçükandonyadis Stadium

7	Kdz. Ereğli Bld.	0–3	Fenerbahçe Petrol Ofisi
TRT (UTC+3)		Report

10 November 2024 8	Amed	0–4	Fenerbahçe Petrol Ofisi	Diyarbakır
14:00 TRT (UTC+3)		Report

17 November 2024 9	Fenerbahçe Petrol Ofisi	0–2	Beşiktaş	Istanbul
14 TRT (UTC+3)		Report		Stadium: Lefter Küçükandonyadis Stadium

23 November 2024 10	Fatih Vatan	0–3	Fenerbahçe Petrol Ofisi	Istanbul
14:15 TRT (UTC+3)		Report		Stadium: Bahçelievler İl Özel İdare

8 December 2024 11	Fenerbahçe Petrol Ofisi	4–0	Hakkarigücü	Istanbul
14:00 TRT (UTC+3)		Report		Stadium: Lefter Küçükandonyadis Stadium

15 December 2024 12	Beylerbeyi	1–2	Fenerbahçe Petrol Ofisi	Istanbul
15:00 TRT (UTC+3)		Report		Stadium: Beylerbeyi 75. Yıl Stadium

22 December 2024 13	Fenerbahçe Petrol Ofisi	3–0	ALG Spor	Istanbul
14:05 TRT (UTC+3)		Report		Stadium: Lefter Küçükandonyadis Stadium

26 January 2025 14	Fenerbahçe Petrol Ofisi	1–2	Ankara BB Fomget	Istanbul
14:00 TRT (UTC+3)		Report		Stadium: Lefter Küçükandonyadis Stadium

2 February 2025 15	Çekmeköy BilgiDoğa	0–11	Fenerbahçe Petrol Ofisi	Istanbul
14:00 TRT (UTC+3)		Report		Stadium: Ömerli Stadium

9 February 2025 16	Fenerbahçe Petrol Ofisi	6–1	Ünye Kadın	Istanbul
14:00 TRT (UTC+3)		Report		Stadium: Lefter Küçükandonyadis Stadium

15 February 2025 17	Trabzonspor	0–2	Fenerbahçe Petrol Ofisi	Trabzon
14:00 TRT (UTC+3)		Report		Stadium: Kadir Özcan Stadium

2 March 2025 18	Fenerbahçe Petrol Ofisi	5–0	Bornova Hitab	Istanbul
14:00 TRT (UTC+3)		Report		Stadium: Lefter Küçükandonyadis Stadium

9 March 2025 19	Galatasaray	1–1	Fenerbahçe Petrol Ofisi	Istanbul
14:00 TRT (UTC+3)		Report		Stadium: Florya Metin Oktay Facilities

20	Fenerbahçe Petrol Ofisi	3–0	Kdz. Ereğli Bld.	Istanbul
		Report		Stadium: Lefter Küçükandonyadis Stadium

22 March 2025 21	Fenerbahçe Petrol Ofisi	3–0	Amed	Istanbul
14:00 TRT (UTC+3)		Report		Stadium: Lefter Küçükandonyadis Stadium

27 March 2025 22	Beşiktaş	0–2	Fenerbahçe Petrol Ofisi	Istanbul
14:00 TRT (UTC+3)		Report		Stadium: Halit Kıvanç City Stadium

13 April 2025 23	Fenerbahçe Petrol Ofisi	2–1	Fatih Vatan	Istanbul
14:00 TRT (UTC+3)		Report		Stadium: Lefter Küçükandonyadis Stadium

20 April 2025 24	Hakkarigücü	1–2	Fenerbahçe Petrol Ofisi	Hakkâri
11:30 TRT (UTC+3)		Report		Stadium: Merzan City Stadium

27 April 2025 25	Fenerbahçe Petrol Ofisi	1–0	Beylerbeyi	Istanbul
14:00 TRT (UTC+3)		Report		Stadium: Lefter Küçükandonyadis Stadium

4 May 2025 26	ALG Spor	1–1	Fenerbahçe Petrol Ofisi	Gaziantep
14:15 TRT (UTC+3)		Report		Stadium: Batur Stadium
