= 2023–24 Fenerbahçe S.K. (women's football) season =

Fenerbahçe
2023–24 season
- President: Ali Koç
- Head coach: Gökhan Bozkaya
- Stadium: Lefter Küçükandonyadis Facilities
- Turkish Women's Football Super League: 3rd
- Top goalscorer: League: Yağmur Uraz (25); All: Yağmur Uraz (25)
Home colours	Away colours
- All statistics correct as of 14 October 2023.

The 2023–24 season was the 3rd season in the existence of Fenerbahçe S.K. women's football team and the club's third consecutive season in the top flight of Turkish football.

== Kits ==
- Supplier: Puma
- Main sponsor: Petrol Ofisi
- Back sponsor: Medicana
- Sleeve sponsor: —
- Short sponsor: arsaVev
- Socks sponsor: arsaVev

Home
Home alt.
Away
Away alt.
Third
Goalkeeper 1
Goalkeeper 2
Goalkeeper 3

== Squad ==
As of 27 February 2024

Note: Flags indicate national team as defined under FIFA eligibility rules; some limited exceptions apply. Players may hold more than one non-FIFA nationality.

No.	Pos.	Nation	Player
1	GK	USA	Anne Elizabeth Bailey Colombo
3	DF	TUR	İlayda Cansu Kara
5	DF	TUR	Yaşam Göksu
6	MF	TUR	Meryem Cennet Çal
7	FW	MAR	Samya Hassani
8	FW	NAM	Zenatha Goeieman Coleman
9	MF	TUR	Busem Şeker
10	MF	TUR	Fatma Kara Şahinbaş (captain)
11	FW	TUR	Yağmur Uraz
13	FW	TUR	Zeynep Kerimoğlu
15	FW	LAT	Olga Ševcova
16	DF	TUR	Berfin Elif Ceylan

No.	Pos.	Nation	Player
17	DF	TUR	İpek Kaya
19	MF	TUR	Mesude Alayont
21	GK	TUR	Göknur Güleryüz
22	MF	TUR	Ecem Cumert
23	DF	TUR	İlayda Civelek
25	GK	TUR	Zeynep Akdeniz
26	MF	TUR	Cansu Gürel
27	MF	USA	Haley Lanier Berg
28	DF	TUR	Gülbin Hız
29	MF	TUR	Mevlüde Melek Okuyan
30	DF	CIV	Zote Nina Kpaho
99	MF	TUR	Ece Türkoğlu

== Transfers ==
=== In ===
No.	Pos.	Nat.	Player	Moving from	Type	Source
Summer
19	FW	(Turkey)	Mesude Alayont	Beşiktaş	Transfer	
16	DF	(Turkey)	Berfin Elif Ceylan	Konak Belediyespor	Transfer	
1	GK	(United States)	Anne Elizabeth Bailey Colombo	(Iceland) Fjardabyggd/Hottur/Leiknir	Transfer	
24	MF	(Turkey)	Tülin Balur	1207 Antalyaspor	Transfer	
11	FW	(Turkey)	Yağmur Uraz	Galatasaray	Transfer	
29	MF	(Turkey)	Mevlüde Melek Okuyan	Hatayspor	Transfer	
23	DF	(Turkey)	İlayda Civelek	Galatasaray	Transfer	
28	DF	(Turkey)	Gülbin Hız	ALG Spor	Transfer	
7	MF	(New Zealand)	Jana Radosavljević	(Germany) Arminia Bielefeld	Transfer	
17	DF	(Turkey)	İpek Kaya	(France) ASJ Soyaux-Charente	Transfer	
20	FW	(Slovenia)	Lara Ivanuša	(Croatia) ŽNK Split	Transfer	
4	DF	(Sweden)	Emma Elisabeth Becker	(Sweden) Lidköpings FK	Transfer	
14	FW	(Canada)	Danielle Steer	(Australia) Western United FC	Transfer	
27	MF	(United States)	Haley Lanier Berg	(Iceland) Valur	Transfer	
Winter
15	FW	(Latvia)	Olga Ševcova	(Iceland) ÍBV	Transfer	
99	MD	(Turkey)	Ece Türkoğlu	(United States) Old Dominion Lady Monarchs	Transfer	
7	FW	(Morocco)	Samya Hassani	(Netherlands) SC Telstar VVNH	Transfer	

=== Out ===
No.	Pos.	Nat.	Player	Moving to	Type	Source
Summer
7	FW	(Turkey)	Setenay Sırım	Fatih Karagümrük	Transfer	
23	MF	(Turkey)	Zeynep Ülkü Kahya	Fatih Karagümrük	Transfer	
17	DF	(Turkey)	Emine Yaren Çolak	Telsizspor	Transfer	
5	DF	(Turkey)	Narin Yakut	Fatih Karagümrük	Transfer	
24	DF	(Azerbaijan)	Nazlıcan Parlak	Galatasaray	Transfer	
19	FW	(Trinidad and Tobago)	Kennya Cordner	(China) Henan Jianye WFC	Transfer	
29	MF	(Cameroon)	Genevieve Ngo Mbeleck	(China) Beijing WFC	Transfer	
34	MF	(Ghana)	Faustina Adjei Kyeremeh		Transfer	
15	DF	(Turkey)	Sevinç Çorlu		Transfer	
20	MF	(Turkey)	Altun Sancar	Hakkarigücü	Transfer	
1	GK	(Turkey)	Ezgi Çağlar	Beşiktaş	Transfer	
14	DF	(Mali)	Fatou Dembele	(Ukraine) Kryvbas Kryvyi Rih	Transfer	
27	FW	(Puerto Rico)	Danielle Marcano	FOMGET	Transfer	
18	MF	(Ghana)	Alice Kusi	(Saudi Arabia) Al-Ahli	Transfer	
Winter
4	DF	(Sweden)	Emma Elisabeth Becker	(Sweden) Umeå IK	Transfer	
7	MF	(New Zealand)	Jana Radosavljević	(Germany) MSV Duisburg	Transfer	
24	MF	(Turkey)	Tülin Balur	Adana İdman Yurdu	Transfer	
20	FW	(Slovenia)	Lara Ivanuša	(Iceland) Þór/KA	Transfer	
14	FW	(Canada)	Danielle Steer		Transfer	

=== Contract renewals ===
No.	Pos.	Nat.	Name	Date	Until	Source
10	MF	(Turkey)	Fatma Kara Şahinbaş	13 July 2023	30 June 2024	
26	MF	(Turkey)	Cansu Gürel	13 July 2023	30 June 2024	
3	DF	(Turkey)	İlayda Cansu Kara	13 July 2023	30 June 2024	
9	MF	(Turkey)	Busem Şeker	13 July 2023	30 June 2024	
21	GK	(Turkey)	Göknur Güleryüz	13 July 2023	30 June 2024	
25	GK	(Turkey)	Zeynep Akdeniz	13 July 2023	30 June 2024	
4	DF	(Turkey)	Yaşam Göksu	13 July 2023	30 June 2024	
13	FW	(Turkey)	Zeynep Kerimoğlu	13 July 2023	30 June 2024	
22	MF	(Turkey)	Ecem Cumert	13 July 2023	30 June 2024	
6	MF	(Turkey)	Meryem Cennet Çal	13 July 2023	30 June 2024	
30	DF	(Ivory Coast)	Nina Kpaho	13 July 2023	30 June 2024	
18	MF	(Ghana)	Alice Kusi	13 July 2023	30 June 2024	
8	FW	(Namibia)	Zenatha Coleman	13 July 2023	30 June 2024	

== Technical staff ==
Position	Staff
General manager	(Turkey) Eren Şenyaprak
Head coach	(Turkey) Gökhan Bozkaya
Assistant coach	(Turkey) Ahmet Dağ
Goalkeeping coach	(Turkey) Alkan Birlik
Athletic performance coach	(Turkey) Engin Sancak
Analyst Coach	(Turkey) Oğuz Yıldırım

== Pre-season ==
Win Draw Loss Fixtures

8 August 2023	Fenerbahçe (Turkey)	?–?	(Turkey) Sakarya Kadın	Düzce
				Stadium: Düzce Topuk Yaylası Facilities

17 August 2023	Fenerbahçe (Turkey)	1–1	(Turkey) Fatih Vatan

20 August 2023	Fenerbahçe (Turkey)	2–1	(Turkey) Beşiktaş	Istanbul
	Uraz; Şeker	Report		Stadium: Fenerbahçe Lefter Küçükandonyadis Facilities

== Competitions ==
=== Overall record ===
Competition	First match	Last match	Starting round	Final position	Record							
Competition	First match	Last match	Starting round	Final position	Pld	W	D	L	GF	GA	GD	Win %
Super League	27 August 2023	5 May 2024	Matchday 1	3rd	30	21	3	6	82	27	+55	70.00
Total					30	21	3	6	82	27	+55	70.00

Source: FootyStats

=== Turkish Women's Football Super League ===
==== League table ====
Pos	Team	Pld	W	D	L	GF	GA	GD	Pts	Qualification or relegation
1	Galatasaray	30	23	2	5	71	29	+42	71	Qualification for the Champions League first round
2	Ankara BB FOMGET	30	22	3	5	78	21	+57	69	
3	Fenerbahçe	30	21	3	6	82	27	+55	66	
4	Beşiktaş	30	19	2	9	71	29	+42	59	
5	Beylerbeyi	30	17	6	7	68	25	+43	57	

Source: TFF.org

==== Results summary ====
Overall								Home						Away					
Pld	W	D	L	GF	GA	GD	Pts	W	D	L	GF	GA	GD	W	D	L	GF	GA	GD
30	21	3	6	82	27	+55	66	14	0	1	48	7	+41	7	3	5	34	20	+14

Source: Competitive matches

==== Results by round ====
Round	1	2	3	4	5	6	7	8	9	10	11	12	13	14	15	16	17	18	19	20	21	22	23	24	25	26	27	28	29	30
Ground	H	A	H	A	H	A	H	A	H	A	H	A	H	A	H	A	H	A	H	A	H	A	H	A	H	A	H	A	H	A
Result	W	W	L	W	W	W	W	W	W	L	W	W	W	W	W	W	W	D	W	D	W	L	W	L	W	L	W	L	W	W
Position	5	2	4	4	3	2	2	2	2	3	3	2	2	1	1	1	1	2	1	2	2	2	2	2	2	3	3	3	3	3

Source: Competitive matches
A = Away; H = Home; W = Win; D = Draw; L = Loss; P = Postponed

==== Matches ====
27 August 2023 1	Fenerbahçe	1–0	Gaziantep Asyaspor	Istanbul
15:00 TRT (UTC+3)	Çal 50'	Report	Peka (yellow card) 45'	Stadium: Lefter Küçükandonyadis Facilities; Referee: Hatice Aydin

2 September 2023 2	Hakkarigücü	0–5	Fenerbahçe	Hakkâri
16:00 TRT (UTC+3)	Zulu (yellow card) 23'	Report	Coleman 41', (yellow card) 59'; Kusi 52', 79'; Kerimoğlu 86', 90+4'; Mesude Alayont (yellow card) 90'	Stadium: Merzan City Stadium; Referee: Yunus Gül

18 October 2023 3	Fenerbahçe	0–1	Ankara BB FOMGET	Istanbul
12:00 TRT (UTC+3)		Report	Ovdiychuk 85'	Stadium: Lefter Küçükandonyadis Facilities; Referee: Damla Tarkan
Note: The match, originally scheduled for 10 September 2023, was postponed to a later date due to Ankara BB FOMGET's UEFA Women's Champions League qualifying match.

16 September 2023 4	Kdz. Ereğli Bld.	1–3	Fenerbahçe	Zonguldak
19:00 TRT (UTC+3)	Seara 90+2'	Report	Uraz 34', 44', 66'; Çal (yellow card) 50'; Şeker (yellow card) 89'	Referee: Adem Güneş

1 October 2023 5	Fenerbahçe	4–0	1207 Antalyaspor	Istanbul
13:00 TRT (UTC+3)	Uraz 21', 28', 71'; Göksu (yellow card) 48'; Çal (yellow card) 75'; Şeker 80'	Report	Güvenç (yellow card) 73'	Stadium: Lefter Küçükandonyadis Facilities; Referee: Recep Buğra Çetin

8 October 2023 6	ALG	1–2	Fenerbahçe	Gaziantep
12:00 TRT (UTC+3)	Ursulla 33'	Report	Göksu 5'; Şahinbaş (yellow card) 38'; Uraz 87', (yellow card) 88'; Radosavljević (yellow card) 90'	Stadium: Mehmet Hayri Özkeçeci Stadium; Referee: Emre Nağaç

14 October 2023 7	Fenerbahçe	1–0	Fatih Karagümrük	Istanbul
12:00 TRT (UTC+3)	Çal (yellow card) 41'; Kpaho (yellow card) 45'; Coleman 56' (pen.); Göksu (yellow card) 90'; Güleryüz (yellow card) 96'; Şeker (yellow card) 96'	Report	Şeker (yellow card) 56'	Stadium: Lefter Küçükandonyadis Facilities; Referee: Oğuzcan Duran

21 October 2023 8	Fatih Vatan	0–4	Fenerbahçe	Istanbul
15:00 TRT (UTC+3)	Munumi (yellow card) 32'; Ataş (yellow card) 45+3'; Bozdağ (yellow card) 45+7'	Report	Coleman 17' (pen.); Şeker 41'; Uraz 51', 59'	Stadium: Fatih Mimar Sinan Stadium; Referee: Emine Öz

6 November 2023 9	Fenerbahçe	1–0	Beylerbeyi	Istanbul
14:00 TRT (UTC+3)	Cumert (yellow card) 31'; Uraz 90+5'	Report	Rhaizza (yellow card) 88'	Stadium: Lefter Küçükandonyadis Facilities; Referee: Hatem Yarar

12 November 2023 10	Galatasaray	2–1	Fenerbahçe	Istanbul
14:00 TRT (UTC+3)	Yeniçeri (yellow card) 45+2'; Şahinbaş 60' (o.g.); Kurğa (yellow card) 64'; Rith 90+7'	Report	Göksu (yellow card) 38'; Hız (yellow card) 51'; Çal (yellow card) 57'; Uraz 79'	Stadium: Florya Metin Oktay Facilities; Referee: Ertuğrul Yolcu

20 November 2023 11	Fenerbahçe	3–2	Beşiktaş	Istanbul
18:45 TRT (UTC+3)	Göksu 42'; Uraz 45+2', 79'; Berg (yellow card) 61'; Cumert (yellow card) 90+5'; Gürel (yellow card) 90+6'	Report	Manya 17'; Halilaj (yellow card) 88', (goal) 90+5'	Stadium: Şükrü Saracoğlu Stadium; Referee: Asen Albayrak

25 November 2023 12	Amed	1–2	Fenerbahçe	Diyarbakır
13:00 TRT (UTC+3)	Taş 41'; Ngoy (yellow card) 87'	Report	Berg 36'; Uraz 38'; Çal (yellow card) 71'	Stadium: Diyarbakır Stadium; Referee: Muhammed Selim Özbek

10 December 2023 13	Fenerbahçe	1-0	Trabzonspor	Istanbul
14:00 TRT (UTC+3)	Civelek (yellow card) 60'; Hız (yellow card) (yellow-red card) 67'; Steer 80'	Report	Bakradze (yellow card) 35'; Şentürk (yellow card) 63'	Stadium: Lefter Küçükandonyadis Facilities; Referee: Yunus Aytekin Atabek

17 January 2024 14	Ataşehir Bld.	1–1	Fenerbahçe	Istanbul
13:00 TRT (UTC+3)	Gören 45'; Yarlıgaç (yellow card) 79'; Bozkurt (yellow card) 90+8'	Report	Kerimoğlu 90+6'; Şeker (yellow card) 90+6'	Stadium: İBB Esatpaşa Stadium; Referee: Abdullah Murat Yoldaş

23 December 2023 15	Fenerbahçe	8-0	Adana İdmanyurdu	Istanbul
12:00 TRT (UTC+3)	Coleman 22', 56'; Şahinbaş 36'; Ezer 47' (o.g.); Berg 51'; Uraz 68', 77'; Kara 74'	Report		Stadium: Lefter Küçükandonyadis Facilities; Referee: Mustafa Demir

14 January 2024 16	Gaziantep Asyaspor	1–4	Fenerbahçe	Gaziantep
13:00 TRT (UTC+3)		Report

20 January 2024 17	Fenerbahçe	6–0	Hakkarigücü	Istanbul
--:-- TRT (UTC+3)		Report		Stadium: Lefter Küçükandonyadis Facilities

28 January 2024 18	Ankara BB FOMGET	1–1	Fenerbahçe	Ankara
--:-- TRT (UTC+3)		Report

4 February 2024 19	Fenerbahçe	2–1	Kdz. Ereğli Bld.	Istanbul
--:-- TRT (UTC+3)		Report		Stadium: Lefter Küçükandonyadis Facilities

11 February 2024 20	1207 Antalyaspor	0–0	Fenerbahçe	Antalya
--:-- TRT (UTC+3)		Report

18 February 2024 21	Fenerbahçe	2–1	ALG	Istanbul
--:-- TRT (UTC+3)		Report		Stadium: Lefter Küçükandonyadis Facilities

3 March 2024 22	Fatih Karagümrük	1–0	Fenerbahçe	Istanbul
--:-- TRT (UTC+3)		Report

9 March 2024 23	Fenerbahçe	2–0	Fatih Vatan	Istanbul
--:-- TRT (UTC+3)		Report		Stadium: Lefter Küçükandonyadis Facilities

17 March 2024 24	Beylerbeyi	4–3	Fenerbahçe	Istanbul
--:-- TRT (UTC+3)		Report		Stadium: Beylerbeyi 75. Yıl Stadium

24 March 2024 25	Fenerbahçe	2–1	Galatasaray	Istanbul
--:-- TRT (UTC+3)		Report		Stadium: Lefter Küçükandonyadis Facilities

30 March 2024 26	Beşiktaş	4–2	Fenerbahçe	Istanbul
--:-- TRT (UTC+3)		Report

14 April 2024 27	Fenerbahçe	5–0	Amed	Istanbul
--:-- TRT (UTC+3)		Report		Stadium: Lefter Küçükandonyadis Facilities

20 April 2024 28	Trabzonspor	3–0	Fenerbahçe	Trabzon
--:-- TRT (UTC+3)		Report

28 April 2024 29	Fenerbahçe	10–1	Ataşehir Bld.	Istanbul
--:-- TRT (UTC+3)		Report		Stadium: Lefter Küçükandonyadis Facilities

5 May 2024 30	Adana İdmanyurdu	0–6	Fenerbahçe	Adana
--:-- TRT (UTC+3)		Report
