= The Intercontinental Derby =

The Intercontinental Derby may refer to the following rivalries between Turkish sports clubs Fenerbahçe S.K. and Galatasaray S.K.:

- The Intercontinental Derby (football)
- The Intercontinental Derby (women's football)
- The Intercontinental Derby (basketball)
