= Flourish Sabastine =

Nigerian association football player

Personal information
- Date of birth: 20 October 2004 (age 22)
- Place of birth: Aba, Nigeria
- Height: 1.64 m (5 ft 5 in)
- Position: Striker

Team information
- Current team: Benfica

Youth career
- Unnich FA

Senior career*
Years	Team	Apps	(Gls)
2023	Bayelsa Queens		
2023–2024	Stade de Reims	2	(0)
2024–2025	Galatasaray	18	(1)
2025–2026	Fenerbahçe	25	(12)
2026–	Benfica	0	(0)

International career
2022–2024	Nigeria U20	8	(3)
2022–	Nigeria	1	(0)
- * Club domestic league appearances and goals as of 08:47, 20 May 2026 (UTC)

Flourish Chioma Sabastine (born 20 October 2004) is a Nigerian professional footballer who plays as a striker for Benfica and the Nigeria women's national team.

== Club career ==
On 6 October 2023, Sabastine signed a contract with French club Stade de Reims.

On 3 November 2024, she joined Galatasaray on a one-year contract.

On 18 July 2025, she signed a one-year contract with Turkish club Fenerbahçe.

== International career ==
She was included in the Nigeria U20 squad for in 2022 and 2024 FIFA U-20 Women's World Cup.

She made her senior international debut on 6 October 2022 in a friendly match in Kobe, replacing Uchenna Kanu for the last nine minutes of a 2–0 loss against Japan.

== Honours ==
Fenerbahçe

- Turkish Super League: 2025–26
