= Olga Massombo =

Congolese (born 1999)

Personal information
- Date of birth: April 20, 1999 (age 27)
- Place of birth: Kinshasa, DR Congo
- Height: 1.75 m (5 ft 9 in)
- Position: Striker

Team information
- Current team: Napoli
- Number: 31

College career
Years	Team	Apps	(Gls)
2020–2023	Wright State Raiders	43	(6)

Senior career*
Years	Team	Apps	(Gls)
2023	Toulouse	11	(2)
2023–2024	AP Orlen Gdańsk	21	(5)
2024–2025	Mazatlán	19	(4)
2025–2026	Tampa Bay Sun	0	(0)
2026	Fenerbahçe	8	(2)
2026–	Napoli	0	(0)

International career^{‡}
2024–	DR Congo	6	(1)
- * Club domestic league appearances and goals as of 24 May 2026 ‡ National team caps and goals as of 12 April 2026

Olga Massombo (born April 20, 1999) is a Congolese professional footballer who plays as a striker for Serie A club Napoli and the DR Congo women's national team.

== Club career ==
On February 7, 2023, Massombo signed a contract with French club Toulouse.

On July 29, 2023, she joined AP Orlen Gdańsk.

On September 14, 2024, Massombo joined Mazatlán.

On July 16, 2025, she joined Tampa Bay Sun.

On January 19, 2026, Massombo signed a contract with Turkish club Fenerbahçe.

On 7 August 2026, Massombo signed a two-year contract with Serie A club Napoli.

== International career ==
Massombo represented DR Congo in the 2024 Africa Cup of Nations.

=== International goals ===
Scores and results list DR Congo's goal tally first, score column indicates score after each Massombo goal.

List of international goals scored by Olga Massombo
No.	Date	Venue	Opponent	Score	Result	Competition
1	12 April 2026	Ratchaburi Stadium, Ratchaburi, Thailand	Indonesia	4–1	7–1	2026 FIFA Series
