= The Intercontinental Derby (women's football) =

Turkish women's football match

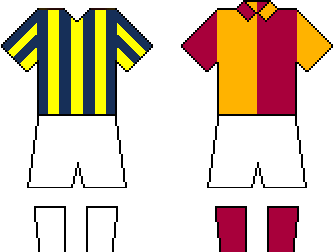
- Other names: Ezelî Rekabet (The Eternal Rivalry); Dostluk Derbisi (The Derby of Friendship) (formerly)
- Location: Istanbul, Turkey
- Teams: Fenerbahçe; Galatasaray
- First meeting: Galatasaray 0–7 Fenerbahçe; 7 December 2021; 4 years ago
- Latest meeting: Galatasaray 3–2 Fenerbahçe (27 April 2026)
- Stadiums: Ali Sami Yen Spor Kompleksi; Florya Metin Oktay Facilities; Şükrü Saracoğlu Stadium; Lefter Küçükandonyadis Stadium

Statistics
- Total meetings: 11
- Most wins: Fenerbahçe (5)
- All-time series: Fenerbahçe: 5 Drawn: 2 Galatasaray: 4
- Largest victory: Galatasaray 0–7 Fenerbahçe (7 December 2021); Galatasaray 2–0 Fenerbahçe (15 January 2023)

The Intercontinental Derby (Turkish: Kıtalararası Derbi) is any women's football match between rivals Fenerbahçe SK and Galatasaray SK. It originates in the equivalent men's football rivalry, though does not share the same history.

== History ==
=== Background ===
After Beşiktaş won the 2020–21 Turkish Women's Football League, the boards of Fenerbahçe and Galatasaray accelerated their efforts during the summer to establish women's football teams. During this period, the Turkish Football Federation president Nihat Özdemir also announced initiatives aimed at developing women's football in the country and enabling female referees to officiate in the Süper Lig. With Fenerbahçe and Galatasaray taking steps to form women's teams, followed by several other Süper Lig clubs, efforts towards the growth of women's football in Turkey gained significant momentum.

=== First matches ===
On 2 December 2021, the boards of Fenerbahçe and Galatasaray released a joint statement announcing that, with the support of The Coca-Cola Company, two friendly matches would be played between their women's football teams to raise social awareness against violence towards women. The first match was played on 7 December 2021 at the Nef Stadium and was broadcast live on FB TV, GS TV, and TRT Spor. Fenerbahçe won the match 7–0. During the friendly match, Fenerbahçe players displayed banners against gender-based violence before entering the pitch with each substitution. The second match, planned to be played in February at Şükrü Saracoğlu Stadium, was not played.

In the 2021–22 Turkish Women's Football Super League season, the two archrivals competed in separate groups and therefore did not face each other. In the 2022–23 season, they were placed in the same group. The teams met for the first time in an official match during the second week of the season, in a league fixture hosted by Fenerbahçe at the Beylerbeyi 75. Yıl Stadium. Galatasaray won the match 3–2, becoming the first side to claim victory in an official derby. In the return fixture of week 11, hosted at Galatasaray's Florya Metin Oktay Facilities, the yellow-red side won again with a 2–0 scoreline.

== Statistics ==
=== Head to head ===
As of 27 April 2026

	Matches	Wins Fenerbahçe	Draws	Wins Galatasaray	Goals Fenerbahçe	Goals Galatasaray
Women's Super League	10	4	2	4	15	14
Friendly	1	1	0	0	7	0
Total	11	5	2	4	22	14

=== Honours ===
Galatasaray	Competition	Fenerbahçe
1	Women's Super League	1
1	Total	1

=== Head-to-head ranking in the league ===
P.	22	23	24	25	26
1	1	1	1		1
2				2	
3		3	3		3
4				4	
5					
6	6				
7					
8					
9					
10					
11					
12					
13					
14					
15					
16					

== List of all matches ==
Fenerbahçe win
Galatasaray win
Draw

No.	Date	Competition	Home	Score	Away	Home goal scorers	Away goal scorers	Notes
1	7 December 2021	Friendly	Galatasaray	0–7	Fenerbahçe		Kara (10), Bozkurt (15), Fishley (31, 34, 39), Cordner (40), Sırım (51)	(Note: First ever Women's Intercontinental Derby Match)
2	22 October 2022	Super League	Fenerbahçe	2–3	Galatasaray	Cordner (25), Coleman (49)	Denda (45+3), Uraz (85), Topçu (90+1)	
3	15 January 2023	Super League	Galatasaray	2–0	Fenerbahçe	Uraz (45+3), Topçu (62)		
4	13 May 2023	Super League	Fenerbahçe	2–0	Galatasaray	Marcano (2), Kusi (62)		
5	20 May 2023	Super League	Galatasaray	2–2	Fenerbahçe	Topçu (56), Yeniçeri (85)	Marcano (1), Coleman (90+4)	
6	12 November 2023	Super League	Galatasaray	2–1	Fenerbahçe	Kara (60 o.g.), Kipoyi (90+8)	Uraz (79)	
7	24 March 2024	Super League	Fenerbahçe	2–1	Galatasaray	Türkoğlu (9), Coleman (70)	Karabulut (70)	
8	13 October 2024	Super League	Fenerbahçe	2–0	Galatasaray	Özev (62), Uraz (67)		
9	9 March 2025	Super League	Galatasaray	1–1	Fenerbahçe	Usme (71)	Cox (63)	
10	7 December 2025	Super League	Fenerbahçe	1–0	Galatasaray	Cox (64 pen)		
11	27 April 2026	Super League	Galatasaray	3–2	Fenerbahçe	Jang (19), Demehin (89), Manga (90)	Stašková (41, 46)	

== See also ==
- The Intercontinental Derby (football)
- Beşiktaş–Fenerbahçe rivalry
- Beşiktaş–Galatasaray rivalry
- The Intercontinental Derby (basketball)
- List of association football rivalries
- List of association football club rivalries in Europe
- Sports rivalry
- Big Three (Turkey)
