= Anne Bailey Colombo =

American soccer player (born 1997)

Personal information
- Full name: Anne Elizabeth Bailey Colombo
- Date of birth: May 23, 1997 (age 29)
- Place of birth: Rancho Cucamonga, California, U.S.
- Height: 5 ft 8 in (1.73 m)
- Position: Goalkeeper

Team information
- Current team: Fenerbahçe S.K.
- Number: 1

Youth career
- Los Osos High School

College career
Years	Team	Apps	(Gls)
2016–2019	UC Riverside Highlanders		

Senior career*
Years	Team	Apps	(Gls)
2021–2022	Fjarðabyggð/Höttur/Leiknir		
2023–	Fenerbahçe S.K.	2	(0)
- * Club domestic league appearances and goals

Anne Elizabeth Bailey Colombo (May 23, 1997), also known as Anne Bailey Colombo, is an American professional soccer player, who plays as a goalkeeper for Fenerbahçe S.K. in the Turkish Women's Football Super League.

== Early years ==
Competing in the Baseline League of the California Interscholastic Federation (CIF), she helped her high school team become champion in 2012, and she was named "MVP" of the tournament.

During her university years, she was a member of the college soccer team UC Riverside Highlanders from 2016 to 2019. In 2018, she was mentioned by her coach as a candidate of turning pro thanks to her nationwide fifth rank as a goalkeeper.

== Club career ==
Between 2021 and 2022, she played in Iceland for Fjarðabyggð/Höttur/Leiknir in the league 2. deild kvenn.

In July 2023, she moved to Turkey and signed with the Istanbul-based club Fenerbahçe S.K. to play in the Super League.

She is 5 ft 8 in (1.73 m) tall, and plays as goalkeeper.

== Personal life ==
Anne Elizabeth Bailey was born to Sean, a goalkeeper coach, and Lisa Bailey in Rancho Cucamonga, California, United States on May 23, 1997.

After graduating from Los Osos High School, she studied at the University of California, Riverside between 2015 and 2019.
