= Natalia Munteanu =

Moldovan footballer (born 1993)

Personal information
- Date of birth: 1 December 1993 (age 32)
- Place of birth: Ungheni, Moldova
- Position: Goalkeeper

Team information
- Current team: Fenerbahçe
- Number: 71

Senior career*
Years	Team	Apps	(Gls)
2012–2016	Nadezhda	70	(31)
2017	Donchanka	6	(0)
2018	Niva-BelCard Grodno	16	(1)
2019-2020	Anenii Noi	0	(0)
2020–2022	Dinamo-BGU	22	(1)
2022	Minsk	2	(0)
2024–	Fenerbahçe	21	(0)

International career^{‡}
	Moldova	43	(3)
- * Club domestic league appearances and goals as of 30 July 2025 ‡ National team caps and goals as of 30 July 2025

Natalia Munteanu (born 1 December 1993) is a Moldovan women's football goalkeeper who plays for the Turkish Super League club Fenerbahçe, and the Moldova women's national team.

== Club career ==
Between 2012 and 2016, Munteanu played in Belarusian Premier League for Nadezhda. She then moved to Ukraine, and joined the Top League club Donchanka. After one season, she went back to Belarus to play for Niva-BelCard Grodno in the Second League. In the 2019–20 season, she returned home, and was a member of Anenii Noi. She then went to Belarus again for Dinamo-BGU and for Minsk to play in the Premier League.

In May 2023, she suffered a knee injury that caused her to stay away from the field for about one week.

In September 2024, she moved to Turkey, and signed with the Istanbul-based club Fenerbahçe to play in the 2024-25 Super League season. Already on 16 September 2025, she became knee problems that lasted ten days.

== International career ==
Munteanu has been capped for the Moldova national team, appearing for the team during the 2019 FIFA Women's World Cup qualifying cycle.

== Honours ==
Fenerbahçe

- Turkish Super League: 2025–26

== International goals ==
No.	Date	Venue	Opponent	Score	Result	Competition
1.	11 April 2023	Marden Sports Complex, Alanya, Turkey	Haiti	1–3	1–3	Friendly

== See also ==
- List of Moldova women's international footballers
