= Regina Otu =

Nigerian footballer (born 1996)

Personal information
- Full name: Regina Ibiang Otu
- Date of birth: 5 August 1996 (age 30)
- Place of birth: Ugep, Nigeria
- Height: 1.69 m (5 ft 7 in)
- Position: Midfielder

Team information
- Current team: Fenerbahçe
- Number: 6

Senior career*
Years	Team	Apps	(Gls)
2018–2020	Edo Queens		
2020–2021	Rivers Angels		
2021–2022	Minsk	33	(7)
2022–2024	Saint-Étienne	39	(1)
2024–	Fenerbahçe	43	(8)

International career^{‡}
2022–	Nigeria	5	(0)
- * Club domestic league appearances and goals as of 26 January 2025 ‡ National team caps and goals as of August 2024

Regina Ibiang Otu (born 5 August 1996) is a Nigerian women's football midfielder who plays for the Turkish Super League club Fenerbahçe and Nigeria women's national football team.

== Personal life ==
Regina Ibiang Otu was born at Ugep in Cross River State, southern Nigeria on 5 August 1996.

== Club career ==
Otu is 1.69 m (5 ft 6 1/2 in) tall, and plays in the defensive midfielder position.

=== Edo Queens & Rivers Angels ===
In her country, Otu was a member of Edo Queens between 2018 and 2020. In January 2020, she transferred to Rivers Angels in Port Harcourt.

=== Minsk ===
In April 2021, Otu moved to Belarus, and joined Minsk on a two-year deal. She played ] in the Belarusian Premier League. She appeared in two matches at the 2021–22 UEFA Women's Champions League qualifying rounds. She terminated her two-year contract mutually with the Belarusian club after the 2022–23 UEFA Women's Champions League qualifying rounds matches.

=== Saint-Étienne ===
In September 2022, she went to France, and joined Saint-Étienne. She contributed to the promotion of her club to the French Première Ligue. Her contract was extended in June 2023 for one more season. She so played in the 2023–24 Division 1 Féminine season. She capped in 19 matches of the Seconde Ligue, and scored one goal in 20 matches played in the Première Ligue.

=== Fenerbahçe ===
In the beginning of August 2024, Otu moved to Turkey, and signed a two-year deal with the Istanbul-based club Fenerbahçe to play in the Super League.

== International career ==
Otu was admitted to the Nigeria national team, and debuted in the match against Botswana on 7 July 2022. She appeared in April 2023 in a friendly game. She was left out to the national team at the 2023 FIFA Women's World Cup. She capped five times in the national team as of August 2024.

== Honours ==
Fenerbahçe
- Turkish Super League: 2025–26
