= Zoë Van Eynde =

Belgian footballer (born 1999)

Personal information
- Date of birth: 29 September 1999 (age 27)
- Place of birth: Belgium
- Height: 1.59 m (5 ft 2 1/2 in)
- Position: Defender

Youth career
- 2013–2015: Standard Liège

Senior career*
Years	Team	Apps	(Gls)
2016–2024	Standard Liège	93	(7)
2024–2026	Fenerbahçe	47	(1)
- * Club domestic league appearances and goals as of 24 May 2026

Zoë Van Eynde (born 29 September 1999) is a Belgian women's football defender.

== Club career ==
Van Eynde plays as defender.

=== Standard Liège ===
She entered her hometown club Standard Liège in 2013. Between 2019 and 2024, she appeared in 93 matches of the Super League Vrouwenvoetbal, and scored seven goals. She experienced her team's champions titles in the Belgian Women's U16 Cup (2014), in the Super League (2016, 2017), in the First Division (2016) and in the Belgian Women's Cup (2018). She took part at the 2016–17 UEFA Women's Champions League qualifying round, and scored a goal in the game against ŽFK Skopje 2014 from North Macedonia.

=== Fenerbahçe ===
Mid July 2024, she moved to Turkey, and signed a two-year deal with the Istanbul-based club Fenerbahçe to play as a left-back in the Women's Super League.

== Honours ==
Fenerbahçe
Winners (1): 2025–26
