= Zeynep Kerimoğlu =

Turkish footballer (born 2003)

Personal information
- Date of birth: 13 May 2003 (age 23)
- Place of birth: Ümraniye, Istanbul, Turkey
- Position: Forward

Team information
- Current team: Fenerbahçe S.K.
- Number: 13

Youth career
- 2014–2017: Dudullu Spor

Senior career*
Years	Team	Apps	(Gls)
2017–2021	Dudullu Spor	39	(59)
2022	Beşiktaş J.K.	19	(11)
2022–	Fenerbahçe S.K.	64	(23)

International career^{‡}
2017–2020	Turkey U-17	14	(4)
2021–2022	Turkey U-19	6	(4)
2022–	Turkey	4	(0)
- * Club domestic league appearances and goals as of 11 December 2022 ‡ National team caps and goals as of 15 November 2022

Zeynep Kerimoğlu (born 13 May 2003) is a Turkish football forward, who plays for the Women's Super League club Fenerbahçe S.K. and the Turkey women's national football team.

Zeynep Kerimoğlu was born in Ümraniye district of Istanbul, Turkey on 13 May 2003.

== Club career ==
=== Dudullu Spor ===
Kerimoğlu obtained her license at age eleven from her hometown club Dudullu Spor on 30 May 2014. She played in the youth teams during her career until 2017. On 2 December that year, she debuted in the Third League. At the end of the 2018–19 Third League, she enjoyed her team's promotion to the Second League. The next season, her team was promoted to the First League. She was named Top goalscorer of the 2019–20 Second League with 27 goals in eleven matches.

=== Beşiktaş J.K. ===
For the 2021–22 Super League season, she transferred to Beşiktaş J.K. She scored eleven goals in 19 matches in one season, she played.

=== Fenerbahçe S.K. ===
She joined Fenerbahçe S.K. in the 2022–23 Super League season.

== International career ==
=== Turkey U-17 ===
Kerimoğlu was admitted to the Turkey girls' U-17 team, and debuted in the friendly match against Russia on 19 December 2017. She took part in one match of the 2018 UEFA U-17 Championship qualification, three games of the 2019 UEFA U-16 Development Tournament and three matches of the 2020 UEFA U-17 Championship qualification. She capped in 14 matches and scored four goals until 2020.

=== Turkey U-19 ===
She played for the Turkey women's U-19 team first time in a friendly match against Kosovo on 5 September 2021. She participated in one match of the 2022 UEFA U-19 Championship qualification, and in three qualification matches of the 2022 UEFA U-19 Championship. She scored four girls in six matches.

=== Turkey ===
On 25 June 2022, she debuted for the Turkey senior team in the friendly match against Azerbaijan. She played in the 2023 FIFA World Cup qualification (UEFA) against Portugal.

== Career statistics ==
As of match played 5 February 2023.

Club	Season	League			Continental		National		Total	
Club	Season	Division	Apps	Goals	Apps	Goals	Apps	Goals	Apps	Goals
Dudullu Spor	2017–18	Third League	13	16	–	–	5	1	18	17
Dudullu Spor	2018–19	Third League	14	16	–	–	3	1	17	17
Dudullu Spor	2019–20	Second League	11	27	–	–	6	2	17	29
Dudullu Spor	2020-21	First League	1	0	–	–	0	0	1	0
Dudullu Spor	Total		39	59	–	–	14	4	53	63
Beşiktaş J.K.	2021-22	Super League	19	11	–	–	8	4	27	15
Beşiktaş J.K.	Total		19	11	–	–	8	4	27	15
Fenerbahçe S.K.	2022-23	Super League	5	0	–	–	2	0	7	0
Fenerbahçe S.K.	2023-24	Super League	22	11	–	–	2	0	24	11
Fenerbahçe S.K.	2024-25	Super League	12	3	–	–	0	0	12	3
Fenerbahçe S.K.	2025-26	Super League	17	7	–	–	0	0	17	7
Fenerbahçe S.K.	2026-27	Super League	8	2	–	–	0	0	8	2
Fenerbahçe S.K.	Total		64	23	–	–	4	0	68	23
Career total			122	93	-	-	26	8	148	101

== Honours ==
=== Club ===
Turkish Women's Third Football League

Dudullu Spor
Winners (1): 2018–19

Turkish Women's Second Football league

Dudullu Spor
Runner's up (1): 2019–20

Fenerbahçe

- Turkish Super League: 2025–26

=== Individual ===
Top goalscorer (1): 2019–20 Second League with Dudullu Spor (27 goals)
