= Göknur Güleryüz =

Turkish footballer (born 2003)

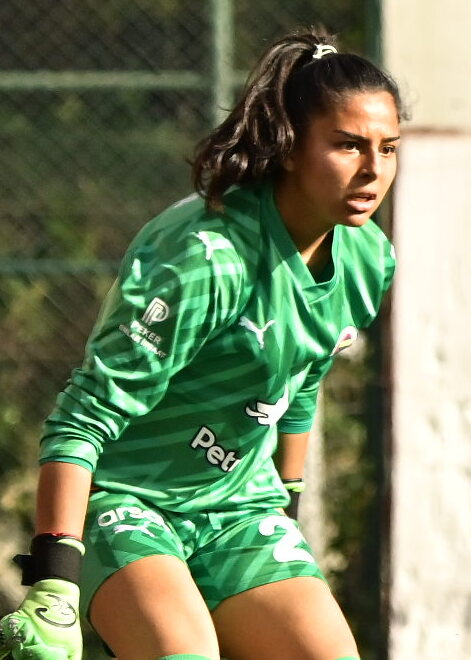

Personal information
- Date of birth: 4 February 2003 (age 23)
- Place of birth: Antakya, Turkey
- Position: Goalkeeper

Team information
- Current team: Toulouse
- Number: 99

Youth career
- 2015–2016: Birfen Koleji Hatay Defne Spor

Senior career*
Years	Team	Apps	(Gls)
2017–2020	→ Tavla Gençlikspor	24	(16)
2021–2022	Trabzonspor	22	(0)
2022–2026	Fenerbahçe S.K.	50	(0)
2026–	Toulouse	2	(0)

International career^{‡}
2022–2023	Azerbaijan	0	(0)
2023–	Turkey	1	(0)
- * Club domestic league appearances and goals as of 20 September 2026 ‡ National team caps and goals as of 5 December 2023

Göknur Güleryüz (born 4 February 2003) is a Turkish women's football goalkeeper, who plays in the Première Ligue for Toulouse with jersey number 99. She is a member of the Turkey women's team.

== Club career ==
Güleryüz started her football career during her secondary education at the age of twelve, obtaining her license from her school's team, Birfen Koleji Hatay Defne Spor, on 10 September 2015. She played in the youth club until 2016.

While still studying in the high school, she was loaned out to Tavla Gençlikspor. She played at the Turkish Girls' Youth Championships, and the Turkish Women's Third Football League. In the three seasons between 2017 and 2019, she capped in 24 matches and scored 16 goals.

After a one year break, she transferred to Trabzonspor to play in the 2021-22 Turkish Women's Football Super League.

In August 2022, she moved to Istanbul, and signed with Fenerbahçe S.K.

In June 2026, Güleryüz joined Première Ligue side Toulouse FC.

== International career ==
=== Azerbaijan ===
In November 2022, Güleryüz was called up to the Azerbaijan national team for a friendly match against Croatia. She was in the squad for two friendly matches in April 2023. She took part at two 2023–24 UEFA Women's Nations League C matches in September 2023. In all the matches, she was a substitute goalkeeper without becoming active on the field. Then, she declined to appear further for the Azerbaijan national team.

=== Turkey ===
She preferred the Turkey national team. In November 2023, she was admitted to the Turkey women's national football team, and debuted in the match against Georgia at the 2023–24 UEFA Women's Nations League C, replacing Selda Akgöz.

== Personal life ==
Göknur Güleryüz was born in Antakya district of Hatay in southern Turkey on 4 February 2003. She completed her secondary education at the private Birfen Koleji school in Hatay.

== Career statistics ==
=== Club ===
As of match played on 24 May 2026

Club	Season	League			Continental		National		Total	
Club	Season	Division	Apps	Goals	Apps	Goals	Apps	Goals	Apps	Goals
Tavla Gençlikspor	2017–18	Third League	12	10	–	–	–	–	12	10
Tavla Gençlikspor	2018–19	Third League	6	6	–	–	–	–	6	6
Tavla Gençlikspor	2019–20	Third League	6	0	–	–	–	–	6	0
Tavla Gençlikspor	Total		24	16	–	–	–	–	24	16
Trabzonspor	2021–22	Super League	22	0	–	–	–	–	22	0
Trabzonspor	Total		22	0	–	–	–	–	22	0
Fenerbahçe S.K.	2022–23	Super League	13	0	–	–	–	–	13	0
Fenerbahçe S.K.	2023–24	Super League	23	0	–	–	–	–	23	0
Fenerbahçe S.K.	2024-25	Super League	4	0	–	–	–	–	4	0
Fenerbahçe S.K.	2025–26	Super League	10	0	–	–	–	–	10	0
Fenerbahçe S.K.	Total		50	0	–	–	–	–	50	0
Career total			96	16	–	–	–	–	96	16

=== International ===
As of match played on 5 December 2023

Appearances and goals by national team and year
National team	Year	Apps	Goals
Azerbaijan	2022	0	0
Azerbaijan	2023	0	0
Turkey	2023	1	0
Total		1	0

== Honours ==
Turkish Women's Football Super League

Fenerbahçe S.K.
Runners up (1): 2022–23

Turkish Women's Third Football League

Tavla Gençlikspor
Winners (2): 2018–19 (Gr. 10), 2019–20 (Gr. 7)
Runners up (1): 2017–18 (Gr. 10)
