= Ümran Özev =

Turkish women's footballer (born 1995)

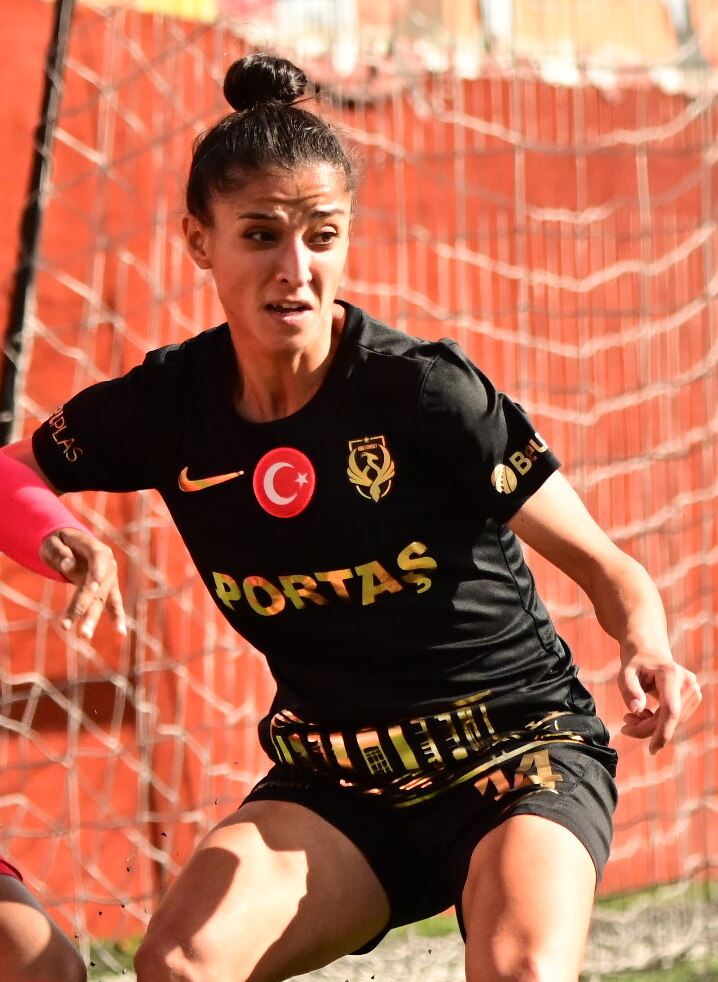
- Ümran Özev of Fomget (November 2023)

Personal information
- Date of birth: 1 January 1995 (age 31)
- Place of birth: Konak, Izmir, Turkey
- Position: Midfielder

Team information
- Current team: Fenerbahçe
- Number: 14

Senior career*
Years	Team	Apps	(Gls)
2008–2014	Konak	76	(6)
2017–2020	Hakkarigücü	43	(1)
2021	Ataşehir	4	(1)
2021–2024	Ankara BB Fomget	70	(4)
2024–	Fenerbahçe	10	(1)

International career^{‡}
2009–2010	Turkey U15	7	(1)
2010–2011	Turkey U17	9	(0)
2012–2014	Turkey U19	25	(2)
2022–	Turkey	20	(0)
- * Club domestic league appearances and goals as of 8 December 2024 ‡ National team caps and goals as of 30 May 2025

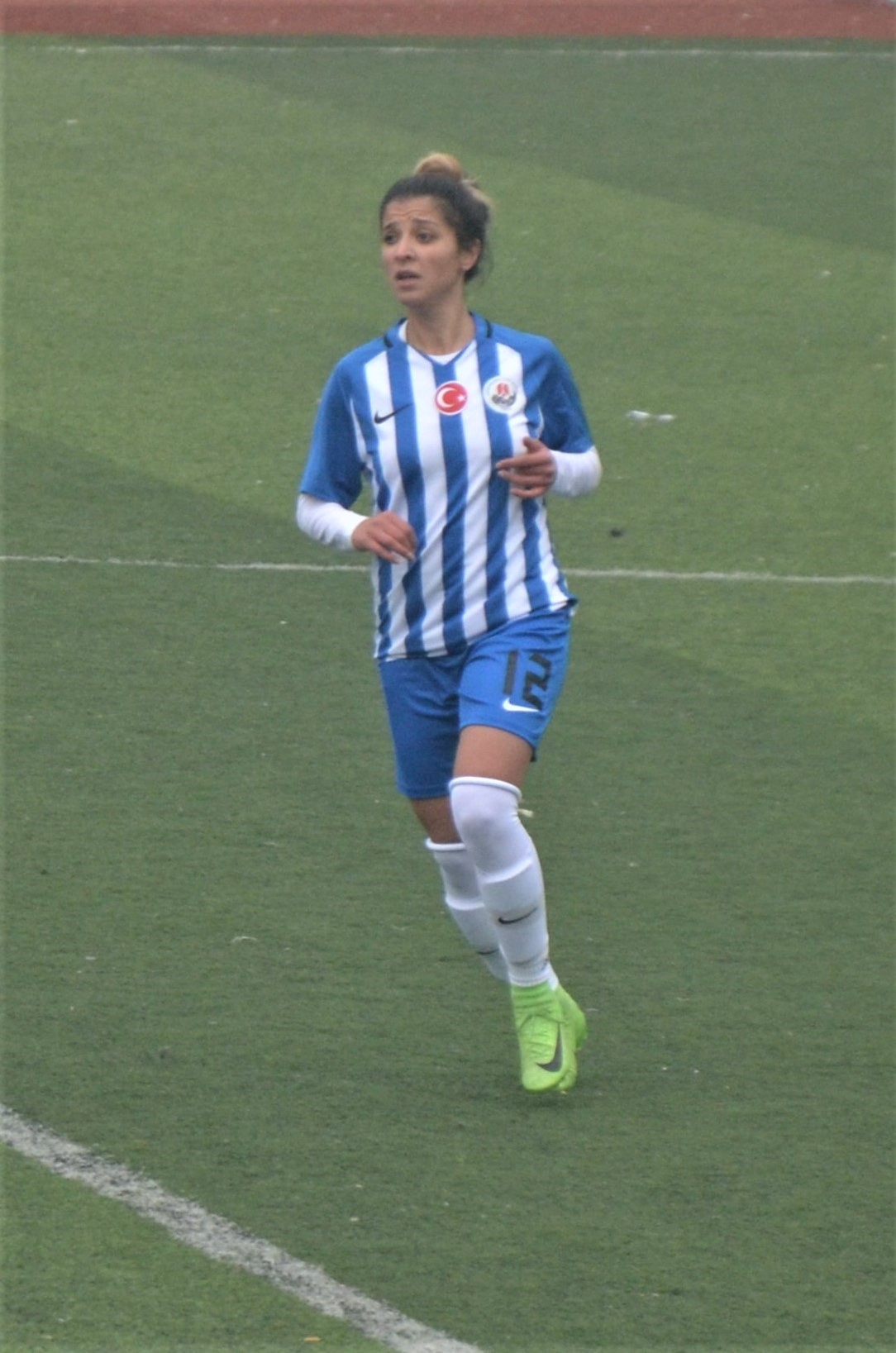
Ümran Özev of Hakkarigücü Spor (December 2018)

Ümran Özev (born 1 January 1995) is a Turkish women's football midfielder who plays for the Turkish Super League club Fenerbahçe and the Turkey national team.

== Club career ==
=== Konak Belediyespor ===
Özev obtained her license on 16 May 2008 and joined Konak Belediyespor in her hometown. At the end of the 2013–14 First League season, she celebrated the team's second consecutive title after an undefeated season.

She debuted in international competition in a 2014–15 UEFA Women's Champions League qualifying match against Austrian SV Neulengbach on 14 November 2013.

=== Hakkarigücü Spor ===
After a break of two years, she joined Hakkarigücü Spor in January 2017 to play in the Women's Second League.

=== Ataşehir Belediyespor ===
For the 2020–21 season, she moved to Istanbul-based side Ataşehir Belediyespor.

=== Ankara BB Fomget GSK ===
The next season, she transferred to ANkara BB Fomget GSK, where she won the 2022–23 Super League and played in two 2023–24 UEFA Women's Champions League qualifying matches.

== International career ==
=== Turkey under-15 team ===
Özev was selected to the Turkey under-15 team for the first time in 2009, winning the bronze medal at the 2010 Summer Youth Olympics. She was capped seven times and scored one goal for the under-15 team.

=== Turkey under-17 team ===
Between 2010 and 2011, she appeared in nine matches of the Turkey under-17 team, taking part in 2012 UEFA Women's Under-17 Championship qualification.

=== Turkey under-19 team ===
She was called up to the Turkey under-19 team for UEFA Under-19 Championship qualifying in 2013 and 2014.

=== Senior national team ===
In 2022, Özev was called-up to the Turkey national team and played in four 2023–24 UEFA Women's Nations League C matches.

== Career statistics ==
As of match played 8 December 2024.

Club	Season	League			Continental		National		Total	
Club	Season	Division	Apps	Goals	Apps	Goals	Apps	Goals	Apps	Goals
Konak	2008–09	First League	8	1	–	–	0	0	8	1
Konak	2009–10	First League	15	1	–	–	5	0	20	1
Konak	2010–11	First League	18	3	–	–	8	1	26	4
Konak	2011–12	First League	15	0	–	–	3	0	18	0
Konak	2012–13	First League	12	1	–	–	11	1	23	2
Konak	2013–14	First League	6	0	1	0	14	1	21	1
Konak	2014–15	First League	2	0	–	–	0	0	2	0
Konak	Total		76	6	1	0	41	3	118	9
Hakkarigücü	2016–17	Second League	11	1	–	–	0	0	11	1
Hakkarigücü	2017–18	Second League	15	0	–	–	0	0	15	0
Hakkarigücü	2018–19	First League	13	0	–	–	0	0	13	0
Hakkarigücü	2019–20	First League	4	0	–	–	0	0	4	0
Hakkarigücü	Total		43	1	–	–	0	0	43	1
Ataşehir	2020–21	omen's League	4	1	–	–	0	0	4	1
Ankara BB Fomget	2021–22	Super League	22	0	-	-	1	0	23	0
Ankara BB Fomget	2022–23	Super League	25	1	–	–	0	0	25	1
Ankara BB Fomget	2023–24	Super League	23	3	2	0	12	0	37	3
Ankara BB Fomget	Total		70	4	2	0	13	0	85	4
Fenerbahçe	2024–25	Super League	10	1	–	–	4	0	14	1
Career total			203	13	3	0	58	3	264	16

== Honours ==
Turkish Women's Super League

Ankara BB Fomget GSK
Winners (1): 2022–23

Turkish Women's First League

Konak Belediyespor
Winners (2): 2012–13, 2013–14
Runners-up (1): 2010–11
Third places (1): 2009–10

Turkish Women's Second League

Hakkarigücü Spor
Winners (1): 2017–18

Fenerbahçe
Winners (1): 2025–26
