= Mesude Alayont =

Turkish footballer (born 2003)

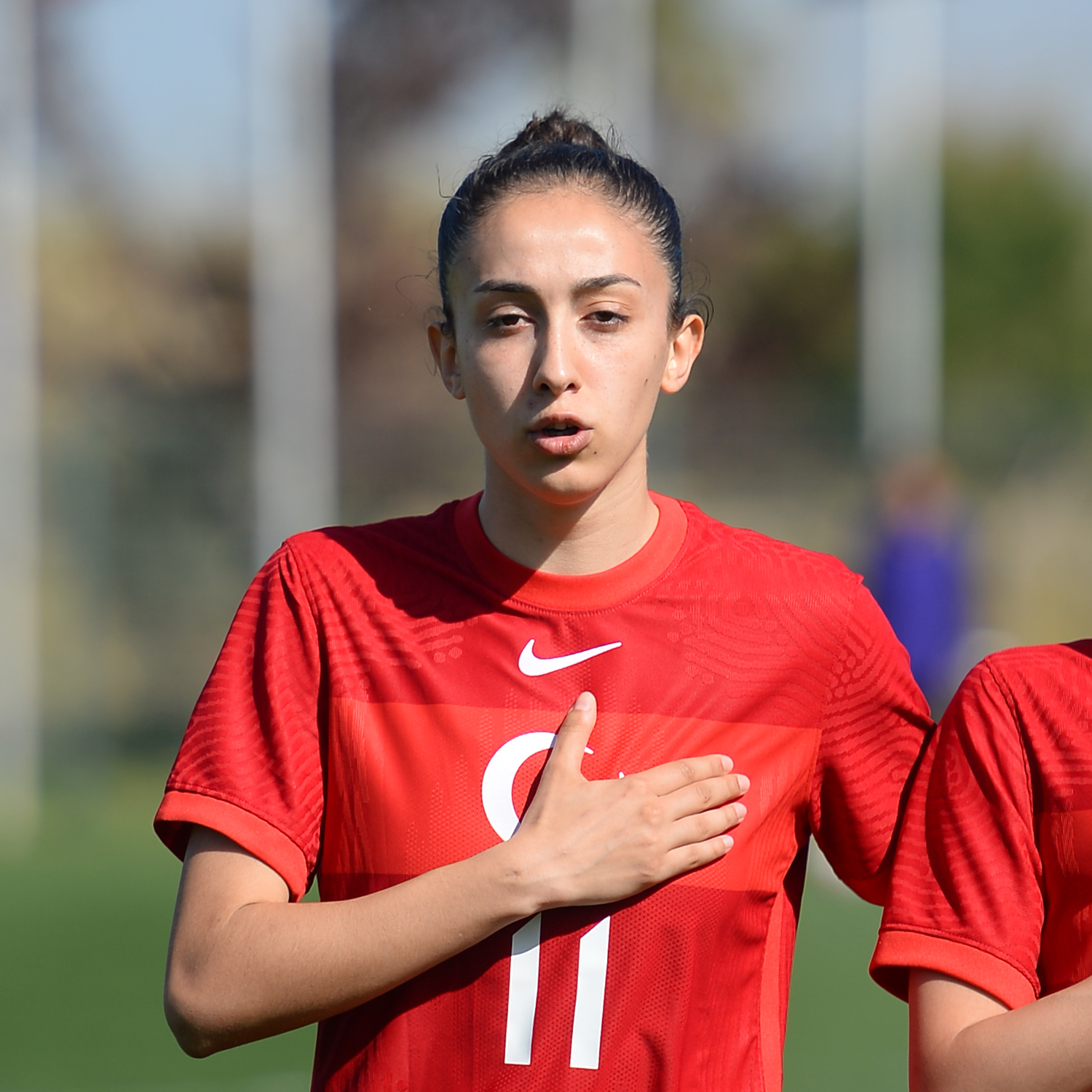
- Mesude Alayont (April 2022)

Personal information
- Date of birth: January 1, 2003 (age 23)
- Place of birth: Tavas, Denizli, Turkey
- Position: Midfielder

Team information
- Current team: Fenerbahçe

Youth career
- 2014–2016: Pamukkale Üniversitesi Gençlikspor
- 2016–2017: Horozkent Spor

Senior career*
Years	Team	Apps	(Gls)
2017–2020	Horozkent Spor	24	(66)
2020–2022	Kocaeli Bayan	18	(4)
2022–2023	Beşiktaş	27	(5)
2023–	Fenerbahçe	46	(12)

International career^{‡}
2016	Turkey U-15	2	(2)
2018–2020	Turkey U-17	24	(11)
2021–2022	Turkey U-19	6	(2)
- * Club domestic league appearances and goals as of 12:18, 16 December 2025 (UTC) ‡ National team caps and goals as of 11 April 2022

Mesude Alayont (born January 1, 2003) is a Turkish women's football midfielder currently playing in the Turkish Women's Football Super League for Fenerbahçe.

== Career ==
=== Club ===
Alayont began playing football in Pamukkale Üniversitesi Gençlikspor, a Denizli-based club in her hometown, after receiving her license on 18 December 2014. After 2 seasons in Pamukkale Üniversitesi Gençlikspor, she moved to Horozkent Spor. She previously played for Horozkent Spor, Kocaeli Bayan and Beşiktaş, respectively.

On July 14, 2023, she signed with Super League fellow Fenerbahçe.

=== International ===
In 2016, she was called up for the Turkey girls' U-15 national team, and made her debut in the friendly match against the Moldova U-15 team.

In 2018, she was called up for the U-17 national team, competing in several tournaments. On 6 February 2018, she debuted in the friendly match against Northern Ireland U-17, as a substitute in the 32nd minute. She capped 24 times and scored 11 goals until February 2020.

== Honours ==
Fenerbahçe

- Turkish Super League: 2025–26
