= Marta Cox =

Panamanian footballer (born 1997)

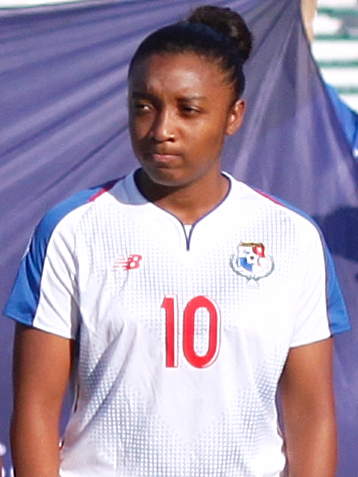
- Cox with Panama in 2018

Personal information
- Full name: Marta Alexandra Cox Villarreal
- Date of birth: 20 July 1997 (age 29)
- Place of birth: Panama City, Panama
- Height: 1.64 m (5 ft 5 in)
- Position: Attacking midfielder

Team information
- Current team: Fenerbahçe
- Number: 20

Senior career*
Years	Team	Apps	(Gls)
2018	Deportes Quindío	10	(8)
2019	Cortuluá		
2020	Universitario		
2020–2021	Alajuelense	23	(8)
2021–2022	León	21	(3)
2022–2023	Pachuca	50	(12)
2024	Tijuana	30	(3)
2025–	Fenerbahçe	24	(13)

International career
2011–2012	Panama U17	9	(6)
2011–2012	Panama U20	6	(3)
2013–	Panama	63	(26)
- * Club domestic league appearances and goals

Marta Alexandra Cox Villarreal (born 20 July 1997) is a Panamanian professional football midfielder who plays for the Turkish Super League club Fenerbahçe, and Panama women's national team. She is nicknamed Keky.

== Personal life and early years ==
Marta Alexandra Cox Villarreal was born in El Chorrillo neighborhood of Panama City, Panama on 20 July 1997.

She started in football when she was only six years old at the local club Chorrillo FC. She was supported by her parents in her career. Her father kept supporting her also after her mother's death. At the age of 14, she debuted in the Panama national senior team.

== Club career ==
Cox is 1.64 m (5 ft 4 1/2 in) tall, and plays in the midfielder/striker position.

She played in her country for Universitario (formerly Chorrillo FC) in the Liga de Fútbol Femenino. She then went abroad, and was with the clubs Cortuluá in Colombia and Indiana in the United States.

=== Alajuelense ===
In the 2020–21 season, she was with Alajuelense in the Costa Rican Women's Premier Division. At the end of the season, she left the club for Mexico.

=== León ===
In July 2021, Cox signed with Club León. In doing so, she became the first foreign player to join the Liga MX Femenil team.

=== Pachuca ===
She played for Pachuca in the Liga MX Femenil, leaving the club at the end of 2023.

=== Tijuana ===
She transferred to Tijuana, and played in the first halof the 2024–25 Liga MX Femenil season.

=== Fenerbahçe ===
Mid January 2025, Cox moved to Turkey, and signed a one-and-half-year deal with the Istanbul-based club Fenerbahçe to start playing in the second half of the 2024-25 Super League season.

== International career ==
Cox was admitted to the Panama national senior team when she was 14 years old.

She made her debut with the senior national team in a UNCAF tournament in Guatemala on 20 May 2014 in a game where Panama lost 1-0 to Guatemala.

She took part at the 2019 FIFA Women's World Cup qualification.

== Honours ==
Fenerbahçe

- Turkish Super League: 2025–26

== Career statistics ==
Scores and results list Panama's goal tally first

No.	Date	Venue	Opponent	Score	Result	Competition
1.	22 May 2014	Estadio Mateo Flores, Guatemala City, Guatemala	Belize	4–1	13–1	2014 CONCACAF Women's Championship qualification
2.	22 May 2014	Estadio Mateo Flores, Guatemala City, Guatemala	Belize	5–1	13–1	2014 CONCACAF Women's Championship qualification
3.	22 May 2014	Estadio Mateo Flores, Guatemala City, Guatemala	Belize	8–1	13–1	2014 CONCACAF Women's Championship qualification
4.	22 May 2014	Estadio Mateo Flores, Guatemala City, Guatemala	Belize	11–1	13–1	2014 CONCACAF Women's Championship qualification
5.	14 December 2017	Estadio Independencia, Estelí, Nicaragua	Nicaragua	1–1	1–1	2017 Central American Games
6.	4 October 2018	WakeMed Soccer Park, Cary, United States	Trinidad and Tobago	1–0	3–0	2018 CONCACAF Women's Championship
7.	3 August 2019	Estadio Universidad San Marcos, Lima, Peru	Peru	1–0	1–1	2019 Pan American Games
8.	4 October 2019	Estadio Rommel Fernández, Panama City, Panama	Honduras	2–0	3–0	2020 CONCACAF Women's Olympic Qualifying Championship qualification
9.	8 October 2019	Estadio Rommel Fernández, Panama City, Panama	Guatemala	2–0	3–1	2020 CONCACAF Women's Olympic Qualifying Championship qualification
10.	19 February 2021	CAR de la Futefutbol, Guatemala City, Guatemala	Guatemala	1–3	1–3	Friendly
11.	20 February 2021	Estadio Pinula Contreras, Guatemala City, Guatemala	Guatemala	3–0	3–0	Friendly
12.	19 September 2021	Estadio Nacional de Costa Rica, San José, Costa Rica	Costa Rica	2–1	2–1	Friendly
13.	22 September 2021	Estadio Nacional de Costa Rica, San José, Costa Rica	Costa Rica	1–3	2–3	Friendly
14.	9 April 2022	FFB Stadium, Belmopan, Belize	Aruba	5–0	9–0	2022 CONCACAF W Championship qualification
15.	9 April 2022	FFB Stadium, Belmopan, Belize	Aruba	9–0	9–0	2022 CONCACAF W Championship qualification
16.	11 July 2022	Estadio Universitario, San Nicolás de los Garza, Mexico	Trinidad and Tobago	1–0	1–0	2022 CONCACAF W Championship
17.	11 October 2022	Estadio Rodrigo Paz Delgado, Quito, Ecuador	Ecuador	1–0	1–1	Friendly
18.	19 February 2023	North Harbour Stadium, Auckland, New Zealand	Papua New Guinea	1–0	2–0	2023 FIFA Women's World Cup qualification
19.	9 April 2023	Estadio Rommel Fernández, Panama City, Panama	Dominican Republic	1–0	4–3	Friendly
20.	26 June 2023	Victoria Stadium, Gibraltar	Gibraltar	5–0	7–0	Friendly
21.	2 August 2023	Sydney Football Stadium, Sydney, Australia	France	1–0	3–6	2023 FIFA Women's World Cup
22.	20 September 2023	Estadio Pensativo, Antigua, Guatemala	Guatemala	2–0	3–0	2024 CONCACAF W Gold Cup qualification
23.	29 November 2023	Independence Park, Kingston, Jamaica	Jamaica	1–0	1–1	2024 CONCACAF W Gold Cup qualification
24.	30 October 2024	Complejo Deportivo FCRF, Alajuela, Costa Rica	Costa Rica	1–0	2–0	Friendly
25.	29 May 2025	Estadio Rommel Fernández, Panama City, Panama	Bolivia	1–0	2–0	Friendly
26.	3 June 2025	Estadio Rommel Fernández, Panama City, Panama	Bolivia	4–0	5–1	Friendly

== See also ==
- List of Panama women's international footballers
