= Gökhan Bozkaya =

Turkish footballer

Personal information
- Full name: Gökhan Bozkaya
- Date of birth: 12 May 1981 (age 45)
- Place of birth: Germany
- Height: 1.78 m (5 ft 10 in)
- Position: Forward

Team information
- Current team: Fenerbahçe Women's (manager)

Senior career*
Years	Team	Apps	(Gls)
2000–2002	Fenerbahçe	7	(1)
2000–2001	→ Anadolu Üsküdar (loan)	?	(?)
2002–2003	Sivasspor	27	(9)
2003–2004	Antalyaspor	14	(5)
2004–2008	Sivasspor	63	(7)
2008	→ Eskişehirspor (loan)	11	(1)
2008–2009	Malatyaspor	6	(0)
2009–2010	Giresunspor	5	(0)
2010–2011	Kocaelispor	9	(0)
2011–2013	Kocaeli Birlik Spor	4	(0)

International career
2000	Turkey U19	4	(0)

Managerial career
- 2016–2019: Fenerbahçe U21 (assistant coach)
- 2019–2021: Fenerbahçe U19
- 2022–2023: Yeni Malatyaspor (assistant coach)
- 2023–: Fenerbahçe Women's
- * Club domestic league appearances and goals

Gökhan Bozkaya (born 12 May 1981 in Germany) is a Turkish football manager and former player.

Bozkaya previously made 50 appearances for Sivasspor in the Super Lig.

== Honors ==
=== Manager ===
Fenerbahçe

- Turkish Super League: 2025–26
