= İpek Kaya =

French-born Turkish footballer (born 1994)

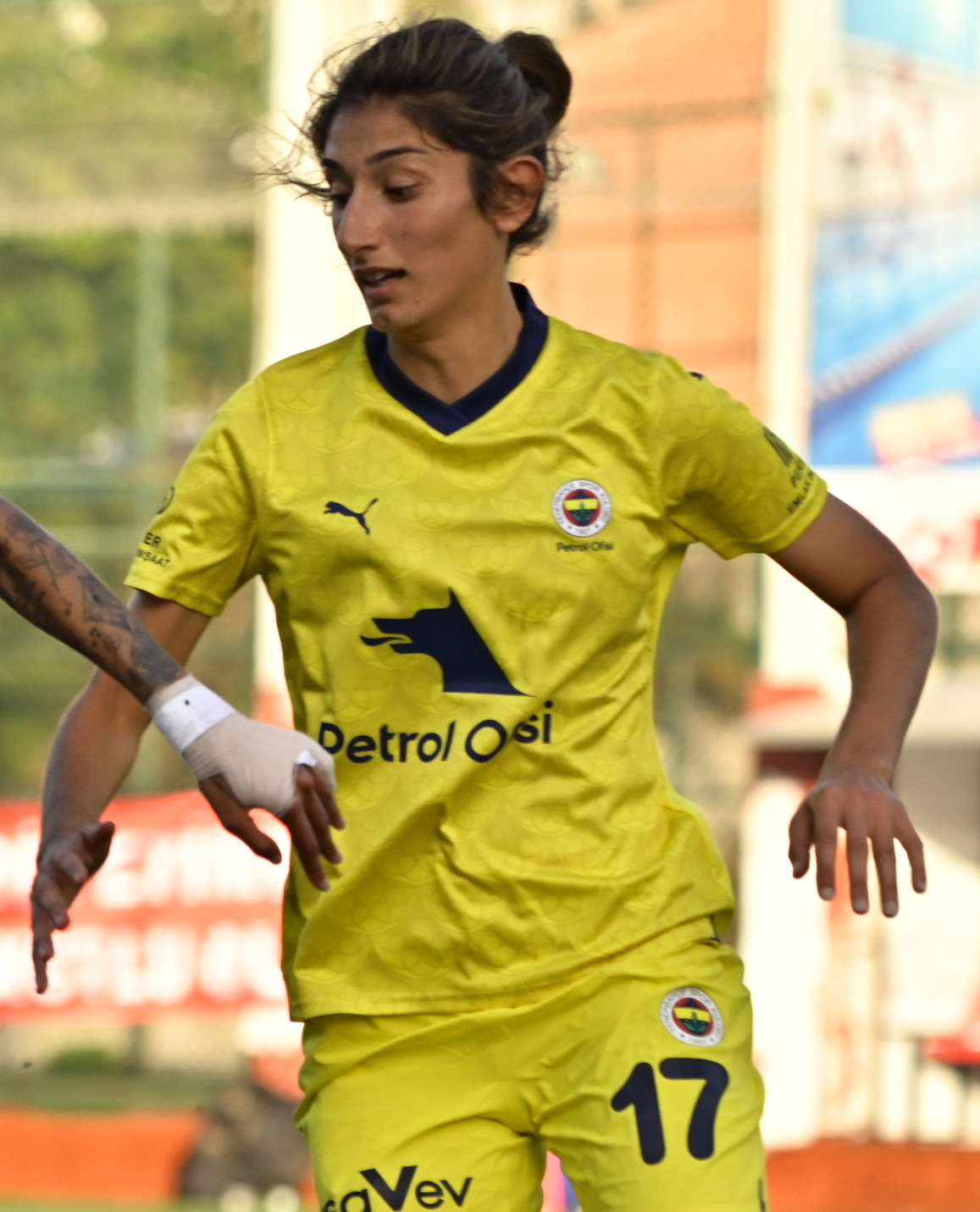
- Kaya with the Fenerbahçe

Personal information
- Date of birth: 28 October 1994 (age 32)
- Place of birth: L'Aigle, France
- Height: 1.75 m (5 ft 9 in)
- Position: Defender

Team information
- Current team: Fenerbahçe
- Number: 17

Youth career
- 2004–2010: FC du Pays Aiglon

Senior career*
Years	Team	Apps	(Gls)
2010–2015	Condé	86	(4)
2015–2016	Soyaux	2	(0)
2016–2017	Brestois 29	21	(1)
2017–2020	Metz	16	(3)
2020–2022	Brestois 29	0	(0)
2022–2023	Soyaux	17	(1)
2023–	Fenerbahçe	56	(4)

International career^{‡}
2013	France U19	2	(0)
2015–	Turkey	41	(0)
- * Club domestic league appearances and goals as of 22 December 2024 ‡ National team caps and goals as of 15 November 2022

İpek Kaya (born 28 October 1994) is a women's football defender who plays for Fenerbahçe and the Turkey national football team. Born in France, she represents Turkey at international level.

== Early years ==
She was born to Turkish immigrant parents in L'Aigle, Orne in France on 28 October 1994. She is a student of law.

== Club career ==
=== FCF Condé ===
She began her football career at her hometown club FC du Pays Aiglon in October 2004, where she was until June 2010. The next month, Kaya was transferred to FCF Condé, then competing in the French top women's league of Division 1 Féminine.

=== Soyaux ===
For the 2015–16 season, the defender signed for ASJ Soyaux-Charente, another club of Division 1 Féminine. She made her league debut against Guingamp on 13 December 2015.

=== First spell at Stade Brestois 29 ===
She then went to Stade Brestois 29, where she played the 2016–17 season.

=== FC Metz ===
Kaya transferred in the 2017–18 season to FC Metz, where she played three seasons and served as the captain.

=== Stade Brestois 29 ===
In June 2020, she returned to her former club Stade Brestois 29.

=== Second spell at Soyaux ===
Kaya made her league debut for the club against PSG on 9 September 2022. She scored her first league goal against Fleury on 1 October 2022, scoring in the 54th minute.

=== Fenerbahçe ===
On 4 August 2023, Kaya was announced at Fenerbahçe.

== Honours ==
Fenerbahçe

- Turkish Super League: 2025–26

== International career ==
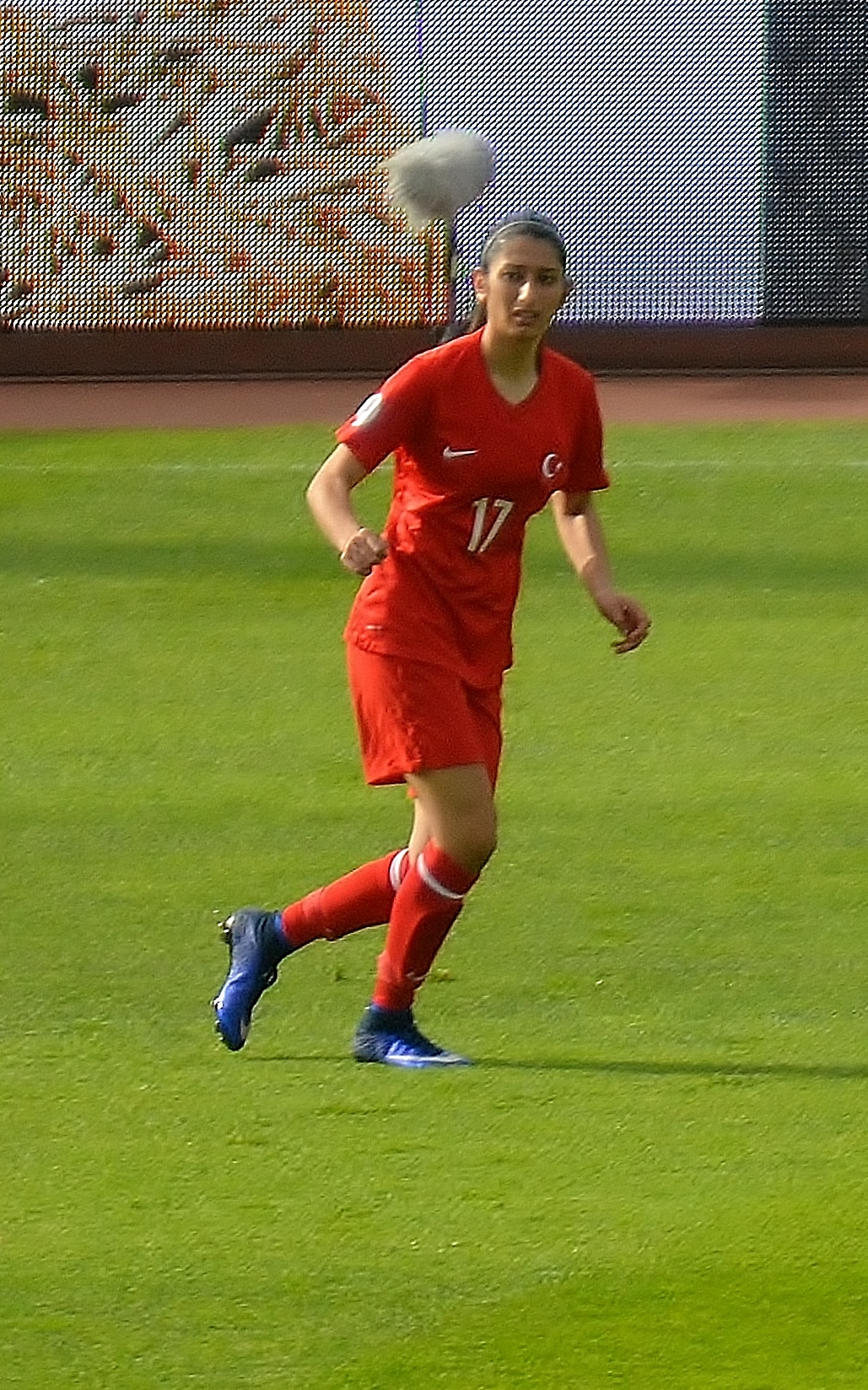
Kaya with the Turkey women's national team

İpek Kaya was selected twice to the France women's national under-19 football team. However, she switched to play for Turkey.

She debuted in the Turkey women's national team in the friendly match against Georgia on 24 February 2015. She took part at the UEFA Women's Euro 2017 qualifying Group 5 for Turkey. She played in three games of the 2019 FIFA Women's World Cup qualification – UEFA preliminary round – Group 4. She took part in five matches of the UEFA Women's Euro 2021 qualifying Group A.
