= Ece Türkoğlu =

Turkish women's footballer

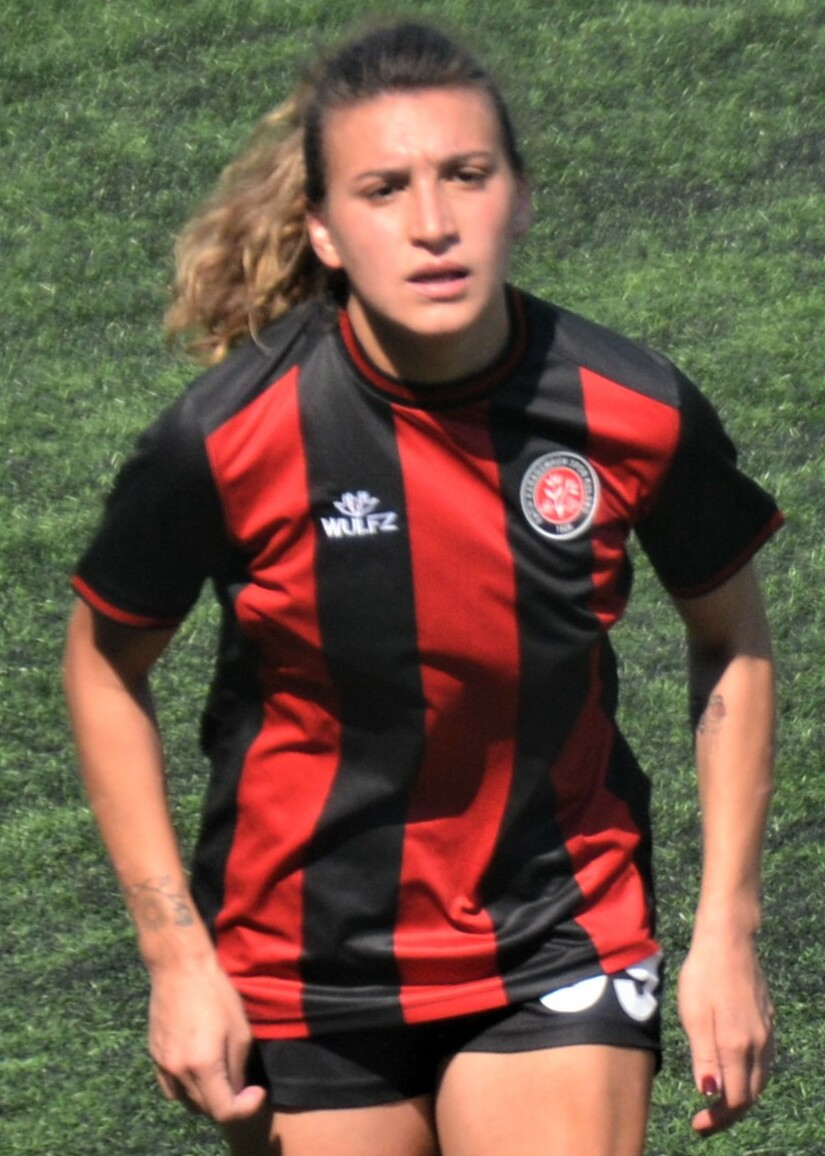
- Ece Türkoğlu for Fatih Karagümrük (May 2022).

Personal information
- Date of birth: 14 April 1999 (age 27)
- Place of birth: Karadeniz Ereğli, Turkey
- Position: Midfielder

Team information
- Current team: Fenerbahçe S.K.
- Number: 10

College career
| Years | Team | Apps | (Gls) |
| 2019–2023 | Old Dominion Monarchs | 85 | (13) |

Senior career*
| Years | Team | Apps | (Gls) |
| 2011–2017 | Kdz. Ereğli Belediye Spor | 76 | (25) |
| 2017–2018 | Ataşehir Belediyespor | 16 | (3) |
| 2018–2019 | Kdz. Ereğli Belediye Spor | 7 | (2) |
| 2022–2023 | Fatih Karagümrük | 12 | (2) |
| 2024– | Fenerbahçe | 55 | (17) |

International career^{‡}
| 2012–2013 | Turkey U-15 | 3 | (3) |
| 2014–2015 | Turkey U-17 | 21 | (5) |
| 2014–2016 | Turkey U-19 | 30 | (7) |
| 2016– | Turkey | 49 | (14) |
- * Club domestic league appearances and goals as of 4 May 2025 ‡ National team caps and goals as of 3 June 2025

Ece Türkoğlu (born 14 April 1999) is a Turkish women's football midfielder currently playing in the Turkish Women's Football Super League for Fenerbahçe S.K. She was part of the Turkey girls' national U-15, girls' national U-17 and women's national U-19 teams. She is a member of the Turkey women's national team.

== Early life ==
Ece Türkoğlu was born in İmranlar village of Karadeniz Ereğli in Zonguldak Province on 14 April 1999. She completed the primary school with honors in Çayırlı, and currently studies in Karadeniz Ereğli Science High School. Signed with Old Dominion University.

== Club career ==
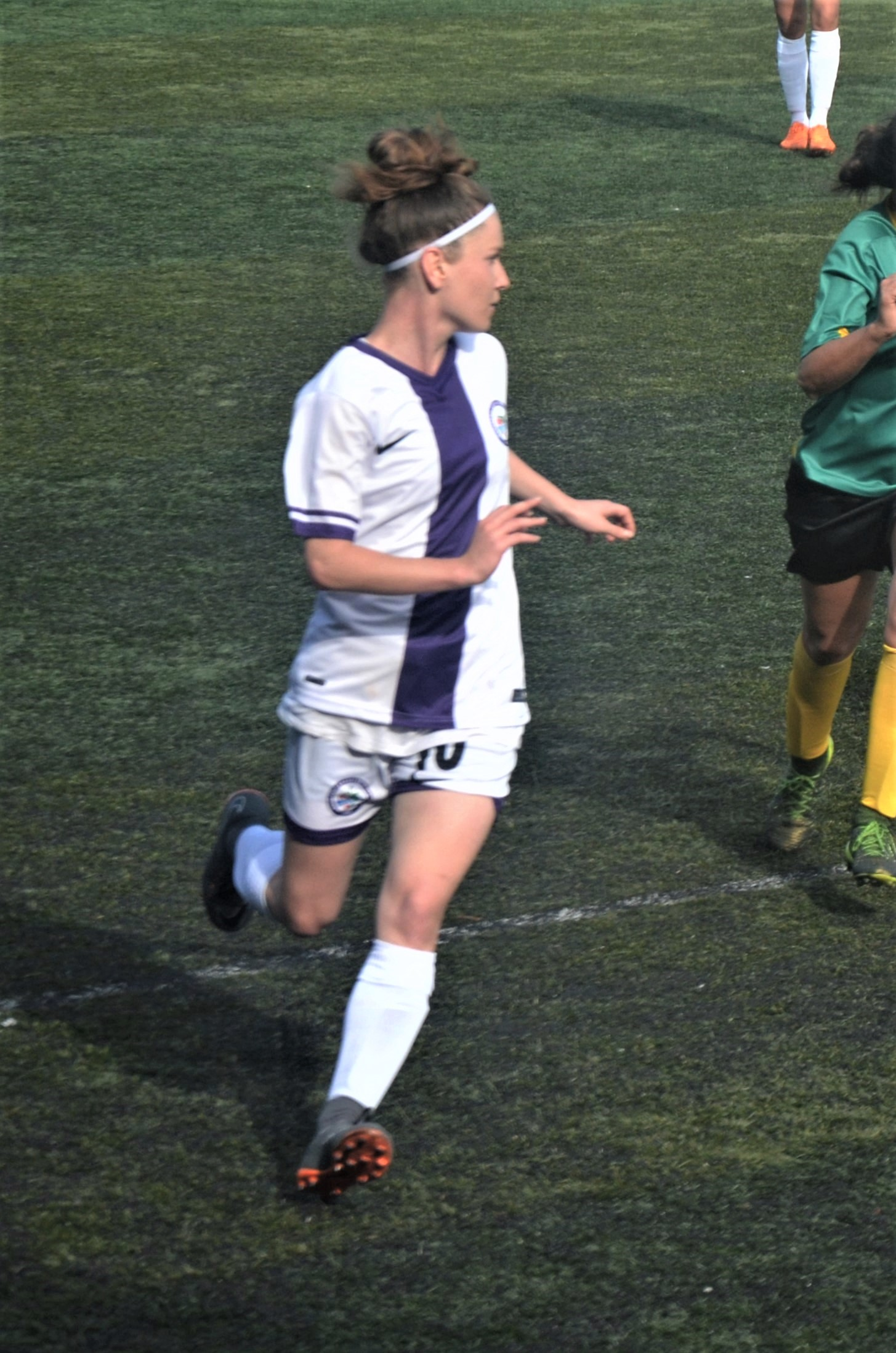
Ece Türkoğlu of Kdz. Ereğlispor in the 2018–19 Women's First League season.

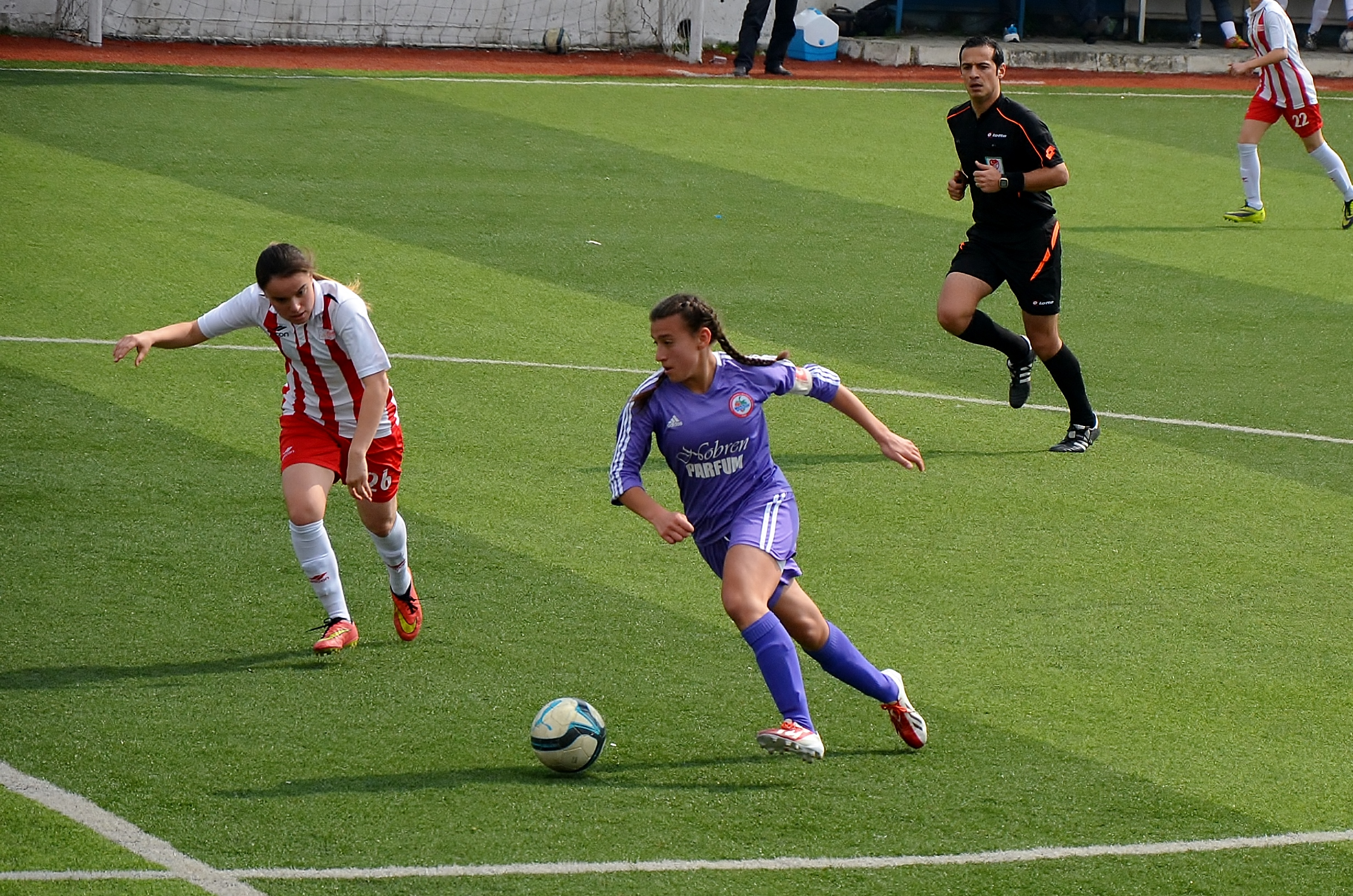
Ece Türkoğlu (lila) driving the ball in the 2014–15 season's away match against Ataşehir Belediyespor.

Ece Türkoğlu is a member of Kdz. Ereğlispor, for which she obtained her license on May 25, 2011. After appearing one season in the Women's First League with her team in the 2011–12 season, she played the next season in the Girls' U-15 Turkey Championship for her club's newly established youth team for girls, and enjoyed winning the title in September 2013. From the 2013–14 season on, she plays in the Women's First League again. Currently, she serves as the captain of her team.

Türkoğlu took part at the 2018–19 UEFA Women's Champions League qualifying round, and played in all three matches of the qualification round.

After one season with Ataşehir Belediyespor, she returned to her main club Kdz. Ereğlispor.

== International career ==
=== Turkey girls' U-15 ===
She debuted in the Turkey girls' national U-15 tram in the friendly match against Belarus on November 28, 2011, and netted a goal. She capped three times and scored three goals for the girls' national U-15 team.

=== Turkey girls' U-17 ===
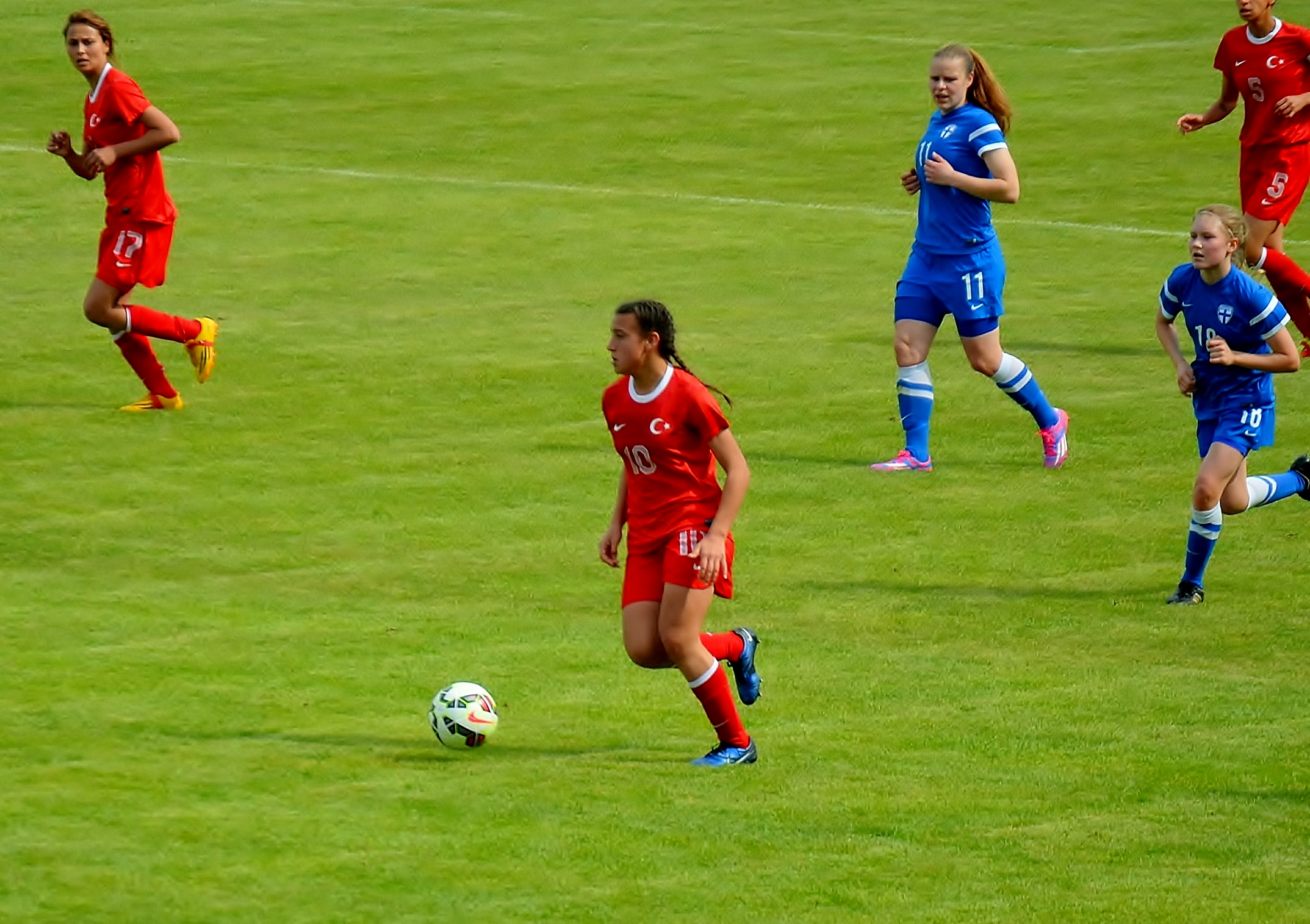
Ece Türkoğlu (red) in the Turkey women's national under-17 football team driving the ball at 2015 UEFA Women's Under-17 Championship qualification Elite round match against Finland.

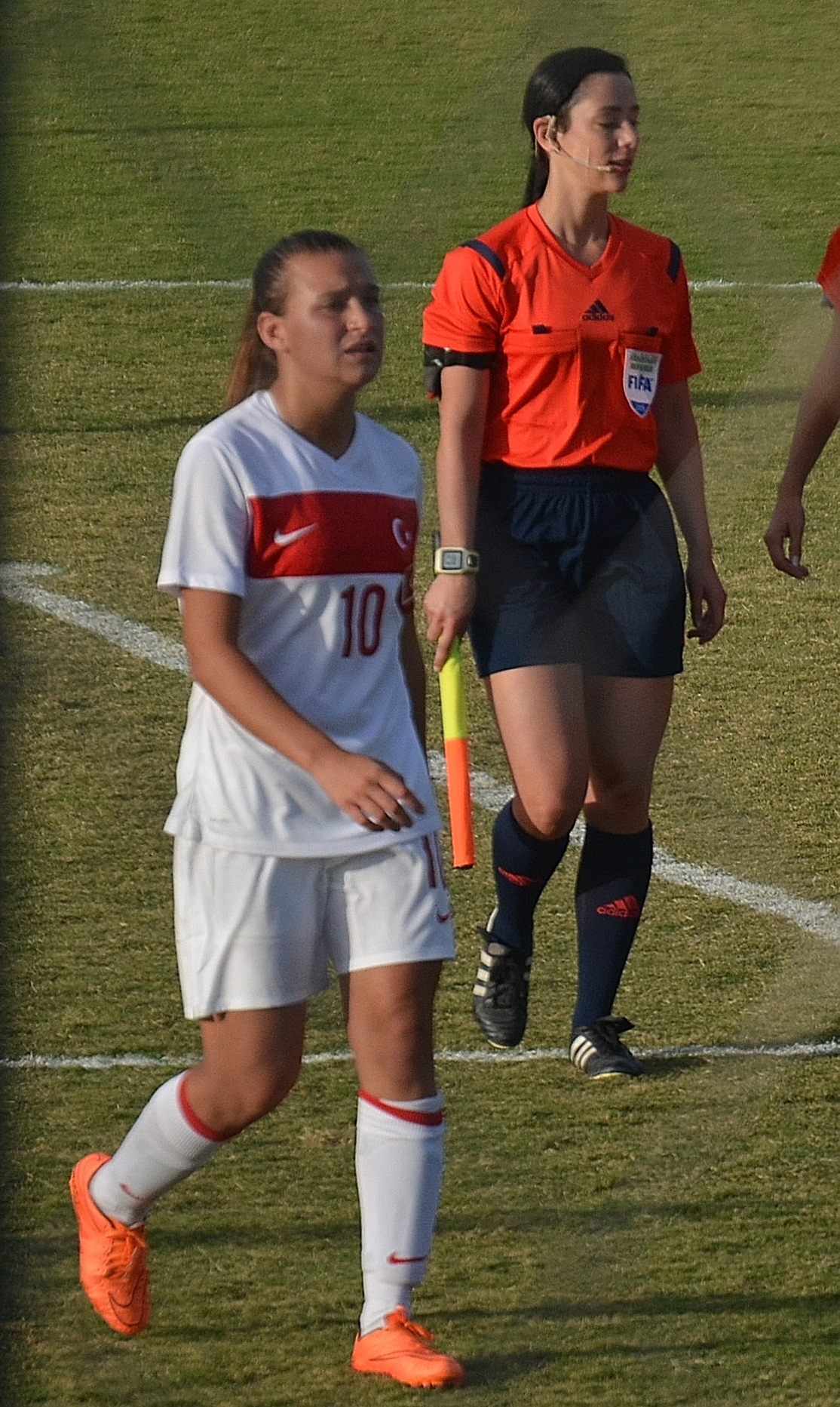
Ece Türkoğlu (white) in the Turkey women's national under-17 football team playing at 2016 UEFA Women's Under-17 Championship qualification match against Ireland.

Türkoğlu played in the Turkey girls' national U-17 team, and took part at the 2014 UEFA Women's Under-17 Development Tournament and 2015 UEFA Women's Under-17 Championship qualification – Group 8 matches. She appeared in 18 matches and netted five goals.

=== Turkey women's U-19 ===
She was part of the Turkey women's U-19 team, and played at the 2014 Kuban Spring Tournament. She was part of the team, which became champion of the 2016 UEFA Development Tournament. She took part at the 2017 UEFA Women's Under-19 Championship qualification – Group 10, 2018 UEFA Women's Under-19 Championship qualification – Group 10 and Elite round – Hroup 2 matches. She capped in 30 matches, and scored 7 goals for the national U-19 team.

=== Turkey women's ===
Türkoğlu debuted in the Turkey women's national team at the UEFA Women's Euro 2017 qualifying Group 5 match against Hungary and scored one goal. Further, she played in three matches of the GoldCity Woöem's Cup 2017 and in two matches of the 2019 FIFA Women's World Cup qualification – UEFA preliminary round. She scored one goal at the UEFA Women's Euro 2022 qualifying Group A, 2023 FIFA Women's World Cup qualification – UEFA Group H, and 2023–24 UEFA Women's Nations League C each.

International goals (Friendly matches not included)
| Date | Venue | Opponent | Competition | Result | Scored |
Turkey U-17
| August 13, 2014 | Tallinn, Estonia | UEFA Women's Under-17 Development Tournament | Azerbaijan | W 2–0 | 1 |
| October 16, 2014 | Strumica, Macedonia | 2015 UEFA Championship qualifying round – Group 8 | Kazakhstan | W 5–0 | 1 |
| May 5, 2015 | Shefayim, Israel | UEFA Women's Under-16 Development Tournament | Ukraine | W 2–1 | 2 |
Turkey women's U-19
| June 9, 2016 | Buftea, Romania | UEFA Women's Under-19 Development Tournament | Slovenia | W 8–0 | 1 |
| October 21, 2016 | Albena, Bulgaria | 2017 UEFA Women's Under-19 Championship qualification Group 10 | Bulgaria | W 3–0 | 1 |
| October 21, 2017 | Szombathely, Hungary | 2018 UEFA Women's Under-19 Championship qualification Group 10 | Armenia | W 5–0 | 3 |
Turkey
| June 6, 2016 | Antalya, Turkey | 2017 UEFA Championship qualifying round – Group 5 | Hungary | W 2–1 | 1 |
| November 27, 2020 | Tallinn, Estonia | UEFA Women's Euro 2022 qualifying Group A | Estonia | W 4–0 | 1 |
| April 7, 2022 | Plovdiv, Bulgaria | 2023 FIFA Women's World Cup qualification – UEFA Group H | Bulgaria | W 2–0 | 1 |
| December 5, 2023 | Mersin, Turkey | 2023–24 UEFA Women's Nations League C | Georgia | W 2–0 | 1 |

== Career statistics ==
As of 5 December 2023

| Club | Season | League | | | Continental | | National | | Total | |
| Club | Season | Division | Apps | Goals | Apps | Goals | Apps | Goals | Apps | Goals |
|---|---|---|---|---|---|---|---|---|---|---|
| Kdz. Ereğli Belediye Spor | 2011–12 | First League | 9 | 0 | – | – | 0 | 0 | 9 | 0 |
| Kdz. Ereğli Belediye Spor | 2012–13 | Girls' U-15 Championship | 2 | 0 | – | – | 1 | 1 | 3 | 1 |
| Kdz. Ereğli Belediye Spor | 2013–14 | First League | 17 | 2 | – | – | 15 | 3 | 32 | 5 |
| Kdz. Ereğli Belediye Spor | 2014–15 | First League | 11 | 4 | – | – | 13 | 4 | 24 | 8 |
| Kdz. Ereğli Belediye Spor | 2015–16 | First League | 15 | 9 | – | – | 9 | 2 | 24 | 11 |
| Kdz. Ereğli Belediye Spor | 2016–17 | First League | 22 | 10 | – | – | 8 | 1 | 30 | 11 |
| Kdz. Ereğli Belediye Spor | Total | | 76 | 25 | – | – | 46 | 11 | 122 | 36 |
| Ataşehir Belediyespor | 2017–18 | First League | 16 | 3 | – | – | 15 | 6 | 31 | 9 |
| Ataşehir Belediyespor | 2018–19 | First League | 0 | 0 | 3 | 0 | 0 | 3 | 3 | 3 |
| Ataşehir Belediyespor | Total | | 16 | 3 | 3 | 0 | 15 | 9 | 34 | 12 |
| Kdz. Ereğli Belediye Spor | 2018–19 | First League | 7 | 2 | – | – | 5 | 1 | 12 | 3 |
| Kdz. Ereğli Belediye Spor | 2020–21 | First League | 0 | 0 | – | – | 5 | 2 | 5 | 2 |
| Kdz. Ereğli Belediye Spor | Total | | 7 | 2 | – | – | 10 | 3 | 17 | 5 |
| Fatih Karagümrük | 2021–22 | Super League | 8 | 2 | – | – | 11 | 2 | 19 | 4 |
| Fatih Karagümrük | 2022–23 | Super League | 4 | 0 | – | – | 0 | 0 | 4 | 0 |
| Fatih Karagümrük | 2023–24 | Super League | 0 | 0 | – | – | 6 | 2 | 6 | 2 |
| Fatih Karagümrük | Total | | 12 | 2 | – | – | 17 | 4 | 29 | 6 |
| Career total | | | 111 | 32 | 3 | 0 | 88 | 27 | 202 | 59 |

== International goals ==
| No. | Date | Venue | Opponent | Score | Result | Competition |
|---|---|---|---|---|---|---|
| 1. | 6 June 2016 | Akdeniz University Stadium, Antalya, Turkey | Hungary | 1–0 | 2–1 | UEFA Women's Euro 2017 qualifying |
| 2. | 22 January 2019 | Arslan Zeki Demirci Sports Complex, Antalya, Turkey | Slovakia | 1–1 | 1–1 | Friendly |
| 3. | 27 November 2020 | Sportsland, Tallinn, Estonia | Estonia | 1–0 | 4–0 | UEFA Women's Euro 2022 qualifying |
| 4. | 15 July 2021 | Selman Stërmasi Stadium, Tirana, Albania | Albania | 2–1 | 4–1 | Friendly |
| 5. | 7 April 2022 | Plovdiv Stadium, Plovdiv, Bulgaria | Bulgaria | 1–0 | 2–0 | 2023 FIFA Women's World Cup qualification |
| 6. | 25 June 2022 | TFF Riva Facility, Istanbul, Turkey | Azerbaijan | 1–0 | 2–0 | Friendly |
| 7. | 17 July 2023 | Kadriorg Stadium, Tallinn, Estonia | Estonia | 1–0 | 2–2 | Friendly |
| 8. | 5 December 2023 | Mersin Stadium, Mersin, Turkey | Georgia | 2–0 | 2–0 | 2023–24 UEFA Women's Nations League |
| 9. | 5 April 2024 | Letzigrund, Zürich, Switzerland | Switzerland | 1–3 | 1–3 | UEFA Women's Euro 2025 qualifying |
| 10. | 9 April 2024 | Pendik Stadyumu, Istanbul, Turkey | Hungary | 1–1 | 2–1 | UEFA Women's Euro 2025 qualifying |
| 11. | 7 March 2026 | Mourneview Park, Lurgan, Northern Ireland | Northern Ireland | 1–0 | 1–0 | 2027 FIFA Women's World Cup qualification |
| 12. | 9 June 2026 | Centenary Stadium, Ta' Qali, Malta | Malta | 2–0 | 3–0 | 2027 FIFA Women's World Cup qualification |

== Honors ==
=== Club ===
Turkish Women's First League

Kdz. Ereğlispor
Third places (1): 2012–13

Ataşehir Belediyespor
Winners (1): 2017–18

Turkish Women's Super League

Fatih Karagümrük
Runners-up (1): 2021–22

Fenerbahçe
Winners (1): 2025–26

=== International ===
UEFA Development Tournament

Turkey women's U-19
Winners (1): 2016
