= 2022–23 Fenerbahçe S.K. (women's football) season =

Fenerbahçe
2022–23 season
- President: Ali Koç
- Head coach: Özkan Beceren (until 28 January 2023); Serhat Deniz (caretaker, from 28 January 2023)
- Stadium: Beylerbeyi 75. Yıl Stadium
- Turkish Women's Football Super League: Group B, 3rd
- Play-offs: Runners-up
- Top goalscorer: League: Busem Şeker (13); All: Busem Şeker (13)
Home colours	Away colours	Third colours

The 2022–23 season was the 2nd season in the existence of Fenerbahçe S.K. women's football team and the club's second consecutive season in the top flight of Turkish football.

== Kits ==
- Supplier: Puma
- Main sponsor: Petrol Ofisi

- Back sponsor: —
- Sleeve sponsor: —

- Short sponsor: —
- Socks sponsor: —

Home

Away

Third

Home alt.

Goalkeeper 1

Goalkeeper 2

Goalkeeper 3

== Squad ==
As of 28 February 2023

Note: Flags indicate national team as defined under FIFA eligibility rules; some limited exceptions apply. Players may hold more than one non-FIFA nationality.

No.	Pos.	Nation	Player
1	GK	TUR	Ezgi Çağlar
21	GK	AZE	Göknur Güleryüz
25	GK	TUR	Zeynep Akdeniz
3	DF	TUR	İlayda Cansu Kara
4	DF	TUR	Yaşam Göksu
5	DF	TUR	Narin Yakut
14	DF	MLI	Fatou Dembele
15	DF	TUR	Sevinç Çorlu
17	DF	TUR	Emine Yaren Çolak
24	DF	AZE	Nazlıcan Parlak
30	DF	CIV	Zote Nina Kpaho
6	MF	TUR	Meryem Cennet Çal
9	MF	TUR	Busem Şeker

No.	Pos.	Nation	Player
10	MF	TUR	Fatma Kara Şahinbaş
18	MF	GHA	Alice Kusi
20	MF	TUR	Altun Sancar
22	MF	TUR	Ecem Cumert
23	MF	TUR	Zeynep Ülkü Kahya
26	MF	TUR	Cansu Gürel
29	MF	CMR	Genevieve Ngo Mbeleck
34	MF	GHA	Faustina Adjei Kyeremeh
7	FW	TUR	Setenay Sırım
8	FW	NAM	Zenatha Goeieman Coleman
13	FW	TUR	Zeynep Kerimoğlu
19	FW	TTO	Kennya Kinda Esther Cordner
27	FW	PUR	Danielle Julia Marcano

== Transfers ==
=== In ===
No.	Pos.	Nat.	Player	Moving from	Type	Source
Summer
6	MF	(Turkey)	Meryem Cennet Çal	(Switzerland) BSC YB Frauen	Transfer	
13	FW	(Turkey)	Zeynep Kerimoğlu	Beşiktaş	Transfer	
22	MF	(Turkey)	Ecem Cumert	ALG Spor	Transfer	
9	MF	(Turkey)	Busem Şeker	Konak Belediyespor	Transfer	
26	MF	(Turkey)	Cansu Gürel	Konak Belediyespor	Transfer	
4	DF	(Turkey)	Yaşam Göksu	Konak Belediyespor	Transfer	
11	MF	(Nigeria)	Patricia George	(Germany) SC Sand	Transfer	
21	GK	(Azerbaijan)	Göknur Güleryüz	Trabzonspor	Transfer	
24	DF	(Azerbaijan)	Nazlıcan Parlak	Konak Belediyespor	Transfer	
2	MF	(United States)	Kristen Leigh Ricks	(Cyprus) Apollon Limassol	Transfer	
27	FW	(Puerto Rico)	Danielle Marcano	(Iceland) Knattspyrnufélagið Þróttur	Transfer	
Winter
14	DF	(Mali)	Fatou Dembele	(Morocco) Ittihad Riadi de Tanger	Transfer	
34	MF	(Ghana)	Faustina Adjei Kyeremeh	(Armenia) FC Hayasa	Transfer	
18	MF	(Ghana)	Alice Kusi	(Serbia) Spartak Subotica	Transfer	
29	MF	(Cameroon)	Genevieve Ngo Mbeleck	(Israel) Maccabi Kishronot Hadera	Transfer	

=== Out ===
No.	Pos.	Nat.	Player	Moving to	Type	Source
Summer
21	FW	(England)	Shameeka Fishley	(Hungary) Ferencvárosi	Transfer	
15	MF	(United States)	Erin Yenney		Transfer	
27	MF	(Portugal)	Mariana Jaleca	(Czech Republic) Sparta Prague	Transfer	
20	MF	(Turkey)	Dilan Aslan	Kdz. Ereğli	Transfer	
36	MF	(Turkey)	Dilan Bora	(Scotland) Glasgow City	Transfer	
4	DF	(Turkey)	Demet Bozkurt	Retired		
16	MF	(Turkey)	Neslihan Aktaş		Transfer	
3	DF	(Azerbaijan)	Beyzanur Aslan		Transfer	
80	MF	(Turkey)	Berdan Bozkurt	Pendik Çamlıkspor	Transfer	
6	DF	(Turkey)	Jessica Çarmıklı	Retired		
18	MF	(Turkey)	Songül Demirtürk	Fatih Karagümrük	Transfer	
98	GK	(Turkey)	Zuhal Ezer	Pendik Çamlıkspor	Transfer	
28	DF	(Turkey)	Rabia Göksu Gökçe	Pendik Çamlıkspor	Transfer	
2	DF	(Turkey)	Safa Merve Nalçacı	Pendik Çamlıkspor	Transfer	
Winter
2	MF	(United States)	Kristen Leigh Ricks		Transfer	
11	MF	(Nigeria)	Patricia George		Transfer	

=== Contract renewals ===
No.	Pos.	Nat.	Name	Date	Until	Source
10	MF	(Turkey)	Fatma Kara Şahinbaş	23 June 2022	30 June 2023	
1	GK	(Turkey)	Ezgi Çağlar	23 June 2022	30 June 2023	
20	MF	(Turkey)	Altun Sancar	23 June 2022	30 June 2023	
5	DF	(Turkey)	Narin Yakut	23 June 2022	30 June 2023	
7	FW	(Turkey)	Setenay Sırım	23 June 2022	30 June 2023	
3	DF	(Turkey)	İlayda Cansu Kara	23 June 2022	30 June 2023	
23	MF	(Turkey)	Zeynep Ülkü Kahya	23 June 2022	30 June 2023	
25	GK	(Turkey)	Zeynep Akdeniz	23 June 2022	30 June 2023	
30	DF	(Ivory Coast)	Nina Kpaho	23 June 2022	30 June 2023	
19	FW	(Trinidad and Tobago)	Kennya Cordner	23 June 2022	30 June 2023	
8	FW	(Namibia)	Zenatha Coleman	23 June 2022	30 June 2023	
15	DF	(Turkey)	Sevinç Çorlu	27 June 2022	30 June 2023	
17	DF	(Turkey)	Emine Yaren Çolak	5 August 2022	30 June 2023	
98	GK	(Turkey)	Zuhal Ezer	9 September 2022	30 June 2023	

== Technical staff ==
As of 3 March 2023

Position	Staff
General Manager	(Turkey) Eren Şenyaprak
Head Coach	(Turkey) Serhat Deniz
Assistant Coach	(Turkey) Barış Filiz
Goalkeeping Coach	(Turkey) Ümit Furat
Athletic Performance Coach	(Turkey) Samet Kösemen

== Pre-season ==
Win Draw Loss Fixtures

14 September 2022	Fenerbahçe (Turkey)	2–0	(Turkey) Kdz. Ereğli Belediye Spor	Istanbul
	Kpaho 74'; Cordner 88'	Report		Stadium: Dereağzı Lefter Küçükandonyadis Facilities

17 September 2022	Fenerbahçe (Turkey)	3–1	(Turkey) Fatih Vatan	Istanbul
		Report		Stadium: Dereağzı Lefter Küçükandonyadis Facilities

25 September 2022	Fenerbahçe (Turkey)	9–0	(Turkey) Ataşehir Belediyespor

29 September 2022	Fenerbahçe (Turkey)	7–0	(Turkey) Beylerbeyi Spor A.Ş. Pendik Çamlıkspor

4 October 2022	Fenerbahçe (Turkey)	3–1	Nigeria Women's U17	Istanbul
12:00 TRT (UTC+3)	Şeker; Şahinbaş	Report		Stadium: Dereağzı Lefter Küçükandonyadis Facilities

25 February 2023	Fenerbahçe (Turkey)	12–1	(Turkey) Bağcılar Evrenspor	Istanbul
		Report		Stadium: Dereağzı Lefter Küçükandonyadis Facilities

== Competitions ==
=== Overall record ===
Competition	First match	Last match	Starting round	Final position	Record							
Competition	First match	Last match	Starting round	Final position	Pld	W	D	L	GF	GA	GD	Win %
Super League	16 October 2022	18 March 2023	Matchday 1	3rd	18	11	3	4	66	10	+56	61.11
Super League Play-offs	25 April 2023	2 June 2023	First round	Runners-up	7	4	2	1	14	7	+7	57.14
Total					25	15	5	5	80	17	+63	60.00

Source: FootyStats

=== Turkish Women's Football Super League ===
==== League table (Group B) ====
Pos	Team	Pld	W	D	L	GF	GA	GD	Pts	Qualification or relegation
1	Galatasaray	18	17	0	1	84	9	+75	51	Quarterfinals
2	Ankara BB FOMGET (C)	18	16	1	1	65	11	+54	49	First round
3	Fenerbahçe	18	11	3	4	66	10	+56	36	First round
4	Amed	18	8	4	6	31	22	+9	28	First round
5	1207 Antalyaspor	18	7	4	7	32	25	+7	25	First round
6	Ataşehir Bld.	18	6	3	9	35	51	−16	21	First round
7	Konak Bld.	18	6	2	10	32	39	−7	20	First round
8	Trabzonspor (O)	18	5	2	11	27	29	−2	17	Play-out
9	Adana İdmanyurdu (Note: Adana İdmanyurdu withdrew from the league, following the 2023 Turkey–Syria earthquake, and were not relegated at the end of the season.)	18	4	1	13	20	37	−17	13	
10	Kireçburnu (Note: Kireçburnu had 3 points deducted.) (R)	18	0	0	18	8	167	−159	−3	Play-out

Source: TFF.org
(C) Champions; (O) Play-out winner; (R) Relegated

==== Results summary ====
Overall								Home						Away					
Pld	W	D	L	GF	GA	GD	Pts	W	D	L	GF	GA	GD	W	D	L	GF	GA	GD
18	11	3	4	66	10	+56	36	7	1	1	47	4	+43	4	2	3	19	6	+13

Source: Competitive matches

==== Results by round ====
Round	1	2	3	4	5	6	7	8	9	10	11	12	13	14	15	16	17	18
Ground	A	H	A	H	A	H	H	A	H	H	A	H	A	H	A	A	H	A
Result	W	L	W	W	W	W	D	L	W	W	L	W	D	W	W	L	W	D
Position	1	5	3	3	3	3	3	3	3	3	3	3	3	3	3	3	3	3

Source: Competitive matches
A = Away; H = Home; W = Win; D = Draw; L = Loss

==== Matches ====
16 October 2022 1	Adana İdman Yurdu	0–4	Fenerbahçe	Adana
12:30 TRT (UTC+3)	Şengül (yellow card) 65'; Peka (yellow card) 76'	Report	Şahinbaş 8', 56' (pen.); Şeker 23'; Cordner 40'	Stadium: Muharrem Gülergin Stadium; Referee: Sevgi Ölez Şen

22 October 2022 2	Fenerbahçe	2–3	Galatasaray	Istanbul
15:00 TRT (UTC+3)	Cordner 25'; Şeker (yellow card) 45+1'; Coleman 49'; Çal (yellow card) 72'	Report	Denda (yellow card) 12' (goal) 45+2'; Demir (yellow card) 27'; Uraz 84'; Topçu 90'; Bakarandze (yellow card) 90+1'	Stadium: Beylerbeyi 75. Yıl Stadium; Referee: Muhammed Ömür

29 October 2022 3	Konak Belediyespor	0–3	Fenerbahçe	İzmir
12:00 TRT (UTC+3)	İşçi (yellow card) 72'; Álvarez (yellow card) 77'	Report	Şahinbaş 45+4'; Marcano 65'; İ. Kara 83'	Attendance: Atatürk 1 Nolu Yan Saha; Referee: Damla Tarkan

6 November 2022 4	Fenerbahçe	5–0	1207 Antalya	Istanbul
12:00 TRT (UTC+3)	Coleman 10'; Cordner 26', 86'; Marcano 47'; Şeker 70'; Cumert (yellow card) 85'	Report		Stadium: Beylerbeyi 75. Yıl Stadium; Referee: Denizhan Aydın

20 November 2022 5	Kireçburnu	1–5	Fenerbahçe	Istanbul
12:00 TRT (UTC+3)	Mahfoudh (yellow card) 61'; Çetinkaya (yellow card) 86' (goal) 90+1'	Report	Cumert 5', 10', 44'; Coleman 27', 53'; Marcano (yellow card) 48'; Parlak (yellow card) 56'	Stadium: Çayırbaşı Stadium; Referee: Atakan Kozik

26 November 2022 6	Fenerbahçe	7–0	Ataşehir Belediyespor	Istanbul
14:00 TRT (UTC+3)	Şeker 5'; Marcano 10'; Cordner 16', 25', 40'; Parlak 21', 24'; Çolak (yellow card) 77'	Report	Subay (yellow card) 41'; Taşkın (yellow card) 66'	Stadium: Beylerbeyi 75. Yıl Stadium; Referee: Emine Öz

3 December 2022 7	Fenerbahçe	1–1	Ankara BB Fomget	Istanbul
15:00 TRT (UTC+3)	Cumert (yellow card) 38'; Şeker 50'	Report	Shmatko 22'; Apanashchenko (yellow card) 31'; Ahmadova (yellow card) 38'; Ovdiychuk (yellow card) 52'	Stadium: Beylerbeyi 75. Yıl Stadium; Referee: Melih Aldmemir

11 December 2022 8	Amed	1–0	Fenerbahçe	Diyarbakır
12:00 TRT (UTC+3)	Bakradze 89'	Report	Kpaho (yellow card) 20'	Stadium: Amedspor Facilities; Referee: Murat Ercan

17 December 2022 9	Fenerbahçe	1–0	Trabzonspor	Istanbul
12:00 TRT (UTC+3)	Cumert 23'	Report	Grace (yellow card) 41'; Tatuashvili (yellow card) 41'	Stadium: Beylerbeyi 75. Yıl Stadium; Referee: Elif Köroğlu

8 January 2023 10	Fenerbahçe	1–0	Adana İdman Yurdu	Istanbul
12:00 TRT (UTC+3)	Parlak 29'	Report		Stadium: Beylerbeyi 75. Yıl Stadium; Referee: Erhan Sargın

15 January 2023 11	Galatasaray	2–0	Fenerbahçe	Istanbul
15:00 TRT (UTC+3)	Uraz 45+3'; Topçu 62'; Yeniçeri (yellow card) 7'; Jiayue (yellow card) 28'; Civelek (yellow card) 20'; Esen (yellow card) 69'; Denda (yellow card) 86'; Santos (yellow card) 90+1'; Kurğa (yellow card) 90+5'	Report		Referee: Oğuzhan Talka Karakuş

18 January 2023 12	Fenerbahçe	8–0	Konak Belediyespor	Istanbul
12:00 TRT (UTC+3)	Coleman 6', 48', 74' (yellow card) 71'; Şeker 21', 50'; Çal (yellow card) 52'; Cumert 56'; İ. Kara 79'; Parlak 82'	Report	Emenayo (yellow card) 32'; Ayangma (yellow card) 34'; Álvarez (yellow card) 38'; Camacho (yellow card) 88'	Stadium: Beylerbeyi 75. Yıl Stadium; Referee: Sema Süer

2 January 2023 13	1207 Antalya	1–1	Fenerbahçe	Antalya
12:00 TRT (UTC+3)	Opoku (yellow card) 49'; Khavanska 76'; Amankrah (yellow card) 90'	Report	Kyeremeh 58'; Dembele (yellow card) 75'; İ. Kara (yellow card) 85'	Stadium: Zeytinköy Stadium; Referee: Murat Türker Aksu

28 January 2023 14	Fenerbahçe	18–0	Kireçburnu	Istanbul
14:00 TRT (UTC+3)	Şeker 3', 23', 62', 67'; Göksu 7', 31', 44'; Kyeremeh 8', 21'; Parlak 12'; Çal 36'; Kahya 40'; Sırım 64', 70', 85', 87'; İ. Kara 76'; Cumert 78'	Report		Stadium: Beylerbeyi 75. Yıl Stadium; Referee: Soner Koncagül

5 February 2023 15	Ataşehir Belediyespor	0–6	Fenerbahçe	Istanbul
12:00 TRT (UTC+3)	Adu (yellow card) 30'; Çelebi (yellow card) 64'	Report	Cumert (yellow card) 27'; Şeker 31' (pen.), 37', 40'; Marcano 45'; Göksu 50', 67'	Stadium: İBB Esatpaşa Stadium; Referee: Burhan Öztürk

5 March 2022 16	Ankara BB Fomget	1–0	Fenerbahçe	Istanbul
14:00 TRT (UTC+3)	Shevchuk 14'; Apanashchenko (yellow card) 16'; Ahmadova (yellow card) 31'; Yıldırım (yellow card) 77'; Altıntaş (red card) 80'; İçinözbebek (yellow card) 88'	Report	Şeker (red card) 80'	Referee: Kübra Çetinkaya

12 March 2022 17	Fenerbahçe	4–0	Amed	Istanbul
12:00 TRT (UTC+3)	Coleman 32' (yellow card) 45+2'; Cordner 58', 69'; Kusi 84'; Çal (yellow card) 87'; Cumert (yellow card) 90'	Report	Çavur (yellow card) 14'	Stadium: Beylerbeyi 75. Yıl Stadium; Referee: Ceyhun Elmas

18 March 2022 18	Trabzonspor	0–0	Fenerbahçe	Trabzon
13:00 TRT (UTC+3)	Şentürk (yellow card) 40'; Yazıcı (yellow card) 90+4'	Report		Stadium: Ahmet Suat Özyazıcı Stadium; Referee: Murat Demir

==== Play-offs ====
===== First round =====
25 April 2023 First leg	Hatayspor	0–3 (w/o)	Fenerbahçe	Hatay
12:00 TRT (UTC+3)		Report
Note: Hatayspor withdrew from the league due to the 2023 Turkey–Syria earthquake and Fenerbahçe, therefore, were awarded a 3–0 win.

29 April 2023 Second leg	Fenerbahçe	3–0 (w/o) (6–0 agg.)	Hatayspor	Istanbul
12:00 TRT (UTC+3)		Report		Stadium: Beylerbeyi 75. Yıl Stadium
Note: Hatayspor withdrew from the league due to the 2023 Turkey–Syria earthquake and Fenerbahçe, therefore, were awarded a 3–0 win.

===== Quarter-finals =====
3 May 2023 First leg	Fenerbahçe	1–0	Fatih Karagümrük	Istanbul
15:00 TRT (UTC+3)	Kusi (yellow card) 31', (goal) 67'; Coleman (yellow card) 48'; Cumert (yellow card) 61'	Report	Traoré (yellow card) 41'; Rouamba (yellow card) 77'	Stadium: Beylerbeyi 75. Yıl Stadium; Referee: Mustafa Gökhan Keskin

7 May 2023 Second leg	Fatih Karagümrük	1–1 (1–2 agg.)	Fenerbahçe	Istanbul
15:00 TRT (UTC+3)	Kıvanç (yellow card) 10'; Yektaei (red card) 28'; Chilufya 51'; Akaffou (yellow card) 80'	Report	Göksu (yellow card) 31'; Coleman 38'; Şahinbaş (yellow card) 75'; Marcano (yellow card) 77'; Dembele (yellow card) 90+7'	Stadium: Vefa Stadium; Referee: Mete Aylıoğlu

===== Semi-finals =====
13 May 2023 First leg	Fenerbahçe	2–0	Galatasaray	Istanbul
15:00 TRT (UTC+3)	Marcano 2'; Kusi 62'	Report	Civelek (yellow card) 60'; Bakarandze (yellow card) 89'	Stadium: Dereağzı Lefter Küçükandonyadis Facilities; Referee: Melis Özçiğdem

20 May 2023 Second leg	Galatasaray	2–2 (2–4 agg.)	Fenerbahçe	Istanbul
12:00 TRT (UTC+3)	Sadıkoğlu (yellow card) 45+1'; Topçu 56' (pen.); Yeniçeri (yellow card) 67'; Yeniçeri 84'; Santos (yellow card) 90+3'; Jiayue (yellow card) '"'UNIQ--templatestyles-0000016E-QINU'"'EOM'	Report	Marcano 1'; Coleman (yellow card) 37', (goal) 90+3' (pen.); Çal (yellow card) 90+2'	Stadium: Florya Metin Oktay Facilities; Referee: Gamze Durmuş Pakkan

===== Final =====
2 June 2023	Ankara BB Fomget	4–2 (a.e.t.)	Fenerbahçe	İzmir
20:00 TRT (UTC+3)	Apanashchenko 90+8' (pen.); Kuč 96', 107', 114'; Shmatko (yellow card) 109'; Yıldırım (yellow card) 119'	Report	Coleman 9' (pen.), 109'; Cordner (yellow card) 36'; Cumert (yellow card) 90+3' (yellow-red card) 95'; Kpaho (yellow card) 113'	Stadium: Alsancak Mustafa Denizli Stadium; Referee: Cansu Tiryaki

== Statistics ==
=== Appearances and goals ===
No.	Pos.	Player	Süper Lig		Total	
No.	Pos.	Player	Apps	Goals	Apps	Goals
1	GK	(Turkey) Ezgi Çağlar	11	0	11	0
3	DF	(Turkey) İlayda Cansu Kara	18	3	18	3
4	DF	(Turkey) Yaşam Göksu	19	5	19	5
5	DF	(Turkey) Narin Yakut	9	0	9	0
6	MF	(Turkey) Meryem Cennet Çal	21	1	21	1
7	FW	(Turkey) Setenay Sırım	11	4	11	4
8	FW	(Namibia) Zenatha Coleman	19	12	19	12
9	MF	(Turkey) Busem Şeker	18	13	18	13
10	MF	(Turkey) Fatma Kara Şahinbaş	16	3	16	3
13	FW	(Turkey) Zeynep Kerimoğlu	5	0	5	0
14	DF	(Mali) Fatou Dembele	8	0	8	0
15	DF	(Turkey) Sevinç Çorlu	7	0	7	0
17	DF	(Turkey) Emine Yaren Çolak	6	0	6	0
18	MF	(Ghana) Alice Kusi	8	3	8	3
19	FW	(Trinidad and Tobago) Kennya Cordner	16	9	16	9
20	MF	(Turkey) Altun Sancar	2	0	2	0
21	GK	(Azerbaijan) Göknur Güleryüz	13	0	13	0
22	MF	(Turkey) Ecem Cumert	21	6	21	6
23	MF	(Turkey) Zeynep Ülkü Kahya	5	1	5	1
24	DF	(Azerbaijan) Nazlıcan Parlak	20	5	20	5
25	GK	(Turkey) Zeynep Akdeniz	3	0	3	0
26	MF	(Turkey) Cansu Gürel	19	0	19	0
27	FW	(Puerto Rico) Danielle Marcano	19	6	19	6
29	MF	(Cameroon) Genevieve Ngo Mbeleck	3	0	3	0
30	DF	(Ivory Coast) Nina Kpaho	18	0	18	0
34	MF	(Ghana) Faustina Adjei Kyeremeh	13	3	13	3
Players transferred/loaned out during the season
2	MF	(United States) Kristen Leigh Ricks	8	0	8	0
11	MF	(Nigeria) Patricia George	1	0	1	0

=== Goalscorers ===
Rank	No.	Pos.	Player	Süper Lig	Total
1	9	MF	(Turkey) Busem Şeker	13	13
2	8	FW	(Namibia) Zenatha Coleman	12	12
3	19	FW	(Trinidad and Tobago) Kennya Cordner	9	9
4	27	FW	(Puerto Rico) Danielle Marcano	6	6
4	22	MF	(Turkey) Ecem Cumert	6	6
6	4	DF	(Turkey) Yaşam Göksu	5	5
6	24	DF	(Azerbaijan) Nazlıcan Parlak	5	5
8	7	FW	(Turkey) Setenay Sırım	4	4
9	3	DF	(Turkey) İlayda Cansu Kara	3	3
9	10	MF	(Turkey) Fatma Kara Şahinbaş	3	3
9	18	MF	(Ghana) Alice Kusi	3	3
9	34	DF	(Ghana) Faustina Adjei Kyeremeh	3	3
13	6	MF	(Turkey) Meryem Cennet Çal	1	1
13	23	MF	(Turkey) Zeynep Ülkü Kahya	1	1
Awarded				6	6
Totals				80	80

=== Assists ===
Rank	No.	Pos.	Player	Süper Lig	Total
1	6	MF	(Turkey) Meryem Cennet Çal	1	1
1	8	FW	(Namibia) Zenatha Coleman	1	1
1	27	FW	(Puerto Rico) Danielle Marcano	1	1
1	9	MF	(Turkey) Busem Şeker	1	1
Totals				4	4

=== Cleansheets ===
Rank	No.	Pos.	Player	Süper Lig	Total
1	1	GK	(Turkey) Ezgi Çağlar	7	7
2	21	GK	(Azerbaijan) Göknur Güleryüz	6	6
Totals				13	13

=== Disciplinary records ===
No.	Pos.	Player	Süper Lig			Total		
No.	Pos.	Player	Booked	(yellow card) (yellow-red card)	Sent off (straight red)	Booked	(yellow card) (yellow-red card)	Sent off (straight red)
22	MF	(Turkey) Ecem Cumert	5	1	0	5	1	0
6	MF	(Turkey) Meryem Cennet Çal	4	0	0	4	0	0
8	FW	(Namibia) Zenatha Coleman	4	0	0	4	0	0
27	FW	(Puerto Rico) Danielle Marcano	2	0	0	2	0	0
14	DF	(Mali) Fatou Dembele	2	0	0	2	0	0
30	DF	(Ivory Coast) Zote Kpaho	2	0	0	2	0	0
9	MF	(Turkey) Busem Şeker	1	0	1	1	0	1
18	MF	(Ghana) Alice Kusi	1	0	0	1	0	0
3	DF	(Turkey) İlayda Cansu Kara	1	0	0	1	0	0
4	DF	(Turkey) Yaşam Göksu	1	0	0	1	0	0
10	MF	(Turkey) Fatma Kara Şahinbaş	1	0	0	1	0	0
17	DF	(Turkey) Emine Yaren Çolak	1	0	0	1	0	0
24	DF	(Azerbaijan) Nazlıcan Parlak	1	0	0	1	0	0
19	FW	(Trinidad and Tobago) Kennya Cordner	1	0	0	1	0	0
Totals			27	1	1	27	1	1
