= Nina Kpaho =

Ivorian footballer (born 1996)

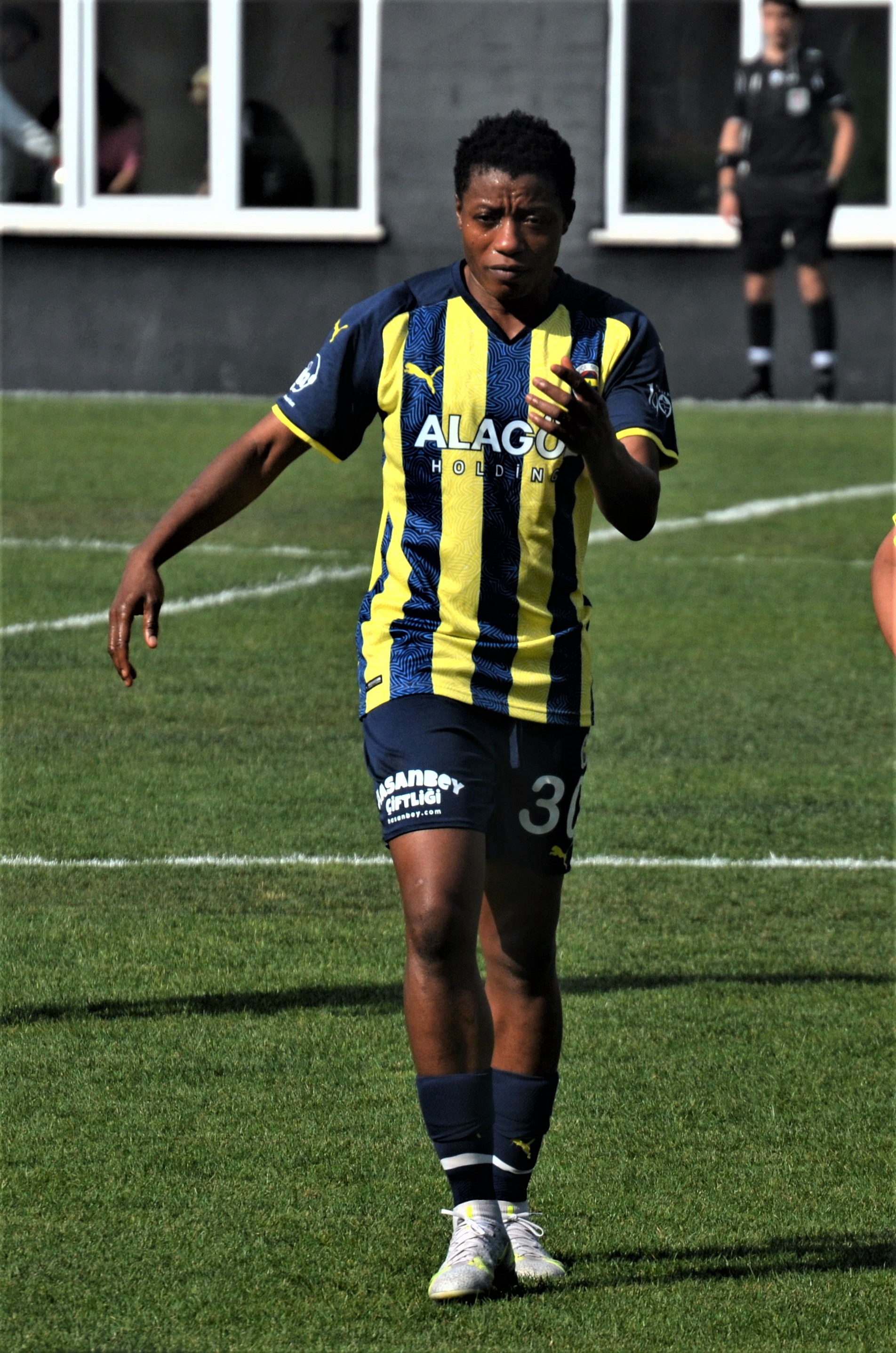
- Nina Kpaho of Fenerbahçe (May 2022)

Personal information
- Full name: Zote Nina Kpaho
- Date of birth: 30 December 1996 (age 29)
- Place of birth: Ivory Coast
- Height: 1.63 m (5 ft 4 in)
- Position: Defender

Youth career
- 2014–2015: Juventus de Yopougon

Senior career*
Years	Team	Apps	(Gls)
2018	FC Minsk	12	(2)
2018–2019	RC Saint-Denis		
2019–2020	Neman Grodno	28	(12)
2021	Juventus de Yopougon		
2021–2024	Fenerbahçe	62	(4)
2024–2025	Beylerbeyi	20	(1)
2025–2026	Giresun Sanayi	12	(2)

International career^{‡}
	Ivory Coast	14	(0)
- * Club domestic league appearances and goals as of 5 October 2025 ‡ National team caps and goals as of 26 July 2021

Zote Nina Kpaho (born 30 December 1996) is an Ivorian professional footballer who played as a defender. She was part of the Ivorian squad for the 2015 FIFA Women's World Cup.

== Club career ==
In the beginning of November 2021, Kpaho moved to Turkey, and signed with the newly re-established and in the Turkish Super League entered Fenerbahçe in Istanbul. She played three seasons with the team. In the 2024–25 Turkish Super League season, she transferred to Beylerbeyi.

In September 2025, she joined Giresun Sanayi, which was recently promoted to the Turkish Super League.

== Honours ==
Turkish Super League

Fenerbahçe
Runners-up (2): 2021–22, 2022–23
Third places (1): 2023–24

== See also ==
- List of Ivory Coast women's international footballers
