= Meryem Cennet Çal =

German-Turkish women's footballer (born 2000)

Personal information
- Full name: Meryem Cennet Çal
- Date of birth: 12 July 2000 (age 26)
- Place of birth: Germany
- Position: Midfielder

Team information
- Current team: Beşiktaş J.K.
- Number: 6

Senior career*
Years	Team	Apps	(Gls)
2016–2018	VfL Sindelfingen	31	(0)
2018–2021	TSG 1899 Hoffenheim	41	(3)
2022	BSC YB Frauen	8	(0)
2022–2024	Fenerbah.e S.K.	32	(2)
2024-	Beşiktaş J.K.		

International career^{‡}
2018–2019	Germany U-19	3	(1)
2023–	Turkey	22	(0)
- * Club domestic league appearances and goals as of 25 November 2023 ‡ National team caps and goals as of 30 May 2025

Meryem Cennet Çal (born 12 July 2000), also known as Meryem Çal or Cennet Çal, is a Germany-born Turkish footballer, who plays as a midfielder for Beşiktaş J.K. in the Turkish Women's Super League, and the Turkey women's national team. She was also a member of the Germany women's U-19 team. She had played in Germany and Switzerland before she moved to Turkey. She owns dual citizenship from Germany and Turkey.

== Club career ==
=== VfL Sindelfingen ===
Çal started her career in Germany at VfL Sindelfingen in the 2016–17 2. Frauen-Bundesliga and the 2016–17 DFB-Pokal Frauen. She continued to play for the team at the 2017–18 2. Frauen-Bundesliga and the 2017–18 DFB-Pokal Frauen. She capped 33 times in total for VfL Sindelfingen.

=== TSG 1899 Hoffenheim ===
In the 2018–19 2. Frauen-Bundesliga season, she transferred to TSG 1899 Hoffenheim, where she played three seasons scoring three goals in 41 matches in total.

=== BSC YB Frauen ===
In January 2022, she transferred to BSC YB Frauen to play in the second half of the 2021–22 Swiss Women's Super League season, where she played in eight matches.

=== Fenerbahçe S.K. ===
In June 2022, she moved to Turkey, and signed with Fenerbahçe S.K. to play in the 2022–23 Turkish Women's Football Super League.

== International career ==
=== Germany U-19 ===
In 2017 and 2018, Çal played for the Germany women's U-19 team three matches in total at the 2018, and the 2019 UEFA Women's Under-19 Championship qualification scoring one goal.

=== Turkey ===
Çal was admitted to the Turkey women's team, and debuten on 14 July 2023 in the friendly match against Estonia. She took part in three matches at the 2023–24 UEFA Women's Nations League C. She scoredone goal in the match against Lithuania at the 2023–24 UEFA Women's Nations League C.

International goals (Friendly matches not included)
Date	Venue	Opponent	Competition	Result	Scored
Turkey women's
1 December 2023	LFF Stadium, Vilnius, Lithuania	Lithuania	2023–24 UEFA Women's Nations League C	W 4–0	1

== Career statistics ==
As of match played on 5 December 2023

Club	Season	League			Continental		National		Total	
Club	Season	Division	Apps	Goals	Apps	Goals	Apps	Goals	Apps	Goals
Fenerbahçe S.K.	2022–23	Super League	21	1	–	–	0	0	21	1
Fenerbahçe S.K.	2023–24	Super League	11	1	–	–	7	1	18	2
Fenerbahçe S.K.	Total		32	2	–	–	7	1	39	3
Career total			32	2	–	–	7	1	39	3
