= Narin Yakut =

Turkish footballer (born 2004)

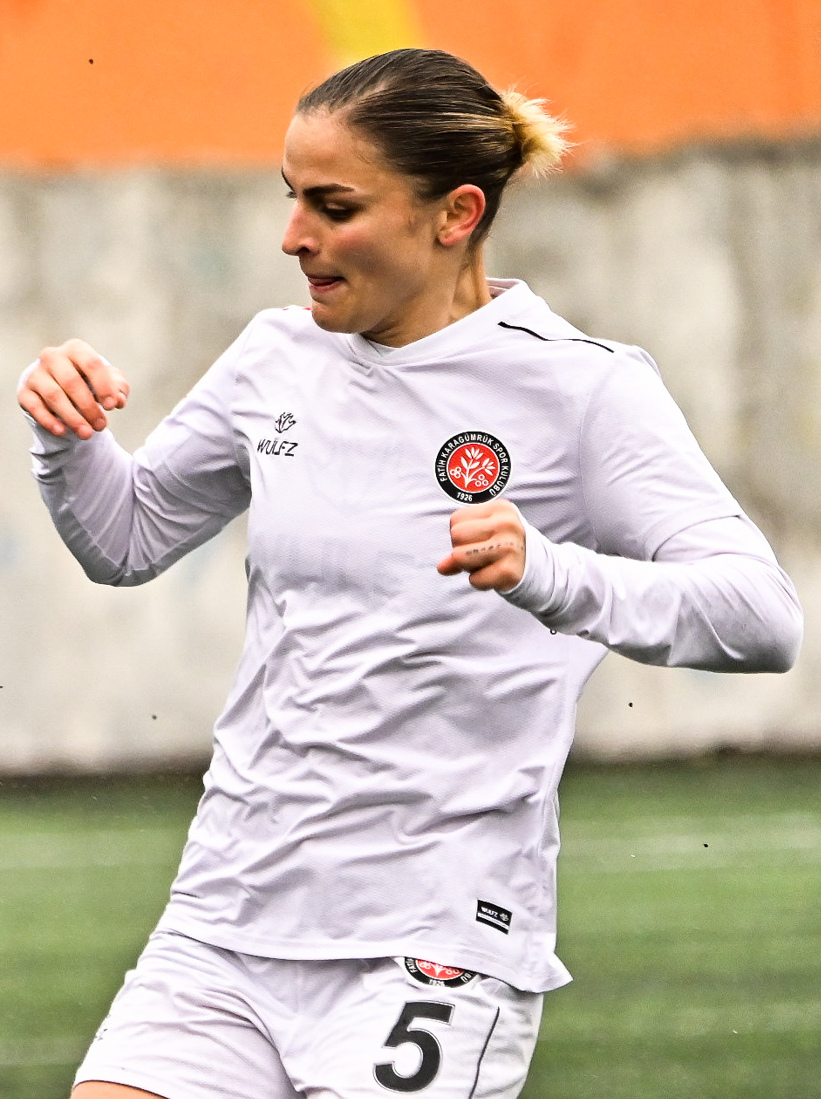
- Narin Yakut of Fatih Karagümrük in the 2023–24 Super League season.

Personal information
- Date of birth: 26 April 2004 (age 22)
- Place of birth: Kocasinan, Kayseri, Turkey
- Position: Defender

Team information
- Current team: Galatasaray
- Number: 23

Senior career*
Years	Team	Apps	(Gls)
2019–2021	Kayseri	15	(1)
2021–2023	Fenerbahçe	22	(3)
2023–2024	Fatih Karagümrük	29	(0)
2024–2025	Fatih Vatan	11	(0)
2025–	Galatasaray	0	(0)

International career^{‡}
2019–2020	Turkey U-17	10	(0)
2021–2023	Turkey U-19	8	(0)
2023–	Turkey	2	(0)
- * Club domestic league appearances and goals as of 15 December 2024 ‡ National team caps and goals as of 28 February 2024

Narin Yakut (born 26 April 2004) is a Turkish women's football defender who plays for Galatasaray in the Turkish Super League and the Turkey women's national team.

== Early years ==
Before schooling, Yakut played football with older boys on the street, positioned as goalkeeper. In the primary school and middle school, she performed athletics, running in the 100 m event. She won several medals in the youth and junior categories. After getting more interested in football, she entered the school girls' football team in the middle school. She played futsal, her school team in the İbrahim Tennuri Middle School took the first and then the second place in the Turkish championship.

She was invited to join the newly established women's football side of Kayseri Gençler Birliği, which was later renamed Kayseri Kadın.

== Club career ==
=== Kayseri ===
Yakut obtained her license from her hometown club Kayseri Kadın on 5 May 20016. She debuted in the 2019–20 Turkish Second League season on 13 October 2019. She played the next season in the 2020–21 Turkish Women's League, which was the only women's league held due to the COVID-19 pandemic in Turkey. She scored one goal in 15 games in two seasons.

=== Fenerbahçe ===
In April 2021 after the end of the season, she moved to Istanbul at age 17, and signed a deal with the newly established team Fenerbahçe to play in the 2021–22 Super League season. She appeared in the starting eleven of her team's first match ever, an exhibition match against the archrival Galatasaray, which ended with a 7–0 victory for her team. Fenerbahçe finished the 2022–23 Super League season as runner-up after losing to Ankara BB Fomget in the play-offs final. She played in 22 matches and scored three goals in two seasons.

=== Fatih Karagümrük ===
In the 2023–24 Super League season, she joined Fatih Karagümrük in Istanbul, as she wanted to appear more time on the field

=== Fatih Vatan ===
For the 2024–25 Super League season, she transferred to Fatih Vatan.

=== Galatasaray ===
On August 1, 2025, she signed a contract with the Turkish giant Galatasaray.

== International career ==
=== Turkey girls' youth team ===
Yakut was invited to the Turkey girls's U-15 team before she became a member of the Turkey girls' U-17 team between 2019 and 2020. She played three matches at the 2019 UEFA Girls' U-16 Development Tournament in Poland and three games at the 2020 UEFA Women's Under-17 Championship qualification. She capped ten times in total.

=== Turkey women's junior team ===
In 2021, she was admitted to the national U-19 team and played until 2023. She played at the 2022 UEFA Women's Under-19 Championship qualification – Group A4 and 2023 UEFA Women's Under-19 Championship qualification – Group B2 in three matches each. She capped in eight games in total, and captained in one game.

=== Turkey women's team ===
On 5 December 2023, she debuted in Turkey women's national team in the 2023–24 UEFA Women's Nations League C – Group 2 match against Georgia. She is on the squad playing in the UEFA Women's Euro 2025 qualifying League B – Group 1.

== Personal life ==
Narin Yakut was born to Süleyman and Yeter Yakut in Kocasinan district of Kayseri, Turkey on 26 April 2004. She is the youngest of three children. Her sister Habibe is five, her brother Mustafa is ten years older.

She attended high school in her hometown Kayseri. After transferring to Fenerbahçe, she moved to Istanbul, and completed her secondary education in a private high school. She then entered Fenerbahçe University to study sports coaching.

== Career statistics ==
As of match played on 15 December 2024.

Club	Season	League			Continental		National		Total	
Club	Season	Division	Apps	Goals	Apps	Goals	Apps	Goals	Apps	Goals
Kayseri	2018–19	Second League			–	–	3	0	3	0
Kayseri	2019–20	Second League	11	0	–	–	7	0	18	0
Kayseri	2020–21	First League	4	1	–	–	0	0	4	1
Kayseri	Total		15	1	–	–	10	0	25	1
Fenerbahçe	2021–22	Super League	13	3	–	–	5	0	18	3
Fenerbahçe	2022–23	Supert League	9	0	–	–	3	0	12	0
Fenerbahçe	Total		22	3	–	–	8	0	30	3
Fatih Karagümrük	2023–24	Super League	29	0	–	–	2	0	31	0
Fatih Vatan	2024–25	Super League	11	0	–	–	0	0	11	0
Career total			77	4	–	–	20	0	97	4

== Honours ==
Turkish Super League
Fenerbahçe

Runners-up (1): 2022–23.
