= Busem Şeker =

Turkish-German footballer (born 1998)

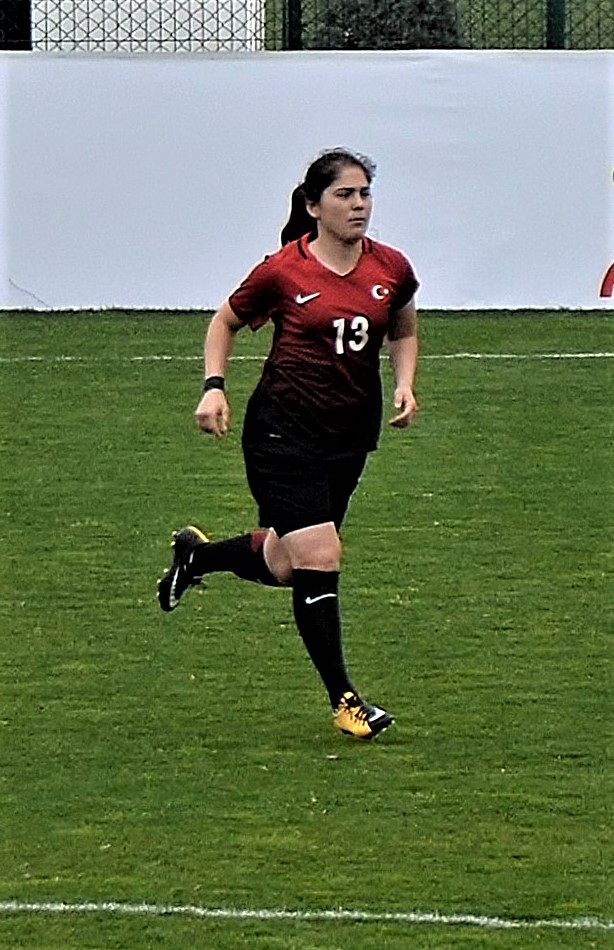
- Busem Şeker for Turkey (April 2018)

Personal information
- Date of birth: 19 July 1998 (age 28)
- Place of birth: Hamburg, Germany
- Position: Midfielder

Team information
- Current team: Fenerbahçe
- Number: 9

Youth career
- FTSV Lorbeer Rothenburgsort

Senior career*
Years	Team	Apps	(Gls)
2014–2015	FTSV Lorbeer Rothenburgsort		
2015–2016	ASV Bergedorf 85		
2016–2018	SV Henstedt-Ulzburg	15	(1)
2018–2019	Konak Belediyespor	16	(4)
2019–2020	Hamburger SV	5	(0)
2020–2022	Konak Belediyespor	27	(6)
2022–	Fenerbahçe	95	(32)

International career^{‡}
2017–	Turkey	48	(7)
- * Club domestic league appearances and goals as of 5 March 2023 ‡ National team caps and goals as of 3 June 2025

Busem Şeker (born 19 July 1998) is a Turkish-German football midfielder currently playing in the Turkish Women's Football Super League for Fenerbahçe. She is a member of the Turkey women's national team.

== Private life ==
Busem Şeker was born in Hamburg, Germany on 19 July 1998. She resides in Rothenburgsort, a borough of Hamburg. She is a high school student, and hopes to pass the Abitur at the end of the 2016/17 term. She also jobs in the hotel and restaurant business. She did a 'Freiwilliges Soziales Jahr' in 2017/18 in Hamburg.

== Club career ==
Şeker got interested in football playing already at the age of four. She began her playing career in the youth team of FTSV Lorbeer Rothenburgsort. There, she was the only girl among boys. She made it to become also captain of the youth team, at which she was respected by her male playmates. At the age of 17, she transferred to ASV Bergedorf 85. After one season, she signed with SV Henstedt-Ulzburg in the German 2nd Women's Football Bundesliga North.

She coached the "F-Jugend" team (age group 7–8 years old) of her initial club, at which still only boys play.

On 11 October 2018, she went to Turkey to play for the İzmir-based club Konak Belediyespor in the 2018–19 Women's First League. After playing one season, at which she scored five goals in 16 matches, she returned to Germany on 27 August 2019.

On 15 April 2021, she joined her former club Konak Belediyespor to play in the 2020-21 Turkish Women's Football League. After two seasons and seven goals in 27 matches, she transferred to Fenerbahçe S.K. in Istanbul on 10 October 2022 to play in the 2022–23 Women's Super League season.

== International career ==
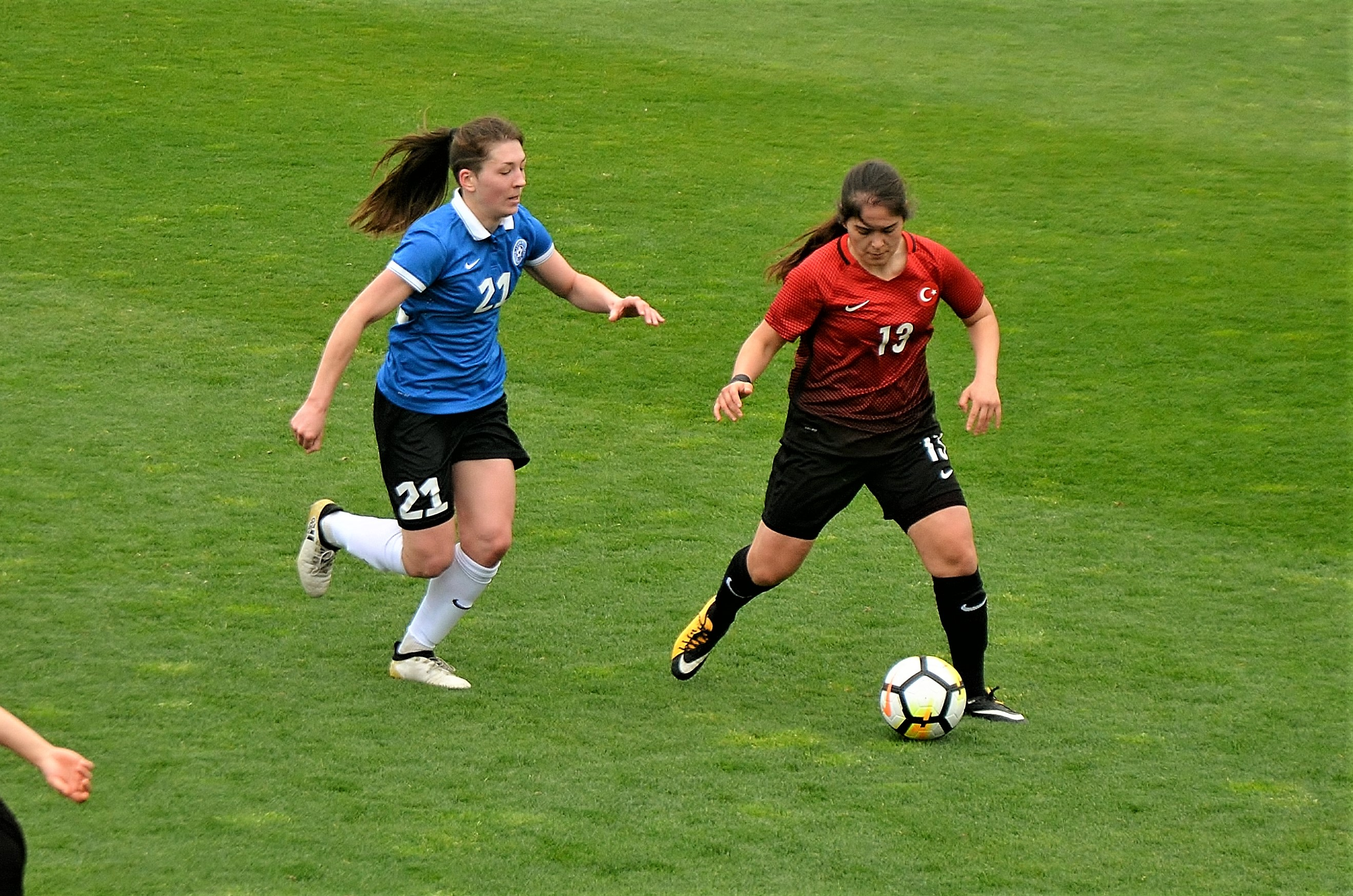
Busem Şeker (red/black) playing for Turkey in the friendly match against Estonia at TFF Riva Facility on April 7, 2018.

Şeker was approached by Çağla Korkmaz, Turkish-German player of VfL Wolfsburg II, for joining the Turkey women's national team that she prompt accepted. She was admitted to the national team, and debuted internationally in the Goldcity Women's Cup 2017 on 1 March 2017. She took part at the 2019 FIFA Women's World Cup qualification – UEFA preliminary round – Group 4 matches.

== Career statistics ==
As of 8 April 2023.

Club	Season	League			Continental		National		Total	
Club	Season	Division	Apps	Goals	Apps	Goals	Apps	Goals	Apps	Goals
SV Henstedt-Ulzburg	2016–18	German 2nd Bundesliga North	15	1	0	0	9	0	24	1
SV Henstedt-Ulzburg	Total		15	1	0	0	9	0	24	1
Konak Belediyespor	2018–19	Turkish First League	16	4	0	0	4	0	20	4
Konak Belediyespor	Total		16	4	0	0	4	0	20	4
Hamburger SV	2019–20	Frauen-Regionalliga Nord	5	0	0	0	1	0	6	0
Hamburger SV	Total		5	0	0	0	1	0	6	0
Konak Belediyespor	2020–21	Turkish Women's First Football League	4	0	0	0	0	0	4	0
Konak Belediyespor	2021–22	Turkish Women's Football Super League	23	6	0	0	4	0	27	6
Konak Belediyespor	Total		27	6	0	0	4	0	27	6
Fenerbahçe	2022–23	Super League	18	13	0	0	8	3	26	16
Fenerbahçe	2023–24	Super League	27	4	0	0	10	1	27	5
Fenerbahçe	2024–25	Super League	22	4	0	0	8	0	29	4
Fenerbahçe	2025–26	Super League	23	8	0	0	8	3	31	11
Fenerbahçe	2026–27	Super League	6	3	4	1	0	0	10	4
Fenerbahçe	Total		96	32	4	1	34	7	134	40
Career total			159	43	4	1	51	7	214	51

== International goals ==
No.	Date	Venue	Opponent	Score	Result	Competition
1.	8 April 2023	Dalga Arena, Baku, Azerbaijan	Azerbaijan	1–0	1–0	Friendly
2.	14 July 2023	Kadriorg Stadium, Tallinn, Estonia	Estonia	3–0	3–0	Friendly
3.	17 July 2023	Kadriorg Stadium, Tallinn, Estonia	Estonia	2–0	2–2	Friendly
4.	16 July 2024	Ménfői úti Stadion, Győr, Hungary	Hungary	1–0	4–1	UEFA Women's Euro 2025 qualifying
5.	24 October 2025	Fadil Vokrri Stadium, Pristina, Kosovo	Kosovo	4–0	4–0	2025 UEFA Women's Nations League play-off matches
6.	28 October 2025	Gürsel Aksel Stadium, İzmir, Turkey	Kosovo	3–0	3–0	2025 UEFA Women's Nations League play-off matches
7.	5 June 2026	Pendik Stadium, Istanbul, Turkey	Northern Ireland	2–1	2–1	2027 FIFA Women's World Cup qualification

== Honours ==
Turkish Women's First Football League

Konak Belediyespor
Third places (1): 2018–19

Fenerbahçe
Winners (1): 2025–26
