= Genevieve Ngo Mbeleck =

Cameroonian footballer

Genevieve Ngo
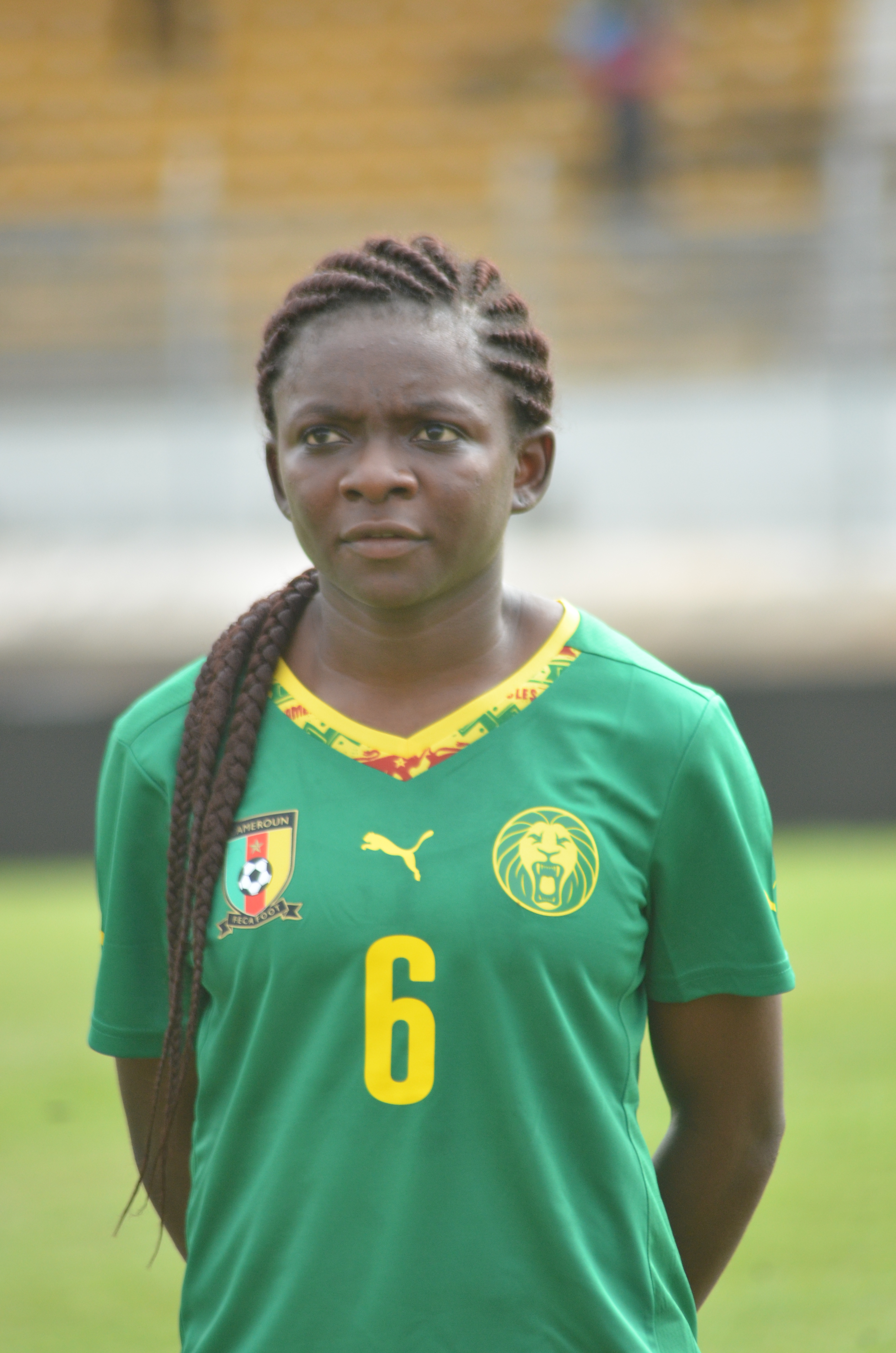

Personal information
- Full name: Genevieve Edith Ngo Mbeleck
- Date of birth: 10 March 1993 (age 33)
- Place of birth: Cameroon
- Height: 1.59 m (5 ft 3 in)
- Position: Midfielder

Team information
- Current team: Sirnak Belediyegucu

Senior career*
| Years | Team | Apps | (Gls) |
| 2015–2016 | FC Minsk | 7 | (10) |
| 2017–2018 | Sporting de Huelva | 24 | (2) |
| 2023 | Fenerbahçe | 3 | (0) |
| 2023–2025 | Beijing Jingtan | | |
| 2025–2026 | Amed | 20 | (19) |
| 2026– | Sirnak Belediyegucu | 0 | (0) |

International career^{‡}
| 2015– | Cameroon | 8 | (1) |
Medal record
Women's Africa Cup of Nations
| Gold medal – first place | 2026 Morocco |
- * Club domestic league appearances and goals as of 21 Septembery 2025 ‡ National team caps and goals as of 22:10, 16 July 2023 (UTC)

Genevieve Edith Ngo Mbeleck (born 10 March 1993) is a Cameroonian footballer who plays as a midfielder for Sirnak Belediyegucu.

== Club career ==
Played for FC Minsk (women) in 2015 and 2016 and played the Champions League with them. Then played for Louves Minproff in Cameroon. In 2017 she signed with Spain's Sporting Huelva.

In September 2025, she returned to Turkey, and joined the Diyarbakır-based club Amed.
