= Beylerbeyi 75. Year Stadium =

Football stadium in Istanbul, Turkey

- Beylerbeyi 75. Yıl Stadyumu
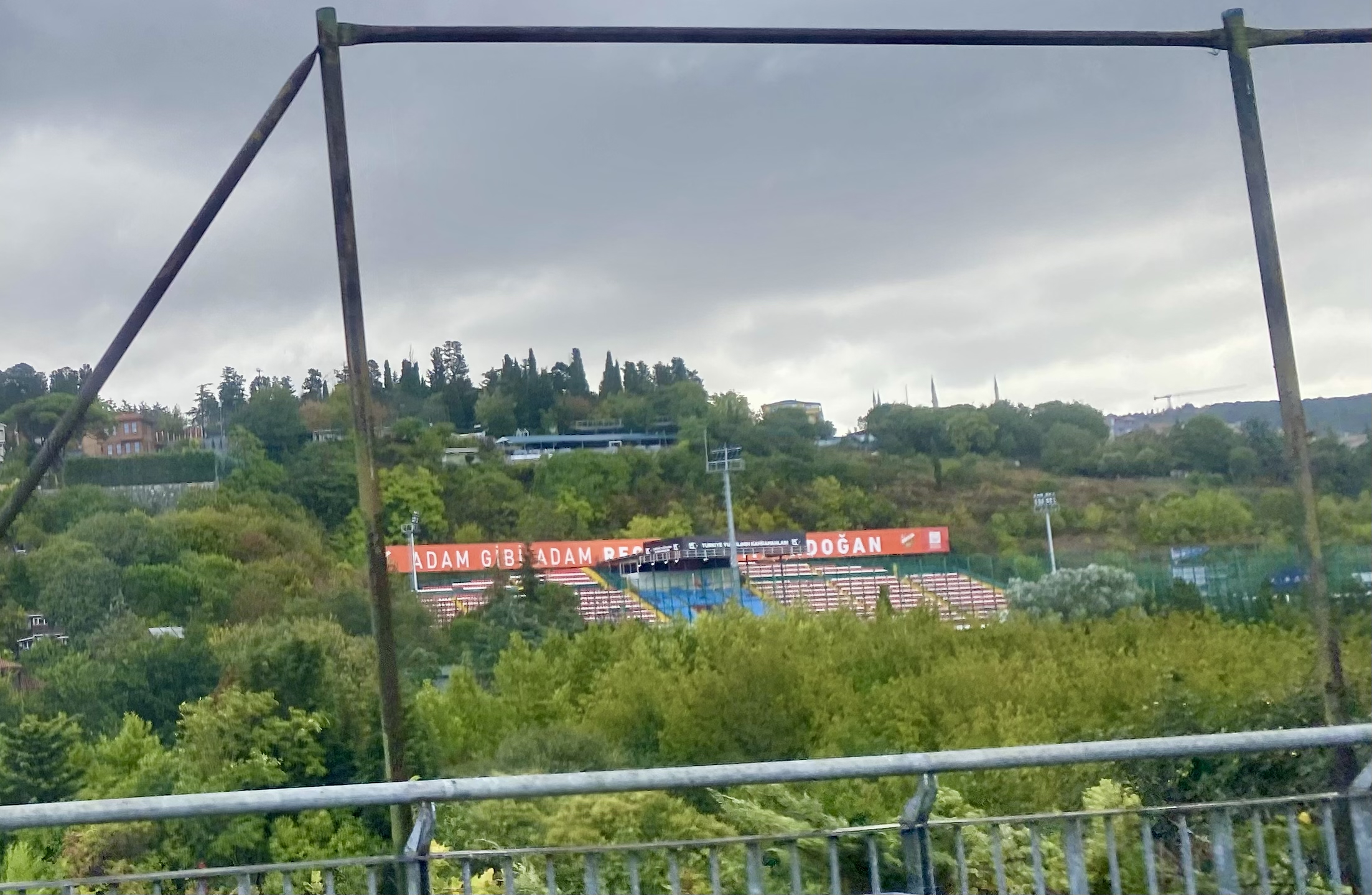

- Location of the stadium in Istanbul, Turkey
- Former names: Beylerbeyi Stadium
- Address: Abdullah Ağa Cad. 2, 34676 Beylerbeyi
- Location: Üsküdar, Istanbul, Turkey
- Coordinates: 41.03906°N 29.04592°E
- Owner: Istanbul Directorate General of Foundations
- Operator: Beylerbeyi S.K.
- Capacity: 5,500
- Surface: Artificial turf
- Field size: 105 m × 68 m (115 yd × 74 yd)

Construction
- Opened: 1900; 126 years ago
- Renovated: 2021

Tenants
- Beylerbeyi S.K. Fenerbahçe S.K. women's

Beylerbeyi 75. Year Stadium (Turkish: Beylerbeyi 75. Yıl Stadyumu), formerly known as the Beylerbeyi Stadium, is a football stadium in the Beylerbeyi neighborhood of the Üsküdar district in Istanbul, Turkey.

The venue was established in 1900. It is owned by the Istanbul Directorate General of Foundations, and run by Beylerbeyi S.K.. It underwent a restoration, and was reopened in March 2021. It has a capacity of 5,500 in one covered and two open bleachers. The artificial turf field with dimensions 105 m × 68 m (115 yd × 74 yd) is floodlight illumination.

The stadium is the home ground of Beylerbeyi S.K., and Fenerbahçe S.K. women's football team.

== International events hosted ==
In May 2019, the venue hosted the International women's rugby league match between Turkey and Italy.
