= Sevinç Çorlu =

Turkish footballer (born 1990)

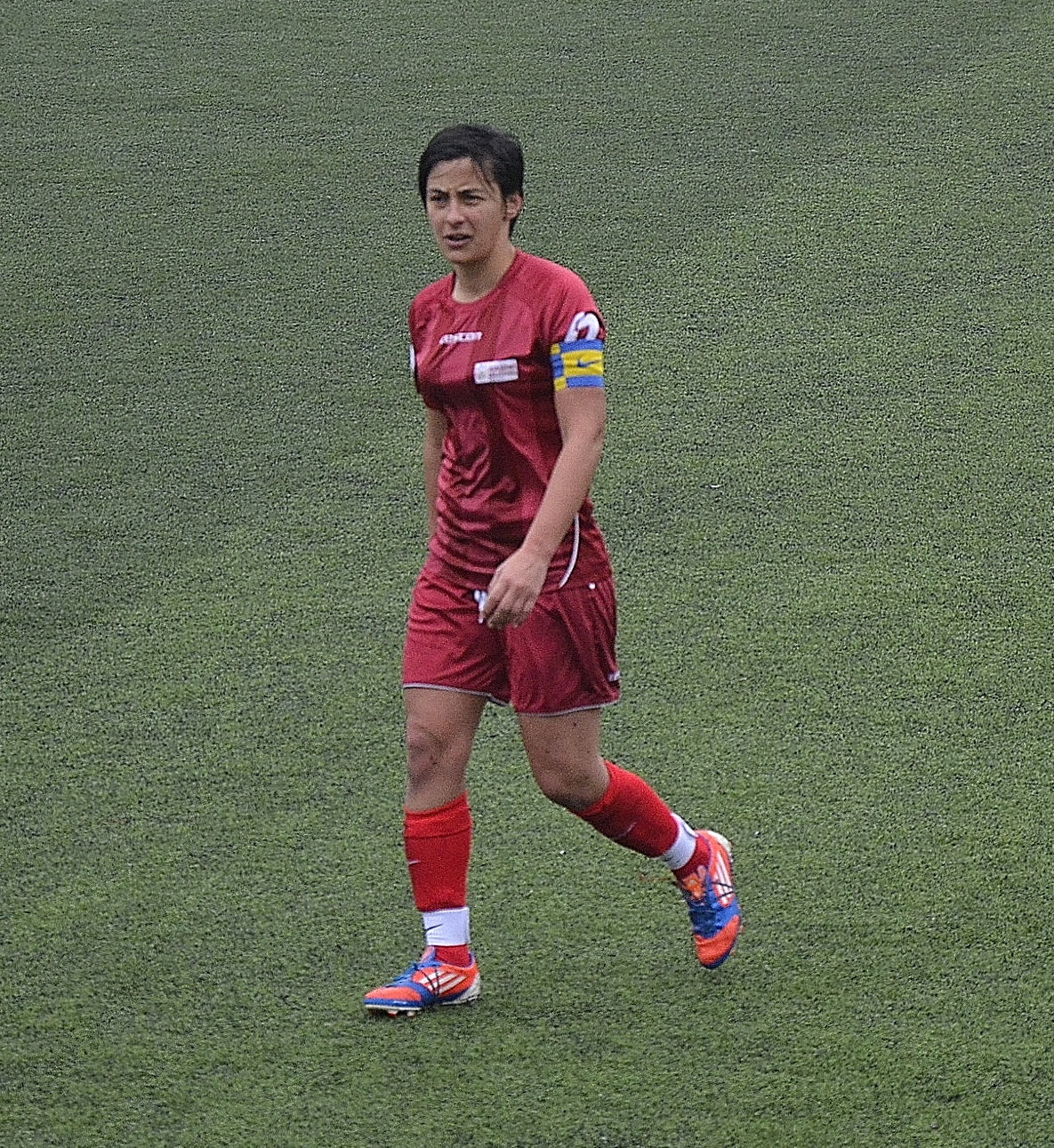
- Sevinç Çorlu for Ataşehir Belediyespor (March 2014)

Personal information
- Date of birth: December 3, 1990 (age 35)
- Place of birth: Kadıköy, Istanbul, Turkey
- Position: Defender

Senior career*
Years	Team	Apps	(Gls)
2008–2009	Ümraniye Mevlana Lisesispor	7	(0)
2009–2017	Ataşehir Belediyespor	138	(16)
2017–2022	Konak Belediyespor	48	(0)
2022–2023	Fenerbahçe	19	(0)

International career^{‡}
2008	Turkey U-19	5	(0)
2014–2015	Turkey	7	(0)
- * Club domestic league appearances and goals as of 22:12, 16 July 2023 (UTC) ‡ National team caps and goals as of November 25, 2015

Sevinç Çorlu (born December 3, 1990) is a Turkish women's footballer who plays as a defender. She is member of the Turkey women's national team since 2008.

== Career ==
=== Club ===
Sevinç Çorlu began her football career after she obtained her license on May 11, 2007. During her high school years, she played in the school team Ümraniye Mevlana Lisesispor for one season. She then became part of the club Ataşehirspor in the 2009–10 season, where she plays since then uninterrupted. Currently, she is captain of the team.

Çorlu enjoyed to successive league championships in the 2010–11 and 2011–12 seasons. She participated at the 2011–12 UEFA Women's Champions League and 2012–13 UEFA Women's Champions League matches.

In August 2018, she transferred to the İzmir-based rival Konak Belediyespor. She took part in three matches of the 2017–18 UEFA Women's Champions League qualifying round.

=== International ===
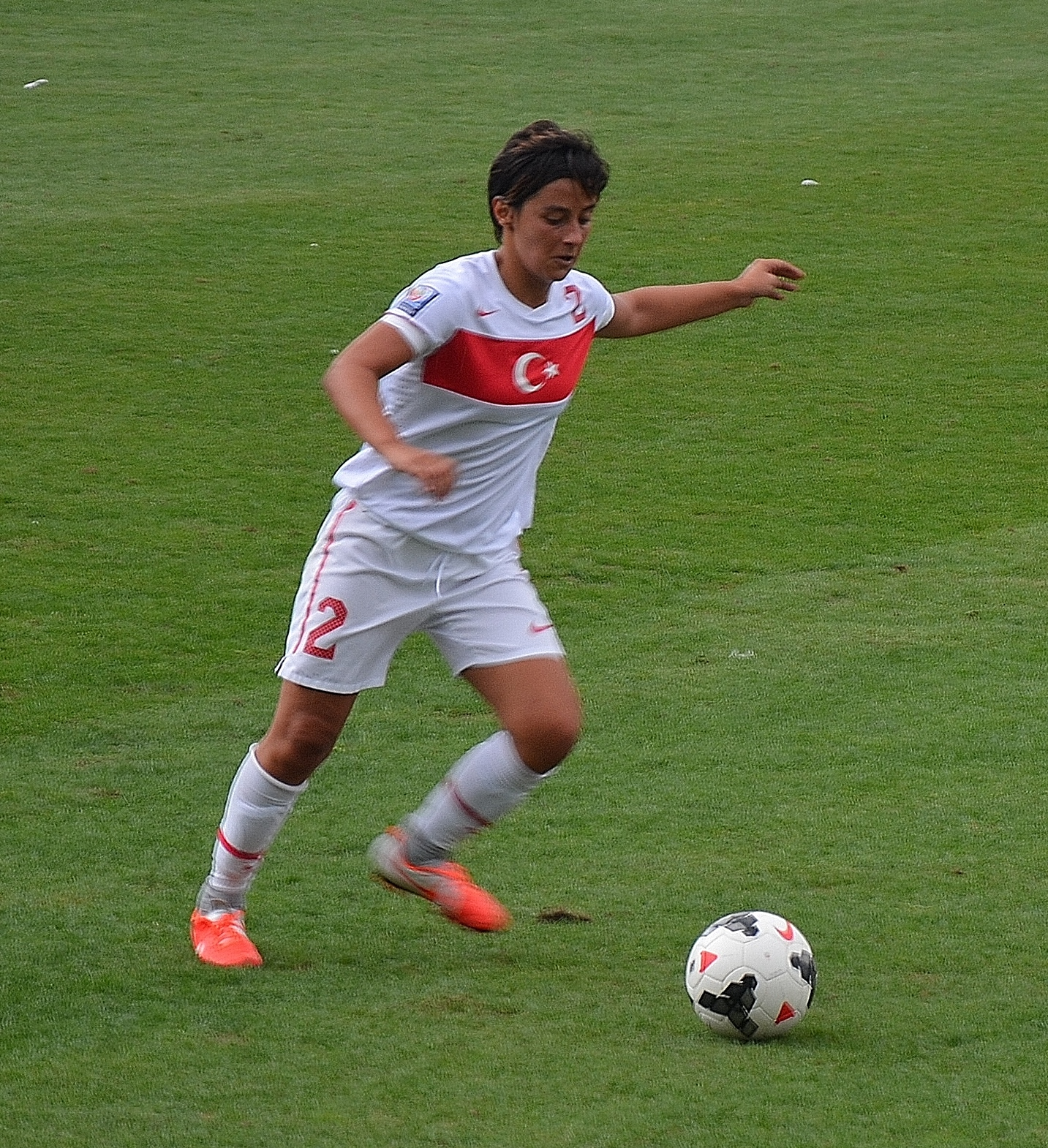
Sevinç Çorlu playing for Turkey in the 2015 FIFA Women's World Cup qualification – UEFA Group 6 match against Belarus

Çorlu was admitted to the Turkey women's U-19 national team, and debuted in the 2009 UEFA Women's U-19 Championship qualification match against Austria on September 25, 2008. She capped 3 times in the U-19 national team.

She played first time for the national team in the friendly match against Kazakhstan on March 14, 2008. She was called up for the UEFA Women's Euro 2013 qualifying – Group 2 matches, had however to sit on the bench. Çorlu played at the 2015 FIFA Women's World Cup qualification – UEFA Group 6 match against Belarus.

== Career statistics ==
As of match played June 5, 2022.

Club	Season	League			Continental		National		Total	
Club	Season	Division	Apps	Goals	Apps	Goals	Apps	Goals	Apps	Goals
Ümraniye Mevlana Lisesispor	2008–09	Second League	7	0	–	–	5	0	12	0
Ümraniye Mevlana Lisesispor	Total		7	0	–	–	5	0	12	0
Ataşehir Belediyespor	2009–10	First League	14	2	–	–	0	0	14	2
Ataşehir Belediyespor	2010–11	First League	21	3	–	–	0	0	21	3
Ataşehir Belediyespor	2011–12	First League	15	0	3	0	0	0	18	0
Ataşehir Belediyespor	2012–13	First League	18	3	3	0	0	0	21	3
Ataşehir Belediyespor	2013–14	First League	18	0	–	–	3	0	21	0
Ataşehir Belediyespor	2014–15	First League	17	3	–	–	2	0	19	3
Ataşehir Belediyespor	2015–16	First League	17	3	–	–	2	0	19	3
Ataşehir Belediyespor	2016–17	First League	18	2	–	–	0	0	18	2
Ataşehir Belediyespor	Total		138	16	6	0	7	0	151	16
Konak Belediyespor	2017–18	First League	19	0	3	0	0	0	22	0
Konak Belediyespor	2018–19	First League	15	0	0	0	0	0	15	0
Konak Belediyespor	2019–20	First League	10	0	0	0	0	0	10	0
Konak Belediyespor	2020–21	First League	3	0	0	0	0	0	3	0
Konak Belediyespor	2021–22	Super League	1	0	0	0	0	0	1	0
Konak Belediyespor	Total		48	0	3	0	0	0	51	0
Fenerbahçe	2021–22	Super League	12	0	0	0	0	0	12	0
Fenerbahçe	Total		12	0	0	0	0	0	12	0
Career total			205	16	9	0	12	0	226	16

== Honours ==
Turkish Women's First Football League

Ataşehir Belediyespor
Winners (2): 2010–11, 2011–12
Runners-up (4): 2012–13, 2013–14, 2014–15, 2015–16

Turkish Women's Second League

Ümraniye Mevlana Lisesispor
Winners (1): 2008–09
