= Ecem Cumert =

German–Turkish footballer (born 1998)

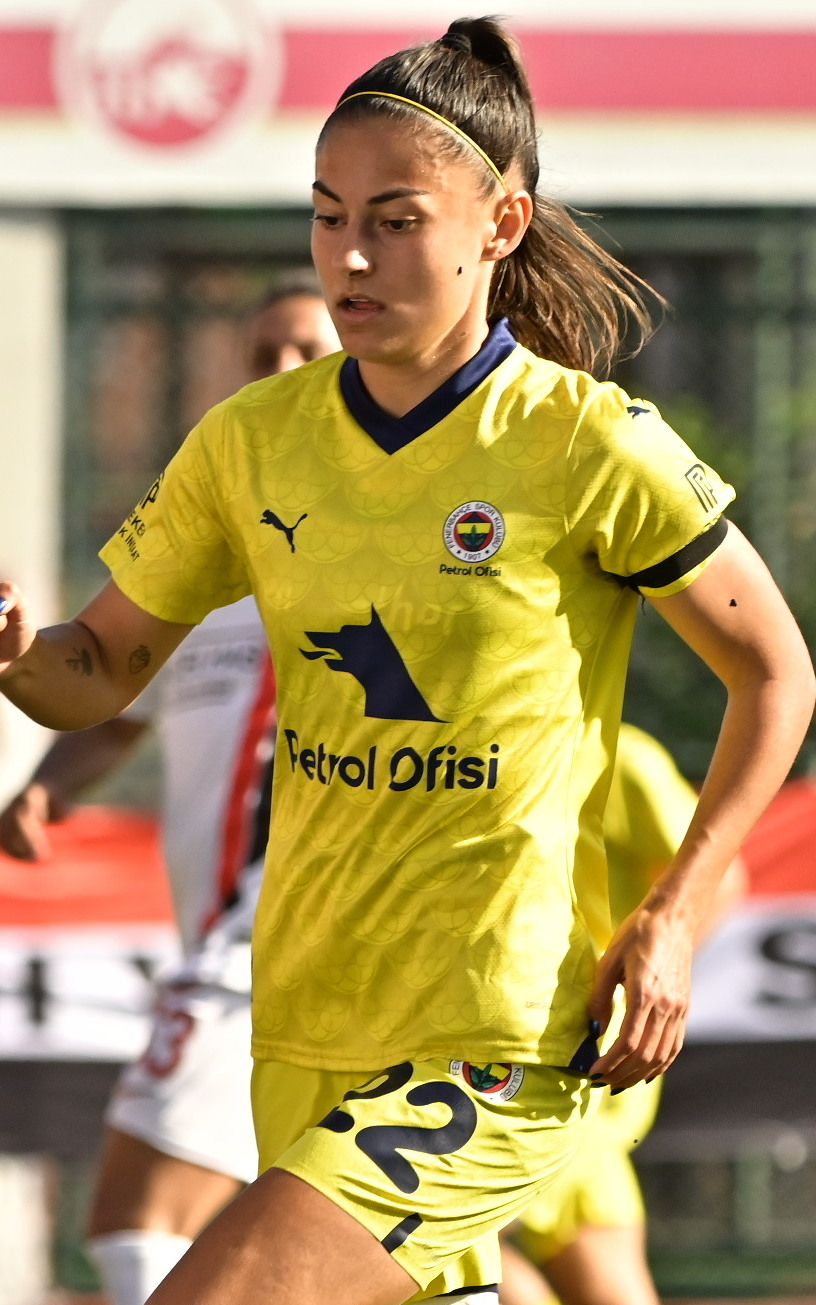
- Cumert for Fenerbahçe in the 2023–24 season

Personal information
- Date of birth: 7 February 1998 (age 28)
- Place of birth: Ehingen, Baden-Württemberg, Germany
- Position: Midfielder

Team information
- Current team: Galatasaray
- Number: 22

Youth career
- 2014–2015: SC Freiburg

Senior career*
Years	Team	Apps	(Gls)
2016–2017	SC Freiburg II	22	(4)
2017–2018	Ataşehir Belediyespor	17	(2)
2018-2020	SV Alberweiler	16	(10)
2020-2021	MSV Duisburg	7	(0)
2021–2022	ALG Spor	25	(7)
2022–2024	Fenerbahçe	11	(5)
2024–	Galatasaray	19	(0)

International career^{‡}
2016	Turkey U19	3	(0)
2017–	Turkey	21	(2)
- * Club domestic league appearances and goals as of 31 July 2025 ‡ National team caps and goals as of 25 June 2022

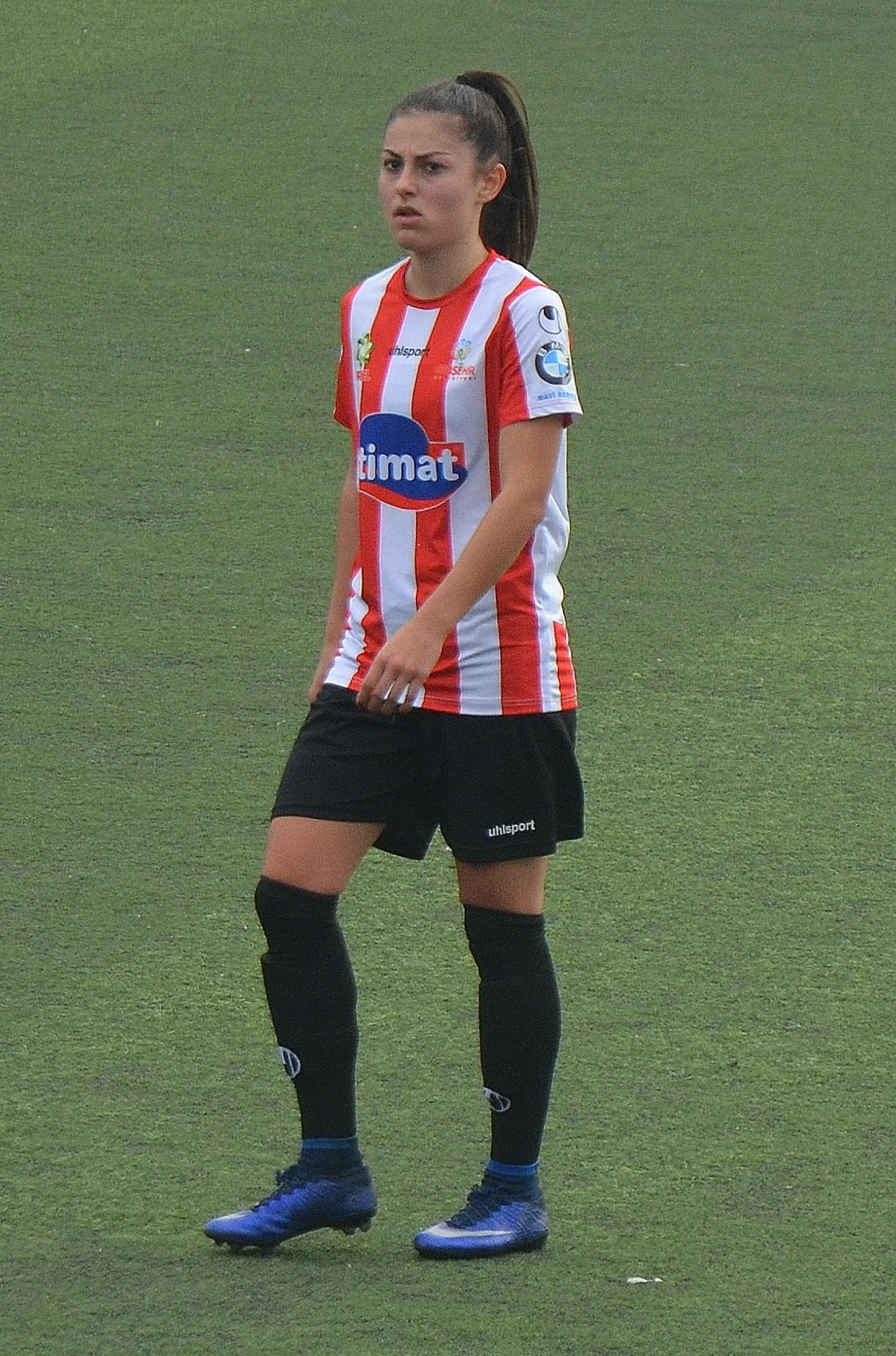
Cumert for Ataşehir Belediyespor in the 2017–18 season.

Ecem Cumert (born 7 February 1998) is a German-born Turkish footballer, who plays as a midfielder for Turkish Women's Super League club Galatasaray and the Turkey national team.

== Early life ==
Cumert was born in Ehingen, Baden-Württemberg, Germany on 7 February 1998. She has dual citizenship of Germany and Turkey. She lived till the age of 14 in Munderkingen with her brother Mert Cumert, her sisters Gülafer-Ceren Cumert and Cemre Cumert, and her parents Ayfer Cumert and Cemal Cumert. She then moved to Freiburg to start her football career.

== Club career ==
=== SC Freiburg ===
Cumert played in Germany for SC Freiburg in the German Frauen-Bundesliga. Between 2014 and 2017, she capped 22 times and scored four goals in total. At the end of the 2016–17 Frauen-Regionalliga season, her team became champion of the Group South and was promoted to the 2. Frauen-Bundesliga.

=== Ataşehir Belediyespor ===
In September 2017, she moved to Turkey and transferred to the Istanbul-based Ataşehir Belediyespor to play in the Turkish Women's First Football League.

=== SV Alberweiler ===
After scoring two goals in 17 matches of the 2017-18 season, she returned to Germany to play for her hometown club SV Alberweiler in the Frauen-Regionalliga Süd. She capped in 16 games and scored ten goals for SV Alberweiler in two seasons.

=== MSV Duisburg ===
Cumert transferred to MSV Duisburg for the 2020–21 Frauen-Bundesliga season.

=== ALG Spor ===
In Summer 2021, she went to Turkey again, and joined Gaziantep-based ALG Spor to play in the 2021–22 Women's Super League.

=== Fenerbahçe ===
In the 2022-23 Turkish Women's Super League season, she transferred to Fenerbahçe S.K.

=== Galatasaray ===
On 23 August 2024, Cumert signed a one-year contract with Turkish Super League club Galatasaray.

She signed a new 1-year contract with Galatasaray on 31 July 2025.

== International career ==
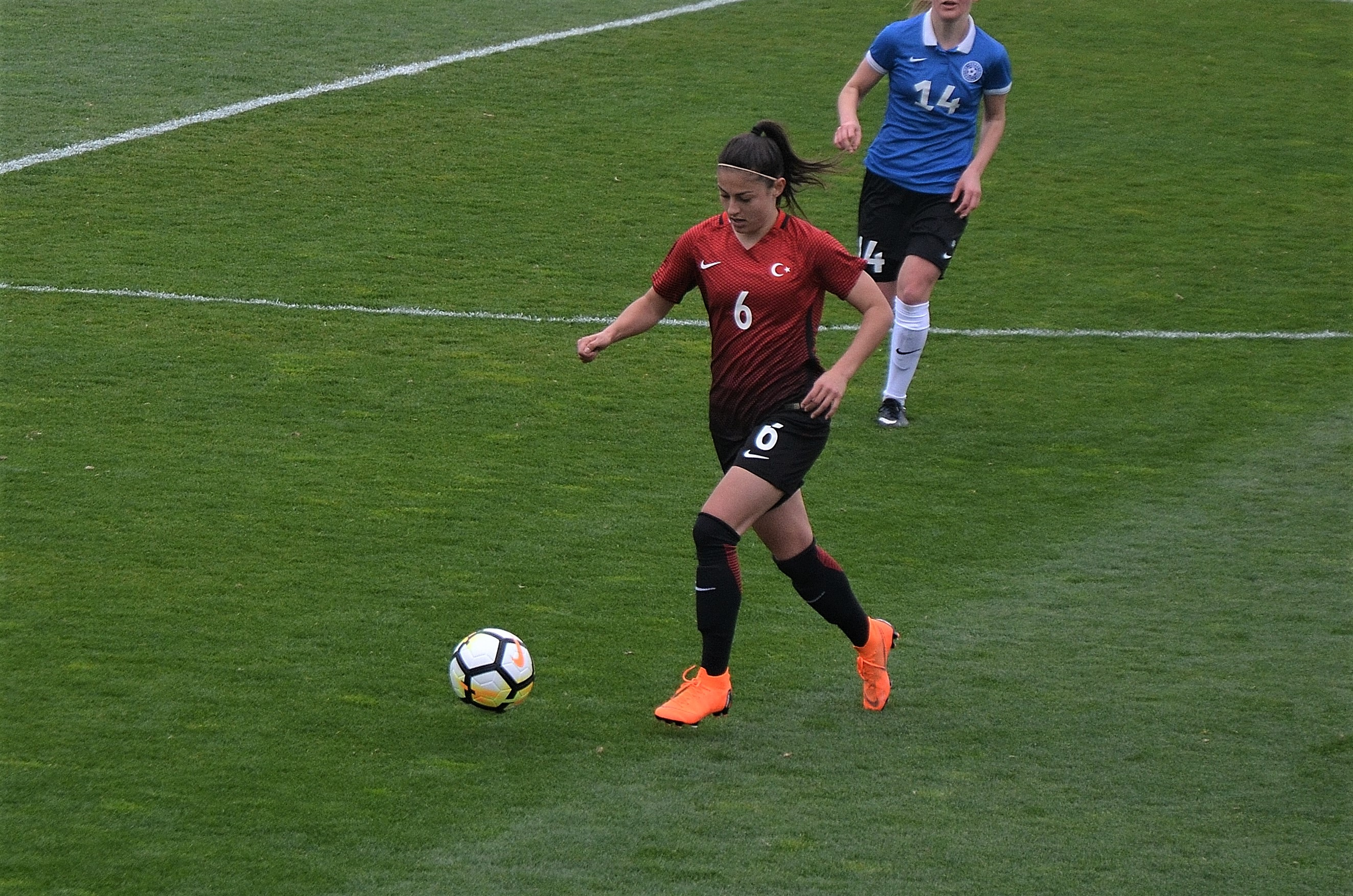
Ecem Cumert (red/black) playing for Turkey national in the friendly match against Estonia at TFF Riva Facility on 7 April 2018.

Cumert played for the German national U-17 team before she switched over to the Turkey national team. She played in the Turkish national U-19 team in three matches at the 2017 UEFA Under-19 European Championship qualification – Group 10.

She was admitted to the Turkey national team and debuted internationally in the 2019 FIFA World Cup qualification – UEFA preliminary round – Group 4 match against Montenegro. She played in four of the UEFA European Championship 2021 qualifying Group A matches. She enjoyed the 2021-22 Women's Super League champion title of her team.

== Career statistics ==
=== Club ===
As of 18 January 2023.

Club	Season	League			Continental		National		Total	
Club	Season	Division	Apps	Goals	Apps	Goals	Apps	Goals	Apps	Goals
SC Freiburg	2014–15	B-Juniors-Bundesliga South	10	1	–	–	0	0	10	1
SC Freiburg	2016–17	Frauen-Regionalliga South	12	3	–	–	7	0	19	3
SC Freiburg	Total		22	4	-	-	7	0	29	4
Ataşehir Belediyespor	2017–18	Turkish Women's First League	17	2	–	–	3	0	20	2
Ataşehir Belediyespor	Total		17	2	-	-	3	0	20	2
SV Alberweiler	2018–19	Frauen-Regionalliga Süd	13	7	–	–	4	1	17	8
SV Alberweiler	2019-20	Frauen-Regionalliga Süd	3	3	–	–	4	0	7	3
SV Alberweiler	Total		16	10	-	-	8	1	24	11
MSV Duisburg	2020–21	Frauen-Bundesliga	7	0	–	–	3	1	10	1
MSV Duisburg	Total		7	0	-	-	3	1	10	1
ALG Spor	2021–22	Super League	25	7	–	–	3	0	28	7
ALG Spor	Total		25	7	-	-	3	0	28	7
Fenerbahçe S.K.	2022–23	Super League	11	5	–	–	0	0	11	5
Fenerbahçe S.K.	Total5		11	5	-	-	0	0	11	5
Career total			98	28	-	-	24	2	122	30

=== International ===
No.	Date	Venue	Opponent	Score	Result	Competition
1.	14 June 2021	TFF Riva Facility, Istanbul, Turkey	Bulgaria	2–0	3–1	Friendly

== Honours ==
Frauen-Regionalliga South

SC Freiburg II
Winners (1): 2016–17.

Turkish Women's Super League

ALG Spor
Winners (1): 2021-22
Ataşehir Belediyespor
Winners (1): 2017–18
