= Nazlıcan Parlak =

Azerbaijani footballer (born 1993)

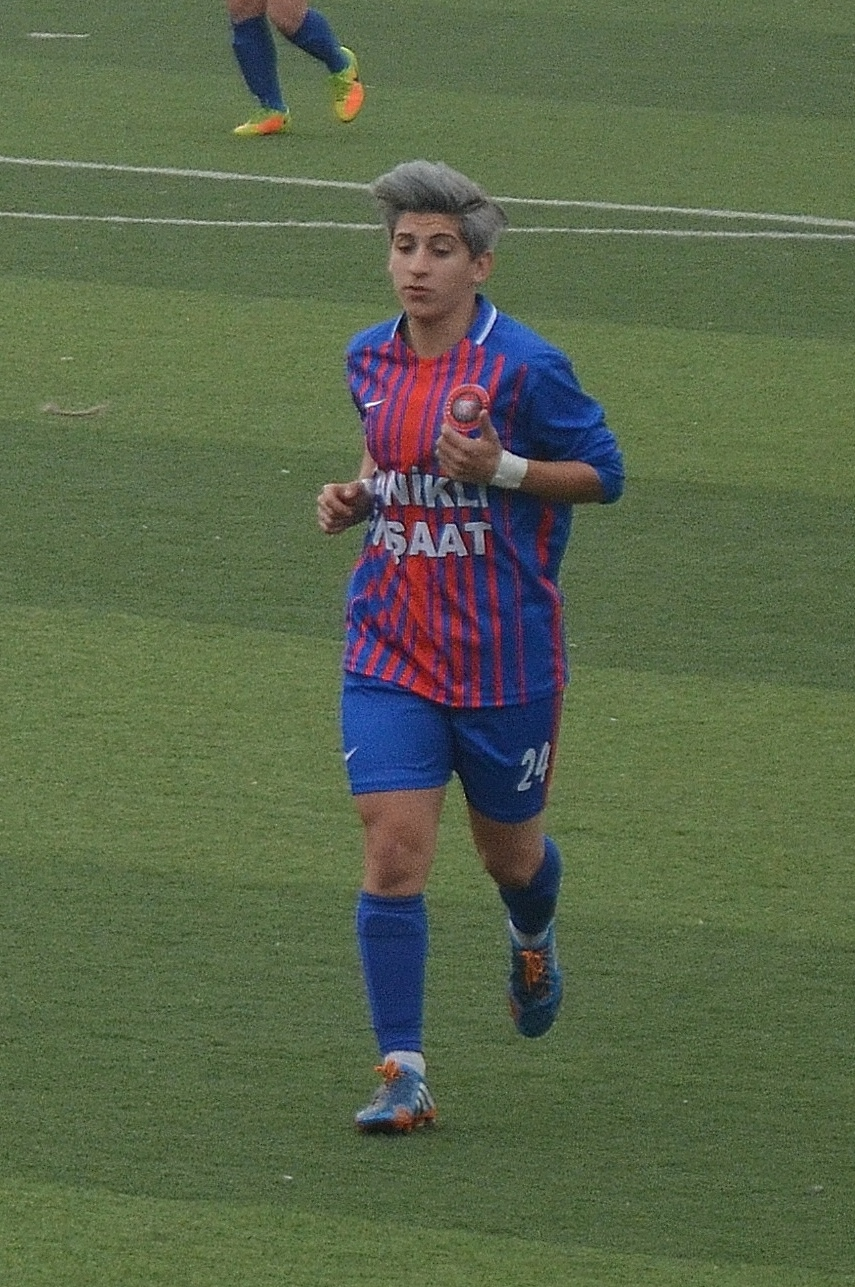
- Parlak with Fatih Vatan Spor in November 2017

Personal information
- Date of birth: 27 May 1993 (age 33)
- Place of birth: Şişli, Istanbul, Turkey
- Position: Midfielder

Team information
- Current team: Çekmeköy BilgiDoğa Spor

Senior career*
Years	Team	Apps	(Gls)
2010–2012	Kireçburnu Spor	17	(16)
2012–2014	Marmara Üniversitesi Spor	24	(7)
2014	Kireçburnu Spor	6	(13)
2014–2016	Fatih Vatan Spor	33	(33)
2016	Ataşehir Belediyespor	6	(0)
2017–2019	Fatih Vatan Spor	26	(13)
2019–2020	Kireçburnu Spor	12	(7)
2020–2021	Piroș Security	15	(9)
2021–2022	Konak Belediyespor	21	(3)
2022–2023	Fenerbahçe	20	(5)
2023–2025	Galatasaray	22	(3)
2025–	Çekmeköy BilgiDoğa Spor	0	(0)

International career^{‡}
2019–	Azerbaijan	12	(0)
- * Club domestic league appearances and goals as of 22:04, 16 July 2023 (UTC) ‡ National team caps and goals as of 2 September 2022

Nazlıcan Parlak (born 27 May 1993) is a footballer who plays as a midfielder for Turkish Women's Super League club Çekmeköy BilgiDoğa Spor. Born in Turkey, she plays for the Azerbaijan women's national team.

== Club career ==
Parlak played for the Romanian club Piroș Security before she returned to Turkey to join Konak Belediyespor to play in the 2021-22 Turkcell Super League.

She signed a one-year contract with Galatasaray on 14 September 2023.

In the statement made by Galatasaray club on July 20, 2025, it was said that we thank you for your efforts and wish you success in your future careers.

== International goals ==
No.	Date	Venue	Opponent	Score	Result	Competition
1.	6 September 2022	Dalga Arena, Baku, Azerbaijan	Bosnia and Herzegovina	1–1	1–1	2023 FIFA Women's World Cup qualification
2.	13 November 2022	Dalga Arena, Baku, Azerbaijan	Croatia	1–0	1–2	Friendly
3.	26 September 2023	DG Arena, Podgorica, Montenegro	Montenegro	1–0	1–0	2023–24 UEFA Women's Nations League
4.	31 October 2023	Dalga Arena, Baku, Azerbaijan	Montenegro	2–0	3–0	2023–24 UEFA Women's Nations League
5.	25 October 2024	Dalga Arena, Baku, Azerbaijan	Portugal	1–3	1–4	UEFA Women's Euro 2025 qualifying play-offs
