= Patricia George =

Nigerian footballer

Personal information
- Full name: Patricia del Carmen George
- Date of birth: 18 December 1996 (age 29)
- Place of birth: Chicago, Illinois, United States
- Height: 1.73 m (5 ft 8 in)
- Position: Forward

Team information
- Current team: Fenerbahçe
- Number: 11

Youth career
- Von Steuben Panthers

College career
Years	Team	Apps	(Gls)
2015–2018	Illinois Fighting Illini	76	(4)

Senior career*
Years	Team	Apps	(Gls)
2020	Cloppenburg	2	(2)
2020–2022	SC Sand	36	(3)
2022–	Fenerbahçe	0	(0)

International career^{‡}
2021–	Nigeria	1	(0)
- * Club domestic league appearances and goals as of 8 May 2022. ‡ National team caps and goals as of 20 February 2021.

Patricia del Carmen George (born 18 December 1996) is a footballer who plays as a forward for Turkish Women's Football Super League club Fenerbahçe SK. Born in the United States, she plays for the Nigeria women's national team.

== Early life ==
George was raised in Chicago, Illinois.

== Club career ==
=== High school and college ===
George has attended the Von Steuben Metropolitan High School in Chicago and the University of Illinois at Urbana–Champaign.

=== In Germany ===
George has played for BV Cloppenburg and SC Sand in Germany.

== International career ==
Through birth and descent, George is eligible to play for the United States, Venezuela or Nigeria. She made her senior debut for the latter on 18 February 2021 as a second-half substitution against Russian club CSKA Moscow at that year edition of the Turkish Women's Cup. Her first appearance facing other national team was two days later against Uzbekistan.
