= Fenerbahçe S.K. (women's football) =

Women's association football club from Turkey

Fenerbahçe
- Full name: Fenerbahçe Spor Kulübü
- Nicknames: Sarı Kanaryalar (The Yellow Canaries); Sarı Lacivertliler (The Yellow-Navy Blues); Efsane (The Legend); Cumhuriyet (The Republic); Dişi Kanaryalar (The Female Canaries)
- Short name: FB; Fener
- Founded: 4 April 1995; 31 years ago (First foundation); 26 August 2021; 5 years ago (Re-foundation)
- Ground: Lefter Küçükandonyadis Stadium; Şükrü Saracoğlu Stadium (selected matches)
- President: Aziz Yıldırım
- Head coach: Gökhan Bozkaya
- League: Super League
- 2025–26: Champions
- Website: fenerbahce.org
Home colours	Away colours	Third colours

Fenerbahçe Spor Kulübü Kadın Futbol Takımı, currently also known as Fenerbahçe arsaVev for sponsorship reasons, is the women's football department of Fenerbahçe S.K., founded originally in 1995, and re-founded in 2021. The team plays in the Turkish Women's Football Super League.

== History ==
=== Foundation of the club ===
Fenerbahçe was founded in 1907 in Istanbul, Ottoman Empire, by Ziya Songülen, Ayetullah Bey and Necip Okaner. The club's name comes from Fenerbahçe, a neighbourhood in Istanbul. The name literally means "lighthouse garden" in Turkish (from fener, meaning "lighthouse", and bahçe, meaning "garden"), referring to a historic lighthouse located at Fenerbahçe Cape.

=== Original establishment ===
==== 1994–95: First season ====
Women's football in Turkey saw the establishment of the Women's League in 1994 with the participation of 12 clubs.

On 4 April 1995, Fenerbahçe S.K. formed their women's football team under the leadershipo of board member Mehmet Ali Aydınlar. The team, managed by Saffet Aktarı and coached by Ziya Özgür, participated at the 1994–95 Women's League. After playing 12 matches, they finished the season with eight wins, two draws and two losses.

==== 1995–96: Second season ====
To strengthen the team, more players were transferred, such as one from Dinarsuspor, three from Acarlar Spor, one from Yenidünya Spor and two expatriates from Romania. The team finished the 1995–96 season playing six matches with five wins and one loss. They scored in total 46 goals, and saw four goals in their net. Some of the more significant matches were when the team played against Ankara Dedeoğlu, winning 20–0, and won against Mersin Camspor with 4–0. The squad consisted of Pervin Sanlı, Zerrin Koldamca, Nevra Selışık, Aycan Çağlar, Pınar Çimdik, Yeter Bayrak, Ana Rosca (ROM), Rebeka Fırıncıyan, Ayşe Oktay, Canan Oğuz, Leyla Ersan, Emine Akyüz, Sibel Cımbız, Seda Tamkan, Sevgi Özder, Füsun Öcal, Adriana Grigore (ROM), Nurdan Bekdemir. Later, the women's branch was shut down for economic reasons.

=== Re-establishment ===
The re-establishment of the women's football branch of Fenerbahçe was announced on 26 August 2021, with the note:

As Fenerbahçe Sports Club, we have accepted it as one of our duties to add value to the society we belong to. Now, as Fenerbahçe, we are taking another important step with this awareness and approach; We are announcing that we will take part in women's football. As Fenerbahce Sports Club, which joined forces with HeForShe to ensure equality between men and women and increase the participation of women and girls in all areas of society, we believe that our Women's Football Team will make our Club proud with championships and will set a good example for future generations.

— Fenerbahçe,

==== 2021–22: First season ====
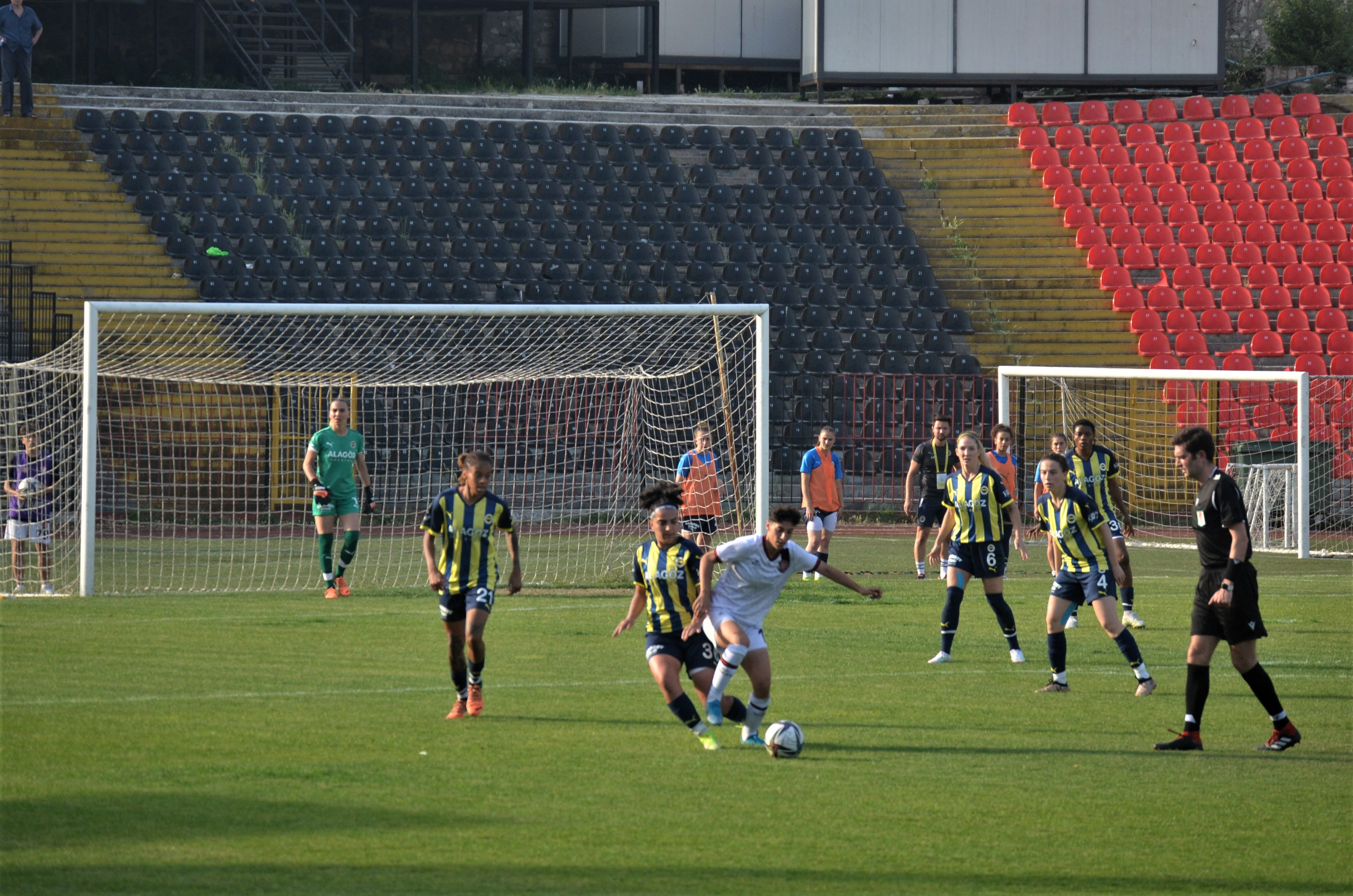
Fenerbahçe women's squad in the away match of the 2021–22 Turkish Women's Football Super League play-off against Fatih Karagümrük women's.

===== First match and derby controversy =====
With a joint statement they made on 2 December 2021, Fenerbahçe and Galatasaray, the two archrivals, announced that they will hold two friendly matches between women's football teams in order to raise social awareness about violence against women. Any match between Fenerbahçe and Galatasaray is one of the biggest events in the country, called the Intercontinental Derby.

The first match was held on 7 December 2021 at Galatasaray's Nef Stadium and was broadcast live all over Turkey. Fenerbahçe left the match with a convincing 7–0 win. After the match, Fenerbahçe vice president Erol Bilecik, who congratulated the Fenerbahçe players in the dressing room, cited the historical 6–0 win of the men's team against Galatasaray on 6 November 2002. His speech sparked controversy, as Galatasaray fans started insulting Bilecik and Fenerbahçe female players and soon announcements were made from both clubs calling for the events to calm down. The second match was cancelled after Galatasaray backed down.

===== Participation in the league =====
After the re-establishment, Fenerbahçe took part in Group A of the 2021–22 Women's Super League in its first season. The team completed its group as the leader and participated in the play-offs with the first 4 teams in the group and eliminated Hakkarigücü SK in the play-off quarter-finals. In the semi-finals, the team was eliminated by Fatih Karagümrük.

As a result of the name sponsorship agreement made with Petrol Ofisi before the 2022–23 season, the name of the team was changed to Fenerbahçe Petrol Ofisi Women's Football Team.

==== 2026–27 ====
===== Champions League qualifiers =====
Having won the 2025–26 Turkish Women's Football Super League, Fenerbahçe started their first ever European campaign in the 2026–27 UEFA Women's Champions League 2nd qualification round. In the mini-tournament, they first faced Ukrainian side FC Metalist 1925 Kharkiv and won 1-2, securing its first ever European win. They subsequently faced the host OH Leuven in the final. After the match ended in a 1-1 draw, Fenerbahçe was eliminated following a peanlty shoutout (4-2), missing the chance to advance to the next qualifying round. Following their elimination, Fenerbahçe continued their campaign in the 2026–27 UEFA Women's Europa Cup.

== Sponsorship names ==
- Fenerbahçe Petrol Ofisi (2022–2025)
- Fenerbahçe ArsaVev (2025–present)

== Stadium ==
The team plays their home matches at the club's Fenerbahçe Lefter Küçükandonyadis Sports Complex, also called as Fenerbahçe Dereağzı Facility in Kadıköy.

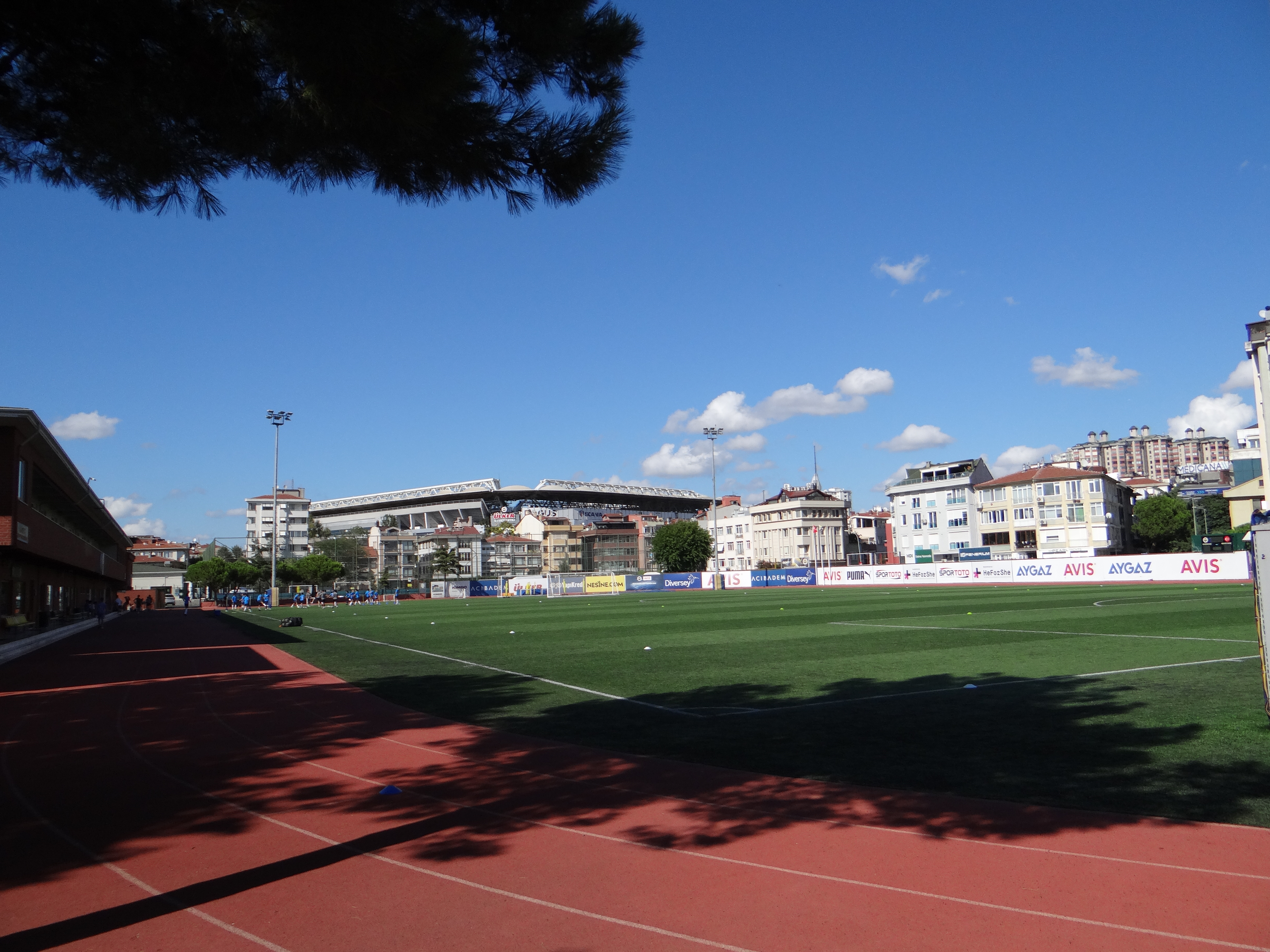
Fenerbahçe Lefter Küçükandonyadis Stadium at Dereağzı, Kadıköy.

Starting with the semi-finals match of the 2022–23 Women's Super League season on 13 May 2024, the ream returned to their initial home ground Fenerbahçe Lefter Küçükandonyadis Stadium at Dereağzı, Kadıköy.

== Statistics ==
As of 14 November 2026

Season	League	Pos. (Gr.)	Play-offs	Pld	W	D	L	GF	GA	GD	Pts.
1994–95	Women's League	2nd (4)	Semifinalist								
1995–96	Women's League	3rd (1)	did not qualify								
2021–22	Super League	1st (A)	Semifinalist	26	20	3	3	110	19	+91	58
2022–23	Super League	3rd (B)	Runners-up	25	15	5	5	80	17	+63	36
2023–24	Super League	3rd	—	30	21	3	6	82	27	+55	66
2024–25	Super League	2nd	—	26	22	2	2	85	11	+74	68
2025–26	Super League	1st	—	30	27	2	1	136	9	+127	83
2026–27	Super League	1st (^{a})	—	9	8	1	0	39	1	+38	25
Green marks a season followed by promotion, red a season followed by relegation.

- (^{a}): Season in progress

== Squad ==
As of 31 August 2026

Note: Flags indicate national team as defined under FIFA eligibility rules; some limited exceptions apply. Players may hold more than one non-FIFA nationality.

No.	Pos.	Nation	Player
2	DF	JAM	Konya Plummer
5	DF	TUR	Yaşam Göksu
6	MF	NGR	Regina Otu
7	DF	CMR	Colette Ndzana
8	MF	TUR	Cansu Gürel
9	MF	TUR	Busem Şeker
10	MF	TUR	Ece Türkoğlu (vice-captain)
11	FW	TUR	Yağmur Uraz (captain)
13	FW	TUR	Zeynep Kerimoğlu
14	DF	NZL	Katie Bowen
16	MF	AZE	Peritan Bozdağ
17	DF	TUR	İpek Kaya

No.	Pos.	Nation	Player
19	MF	TUR	Mesude Alayont
20	MF	PAN	Marta Cox
21	GK	PAR	Soledad Belotto
24	DF	TUR	Fatma Şakar
26	MF	NGR	Suliat Abideen
29	MF	TUR	Mevlüde Okuyan
30	FW	CMR	Divine Manga
55	FW	HUN	Zsanett Kaján
71	GK	MDA	Natalia Munteanu
77	FW	CZE	Andrea Stašková
93	FW	BRA	Maria Alves

== Notable former players ==
- Turkey
  - Berdan Bozkurt
  - İlayda Civelek,
  - Ecem Cumert,
  - Ezgi Çağlar,
  - Meryem Cennet Çal,
  - Sevinç Çorlu,
  - Rebeka Fırıncıyan,
  - Gülbin Hız,
  - Fatma Kara,
  - Safa Merve Nalçacı,
  - Jessica O'Rourke,
  - Sevgi Özder,
  - Ana Rosca,
  - Setenay Sırım,
  - Narin Yakut,
  - Songül Yeşilyurt
- Azerbaijan
  - Nazlıcan Parlak
- Cameroon
  - Genevieve Ngo Mbeleck
- Canada
  - Danielle Steer
- England
  - Shameeka Fishley
- Ghana
  - Alice Kusi,
  - Faustina Adjei Kyeremeh
- Ivory Coast
  - Nina Kpaho
- Latvia
  - Olga Ševcova
- Mali
  - Fatou Dembele
- Morocco
  - Samya Hassani
- Namibia
  - Zenatha Coleman
- New Zealand
  - Jana Radosavljević
- Nigeria
  - Patricia George
- Portugal
  - Mariana Jaleca
- Puerto Rico
  - Danielle Marcano
- ' Slovenia
  - Lara Ivanuša
- Trinidad and Tobago
  - Kennya Cordner
- United States
  - Haley Berg,
  - Erin Yenney

== Staff ==
Position	Staff
Assistant Team Manager	(Turkey) Can Sarı
Administrative Assistant	(Turkey) Semih Bozdoğan
Head Coach	(Turkey) Gökhan Bozkaya
Assistant Coach	(Turkey) Ahmet Dağ
Goalkeeping Coach	(Turkey) Alkan Birlik
Athletic Performance Coach	(Turkey) Engin Sancak
Analysis Coach	(Turkey) Oğuz Yıldırım
Physiotherapist	(Turkey) İrem Karataş
Physiotherapist	(Turkey) Buse İstanbulluoğlu
Masseur	(Turkey) Selim Can Akçe
Media Officer	(Turkey) Ataner Aygür
Interpreter	(Turkey) Semih Deral
Interpreter	(Turkey) Furkan Güzel
Kit Manager	(Turkey) Erkin Sözmen

Last updated: 25 September 2025
Source: Fenerbahce.org

== Coaching history ==
- (Turkey) Nihan Su (2021–22)
- (Turkey) Özkan Beceren (2022–23)
- (Turkey) Serhat Deniz (2023)
- (Turkey) Gökhan Bozkaya (2023–)

== Honours ==
- Women's Super League

Winners (1): 2025–26
Runners-up (2): 2022–23, 2024–25

== International results ==
UEFA Women's Champions League
Event	Stage	Date	Venue	Opponent	Result	Scorers	Ref.
2026–27 UEFA Women's Champions League	Second QR Semi-finals	Aug 5, 2026	(Belgium) Den Dreef, Leuven	(Ukraine) Metalist 1925 Kharkiv	W 2–1	Türkoğlu, Alves	
2026–27 UEFA Women's Champions League	Second QR Final	Aug 8, 2026	(Belgium) Den Dreef, Leuven	(Belgium) OH Leuven	L 1–1 (a.e.t.) (2–4 p)	Plummer	
2026–27 UEFA Women's Europa Cup	Second qualifying round Leg 1	Sep 26, 2026	(Hungary) Wittmann Antal park, Mosonmagyaróvár	(Belarus) FC Minsk	W 4–1	Ngah (2), Stašková , Kaján	
2026–27 UEFA Women's Europa Cup	Second qualifying round Leg 2	Sep 30, 2026	(Turkey) Yusuf Ziya Öniş Stadium, Istanbul	(Belarus) FC Minsk	W 1–0	Şeker	
2026–27 UEFA Women's Europa Cup	Round of 16 Leg 1	Oct 28, 2026	(Spain) Estadio Zubieta, San Sebastian	(Spain) Real Sociedad	L 0–2		
2026–27 UEFA Women's Europa Cup	Round of 16 Leg 2	Nov 11, 2026	(Turkey) Şükrü Saracoğlu Stadium, Istanbul	(Spain) Real Sociedad	L 0–2		

== Kit history ==
2021–22 home	2021–22 away	2021–22 alt	2022–23 home	2022–23 away	2022–23 alt

== Squad history ==
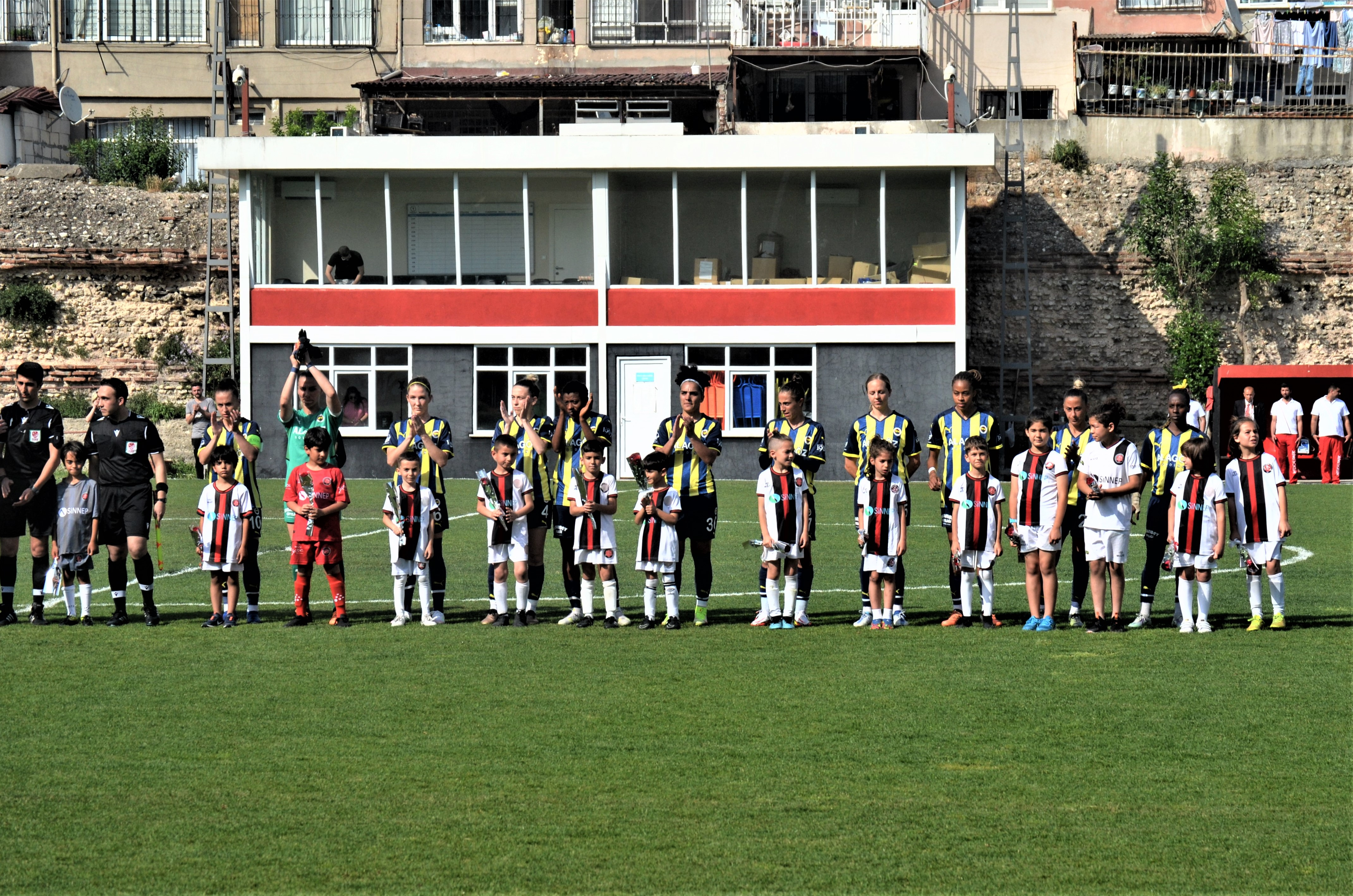
Fenerbahçe women's squad in the away match of the 2021–22 Turkish Women's Football Super League play-off against Fatih Karagümrük women's.
