= Yuliya Shevchuk =

Ukrainian association football player

Personal information
- Full name: Yuliya Volodymyrivna Shevchuk'
- Date of birth: 25 June 1998 (age 28)
- Place of birth: Kivertsi, Ukraine
- Position: Midfielder

Team information
- Current team: Ankara BB Fomget GS
- Number: 55

Youth career
- 2014-2015: Rodyna-Lyceum

Senior career*
| Years | Team | Apps | (Gls) |
| 2016-2021 | WFC Zhytlobud-1 Kharkiv | | |
| 2022– | Ankara BB Fomget GS | 14 | (9) |

International career
- Ukraine U17
- Ukraine U19
| 2016– | Ukraine | | |
- * Club domestic league appearances and goals as of 5 November 2022

Yuliya Volodymyrivna Shevchuk (Ukrainian: Шевчук Юлія Володимирівна; born 25 June 1998) is a Ukrainian footballer, who plays as a midfielder for Ankara BB Fomget GS in the Turkish Women's Football Super League , and for the Ukraine women's national team.

== Private lisfe ==
Yuliya Volodymyrivna Shevchuk was born in Kivertsi, Ukraine on 25 June 20–1998.

== Club career ==
She played football in the Manevychi-based women's football club Osvita-Volynyanka. In 2014, she joined the Rodyna-Lyceum in Kostopil, where she played for two seasons.

She became a member of WFC Zhytlobud-1 Kharkiv in 2016. She made her European Cup debut on 23 August the same year in a match of the 2016–17 UEFA Women's Champions League qualifying round against the SFK Rīga from Latvia.

In March 2022, she moved to Turkey, and signed with Ankara BB Fomget GS to play in the Women's Super League.

== International career ==
She was a member of the Ukraine U17 and U19 teams, before she was admitted to the A team. On 19 October 2016, she made her debut in the national team in a friendly match with the Hungarian national team.
