= 2022–23 Turkish Women's Football Super League =

Turkish Women's Football Super League
- Season: 2022–23
- Dates: Group matches: 16 October 2022 – 19 March 2023; Play-off matches: 25 April – 2 June 2023
- Champions: Ankara BB FOMGET
- Relegated: Dudullu; Kireçburnu
- Champions League: Ankara BB FOMGET
- Matches: 193
- Goals: 717 (3.72 per match)
- Top goalscorer: Yağmur Uraz (26 goals)
- Biggest home win: Fenerbahçe 18–0 Kireçburnu (18 January 2023)
- Biggest away win: Kireçburnu 0–13 Galatasaray (12 March 2023)
- Highest scoring: Fenerbahçe 18–0 Kireçburnu (18 January 2023)
- Longest winning run: Ankara BB FOMGET (10)
- Longest unbeaten run: Ankara BB FOMGET (17)
- Longest winless run: Kireçburnu (22)
- Longest losing run: Kireçburnu (22)

The 2022–23 Turkish Women's Football Super League (Turkish: Turkcell Kadın Futbol Süper Ligi 2022–2023 Sezonu) was the 27th season of Turkey's top women's football league.

A total of 19 teams, which played in the 2021–22 Women's Super League season, competed in two groups. The league group matches started on 16 October 2022 and ended on 19 March 2023, having a half-season break between 18 December 2022 and 8 January 2023. Play-off matches started on 25 April 2023 and ended on 2 June 2023.

== Teams ==
Location of teams in Turkey in the 2022–23 season of Turkish Women's Football Super League
Location of teams in Istanbul in the 2022–23 season of Turkish Women's Football Super League

Season 2022–23
Team	Hometown	Ground	Capacity	2021–22 finish
1207 Antalya Spor	Antalya	Zeytinköy Stadium's Field #3		—
Adana İdmanyurduspor	Adana	Gençlik Stadium	2,000	—
ALG Spor	Gaziantep	Batur Stadium		champion
Altay	İzmir	Alsancak Mustafa Denizli Stadium	14,000	—
Amed Sportif Faaliyetler	Diyarbakır	Talaytepe Sports Facility		—
Ataşehir Belediyespor	Istanbul	Yeni Sahra Stadium	700	—
Beşiktaş J.K.	Istanbul	İsmet İnönü Stadium	800	4th
Dudullu Spor	Istanbul	Dudullu Stadium		—
Fatih Karagümrük S.K.	Istanbul	Vefa Stadium	5,500	runner-up
Fatih Vatan Spor	Istanbul	Fatih Mimar Sinan Stadium		—
Fenerbahçe S.K.	Istanbul	Beylerbeyi 75. Yıl Stadium	5,500	3rd
Ankara BB Fomget GS	Ankara	Batıkent Stadium		—
Galatasaray S.K.	Istanbul	Florya Metin Oktay Facilities		—
Hakkarigücü Spor	Hakkari	Merzan City Football Field		—
Hatayspor	Hatay	Defne Atatürk Stadium		—
Kdz. Ereğlispor	Karadeniz Ereğli	Beyçayir Football Field		—
Kireçburnu Spor	Istanbul	Çayırbaşı Stadium	5,000	—
Konak Belediyespor	İzmir	Atatürk Stadyum 1 no'lu Yan Saha		—
Trabzonspor	Trabzon	Mehmet Ali Yılmaz Stadium	3,000	—

== Qualifying stage ==
=== Group A ===
Pos	Team	Pld	W	D	L	GF	GA	GD	Pts	Qualification or relegation	ALG	FKA	FVA	BJK	KDZ	HAT	HAK	DUD	ALT
1	ALG	16	13	2	1	49	12	+37	41	Quarterfinals	—	2–1	3–0	2–1	2–0	3–3	0–0	3–0	3–0
2	Fatih Karagümrük	16	10	3	3	40	10	+30	33	First round	2–3	—	2–1	1–1	2–0	3–0	6–0	2–1	9–0
3	Fatih Vatan	16	7	4	5	22	18	+4	25	First round	1–2	0–4	—	1–0	0–0	2–1	1–1	4–1	3–0
4	Beşiktaş	16	6	6	4	33	18	+15	24	First round	1–3	0–1	4–2	—	3–0	3–1	2–2	4–0	3–0
5	Kdz. Ereğli Bld.	16	7	3	6	20	18	+2	24	First round	0–4	1–1	0–1	1–1	—	4–1	0–1	1–0	3–0
6	Hatayspor (Note: Hatayspor withdrew from the league, following the 2023 Turkey–Syria earthquake, and were not relegated at the end of the season.)	16	7	3	6	24	24	0	24	First round	3–2	1–0	0–0	1–1	0–3	—	1–0	2–0	3–1
7	Hakkarigücü	16	5	7	4	18	18	0	22	First round	0–3	0–0	0–0	2–2	1–2	1–0	—	3–0	3–0
8	Dudullu (Note: Dudullu had 3 points deducted.) (R)	16	2	2	12	10	36	−26	5	Play-out	0–4	0–3	0–3	1–1	0–1	1–4	1–1	—	3–0
9	Altay (Note: Altay had 3 points deducted. Withdrawn from league due to financial issues after season of first half.)	16	0	0	16	2	64	−62	−3	Withdrawn	0–10	0–3	0–3	0–6	1–4	0–3	0–3	0–2	—

Source: TFF.org
(R) Relegated

=== Group B ===
Pos	Team	Pld	W	D	L	GF	GA	GD	Pts	Qualification or relegation	GAL	FOM	FEN	AMD	ANT	ATA	KON	TRA	ADA	KIR
1	Galatasaray	18	17	0	1	84	9	+75	51	Quarterfinals	—	4–0	2–0	4–2	5–0	5–0	5–0	1–0	3–0	13–1
2	Ankara BB FOMGET (C)	18	16	1	1	65	11	+54	49	First round	1–0	—	1–0	1–0	4–1	7–2	2–1	3–1	3–0	15–1
3	Fenerbahçe	18	11	3	4	66	10	+56	36	First round	2–3	1–1	—	4–0	5–0	7–0	8–0	1–0	1–0	18–0
4	Amed	18	8	4	6	31	22	+9	28	First round	0–3	0–1	1–0	—	0–1	3–3	1–1	2–1	3–0	3–0
5	1207 Antalyaspor	18	7	4	7	32	25	+7	25	First round	0–2	0–2	1–1	0–0	—	0–0	1–1	1–2	3–0	13–0
6	Ataşehir Bld.	18	6	3	9	35	51	−16	21	First round	0–9	0–2	0–6	1–2	0–3	—	1–0	2–0	2–2	5–2
7	Konak Bld.	18	6	2	10	32	39	−7	20	First round	1–3	0–7	0–3	0–1	2–0	3–1	—	3–2	4–0	12–0
8	Trabzonspor (O)	18	5	2	11	27	29	−2	17	Play-out	2–6	0–2	0–0	1–1	0–3	0–2	3–1	—	1–0	11–0
9	Adana İdmanyurdu (Note: Adana İdmanyurdu withdrew from the league, following the 2023 Turkey–Syria earthquake, and were not relegated at the end of the season.)	18	4	1	13	20	37	−17	13		0–3	0–2	0–4	0–3	0–1	0–3	1–0	1–0	—	2–1
10	Kireçburnu (Note: Kireçburnu had 3 points deducted.) (R)	18	0	0	18	8	167	−159	−3	Play-out	0–13	0–11	1–5	1–9	1–4	0–13	0–3	0–3	0–14	—

Source: TFF.org
(C) Champions; (O) Play-out winner; (R) Relegated

== Knockout stage ==
=== Play–outs ===
The play-out round was held in a 3-team league format. The team that takes the first place in the table at the end of the round will compete in the 2023–24 Super League season.

Pos	Team	Pld	W	D	L	GF	GA	GD	Pts	Qualification or relegation	TRA	DUD	KIR
1	Trabzonspor (O)	4	3	0	1	10	1	+9	9	Super League	—	4–0	3–0
2	Dudullu (R)	4	3	0	1	7	4	+3	9	Relegation	1–0	—	3–0
3	Kireçburnu (R)	4	0	0	4	0	12	−12	0	Relegation	0–3	0–3	—

Source: TFF.org
(O) Play-out winner; (R) Relegated

Matches

25 April 2023	Trabzonspor	3–0	Kireçburnu	Trabzon
12:00 TRT (UTC+3)		Report		Stadium: Kadir Özcan Facility; Referee: Nurhak İbili
Note: Kireçburnu forfeited the match, with Trabzonspor being awarded a 3–0 win.

29 April 2023	Dudullu	1–0	Trabzonspor	Istanbul
14:00 TRT (UTC+3)	Beceren 90+7'	Report		Stadium: Dudullu Stadium; Referee: Hatice Aydın

3 May 2023	Kireçburnu	0–3	Dudullu	Istanbul
12:00 TRT (UTC+3)		Report		Stadium: Çayırbaşı Stadium; Referee: Emine Öz

7 May 2023	Kireçburnu	0–3	Trabzonspor	Istanbul
12:00 TRT (UTC+3)		Report		Stadium: Çayırbaşı Stadium

7 May 2023	Trabzonspor	4–0	Dudullu	Trabzon
12:00 TRT (UTC+3)	Mfwamba 22'; Hajiyeva 36'; Özkan 75', 95'	Report		Stadium: Kadir Özcan Facility; Referee: Mehmet Zait Sadan

20 May 2023	Dudullu	3–0	Kireçburnu	Istanbul
14:00 TRT (UTC+3)		Report		Stadium: Dudullu Stadium

=== Play–offs ===
==== Bracket ====
First round
A4	Beşiktaş	4	3	7
B5	1207 Antalyaspor	0	0	0
B2	Ankara BB FOMGET	1	5	6
A7	Hakkarigücü	2	0	2
A3	Fatih Vatan	6	5	11
B6	Ataşehir Bld.	0	0	0
B4	Amed (a.e.t.)	1	1	2
A5	Kdz. Ereğli Bld.	1	0	1
A2	Fatih Karagümrük	4	5	9
B7	Konak Bld.	0	0	0
B3	Fenerbahçe	3	3	6
A6	Hatayspor	0	0	0

Quarterfinals
A1	ALG	1	3	4
A4	Beşiktaş	1	0	1
B2	Ankara BB FOMGET	0	4	4
A3	Fatih Vatan	0	0	0
B1	Galatasaray	5	3	8
B4	Amed	1	0	1
A2	Fatih Karagümrük	0	1	1
B3	Fenerbahçe	1	1	2

Semifinals
A1	ALG	1	1	2
B2	Ankara BB FOMGET	3	0	3
B1	Galatasaray	0	2	2
B3	Fenerbahçe	2	2	4

Final
B2	Ankara BB FOMGET (a.e.t.)	4
B3	Fenerbahçe	2

==== First round ====
Team 1	Agg.	Team 2	1st leg	2nd leg
Konak Belediyespor	0–9	Fatih Karagümrük	0–4	0–5
Ataşehir Belediyespor	0–11	Fatih Vatan Spor	0–6	0–5
1207 Antalya Spor	0–7	Beşiktaş	0–4	0–3
Hakkarigücü	2–6	FOMGET	2–1	0–5
Hatayspor	0–6	Fenerbahçe	0–3	0–3
Kdz. Ereğli Belediye Spor	1–2	Amed	1–1	0–1 (a.e.t.)

First leg

25 April 2023	Konak Belediyespor	0–4	Fatih Karagümrük	İzmir
12:00 TRT (UTC+3)		Report	Chilufya 15', 60'; Mashina 74'; Traoré 90'	Stadium: Atatürk 1 Nolu Yan Saha; Referee: Salih Taştepe

25 April 2023	Ataşehir Belediyespor	0–6	Fatih Vatan Spor	Istanbul
12:00 TRT (UTC+3)		Report	Demirdögen 16'; Čubrilo 45+2'; Ataş 61'; Kaya 84'; Okyere 87'; Koyun 90'	Stadium: İBB Esatpaşa Stadium; Referee: Aslı Köse Güllüdere

25 April 2023	1207 Antalya Spor	0–4	Beşiktaş	Antalya
12:00 TRT (UTC+3)		Report	Kozyrenko 7'; Pereviznyk 71', 77'; Koçer 90+3' (pen.)	Stadium: Zeytinköy Stadium; Referee: Mehmet Furkan Balbay

25 April 2023	Hakkarigücü	2–1	FOMGET	Hakkari
12:00 TRT (UTC+3)	Zulu 67'; Nana 78'	Report	İçinözbebek 61'	Stadium: Merzan Stadium; Referee: Muhammed Sevim

Hatayspor	0–3	Fenerbahçe	Hatay
	Report
Note: Hatayspor withdrew from the league due to the 2023 Turkey–Syria earthquake and Fenerbahçe, therefore, were awarded a 3–0 win.

25 April 2023	Kdz. Ereğli Belediye Spor	1–1	Amed	Zonguldak
12:00 TRT (UTC+3)	Bozyel 5'	Report	Benie 59'	Stadium: Şehit Vefa Karakurdu Stadium; Referee: Nihat Hartlı

Second leg

29 April 2023	Fatih Karagümrük	5–0	Konak Belediyespor	Istanbul
12:00 TRT (UTC+3)	Akaffou 23'; Mashina 50'; Traoré 73'; Keskin 84'; Chilufya 90+3'	Report		Stadium: Vefa Stadium; Referee: Sema Süer

29 April 2023	Fatih Vatan Spor	5–0	Ataşehir Belediyespor	Istanbul
12:00 TRT (UTC+3)	Demirdögen 4'; Ataş 6'; Eren 19'; Gültekin 47'; Čubrilo 80'	Report		Stadium: Fatih Mimar Sinan Stadium; Referee: Mete Aylıoğlu

29 April 2023	FOMGET	5–0	Hakkarigücü	Ankara
12:00 TRT (UTC+3)	Kuč 7', 47', 60'; Ovdiychuk 45+4'; Derkach 87'	Report		Stadium: Osmanlı Stadium; Referee: Kerim Çataklı

Fenerbahçe	3–0	Hatayspor	Istanbul
	Report
Note: Hatayspor withdrew from the league due to the 2023 Turkey–Syria earthquake and Fenerbahçe, therefore, were awarded a 3–0 win.

29 April 2023	Amed	1–0 (a.e.t.)	Kdz. Ereğli Belediye Spor	Diyarbakır
12:00 TRT (UTC+3)	Hajiyeva 120+1'	Report		Stadium: Amedspor Facility; Referee: Olcay Yıldırım

29 April 2023	Beşiktaş	3–0	1207 Antalya Spor	Istanbul
13:00 TRT (UTC+3)		Report		Stadium: Fulya Hakkı Yeten Facility; Referee: Damla Doğan Genç

==== Quarterfinals ====
Team 1	Agg.	Team 2	1st leg	2nd leg
Beşiktaş	1–4	ALG	1–1	0–3
Fenerbahçe	2–1	Fatih Karagümrük	1–0	1–1
Amed	1–8	Galatasaray	1–5	0–3
Fatih Vatan	0–4	Ankara BB FOMGET	0–0	0–4

First leg

3 May 2023	Amed	1–5	Galatasaray	Diyarbakır
12:00 TRT (UTC+3)	Benie 36'	Report	Topçu 20', 73'; Sadıkoğlu 55'; Uraz 66', 77'	Stadium: Amedspor Facility; Referee: Enes Ahi

3 May 2023	Fatih Vatan	0–0	Ankara BB FOMGET	Istanbul
12:00 TRT (UTC+3)		Report		Stadium: Fatih Mimar Sinan Stadium; Referee: Sema Süer

3 May 2023	Beşiktaş	1–1	ALG	Istanbul
14:00 TRT (UTC+3)	Manya 36'	Report	Karataş 65' (pen.)	Stadium: Fulya Hakkı Yeten Facility; Referee: Kadir Yılmaz

3 May 2023	Fenerbahçe	1–0	Fatih Karagümrük	Istanbul
15:00 TRT (UTC+3)	Kusi 67'	Report		Stadium: Beylerbeyi 75. Yıl Stadium; Referee: Mustafa Gökhan Keskin

Second leg

7 May 2023	Galatasaray	3–0	Amed	Istanbul
12:00 TRT (UTC+3)	Santos 21'; Bakarandze 53'; Uraz 84'	Report		Stadium: Florya Metin Oktay Facilities; Referee: Mert Aylıoğlu

7 May 2023	Ankara BB FOMGET	4–0	Fatih Vatan	Ankara
14:00 TRT (UTC+3)	Shevchuk 18'; Kuč 30'; Apanashchenko 77'; Ovdiychuk 90+6'	Report		Stadium: Osmanlı Stadium; Referee: Can Durgut

7 May 2023	ALG	3–0	Beşiktaş	Gaziantep
15:00 TRT (UTC+3)	Kipoyi 36'; Karabulut 45+8'; Bella 90+2'	Report		Stadium: Gaziantep Stadium; Referee: Alkan Parsak

7 May 2023	Fatih Karagümrük	1–1	Fenerbahçe	Istanbul
15:00 TRT (UTC+3)	Chilufya 51'	Report	Coleman 38'	Stadium: Vefa Stadium; Referee: Mete Aylıoğlı

==== Semifinals ====
Team 1	Agg.	Team 2	1st leg	2nd leg
Ankara BB FOMGET	3–2	ALG	3–1	0–1
Fenerbahçe	4–2	Galatasaray	2–0	2–2

First leg

13 May 2023	Fenerbahçe	2–0	Galatasaray	Istanbul
15:00 TRT (UTC+3)	Marcano 2'; Kusi 62'	Report		Stadium: Dereağzı Lefter Küçükandonyadis Facilities; Referee: Melis Özçiğdem

13 May 2023	Ankara BB FOMGET	3–1	ALG	Ankara
15:00 TRT (UTC+3)	Ovdiychuk 30', 90+5'; Kuč 65'	Report	Rith 52'	Stadium: Osmanlı Stadium; Referee: Neslihan Muratdağ

Second leg

20 May 2023	Galatasaray	2–2	Fenerbahçe	Istanbul
12:00 TRT (UTC+3)	Topçu 56' (pen.); Yeniçeri 85'	Report	Marcano 1'; Coleman 90+4' (pen.)	Stadium: Florya Metin Oktay Facilities; Referee: Gamze Durmuş Pakkan

20 May 2023	ALG	1–0	Ankara BB FOMGET	Gaziantep
15:00 TRT (UTC+3)	Houij 64'	Report		Stadium: Gaziantep Stadium; Referee: Melis Özçiğdem

==== Final ====
2 June 2023
20:00 TRT

Ankara BB FOMGET	4–2 (a.e.t.)	Fenerbahçe
Apanashchenko 90+8' (pen.); Kuč 96', 107', 114'	Report	Coleman 9' (pen.), 109'

Alsancak Mustafa Denizli Stadium, İzmir
Referee: Cansu Tiryaki

== Top goalscorers ==
As of 18 March 2023.

Rank	Player	Team	GS	Pld	AG
1	(Turkey) Yağmur Uraz	Galatasaray S.K.	23	17	1.35
2	(Ukraine) Daryna Apanashchenko	Ankara BB Fomget G.S.K.	17	17	1
3	(Turkey) Ebru Topçu	Galatasaray S.K.	14	18	0.78
3	(Ukraine) Olha Ovdiychuk	Ankara BB Fomget G.S.K.	14	18	0.78
5	(Turkey) Busem Şeker	Fenerbahçe S.K.	13	14	0.93

== Hat-tricks and more ==
As of 29 April 2023.

Player	Scored	For	Against	Result	Date	Ref.
(Colombia) Lina Martínez	3	Konak Belediyespor	Adana İdmanyurduspor	4–0	23 October 2022	
(Georgia (country)) Teona Bakradze	5	Amed S. F.K.	Kireçburnu Spor	9–1	23 October 2022	
(Mali) Saratou Traoré	4	Fatih Karagümrük S.K.	Altay S.K.	9–0	6 November 2022	
(Turkey) Kezban Tağ	3	ALG Spor	Altay S.K.	10–0	20 November 2022	
(Turkey) Ecem Cumert	3	Fenerbahçe S.K.	Kireçburnu Spor	5–1	20 November 2022	
(Ukraine) Olha Ovdiychuk	3	Ankara BB Fomget GS	Kireçburnu Spor	15–1	26 November 2022	
(Ukraine) Daryna Apanashchenko	6	Ankara BB Fomget GS	Kireçburnu Spor	15–1	26 November 2022	
(Trinidad and Tobago) Kennya Cordner	3	Fenerbahçe S.K.	Ataşehir Belediyespor	7–0	26 November 2022	
(Turkey) Yağmur Uraz	5	Galatasaray S.K.	Kireçburnu Spor	13–0	11 December 2022	
(Turkey) Birgül Sadıkoğlu	3	Galatasaray S.K.	Kireçburnu Spor	13–0	11 December 2022	
(Ghana) Gifty Assifuah	4	1207 Antalya Spor	Kireçburnu Spor	4–1	18 December 2022	
(Turkey) Neslihan Demirdögen	3	Hatayspor	ALG Spor	3–2	8 January 2023	
(Nigeria) Cynthia Aku	4	Ataşehir Belediyespor	Kireçburnu Spor	13–0	8 January 2023	
(Turkey) Sultan Demirci	4	Ataşehir Belediyespor	Kireçburnu Spor	13–0	8 January 2023	
(Cameroon) Berthe Andiolo	6	Adana İdman Yurdu	Kireçburnu Spor	14–0	18 January 2023	
(Turkey) Büşra Işıl Canoruç	3	Adana İdman Yurdu	Kireçburnu Spor	14–0	18 January 2023	
(Namibia) Zenatha Coleman	3	Fenerbahçe S.K.	Konak Belediyespor	8–0	18 January 2023	
(Turkey) Zeynep Ela Kara	4	Konak Belediyespor	Kireçburnu Spor	12–0	22 January 2023	
(Turkey) Funda Aydınalp	3	Konak Belediyespor	Kireçburnu Spor	12–0	22 January 2023	
(Turkey) Busem Şeker	5	Fenerbahçe S.K.	Kireçburnu Spor	18–0	28 January 2023	
(Turkey) Yaşam Göksu	3	Fenerbahçe S.K.	Kireçburnu Spor	18–0	28 January 2023	
(Turkey) Setenay Sırım	4	Fenerbahçe S.K.	Kireçburnu Spor	18–0	28 January 2023	
(Russia) Natalia Mashina	3	Fatih Karagümrük S.K.	Hakkarigücü Spor	6–0	29 January 2023	
(Ukraine) Daryna Apanashchenko	3	Ankara BB Fomget GS	Kireçburnu Spor	11–0	5 February 2023	
(Montenegro) Armisa Kuč	3	Ankara BB Fomget GS	Kireçburnu Spor	11–0	5 February 2023	
(Turkey) Busem Şeker	3	Fenerbahçe S.K.	Ataşehir Belediyespor	6–0	5 February 2023	
(Turkey) Birgül Sadıkoğlu	3	Galatasaray S.K.	Konak Belediyespor	5–0	5 March 2023	
(Greece) Maria Baska	3	Trabzonspor	Kireçburnu Spor	11–0	5 March 2023	
(Turkey) Nursel Özkan	3	Trabzonspor	Kireçburnu Spor	11–0	5 March 2023	
(Turkey) Yağmur Uraz	5	Galatasaray S.K.	Kireçburnu Spor	13–0	12 March 2023	
(Republic of the Congo) Naomie Kabakaba	5	Galatasaray S.K.	Kireçburnu Spor	13–0	12 March 2023	
(Ghana) Gifty Assifuah	4	1207 Antalya Spor	Kireçburnu Spor	13–0	18 March 2023	
(Montenegro) Armisa Kuč	3	Ankara BB Fomget GS	Hakkarigücü Spor	5–0	29 April 2023	
