= 2026–27 Fenerbahçe S.K. (women's football) season =

Fenerbahçe
2026–27 season
- President: Aziz Yıldırım
- Head coach: Gökhan Bozkaya
- Stadium: Lefter Küçükandonyadis Stadium; Şükrü Saracoğlu Stadium (selected matches)
- Turkish Women's Football Super League: 1ST
- UEFA Women's Champions League: Second qualifying round
- UEFA Women's Europa Cup: Round of 16
- Top goalscorer: League: Stašková (7); All: Stašková (8)
Home colours	Away colours	Third colours
- All statistics correct as of 14 November 2026.

The 2026–27 season will be the 6th season in the existence of Fenerbahçe S.K. women's football team and the club's sixth consecutive season in the top flight of Turkish football.

== Kits ==
Fenerbahçe's 2026–27 kits, manufactured by Adidas, were unveiled on 3 June 2026 and went on sale on the same day. Former men's players Gökhan Gönül, Semih Şentürk, Tuncay Şanlı, Mehmet Aurélio, Elvir Bolić, Ogün Temizkanoğlu, Şenol Çorlu, Cem Pamiroğlu, Alpaslan Eradlı and Cemil Turan participated as models in the event.

The 2026–27 kits feature the club's 120th anniversary crest. The collection brings together Fenerbahçe's iconic Çubuklu (striped) home kit, the away kit reflecting the club's noble spirit and a third kit inspired by the General Harington Cup victory. The Çubuklu jersey, embodying the spirit of the club's 120th anniversary, makes a strong reference to Fenerbahçe's historical heritage through its chest sponsor detail framed in white, while presenting its classic design language with a modern interpretation on the pitch.

The away kit features the Adidas Originals logo for the first time in Fenerbahçe's history.

- Supplier: adidas
- Main sponsor: arsaVev
- Side sponsor: —
- Back sponsor: —
- Sleeve sponsor: —
- Short sponsor: —

Home
Home alt.
Away
Third
Goalkeeper 1
Goalkeeper 2
Goalkeeper 3

== Squad ==
No.	Pos.	Nat.	Player	Since	Date of birth (Age)	Signed from
Goalkeepers
21	GK	(Paraguay)	Soledad Belotto	2026	14 August 2003 (age 23)	(Spain) Alhama
71	GK	(Moldova)	Natalia Munteanu	2024	1 December 1993 (age 32)	(Romania) CS Gloria Bistrița
Defenders
2	DF	(Jamaica)	Konya Plummer	2024	2 August 1997 (age 29)	(Mexico) Tigres UANL
5	DF	(Turkey)	Yaşam Göksu	2022	25 September 1995 (age 31)	(Turkey) Konak Belediyespor
7	DF	(Cameroon)	Colette Ndzana	2026	19 July 2000 (age 26)	(France) Dijon
14	DF	(New Zealand)	Katie Bowen	2026	15 April 1994 (age 32)	(Italy) Inter Milan
17	DF	(Turkey)	İpek Kaya	2023	28 October 1994 (age 32)	(France) ASJ Soyaux-Charente
24	DF	(Turkey)	Fatma Şakar	2026	16 March 1999 (age 27)	(Germany) 1. FC Union Berlin
Midfielders
6	MF	(Nigeria)	Regina Otu	2024	5 August 1996 (age 30)	(France) Saint-Étienne
8	MF	(Turkey)	Cansu Gürel	2022	30 January 2002 (age 24)	(Turkey) Konak Belediyespor
9	MF	(Turkey)	Busem Şeker	2022	19 July 1998 (age 28)	(Turkey) Konak Belediyespor
10	MF	(Turkey)	Ece Türkoğlu (vice-captain)	2023	14 April 1999 (age 27)	(United States) Old Dominion Monarchs
16	MF	(Azerbaijan)	Peritan Bozdağ	2025	15 June 1999 (age 27)	(Turkey) Fatih Vatan
19	MF	(Turkey)	Mesude Alayont	2023	1 January 2003 (age 23)	(Turkey) Beşiktaş
20	MF	(Panama)	Marta Cox	2025	20 July 1997 (age 29)	(Mexico) Club Tijuana
26	MF	(Nigeria)	Suliat Abideen	2026	3 December 2001 (age 24)	(Turkey) Ankara BB Fomget
29	MF	(Turkey)	Mevlüde Okuyan	2023	29 November 2008 (age 17)	(Turkey) Hatayspor
Forwards
11	FW	(Turkey)	Yağmur Uraz (captain)	2023	19 February 1990 (age 36)	(Turkey) Galatasaray
13	FW	(Turkey)	Zeynep Kerimoğlu	2022	13 May 2003 (age 23)	(Turkey) Beşiktaş
30	FW	(Cameroon)	Divine Manga	2026	20 October 2002 (age 24)	(Turkey) Galatasaray
55	FW	(Hungary)	Zsanett Kaján	2026	16 September 1997 (age 29)	(Italy) Parma
77	FW	(Czech Republic)	Andrea Stašková	2025	12 May 2000 (age 26)	(Turkey) Galatasaray
93	FW	(Brazil)	Maria Alves	2026	7 July 1993 (age 33)	(Turkey) Ankara BB Fomget

- Last updated: 2 August 2026
- Source: Fenerbahce.org

=== Academy players ===
No.	Pos.	Nat.	Player	Date of birth (Age)
Goalkeepers
40	GK	(Turkey)	İlayda Demir	20 August 2009 (age 17)
Defenders
33	DF	(Turkey)	Esmanur Teke	4 September 2009 (age 17)
38	DF	(Turkey)	Edanur Gökçe	6 July 2008 (age 18)
Midfielders
32	MF	(Turkey)	İdil Nas Acar	28 April 2009 (age 17)
34	MF	(Turkey)	Belinay Tuğla	3 May 2010 (age 16)
35	MF	(Turkey)	Rabia Akbaba	18 February 2009 (age 17)

== Transfers ==
=== In ===
No.	Pos.	Nat.	Player	Moving from	Date	Source
Summer
24	DF	(Turkey)	Fatma Şakar	(Germany) 1. FC Union Berlin	18 July 2026	
26	MF	(Nigeria)	Suliat Abideen	(Turkey) Ankara BB Fomget	19 July 2026	
30	FW	(Cameroon)	Divine Manga	(Turkey) Galatasaray	20 July 2026	
14	DF	(New Zealand)	Katie Bowen	(Italy) Inter Milan	22 July 2026	
21	GK	(Paraguay)	Soledad Belotto	(Spain) Alhama	27 July 2026	
55	FW	(Hungary)	Zsanett Kaján	(Italy) Parma	2 August 2026	
7	DF	(Cameroon)	Colette Ndzana	(France) Dijon	31 August 2026	

=== Out ===
No.	Pos.	Nat.	Player	Moving to	Date	Source
Summer
21	GK	(Turkey)	Göknur Güleryüz	(France) Toulouse	25 June 2026	
24	FW	(Democratic Republic of the Congo)	Olga Massombo	(Italy) Napoli	25 June 2026	
31	FW	(Belarus)	Karina Olkhovik	(Turkey) Ankara BB Fomget	25 June 2026	
99	FW	(Costa Rica)	María Paula Salas	(France) Montpellier	26 June 2026	
95	DF	(Ivory Coast)	Mariam Diakité	(France) Toulouse	26 June 2026	
7	FW	(United States)	Elena Gracinda Santos		26 June 2026	
18	DF	(Belgium)	Zoë Van Eynde	(Netherlands) AZ	29 June 2026	
25	GK	(Turkey)	Zeynep Akdeniz	(Turkey) Trabzonspor	5 July 2026	
23	MF	(Turkey)	Fatoş Yıldırım	(Turkey) Afyonkarahisar Anadolu Gücü	24 July 2026	
14	DF	(Turkey)	Ümran Özev	(Turkey) Afyonkarahisar Anadolu Gücü	24 July 2026	
22	FW	(Nigeria)	Flourish Sabastine	(Portugal) Benfica	2 August 2026	

=== Contract renewals ===
No.	Pos.	Nat.	Name	Date	Until	Source

== Pre-season and friendlies ==
Win Draw Loss Fixtures

25 July 2026 Friendly	Fenerbahçe arsaVev (Turkey)	5–0	(Romania) FCV Farul Constanța	Istanbul
	Alves; Stašková; Uraz	Report		Stadium: Lefter Küçükandonyadis Stadium

27 July 2026 Friendly	Fenerbahçe arsaVev (Turkey)	3–0	(Romania) FCV Farul Constanța	Istanbul
	Kerimoğlu; Stašková; Uraz	Report		Stadium: Lefter Küçükandonyadis Stadium

19 August 2026 Friendly	Fenerbahçe arsaVev (Turkey)	4–2	(Bulgaria) Ludogorets	Düzce
	Alves; Stašková; Bozdağ	Report	Ivanova; Petrova	Stadium: Fenerbahçe Topuk Yaylası Facilities

== Competitions ==
=== Overall record ===
Competition	First match	Last match	Starting round	Final position	Record							
Competition	First match	Last match	Starting round	Final position	Pld	W	D	L	GF	GA	GD	Win %
Super League	30 August 2026	May 2027	Matchday 1		9	8	1	0	39	1	+38	88.89
UEFA Women's Champions League	5 August 2026	8 August 2026	Second qualifying round	Second qualifying round	2	1	1	0	3	2	+1	50.00
UEFA Women's Europa Cup	26 September 2026	11 November 2026	Second qualifying round	Round of 16	4	2	0	2	5	5	+0	50.00
Total					15	11	2	2	47	8	+39	73.33

Last updated: 14 November 2026
Source: FootyStats

=== Turkish Women's Football Super League ===
==== League table ====
Pos	Team	Pld	W	D	L	GF	GA	GD	Pts	Qualification or relegation
1	Fenerbahçe	9	8	1	0	39	1	+38	25	Qualification for the Champions League second qualifying round
2	Galatasaray	11	7	3	1	50	6	+44	24	Qualification for the Europa Cup first qualifying round
3	Beşiktaş	11	7	3	1	23	7	+16	24	
4	ABB Fomget	11	7	2	2	52	10	+42	23	
5	Trabzonspor	10	6	4	0	28	4	+24	22	

Updated to match(es) played on 14 November 2026. Source: TFF
Rules for classification: 1) Points; 2) Head-to-head points; 3) Head-to-head goal difference; 4) Head-to-head goals scored; 5) Goal difference; 6) Goals scored; 7) Play-off.

==== Results summary ====
Overall								Home						Away					
Pld	W	D	L	GF	GA	GD	Pts	W	D	L	GF	GA	GD	W	D	L	GF	GA	GD
9	8	1	0	39	1	+38	25	4	0	0	20	0	+20	4	1	0	19	1	+18

Last updated: 14 November 2026.
Source: TFF.org

==== Results by round ====
Round	1	2	3	4	5	6	7	8	9	10	11	12	13	14	15	16	17	18	19	20	21	22	23	24	25	26	27	28	29	30
Ground	H	A	H	A	H	A	H	H	A	H	A	H	A	H	A	A	H	A	H	A	H	A	A	H	A	H	A	H	A	H
Result	W	W	W	W	P	D	W	P	W	W	W																			
Position	1	1	1	1	1	3	3	5	4	3	1																			

Updated to match(es) played on 14 November 2026. Source: TFF.org
A = Away; H = Home; W = Win; D = Draw; L = Loss; P = Postponed

==== Matches ====
30 August 2026 1	Fenerbahçe arsaVev	2–0	ABB Fomget	Istanbul
17:00 TRT (UTC+3)	Kaya (yellow card) 74'; Kerimoğlu 85'; Kaján 90+4'	Report	Kuč (yellow card) 40'; Karabulut (yellow card) 70'; Hız (yellow card) FT	Stadium: Lefter Küçükandonyadis Stadium; Referee: Mücahit Karakurt

6 September 2026 2	Amed	0–3	Fenerbahçe arsaVev	Diyarbakır
17:00 TRT (UTC+3)	Ilić (yellow card) 74'	Report	Stašková 20'; Otu 49'; Manga 89'	Stadium: Seyrantepe 1 Nolu Saha; Referee: Sercan Karaca

13 September 2026 3	Fenerbahçe arsaVev	12–0	Şile BilgiDoğa	Istanbul
15:00 TRT (UTC+3)	Stašková 13', 41', 45'; Göksu 18', 70', 85'; Manga 25', 32', 66'; Bozdağ 47'; Şeker 62', 72'	Report		Stadium: Lefter Küçükandonyadis Stadium; Referee: Batuhan Gelgeç

19 September 2026 4	Beşiktaş	0–3	Fenerbahçe arsaVev	Istanbul
19:00 TRT (UTC+3)	Akgöz (yellow card) 48'; Ould Braham (yellow card) 89'	Report	Bowen 13'; Stašková 43'; Abideen 85'	Stadium: Fulya Hakkı Yeten Facility; Referee: Safa Yılmaz

18 November 2026 5	Fenerbahçe arsaVev	v	Ünye Kadın	Istanbul
13:00 TRT (UTC+3)		Report		Stadium: Lefter Küçükandonyadis Stadium

17 October 2026 6	Yüksekova	1–1	Fenerbahçe arsaVev	Hakkâri
15:00 TRT (UTC+3)	Adubea 44'	Report	Otu (yellow card) 72'; Uraz 79'	Stadium: Şemdinli District Stadium; Referee: Cengiz Yıldırım

24 October 2026 7	Fenerbahçe arsaVev	5–0	Haymana	Istanbul
14:00 TRT (UTC+3)	Alves 24'; Kaya 34'; Türkoğlu 43'; Şeker 65'; Bozdağ (yellow card) 68'; Uraz 75'	Report	Markovska (yellow card) 60'; Ellis (yellow card) 61'	Stadium: Lefter Küçükandonyadis Stadium; Referee: Alper Kerem Aras

16 December 2026 8	Fenerbahçe arsaVev	v	Kayseri Kadın	Istanbul
14:00 TRT (UTC+3)		Report		Stadium: Lefter Küçükandonyadis Stadium

1 November 2026 9	Giresun Sanayi	0–8	Fenerbahçe arsaVev	Giresun
14:00 TRT (UTC+3)	Keser (yellow card) 76'	Report	Stašková 48' (pen.), 80'; Alayont 61', 73', 87'; Kaján 69', 81'; Türkoğlu 75'	Stadium: Giresun 75. Yıl Sahası; Referee: Kemal Efe Özkan

7 November 2026 10	Fenerbahçe arsaVev	1–0	Galatasaray	Istanbul
14:00 TRT (UTC+3)	Plummer (yellow card) 44'; Türkoğlu 90'	Report	Foederer (yellow card) 12'; Öztürk (yellow card) 42'; Karataş (yellow card) 78'; Domin (yellow card) 90+5'; Eren (yellow card) FT	Stadium: Lefter Küçükandonyadis Stadium; Referee: Muhammed Ömür

14 November 2026 11	Bakırköy	0–4	Fenerbahçe arsaVev	Istanbul
14:00 TRT (UTC+3)	Yalçıner (yellow card) 55'	Report	Alves 18', 73'; Kocatürk 58' (o.g.); Kaya (yellow card) 60'; Gürel 81'	Stadium: Bakırköy Atatürk Yaşam Köyü Spor Tesisleri 2 Nolu Saha; Referee: Berat Bulut

9 December 2026 12	Fenerbahçe arsaVev	v	Hakkarigücü	Istanbul
14:00 TRT (UTC+3)		Report		Stadium: Lefter Küçükandonyadis Stadium

13 December 2026 13	Trabzonspor	v	Fenerbahçe arsaVev	Trabzon
14:00 TRT (UTC+3)		Report		Stadium: Kadir Özcan Tesisleri

19 December 2026 14	Fenerbahçe arsaVev	v	1207 Antalya	Istanbul
14:00 TRT (UTC+3)		Report		Stadium: Lefter Küçükandonyadis Stadium

23 December 2026 15	Sultanbeyli Gücü	v	Fenerbahçe arsaVev	Istanbul
14:00 TRT (UTC+3)		Report		Stadium: Belediye 100. Yıl Stadium

16	ABB Fomget	v	Fenerbahçe arsaVev	Ankara
--:-- TRT (UTC+3)		Report		Stadium: Osmanlı Stadium

17	Fenerbahçe arsaVev	v	Amed	Istanbul
--:-- TRT (UTC+3)		Report		Stadium: Lefter Küçükandonyadis Stadium

18	Şile BilgiDoğa	v	Fenerbahçe arsaVev	Istanbul
--:-- TRT (UTC+3)		Report		Stadium: Ömerli Stadium

19	Fenerbahçe arsaVev	v	Beşiktaş	Istanbul
--:-- TRT (UTC+3)		Report		Stadium: Lefter Küçükandonyadis Stadium

20	Ünye Kadın	v	Fenerbahçe arsaVev	Ordu
--:-- TRT (UTC+3)		Report		Stadium: Ünye İlçe Stadium

21	Fenerbahçe arsaVev	v	Yüksekova	Istanbul
--:-- TRT (UTC+3)		Report		Stadium: Lefter Küçükandonyadis Stadium

22	Haymana	v	Fenerbahçe arsaVev	Ankara
--:-- TRT (UTC+3)		Report		Stadium: Haymana İlçe Stadium

23	Kayseri Kadın	v	Fenerbahçe arsaVev	Kayseri
--:-- TRT (UTC+3)		Report		Stadium: Sümer 1 Nolu Saha

24	Fenerbahçe arsaVev	v	Giresun Sanayi	Istanbul
--:-- TRT (UTC+3)		Report		Stadium: Lefter Küçükandonyadis Stadium

25	Galatasaray	v	Fenerbahçe arsaVev	Istanbul
--:-- TRT (UTC+3)		Report		Stadium: Florya Metin Oktay Facilities

26	Fenerbahçe arsaVev	v	Bakırköy	Istanbul
--:-- TRT (UTC+3)		Report		Stadium: Lefter Küçükandonyadis Stadium

27	Hakkarigücü	v	Fenerbahçe arsaVev	Hakkâri
--:-- TRT (UTC+3)		Report		Stadium: Merzan City Stadium

28	Fenerbahçe arsaVev	v	Trabzonspor	Istanbul
--:-- TRT (UTC+3)		Report		Stadium: Lefter Küçükandonyadis Stadium

29	1207 Antalya	v	Fenerbahçe arsaVev	Antalya
--:-- TRT (UTC+3)		Report		Stadium: Zeytinköy 2 Nolu Saha

30	Fenerbahçe arsaVev	v	Sultanbeyli Gücü	Istanbul
--:-- TRT (UTC+3)		Report		Stadium: Lefter Küçükandonyadis Stadium

=== UEFA Women's Champions League ===
==== Second qualifying round ====
The draw for the second qualifying round was held on 18 June 2026.

5 August 2026 Semi-final	Metalist 1925 Kharkiv (Ukraine)	1–2	(Turkey) Fenerbahçe	Leuven, Belgium
13:00 CEST (UTC+2)	Hiryn 15'; Basanska (yellow card) 41'; Radionova (yellow card) 58'	Report	Türkoğlu 42'; Alves 67', (yellow card) 86'	Stadium: Den Dreef; Attendance: 196; Referee: Zuzana Valentová (Slovakia)

8 August 2026 Final	OH Leuven (Belgium)	1–1 (a.e.t.) (4–2 p)	(Turkey) Fenerbahçe	Leuven, Belgium
20:00 CEST (UTC+2)	Gielen (yellow card) 2'; Conijnenberg 56', (yellow card) 63'; Kuijpers (yellow card) 60'; Biesmans (yellow card) 100'; Papatheodorou (yellow card) 116'	Report	Plummer 8'	Stadium: Den Dreef; Attendance: 1,596; Referee: Elena Gobjila (Moldova)
	Penalties
	Biesmans (penalty scored); Conijnenberg (penalty scored); Kuijpers (penalty missed); Papatheodorou (penalty scored); Gielen (penalty scored)		(penalty scored) Abideen; (penalty missed) Türkoğlu; (penalty scored) Uraz; (penalty missed) Şeker

=== UEFA Women's Europa Cup ===
==== Second qualifying round ====
The draw for the second qualifying round was held on 4 September 2026.

26 September 2026 First leg	FC Minsk (Belarus)	1–4	(Turkey) Fenerbahçe	Mosonmagyaróvár, Hungary
16:00 CEST (UTC+2)	Valiuk 14'; Belaya (yellow card) 45+2'; Natsiatkova (yellow card) 46'; Kiskonen (yellow card) 80'	Report	Manga 41', 43'; Kaya (yellow card) 45+2'; Otu (yellow card) 52'; Stašková 63'; Ndzana (yellow card) 68'; Kaján 69'	Stadium: Wittmann Antal park Referee: Tatyana Sorokopudova (Kazakhstan)
Note: Due to the country's involvement in the Russian invasion of Ukraine, Belarusian teams were required to play their home matches at neutral venues and behind closed doors until further notice.

30 September 2026 Second leg	Fenerbahçe (Turkey)	1–0 (5–1 agg.)	(Belarus) FC Minsk	Istanbul, Turkey
20:00 TRT (UTC+3)	Şeker 34'	Report	Demidova (yellow card) 76' (yellow-red card) 90+4'	Stadium: Yusuf Ziya Öniş Stadium; Attendance: 620; Referee: Olivia Tschon (Austria)

==== Round of 16 ====
28 October 2026 First leg	Real Sociedad (Spain)	2–0	(Turkey) Fenerbahçe	San Sebastián, Spain
19:00 CET (UTC+1)	Maren 58'; Marín 64'	Report	Bowen (yellow card) 56'; Alves (red card) 81'; Şeker (yellow card) 89'	Stadium: Zubieta Facilities; Attendance: 805; Referee: Martina Molinaro (Italia)

11 November 2026 Second leg	Fenerbahçe (Turkey)	0–2 (0–4 agg.)	(Spain) Real Sociedad	Istanbul, Turkey
20:00 TRT (UTC+3)	Türkoğlu (yellow card) 28'	Report	Ndzana 2' (o.g.); Keefe 34'; Seelenfreund (yellow card) 65'; Camino (yellow card) 78'	Stadium: Şükrü Saracoğlu Stadium; Attendance: 7,313; Referee: Michaela Pachtová (Czech Republic)

== Statistics ==
Italic written players transferred/loaned out during the season.

=== Appearances and goals ===
No.	Pos	Nat	Player	Total		Süper Lig		Champions League		Europa Cup	
No.	Pos	Nat	Player	Apps	Goals	Apps	Goals	Apps	Goals	Apps	Goals
Goalkeepers
21	GK	(Paraguay) PAR	Soledad Belotto	3	0	3	0	0	0	0	0
71	GK	(Moldova) MDA	Natalia Munteanu	12	0	6	0	2	0	4	0
Defenders
2	DF	(Jamaica) JAM	Konya Plummer	10	1	4	0	2	1	4	0
5	DF	(Turkey) TUR	Yaşam Göksu	5	3	4	3	0	0	1	0
7	DF	(Cameroon) CMR	Colette Ndzana	11	0	7	0	0	0	4	0
14	DF	(New Zealand) NZL	Katie Bowen	11	1	6	1	2	0	3	0
17	DF	(Turkey) TUR	İpek Kaya	9	1	7	1	0	0	2	0
24	DF	(Turkey) TUR	Fatma Şakar	14	0	8	0	2	0	4	0
Midfielders
6	MF	(Nigeria) NGR	Regina Otu	13	1	7	1	2	0	4	0
8	MF	(Turkey) TUR	Cansu Gürel	9	1	5	1	0	0	4	0
9	MF	(Turkey) TUR	Busem Şeker	15	4	9	3	2	0	4	1
10	MF	(Turkey) TUR	Ece Türkoğlu	15	4	9	3	2	1	4	0
16	MF	(Azerbaijan) AZE	Peritan Bozdağ	9	1	6	1	1	0	2	0
19	MF	(Turkey) TUR	Mesude Alayont	9	3	6	3	2	0	1	0
20	MF	(Panama) PAN	Marta Cox	0	0	0	0	0	0	0	0
26	MF	(Nigeria) NGR	Suliat Abideen	15	1	9	1	2	0	4	0
29	MF	(Turkey) TUR	Mevlüde Okuyan	0	0	0	0	0	0	0	0
Forwards
11	FW	(Turkey) TUR	Yağmur Uraz	8	2	4	2	1	0	3	0
13	FW	(Turkey) TUR	Zeynep Kerimoğlu	12	1	7	1	2	0	3	0
30	FW	(Cameroon) CMR	Divine Manga	4	6	3	4	0	0	1	2
55	FW	(Hungary) HUN	Zsanett Kaján	14	4	8	3	2	0	4	1
77	FW	(Czech Republic) CZE	Andrea Stašková	15	8	9	7	2	0	4	1
93	FW	(Brazil) BRA	Maria Alves	12	4	9	3	2	1	1	0

Last updated: 14 November 2026

=== Goalscorers ===
Rank	No.	Pos	Nat	Player	Süper Lig	Champions League	Europa Cup	Total
1	77	FW	(Czech Republic)	Andrea Stašková	7	0	1	8
2	30	FW	(Cameroon)	Divine Manga	4	0	2	6
3	9	MF	(Turkey)	Busem Şeker	3	0	1	4
3	55	FW	(Hungary)	Zsanett Kaján	3	0	1	4
3	10	MF	(Turkey)	Ece Türkoğlu	3	1	0	4
3	93	FW	(Brazil)	Maria Alves	3	1	0	4
7	5	DF	(Turkey)	Yaşam Göksu	3	0	0	3
7	19	MF	(Turkey)	Mesude Alayont	3	0	0	3
9	11	FW	(Turkey)	Yağmur Uraz	2	0	0	2
10	2	DF	(Jamaica)	Konya Plummer	0	1	0	1
10	13	FW	(Turkey)	Zeynep Kerimoğlu	1	0	0	1
10	6	MF	(Nigeria)	Regina Otu	1	0	0	1
10	16	MF	(Azerbaijan)	Peritan Bozdağ	1	0	0	1
10	26	MF	(Nigeria)	Suliat Abideen	1	0	0	1
10	14	DF	(New Zealand)	Katie Bowen	1	0	0	1
10	17	DF	(Turkey)	İpek Kaya	1	0	0	1
10	8	MF	(Turkey)	Cansu Gürel	1	0	0	1
Totals					39	3	5	47

Last updated: 14 November 2026

=== Clean sheets ===
Rank	No.	Pos	Nat	Player	Süper Lig	Champions League	Europa Cup	Total
1	71	GK	(Moldova)	Natalia Munteanu	5	0	1	6
2	21	GK	(Paraguay)	Soledad Belotto	3	0	0	3
Totals					8	0	1	9

Last updated: 14 November 2026
