= Sibel Duman =

Turkish footballer (born 1990)

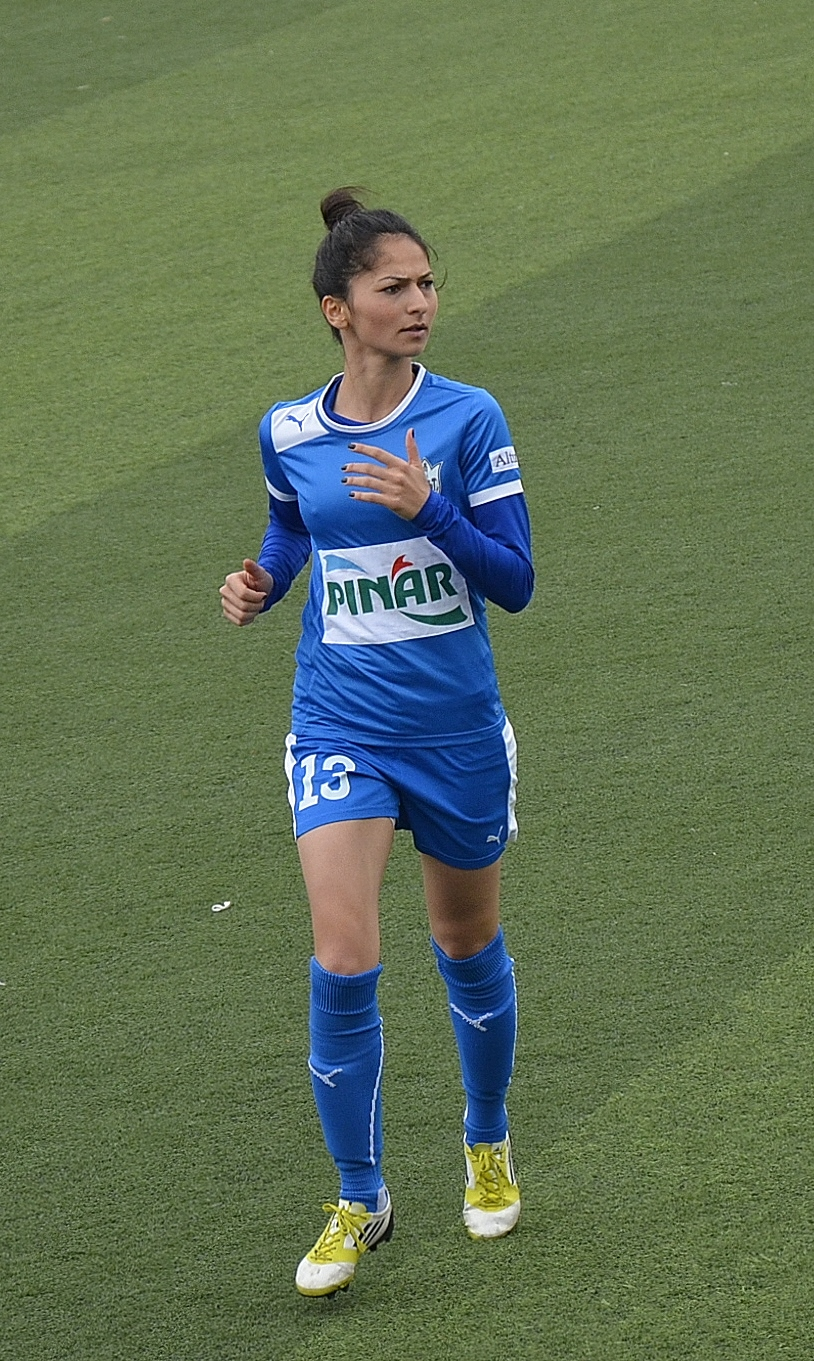
- Sibel Duman of Konak Belediyespor (January 2014)

Personal information
- Full name: Sibel Duman
- Date of birth: 23 February 1990 (age 36)
- Place of birth: Kartal, Istanbul, Turkey
- Position: Midfielder

Team information
- Current team: Bakırköy Kadın
- Number: 13

Senior career*
Years	Team	Apps	(Gls)
2008–2009	Maltepe Yalıspor	7	(0)
2009–2011	Çamlıcaspor	27	(15)
2011–2012	Lüleburgaz 39 Spor	19	(1)
2012–2015	Konak Belediyespor	41	(1)
2015–2017	Trabzon İdmanocağı	2	(0)
2017–2018	Beşiktaş J.K.	15	(1)
2018	Kireçburnu Spor	3	(0)
2019	Ataşehir Belediyespor	9	(0)
2021–2022	Fatih Karagümrük	25	(5)
2022–2023	Beşiktaş	16	(1)
2023–2024	Gaziantep Asya	14	(1)
2024–	Bakırköy Kadın	21	(11)

International career^{‡}
2008	Turkey U-19	2	(0)
2011–2014	Turkey	12	(1)
- * Club domestic league appearances and goals as of 23 october 2026 ‡ National team caps and goals as of 17 September 2014

Sibel Duman (born 23 February 1990) is a Turkish female association footballer who plays for Bakırköy Kadın in the Turkish Women's Super League. She was part of the Turkey women's national football team between 2011 and 2014.

== Club career ==
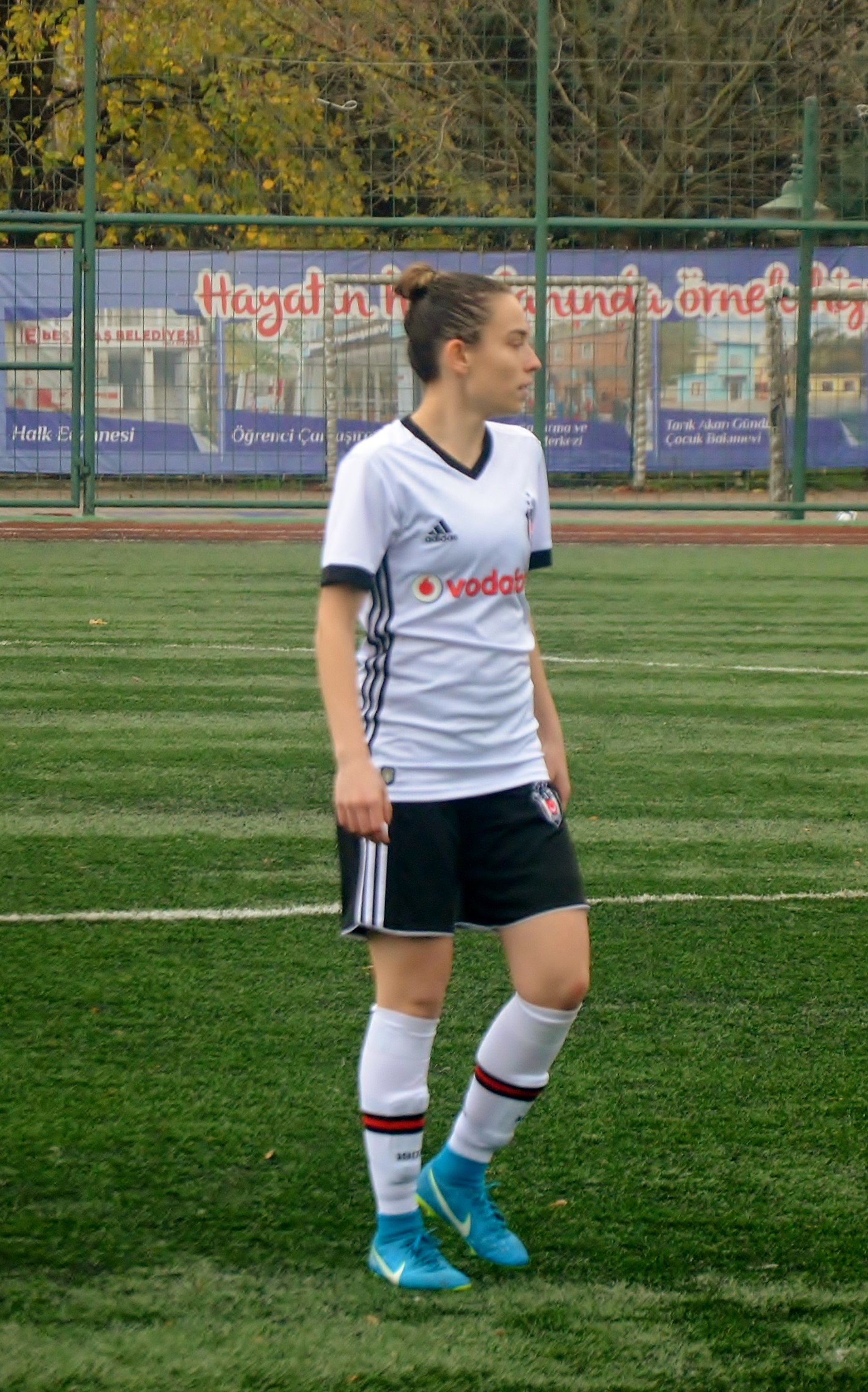
Duman playing for Beşiktaş J.K. in the 2017–18 season

Duman played for Maltepe Yalıspor (2007–2009), Çamlıcaspor (2009–2011) and Lüleburgaz 39 Spor (2011–2012). For the 2012–13 season, she transferred to the İzmir-based club Konak Belediyespor, and enjoyed her first league championship at the end of the season.

Playing for Konak Belediyespor at 2013–14 UEFA Women's Champions League, she scored her first international goal in the match against NSA Sofia on 8 August, and then her team's only goal in the match against Cardiff City on 13 August 2013.

For the 2015–16 season, She transferred to Trabzon İdmanocağı. The next season, she could not appear on the ground due to injury of cruciate ligament rupture.

Duman joined Beşiktaş J.K. in the 2017–18 season. After playing in the first half of the 2018–19 First League season for Kireçburnu Spor, she transferred to Ataşehir Belediyespor.

In the 2021–22 Turkcell Women's Super League season, she joined the newly established club Fatih Karagümrük.

In July 2022, she returned to her former club Beşiktaş for the 2022–23 Super League season.

In the 2023–24 Super League, she transferred to Gaziantep Asya S.K.

Duman moved to Istanbul in 2024, and started to play for Bakırköy Kadın in the third-tier Women's Second League. She contributed to the promotion of her team to the Women's First League in the next season. Her team finished the 2025-26 Women'First League season as champion, and was promoted to the topflight Women's Super League for the next season.

International matches with club
Date	Venue	Opponent	Competition	Result	Scored
8 August 2013	Asim Ferhatović Hase Stadium Sarajevo, Bosnia and Herzegovina	(Bulgaria) NSA Sofia	2013–14 UEFA Women's Champions League- Group 1	W 2–0	1
10 August 2013	Stadion Otoka Sarajevo, Bosnia and Herzegovina	(Bosnia and Herzegovina) SFK 2000	2013–14 UEFA Women's Champions League- Group 1	W 2–1	0
13 August 2013	Gradski SRC Slavija Sarajevo, Bosnia and Herzegovina	(Wales) Cardiff City	2013–14 UEFA Women's Champions League- Group 1	W 1–0	1
10 October 2013	İzmir Alsancak Stadium İzmir, Turkey	(Poland) Unia Racibórz	2013–14 UEFA Women's Champions League – Round of 32	W 2–1	0
17 October 2013	OSiR Stadium Racibórz, Poland	(Poland) Unia Racibórz	2013–14 UEFA Women's Champions League – Round of 32	D 0–0	0
10 November 2013	İzmir Alsancak Stadium İzmir, Turkey	(Austria) SV Neulengbach	2013–14 UEFA Women's Champions League – Round of 16	L 0–3	0
14 November 2013	Wienerwaldstadion Neulengbach, Austria	(Austria) SV Neulengbach	2013–14 UEFA Women's Champions League – Round of 16	L 0–3	0

== International career ==
Duman was admitted to the Turkey U-19 national team in 2008, and played in two friendly matches that year. In 2011, she became a member of the Turkey women's national team, and played against Greek and Portuguese teams in friendly matches. On 31 March 2012 Duman played the last six minutes in the Turkish national team's UEFA Women's Euro 2013 qualifying – Group 2 match against Switzerland that lost 0–5.

She took part at the 2015 FIFA Women's World Cup qualification – UEFA Group 6 matches, and netted a goal against Montenegro.

International goals
Date	Venue	Opponent	Competition	Result	Scored
19 June 2014	Stadion Pod Malim Brdom Petrovac, Montenegro	Montenegro	2015 FIFA Women's World Cup qualification – UEFA Group 6	W 3–2	1

== Career statistics ==
As of match played 23 October 2026.

Club	Season	League			Continental		National		Total	
Club	Season	Division	Apps	Goals	Apps	Goals	Apps	Goals	Apps	Goals
Maltepe Yalıspor	2007–08	First League			–	–	1	0	1	0
Maltepe Yalıspor	2008–09	First League	7	0	–	–	1	0	8	0
Maltepe Yalıspor	Total		7	0	–	–	2	0	9	0
Çamlıcaspor	2009–10	Regional League	8	1	–	–	0	0	8	1
Çamlıcaspor	2010–11	Second League	19	14	–	–	0	0	19	14
Çamlıcaspor	Total		27	15	–	–	0	0	27	15
Lüleburgaz 39 Spor	2011–12	First League	19	1	–	–	3	0	22	1
Konak Belediyespor	2012–13	First League	15	0	–	–	0	0	15	0
Konak Belediyespor	2013–14	First League	15	1	7	2	7	1	29	4
Konak Belediyespor	2014–15	First League	11	0	3	0	2	0	16	0
Konak Belediyespor	Total		41	1	10	2	9	1	60	4
Trabzon İdmanocağı	2015–16	First League	2	0	–	–	0	0	2	0
Beşiktaş J.K.	2017–18	First League	15	1	–	–	0	0	15	1
Kireçburnu Spor	2018–19	First League	3	0	–	–	0	0	3	0
Ataşehir Belediyespor	2018–19	First League	9	0	–	–	0	0	9	0
Fatih Karagümrük	2021–22	Super League	25	5	–	–	0	0	25	5
FBeşiktaş J.K.	2022–23	Super League	16	1	–	–	0	0	16	1
Gaziantep Asya	2023–24	Super League	14	1	–	–	0	0	14	1
Bakırköy Kadın	2024–25	Second League	7	3	–	–	0	0	7	3
Bakırköy Kadın	2025–26	First League	12	8	–	–	0	0	12	8
Bakırköy Kadın	2026–27	Super League	2	0	–	–	0	0	2	0
Bakırköy Kadın	Total		21	11	–	–	0	0	21	11
Career total			199	36	10	2	14	1	223	38

== Honours ==
Turkish Women's Football First League

Konak Belediyespor
Winners (3): 2012–13, 2013–14, 2014–15

Beşiktaş
Runners-up (1): 2017–18

Bakırköy Kadın
Winners (1): 2025–26

Turkish Women's Football Second League

Bakırköy Kadın
Winners (1): 2024–25
