= Esra Özkan =

Turkish footballer (born 1996)

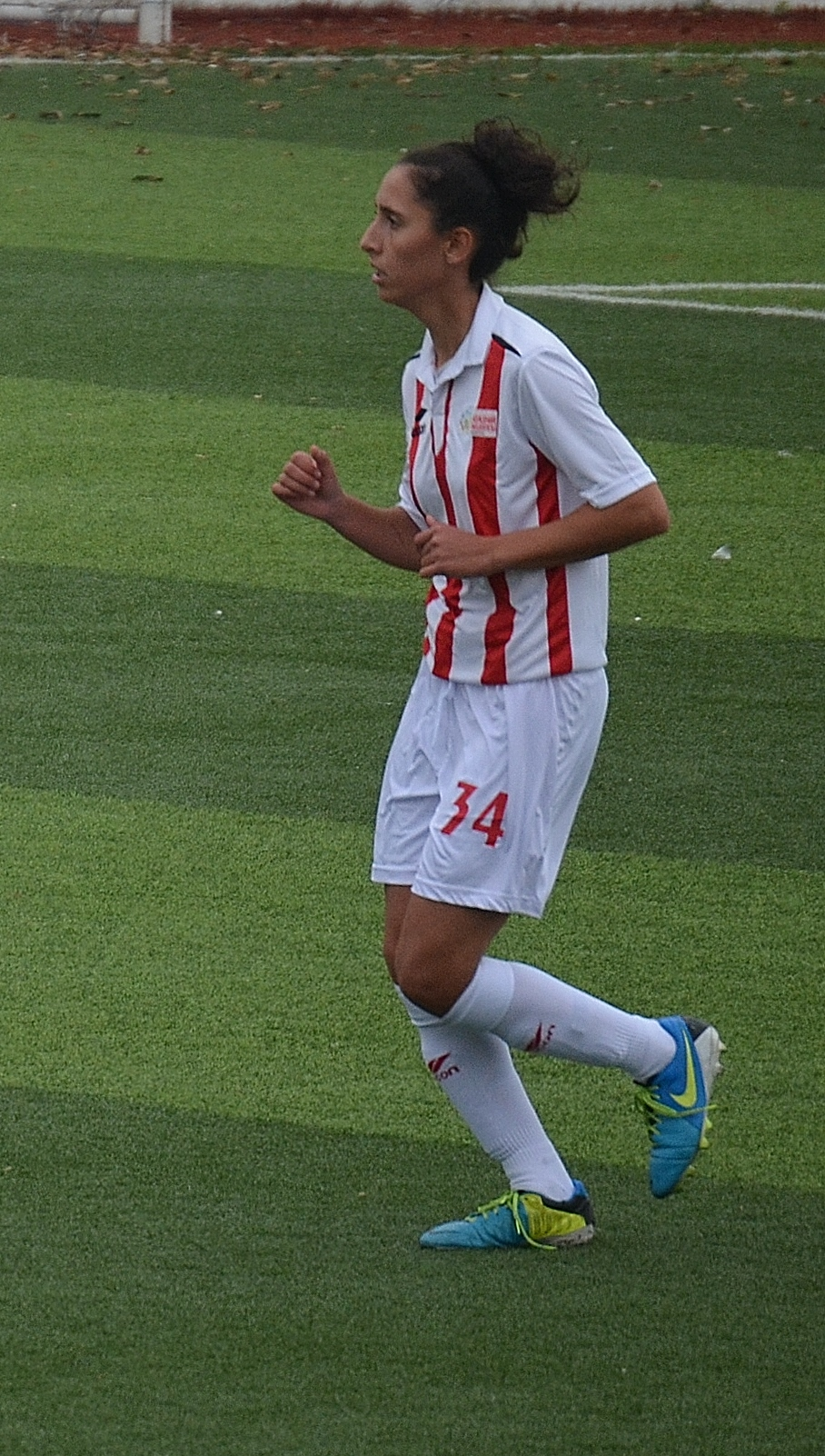
- Esra Özkan for Ataşehir Belediyespor (October 2014).

Personal information
- Date of birth: September 8, 1996 (age 30)
- Place of birth: Üsküdar, Istanbul, Turkey
- Positions: Midfielder; forward

Team information
- Current team: Çerkezköy 1923 Gençlik Spor
- Number: 6

Senior career*
Years	Team	Apps	(Gls)
2008–2013	Marmara Üniversitesispor	77	(27)
2014	Ataşehir Belediyespor	11	(3)
2015	Kireçburnu Spor	8	(3)
2017–2018	Çerkezköy 1923 Gençlik Spor	9	(2)
Total		105	(35)

International career^{‡}
2011–2013	Turkey U-17	14	(0)
2013–2014	Turkey U-19	22	(3)
- * Club domestic league appearances and goals as of February 18, 2018 ‡ National team caps and goals as of March 19, 2015

Esra Özkan (born September 8, 1996) is a Turkish women's football forward last played in the Turkish Women's Third Football League for Çerkezköy 1923 Gençlik Spor in Çerkezköy, Tekirdağ with jersey number 6.

== Career ==
=== Club ===
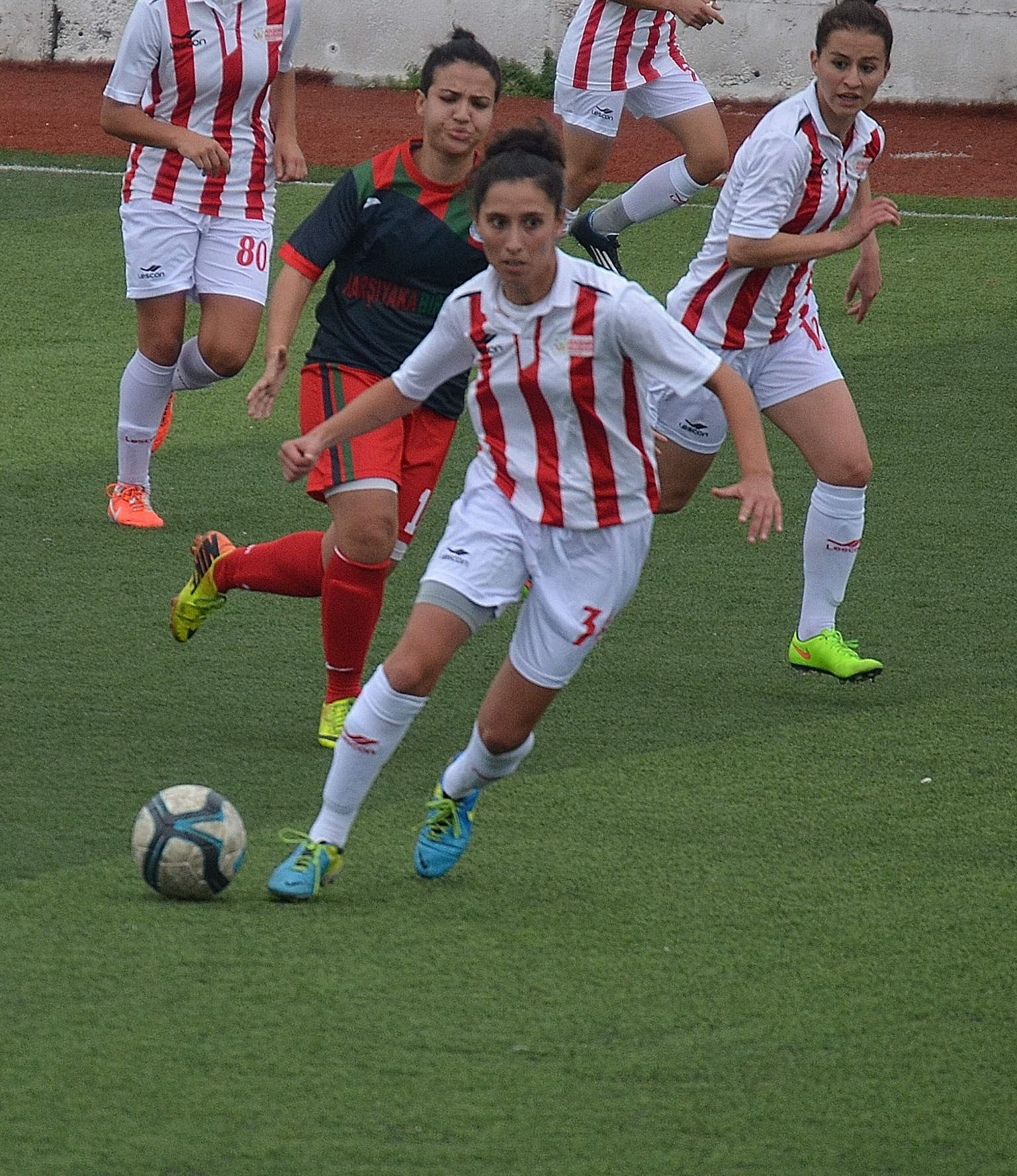
Esra Özkan playing for Ataşehir Belediyespor in the 2014–15 season.

Esra Özkan obtained her license on November 15, 2007. She entered Marmara Üniversitesispor in the 2008–09 season. She played five full seasons, of which two were in the Turkish Women's First season. In the mid of the 2013–14 First League season, she transferred to Ataşehir Belediyespor. She was capped 77 times and scored 27 goals with Marmara Üniversitesispor.

Özkan serves as the captain of the girls' football team at her high school, which is a top-ranking team of the Turkish High School Girls' Football Championship. She plays also futsal in her school team. She was part of the team representing Turkey at the 2014 ISF World Schools Futsal Championship held in Italy that became champion in the girls' category.

In the second half of the 2014–15 season, she transferred to Istanbul-based Second League team Kireçburnu Spor. At the end of the season, her team enjoyed promotion to the Women's First League.

Özkan stayed the following two seasons away from the football pitch. In December 2017, in the mid of the 2017–18 season, she transferred to the Women's Third League club Çerkezköy 1923 Gençlik Spor. After scoring two goals in nine matches, she retired.

=== International ===
She was called up to the Turkey women's U-17 team debuting in the 2012 UEFA Women's Under-17 Championship qualification match against the Serbian girls on September 29, 2011.

Özkan was admitted to the Turkey women's U-19 team playing her first game in a friendly match against junior women from Bosnia and Herzegovina on April 3, 2013.

== Career statistics ==
As of match played February 18, 2018

Club	Season	League			Continental		National		Total	
Club	Season	Division	Apps	Goals	Apps	Goals	Apps	Goals	Apps	Goals
Marmara Üniversitesispor	2008–09	Second League	5	0	–	–	0	0	5	0
Marmara Üniversitesispor	2009–10	First League	17	0	–	–	0	0	17	0
Marmara Üniversitesispor	2010–11	First League	22	1	–	–	0	0	22	1
Marmara Üniversitesispor	2011–12	Second League	11	11	–	–	5	0	16	11
Marmara Üniversitesispor	2012–13	Second League	14	14	–	–	11	0	25	14
Marmara Üniversitesispor	2013–14	First League	8	1	–	–	6	2	14	3
Marmara Üniversitesispor	Total		77	27	–	–	22	2	99	29
Ataşehir Belediyespor	2013–14	First League	7	1	–	–	10	1	17	2
Ataşehir Belediyespor	2014–15	First League	4	2	–	–	1	0	5	2
Ataşehir Belediyespor	Total		11	3	–	–	11	1	22	4
Kireçburnu Spor	2014–15	Second League	8	3	–	–	3	0	11	3
Kireçburnu Spor	Total		8	3	–	–	3	0	11	3
Çerkezköy 1923 Gençlik Spor	2017–18	Third League	9	2	–	–	0	0	9	2
Çerkezköy 1923 Gençlik Spor	Total		9	2	–	–	0	0	9	2
Career total			105	35	–	–	36	3	141	38

== Honours ==
Turkey Women's First League

Ataşehir Belediyespor
Runners-up (1): 2013–14

ISF World Schools Futsal Championship

Mevlana Vocational High School
Winners (1): 2014
