= Çayırbaşı Stadium =

Football stadium in Sarıyer, Istanbul, Turkey

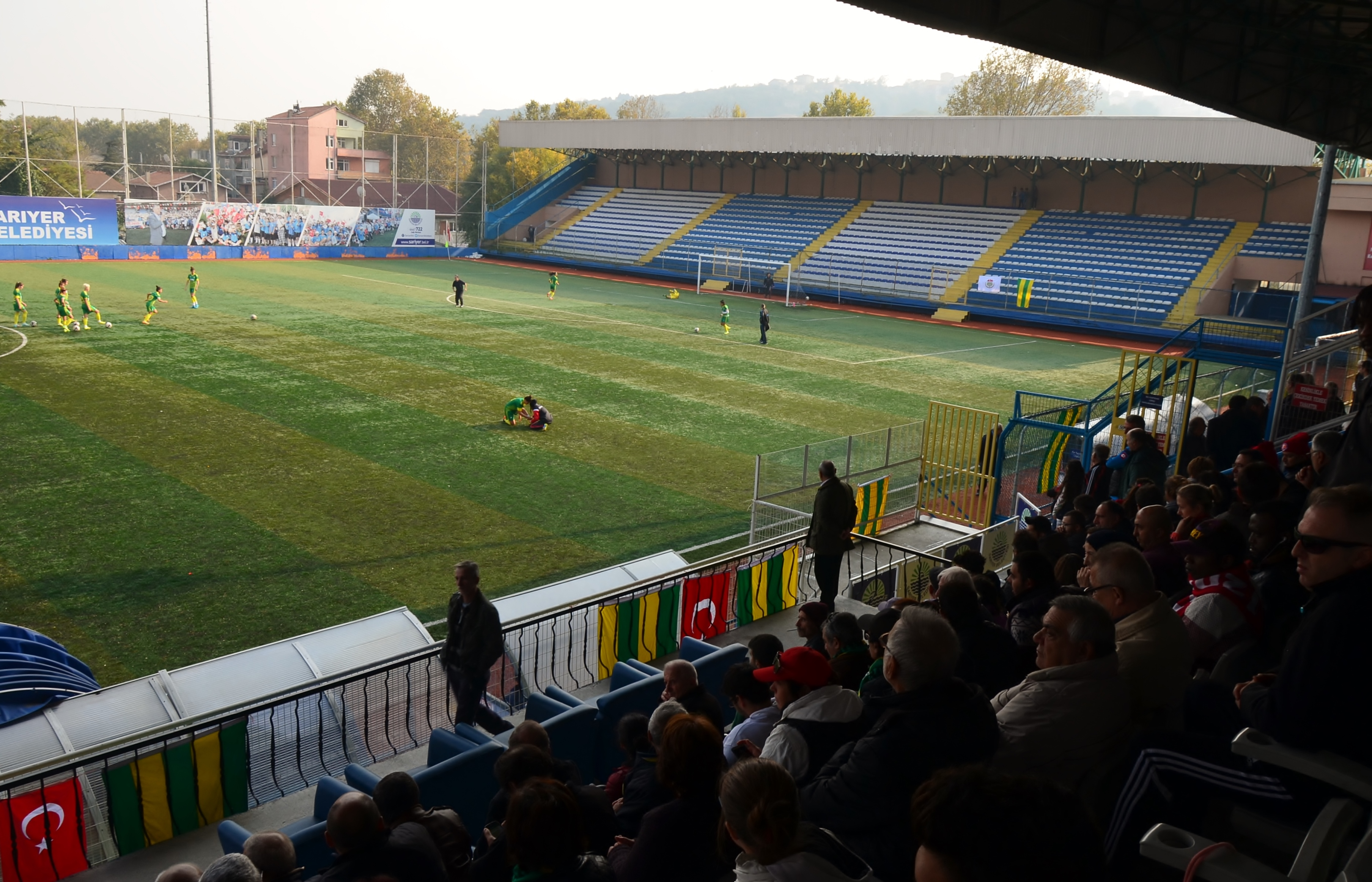
- View of Çayırbaşı Stadium

- Location of Çayırbaşı Stadium in Istanbul, Turkey
- Location: Sarıyer, Istanbul, Turkey
- Coordinates: 41°09′22.87″N 29°01′49.30″E
- Owner: Ministry of Youth and Sports
- Operator: Municipality of Sarıyer
- Capacity: 5,000
- Surface: Artificial turf

Construction
- Opened: 2002

Tenant
- Kireçburnu Spor

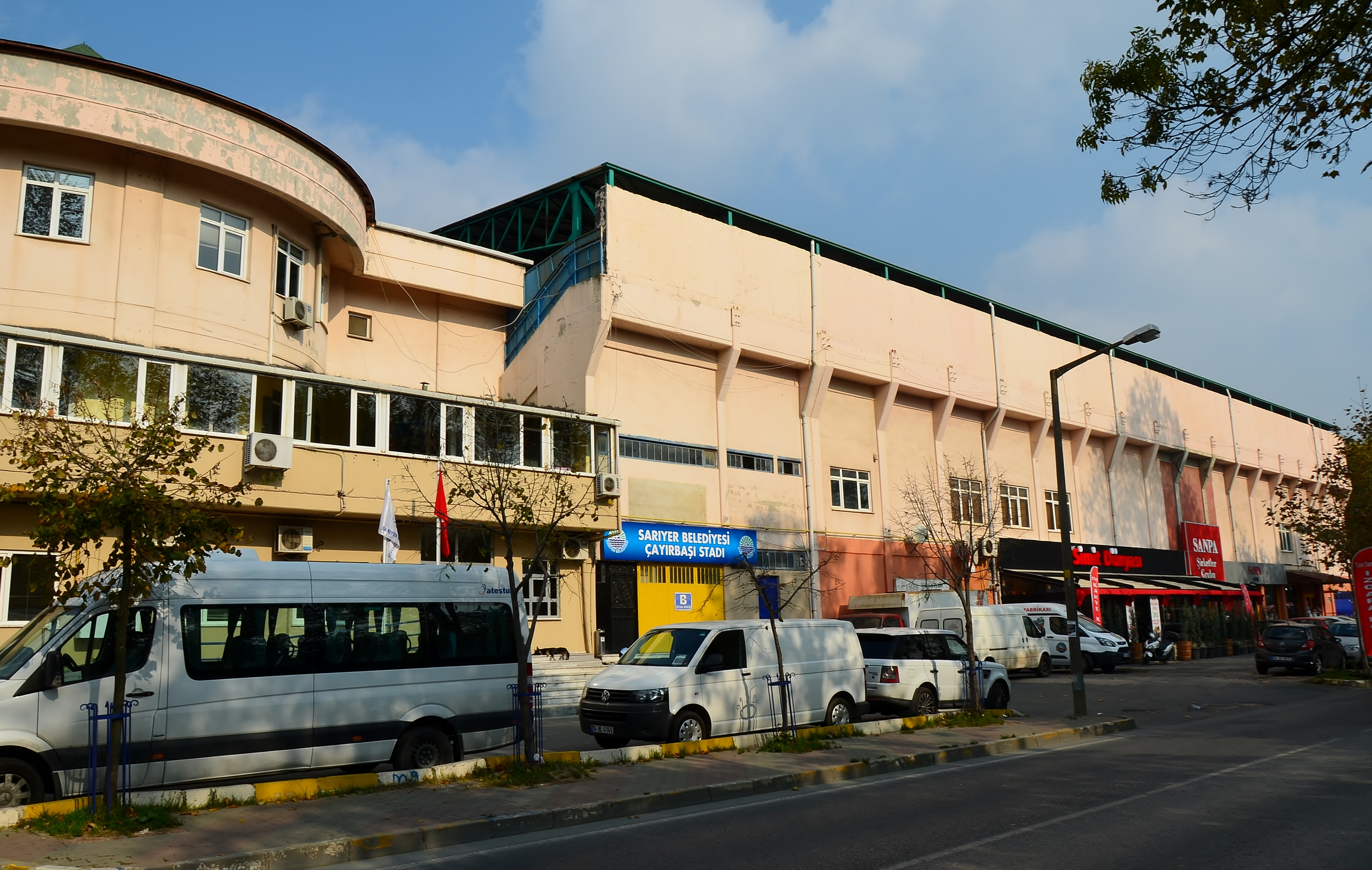
Main building of Çayırbaşı Stadium.

Çayırbaşı Stadium (Turkish: Sarıyer Belediyesi Çayırbaşı Stadı) is a football stadium at Çayırbaşı neighborhood of Sarıyer district in Istanbul Province, Turkey owned and run by the Municipality of Sarıyer. Built in 2002, it has a seating capacity for 5,000 spectators. The ground is artificial turf.

The stadium is currently used for football matches only, and it is the home ground of Kireçburnu Spor women's football team.
