= Hilal Çetinkaya =

Turkish footballer (born 1997)

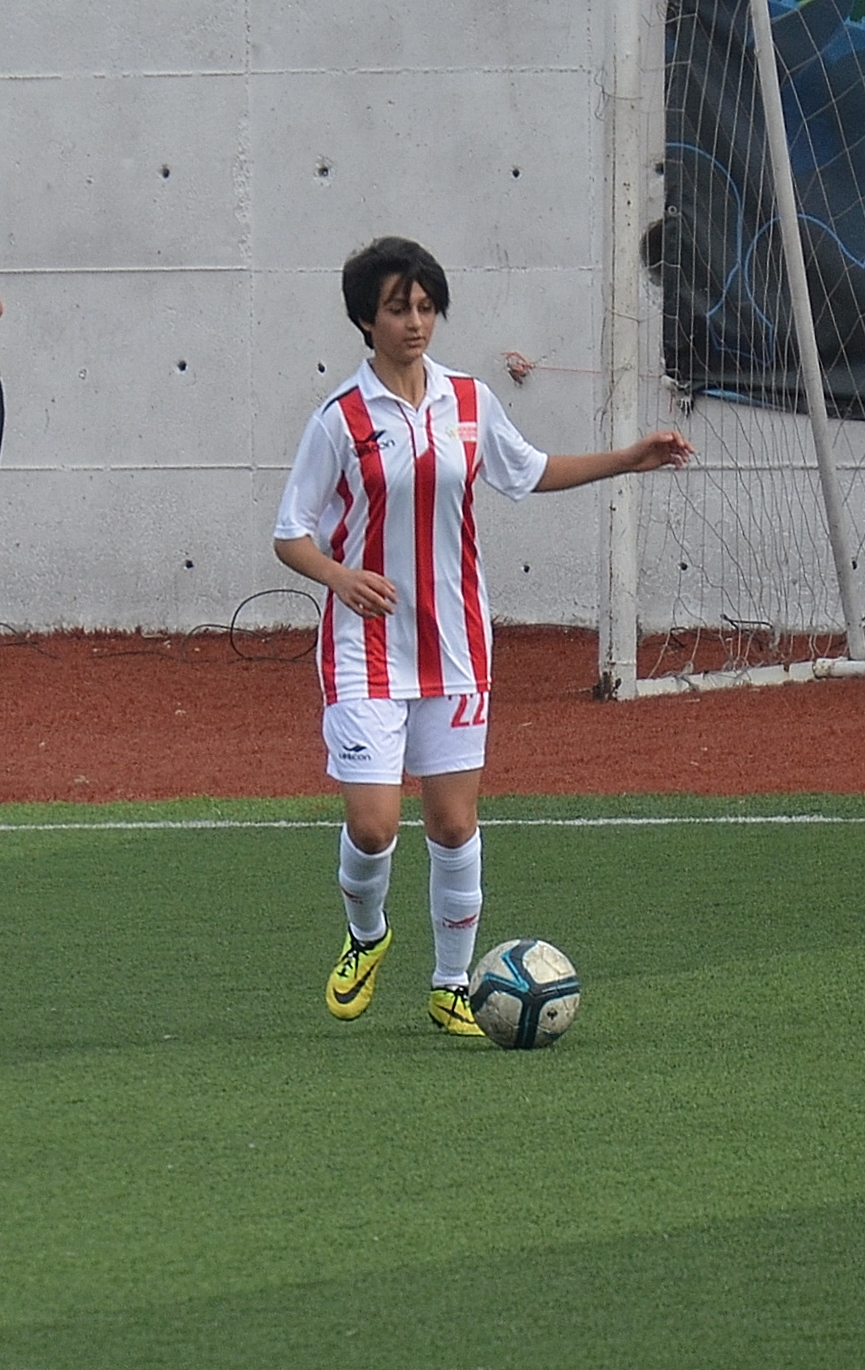
- Hilal Çetinkaya for Ataşehir Belediyespor (October 2014).

Personal information
- Date of birth: March 3, 1997 (age 29)
- Place of birth: Kadıköy, Istanbul, Turkey
- Position: Midfielder

Team information
- Current team: Kireçburnu Sporr
- Number: 28

Senior career*
Years	Team	Apps	(Gls)
2012–2017	Ataşehir Belediyespor	57	(17)
2017–	Kireçburnu Spor	13	(2)
Total		70	(19)

International career^{‡}
2012–2013	Turkey U-17	10	(1)
2013–2014	Turkey U-19	4	(0)
- * Club domestic league appearances and goals as of April 18, 2018 ‡ National team caps and goals as of June 13, 2014

Hilal Çetinkaya (born March 3, 1997) is a Turkish women's football midfielder currently playing in the Turkish Women's First Football League for Kireçburnu Spor in Istanbul with jersey number 28. She is member of the Turkey national U-17 and U-19 teams.

She was born in Kadıköy, Istanbul on March 3, 1997. Currently, she is studying hairstyling at Mevlana Vocational Highschool in Ataşehir.

== Career ==
=== Club ===
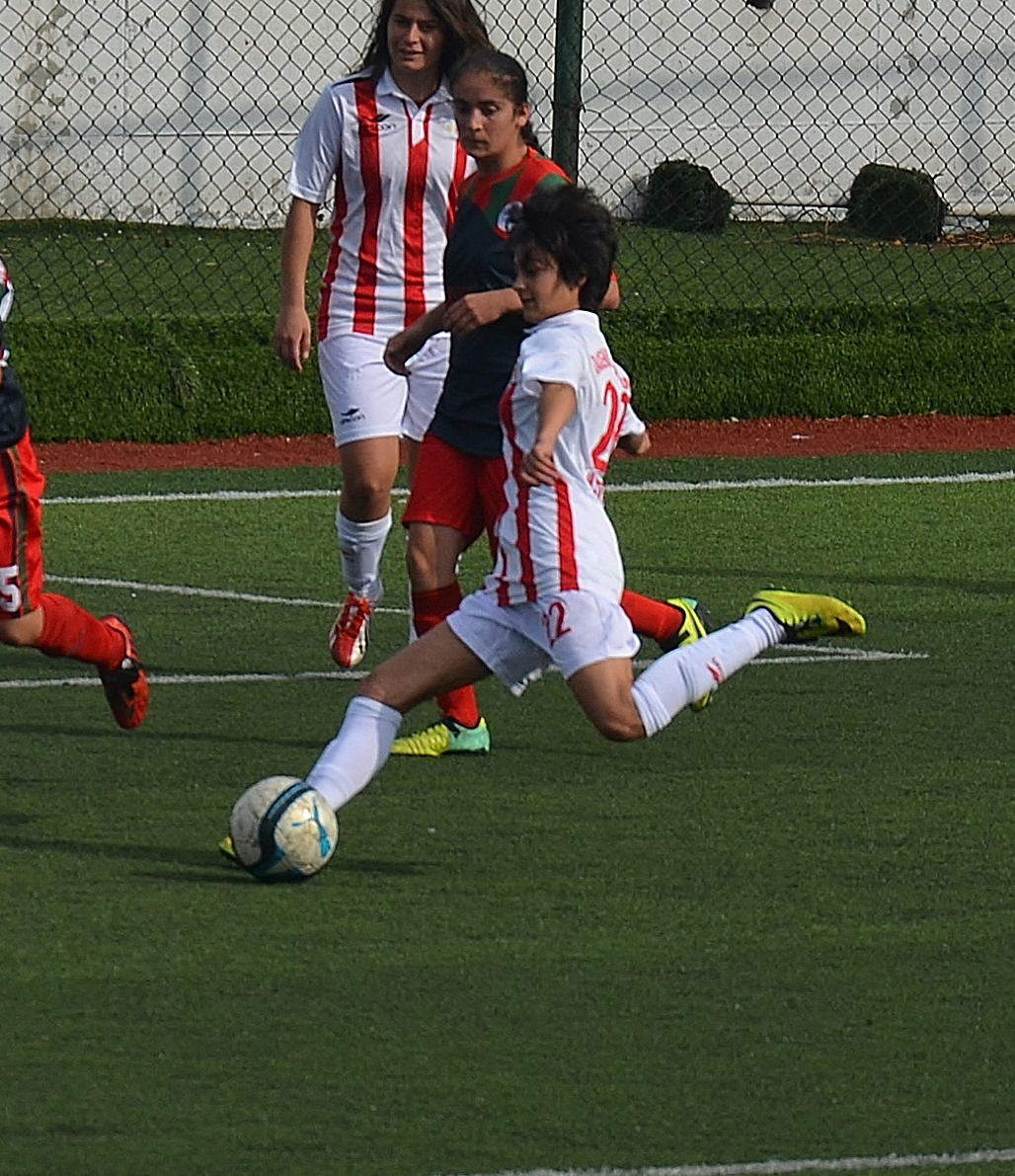
Hilal Çetinkaya driving the ball for Ataşehir Belediyespor in the home match against Karşıyaka BESEM Spor in the 2014–15 season.

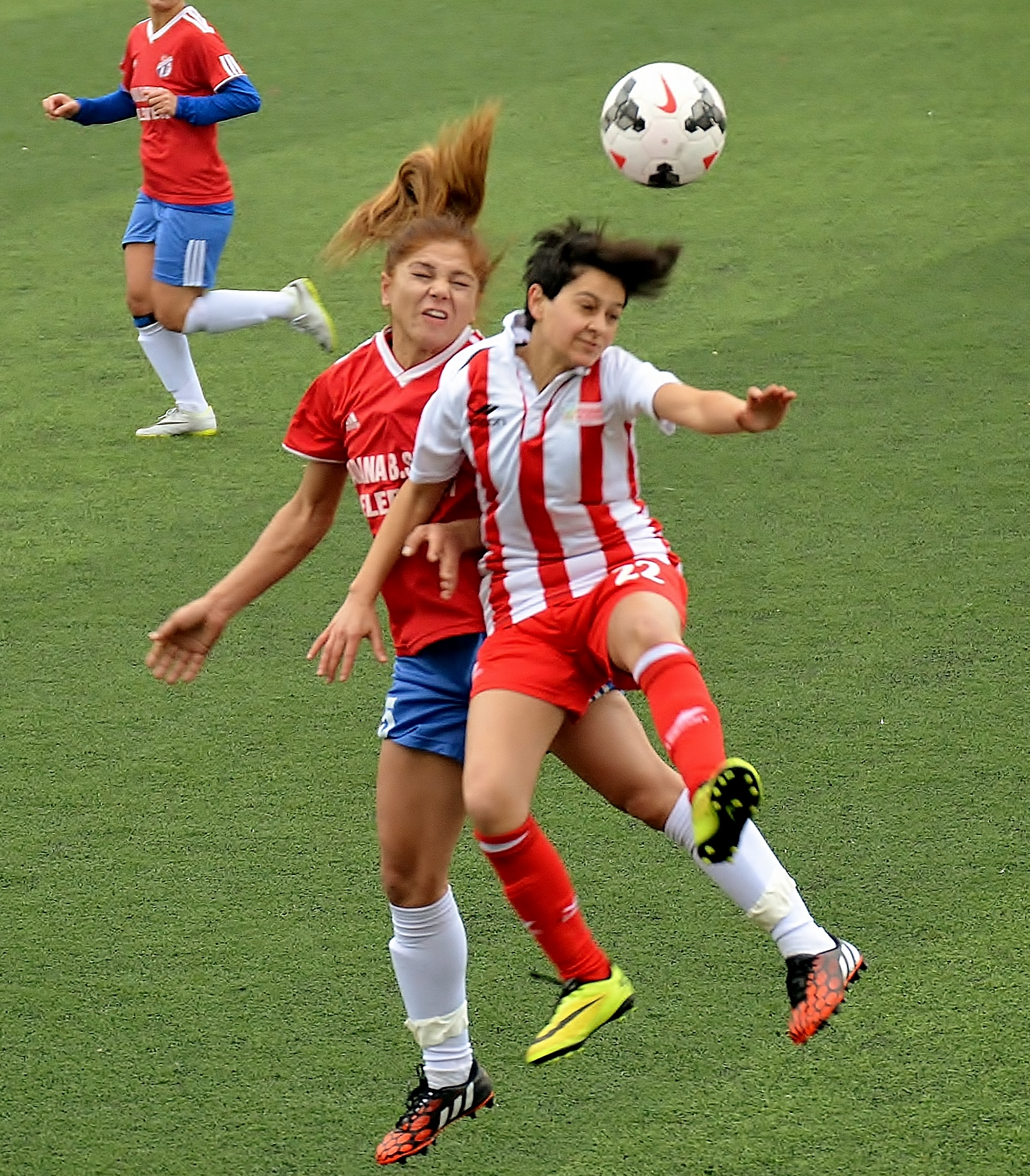
Hilal Çetinkaya(white/red) playing for Ataşehir Belediyespor in the 2014–15 season.

Hilal Çetinkaya obtained her license on March 26, 2010. Since the 2012–13 season, she is part of Ataşehir Belediyespor playing in the Turkeish Women's First League. She was also member of the youth team of her club, which play in the Turkish Girls' Football Championship.

Çetinkaya plays futsal in her highschool's team. She was part of the team representing Turkey at the 2014 ISF World Schools Futsal Championship held in Italy that became champion in the girls' category. She was named top scorer of the tournament with 17 goals before her teammate, the only 14-year-old Kader Hançar, who netted 15 goals.

In October 2017, Çerinkaya transferred to Kireçburnu Spor.

=== International ===
Çetinkaya was admitted to the Turkey girls' U-17 team debuting in the friendly match against the Azeri girls on September 9, 2012. On November 26, 2013, she played her first game in the Turkey national U-19 team again in a friendly match against the junior women from Azerbaijan.

== Career statistics ==
As of April 18, 2018.

Club	Season	League			Continental		National		Total	
Club	Season	Division	Apps	Goals	Apps	Goals	Apps	Goals	Apps	Goals
Ataşehir Belediyespor	2012–13	First League	4	0	–	–	7	1	11	1
Ataşehir Belediyespor	2013–14	First League	14	5	–	–	7	0	21	5
Ataşehir Belediyespor	2014–15	First League	16	7	–	–	0	0	16	7
Ataşehir Belediyespor	2015–16	First League	14	5	–	–	0	0	14	5
Ataşehir Belediyespor	2016–17	First League	9	0	–	–	0	0	9	0
Ataşehir Belediyespor	Total		57	17	–	–	14	1	71	18
Kireçburnu Spor	2017–18	First League	13	2	–	–	0	0	13	2
Kireçburnu Spor	Total		13	2	–	–	10	0	13	2
Career total			70	19	–	–	14	1	84	20

== Honours ==
Turkey Women's First Football League

Ataşehir Belediyespor
Runners-up (4): 2012–13, 2013–14, 2014–15, 2015–16
Third places (1): 2016–17

ISF World Schools Futsal Championship

Mevlana Vocational Highschool team
Winners (1): 2014
