= Fenerbahçe Lefter Küçükandonyadis Sports Complex =

Sports complex in Turkey

- Fenerbahçe Lefter Küçükandonyadis; Kamp Tesisler
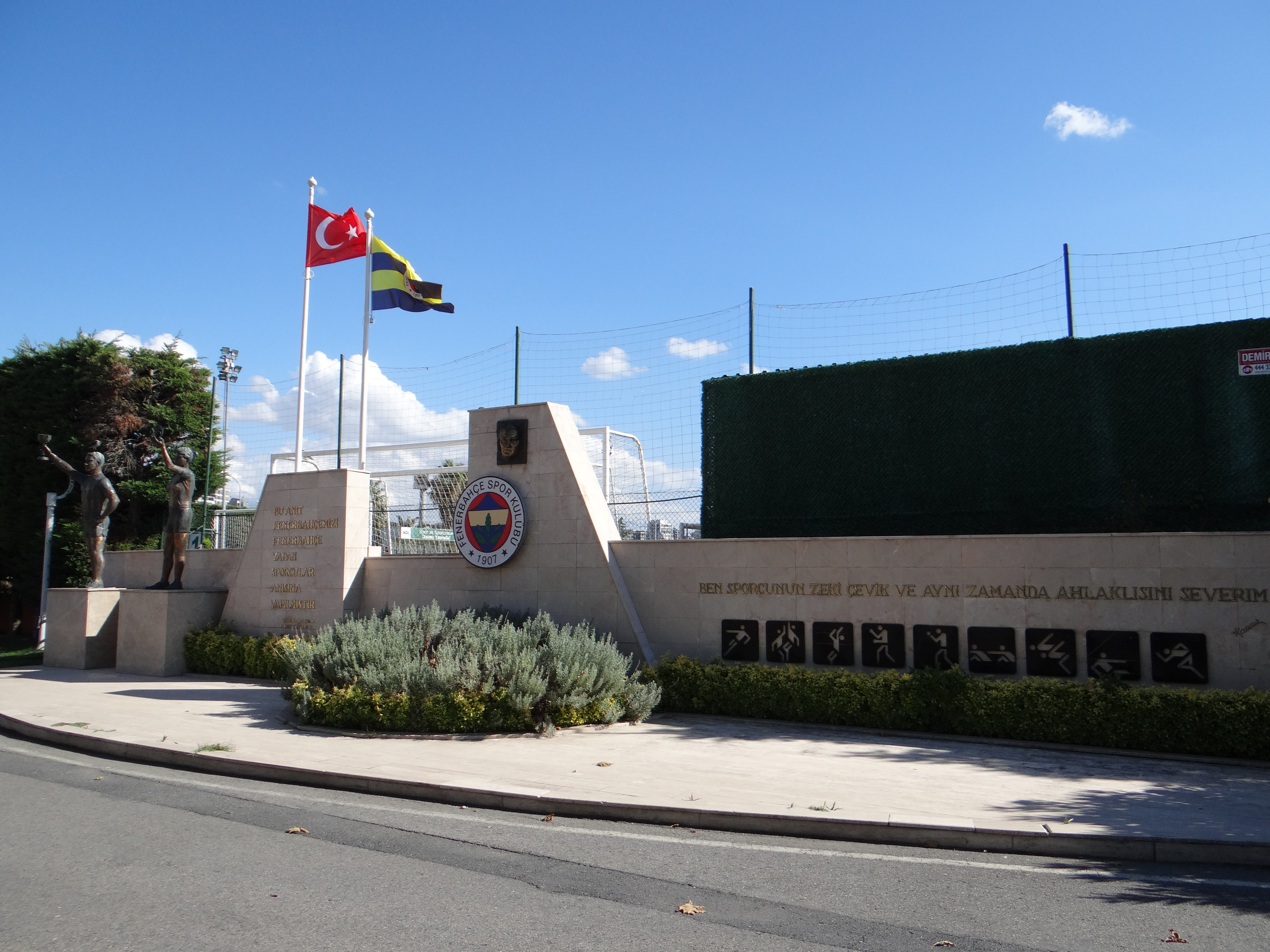
- Entrance of the sports complex.

- Location of the sports complex in Kadıköy, Istanbul.
- Former names: Fenerbahçe Dereağzı Facility
- Address: Münir Nurettin Selçuk Cad., Kızıltoprak, Kadıköy; Istanbul; Turkey
- Coordinates: 40.98332°N 29.03562°E
- Owner: Kadıköy Municipality
- Operator: Fenerbahçe S.K.

Construction
- Opened: 1989; 37 years ago
- Renovated: 2002; 24 years ago

The Fenerbahçe Lefter Küçükandonyadis Sports Complex (Turkish: Fenerbahçe Lefter Küçükandonyadis Kamp Tesisleri) is a sports complex of the Fenerbahçe S.K. established in 1989 at Kadıköy, Istanbul in Turkey.

== Overview ==
The Fenerbahçe Lefter Küçükandonyadis Facility was established in 1989 as a sports complex of the Fenerbahçe S.K. It is situated at Münir Nurettin Selçuk Cad., Kızıltoprak's Dereağzılocation in Kadıköy district of Istanbul, Turkey. The facility's renovation completed in 2002. Formerly called Fenerbahçe Dereağzı Facility (Fenerbahçe Dereağzı Tesisleri), it was renamed in honor of Lefter Küçükandonyadis (1925–2012), the legendary Greek-descent Turkish striker of Fenerbahçe S.K. and Turkey national team. In 2003, the football field was covered with artificial turf, and a Tartan track was added. Covering an area of 3.7 ha (9.1 acres), the sports complex is owned by the district municipality, and run by the Fenerbahçe S.K.

== Sports complex ==
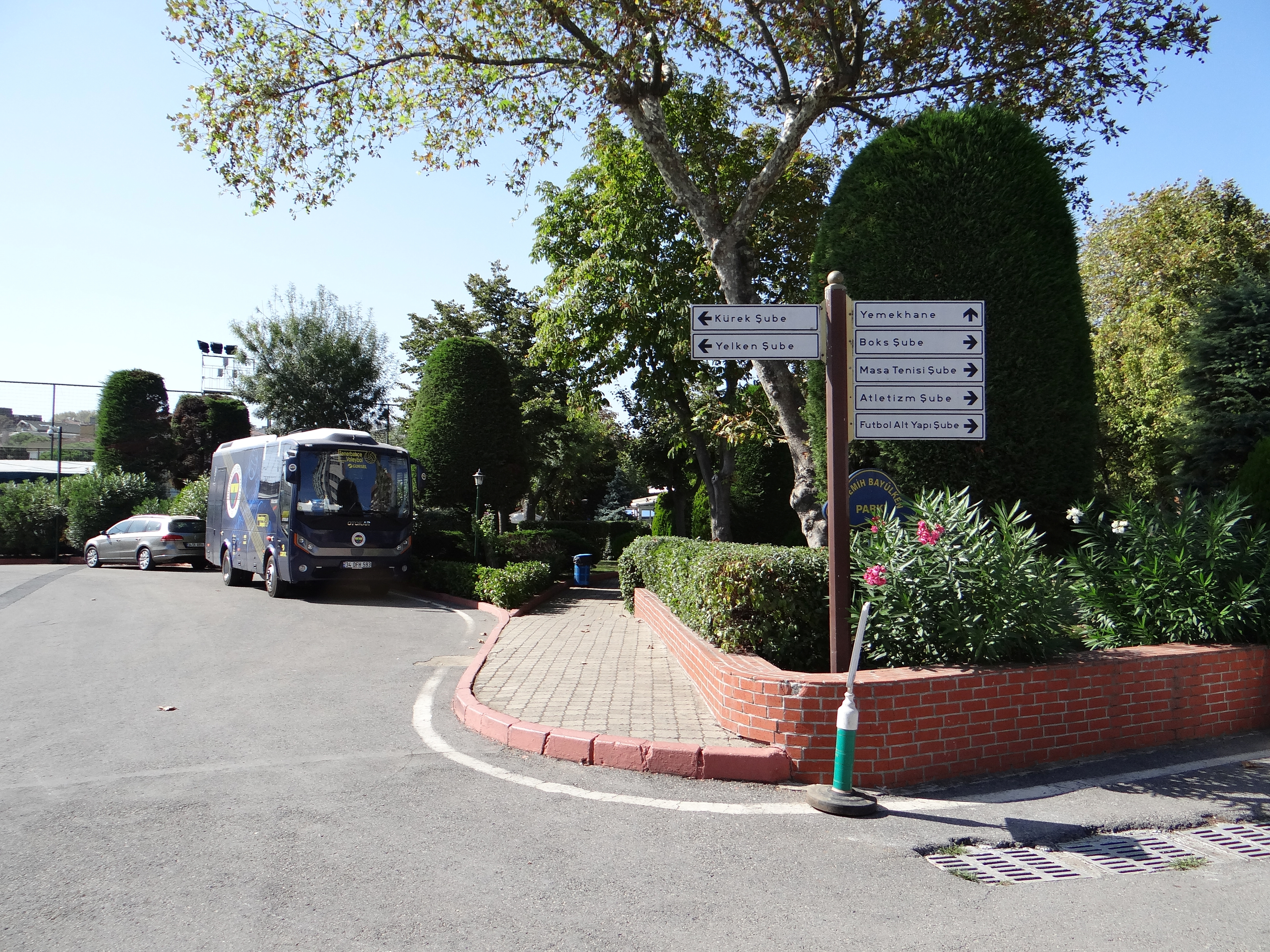
A view from the inside.

The sports complex serves as a venue for a number of sport sections such as athletics, boxing, men's football academy, rowing, sailing, table tennis as a training and camp site. It also has a cafeteria.

=== Fitness center ===
There is a fitness center with PVC flooring.

=== Football fields ===
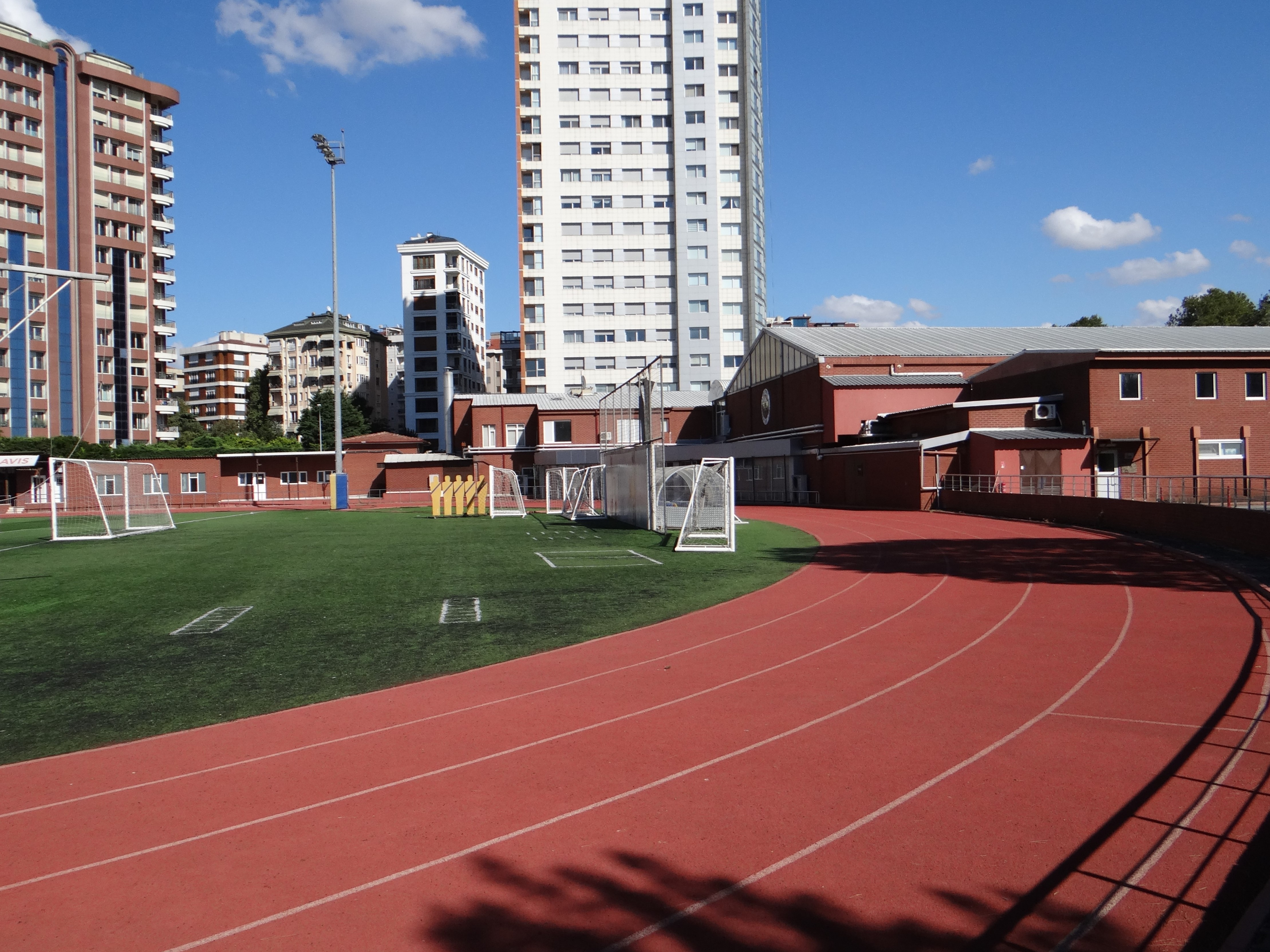
Football fields and Tartan track.

There are two football fields with artificial turf ground, both of 30 m × 50 m (98 ft × 164 ft) size. The fields are illuminated.

=== Football stadium ===
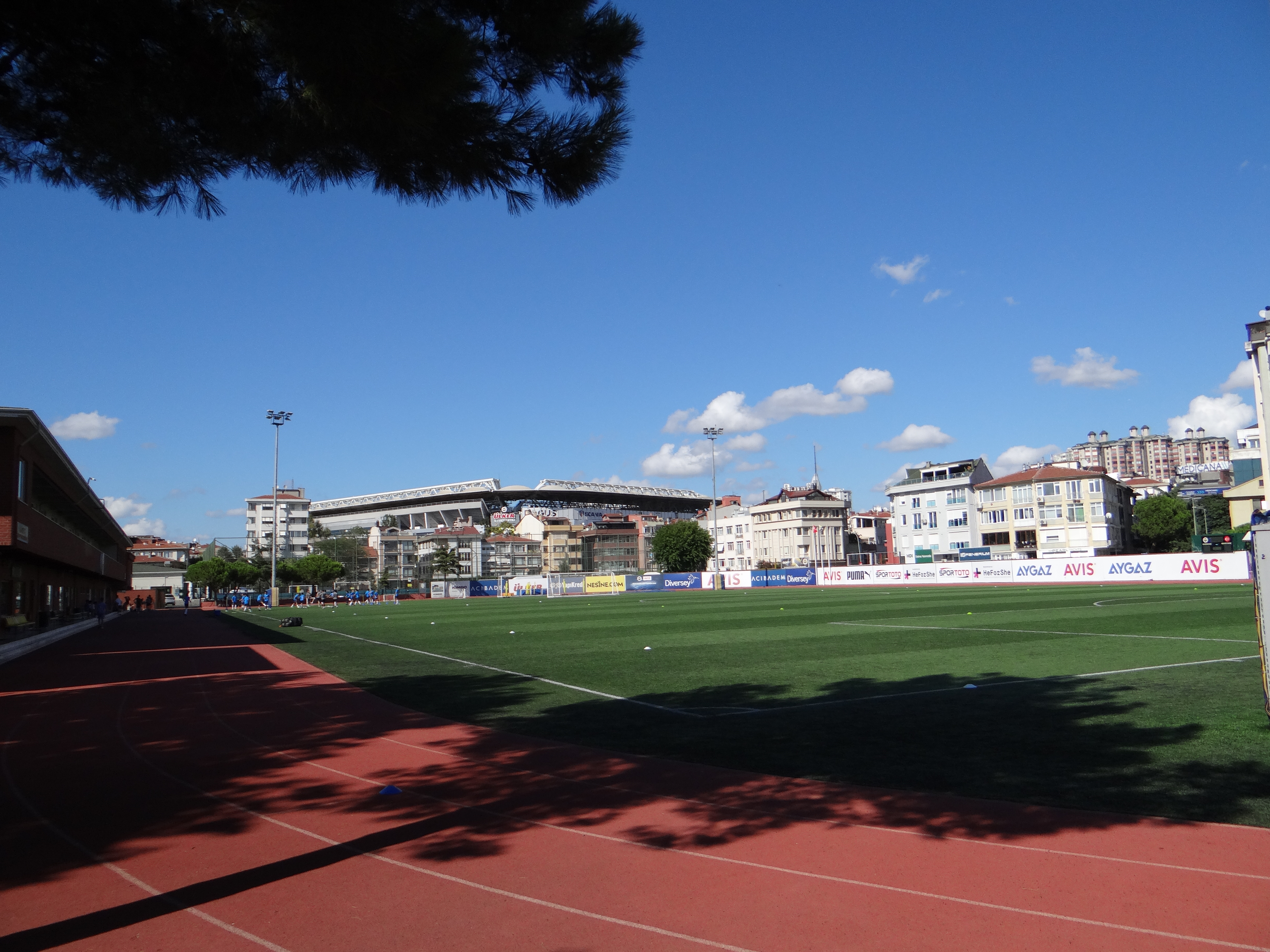
The stadium.

The stadium with the dimensions of 68 m × 105 m (223 ft × 344 ft) has an artificial turf ground, and is illuminated. It has a covered stand with 200 seats.

It is used for trainings of the Fenerbahçe S.K., teams, and is the home ground of Fenerbahçe women's football team starting with the semi-finals match of the 2022-23 Women's Super League season on 13 May 2024.

=== Sports hall ===
There is a hall for indoor sports with wood-parquet flooring court of 28 m × 15 m (92 ft × 49 ft).

=== Swimming pool ===
The open-air swimming pool is non-standard with a depth of 1.50 m (4 ft 11 in). It is illuminated.
