= Kireçburnu Spor =

Kireçburnu Spor Women's Football
- Full name: Kireçburnu Spor Kulübü Bayan Futbol Takımı
- Founded: 1951; 75 years ago
- Ground: Çayırbaşı Stadium
- Coordinates: 41°09′22″N 29°01′49″E
- Chairman: Biletçi Şadi
- Manager: (Turkey) AhmetYılmaz
- League: Turkish Women's Super League
- 2021–22: 12th (Group A)
Home colours	Away colours

Kireçburnu Spor Women's Football (Turkish: Kireçburnu Spor Kulübü Bayan Futbol Takımı) is a women's football team based in Kireçburnu, Sarıyer, Istanbul playing in the Turkish Women's First Football League. It was formed in 2010 as part of the 1951-established Football Club. Kireçburnu Spor is the only women's team among the 30 football clubs around in Sarıyer district. Club's current chairman is Yaşar Kalander.

The team finished the 2014–15 season in the Turkish Women's Second Football League as runners-up and was promoted to the Women's First League to play in the 2015–16 season.

== Colors ==
Kireçburnu Spor's colors are yellow and green.

== Stadium ==
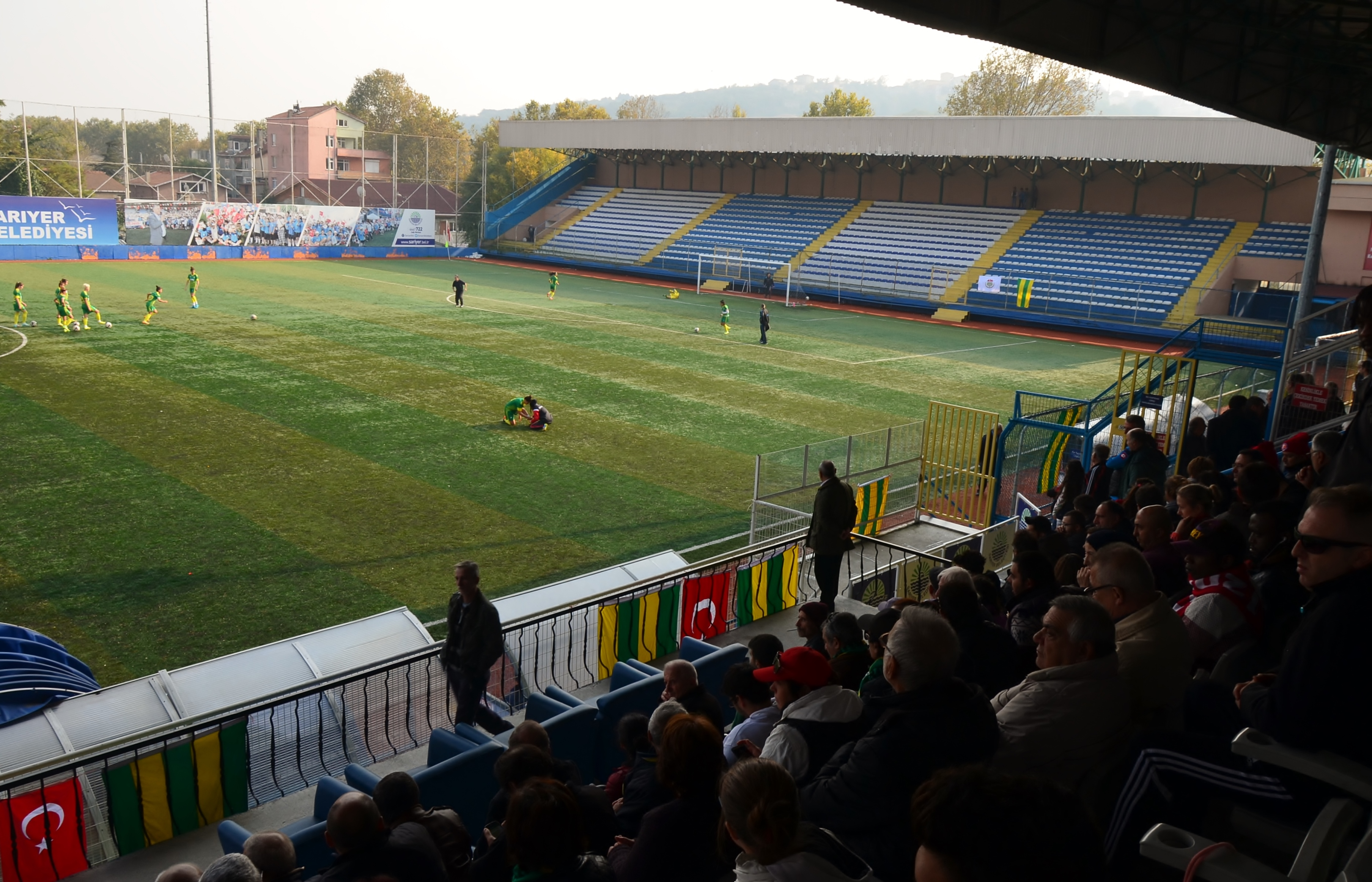
A view of the southern side of Çayırbaşı Stadium.

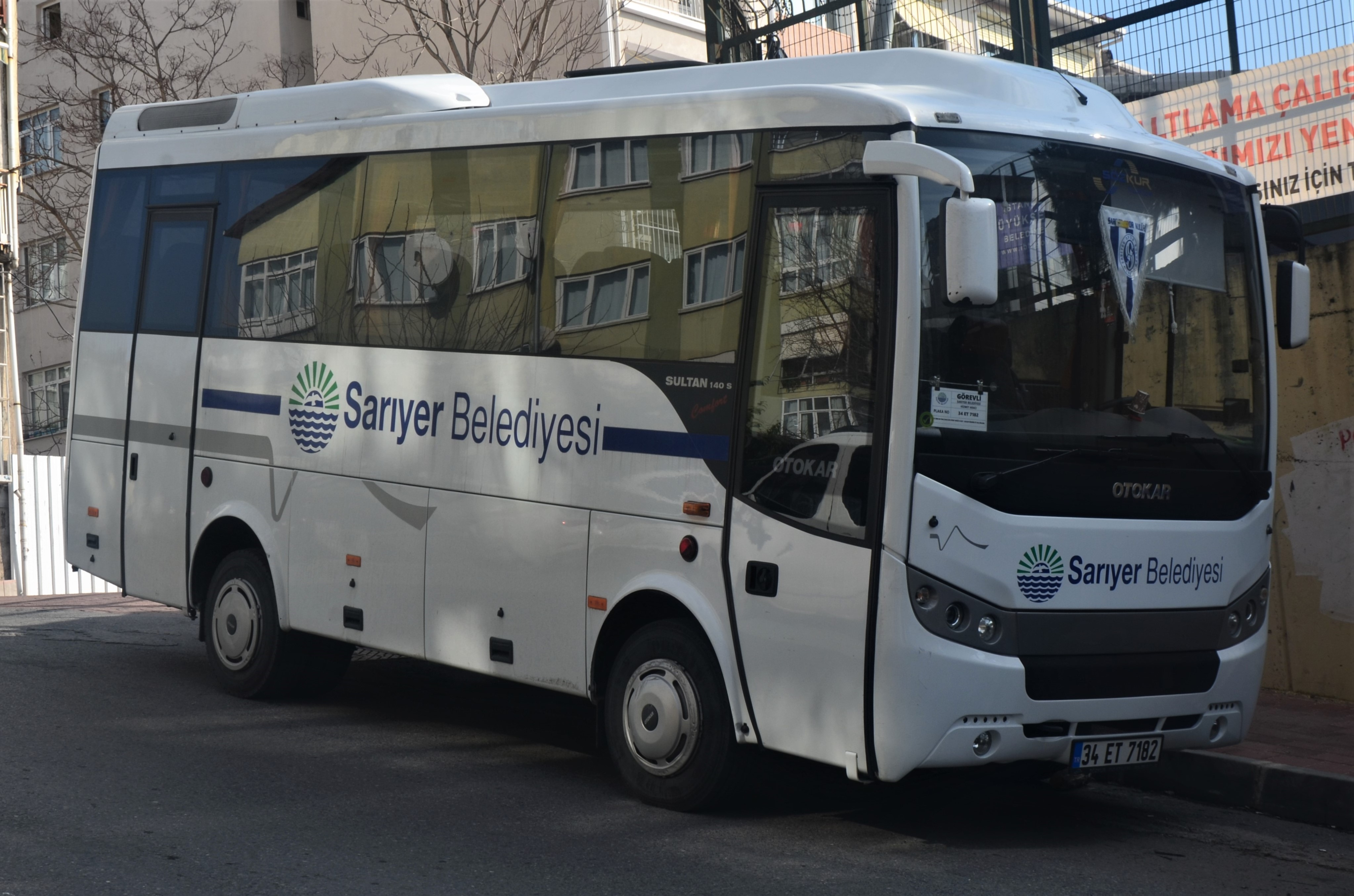
Team bus of Kireçburnu Spor.

The team play their home matches at the Çayırbaşı Stadium in Sarıyer.

== Statistics ==
As of 5 February 2023

Season	League	Rank	Pld	W	D	L	GF	GA	GD	Pts
2010–11	Regional League – Div. Marmara	3	10	3	2	5	29	32	−3	11
2011–12	Second League – Div. Marmara B	5	10	2	0	8	15	38	−23	6
2012–13	Second League – Div. 2	6	10	1	2	7	11	46	−35	5
2013–14	Second League – Div. 4	1	16	10	4	2	53	10	+43	34
2014–15	Second League	2	22	18	3	1	114	24	+90	37
2015–16	First League	5	18	10	2	6	65	20	+45	32
2016–17	First League	8	26	9	4	13	41	62	−21	31
2017–18	First League	5	18	9	1	8	28	47	−19	28
2018–19	First League	8	18	4	2	12	19	57	−38	14
2019–20	First League	8 (^{1})	14	4	1	9	18	51	−33	13
2020–21	First League Gr. C	10	3	1	0	2	6	15	−9	3
2021–22	Super League Gr. A	12 (^{2})	24	3	4	17	14	104	−90	12
2022–23	Super League Gr. B	10 (^{3})	15	0	0	15	8	130	−122	−3 (^{4})
Green marks a season followed by promotion, red a season followed by relegation.

- (^{1}): Season discontinued due to COVID-19 pandemic in Turkey
- (^{2}): Won the play-out
- (^{3}): Season in progress
- (^{4}). 3 penalty points due to not show-up in a match

== Transfers ==
After finishing the first half of the Women's Second League's 2014–15 season as leader, Kireçburnu Spor transferred Esra Özkan from Ataşehir Belediyespor and Gözde Sungur from Kdz. Ereğlispor. Following their promotion to the Women's First League, the club transferred Ezgi Çağlar, Çiğdem Belci from Ataşehir Belediyespor and Esra Erol, Yağmur Uraz from Konak Belediyespor. In the beginning of the 2015–16 league season, the club transferred another player from Ataşehir Belediyespor, the striker Merve Aladağ.

For the 2017–18 season, the club transferred seven players, among them three former members Merve Şıkkibar, Tuğba Babacan, and Beyza Kocatürk, and two players from Ataşehir Belediyespor Nagihan Avanaş and Hilal Çetinkaya, as well as one each from 1207 Antalya Spor Kübra Berber and from the Second League team Kocaeli Harb-İş the goalkeeper Seda İnci. On the other hand, the players Serenay Öziri, Ecem Cebeci, Kardelen Duran, Özge Çamurcu and Cansel Gözüaçık left the team.

In the 2021–22 Super League season, Faezeh Esfahanian, Hananeh Aminghashghay and Maryam Izadpanah from Iran were transferred, who played in the first half season only.

== Current squad ==
As of 28 January 2023

- Head coach:

Note: Flags indicate national team as defined under FIFA eligibility rules; some limited exceptions apply. Players may hold more than one non-FIFA nationality.

No.	Pos.	Nation	Player
3		TUR	Şİremnur Çehre
12		TUR	Nursena Kurt
13		TUR	Sinem Şimşek
15		TUR	Ada Tuana Kurt
16	GK	TUR	=Büşra Çelikol
17		TUR	Lal Hira Göven
18		TUR	Esma Nur Çap

No.	Pos.	Nation	Player
20		TUR	Sila Bayrak
28		TUR	Miray Aydemir
29		TUR	Emine Kambur
52		TUR	Türkan Sivri
60		TUR	Sarenur Toptaş
61		TUR	Yağmur Büyükhan
77		TUR	Emel Gül

== Kit history ==
2015–16 home	2016–17 home	2016–17 away	2017–18 home	2018–19 home	2019–20 home
2021–22 home

== Squad history ==
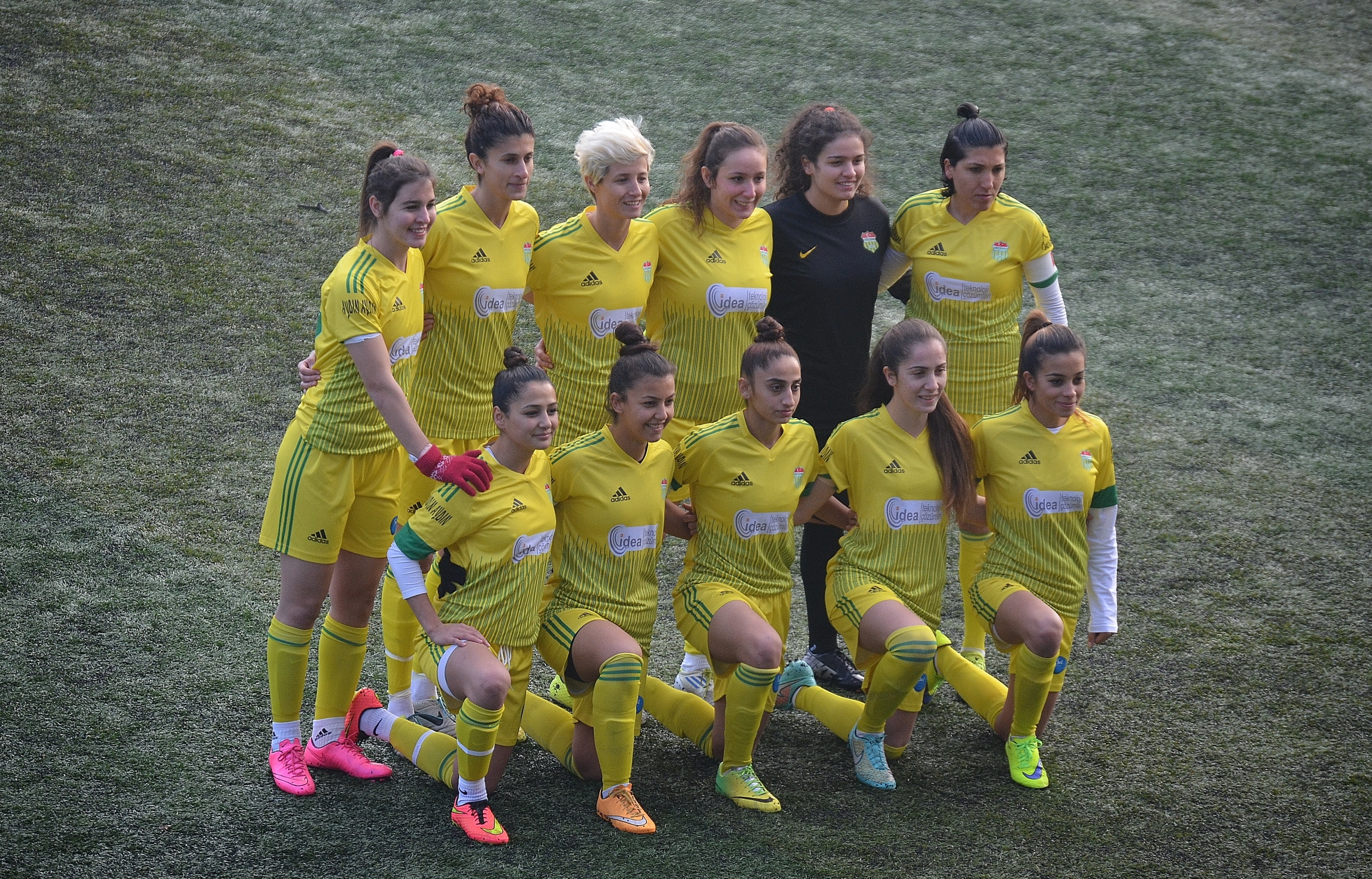
Kireçburnu Spor squad in a 2015–16 Women's First League season's home match.

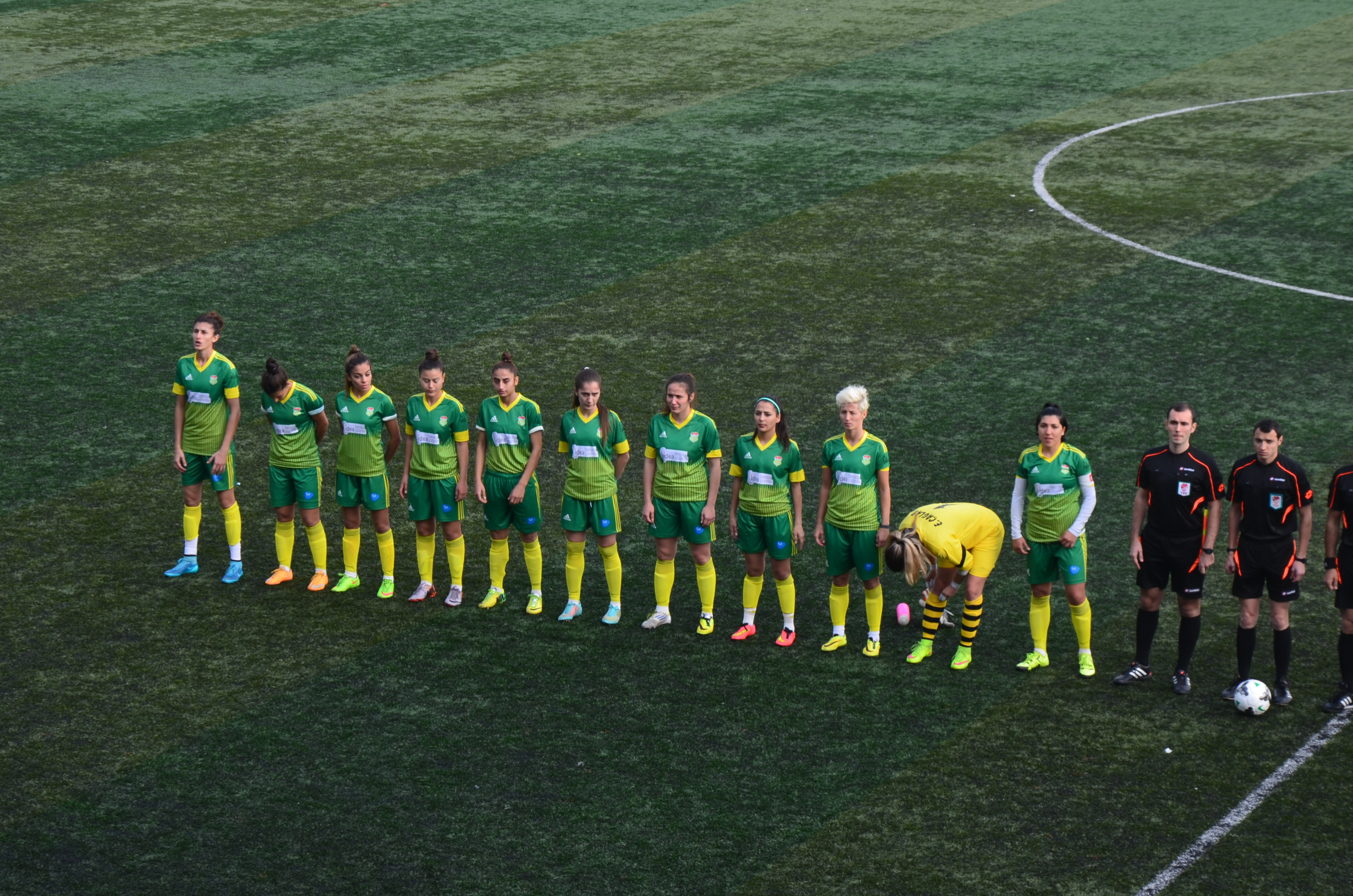
Kireçburnu Spor squad in a 2016–17 Women's First League season's home match.

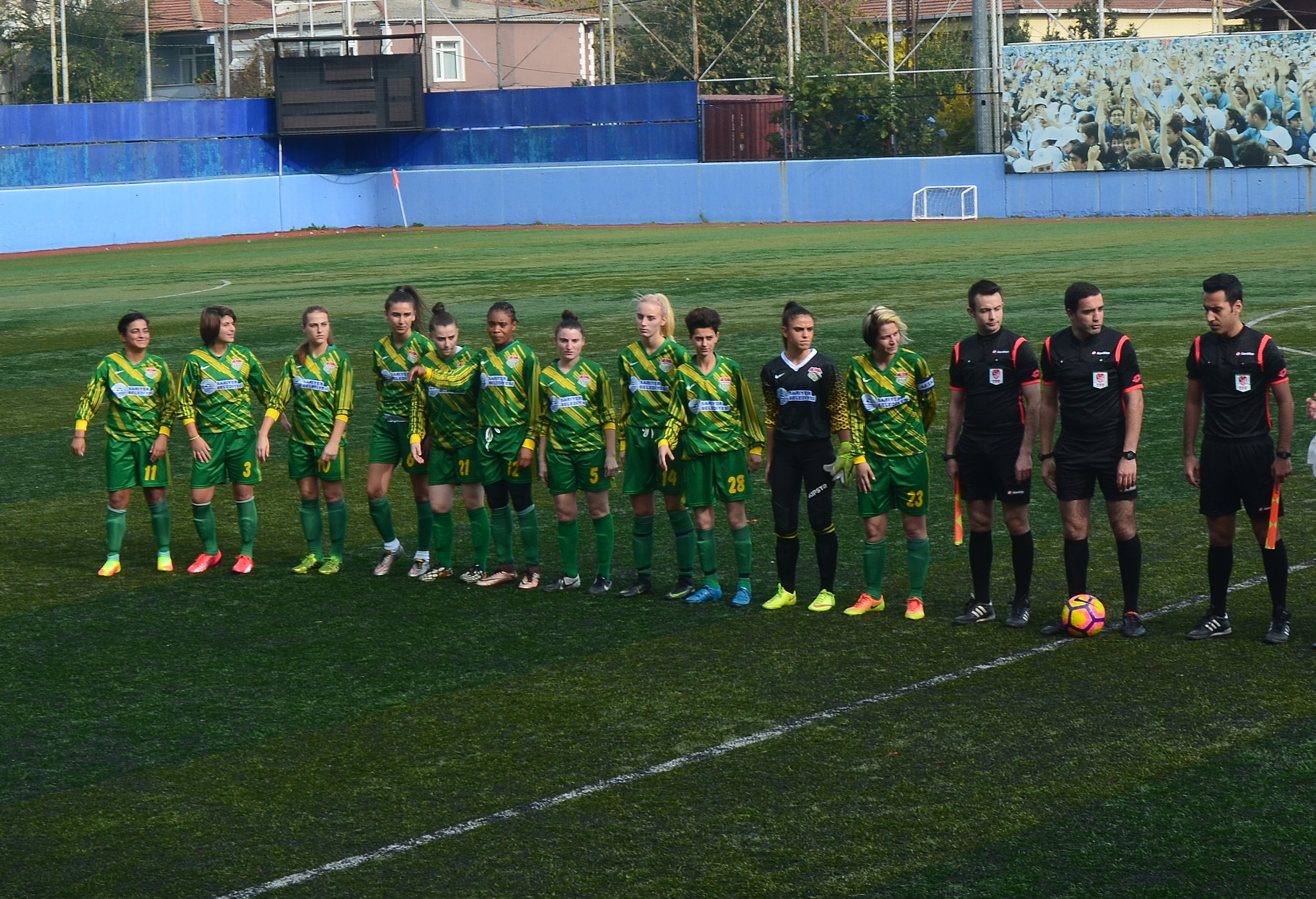
Kireçburnu Spor squad in a 2017–18 Women's First League season's home match.

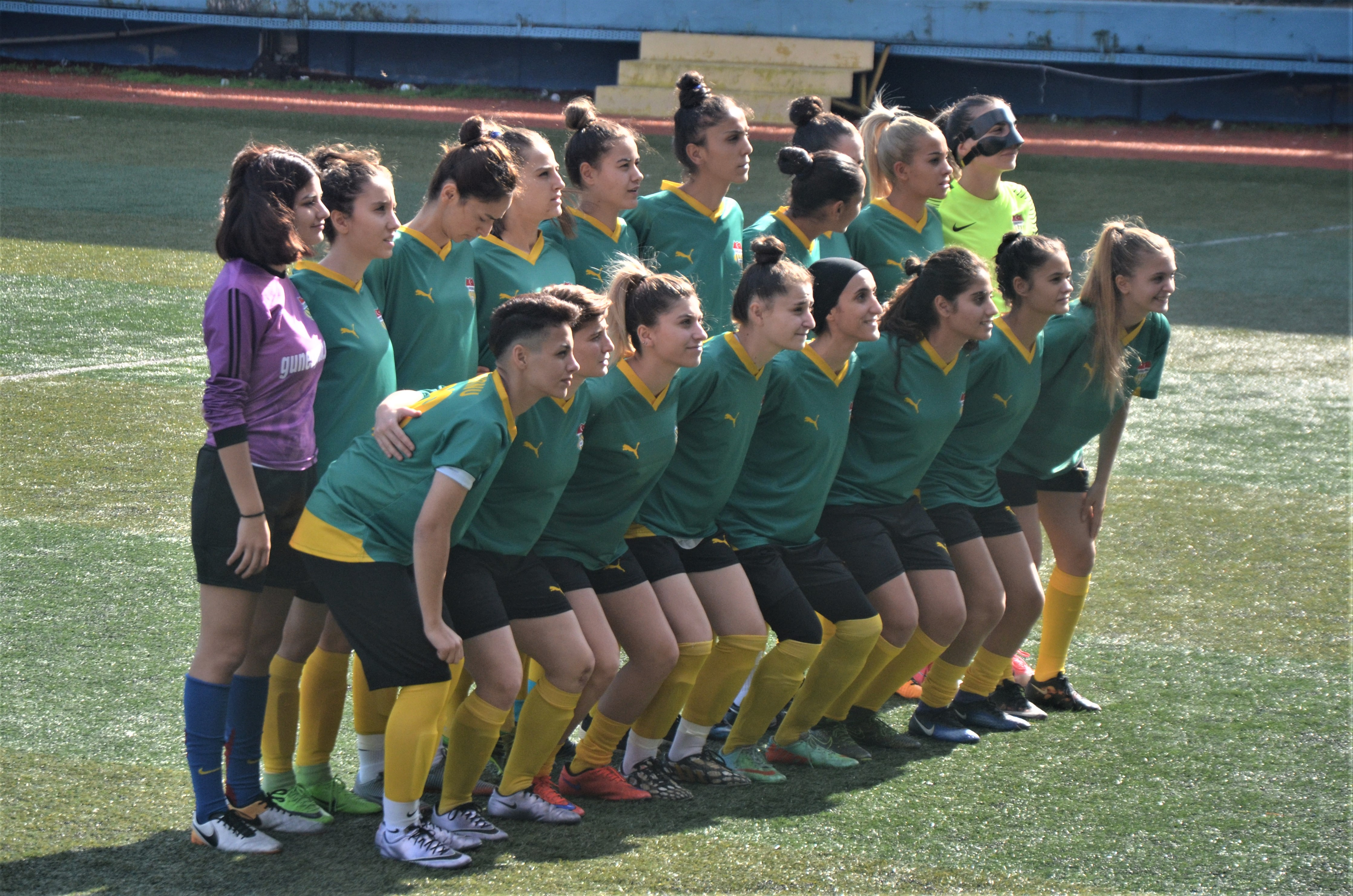
Kireçburnu Spor squad in the 2018–19 Women's First League.

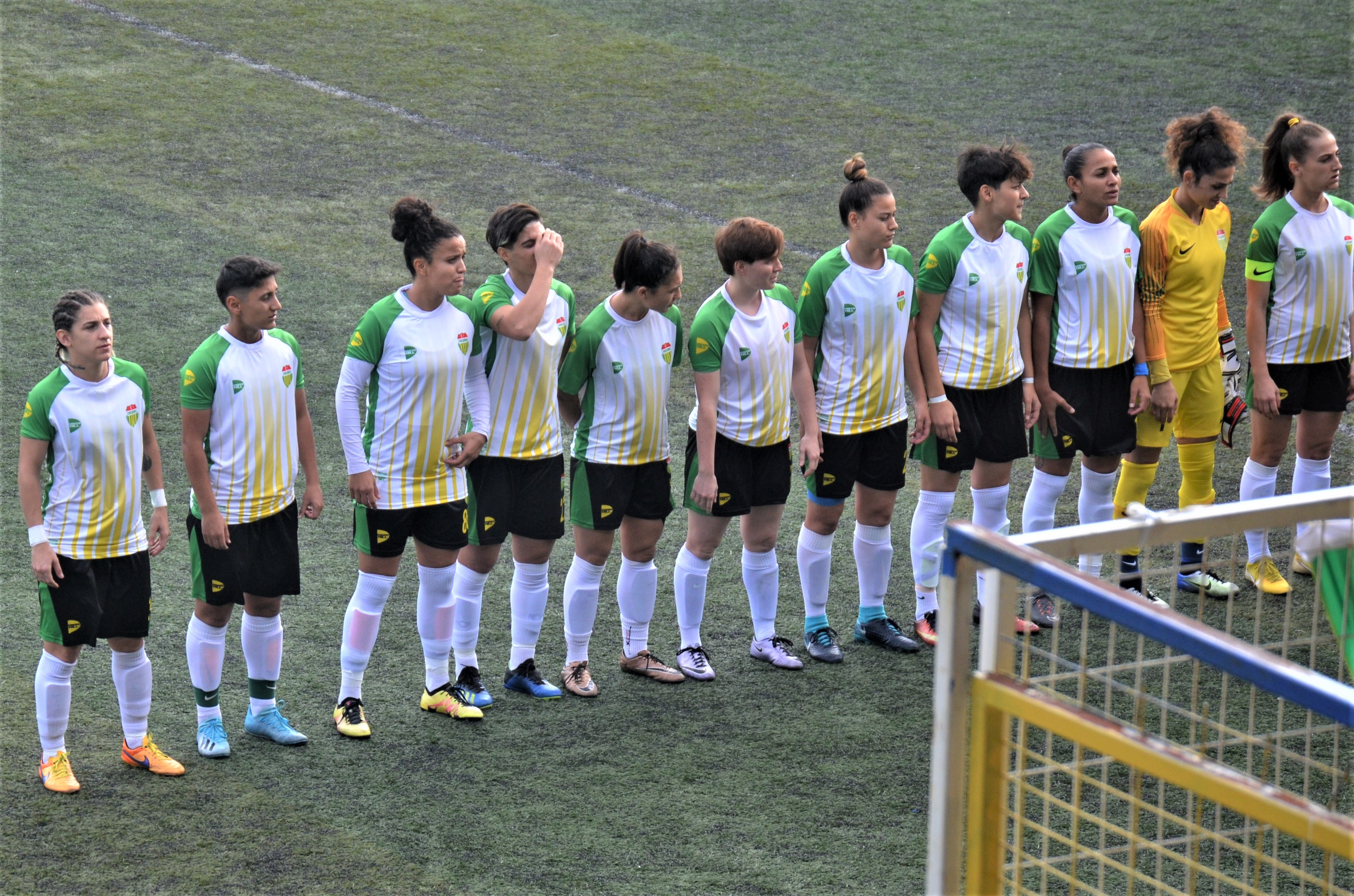
Kireçburnu Spor squad in the 2019-20 Women's First league.
