= Beyza Kocatürk =

Turkish footballer (born 1996)

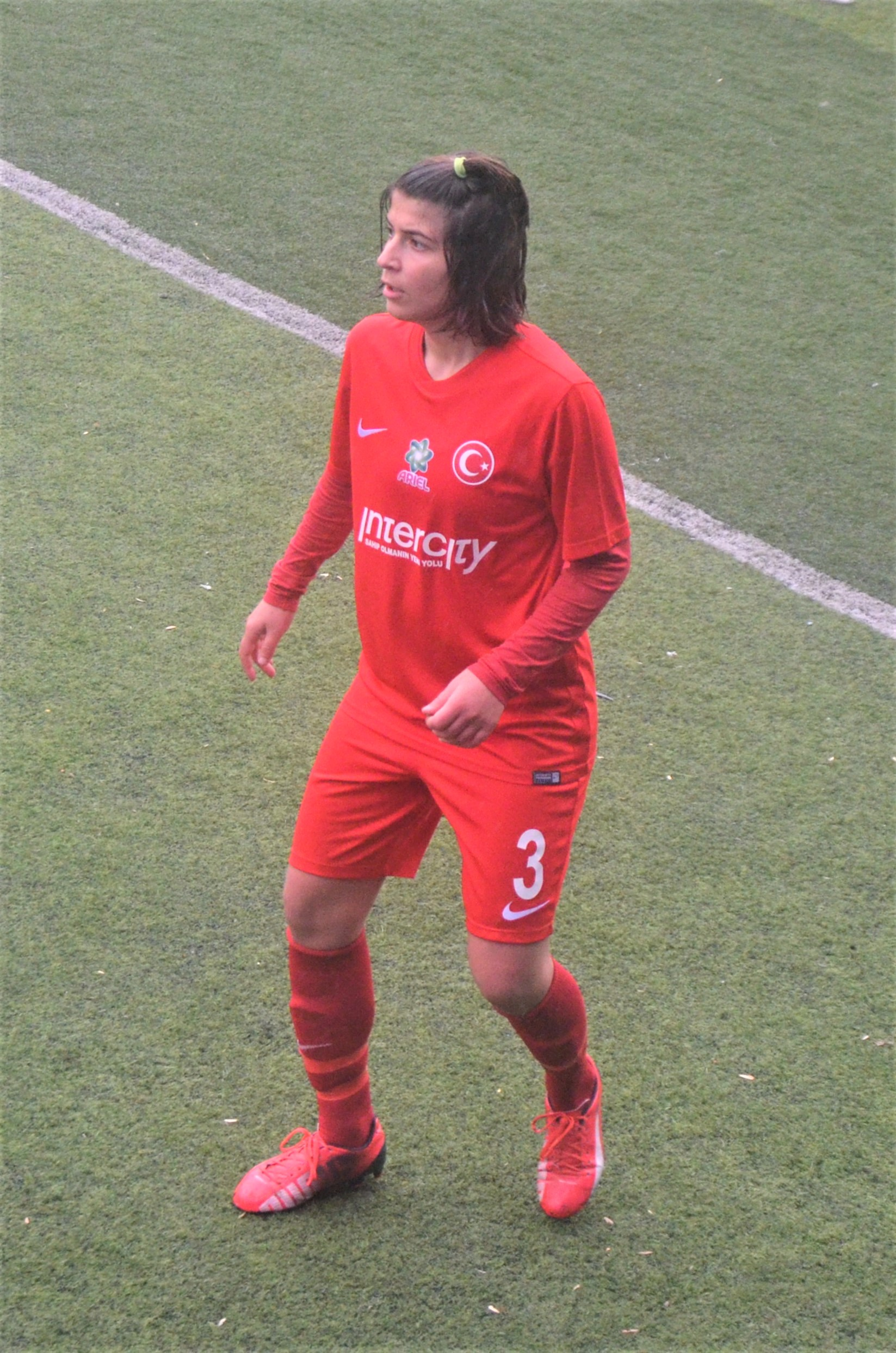
- Beyza Kocatürk of Ataşehir Belediyespor in the 2018-19 Turkish Women's First Football League.

Personal information
- Date of birth: 9 December 1996 (age 29)
- Place of birth: İzmit, Turkey
- Position: Defender

Team information
- Current team: Bakırköy Kadın
- Number: 41

Senior career*
Years	Team	Apps	(Gls)
2008–2009	İzmit Saraybahçe BS	4	(0)
2009–2012	İzmit Belediyespor	49	(11)
2012–2013	İzmit Çenesuyu Plajyolu S	10	(1)
2013–2014	Karşıyaka Koleji Spor	7	(0)
2014–2015	Kireçburnu	21	(11)
2015–2018	Trabzon İdmanocağı	42	(3)
2018–2019	Ataşehir	13	(0)
2019–2021	Fatih Vatan	17	(0)
2021–2023	ALG	29	(0)
2023–2025	Ankara BB Fomget	28	(0)
2025–2026	Yüksekova	21	(1)
2026–	Bakırköy Kadın	2	(0)

International career^{‡}
2011–2013	Turkey U-17	15	(0)
2014–2015	Turkey U-19	4	(0)
2021	Turkey	1	(0)
- * Club domestic league appearances and goals as of 23 October 2026 ‡ National team caps and goals as of 15 July 2021

Beyza Kocatürk (born 9 December 1996) is a Turkish women's football defender currently playing in the Women's Super League for Bakırköy Kadın with jersey number 41. She played for the national girls' U-17 and the women's U-19 teams, before she became a member of the Turkey women's team.

== Club career ==
Beyza Kocatürk received her license for her hometown club İzmit Saratbajçe Belediyespor on 10 June 2008. After one season, she transferred to İzmit Belediyespor, where she played three seasons from 2009 to 2012. She was later with İzmit Çenesuyu Plajyoluspor, Karşıyaka Koleji Spor and Kireçburnu Spor for one season. In the 2015–16 season, Kocatürk joined Trabzon İdmanocağı to play in the First League again after three seasons. After two seasons with Trabzon İdmanocağı, she returned for the first half of the 2017–18 season to her former club Kireçburnu Spor in the 2017–18 league season. For the second half of that season, Kocatürk joined Trabzon İdmanocağı again.

In the 2018–19 league season, she transferred to Ataşehir Belediyespor.

By October 2019, she signed with Fatih Vatan Spor. Her team finished the 2020–21 Women's First League season as runner-up after losing to Beşiktaş J.K. in the final.

In the 2021–22 Women'per League season, she transferred to ALG Spor. She enjoyed her team's league champion title. On 18 August 2022, she debuted in the 2022–23 UEFA Women's Champions League.

In August 2023, Kocatürk moved to Ankara BB Fomget. In that season, she became runners-up, and she won the champions title in the 2024–25 season.

In September 2025, she transferred to Yüksekova in Hakkari, which was promoted to the Super League in the 2025–26.

For the 2026–27 Women's Super League season, she joined the newly promoted Istanbul-based club Bakırköy Kasın.

== International career ==
Kocatürk debuted for the Turkey girls' U-17 team at the 2012 UEFA Women's Under-17 Championship qualification round match against Serbia. She took part at the 2012 UEFA Women's Under-17 Development Cup match against Azerbaijan.

She played for the national women's U-19 team at the 2015 UEFA Women's Under-19 Championship qualification round match against Kazakhstan. She took part at the 2015 UEFA Women's Under-19 Championship qualification match against Italy.

== Career statistics ==
As of 23 October 2026.

Club	Season	League			Continental		National		Total	
Club	Season	Division	Apps	Goals	Apps	Goals	Apps	Goals	Apps	Goals
İzmit Saraybahçe Belediyespor	2008–09	Second League	4	0	–	–	0	0	4	0
İzmit Belediyespor	2009–10	Regional League	8	0	–	–	0	0	8	0
İzmit Belediyespor	2010–11	Second League	19	6	–	–	2	0	21	6
İzmit Belediyespor	2011–12	First League	22	5	–	–	5	0	27	5
İzmit Belediyespor	Total		49	11	–	–	7	0	56	11
İzmit Çenesuyu Plajyoluspor	2012–13	Second League	10	1	–	–	8	0	18	1
Karşıyaka Koleji Spor	2013–14	Second League	7	0	–	–	2	0	9	0
Kireçburnu	2014–15	Second League	21	11	–	–	2	0	23	11
Trabzon İdmanocağı	2015–16	First League	9	1	–	–	0	0	9	1
Trabzon İdmanocağı	2016–17	First League	21	2	–	–	0	0	21	2
Trabzon İdmanocağı	2017–18	First League	12	0	–	–	0	0	12	0
Trabzon İdmanocağı	Total		42	3	–	–	0	0	42	3
Ataşehir	2018–19	First League	13	0	–	–	0	0	13	0
Fatih Vatan	2019–20	First League	11	0	–	–	0	0	11	0
Fatih Vatan	2020–21	First League	6	0	–	–	0	0	6	0
Fatih Vatan	Total		17	0	–	–	0	0	17	0
ALG	2021–22	Super League	16	0	–	–	1	0	21	0
ALG	2022–23	Super League	13	0	1	0	0	0	14	0
ALG	Total		29	0	1	0	1	0	30	0
nkara BB Fomget	2023–24	Super League	21	0	–	–	0	0	21	0
nkara BB Fomget	2024–25	Super League	7	0	–	–	0	0	7	0
nkara BB Fomget	Total		28	0	–	–	0	0	28	0
Yüksekova	2025–26	Super League	21	1	–	–	0	0	21	1
Bakırköy Kafın	2026–27	Super League	2	0	–	–	0	0	2	0
Career total			243	27	1	0	20	0	264	27

== Honours ==
Turkish Women's Super League

Ankara BB Fomget
Champions (1): 2024–25
Runners-up (1): 2023–24

Turkish Women's First League

Fatih Vatan
Runners-up (1): 2020–21
ALG
Champions (1): 2021–22

Turkish Women's Second League

İzmit Belediyespor
Champions (1): 2011–12
