= Bakırköy Kadın FSK =

- Full name: Bakırköy Kadın Futbol Spor Kulübü
- Founded: 2022; 4 years ago
- Ground: Bakırköy Atatürk Yaşam Köyü Sports Facility
- Coordinates: 40.999125°N 28.883307°E
- Chairman: Ali Özdemir
- Manager: Göksel Aşan
- League: Turkish Women's Super League

Bakırköy Kadın FSK (Turkish: Bakırköy Kadın Futbol Spor Kulübü) is a women's football club based at Bakırköy district in Istanbul Province, Turkey playing in the Turkish Women's Football Super League.

== History ==
In the beginning of the 2022–23 season, Beşiktaş J.K. signed a feeder team agreement, which included that Bakırköy Yenimahalle will be composed of the players of Beşiktaş women's U17 team. After winning a play-in match, the team started to play in the new established fourth-tier Women's Third League.

Bakırköy women's football team was promoted to the third-tier Women'!s Second League for the 2023–24 season.

Originally named Bakırköy Yenimahalle Futbol Kulübü and sponsored by the local Carousel Shopping Center, it was renamed to Bakırköy Kadın Futbol Spor Kulübü after the 2024–25 Women's Second League season.

Bakırköy Yenimahalle completed the Group D matches of the 2024–25 Women's Second League season on the third place. After becoming runners-up in the play-off, they were promoted to the womne's First League for the next season.

Bakırköy Kadın finished the Group B of the 2025–26 Turkish Women's First League season as leader. They were promoted to the Super League as the First League champion after defeating the Group A leader, Kayseri Kadın, by 5-0 in the play-offs. Before the beginning of the 2026–27 Women's Super League season, Ali Özdemir was selected as the new club president in August 2026, and Tuğba Çömlekçioğlu as vice president.

== Club name history ==
- Bakırköy Yenimahalle Futbol Kulübü (2022–23, 2023–24)
- Carousel Bakırköy Yenimahalle Futbol Kulübü (2024–25)
- Bakırköy Kadın Futbol Spor Kulübü (2025–26, 2026–27)

== Stadium ==
Bakırköy Kadın play their home matches at the football fields in the Bakırköy Atatürk Yaşam Köyü Sports Facility.

== Statistics ==
As of 1 November 2026.

Season	League	Rank	Pld	W	D	L	GF	GA	GD	Pts
2022–23	Play-in		1	0	0	2	0	+2	3	
2022–23	ThirdLeague Gr. 2	1	8	5	3	0	31	2	+29	18
2022–23	Play-offs		3	2	0	1	7	6	+1	6
2023–24	Second League Gr. A	3	14	7	3	4	33	25	+8	24
2024–25	Second League Gr. D	3	16	12	1	3	64	16	+48	37
2024–25	Play-offs	2	8	5	2	1	21	15	+6	17
2025–26	First League Gr. B	1	16	13	2	1	58	10	+48	41
2025–26	Play-offs	1	1	1	1	0	5	0	+5	3
2026–27	Super League	14	9 (Note: Season in progress)	1	0	8	10	25	-15	0 (Note: 3 points deducted by the decision of the Federation)
Green marks a season followed by promotion, red a season followed by relegation.

- Legend:

== Current squad ==
As of 17 October 2026.

- Head coach: (Turkey) Göksel Aşan

Note: Flags indicate national team as defined under FIFA eligibility rules; some limited exceptions apply. Players may hold more than one non-FIFA nationality.

No.	Pos.	Nation	Player
1	GK	AUS	Shivani Battaglia
18	GK	TUR	Lara Karaca
2	DF	TUR	Betül Birgül Karaca
3	DF	TUR	Hanife Zeynep Biriz
33	DF	TUR	Ecrin Naz Şentürk
41	DF	TUR	Beyza Kocatürk
6	MF	TUR	Ece Aydın
7	MF	TUR	İmren Akkaya
8	MF	TUR	Nehir Aydın

No.	Pos.	Nation	Player
10	MF	TUR	Gizem Aydın
12	MF	TUR	Helin Erbulun
13	MF	TUR	Sibel Duman
14	MF	NGR	Yetunde Ayantosho
16	MF	TUR	Cemile Beril Günay
23	MF	TUR	İsmigül Yalçınar
9	FW	TUR	Gülüşan Yavuz
15	FW	TUR	Beyza Nur Kurnaz
17		TUR	Kübra Altıntaş
