= Fatma Şakar =

Turkish-German footballer (born 1999)

Personal information
- Date of birth: 26 March 1999 (age 27)
- Place of birth: Karlsruhe, Germany
- Height: 1.64 m (5 ft 4 1/2 in)
- Position: Defender

Team information
- Current team: Fenerbahçe
- Number: 24

Youth career
- SpVgg Durlach-Aue

Senior career*
Years	Team	Apps	(Gls)
2016–2020	TSG Hoffenheim II	69	(2)
2020–2022	Sand	19	(0)
2022–2024	Leipzig	28	(0)
2024–2026	Union Berlin	17	(0)
2026–	Fenerbahçe	8	(0)

International career^{‡}
2013–2014	Germany U15	3	(1)
2014–2015	Germany U16	9	(0)
2015–2016	Germany U17	5	(0)
2017–2018	Germany U19	8	(0)
2024–	Turkey	10	(0)
- * Club domestic league appearances and goals as of 17:15, 21 November 2026 (UTC) ‡ National team caps and goals as of 17:45, 9 October 2026 (UTC)

Fatma Şakar (born 26 March 1999) is a professional footballer who plays as a defender for Turkish Women's Super League club Fenerbahçe. Born in Germany, she plays for the Turkey national team.

== Personal life ==
Fatma Şakar was born in Karlsruhe, Germany on 26 March 1999.

She studied Sociology with minor in Psychology at the University of Mannheim, and graduated with a title Bachelor in March 2022.

== Club career ==
Şakar is 1.64 m (5 ft 4 1/2 in) tall and plays as defender.

Şakar started her career at the local club SpVgg Durlach-Aue in her hometown Karlsruhe. She then transferred to 1899 Hoffenheim II, where she played from 2016 to 2020, and scored two goals in 69 matches. For the 2020–21 Frauen-Bundesliga season, she moved to Sand in Willstätt. She played also the next season, and capped in 19 games. After two seasons, she joined Leipzig to play in the 2022–23 2. Frauen-Bundesliga season. At the end of the season, her team was promoted to the Frauen Bundesliga. She appeared in 28 matches. In the second half of the 2023–24 Frauen-Bundesliga season, she terminated her contract prematurely and transferred to the Union Berlin in the Frauen-Regionalliga. The team made it to the 2. Frauen-Bundesliga at the end of the season. On 20 July 2026, Şakar moved to the Turkish top-flight club Fenerbahçe in the Turkish Women's Super League, where she signed a one-year contract.

== International career ==
=== Germany ===
Şakar played for the German national youth teams U15 (2013–2014), U16 (2014–2015), U17 (2015–2016) and U19 (2017–2018). She capped in total 25 times.

=== Turkey ===
Şakar was called up to the Turkey national team end June 2024, and attended the national team's training camp in July 2024 for preparations to the European Championship qualifying. She debuted in the UEFA Women's Euro 2025 qualifying play-offs match against Ukraine on 29 October 2024. In 2025, she took part at the UEFA Women's Nations League B2 tournament.

== Career statistics ==
=== International ===
As of match played 9 June 2026

Appearances and goals by national team and year
National team	Year	Apps	Goals
Turkey
Turkey	2024	1	0
Turkey	2025	3	0
Turkey	2026	6	0
Total		10	0

== Honours ==
RB Leipzig

- 2. Frauen-Bundesliga: 2022–23

Union Berlin

- 2. Frauen-Bundesliga: 2024–25
