= 2021–22 Galatasaray S.K. (women's football) season =

Galatasaray Hepsiburada
2021–22 season
- Chairman: Burak Elmas
- Head coach: Nurcan Çelik
- Stadium: Yeşilova Kemal Aktaş Stadı
- Turkish Women's Football Super League: Group B, 6th
- Top goalscorer: League: Elanur Laçın (6); All: Elanur Laçın (6)

The 2021–22 season was the first season of the women's football team of Galatasaray Sports Club.

== Overview ==
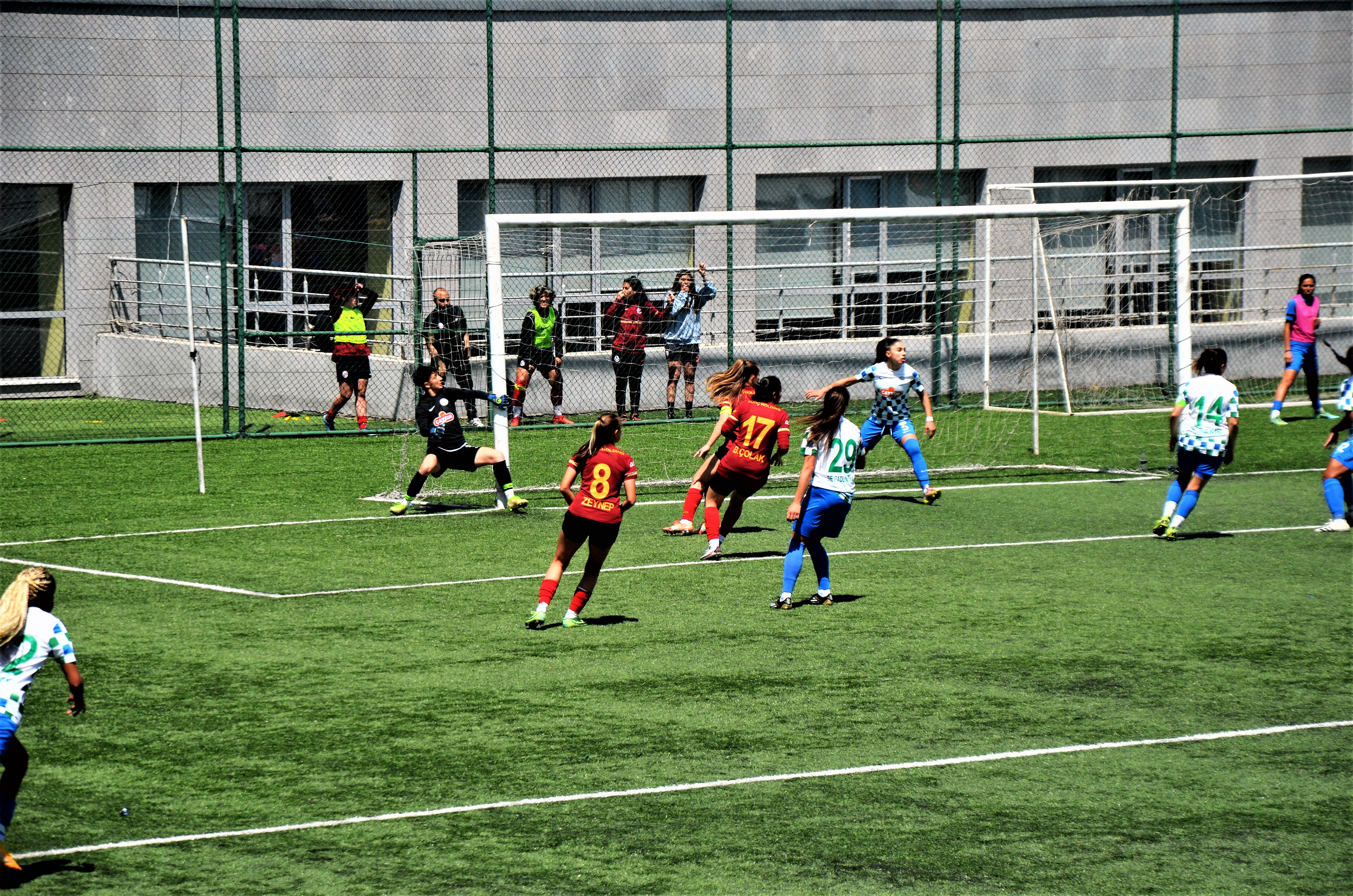
Galatasaray (red/yellow) vs Çaykur Rizespor (white/blue) in the 2021-22 Turkish Women's Football Super League.

=== September 2021 ===
On 18 September 2021, the Galatasaray Women's Football Team was introduced at the event held at Galatasaray High School. Before the launch, President Burak Elmas came to class 12 F, where the decision to establish Galatasaray Sports Club was taken, together with Galatasaray High School Manager Murat Develioğlu and signed the founding text of our women's football team.

Nurcan Çelik was appointed as the Technical Director of Galatasaray Women's Football Team on 24 September 2021.

=== October 2021 ===
Galatasaray Women's Football Team, which was founded at Galatasaray High School and will be among the teams that will compete in the Super League this year, stepped into Florya Metin Oktay Facilities for the first time on 7 October 2021.

== Kits ==
- Supplier: Nike
- Name sponsor: Hepsiburada
- Main sponsor: Hepsiburada

- Back sponsor: Tunç Holding
- Sleeve sponsor: Arzum

- Short sponsor: —
- Socks sponsor: Tacirler

Home

Away

Third

Goalkeeper 1

Goalkeeper 2

== Squad information ==
As of 1 May 2022

No.	Name	Nat	Since	Date of birth (age)	Signed from
Goalkeepers
1	Evin Dinçer	(Turkey)	2021	18 October 2003 (age 22)	(Turkey) Rüzgarlıbahçe İdman Yurdu Spor
25	Büşra Kenet	(Turkey)	2021	27 June 2000 (age 26)	(Turkey) Fatih Vatan Spor
32	Gamze Nur Yaman	(Turkey)	2022	25 April 1999 (age 27)	(Ukraine) WFC Zhytlobud-2 Kharkiv
66	Sude Nur Sözüdoğru	(Turkey)	2021	10 June 2002 (age 24)	(Turkey) Horozkent Spor
Defenders
2	İrem Barut	(Turkey)	2022	8 October 2004 (age 21)	(Turkey) Yukatel Kayserispor
3	İlayda Uğur	(Turkey)	2021	9 July 1999 (age 27)	(Turkey) Akdeniz Nurçelik Spor
4	Yaren Çetin	(Turkey)	2021	17 September 1999 (age 26)	(Turkey) Akdeniz Nurçelik Spor
5	Zeynep Nisa Üner	(Turkey)	2021	13 May 2002 (age 24)	(Turkey) Beşiktaş
6	Cemre Kara	(Turkey)	2021	29 September 2001 (age 24)	(Turkey) Akdeniz Nurçelik Spor
22	Ijeoma Queenth Daniels	(Nigeria)	2021	25 September 1992 (age 33)	(Turkey) Adana İdman Yurdu
23	Fadime Kurnaz	(Turkey)	2021	10 July 1997 (age 29)	(Turkey) Akdeniz Nurçelik Spor
44	Milica Denda	(Serbia)	2021	11 December 2002 (age 23)	(Serbia) ŽFK Spartak Subotica
61	İlayda Gündoğdu	(Turkey)	2021	23 February 2002 (age 24)	(Turkey) Kireçburnu Spor
Midfielders
8	Zeynep Ece Güneş	(Turkey)	2021	23 October 2004 (age 21)	(Turkey) Kireçburnu Spor
10	İsmigül Yalçıner (captain)	(Turkey)	2021	20 October 1994 (age 31)	(Turkey) Kireçburnu Spor
11	Elif Kesgin	(Turkey)	2021	17 August 2001 (age 25)	(Turkey) Kireçburnu Spor
13	Birgül Sadıkoğlu	(Turkey)	2022	23 March 2000 (age 26)	(Ukraine) WFC Zhytlobud-1 Kharkiv
16	Zehra Yılmaz	(Turkey)	2022	5 July 2002 (age 24)	(Turkey) Bursa Soğanlı Spor
17	Buse Çolak	(Turkey)	2021	13 March 1997 (age 29)	(Turkey) Kireçburnu Spor
19	Gözde Gül	(Turkey)	2021	12 June 1993 (age 33)	(Turkey) Akdeniz Nurçelik Spor
21	Didem Dülber	(Turkey)	2021	21 March 2001 (age 25)	(Turkey) ALG Spor
24	Arzu Akkurt	(Turkey)	2021	1 July 2004 (age 22)	(Turkey) 1207 Antalya Spor
33	Serpil Özer	(Turkey)	2021	3 March 2001 (age 25)	(Turkey) Akdeniz Nurçelik Spor
67	Gülhanım Doğan	(Turkey)	2021	25 August 2003 (age 23)	(Turkey) Kireçburnu Spor
77	Amanda Ferreira de Alencar	(Brazil)	2021	11 January 1998 (age 28)	
78	Angie Sandrith Telles Ortiz	(Colombia)	2021	21 August 1994 (age 32)	(Colombia) CA Bucaramanga
99	Samia Adam	(Egypt)	2021	19 April 1996 (age 30)	(Egypt) El Gouna FC
Forwards
7	Erva Karaovalı	(Turkey)	2022	22 March 2002 (age 24)	(Turkey) Kocaeli Bayan FK
9	Elanur Laçın	(Turkey)	2021	4 August 2004 (age 22)	(Turkey) Kireçburnu Spor
14	Dajana Spasojević	(Bosnia and Herzegovina)	2022	29 October 1997 (age 28)	(Ukraine) WFC Zhytlobud-1 Kharkiv
20	Elena Gracinda Santos	(South Africa)	2022	6 February 1997 (age 29)	(United States) NJ/NY Gotham FC
Player(s) transferred out during this season
15	Sibel Göker	(Turkey)	2021	14 January 1994 (age 32)	
30	Berthe Andiolo	(Cameroon)	2021	15 April 1992 (age 34)	(Turkey) Kireçburnu Spor
–	Nurşin Akurt	(Turkey)	2021	15 April 2004 (age 22)	(Turkey) Kireçburnu Spor
–	Duru Gezer	(Turkey)	2021	5 July 2005 (age 21)	(Turkey) Kireçburnu Spor
–	Melin Ateş	(Turkey)	2021	11 August 2005 (age 21)	(Turkey) Kireçburnu Spor

== Transfers and loans ==
=== In ===
Date	No.	Pos.	Player	From	Fee	Source
1 February 2022	13	MF	(Turkey) Birgül Sadıkoğlu	(Ukraine) WFC Zhytlobud-1 Kharkiv	Undisclosed	
3 March 2022	32	GK	(Turkey) Gamze Nur Yaman	(Ukraine) WFC Zhytlobud-2 Kharkiv	Undisclosed	
4 March 2022	16	MF	(Turkey) Zehra Yılmaz	(Turkey) Bursa Soğanlı Spor	Undisclosed	
8 March 2022	14	FW	(Bosnia and Herzegovina) Dajana Spasojević	(Ukraine) WFC Zhytlobud-1 Kharkiv	Undisclosed	
8 March 2022	20	FW	(South Africa) Elena Gracinda Santos	(United States) NJ/NY Gotham FC	Undisclosed	
21 March 2022	7	FW	(Turkey) Erva Karaovalı	(Turkey) Kocaeli Bayan FK	Undisclosed	
21 March 2022	2	DF	(Turkey) İrem Barut	(Turkey) Yukatel Kayserispor	Undisclosed	

=== Out ===
Date	No.	Pos.	Player	To	Fee	Source
22 February 2022	–	DF	(Turkey) Nurşin Akurt	(Turkey) Küçükçekmece Akdeniz Spor	Undisclosed	
22 February 2022	–	MF	(Turkey) Melin Ateş	(Turkey) Küçükçekmece Akdeniz Spor	Undisclosed	
22 February 2022	–	FW	(Turkey) Duru Gezer	(Turkey) Küçükçekmece Akdeniz Spor	Undisclosed	
4 March 2022	30	MF	(Cameroon) Berthe Andiolo	(Turkey) Kireçburnu Spor	Undisclosed	
4 April 2022	15	MF	(Turkey) Sibel Göker		Undisclosed	

== Management team ==
Position	Staff
Head Coach	(Turkey) Nurcan Çelik
Sporting Director	(Turkey) Vahit Mert
Coach	(Turkey) Oğuz Karakaya
Athletic Performance Coach	(Turkey) Alper Çıkıkçı
Goalkeeping Coach	(Turkey) Yunus Ulucan
Analyst	(Turkey) Birkan İpek
Physiotherapist	(Turkey) Gülin Köseoğlu
Outfitter	(Turkey) Umut Sarıaltun

Last updated: 14 March 2022
Source: Galatasaray SK

== Pre-season ==
Win Draw Loss Fixtures

31 October 2021 Friendly	Galatasaray	4–0	Sakarya Ozanlar Gücü Spor	Küçükçekmece, Istanbul
	Elanur Laçın; Gözde Gül	Report		Stadium: Yeşilova Kemal Aktaş Stadı

7 November 2021 Friendly	Galatasaray	2–1	Ankara Fomget	Istanbul
	Serpil Özer; Milica Denda	Report		Stadium: Florya Metin Oktay Facilities

14 November 2021 Friendly	Galatasaray	3–0	Bağcılar Evren Spor	Küçükçekmece, Istanbul
	Elanur Laçın 7', 19', 37'	Report		Stadium: Yeşilova Kemal Aktaş Stadı

3 December 2021 Friendly	Galatasaray	2–0	Altay	Antalya
	Samia Adam 69'; Serpil Özer 88'	Report		Stadium: Nirvana Cosmopolitan

7 December 2021 Friendly	Galatasaray Hepsiburada	0–7	Fenerbahçe	Sarıyer, Istanbul, Turkey
	Ijeoma Queenth Daniels (red card) 5'	Report	Fatma Kara 10' (pen.); Berdan Bozkurt 15'; Shameeka Fishley 30', 34', 38'; Kennya Cordner 41'; Setenay Sırım 51'	Stadium: Nef Stadium; Referee: Cansu Tiryaki; Assistant referees: Betül Nur Yılmaz, Sedef Aktan

== Competitions ==
=== Overall record ===
Competition	First match	Last match	Starting round	Final position	Record							
Competition	First match	Last match	Starting round	Final position	Pld	W	D	L	GF	GA	GD	Win %
Süper Lig	19 December 2021	8 May 2022	Matchday 1	6th	22	8	5	9	35	31	+4	36.36
Total					22	8	5	9	35	31	+4	36.36

Last updated: 12 May 2022
Source: FootyStats

=== Turkish Women's Football Super League ===
==== League table ( Group B ) ====
Pos	Team	Pld	W	D	L	GF	GA	GD	Pts	Qualification	ALG	FKA	HAK	KON	ADA	GAL	RIZ	TRA	SIV	DUD	KAY	ILK
1	ALG	22	19	2	1	93	3	+90	59	Quarterfinals	—	2–0	1–0	2–0	5–0	5–1	4–0	3–0	3–0	10–0	7–0	9–0
2	Fatih Karagümrük	22	16	4	2	52	14	+38	52	Quarterfinals	1–0	—	2–0	2–0	1–1	1–0	3–2	1–0	3–0	2–0	3–0	6–0
3	Hakkari	22	13	4	5	46	18	+28	43	Quarterfinals	0–0	1–1	—	1–4	1–0	1–0	1–0	2–4	4–0	6–0	4–0	5–1
4	Konak	22	12	7	3	36	16	+20	43	Quarterfinals	0–0	1–1	1–0	—	0–0	2–1	1–1	2–0	2–0	0–2	1–1	3–0
5	Adana	22	10	5	7	40	30	+10	35		0–4	0–3	0–0	1–1	—	2–0	4–3	2–1	0–1	2–0	10–0	3–2
6	Galatasaray	22	8	5	9	35	31	+4	29		0–3	2–1	1–1	1–1	1–1	—	1–3	2–1	3–0	4–1	4–0	0–1
7	Çaykur Rizespor	22	7	4	11	32	35	−3	25		0–3	1–2	1–2	1–2	3–1	2–2	—	1–2	1–0	2–0	3–0	3–0
8	Trabzonspor	22	7	3	12	28	33	−5	24		0–4	1–1	0–1	1–2	0–3	1–2	2–0	—	2–0	3–0	3–1	1–1
9	Sivasspor	22	6	1	15	18	50	−32	19	Play-out	1–6	1–3	1–4	0–2	0–5	2–1	1–1	2–0	—	4–2	0–1	2–1
10	Dudullu	22	5	3	14	20	59	−39	18	Play-out	0–7	0–2	1–4	0–3	0–1	1–2	2–2	1–1	2–1	—	4–1	1–0
11	Kayseri	22	4	3	15	11	67	−56	15	Play-out	0–4	1–8	0–4	0–6	1–2	0–0	1–0	1–0	0–1	0–1	—	2–1
12	İlkadım	22	3	3	16	20	75	−55	12	Play-out	0–11	1–5	0–4	1–2	3–2	0–6	1–2	1–5	4–1	1–1	1–1	—

Source: TFF.org / Update: 8 May 2022

==== Results summary ====
Overall								Home						Away					
Pld	W	D	L	GF	GA	GD	Pts	W	D	L	GF	GA	GD	W	D	L	GF	GA	GD
22	8	5	9	35	31	+4	29	5	3	3	19	13	+6	3	2	6	16	18	−2

Last updated: 12 May 2022.
Source: Competitive matches

==== Results by matchday ====
Round	1	2	3	4	5	6	7	8	9	10	11	12	13	14	15	16	17	18	19	20	21	22
Ground	H	A	A	H	A	H	A	H	A	H	A	A	H	H	A	H	A	H	A	H	A	H
Result	W	W	L	D	L	D	W	L	W	W	D	L	W	W	L	D	L	L	L	W	D	L
Position	2	2	5	6	6	6	6	6	5	5	6	6	6	6	6	6	6	6	6	6	6	6

Updated to match(es) played on 12 May 2022. Source: Competitive matches
A = Away; H = Home; W = Win; D = Draw; L = Loss

==== Matches ====
19 December 2021 1	Galatasaray Hepsiburada	3–0	Bitexen Sivasspor	Küçükçekmece, Istanbul
12:00 TRT	Elanur Laçın 27' (yellow card) 45'; Cemre Kara 32'; Samia Adam 42' (yellow card) 86'	Report	Megi Ejibia (yellow card) 45'; Figen Naçar (yellow card) 64'	Stadium: Yeşilova Kemal Aktaş Stadı; Referee: Ruken Dağ; Assistant referees: Semra Bulut, Büşra Temizer; Fourth official: Aslı Köse Güllüdere

25 December 2021 2	Dudullu Spor	2–3	Galatasaray Hepsiburada	Ümraniye, Istanbul
13:00 TRT	Ece Tütüncü 19', 75'; Kübra Altıntaş (yellow card) 53'	Report	Zeynep Ece Güneş 43'; Berthe Prudence Andiolo Ongnomo 47'; Didem Dülber 53'; Angie Sandrith Telles Ortiz (yellow card) 66'; Serpil Özer (yellow card) 69'; Elif Kesgin (yellow card) 90+3'	Stadium: Dudullu Stadı; Referee: Emine Öz; Assistant referees: Mesude Kip, Melis Gökduvan; Fourth official: Nimet Altunkıran

29 December 2021 3	Wulfz Fatih Karagümrük	1–0	Galatasaray Hepsiburada	Fatih, Istanbul
12:00 TRT	Sibel Duman 14'; Rita Akaffou (yellow card) 75'; Emmaculate Msipa (yellow card) 80'; Bassira Touré (yellow card) 90+2'	Report	Berthe Prudence Andiolo Ongnomo (yellow card) 22'; Didem Dülber (yellow card) 65'	Stadium: Vefa Stadium; Referee: Aslı Köse Güllüdere; Assistant referees: Betül Nur Yılmaz, Batuhan Sarıgül; Fourth official: Ertuğrul Kösterelioğlu

8 January 2022 4	Galatasaray Hepsiburada	1–1	Hakkarigücü Spor	Küçükçekmece, Istanbul
12:00 TRT	Fadime Kurnaz (yellow card) 26'; Samia Adam 75'	Report	Shokhista Khojasheva 19'; Aycan Arda (yellow card) 71'; Öznur Baysal (yellow card) 81'	Stadium: Yeşilova Kemal Aktaş Stadı; Referee: Muhammed Ömür; Assistant referees: Figen Eleman, Melike Dörttaş; Fourth official: Alp Tanırgan

12 January 2022 5	Bitexen Adana İdmanyurduspor	2–0	Galatasaray Hepsiburada	Adana
12:00 TRT	Marlène Kasaj 26' (yellow card) 46'; Müzeyyen Dilek Özbiler 38'; İrem Bir (yellow card) 73'	Report	Angie Sandrith Telles Ortiz (yellow card) 17'; İsmigül Yalçıner (yellow card) 71'; Elanur Laçın (yellow card) 77'; Elif Kesgin (yellow card) 90+5'	Stadium: Muharrem Gülergin Suni Çim; Referee: Kemal Savaş; Assistant referees: Necmi Akıncı, Mevlüt Bozok; Fourth official: Şahin Aygün Yıldırım

16 January 2022 6	Galatasaray Hepsiburada	1–1	Konak Belediyespor	Küçükçekmece, Istanbul
12:00 TRT	Milica Denda 19' (pen.); Berthe Prudence Andiolo Ongnomo (yellow card) 47'	Report	Milica Denda 45+2' (o.g.)	Stadium: Yeşilova Kemal Aktaş Stadı; Referee: Atakan Kozik; Assistant referees: Eshan Kartal, Tolgahan Küçük; Fourth official: Ali Serdar Kankaş

22 January 2022 7	İlkadım Belediyesi	0–6	Galatasaray Hepsiburada	Samsun
12:00 TRT	Esra Karaoğlu (yellow card) 13'	Report	İsmigül Yalçıner (yellow card) 25'; Samia Adam 55'; Berthe Prudence Andiolo Ongnomo 61'; Elanur Laçın 38', 43', 68', 89'	Stadium: Millet Bahçesi 19 Mayıs Suni Çim Saha; Referee: Serkan Perçin; Assistant referees: Zelife Sağer, İrem Parsak; Fourth official: Vural Kurt

30 March 2022 8	Galatasaray Hepsiburada	0–3	ALG Spor	Küçükçekmece, Istanbul
12:00 TRT	Fadime Kurnaz (yellow card) 73'	Report	Mariem Houij 43'; Monique Rith 45'; Ecem Cumert (yellow card) 54'; Medine Erkan 85'	Stadium: Yeşilova Kemal Aktaş Stadı; Referee: Muhammed Ömür; Assistant referees: Özgü Akın, Elif Karaarslan; Fourth official: Hüseyin Ahmet Ocaklı

2 February 2022 9	Trabzonspor	1–2	Galatasaray Hepsiburada	Trabzon
12:00 TRT	Marie Laure Kong (yellow card) 2'; Rose Bella 20'	Report	Elanur Laçın 8'; Serpil Özer (yellow card) 70'; Didem Dülber 72'	Stadium: Ahmet Suat Özyazıcı Stadı; Referee: Enes Yakup Baş; Assistant referees: Ahmet Tolga Tomar, Mustafa Bozali; Fourth official: Ömer Nazıf Baytar

6 February 2022 10	Galatasaray Hepsiburada	4–0	Yukatel Kayserispor	Küçükçekmece, Istanbul
12:00 TRT	Sibel Göker 37', 90'; Birgül Sadıkoğlu 51'; Milica Denda 67'; Samia Adam (yellow card) 88'	Report	Saniye Arslano (yellow card) 38'	Stadium: Yeşilova Kemal Aktaş Stadı; Referee: Neslihan Koç; Assistant referees: Yağmur Vural, Ayşenur Akçay; Fourth official: Aytaç Sönmezer

12 February 2022 11	Çaykur Rizespor	2–2	Galatasaray Hepsiburada	Rize
12:00 TRT	Zehra Acar 14'; Teona Bakradze 65'	Report	Ijeoma Queenth Daniels (yellow card) 9'; Sibel Göker 42'; Milica Denda 45+3' (pen.)	Stadium: Şenol Birol Futbol Kompleksi Sahası; Referee: Gül Demir; Assistant referees: Tunahan Demirel, Ünal Başar; Fourth official: Ömer Kösoğlu

27 February 2022 12	Bitexen Sivasspor	2–1	Galatasaray Hepsiburada	Sivas
11:00 TRT	Maria Caroline Manoel Shimoguiri 12'; Figen Naçar 80' (yellow card) 90+4'	Report	Birgül Sadıkoğlu 6'; Berthe Prudence Andiolo Ongnomo (yellow card) 76'	Stadium: 4 Eylül Spor Vadisi 2 Nolu Suni Çim Saha; Referee: Burak Yıldız; Assistant referees: Metin Taş, Emre Bayraktar; Fourth official: Batuhan Bolat

5 March 2022 13	Galatasaray Hepsiburada	4–1	Dudullu Spor	Istanbul
14:00 TRT	Birgül Sadıkoğlu (yellow card) 26'; Angie Sandrith Telles Ortiz (yellow card) 53'; Samia Adam 71'; Zeynep Ece Güneş 72', 78'; Birgül Sadıkoğlu 90+4'	Report	Tuana Naz Türçin (yellow card) 23'; Baktygul Toktobolotova 26' (pen.); Zeynep Okumuş (red card) 84'	Stadium: Florya Metin Oktay Facilities; Referee: Ruken Dağ; Assistant referees: Özgü Akın, Tuana Çalışkan; Fourth official: Süleyman Özdemir

9 March 2022 14	Galatasaray Hepsiburada	2–1	Wulfz Fatih Karagümrük	Küçükçekmece, Istanbul
12:00 TRT	Serpil Özer (yellow card) 29'; Elena Gracinda Santos 55'; İsmigül Yalçıner 75' (yellow card) 85'	Report	Saratou Traoré 62'; Ferda İpek Çevik (yellow card) 85'; Marija Ilić (yellow card) 90'	Stadium: Yeşilova Kemal Aktaş Stadı; Referee: Aslı Köse Güllüdere; Assistant referees: Nurgül Türeyen, Nisa Ertal; Fourth official: Elif Karaarslan

23 March 2022 15	Hakkarigücü Spor	1–0	Galatasaray Hepsiburada	Hakkari
12:00 TRT	Diyan Ceyhan (yellow card) 43'; Yaren Çetin 51' (o.g.); Mwanalima Adam (yellow card) 70'	Report	Yaren Çetin (yellow card) 37'; Fadime Kurnaz (yellow card) 71'	Stadium: Merzan Şehir Stadı; Referee: Selçuk Keklik; Assistant referees: Berkay Diniz, Mazlum Bilici; Fourth official: Rümeysa Gök

27 March 2022 16	Galatasaray Hepsiburada	1–1	Bitexen Adana İdmanyurduspor	Küçükçekmece, Istanbul
12:00 TRT	Birgül Sadıkoğlu 24'; Yaren Çetin (yellow card) 63'	Report	Müzeyyen Dilek Özbiler 90+5'	Stadium: Yeşilova Kemal Aktaş Stadı; Referee: Ertuğrul Yolcu; Assistant referees: Burak Gökhan, Doğukan Baş; Fourth official: Ahmet Yiğit İlbasmış

2 April 2022 17	Konak Belediyespor	2–1	Galatasaray Hepsiburada	İzmir
12:00 TRT	Mai Sweilem 1'; Rabiya İsgi 47'; Nazlıcan Parlak (yellow card) 75'	Report	Birgül Sadıkoğlu 17'; Dajana Spasojević (yellow card) 45+3'; Serpil Özer (yellow card) 71'	Stadium: Atatürk Stadı 1 Nolu Yan Saha; Referee: Gökhan Özdemir; Assistant referees: Fatma Özlem Tursun, Halime Uzungündeş; Fourth official: Umut Tokmak

17 April 2022 18	Galatasaray Hepsiburada	0–1	İlkadım Belediyesi	Istanbul
13:00 TRT	Cemre Kara (yellow card) End of the match'	Report	Esra Karaoğlu (yellow card) 8'; Kamara Salamatu (yellow card) 39'; Ece İrem Tilbe 59'; Saio M. Quraishi (yellow card) 69'	Stadium: Florya Metin Oktay Facilities; Referee: Eda Cihan; Assistant referees: Şebnem Urdal, Yağmur Vural; Fourth official: Aybüke Bozacı

23 April 2022 19	ALG Spor	5–1	Galatasaray Hepsiburada	Gaziantep
14:00 TRT	Monique Rith 26'; Mariem Houij 31'; İlayda Civelek 37'; Thays Ferrer 69'; Grâce Mfwamba 89'	Report	Milica Denda 66'	Stadium: Batur Stadı; Referee: Burak Aksak; Assistant referees: Onur Özkan, Mehmet Erdoğan; Fourth official: Rıdvan Bayır

30 April 2022 20	Galatasaray Hepsiburada	2–1	Trabzonspor	Küçükçekmece, Istanbul
12:00 TRT	Elena Gracinda Santos 8', 28'; Gülhanım Doğan (yellow card) 72'	Report	Doly Diane Wabeua Djiatio 35' (yellow card) 75'; Fatima Sağra Öztürk (yellow card) 81'; Arife Şentürk (yellow card) 90+3'	Stadium: Yeşilova Kemal Aktaş Stadı; Referee: Oğuzhan Gökçen; Assistant referees: Ali Kış, Emrah Altındağ; Fourth official: Gülhan Terlikli

5 May 2022 21	Yukatel Kayserispor	0–0	Galatasaray Hepsiburada	Kayseri
12:00 TRT	Saniye Arslano (yellow card) 78'	Report	Samia Adam (red card) 78'; Yaren Çetin (yellow card) 90'	Stadium: Vali Nihat Canpolat Sümer 2 Nolu Saha; Referee: Cem Eray Eşmekaya; Assistant referees: Turan Çelik, Erkan Kırçıl; Fourth official: Mehmet Altıparmak

8 May 2022 22	Galatasaray Hepsiburada	1–3	Çaykur Rizespor	Küçükçekmece, Istanbul
12:00 TRT	Yaren Çetin (yellow card) 55'; Milica Denda 71'; Fadime Kurnaz (yellow card) 79'	Report	Teona Bakradze (yellow card) 42' (goal) 45+1', 53'; Ayshan Ahmadova (yellow card) 70'; Remziye Bakır 84' (pen.); Demet Kılınç (yellow card) 90+5'	Stadium: Yeşilova Kemal Aktaş Stadı; Referee: Ufuk Demircioğlu; Assistant referees: Mesude Kip, Şivan Kesici; Fourth official: Gülhan Terlikli

== Statistics ==
=== Appearances and goals ===
No.	Pos.	Player	Süper Lig		Total	
No.	Pos.	Player	Apps	Goals	Apps	Goals
1	GK	(Turkey) Evin Dinçer	0	0	0	0
2	DF	(Turkey) İrem Barut	2	0	2	0
3	DF	(Turkey) İlayda Uğur	3	0	3	0
4	DF	(Turkey) Yaren Çetin	15	0	15	0
5	DF	(Turkey) Zeynep Nisa Üner	2	0	2	0
6	DF	(Turkey) Cemre Kara	15	1	15	1
7	FW	(Turkey) Erva Karaovalı	6	0	6	0
8	MF	(Turkey) Zeynep Ece Güneş	10	3	10	3
9	FW	(Turkey) Elanur Laçın	9	6	9	6
10	MF	(Turkey) İsmigül Yalçıner	19	1	19	1
11	MF	(Turkey) Elif Kesgin	9	0	9	0
13	MF	(Turkey) Birgül Sadıkoğlu	9	5	9	5
14	FW	(Bosnia and Herzegovina) Dajana Spasojević	9	0	9	0
16	MF	(Turkey) Zehra Yılmaz	9	0	9	0
17	MF	(Turkey) Buse Çolak	10	0	10	0
19	MF	(Turkey) Gözde Gül	4	0	4	0
20	FW	(South Africa) Elena Gracinda Santos	8	3	8	3
21	MF	(Turkey) Didem Dülber	20	2	20	2
22	DF	(Nigeria) Ijeoma Queenth Daniels	22	0	22	0
23	DF	(Turkey) Fadime Kurnaz	5	0	5	0
24	MF	(Turkey) Arzu Akkurt	3	0	3	0
25	GK	(Turkey) Büşra Kenet	12	0	12	0
32	GK	(Turkey) Gamze Nur Yaman	5	0	5	0
33	MF	(Turkey) Serpil Özer	19	0	19	0
44	DF	(Serbia) Milica Denda	18	5	18	5
61	DF	(Turkey) İlayda Gündoğdu	0	0	0	0
66	GK	(Turkey) Sude Nur Sözüdoğru	6	0	6	0
67	MF	(Turkey) Gülhanım Doğan	7	0	7	0
77	MF	(Brazil) Amanda Ferreira de Alencar	2	0	2	0
78	MF	(Colombia) Angie Sandrith Telles Ortiz	12	0	12	0
99	MF	(Egypt) Samia Adam	17	4	17	4
Player(s) transferred out but featured this season
15	MF	(Turkey) Sibel Göker	5	3	5	3
30	MF	(Cameroon) Berthe Andiolo	11	2	11	2
–	DF	(Turkey) Nurşin Akurt	0	0	0	0
–	MF	(Turkey) Melin Ateş	0	0	0	0
–	FW	(Turkey) Duru Gezer	0	0	0	0

Last updated: 12 May 2022.
Source: TFF.org

=== Goalscorers ===
Rank	No.	Pos.	Player	Süper Lig	Total
1	9	FW	(Turkey) Elanur Laçın	6	6
2	13	MF	(Turkey) Birgül Sadıkoğlu	5	5
2	44	DF	(Serbia) Milica Denda	5	5
3	99	MF	(Egypt) Samia Adam	4	4
4	8	MF	(Turkey) Zeynep Ece Güneş	3	3
4	15	MF	(Turkey) Sibel Göker	3	3
4	20	FW	(South Africa) Elena Gracinda Santos	3	3
5	21	MF	(Turkey) Didem Dülber	2	2
5	30	MF	(Cameroon) Berthe Andiolo	2	2
6	6	DF	(Turkey) Cemre Kara	1	1
6	10	MF	(Turkey) İsmigül Yalçıner	1	1
Own goals				0	0
Totals				35	35

Last updated: 12 May 2022.
Source: TFF.org

=== Clean sheets ===
Rank	No.	Pos.	Player	Süper Lig	Total
1	25	GK	(Turkey) Büşra Kenet	3	3
2	66	GK	(Turkey) Sude Nur Sözüdoğru	1	1
3	1	GK	(Turkey) Evin Dinçer	0	0
4	32	GK	(Turkey) Gamze Nur Yaman	0	0
Totals				4	4

Last updated: 12 May 2022.
Source: TFF.org

=== Disciplinary records ===
No.	Pos.	Player	Süper Lig			Total		
No.	Pos.	Player	Booked	(yellow card) (yellow-red card)	Sent off (straight red)	Booked	(yellow card) (yellow-red card)	Sent off (straight red)
4	DF	(Turkey) Yaren Çetin	4	0	0	4	0	0
6	DF	(Turkey) Cemre Kara	1	0	0	1	0	0
9	FW	(Turkey) Elanur Laçın	2	0	0	2	0	0
10	MF	(Turkey) İsmigül Yalçıner	3	0	0	3	0	0
11	MF	(Turkey) Elif Kesgin	2	0	0	2	0	0
13	MF	(Turkey) Birgül Sadıkoğlu	1	0	0	1	0	0
14	FW	(Bosnia and Herzegovina) Dajana Spasojević	1	0	0	1	0	0
21	MF	(Turkey) Didem Dülber	1	0	0	1	0	0
22	DF	(Nigeria) Ijeoma Queenth Daniels	1	0	0	1	0	0
23	DF	(Turkey) Fadime Kurnaz	4	0	0	4	0	0
30	MF	(Cameroon) Berthe Andiolo	3	0	0	3	0	0
33	MF	(Turkey) Serpil Özer	4	0	0	4	0	0
67	MF	(Turkey) Gülhanım Doğan	1	0	0	1	0	0
78	MF	(Colombia) Angie Sandrith Telles Ortiz	3	0	0	3	0	0
99	MF	(Egypt) Samia Adam	2	0	1	2	0	1
Totals			32	0	1	32	0	1

Last updated: 12 May 2022.
Source: TFF.org
