= List of Galatasaray S.K. (women's football) players =

This is a list of former and current Galatasaray players.

Note: Career dates include first team years only.

Appearances and goals also include league and European matches and goals.

Current players are in bold typeface.

As of 17 November 2026

== Key to positions ==
GK	Goalkeeper	RB	Right back	RW	Right winger	DF	Defender
IF	Inside forward	LB	Left back	LW	Left winger	CB	Centre back
FW	Forward	FB	Full back	W	Winger	MF	Midfielder
ST	Striker	WH	Wing half	AM	Attacking midfielder	CM	Central midfielder

== Players ==
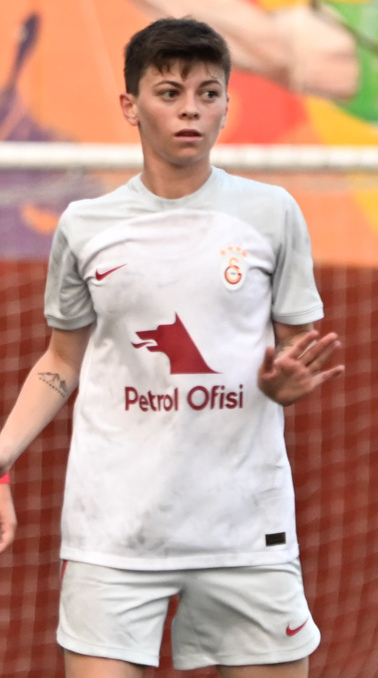
Kristina Bakarandze made 74 appearances for the Galatasaray

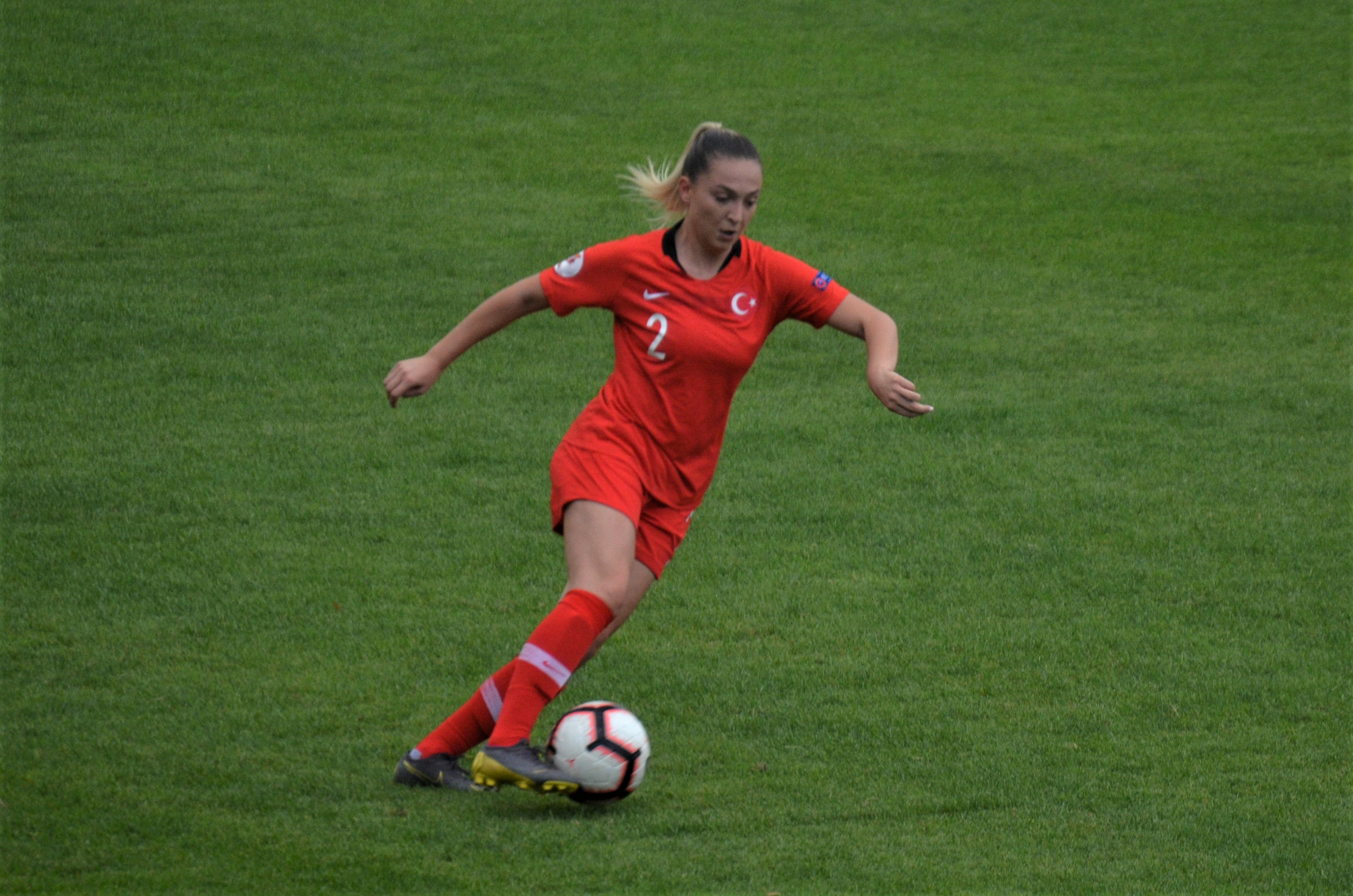
Berna Yeniçeri made 69 appearances for the Galatasaray

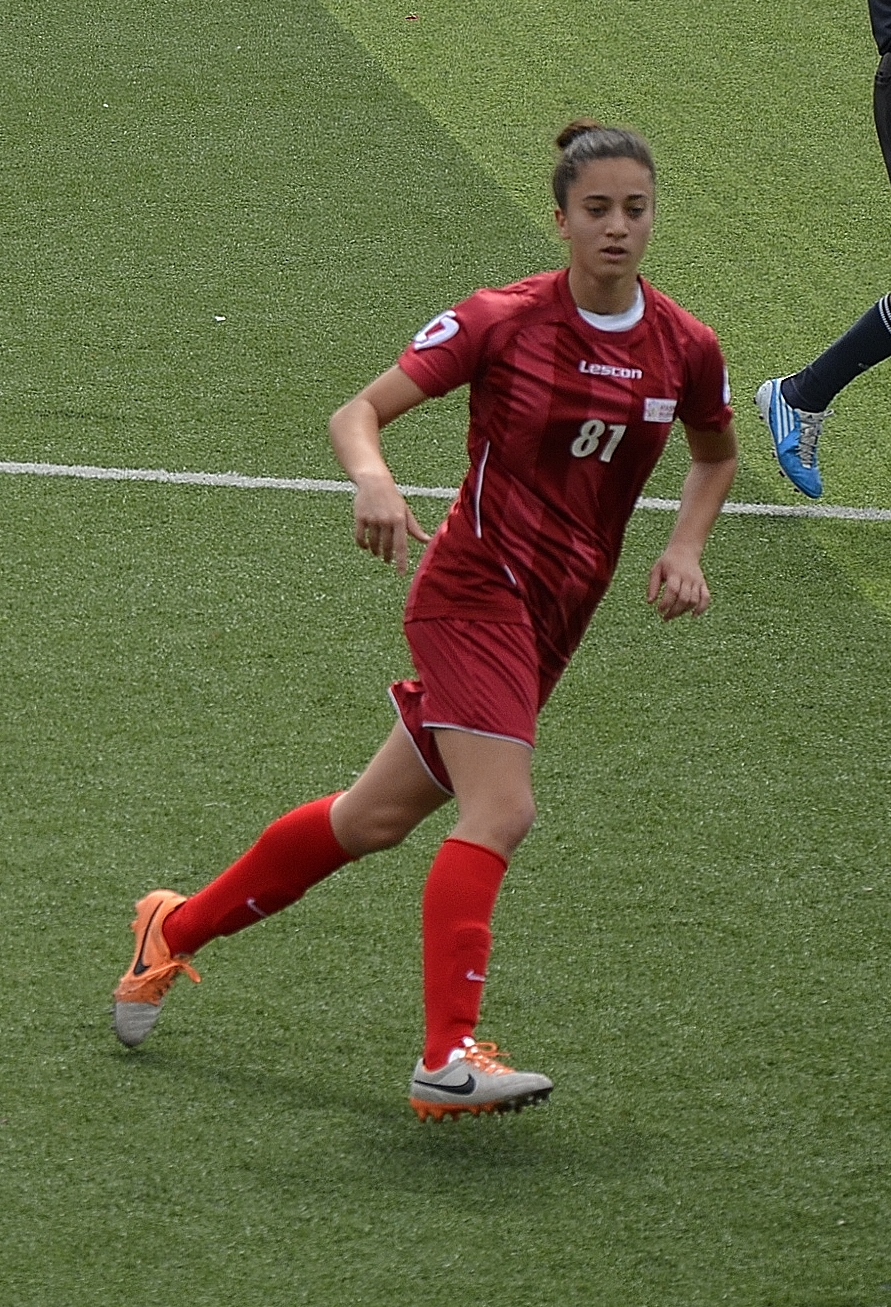
Emine Ecem Esen made 64 appearances for the Galatasaray

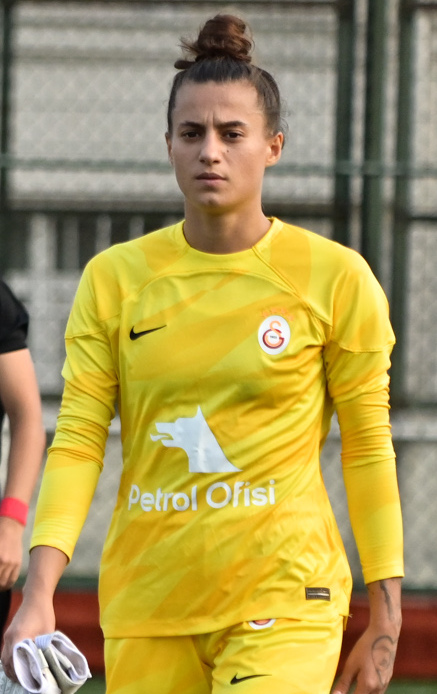
Gamze Nur Yaman made 57 appearances for the Galatasaray

Name	Nationality	Position	Galatasaray career	Appearances		Goals		Ref.	Notes
Name	Nationality	Position	Galatasaray career	Total	League	Total	League	Ref.	Notes
**Ebru Topçu**	Turkey	Midfielder	2022–	114	106	55	54		
**Eda Karataş**	Turkey	Defender	2023–	93	83	6	6		
Kristina Bakarandze	Azerbaijan	Midfielder	2022–2025	74	64	7	7		
Berna Yeniçeri	Turkey	Defender	2022–2025	69	63	6	6		
Emine Ecem Esen	Turkey	Midfielder	2022–2025	64	56	5	5		
Gamze Nur Yaman	Turkey	Goalkeeper	2022–2025	57	47	0	0		
Benan Altıntaş	Turkey	Forward	2023–2026	54	50	3	3		
Fatma Sare Öztürk	Turkey	Defender	2022–2025	53	50	0	0		
**Arzu Akkurt**	Turkey	Midfielder	2021–	52	44	4	4		
Elanur Laçın	Turkey	Forward	2021–2026	51	51	18	18		
**Ecem Cumert**	Turkey	Midfielder	2024–	48	41	1	1		
Oluwatosin Demehin	Nigeria	Defender	2024–2026	47	40	2	2		
Arzu Karabulut	Turkey	Midfielder	2024–2025	47	37	16	14		
İsmigül Yalçıner	Turkey	Midfielder	2022–2025	43	41	4	4		
Marie Ngah	Cameroon	Forward	2024–2026	41	41	41	41		
Milica Denda	Serbia	Defender	2021–2023	38	38	9	9		
Zehra Yılmaz	Turkey	Midfielder	2022–2024	34	34	2	2		
Didem Dülber	Turkey	Midfielder	2021–2024	33	33	2	2		
Hapsatou Malado Diallo	Senegal	Forward	2024–2025	33	23	12	9		
Catalina Usme	Colombia	Forward	2024–2025	33	23	10	8		
**Marta Cintra**	Brazil	Forward	2025–	33	33	14	14		
**Jang Chang**	South Korea	Midfielder	2025–	30	30	3	3		
Elena Gracinda Santos	South Africa	Forward	2022–2023	29	29	11	11		
**Elif Keskin**	Turkey	Midfielder	2025–	28	28	0	0		
Andrea Stašková	Czech Republic	Forward	2024–2025	28	18	10	5		
Nazlıcan Parlak	Turkey	Midfielder	2022–2025	28	22	4	3		
**Melike Öztürk**	Turkey	Forward	2025–	28	28	9	9		
Lyubov Shmatko	Ukraine	Defender	2023–2024	27	27	2	2		
Handan Kurğa	Turkey	Goalkeeper	2022–2025	27	27	0	0		
Ruth Kipoyi	DR Congo	Forward	2023–2024	26	26	9	9		
**Melike Pekel**	Turkey	Forward	2025–	25	25	10	10		
Serpil Özer	Turkey	Midfielder	2021–2023	24	24	0	0		
Kezban Tağ	Turkey	Defender	2025–2026	23	23	0	0		
**İrem Eren**	Turkey	Midfielder	2024–	23	19	3	3		
Julia Hickelsberger	Austria	Midfielder	2025–2026	22	22	5	5		
Ijeoma Queenth Daniels	Nigeria	Defender	2021–2022	22	22	0	0		
Derya Arhan	Turkey	Defender	2022–2023	22	22	1	1		
Naomie Kabakaba	DR Congo	Defender	2023–2024	22	22	14	14		
**Dana Foederer**	Netherlands	Midfielder	2026–	21	21	1	1		
Yağmur Uraz	Turkey	Forward	2022–2023	21	21	26	26		
Rabia Nur Küçük	Turkey	Defender	2023–2024	21	21	0	0		
İlayda Civelek	Turkey	Midfielder	2022–2023	20	20	2	2		
Birgül Sadıkoğlu	Turkey	Midfielder	2022–2023	20	20	13	13		
Flourish Sabastine	Nigeria	Forward	2024–2025	18	18	1	1		
Samia Adam	Egypt	Midfielder	2021–2022	17	17	4	4		
Büşra Kenet	Turkey	Goalkeeper	2021–2023	17	17	0	0		
Angel Mukasa	Sweden	Goalkeeper	2025–2026	16	16	0	0		
Cemre Kara	Turkey	Defender	2021–2022	15	15	1	1		
Yaren Çetin	Turkey	Defender	2021–2022	15	15	0	0		
Zeynep Ece Güneş	Turkey	Midfielder	2021–2023	15	15	3	3		
Li Jiayue	China	Defender	2023	13	13	0	0		
Valentina Giacinti	Italy	Forward	2025–2026	13	13	14	14		
Megi Doçi	Albania	Forward	2024	13	13	3	3		
**Vitória Almeida**	Brazil	Forward	2026–	13	13	4	4		
Angie Sandrith Telles Ortiz	Colombia	Midfielder	2021–2022	12	12	0	0		
Mariem Houij	Tunisia	Forward	2023–2024	12	12	2	2		
Laura Domínguez	Spain	Forward	2025	12	12	0	0		
**Aude Gbedjissi**	Benin	Forward	2026–	11	11	3	3		
**Cristina Martín-Prieto**	Spain	Forward	2026–	11	11	17	17		
Berthe Andiolo	Cameroon	Midfielder	2021–2022	11	11	2	2		
**Patrícia Morais**	Portugal	Goalkeeper	2026–	10	10	0	0		
Lalia Storti	France	Midfielder	2025–2026	10	10	0	0		
Buse Çolak	Turkey	Midfielder	2021–2022	10	10	0	0		
**Carole Costa**	Portugal	Defender	2026–	10	10	1	1		
**Jéssica Silva**	Portugal	Forward	2026–	9	9	2	2		
Dajana Spasojević	Bosnia and Herzegovina	Forward	2022	9	9	0	0		
Elif Kesgin	Turkey	Midfielder	2021–2022	9	9	0	0		
**Eleni Markou**	Greece	Defender	2026–	9	9	2	2		
Gülhanım Doğan	Turkey	Midfielder	2021–2022	8	8	0	0		
**Berra Pekgöz**	Turkey	Midfielder	2023–	8	8	2	2		
**Roberta Aprile**	Italy	Goalkeeper	2025–	8	8	0	0		
**Oliwia Domin**	Poland	Midfielder	2026–	8	8	0	0		
Emine Demir	Turkey	Defender	2022	7	7	1	1		
Sude Nur Sözüdoğru	Turkey	Goalkeeper	2021–2023	6	6	0	0		
Erva Karaovalı	Turkey	Forward	2022–2023	6	6	0	0		
Jazmin Wardlow	United States	Defender	2024–2025	6	6	0	0		
Yang Lina	China	Midfielder	2026	5	5	0	0		
Sibel Göker	Turkey	Midfielder	2021–2022	5	5	3	3		
Fadime Kurnaz	Turkey	Defender	2021–2022	5	5	0	0		
Chinaza Uchendu	Nigeria	Midfielder	2024	5	5	0	0		
Ina Kristoffersen	Norway	Defender	2024–2025	5	5	1	1		
Gözde Gül	Turkey	Midfielder	2021–2022	4	4	0	0		
İlayda Uğur	Turkey	Defender	2021–2023	4	4	0	0		
İrem Barut	Turkey	Defender	2022–2023	4	4	1	1		
Siomala Mapepa	Zambia	Forward	2023–2024	4	4	0	0		
**Sıla Besra Tetik**	Turkey	Defender	2026–	3	3	0	0		
**Narin Yakut**	Turkey	Defender	2025–	2	2	0	0		
Amanda Ferreira de Alencar	Brazil	Midfielder	2021–2022	2	2	0	0		
Zeynep Nisa Üner	Turkey	Defender	2021–2022	2	2	0	0		
Müge İnan Kandur	Turkey	Goalkeeper	2022–2025	2	1	0	0		
Helin Erbulun	Turkey	Midfielder	2022–2024	1	1	0	0		
**Lahna Diawara**	France	Defender	2026–	1	1	0	0		
**Esra Yarım**	Turkey	Goalkeeper	2024–	1	1	0	0		
**Meryem Başkaya**	Turkey	Defender	2026–	1	1	0	0		

== Notes ==
Statistics for the Yüksekova–Galatasaray match, played on April 22, 2026, during the 2025–26 season, have not been entered by the Turkish Football Federation (TFF) and therefore cannot be included in this list.
