= Ijeoma Queenth Daniels =

Nigerian women's football Defender

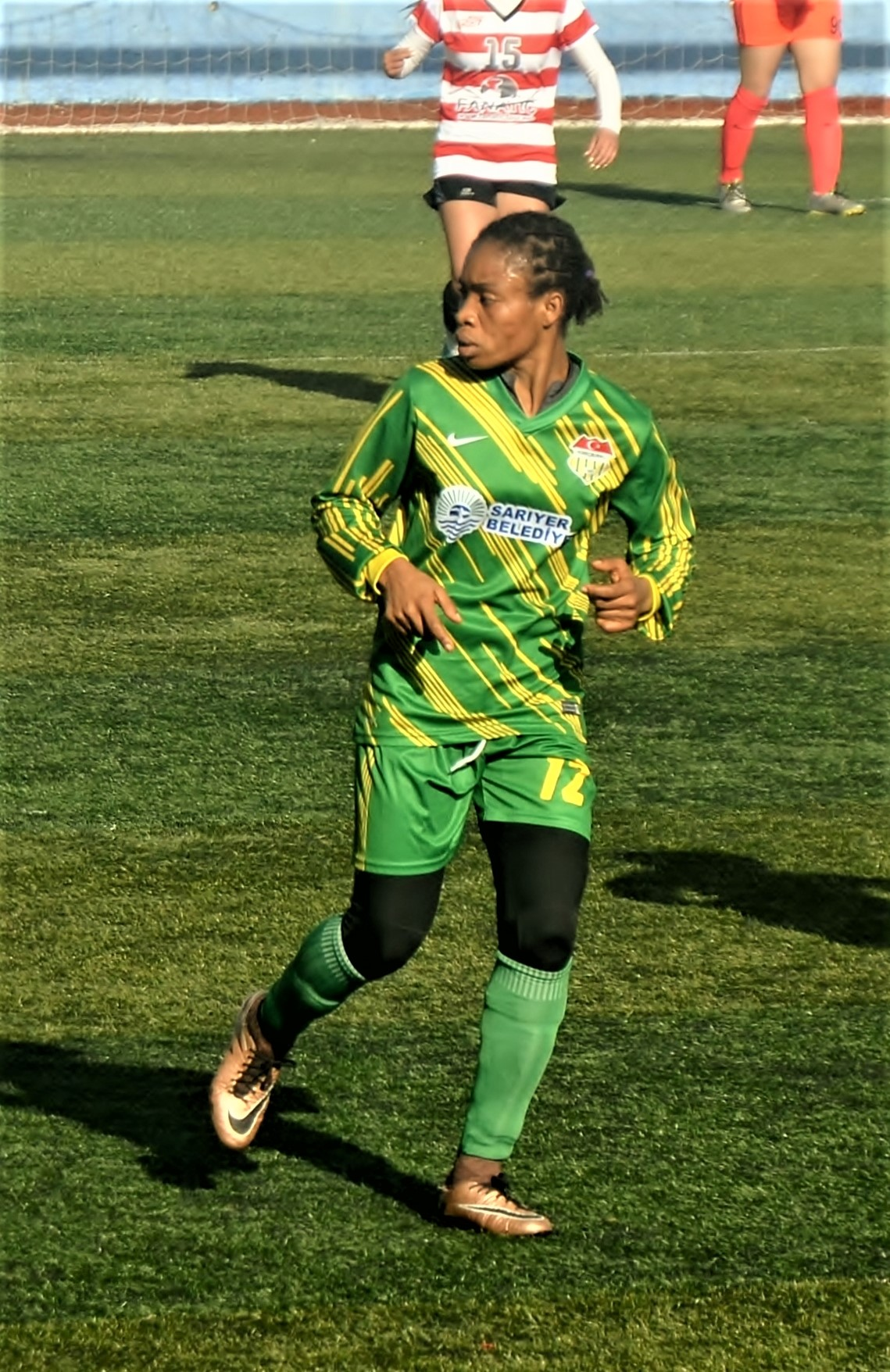
- Ijeoma Queenth Daniels from Nigeria playing for Kireçburnu Spor (December 2017)

Personal information
- Date of birth: 25 September 1992 (age 34)
- Place of birth: Nigeria
- Position: Defender

Team information
- Current team: Trabzonspor

Senior career*
Years	Team	Apps	(Gls)
2015–2016	Ataşehir Belediyespor	8	(1)
2016–2017	Kireçburnu Spor	8	(0)
2018	İlkadım Belediyesi	2	(0)
2020–2021	Adana İdmanyurduspor	8	(0)
2021–2022	Galatasaray	22	(0)
2022–2023	Trabzonspor	9	(0)
2024	Samsun Yabancılar Pazarı	7	(6)
2024	Adana İdmanyurduspor	7	(0)
2024–	Çekmeköy BilgiDoğa Spor	2	(0)

International career^{‡}
	Nigeria	0	(0)
- * Club domestic league appearances and goals as of 14 September 2024 ‡ National team caps and goals as of 18:03, 17 June 2015 (UTC)

Ijeoma Queenth Daniels (born 25 September 1992) is a Nigerian women's football defender, who plays for the Istanbul-based club Çekmeköy BilgiDoğa Spor in the Turkish Women's Football Super League.

== Club career ==
Daniels moved to Turkey in November 2015, and joined the Istanbul-based club Ataşehir Belediyespor to appear in the 2015–16 Women's First League season. She capped in eight games and scored one goal. The next season, she signed with Kireçburnu Spor, where she played eight matches only in 1 1/2 seasons. In the second half of the 2017–18 season, she transferred to İlkadım Belediyesi in Samsun, where she appeared in two matches. In the second half of the 2019-20 Turkish Women's First League season, she joined Adana İdmanyurduspor. For the |2022–22 Turkish Women's Super League season, she joined Galatasaray S.K. In the 2022–23 Turkish Women's Super League season, she transferred to Trabzonspor. She ended the season with nine matches played. The next season, she moved to Samsun Yabancılar Pazarı to her former club, which were relegated to the Women's First League. She played seven matches and scored six goals. In the second half of the season, she returned to the Women's Super League for her former club Adana İdmanyurduspor. In the 2024-25 Super League season, she joined the newly established Çekmeköy BilgiDoğa Spor in Istanbul.

== Injury ==
On 4 December 2016, she was injured during a match, and after attempting to walk off the pitch, she was unable to. Aysun Aliyeva, a player of the opponent team 1207 Antalya Spor, although lighter than Daniels, took her on humpback and carried the injured woman in pain to the bench.

== Career statistics ==
As of 14 September 2024.

Club	Season	League			Continental		National		Total	
Club	Season	Division	Apps	Goals	Apps	Goals	Apps	Goals	Apps	Goals
Ataşehir Belediyespor	2015–16	First League	8	1	–	–			8	1
Kireçburnu Spor	2016–17	First League	3	0	–	–			3	0
Kireçburnu Spor	2017–18	First League	5	0	–	–			5	0
Kireçburnu Spor	Total		8	0	–	–			8	0
İlkadım Belediyesi	2017–18	First League	2	0	–	–			2	0
Adana İdmanyurduspor	2019–20	First League	4	0	–	–			4	0
Adana İdmanyurduspor	2020–21	First League	4	0	–	–			4	0
Adana İdmanyurduspor	Total		8	0	–	–			8	0
Galatasaray S.K.	2021–22	Super League	22	0	-	-	0	0	22	
Trabzonspor	2022–23	Super League	9	0	-	-	0	0	9	0
Samsun Yabancılar Pazarı	2023–24	First League	7	6	-	-	0	0	7	6
Adana İdmanyurduspor	2023–24	Super League	7	0	–	–			7	0
Çekmeköy BilgiDoğa Spor	2024–25	Super League	2	0	–	–			2	0
Career Total			73	7	-	-	0	0	73	7

== Personal life ==
Ijeoma Queenth Daniels was born in Nigeria on 25 September 1992.
