= Altay S.K. (women's football) =

- Full name: Altay Spor Kulüvü Kadın Futbol Takımı
- Founded: 2020; 6 years ago
- Ground: Gaziemir District Stadium
- Chairman: Özgür Ekmekçioğlu
- Manager: (Turkey) Cenk Decdel
- League: Turkish Women's Super League
Away colours

Altay S.K. women's football, (Turkish: Altay Spor Kulübü Kadın Futbol Takımı), is a Turkish women's football team as part of Altay S.K. based in İzmir. Founded in 2020, the black-white colored team play currently in the Turkish Women's Football Super League, the top tier of the women's football in Turkey.

== History ==
The 1914-established İzmir-based Altay S.K. of the Süper Lig founded the women's football team in 2020 with the intention to join the Women's Third League. For preparations for the upcoming league season, the team trained at Kültürpark, an urbank park in the city center, since the club's facility with two fields of grass ground were not available to the women's team. The newly formed team ended their trainings because it became evident that they will not compete in the league as the Turkish Football Federation (TFF) suspended the Women's Third League in the 2020–21 season dure to ongoing COVID-19 pandemic in Turkey.

In September 2021, Altay S.K. applied to the TFF to be admitted to the Women's Super League, which was newly restructured from the Women's First League by the TFF to incorporate women's teams of major clubs of the men's Süper Lig. Upon approval, the team joined the Women's Super League.

For preparation to the 2020-21 Turkcell Super League season, the team played their first match, a friendly game, against the also new-formed team Galatasaray S.K.

The black-white colored team's chairman is Özgür Ekmekçioğlu. The is coached by Cenk Decdel, and the captain is Suzan Durmaz.

== Stadium ==
The team play their home matches at Gaziemir District Stadıum.

== Statistics ==
As of 9 March 2022

Season	League	Rank	Pld	W	D	L	GF	GA	GD	Pts
2021–22	Super League Gr. A	9 (^{1})	13	3	1	9	16	30	-14	10
Green marks a season followed by promotion, red a season followed by relegation.

- (^{1}) : Season in progress

== Current squad ==
As of 9 March 2021

- Head coach: (Turkey) Cenk Decdel

Note: Flags indicate national team as defined under FIFA eligibility rules; some limited exceptions apply. Players may hold more than one non-FIFA nationality.

No.	Pos.	Nation	Player
1	GK	GEO	Svetlana Gabelaia
12	GK	TUR	Aleyna Tayboğa
3	DF	TUR	Nihal Saraç
2	DF	TUR	Gamze Nur Sönmez
4	DF	TUR	Büşranur Alp
13	DF	TUR	Beyza Nur Altınışık
14	DF	TUR	Nilay Güreler
35	DF	TUR	Suzan Durmaz (C)
77	DF	JAM	Sacha-Gay Brown
6	MF	TUR	Nisa Öztürk
11	MF	TUR	Tuana Demirbaş
19	MF	TUR	Beste Altınelmalı
20	MF	TUR	Betül Bayrakdar

No.	Pos.	Nation	Player
99	MF	TUR	Cansu İriş
7	FW	AZE	Peritan Bozdağ
9	FW	TUR	Demet Dumrul
17	FW	GEO	Ana Kirvalidze
21	FW	TUR	Elif Irmak Çatak
58	FW	TUR	Arife Kübra Gözmener
5		TUR	Melisa Göl
18		NED	Anisah Karahan
22		TUR	Aylin İşi
23		TUR	Pelin Işıl Işık
24		IRN	Hananeh Aminghashghay
61		TUR	Hazal Köse
89		TUR	Kübra Gezer
