= Berthe Andiolo =

Cameroonian footballer (born 1992)

Personal information
- Full name: Berthe Prudence Ongnomo Andiolo
- Date of birth: 15 April 1992 (age 34)
- Place of birth: Cameroon,
- Position: Forward

Senior career*
Years	Team	Apps	(Gls)
2011	FC Minsk		
2015–2016	Amazone FAP		
2019	Canon Yaoundé		
- FC Ebolowa
2021–2022	Galatasaray	11	(2)
2022	Kireçburnu	10	(1)
2023	Adana	4	(6)
2023–	Bornova Hitab	27	(16)

International career
- Cameroon
- * Club domestic league appearances and goals as of 22 December 2024

Berthe Andiolo (born Berthe Prudence Ongnomo Andiolo on 15 April 1992) is a Cameroonian football forward, who plays for Bornova Hitab Spor in the Women's Firstr League in Turkey. She was a member of the Cameroon women's national football team.

== Club career ==
Andiolo played for the Belarusian FC Minsk in 2011. She was a member of Amazone FAP in 2015–2016, Canon Yaoundé in 2019, and FC Ebolowa in her country, before she signed a one-year contract with the newly established Turkish club Galatasaray S.K. in December 2021. In the second half of the 2021–22 Turkish Women's Super League season she transferred to Kireçburnu Spor. The next season she joined Adana İdman Yurdu.

In the 2023–24 season, she transferred to the Women's First League club Bornova Hitab Spor in İzmir. Her team became runners-up, and was promoted to the Super League. After the first half of the 2024–25 Super League season, she left Turkey on 10 January 2025.

== Career statistics ==
As of match played 22 December 2024.

Club	Season	League			Continental		National		Total	
Club	Season	Division	Apps	Goals	Apps	Goals	Apps	Goals	Apps	Goals
Galatasaray S.K.	2021–22	Super League	11	2	–	–	–	–	11	2
Kireçburnu Spor	2021–22	Super League	10	1	–	–	–	–	10	1
Adana İdman Yurdu	2022–23	Super League	4	6	–	–	–	–	4	6
Bornova Hitab Spor	2023–24	First League	16	14	–	-	–	–	16	14
Bornova Hitab Spor	2024–25	Super League	11	2	–	-	–	–	11	02
Bornova Hitab Spor	Total		27	16	–	–	–	–	27	16
Career total			52	25	–	–	–	–	52	25

== Honours ==
Turkish Women's First League

Bornova Hitab
Winners (1): 2023–24
