= Dudullu Spor =

- Full name: Dudullu Spor Kadın Futbol Takımı
- Founded: 1985
- Ground: Dudullu Stadium
- Capacity: 200
- Coordinates: 41°00′51″N 29°09′41″E
- Chairman: Mustafa Bülbül
- Manager: Ekrem Taslak
- League: Turkish Women's Super League
- 2021–22: 10th (Group B)

Dudullu Spor Women's Football (Turkish: Dudullu Spor Kadın Futbol Takımı) is a women's football team based at Yukarı Dudullu neighborhood of Ümraniye district in Istanbul Province, Turkey playing in the Turkish Women's First Football League. It was formed in 2014 as part of the 1985-established Dudullu Football Club. The club's current chairman is Ali Yazlı. The team was promoted from the Women's Second League after the 2019–20 season. to the First League, which was renamed in the 2021–22 season to Super League

== History ==
Dudullu women's football team were formed in 2014, and admitted to the newly established Women's Third League playing in the 2014–15 season in the Group 1. They became group third in the 2015–16 season, and group leader in the following three seasons in a row. Following the 2018–19 season, the team were promoted to the Women's Second League. They were promoted to the Women's First League for the 2020–21 season according to point average by decision of the Turkish Football Federation (TFF) as the season could not be completed due to the outbreak of the COVID-19 pandemic in Turkey. Dudullu was promoted to 1st Division and was one of the founding teams of Turkish Women Superleague in 2021–22 season.

=== Youth team ===
The youth team defeated Antalya Deniz Women 5–0 in the final of the 2023–24 Turkish Girls' Football U17 Championship, and became champion on 18 July 2024, the second time consecutively. The team was honored with the newly established Crystal Feet – Best Youth Academy Team Award for their achievement in the 2023–24 season.

== Stadium ==
The team play home matches at Dudullu Stadium in Yukarı Dudullu, Ümraniye. Built in 1985, it has a seating capacity for 200 spectators. The ground is artificial turf and has floodlights for night games.

== Statistics ==
As of 5 February 2023.

Season	League	Rank	Pld	W	D	L	GF	GA	GD	Pts
2014–15	Thirdt League – Gr. 1	4	14	8	1	5	29	21	+8	25
2015–16	Third League – Gr. 1	3	20	15	2	3	72	10	+62	47
2016–17	Third League – Gr. 1	1	24	23	0	1	140	5	+135	69
2017–18	Third League – Gr. 2	1	10	10	0	0	71	3	+68	30
2018–19	Third League – Gr. 3	1	10	19	1	0	61	2	+59	28
2019–20	Second League	2 (^{1})	16	12	2	2	64	11	+53	38
2020–21	First League Gr. C	4	3	0	0	3	2	13	−11	0
2021–22	Super League Gr. B	10 (^{2})	24	6	4	14	23	60	−37	22
2022–23	Super League Gr. A	8 (^{3})	13	1	2	10	7	30	−23	5
Green marks a season followed by promotion, red a season followed by relegation.

- (^{1}): Promoted after the incomplete season by TFF decision according to point average
- (^{2}): Remained in the Super League after play-outs
- (^{3}): Season in progress

== Current squad ==
As of 5 February 2023

- Head coach: (Turkey) Ekrem Taslak

Note: Flags indicate national team as defined under FIFA eligibility rules; some limited exceptions apply. Players may hold more than one non-FIFA nationality.

No.	Pos.	Nation	Player
1	GK	TUR	Zerda Taşcı
2		TUR	Hümeyra Şanver
3		TUR	Zeynep Okumuş
4		TUR	Doğa Selen Sancar
5		TUR	Suhde Nur Arpacı
7		TUR	Ecemnur Öztürk
8	DF	TUR	Tuana Yılmaz
9		TUR	Tuana Naz Turçin
10		TUR	Dilara Yılmaz
15		TUR	Sıla Güneş

No.	Pos.	Nation	Player
18		TUR	İlayda Tali
19		TUR	Defnesu Aldemir
20		TUR	Ayşe Şeymanur Dereli
22		TUR	Ecren Kızıltepe
23		TUR	Selda Ataç
24		TUR	Ezel Turçin
25		TUR	Afra Yılmaz
28	FW	GAB	Aristelle Luise Yog-Atouth
29	FW	COD	Olga Tshilombo
36	GK	TUR	Ebrar Uluhanlı

== Honours ==
- Crystal Feet – Best Youth Academy Team Award: 2023–24.

Women's Second League
Winners (1): 2019–20

== Kit history ==
2021–22 away

== Squad history ==
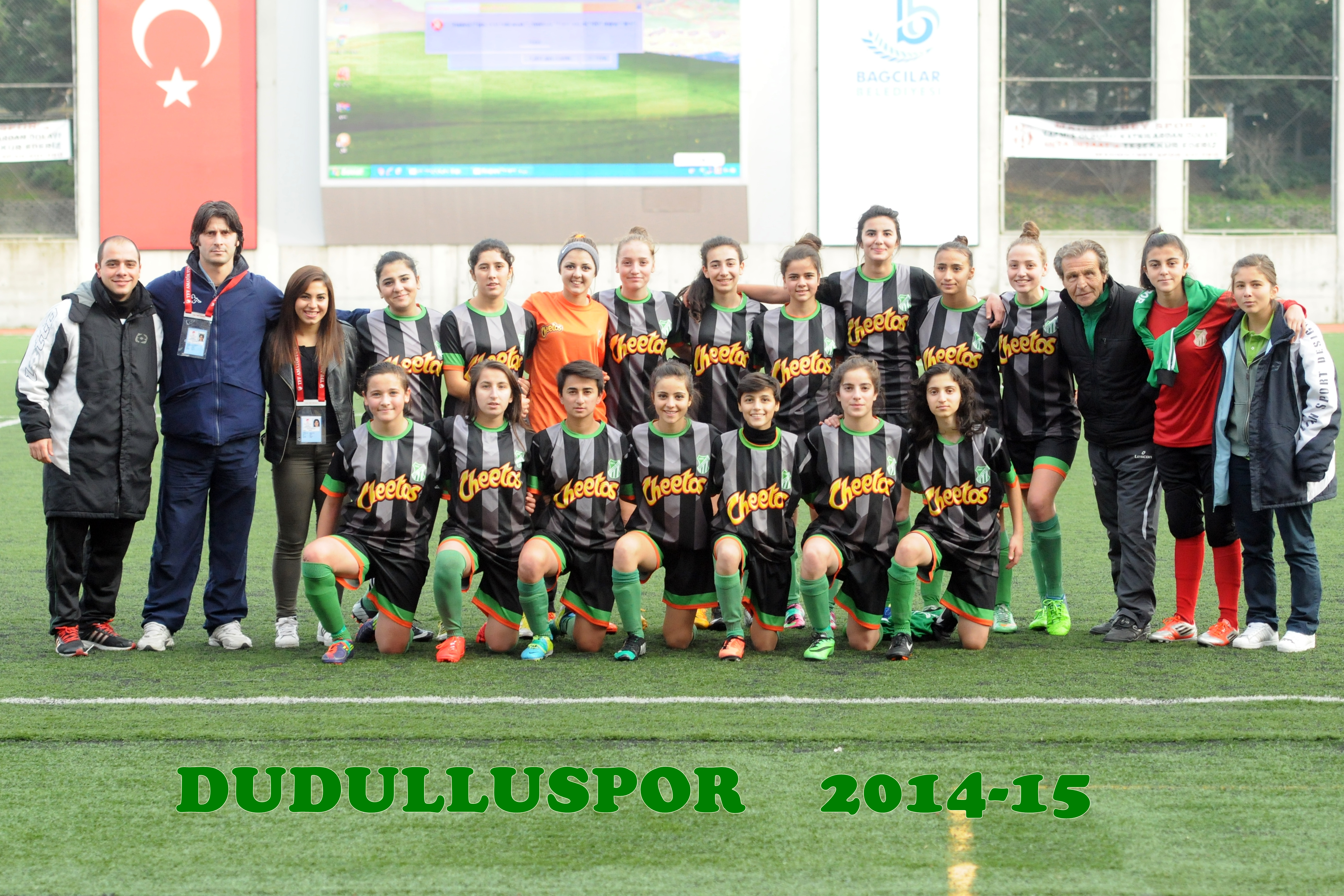
Dudullu Spor in the 2014-15 Women's Third League season
