= Sude Nur Sözüdoğru =

Association football player

Personal information
- Date of birth: 10 June 2002 (age 24)
- Place of birth: Denizli, Turkey
- Position: Goalkeeper

Team information
- Current team: Amed
- Number: 29

Senior career*
Years	Team	Apps	(Gls)
2014–2021	Horozkent	40	(0)
2021–2022	Galatasaray	6	(0)
2022–2023	→ Horozkent	20	(0)
2023	Sancaktepe	2	(0)
2024	Horozkent	3	(0)
2024–2025	Gölbaşı	12	(0)
2025–2026	Horozkent	10	(0)
2026	Sancaktepe	3	(0)
2026–	Amed	1	(0)

International career^{‡}
2018	Turkey U-17	12	(0)
2019	Turkey U-19	3	(0)
- * Club domestic league appearances and goals as of 29 August 2026 ‡ National team caps and goals as of 8 October 2019

Sude Nur Sözüdoğru (born 10 June 2002) is a Turkish women's football goalkeeper, who plays in the Turkish Women's Super League for Amed.

== Club career ==
Sude, who started football at Horozkent Spor in Denizli, transferred to the newly established Galatasaray club in the 2021–22 Super League season.

On 13 August 2022, the player was rented by Galatasaray to Horozkent Spor, the club where she started football, for 1 year.

== International career ==
As part of the Turkey girls' U-17 team, she played at the UEFA Women's Under-17 Championship qualification matches of 2018 and 2019 as well as 2018 UEFA Women's U-16 Development Tournament.

She was a member of the Turkey women's U-19 team. She appeared in the 2020 UEFA Women's U-19 Championship qualification - Group 12 matches.

By July 2020, she was called up to the Turkey women's national team.

== Career statistics ==
As of 29 August 2026

Club	Season	League			Continental		National		Total	
Club	Season	Division	Apps	Goals	Apps	Goals	Apps	Goals	Apps	Goals
Horozkent	2016–17	Third League Gr. 3	21	0	–	–	–	–	21	0
Horozkent	2017–18	Third League Gr. 15	9	0	–	–	6	0	15	0
Horozkent	2018–19	Third League Gr. 7	5	0	–	–	6	0	11	0
Horozkent	2019–20	Third League Gr. 3	5	0	–	–	3	0	8	0
Horozkent	Total		40	0	–	–	15	0	55	0
Galatasaray	2021–22	Super League	6	0	–	–	0	0	6	0
→ Horozkent	2022–23	First League	20	0	–	–	0	0	20	0
Sancaktepe	2023	Third League	2	0	–	–	0	0	2	0
Horozkent	2024	First League	3	0	–	–	0	0	3	0
Gölbaşı	2024–2025	First League	12	0	–	–	0	0	12	0
Horozkent	2025–2026	First League	10	0	–	–	0	0	10	0
Sancaktepe	2026	Second League	3	0	–	–	0	0	3	0
Amed	2026–27	Super League	1	0	–	–	0	0	1	0
Career total			97	0	–	–	15	0	112	0
