= Yeşilova Kemal Aktaş Stadium =

Football stadium in Küçükçekmece, Istanbul, Turkey

- Yeşilova Kemal Aktaş Stadı
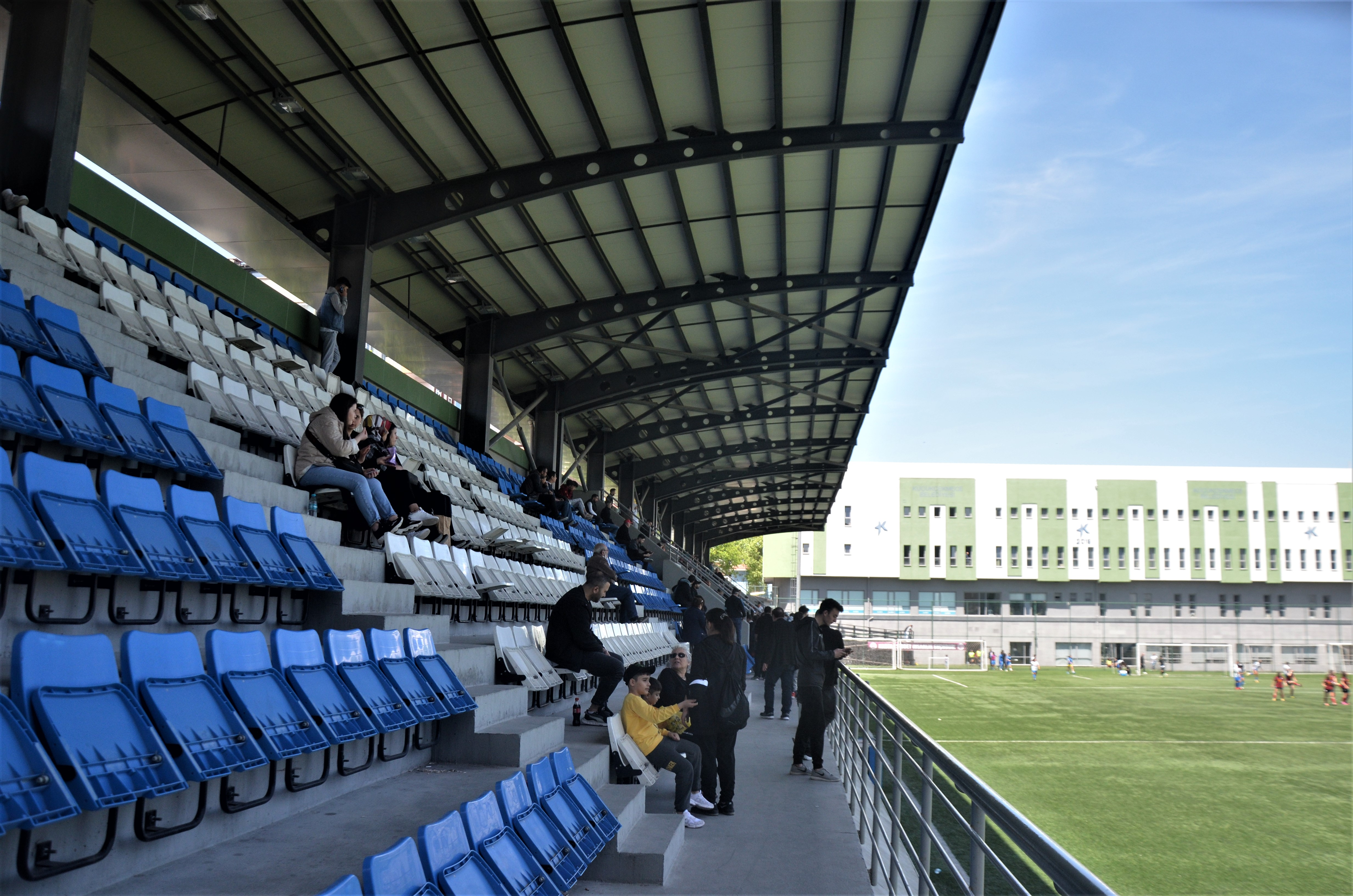
- Yeşilova Kemal Aktaş Stadium

- Location within Istanbul
- Former names: Yeşilova Stadium
- Location: Gültepe, Küçükçekmece, Istanbul, Turkey
- Coordinates: 40.98979°N 28.79063°E
- Owner: Küçükçekmece Municipality
- Capacity: 1,500
- Type: Stadium
- Event: Football
- Surface: Artificial turf

Construction
- Opened: 2011; 15 years ago

Yeşilova Kemal Aktaş Stadium (Turkish: Yeşilova Kemal Aktaş Stadı) is a football stadium in Küçükçekmece district of Istanbul, Turkey. It is owned by the district municipality. It is the home ground of Galatasaray S.K. women's football team.

The stadium is situated at Barbaros Ave. 30 in the Gültepe neighborhood of Küçükçekmece. Opened in 2011, it is owned by the Küçükçekmece Municipality. Formerly known as the Yeşilova Stadium, it was renamed in 2013 after the district resident Kemal Aktaş (1967–2008), a Galatasaray youth setup and former profession footballer died from heart attack during a friendly football game.

The stadium has a seating capacity of 1,500 spectators. The pitch with the dimensions 57 m × 90 m (187 ft × 295 ft) has artificial turf ground.

== Gallery ==
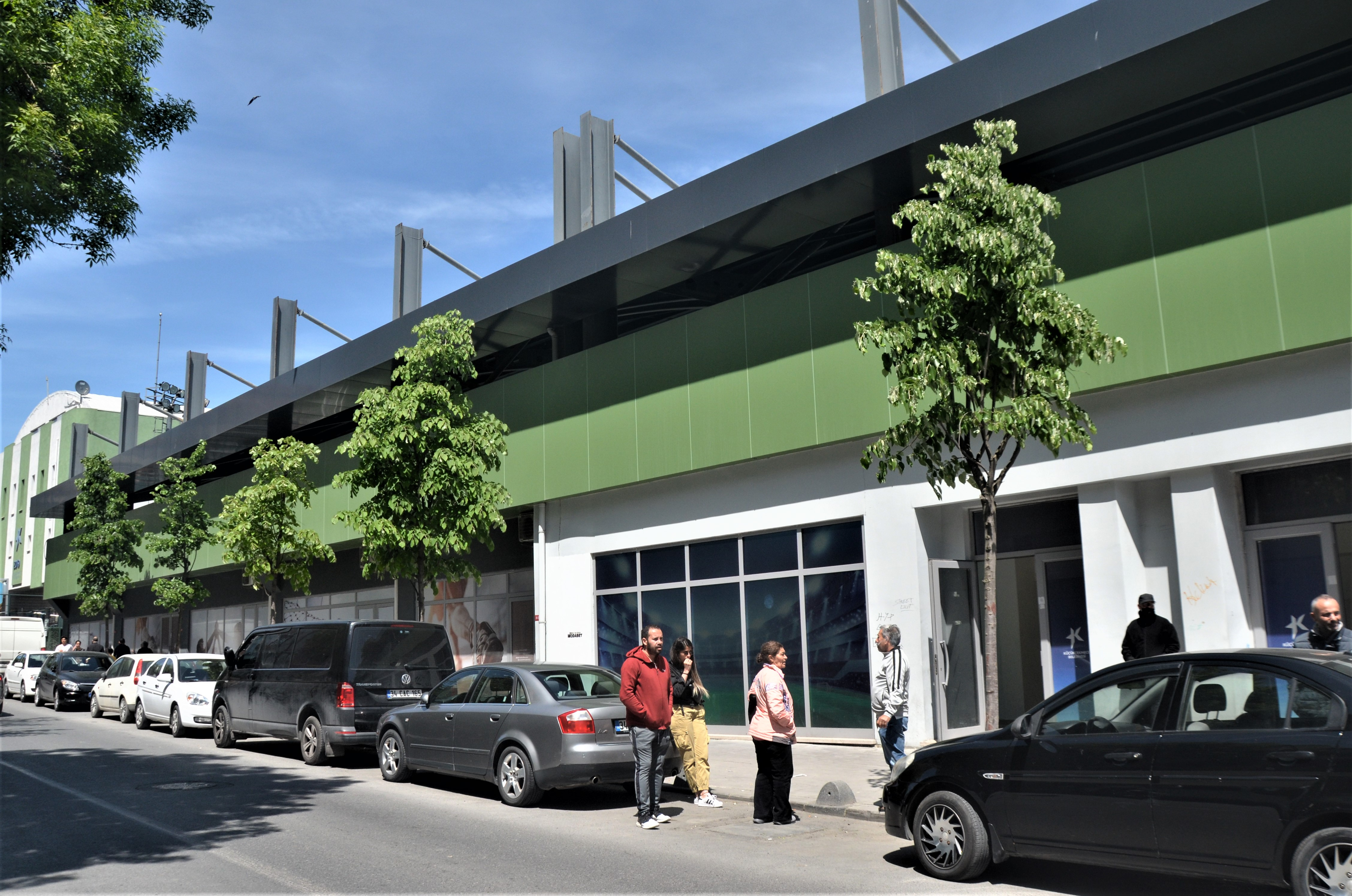
Exterior of File:Yeşilova Kemal Aktaş Stadium

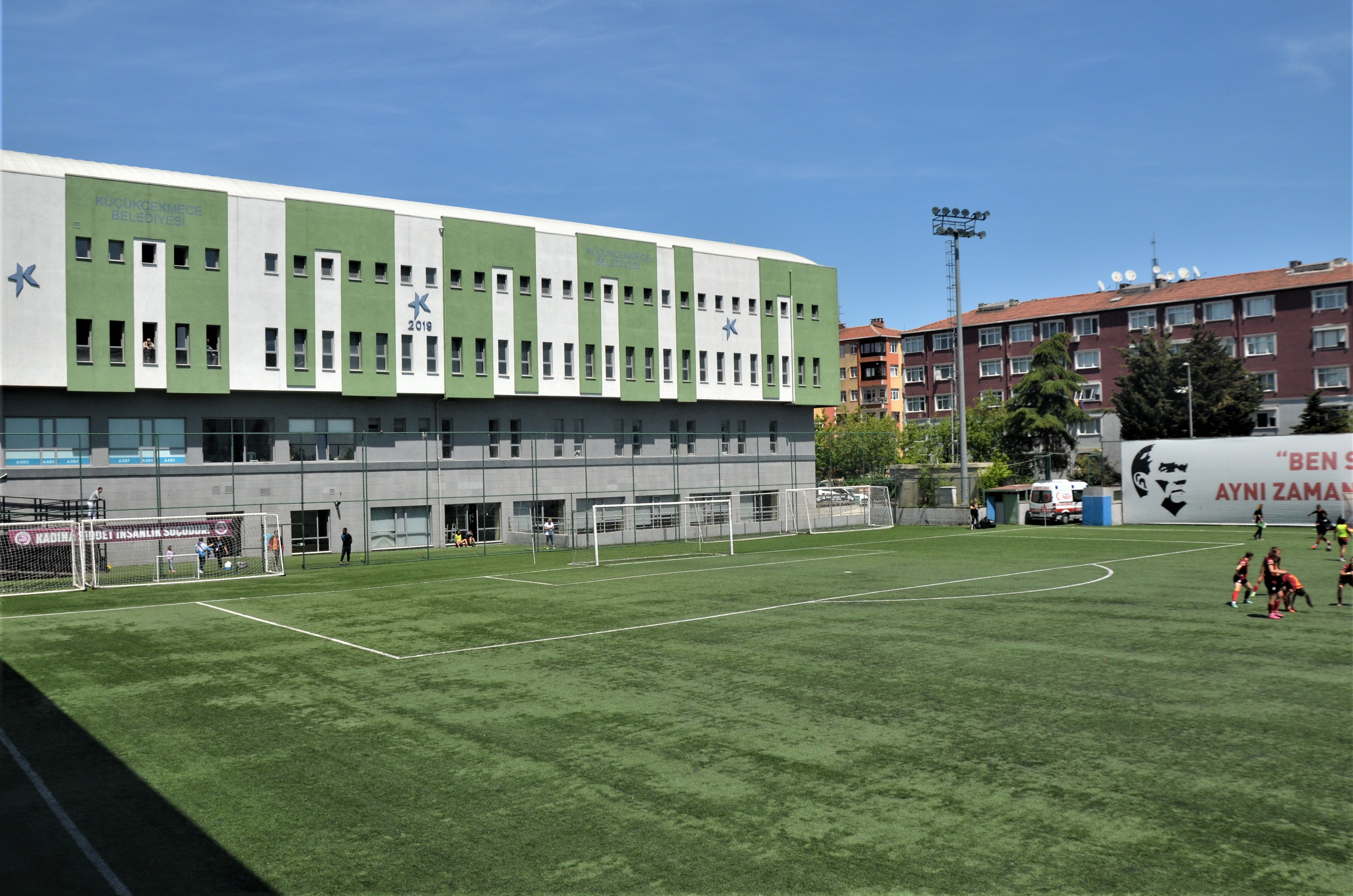
Yeşilova Kemal Aktaş Stadium

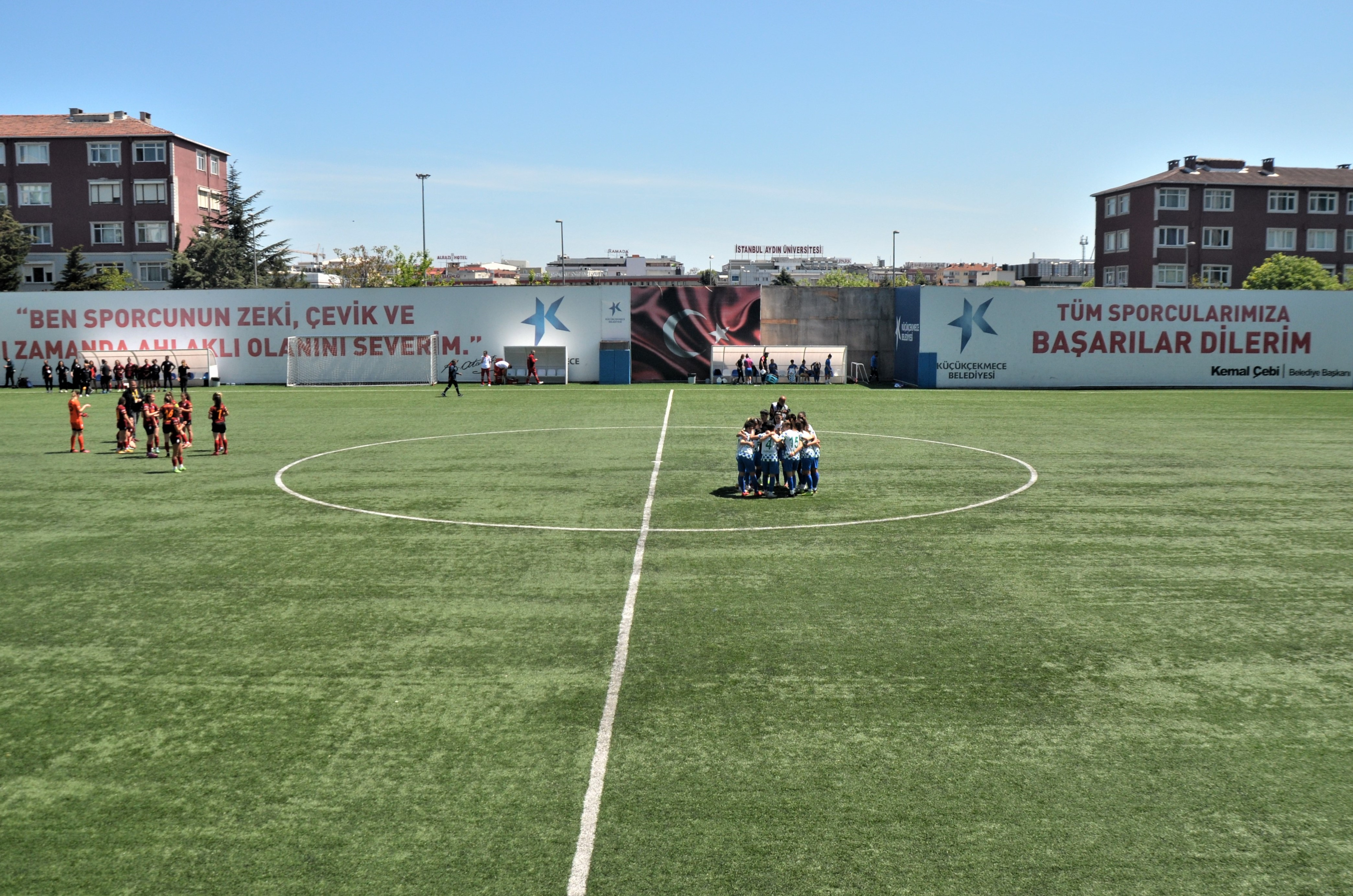
Yeşilova Kemal Aktaş Stadium
