= Milica Denda =

Serbian footballer (born 2002)

Personal information
- Date of birth: 11 December 2002 (age 23)
- Place of birth: Novi Sad, Serbia, FR Yugoslavia
- Height: 1.67 m (5 ft 5 1/2 in)
- Position: Defender

Team information
- Current team: Emina Mostar
- Number: 25

Senior career*
| Years | Team | Apps | (Gls) |
- ŠF "Siniša Mihajlović"
- ŽFK Vojvodina
| 2019–2020 | Spartak Subotica | | |
| 2021–2023 | Galatasaray | 38 | (9) |
| 2023 | Red Star Belgrade | | |
| 2024 | ŽFK Vojvodina | 7 | (0) |
| 2024– | Emina Mostar | 17 | (3) |

International career
- Serbia U17
- Serbia U19
| 2022 | Serbia | 2 | (0) |
- * Club domestic league appearances and goals as of 3 April 2026 (UTC)

Milica Denda (Serbian Cyrillic: Милица Денда; born 11 December 2002) is a professional footballer who plays as a defender for Bosnian Premier League club Emina Mostar. Born in Serbia, she has committed to play for the Bosnia and Herzegovina national team.

== Club career ==
Denda played for ŠF "Siniša Mihajlović", ŽFK Vojvodina, and Spartak Subotica in Serbia. With Spartak, she won the Serbian Super League title in the 2019–20 season, and took part at the UEFA Champions League.

=== Galatasaray ===
By December 2021, she moved to Turkey and joined the newly established team Galatasaray.

== International career ==
She played for the Serbia national under-17 team and then their under-19 team before she became a member of the Serbia women's team.

On 2 April 2026, Denda's request to switch allegiance to Bosnia and Herzegovina was approved by FIFA.

== Honours ==
Spartak Subotica

- Serbian Women's Super League: 2019–20
