= Dajana Spasojević =

Bosnian footballer (born 1997)

Personal information
- Date of birth: 29 October 1997 (age 29)
- Height: 1.73 m (5 ft 8 in)
- Position: Forward

Team information
- Current team: Galatasaray

Senior career*
Years	Team	Apps	(Gls)
2016–2018	SFK 2000		
2018–2019	IK Grand		
2019–2021	SFK 2000		
2022	Galatasaray	9	(0)
2022–	SFK 2000	0	(0)

International career^{‡}
- Bosnia and Herzegovina
- * Club domestic league appearances and goals as of 19:27, 30 August 2019 (UTC) ‡ National team caps and goals as of 19:27, 30 August 2019 (UTC)

Dajana Spasojević (born 29 October 1997) is a Bosnian footballer who plays as a forward for the Sarajevo-based club SFK 2000 and the Bosnia and Herzegovina women's national team.

== Club career ==
On 8 March 2022, the Turkish Women's Football Super League team was transferred to the Galatasaray club.

== International career ==
Spasojević has been capped for the Bosnia and Herzegovina national team, appearing for the team during the 2019 FIFA Women's World Cup qualifying cycle.
