= Samia Adam =

Egyptian footballer (born 1996)

Personal information
- Full name: Samia Ahmed Mohammed Adam
- Date of birth: 19 April 1996 (age 30)
- Place of birth: Palo Alto, California, U.S.
- Height: 1.80 m (5 ft 11 in)
- Positions: Midfielder; defender

Team information
- Current team: Napoli

Youth career
- 2010-2014: Santa Clara Bruins
- 2007-2014: DeAnza Force

College career
Years	Team	Apps	(Gls)
2014–2018	Pacific Tigers	53	(3)

Senior career*
Years	Team	Apps	(Gls)
2021	El Gouna		
2021–2022	Galatasaray	17	(4)
2022–23	Napoli	19	(5)
2023–	FC Dornbirn	6	(0)

International career^{‡}
2016–	Egypt	8	(1)
- * Club domestic league appearances and goals as of 17 October 2023 ‡ National team caps and goals as of 25 November 2016.

Samia Ahmed Mohammed Adam (Arabic: سامية احمد محمد ادم; born 19 April 1996) is an Egyptian footballer who plays as a midfielder for FC Dornbirn and the Egypt women's national team.

== Early life ==
Adam was born in Palo Alto, California and raised in Santa Clara, California.

== High school and college career ==
Adam has attended the Santa Clara High School in her hometown and the University of the Pacific in Stockton, California.

== Club career ==
Adam has played for the teams El Gouna and Kafr Saad in Egypt. She later joined Galatasaray, becoming the first Egyptian to play professionally in the Turkish Women's Football Super League. She also served as captain. She was the top scorer for her team in the Turkish Women's League for the 2021–22 season with six goals in nine matches.

After her contract with Galatasaray ended, she joined the Italian Serie B club Napoli in September 2022, making her the first Egyptian to play in Italy. Napoli achieved promotion to Serie A at the end of the 2022–23 season.

In 2023, Adam moved to FC Dornbirn Ladies in the ÖFB Frauen Bundesliga.

== International career ==
Adam capped for Egypt at senior level during the 2016 Africa Women Cup of Nations. She appeared in the 2021 Arab Women's Cup. She played in two 2022 friendlies against Jordan. She was called up for 2024 Women's Africa Cup of Nations qualifiers against South Sudan. She scored the opening goal in both legs of Egypt's 8-0 aggregate victory.
