= Samsun Yabancılar Pazarı S.K. =

Samsun YAB-PA S.K.
- Full name: Samsun Yabancılar Pazarı Spor Kulübü
- Founded: 2010; 15 years ago
- Ground: İlkadım Derebahçe Stadıum
- Capacity: 2,500
- Coordinates: 41°15′34″N 36°19′45″E
- Chairman: Ali Akyüz
- Manager: (Turkey) Bünyamin Kubat
- League: Women's First League
- 2022–23: 9th

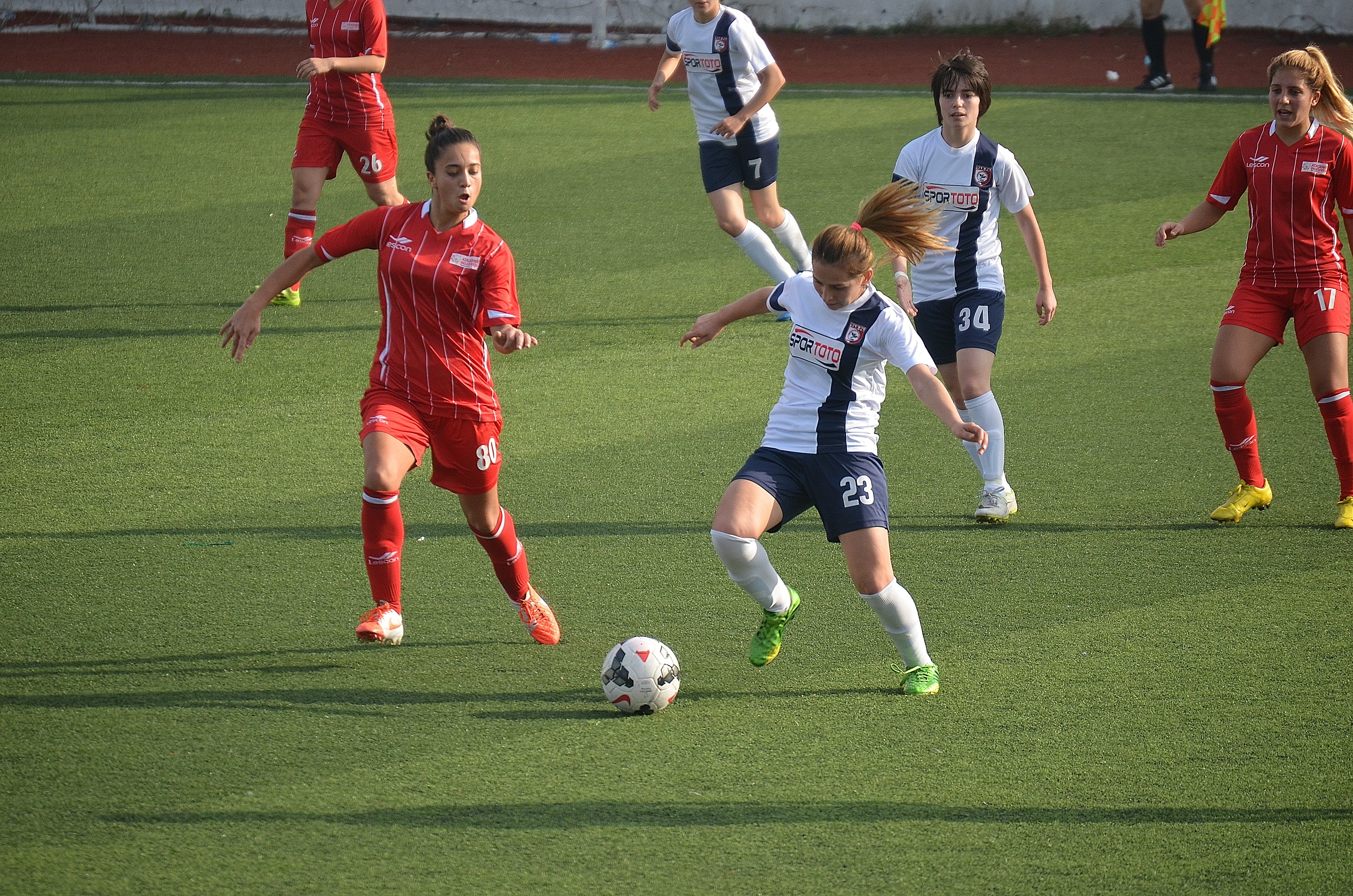
İlkadım Belediyesi Yabancılar Pazarı Spor in the 2014–15 season's away match against Ataşehir Belediyespor.

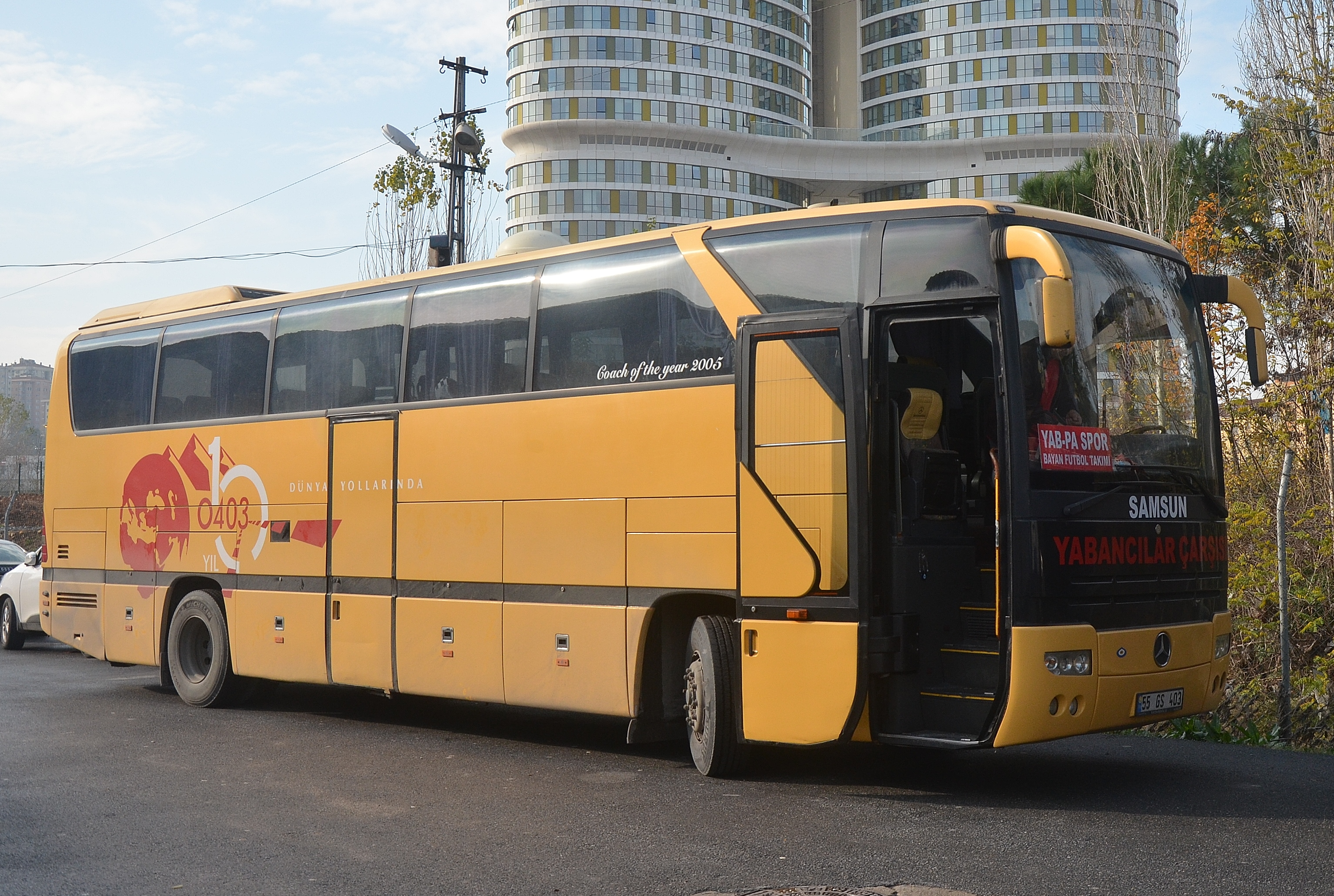
Club bus of İlkadım Belediyespor.

Samsun Yabancılar Pazarı S.K. is a women's football team based in İlkadım district of Samsun, Turkey. The club is chaired by Sezai Onaran, and its manager is Arif İmamoğlu.

== History ==
After finishing the 2013–14 season in the Division 3 of Women's Second League undefeated, and winning the play-off match in the second leg against Ovacık Gençlik ve Spor, the team was promoted to play in the 2014–15 season of Women's First League. Founded in 2010 by the municipality of İlkadım district as the women's football team of its multi-branch club İlkadım Belediyespor, the team changed its name in July 2014 after signing a sponsorship agreement with the trader's organization of Yabancılar Pazarı (literally: Foreigners' Market). The new leadership took over also the operation of the sports facility İlkadım Derebahçe Stadıum. They finished the 2014–15 season at 6th place. After a total of four seasons in the Women's First League, the team was relegated to the Second League at the end of the 2017–18 League season. After two seasons in the Women's Second League, the team were promoted to the Women's First League againaccording to point average by decision of the Turkish Football Federation (TFF) as the season could not be completed due to the outbreak of the COVID-19 pandemic in Turkey.

Team name history

2010–2011	İlkadım Belediyespor
2011–2023	İlkadım Belediyesi Yabancılar Pazarı S.K.
2023–	Samsun Yabancılar Pazarı S.K.

== Stadium ==
Samsun Yabancılar Pazarı S.K. play their home matches at İlkadım Derebahçe Stadıum in Samsun.

== Statistics ==
As of 9 October 2023.

Season	League	Pos.	Pld	W	D	L	GF	GA	GD	Pts
2010–11	Regional League Div. Anatolia	3	10	5	2	3	25	12	+13	17
2011–12	Second League – Div. Black Sea	4	8	3	0	5	20	16	+4	9
2012–13	Second League – Div. 4	2	10	7	2	1	33	9	+24	23
2013–14	Second League Div. 3	1	16	16	0	0	81	3	+78	48
2014–15	First League	6	18	6	3	9	24	34	−10	21
2015–16	First League	8	18	5	3	11	22	51	−29	17
2016–17	First League	6	26	11	4	11	38	48	−10	37
2017–18	First League	10	18	2	3	13	13	49	−36	9
2018–19	Second League	4	28	20	0	8	81	36	+45	60
2019–20	Second League	1	16	13	2	1	77	12	+465	41 (^{1})
2020–21	First League Gr. A	11	2 (^{2})	1	0	1	4	13	−9	3
2021–22	Super League Gr. B	12	22	3	3	16	20	75	−55	9
2022–23	First League	9	24	7	4	13	33	50	−17	27
'Green marks a season followed by promotion, red a season followed by relegation.

- (^{1}) Promoted after the incomplete season by TFF decision according to point average
- (^{2}) Did not show up in one match after the half time
- (^{3}) Season in progress

== Current squad ==
As of 9 March 2022.

Head coach: (Turkey) Bünyamin Kubat

Note: Flags indicate national team as defined under FIFA eligibility rules; some limited exceptions apply. Players may hold more than one non-FIFA nationality.

No.	Pos.	Nation	Player
1	GK	TUR	Zeynep Efsanur Koyun
2		TUR	Gülçin Güloğlu }
4		TUR	Nehir Zeytünlü
5		TUR	Gülseren Selvi Selvi
6		TUR	Gamze Ekici
7		TUR	Havanur Balcı
12	GK	TUR	Eylem Özbütün
14		TUR	Elif Yamanoğlu
17		TUR	Gülçin Güloğlu
18		TUR	Zeliha Giden
20		TUR	Kübra Özsoy

No.	Pos.	Nation	Player
21		TUR	Ece İrem Tilbe
23		TUR	Sudenaz Avcı
25	MF	TOG	Takiyatou Yaya
26		SLE	Jeneba Koroma
27		SLE	Kamara Salamatu
28		SLE	Wuyah Sao Mohai
29		SLE	Saio M. Quraishi
38		TUR	Esra Karaoğlu
39	FW	SLE	Zainab Macauley
55		TUR	Arzu Şimşek
72		TUR	Yeliz Ot

== Former managers ==
- (Turkey) Bünyamin Kubat
- (Turkey) Arif İmamoğlu
- (Turkey) Akın Türker
- (Turkey) Sezai Onaran

== Kit history ==
2014–15 home	2014–15 away	2016–17 away	2017–18 away	2018–19 away	2021–22 home
2021–22 away

== Squads ==
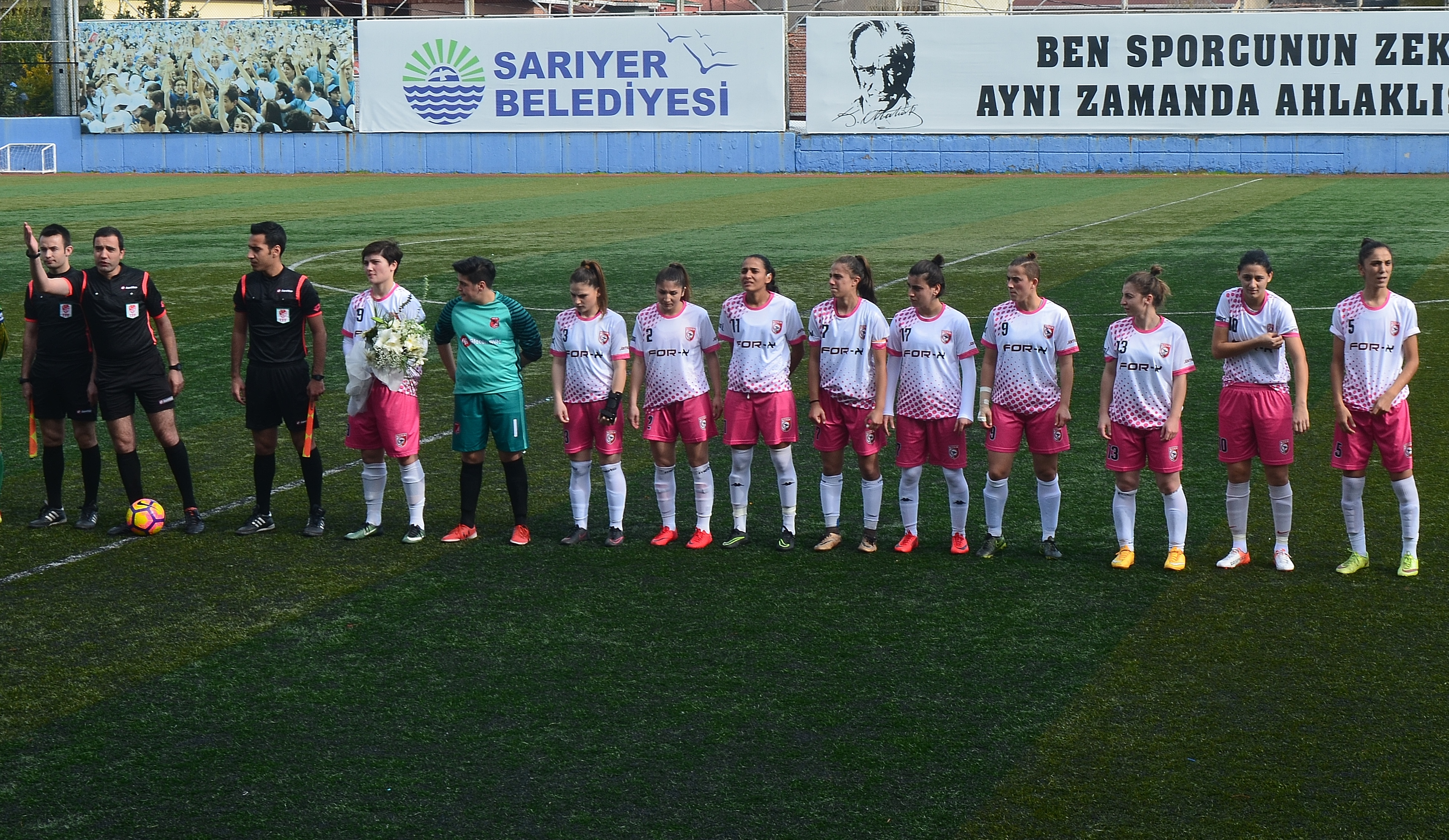
İlkadım Belediyespor squad in the away match of 2017–18 season vs Kireçburnu Spor .
