= 2021–22 Turkish Women's Football Super League =

Turkcell Women's Football Super League
- Season: 2021–22
- Dates: 18 December 2021 – 12 June 2022
- Champions: ALG Spor
- Relegated: Sivasspor, Kayserispor, Kocaeli Bayan FK, İlkadım Belediyesi
- Champions League: ALG Spor
- Matches: 285
- Goals: 1,057 (3.71 per match)
- Top goalscorer: (Trinidad and Tobago) Kennya Cordner (34 goals)
- Biggest home win: FOMGET 13-0 Kocaeli Bayan FK
- Biggest away win: İlkadım Belediyesi 0-11 ALG Spor, Altay 0-11 Fenerbahçe
- Highest scoring: FOMGET 13-0 Kocaeli Bayan FK
- Longest winning run: Beşiktaş (11 matches)
- Longest unbeaten run: ALG Spor (19 matches), Fenerbahçe (19 matches)
- All statistics correct as of 12 June 2022.

The 2021–22 Turkcell Women's Football Super League (Turkish: Turkcell Kadın Futbol Süper Ligi 2021-2022 Sezonu) was the inaugural season of the Turkish Women's Football Super League. The league, which started in the 2021-22 season was positioned above the Turkish Women's Football First League, which was previously the highest-level league in the women's football pyramid in Turkey.

The league consists of 24 teams with addition of eight newly established women's football sides of major Süper Lig clubs to the former 16 teams of the 2020–21 Turkcell Women's Football League. Promoted eight teams are Altay, Çaykur Rizespor, Fatih Karagümrük, Fenerbahçe, Galatasaray, Hatayspor, Sivassspor and Trabzonspor.

The matches will be played in two groups of each 12 teams. The league starts on 18 December 2021 and ends on 4 May 2022, having a half-season break between 13 and 24 February 2022. Following the regular season, four leading teams of each group will play play-off matches. The league champion will represent Turkey at the 2022–23 UEFA Women's Champions League. The last four teams of the two groups will play-out matches, and the losing four teams will be relegated to the Turkish Women's Second Football League. Play-off and play-out matches will take place between 14 May and 12 June 2022.

Domestic players born before 31 December 2005 are eligible only. Teams are permitted to have up to six foreign players.

== Teams ==
=== Team changes ===
Relegated from 2020–21 Turkcell League	Promoted 2021 established teams
None	Altay; Çaykur Rizespor; Fatih Karagümrük; Fenerbahçe; Galatasaray; Hatayspor; Sivasspor; Trabzonspor

Location of teams in Turkey in the 2021–22 season of Turkcell Women's Football Super League
Location of teams in Istanbul in the 2021–22 season of Turkcell Women's Football Super League

Season 2021–22
Team	Hometown	Ground	Capacity	2020–21 finish
1207 Antalya Spor	Antalya	Zeytinköy Stadium's Field #3		3/4 in groups
Adana İdmanyurduspor	Adana	Gençlik Stadium	2,000	5/16 in league
ALG Spor	Gaziantep	Batur Stadium		3/16 in league
Altay	İzmir	Alsancak Mustafa Denizli Stadium	14,000	—
Amed Sportif Faaliyetler	Diyarbakır	Talaytepe Sports Facility		4/4 in groups
Ataşehir Belediyespor	Istanbul	Yeni Sahra Stadium	700	5/16 in league
Beşiktaş J.K.	Istanbul	İsmet İnönü Stadium	800	champion
Çaykur Rizespor	Rize	Mehmet Cengiz Facility Field #3		—
Dudullu Spor	Istanbul	Dudullu Stadium		4/4 in groups
Fatih Karagümrük S.K.	Istanbul	Vefa Stadium	5,500	—
Fatih Vatan Spor	Istanbul	Fatih Mimar Sinan Stadium		2/16 in league
Fenerbahçe S.K.	Istanbul	Beylerbeyi 75. Yıl Stadium	5,500	—
Ankara BB Fomget GS	Ankara	Batıkent Stadium		4/16 in league
Galatasaray S.K.	Istanbul	Yeşilova Kemal Aktaş Stadium	1,500	—
Hakkarigücü Spor	Hakkari	Merzan City Football Field		4/4 in groups
Hatayspor	Hatay	Defne Atatürk Stadium		—
İlkadım Belediyesi	Samsun	İlkadım Derebahçe Stadıum		3/4 in groups
Kdz. Ereğlispor	Karadeniz Ereğli	Beyçayir Football Field		3/4 in groups
Kayserispor	Kayseri	Argıncık Stadium, Field No. 2		5/16 in league
Kireçburnu Spor	Istanbul	Çayırbaşı Stadium	5,000	3/4 in groups
Kocaeli Bayan FK	İzmit	Mehmet Ali Kağıtçı Stadium		4/4 in groups
Konak Belediyespor	İzmir	Atatürk Stadyum 1 no'lu Yan Saha		5/16 in league
Sivasspor	Sivas	Cumhuriyet University Stadium		—
Trabzonspor	Trabzon	Mehmet Ali Yılmaz Stadium	3,000	—

== Qualifying stage ==
=== Group A ===
Pos	Team	Pld	W	D	L	GF	GA	GD	Pts	Qualification	FEN	BJK	FVA	ANT	FOM	KDZ	AMD	ATA	ALT	HAT	KOC	KIR
1	Fenerbahçe	22	19	1	2	104	15	+89	58	Quarterfinals	—	2–1	2–1	5–0	2–1	6–1	3–1	4–0	8–0	6–0	8–0	10–1
2	Beşiktaş	22	19	0	3	104	18	+86	57	Quarterfinals	2–1	—	3–0	4–0	3–5	2–0	6–0	6–3	12–0	2–0	6–0	11–0
3	Fatih Vatan	22	15	2	5	45	19	+26	47	Quarterfinals	1–0	0–1	—	1–1	1–0	0–0	6–0	1–0	2–1	1–0	4–2	3–0
4	1207 Antalya	22	15	2	5	51	24	+27	47	Quarterfinals	1–2	3–2	1–2	—	0–0	1–0	2–1	1–0	6–0	6–0	3–1	3–1
5	Ankara BB Fomget	22	15	2	5	76	16	+60	47		1–1	0–1	1–2	0–1	—	2–0	1–0	4–0	1–0	4–0	13–0	12–0
6	Kdz. Ereğli	22	12	2	8	50	34	+16	38		0–2	1–7	2–1	2–0	2–4	—	3–0	2–0	4–0	2–3	5–0	6–0
7	Amed	22	8	1	13	30	51	−21	25		1–2	0–7	3–2	0–1	0–2	0–2	—	0–3	4–0	2–1	5–2	0–1
8	Ataşehir	22	8	0	14	34	38	−4	24		0–3	1–2	0–1	0–2	1–2	1–2	0–2	—	1–0	1–0	4–1	5–1
9	Altay	22	4	1	17	21	91	−70	13	Play-out	0–11	1–5	2–5	0–5	0–10	0–7	2–3	1–3	—	0–0	4–0	5–2
10	Hatayspor	22	3	3	16	20	62	−42	12	Play-out	1–8	1–5	0–3	0–3	1–2	1–2	3–3	3–0	0–3	—	2–3	2–2
11	Kocaeli (R)	22	3	1	18	27	104	−77	10	Play-out	2–7	0–10	0–4	1–7	1–7	2–5	2–3	0–4	1–2	3–0	—	1–1
12	Kireçburnu	22	2	3	17	14	104	−90	9	Play-out	0–10	0–6	0–4	1–4	0–4	2–2	0–2	0–7	1–0	1–2	0–5	—

Source: TFF.org
(R) Relegated

=== Group B ===
Pos	Team	Pld	W	D	L	GF	GA	GD	Pts	Qualification	ALG	FKA	KON	HAK	ADA	GAL	RIZ	TRA	SIV	DUD	KAY	ILK
1	ALG	22	19	2	1	93	3	+90	59	Quarterfinals	—	2–0	2–0	1–0	5–0	5–1	4–0	3–0	3–0	10–0	7–0	9–0
2	Fatih Karagümrük	22	16	4	2	52	14	+38	52	Quarterfinals	1–0	—	2–0	2–0	1–1	1–0	3–2	1–0	3–0	2–0	3–0	6–0
3	Konak	22	12	7	3	36	16	+20	43	Quarterfinals	0–0	1–1	—	1–0	0–0	2–1	1–1	2–0	2–0	0–2	1–1	3–0
4	Hakkari	22	13	4	5	46	18	+28	43	Quarterfinals	0–0	1–1	1–4	—	1–0	1–0	1–0	2–4	4–0	6–0	4–0	5–1
5	Adana	22	10	5	7	40	30	+10	35		0–4	0–3	1–1	0–0	—	2–0	4–3	2–1	0–1	2–0	10–0	3–2
6	Galatasaray	22	8	5	9	35	31	+4	29		0–3	2–1	1–1	1–1	1–1	—	1–3	2–1	3–0	4–1	4–0	0–1
7	Çaykur Rizespor	22	7	4	11	32	35	−3	25		0–3	1–2	1–2	1–2	3–1	2–2	—	1–2	1–0	2–0	3–0	3–0
8	Trabzonspor	22	7	3	12	28	33	−5	24		0–4	1–1	1–2	0–1	0–3	1–2	2–0	—	2–0	3–0	3–1	1–1
9	Sivasspor (R)	22	6	1	15	18	50	−32	19	Play-out	1–6	1–3	0–2	1–4	0–5	2–1	1–1	2–0	—	4–2	0–1	2–1
10	Dudullu	22	5	3	14	20	59	−39	18	Play-out	0–7	0–2	0–3	1–4	0–1	1–2	2–2	1–1	2–1	—	4–1	1–0
11	Kayseri (Note: Kayserispor had 3 points deducted) (R)	22	4	3	15	11	67	−56	12	Play-out	0–4	1–8	0–6	0–4	1–2	0–0	1–0	1–0	0–1	0–1	—	2–1
12	İlkadım (Note: İlkadım Belediyesi Yabancılar Pazarıspor had 3 points deducted) (R)	22	3	3	16	20	75	−55	9	Play-out	0–11	1–5	1–2	0–4	3–2	0–6	1–2	1–5	4–1	1–1	1–1	—

Source: TFF.org
(R) Relegated

== Knockout stage ==
=== Play–outs ===
Team 1	Agg.	Team 2	1st leg	2nd leg
Altay S.K.	3–1	İlkadım Belediye YabPa Spor	1–0	2–1
Sivasspor	3–3 (p 5–6)	Kireçburnu Spor	1–1	2–2
Kocaeli Bayan FK	1–3	Dudullu Spor	1–1	0–2
Kayserispor	2–2 (p 3–6)	Hatayspor	2–0	0–2

==== Relegated teams ====
- İlkadım Belediye YabPa Spor
- Kayserispor
- Kocaeli Bayan FK
- Sivasspor

=== Play–offs ===
==== Bracket ====
Quarterfinals
Fenerbahçe	1	3	4
Hakkarigücü Spor	1	0	1
Fatih Vatan Spor	0	0	0
Fatih Karagümrük	0	2	2
ALG Spor	1	4	5
1207 Antalya Spor	0	0	0
Beşiktaş	1	4	5
Konak Belediyespor	0	2	2

Semifinals
Fenerbahçe	0	2	2
Fatih Karagümrük	1	2	3
ALG Spor	2	2	4
Beşiktaş	0	1	1

Finals
Fatih Karagümrük	1
ALG Spor	2

Quarterfinals

Team 1	Agg.	Team 2	1st leg	2nd leg
Fenerbahçe S.K.	4–1	Hakkarigücü Spor	1–1	3–0
ALG Spor	5–0	1207 Antalya Spor	1–0	4–0
Beşiktaş J.K.	5–2	Konak Belediyespor	1–0	4–2
Fatih Vatan Spor	0–2	Fatih Karagümrük S.K.	0–0	0–2

Semifinals

Team 1	Agg.	Team 2	1st leg	2nd leg
Fenerbahçe S.K.	2–3	Fatih Karagümrük S.K.	0–1	2–2
ALG Spor	4–1	Beşiktaş J.K.	2–0	2–1

Final

Team 1	Score	Team 2
Fatih Karagümrük S.K.	1 - 2	ALG Spor

== Top goalscorers ==
As of 12 June 2022.

Rank	Player	Team	GS	Pld	AG
1	(Trinidad and Tobago) Kennya Cordner	Fenerbahçe S.K.	34	25	1.36
2	(Tunisia) Mariem Houij	ALG Spor	29	27	1.07
3	(England) Shameeka Fishley	Fenerbahçe S.K.	23	23	1

== Hat-tricks and more ==
Player	Scored	For	Against	Result	Date	Ref.
(Georgia (country)) Ana Cheminava	3	Fomget G.S.	Kireçburnu Spor	12–0	18 December 2021	
(Trinidad and Tobago) Kennya Cordner	3	Fenerbahçe S.K.	1207 Antalyaspor	5–0	25 December 2021	
(Tunisia) Mariem Houij	5	ALG Spor	Dudullu Spor	10–0	29 December 2021	
(Tunisia) Mariem Houij	3	ALG Spor	Trabzonspor	4–0	8 January 2022	
(Democratic Republic of the Congo) Marlène Kasaj	3	Adana İdman Yurdu	Sivasspor	5–0	8 January 2022	
(Turkey) Zeynep Gamze Koçer	3	Beşiktaş J.K.	Hatayspor	5–1	9 January 2022	
(Turkey) Arzu Karabulut	3	Beşiktaş J.K.	Kireçburnu Spor	11–0	12 January 2022	
(Ghana) Gifty Assifuah	3	1207 Antalyaspor	Altay S.K.	5–0	12 January 2022	
(Iran) Fatemeh Ghasemi	4	Ataşehir Belediyespor	Kireçburnu Spor	7–0	16 January 2022	
(Turkey) Elanur Laçin	4	Galatasaray S.K.	İlkadım Belediye YabPa Spor	6–0	22 January 2022	
(England) Shameeka Fishley	3	Fenerbahçe S.K.	Hatayspor	8–1	24 January 2022	
(Trinidad and Tobago) Kennya Cordner	3	Fenerbahçe S.K.	Kireçburnu Spor	10–0	2 February 2022	
(Turkey) Berdan Bozkurt	3	Fenerbahçe S.K.	Kireçburnu Spor	10–0	2 February 2022	
(Trinidad and Tobago) Kennya Cordner	3	Fenerbahçe S.K.	Kocaeli Bayan FK	8–0	6 February 2022	
(Namibia) Zenatha Coleman	3	Fenerbahçe S.K.	Kocaeli Bayan FK	8–0	6 February 2022	
(Kenya) Jentrix Shikangwa	3	Fatih Karagümrğk	İlkadım Belediye YabPa Spor	6–0	9 February 2022	
(Turkey) Gizem Gönültaş	3	Beşiktaş J.K.	Kocaeli Bayan FK	6–0	13 February 2022	
(Trinidad and Tobago) Kennya Cordner	4	Fenerbahçe S.K.	Kdz. Ereğlispor	6–1	13 February 2022	
(Mali) Saratou Traoré	4	Fatih Karagümrük	Kayseri Kadın FK	8–1	13 February 2022	
(Turkey) Ebru Dolu	3	Amed S.K.	Kocaeli Bayan FK	5–2	19 February 2022	
(Democratic Republic of the Congo) Exaucée Kizinga	3	Ataşehir Belediyespor	Kocaeli Bayan FK	4–1	27 February 2022	
(Tunisia) Mariem Houij	5	ALG Spor	İlkadım Belediye YabPa Spor	11–0	5 March 2022	
(Northern Cyprus) Müzeyyen Dilek Özbiler	3	Adana İdman Yurdu	Kayseri Kadın FK	10–0	5 March 2022	
(Turkey) Zeynep Gamze Koçer	3	Beşiktaş J.K.	Ataşehir Belediyespor	6–3	5 March 2022	
(Trinidad and Tobago) Kennya Cordner	3	Fenerbahçe S.K.	Ataşehir Belediyespor	4–0	9 March 2022	
(Democratic Republic of the Congo) Monique Rith	3	ALG Spor	Dudullu Spor	7–0	9 March 2022	
(Turkey) Arzu Karabulut	3	Beşiktaş J.K.	Kireçburnu Spor	6–0	27 March 2022	
(Kenya) Mwanalima Adam	3	Hakkarigücü Spor	Dudullu Spor	6–0	2 April 2022	
(Ghana) Gifty Assifuah	3	1207 Antalyaspor	Kocaeli Bayan FK	7–1	2 April 2022	
(Ukraine) Nadiia Khavanska	3	Ataşehir Belediyespor	Kireçburnu Spor	5–1	2 April 2022	
(Jordan) Maysa Jbarah	3	Fomget G.S.	Altay S.K.	10–0	2 April 2022	
(Ukraine) Tetyana Kozyrenko	3	1207 Antalyaspor	Beşiktaş J.K.	3–2	17 April 2022	
(England) Shameeka Fishley	3	Fenerbahçe S.K.	Hatayspor	6–0	17 April 2022	
(Ukraine) Olha Ovdiychuk	3	Fomget G.S.	Kocaeli Bayan FK	13–0	17 April 2022	
(Trinidad and Tobago) Kennya Cordner	4	Fenerbahçe S.K.	Altay S.K.	11–0	24 April 2022	
(Mali) Saratou Traoré	3	Fatih Karagümrük	İlkadım Belediye YabPa Spor	5–1	24 April 2022	
(England) Shameeka Fishley	3	Fenerbahçe S.K.	Kireçburnu Spor	10–1	30 April 2022	
(Turkey) Arzu Karabulut	4	Beşiktaş J.K.	Kocaeli Bayan FK	10–0	8 May 2022	
(Turkey) Yağmur Uraz	3	Beşiktaş J.K.	Kocaeli Bayan FK	10–0	8 May 2022	
(Turkey) Figen Açar	3	Sivasspor	Kireçburnu Spor	5–6	22 May 2022	

== Gallery ==
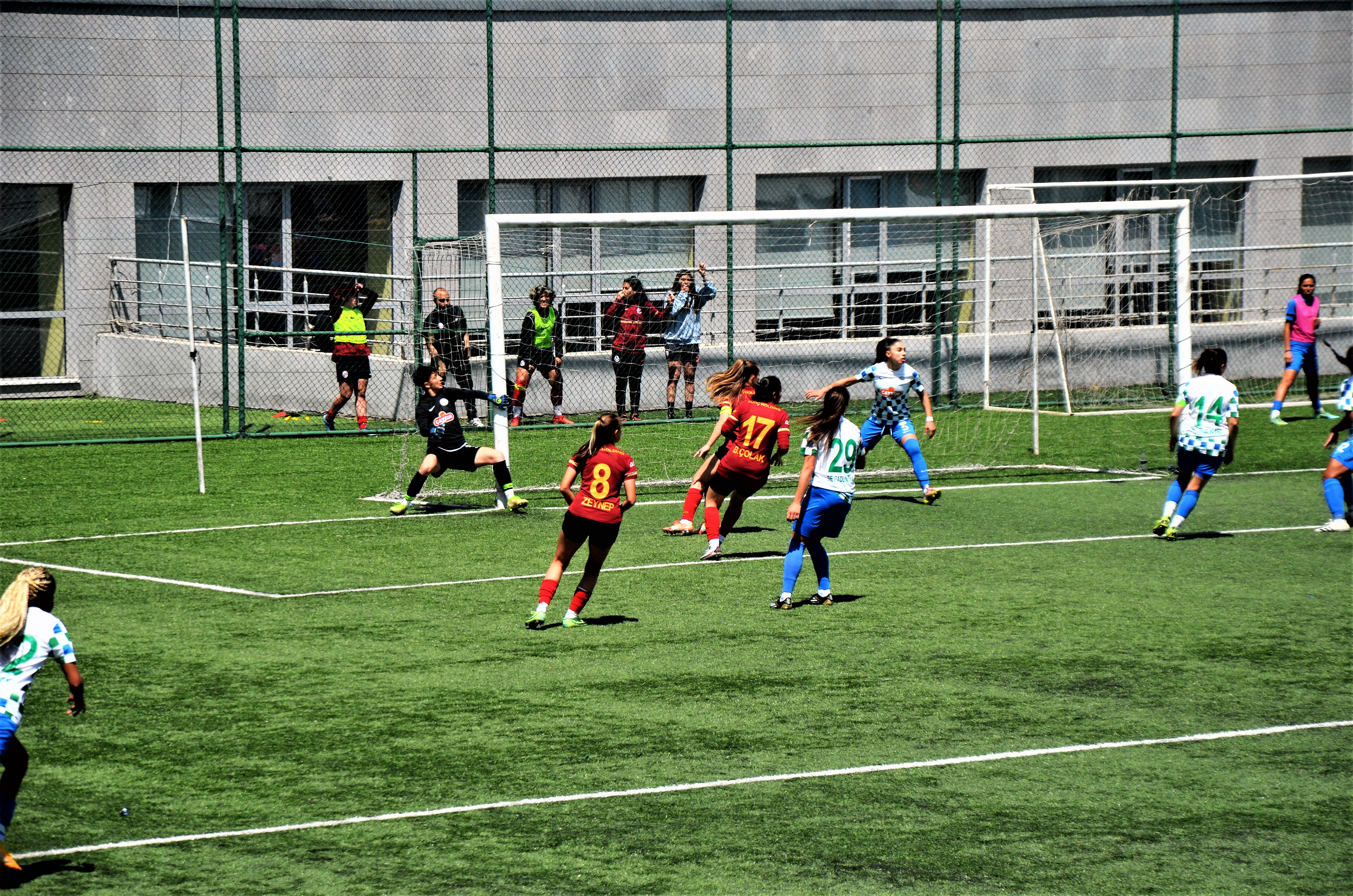
Galatasaray (red/yellow) vs Çaykur Rizespor (white/blue) in the 2021-22 Turkish Women's Football Super League.

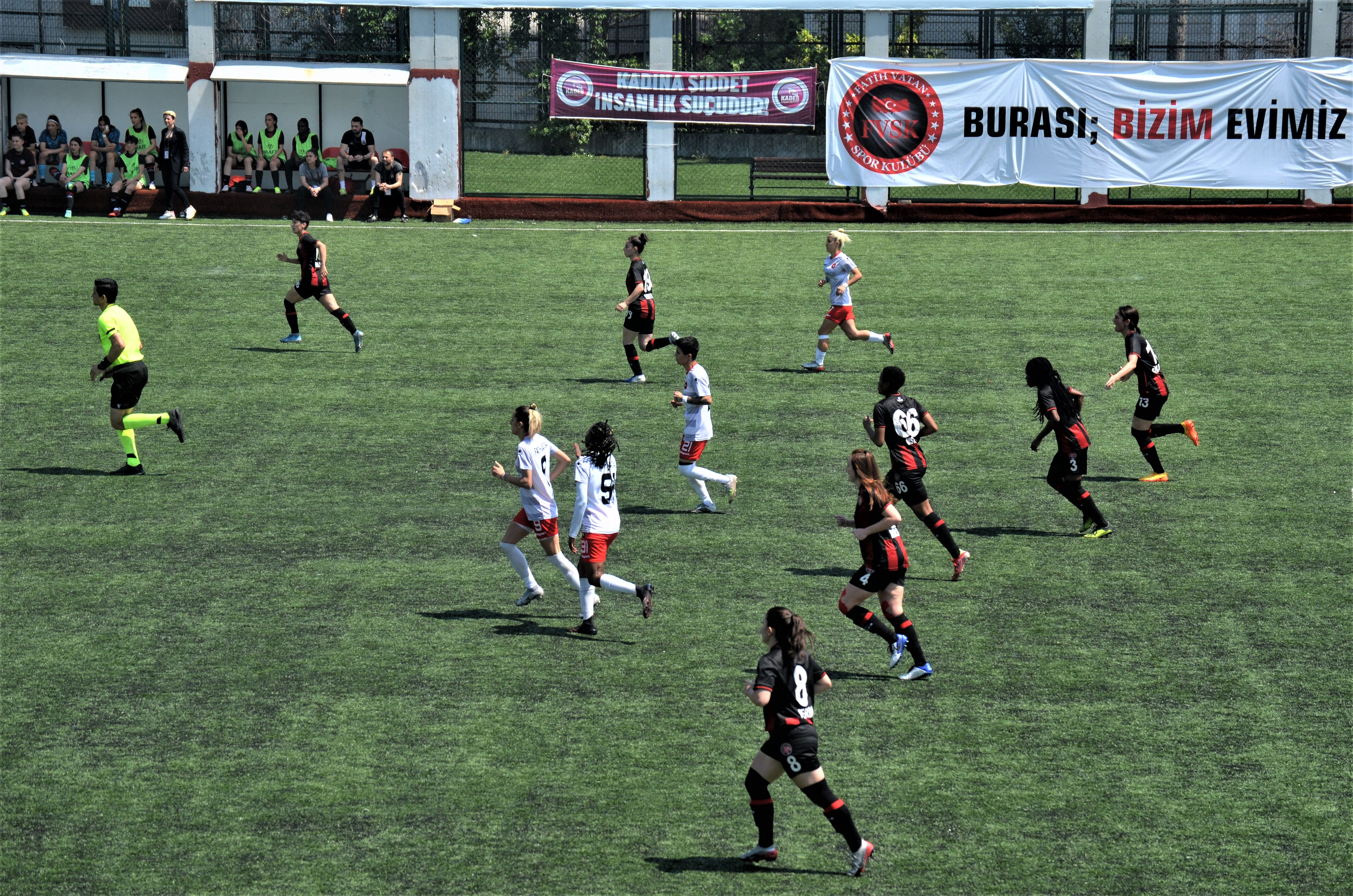
Fatih Vatan Spor (white/red) vs Fatih Karagümrük (black/red) in the first leg of 2021-22Women's Super League play-offs.

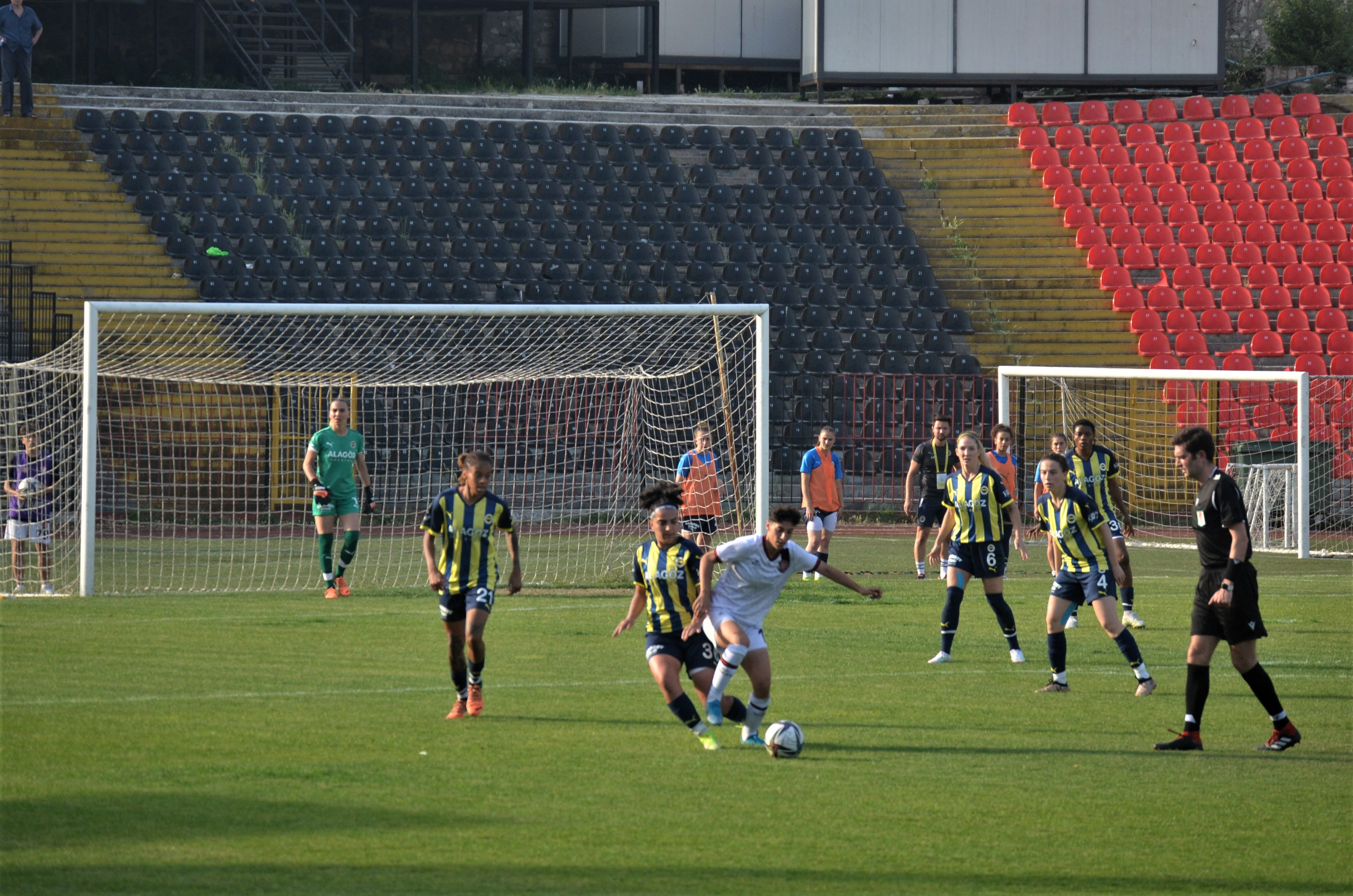
Fatih Karagümrük (white) in the home match against Fenerbahçe (navy/yellow) of the 2021-22 Turkish Women's Football Super League play-offs.
