= List of foreign women's football players in Turkey =

This is a list of foreign women's footballers, who have played or still play in the Turkish Women's Super League (2021– ) or the Women's First League (2008–2021, 2022– ).

Article 18 of the Turkish Football Federation (TFF)'s status for the women's football leagues covers the regulations for the expatriate women footballers, who can be registered by clubs of the Women's First League. The maximum number of expatriate players of a club in one league season was set as five. With the Article 20 of the TFF status for the 2021–22 Women's Super League season, the maximum number of expatriate women's footballers was increased from five to six. Domestic transfer of registered expatriate players from one club to another may take place only during the transfer window, and if the receiving club's quota allows it. License, visa and transfer procedures of expatriate football players are valid only within the player's residence permit period. Up to six expatriate players may appear in the squad namelist, and may play in the same competition. The maximum number of six expatriate players will apply also in the 2022–23 season, will decrease to maximum five from the 2023–24 season on including. The TFF issues a certificate of conformity for the purpose of expatriate player's residence permit application to the Immigration Admikolinastration. License for the expatriate player is issued by the TFF in relation with the club following the arrival of the International Transfer Certificate (IFC). Naturalized expatriate footballers can play as Turkish footballers only after three years from the date of related first application. Contract of expatriate players terminate when their team relegates to the Women's Second League, at which no expatriate players are allowed. In this case, those players can be transferred by another Women's Super League club in the next season. A license fee for the expatriate player has to be deposited by the club at the TFF.

As of the 2022–23 Women's Super League and First League season:

As of February 2023

St.	Nationality	Player	Birth date and age	Pos.	Play time	Ref.						
F	AFG	Farkhunda Muhtaj	15 November 1997 (age 29)	MF	2022							
C	ALB	Mesuare Begallo	1 March 2000 (age 26)		2025–							
F	ALB	Megi Doci	14 October 1996 (age 30)	FW	2024							
C	ALB	Ezmiralda Franja	4 February 1997 (age 29)	DF	2025–							
F	ALB	Vanesa Levenaj	10 August 2001 (age 25)	MF	2025–2026							
C	ALB	Sara Maliqi	9 October 1995 (age 31)	DF	2025–							
C	ALB	Valentina Troka	15 November 2002 (age 24)	DF	2024–							
C	ALB	Armela Tukaj	25 May 2001 (age 25)	FW	2024–							
C	ALB	Ilarja Zarka	1 October 2001 (age 25)	MF	2025–							
F	ALG	Wassila Alouache	11 July 2000 (age 26)	DF	2025–2026							
F	ALG	Ouafaa Hamri	15 June 2006 (age 20)	MF	2025–2026							
F	ALG	Naima Lamari	22 September 1997 (age 29)	MF	2025–2026							
C	ALG	Amira Ould Braham	17 February 1998 (age 28)	MF	2025–							
F	ANG	Patricia Seteco	26 September 1992 (age 34)		2023–2026							
F	ARG	Yuliana Sanabria	26 January 2002 (age 24)	FW	2024							
F	ARM	Armine Khachatryan	16 September 1986 (age 40)	DF	2019							
C	AUS	Shivani Battaglia	2 February 2004 (age 22)	GK	2026–							
F	AUT	Andrea Gurtner	1 February 2001 (age 25)	DF	2024–2026							
C	AZE	Yeliz Açar	19 December 1997 (age 28)	FW	2021–							
C	AZE	Ayshan Ahmadova	5 May 2000 (age 26)	DF	2021–							
F	AZE	Aysun Aliyeva	5 May 2000 (age 26)	DF	2016–2023							
F	AZE	Joshguna Aliyeva	22 March 2002 (age 24)	MF	2022–2023							
F	AZE	Nargiz Aliyeva	22 March 2002 (age 24)	GK	2021–2026							
F	AZE	Lamia Alizada	16 January 2003 (age 23)	MF	2021–2022							
C	AZE	Samira Ashirova	13 March 2004 (age 22)	DF	2026–							
F	AZE	Beyzanur Aslan	28 September 2001 (age 25)	DF	2017–2022							
C	AZE	Kristina Bakarandze	19 May 1998 (age 28)	MF	2018–							
C	AZE	Peritan Bozdağ	15 June 1999 (age 27)	FW	2017–							
C	AZE	Pınar Çeri	10 January 2001 (age 25)	DF	2021–							
F	AZE	Gulanbar Gasimova	31 May 1997 (age 29)	DF	2021–2022							
C	AZE	Şeyma Nur Gencay	8 March 2005 (age 21)	DF	2021–							
C	AZE	Mislina Gözükara	20 December 1997 (age 28)	FW	2012–							
F	AZE	Nargiz Hajiyeva	12 April 1991 (age 35)	MF	2019–2024							
F	AZE	Vusala Hajiyeva	3 October 1999 (age 27)	MF	2021–2024							
F	AZE	Gunay İsmayilova	8 March 1998 (age 28)	GK	2017–2018							
F|Fidan	AZE	Fidan Jafarova	24 October 2004 (age 22)	DF	2025–2026							
C	AZE	Sevinj Jafarzade	1 June 1994 (age 32)	MF	2025–							
C	AZE	Bilge Su Koyun	3 July 1999 (age 27)	MF	2021–							
F	AZE	Zhala Mahsimova	2 September 1996 (age 30)	MF	2021–2025							
F	AZE	Kamilla Mammadova	31 August 1996 (age 30)	DF	2017, 2021–2024							
C	AZE	Esra Manya	11 April 1999 (age 27)	FW	2020–							
C	AZE	Aysun Muradova	18 November 2003 (age 23)	MF	2021–							
C	AZE	Alina Nahmadova	3 November 2003 (age 23)	DF	2021–							
C	AZE	Nazlıcan Parlak	27 May 1993 (age 33)	MF	2010–2020, 2021–							
F	AZE	Milana Rahimova	29 April 2004 (age 22)	DF	2024–2025							
F	AZE	Sona Rahimova	14 July 2001 (age 25)	MF	2021–2022							
F	AZE	Rovshana Sardarlı	22 June 2000 (age 26)	FW	2021							
F	AZE	Vusala Seyfatdinova	11 March 2000 (age 26)	MF	2020–2024							
F	AZE	Aytaj Sharifova	8 January 1997 (age 29)	GK	2019–2022							
C	AZE	Gülsüm Tunç	26 September 1995 (age 31)	GK	2021–							
F	BAR	Rianna Chylese Cyrus	29 November 1999 (age 26)		2024–2026							
F	BEL	Zoë Van Eynde	29 September 1999 (age 27)	DF	2024–2026							
C	BEN	Yolande Gnammi	1 January 2000 (age 26)	FW	2024–2026–	https://www.tff.org/Default.aspx?pageId=30&kisiId=2936207]						
F	BFA	Juliette Nana	16 August 2000 (age 26)	MF	2022–2026							
C	BFA	Madinatou Rouamba	1 December 2001 (age 24)	DF	2022–							
C	BFA	Balkissa Sawadogo	2 October 1998 (age 28)	FW	2023–							
C	BFA	Rasmata Sawadogo	1 January 2001 (age 25)	MF	2024–							
C	BIH	Marija Aleksić	11 August 1997 (age 29)	DF	2023–							
C	BIH	Vina Crnoja	8 March 2000 (age 26)	FW	2026–							
F	BIH	Iman Dumanjić	16 January 2005 (age 21)	GK	2023–2026							
F	BIH	Minela Gačanica	9 March 2000 (age 26)	FW	2024–2025							
F	BIH	Aida Hadžić	11 September 1992 (age 34)	MF	2023–2025							
F	BIH	Almina Hodžić	2 November 1988 (age 38)	GK	2023–2024							
C	BIH	Alma Krajnić	11 December 2002 (age 23)	FW	2025–							
F	BIH	Ena Šabanagić	27 October 1997 (age 29)	MF	2023–2025							
F	BIH	Dajana Spasojević	29 October 1997 (age 29)	FW	2022							
F	BLR	Yuliya Duben	25 November 1996 (age 29)	FW	2022–2023							
F	BLR	Palina Hirchyts	29 March 2001 (age 25)	MF	2023–2024							
C	BLR	Liubou Hudchanka	5 March 1992 (age 34)		2023–							
C	BLR	Anastasiya Kunitskaya	22 January 1989 (age 37)	DF	2019, 2022–							
F	BLR	Alesia Lynko	22 November 1997 (age 28)	DF	2019, 2020–2022							
F	BLR	Ekaterina Miklashevich	25 January 1992 (age 34)	GK	2024–2025							
C	BLR	Karina Olkhovik	17 June 2000 (age 26)	FW	2023–							
F	BLR	Anastasiya Sidarchuk	19 January 2001 (age 25)	MF	2022							
C	BOT	Keitumetse Dithebe	17 July 2002 (age 24)	MF	2025–							
F	BOT	Lone Gaofetoge	16 July 2001 (age 25)	DF	2024–2025							
C	BRA	Maria Alves	7 July 1993 (age 33)	FW	2024–							
C	BRA	Marcella Souza Bezerra	28 December 1986 (age 39)		2023–							
C	BRA	Silvana de Jesus Bispo	18 February 1998 (age 28)	DF	2024–							
C	BRA	Marta Cintra	27 April 2000 (age 26)	FW	2024–							
C	BRA	Emilly da Silva Scaramelo	13 March 2002 (age 24)	FW	2025–							
C	BRA	Milena Costa de Melo	14 March 1997 (age 29)		2023–							
C	BRA	Bia Nicoleti	27 May 2002 (age 24)	GK	2023–							
C	BRA	Mayllene Correa de Oliveira	25 February 1998 (age 28)	MF	2023–							
C	BRA	Franciane de Jesus Gomes Mendes	9 August 2001 (age 25)		2023–							
F	BRA	Mariana Santos	24 February 1998 (age 28)	FW	2021–2022							
F	BRA	Camila Santos	22 September 2000 (age 26)	DF	2023–2026							
C	BRA	Rhaizza Cabral	29 October 1998 (age 28)	FW	2022–							
C	BRA	Giovânia Domingas Campos	31 October 1985 (age 41)	FW	2022–							
C	BRA	Kim Campos	22 March 2000 (age 26)	FW	2023–							
C	BRA	Karoline Cardozo	8 October 2000 (age 26)	FW	2023–							
C	BRA	Gabrielle Da Silva Santos	16 March 1995 (age 31)	FW	2025–							
C	BRA	Amanda Ferreira	4 May 1989 (age 37)	DF	2021–							
C	BRA	Thuany Gomes Ferreira Xavier	9 June 1994 (age 32)	FW	2023–							
F	BRA	Stefany Ferrer van Ginkel	17 October 1998 (age 28)	MF	2022–2*25							
F	BRA	Thays Ferrer	31 October 1999 (age 27)	FW	2022							
F	BRA	Franceline Baldez Fleitas	18 October 1998 (age 28)		2023–							
F	BRA	Tatiana Rosario Muniz	17 August 1984 (age 42)		2010–2011, 2023							
F	BRA	Isabelle Caroline e Silva do Nascimento	11 July 1998 (age 28)		2022							
F	BRA	Giovanna dos Santos Nascimento	22 April 1997 (age 29)	DF	2021–2022							
F	BRA	Jaqueline Gonçalves Nogueira	7 October 1985 (age 41)		2010–2011							
C	BRA	Sara Piveta	24 January 2000 (age 26)	MF	2024–							
C	BRA	Lidiane Lopes Ribeiro	7 May 1998 (age 28)	FW	2022–							
C	BRA	Miriele Luan Rosa	19 June 2000 (age 26)	MF	2022–							
F	BRA	Maria Caroline Manoel Shimoguiri	27 March 1999 (age 27)	DF	2022							
F	BRA	Ana Paula	16 February 1997 (age 29)	FW	2022–2023							
C	BRA	Rafaela Sudré	9 December 1993 (age 32)	FW	2024–							
F	BUL	Nadezhda Ivanova	17 December 2004 (age 21)	FW	2024							
F	CAN	Daphnée Blouin	18 April 1998 (age 28)	FW	2024							
C	CAN	Jessika Maryanne Emmerton	16 December 2002 (age 23)	FW	2025–							
F	CAN	Kathryn Harvey	9 June 1997 (age 29)	FW	2024							
F	CAN	Sofia Iaderosa	3 October 2003 (age 23)	FW	2023							
F	CAN	Kalin O'Brien	28 August 2000 (age 26)	DF	2024							
F	CAN	Elis Nemtsov	14 January 2002 (age 24)	FW	2024–2025							
F	CAN	Christabel Oduro	1 November 1992 (age 34)	MF	2022–2025							
F	CAN	Holly O'Neill	19 September 1998 (age 28)	FW	2024							
F	CAN	Madelyn Robbins	17 April 2000 (age 26)	MF	2024							
F	CAN	Danielle Steer	29 April 1999 (age 27)	FW	2023							
F	CGO	Adama Smith Dickens	28 December 1992 (age 33)	MF	2016							
F	CHN	Li Jiayue	8 June 1990 (age 36)	DF	2023							
F	CIV	Rita Akaffou	5 December 1986 (age 39)	MF	2021–2024							
C	CIV	Melissa Sandrine Behinan	25 May 2003 (age 23)	MF	2025–							
C	CIV	Grace Bleu	21 December 2002 (age 23)	FW	2026–							
C	CIV	Gemima Bouazo	20 November 2006 (age 19)	FW	2026–							
F	CIV	Nadège Cissé	4 April 1997 (age 29)	FW	2025–2026							
F	CIV	Marie Dieudonne Doudjon	7 July 1994 (age 32)	MF	2023–2024							
F	CIV	Cecile Esmei Amari	20 November 1991 (age 34)	MF	2019–2020							
F	CIV	Aramatou Diakité	23 July 2001 (age 25)	GK	2023–2026							
F	CIV	Mariam Diakité	11 April 1995 (age 31)	DF	2025–2026							
C	CIV	Aminata Haidara	13 May 1997 (age 29)	MF	2022–							
F	CIV	Fanta Zara Kamaté	25 October 1995 (age 31)	FW	2018–2019							
F	CIV	Nina Kpaho	30 December 1996 (age 29)	DF	2021–2026							
F	CIV	Michaela Koutouan	19 October 1990 (age 36)	DF	2018–2019							
F	CIV	Ines Nrehy	1 October 1993 (age 33)	FW	2017							
F	CMR	Jacquette Ada	27 August 1991 (age 35)	FW	2015–2019, 2021–2022							
C	CMR	Henriette Akaba	7 June 1992 (age 34)	FW	2015–2018, 2023–							
F	CMR	Paulline Charlotte Alang Ayangma	9 August 1992 (age 34)	GK	2022–2026							
F	CMR	Berthe Andiolo	15 April 1992 (age 34)	FW	2021–2024							
F	CMR	Rose Bella	5 May 1994 (age 32)	FW	2021–2025							
C	CMR	Vanessa Djomo	25 December 1998 (age 27)	MF	2021–							
C	CMR	Augustine Ejangue	19 January 1989 (age 37)	DF	2022–							
C	CMR	Alexandra Takounda Engolo	7 July 2000 (age 26)	FW	2024–							
C	CMR	Tatiana Ewodo	9 February 1997 (age 29)	FW	2025–							
C	CMR	Fatima Komé	22 July 2004 (age 22)	MF	2024–							
F	CMR	Marie Laure Kong	30 May 1998 (age 28)	DF	2021–2026							
F	CMR	Raissa Feudjio	29 October 1995 (age 31)	MF	2013–2014							
F	CMR	Tchadeu Guylaine	2 March 1998 (age 28)		2024–2026							
C	CMR	Mariane Maague	11 June 2004 (age 22)	DF	2026–							
F	CMR	Genevieve Ngo Mbeleck	10 March 1993 (age 33)	MF	2025–2026							
C	CMR	Judith Menguene	17 March 2006 (age 20)	DF	2026–							
F	CMR	Tim Shalom Nakoma Ngam	7 August 2001 (age 25)		2024–2025							
C	CMR	Annecy Candide Nguiadem Kamdem	4 April 1994 (age 32)	DF	2023–							
C	CMR	Marie Gisele Divine Ngah Manga	20 October 2002 (age 24)	FW	2023–							
C	CMR	Suzie Mbiandji	14 May 2005 (age 21)	FW	2025–							
F	CMR	Bibi Medoua	13 May 2002 (age 24)	MF	2013–2014							
C	CMR	Julie Nina Nke Nke	13 May 2002 (age 24)		2023–							
F	CMR	Brigitte Omboudou	29 July 1992 (age 34)	MF	2024							
C	CMR	Kevine Ossol	19 August 2000 (age 26)	FW	2025–							
C	CMR	Viviane Mefire Peka	19 December 2001 (age 24)	MF	2021–							
C	CMR	Aimée Horliane Tchuenguia	25 February 1994 (age 32)	DF	2023–							
F	CMR	Sorelle Tagne Hornella Metiefang	7 May 1999 (age 27)		2023–2024							
F	CMR	Carine Yoh	10 April 1993 (age 33)	MF	2016							
F	CMR	Doly Djane Wabeua Djiatio	9 June 2003 (age 23)	FW	2021–2022							
F	CMR	Moussa Zouwairatou	12 June 2001 (age 25)	MF	2022–2023							
C	COD	Isabelle Diakiese Kaluzodi	12 December 1992 (age 33)	FW	2025–							
F	COD	Naomie Kabakaba	4 April 1998 (age 28)	DF	2023–2024							
F	COD	Marlène Kasaj	25 January 1996 (age 30)	FW	2021–2024							
F	COD	Ruth Kipoyi	15 October 1997 (age 29)	FW	2021–2024							
F	COD	Exaucée Kizinga	31 January 2004 (age 22)	MF	2022							
F	COD	Bénie Kubiena	7 May 1999 (age 27)	MF	2023–2024							
C	COD	Francesca Lueya	27 July 1999 (age 27)	MF	2026–	https://www.tff.org/Default.aspx?pageId=30&kisiId=2938796]						
F	COD	Grâce Mfwamba Balongo	20 December 1997 (age 28)	FW	2021–2024							
F	COD	Flavine Mawete	11 December 2000 (age 25)	MF	2021–2022							
F	COD	Fideline Ngoy	31 March 1991 (age 35)	GK	2022–2024							
F	COD	Deborah Ngalula	25 May 2002 (age 24)	FW	2021–2022							
C	COD	Falonne Pambani	2 August 1994 (age 32)	FW	2023–							
F	COD	Dorcas Vangu Masanga	12 January 1999 (age 27)	MF	2023–							
C	COD	Rutha Tokasi	7 January 2004 (age 22)		2024–							
F	COD	Olga Tshilombo	24 April 2002 (age 24)	FW	2023							
C	COD	Sarah Yasongamo	15 August 1998 (age 28)	MF	2024–							
C	COL	Natalia Acuña	25 September 1998 (age 28)	MF	2023–							
F	COL	Lady Andrade	10 January 1992 (age 34)	MF	2016–2017							
F	COL	Carolina Arias	2 September 1990 (age 36)	DF	2016–2017							
C	COL	Farlyn Fernanda Caicedo Quiñónez	19 February 1998 (age 28)	FW	2023–							
C	COL	Nicol Camacho	29 October 1999 (age 27)	MF	2022–							
C	COL	Iranis Esther Centeno Rodríguez	1 June 2003 (age 23)	FW	2023–							
C	COL	Lina Martínez	25 August 1993 (age 33)	FW	2022–							
C	COL	Kendy Morales	13 July 1999 (age 27)	FW	2022–							
F	COL	Karol Alejandra Murcia Salamanca	17 December 2001 (age 24)	MF	2023–2026							
C	COL	Viverly Mayurinyerfith Erazo Ñañez	31 July 1992 (age 34)	MF	2024–							
C	COL	Julieth Ribero	26 June 2003 (age 23)	GK	2022–							
C	COL	Yessica Tatiana Rodríguez Angulo	28 November 1995 (age 30)	FW	2023–							
F	COL	Angie Téllez	21 August 1994 (age 32)		2021–2022							
C	COL	Catalina Usme	25 December 1989 (age 36)	FW	2024–							
F	COL	Oriánica Velásquez	1 August 1989 (age 37)	DF	2016–2017							
C	CRC	María Paula Salas	12 July 2002 (age 24)	FW	2025–							
C	CRO	Antonia Dulčić	4 February 1997 (age 29)	DF	2023–							
C	CRO	Petra Pezelj	28 October 1998 (age 28)	MF	2023–							
C	CTA	Christelle Demba	26 February 1998 (age 28)	MF	2022–							
C	CTA	M'pemba Felicite Makaya	28 April 2000 (age 26)	FW	2022–	,						
C	CYP	Antri Violari	27 September 1996 (age 30)	FW	2023–							
C	CZE	Andrea Stašková	12 May 2000 (age 26)	FW	2024–							
F	EGY	Samia Adam	19 April 1996 (age 30)	MF	2021–2022							
F	EGY	Salwa Elmitwalli	15 May 1990 (age 36)		2018							
F	EGY	Sara Mohamed	6 July 1990 (age 36)	DF	2017–2018							
F	EGY	Engy El-Sayed	4 September 1986 (age 40)	FW	2017–2018							
F	EGY	Maha Shehata	13 February 1989 (age 37)	GK	2017–2018							
F	EGY	Noha Tarek	1 March 1999 (age 27)	FW	2018–2019							
C	ENG	Shameeka Fishley	19 September 1993 (age 33)	FW	2021–2022, 2024–							
C	ENG	Anele Komani	23 December 1998 (age 27)	MF	2023–							
F	ESA	Samaria Gómez	18 February 2002 (age 24)	FW	2025–2026							
C	ESP	Laura Domínguez	12 August 1997 (age 29)	FW	2025–							
C	ESP	Saira Posada	21 January 1998 (age 28)	FW	2024–							
C	ESP	Mariasun Quiñones	29 October 1996 (age 30)	GK	2025–							
C	FIN	Sini Laaksonen	5 March 1996 (age 30)	MF	2024–							
C	GAB	Reine Edzoumou	1 February 1996 (age 30)	FW	2021–2022, 2023–							
F	GAB	Erica Moulatsa	2 February 1998 (age 28)	DF	2021–2022							
C	GAB	Aristelle Luise Yog-Atouth	20 April 1994 (age 32)	MF	2023–							
C	GAM	Manyima Stevelmans	31 October 2000 (age 26)	MF	2023–							
F	GEO	Teona Bakradze	24 January 1996 (age 30)	FW	2016–2024							
C	GEO	Maiko Bebia	20 May 2003 (age 23)	MF	2024–							
F	GEO	Anastasia Bolkvadze	6 November 2002 (age 24)	MF	2021–2022							
C	GEO	Ana Cheminava	1 February 1996 (age 30)	FW	2021–2022, 2023–							
F	GEO	Nino Chkhartishvili	25 January 1999 (age 27)	DF	2022–2022							
F	GEO	Lela Chichinadze	22 December 1988 (age 37)	FW	2014–2018							
F	GEO	Nino Chkuaseli	22 September 1988 (age 38)	GK	2010–2013							
F	GEO	Mariam Danelia	6 May 1997 (age 29)	MF	2021–2022							
F	GEO	Megi Ejibia	7 July 2002 (age 24)	MF	2021–2022							
F	GEO	Svetlana Gabelaia	19 April 2002 (age 24)	GK	2021–2022							
F	GEO	Tatia Gabunia	7 July 2000 (age 26)	GK	2023							
C	GEO	Mariami Janikashvili	5 June 2000 (age 26)	FW	021–2022, 2024–	,						
F	GEO	Ana Kirvalidze	31 October 2000 (age 26)	FW	2021–2022							
C	GEO	Tatiana Matveeva	25 July 1990 (age 36)	MF	2008–2015, 2017, 2022–							
F	GEO	Kristina Shadoba	1 January 1987 (age 39)	GK	2008–2011							
C	GEO	Natela Tsotseria	30 May 2002 (age 24)	FW	2022–							
F	GEO	Teona Sukhashvili	6 February 1994 (age 32)	GK	2016–2022							
F	GEO	Nino Sutidze	17 March 1992 (age 34)	DF	2011–2018							
C	GEO	Tamari Tatuashvili	12 April 1991 (age 35)	DF	2011–							
F	GEO	Khatia Tchkonia	16 October 1989 (age 37)	FW	2009–2019							
F	GEO	Teona Todadze	3 March 1993 (age 33)	MF	2012–2016							
C	GER	Paula Ruess	24 October 1999 (age 27)	MF	2025–							
C	GHA	Philomena Abakah	1 November 2002 (age 24)	FW	2026–							
C	GHA	Ernestina Abambila	30 December 1998 (age 27)	MF	2023–							
C	GHA	Mukarama Abdulai	10 October 2002 (age 24)	FW	2026–	-	C	GHA	Elshaddai Acheampong	16 August 2003 (age 23)	FW	2024–
F	GHA	Gifty Acheampong	5 November 1999 (age 27)	MF	2017–2018							
C	GHA	Anasthesia Achiaa	20 December 2003 (age 22)	DF	2023–							
C	GHA	Linda Addai	12 December 1995 (age 30)	DF	2023–							
F	GHA	Elizabeth Addo	1 September 1993 (age 33)	FW	2022							
C	GHA	Bridget Adu	2 September 1999 (age 27)		2021–							
C	GHA	Princella Adubea	27 December 1998 (age 27)	FW	2024–							
F	GHA	Juanita Aguadze	15 May 2003 (age 23)	FW	2025–2026							
F	GHA	Alberto Yawo Ahialey	2 April 1997 (age 29)	FW	2022							
F	GHA	Abigail Antwi	4 June 2003 (age 23)		2023–2024							
C	GHA	Victoria Agyei	15 May 1996 (age 30)	GK	2021–							
C	GHA	Regina Antwi	26 November 1995 (age 30)	DF	2021–							
C	GHA	Queenabel Akosua Amankrah	30 May 2002 (age 24)	MF	2021–							
C	GHA	Georgina Aoyem	24 May 2005 (age 21)	FW	2025–							
C	GHA	Catherine Arthur	13 June 1999 (age 27)		2023–							
C	GHA	Doris Asiamah	3 January 2002 (age 24)	MF	2021–							
C	GHA	Olivia Asiamah	12 October 2005 (age 21)	GK	2026–							
C	GHA	Gifty Assifuah	23 July 2000 (age 26)	FW	2021–							
C	GHA	Rose Baah	15 August 1999 (age 27)	GK	2025–							
C	GHA	Azumah Bugre	15 December 2002 (age 23)	MF	2025–							
C	GHA	Ellen Coleman	11 December 1995 (age 30)	DF	2025–							
C	GHA	Rita Doku	26 September 2006 (age 20)	DF	2026–							
F	GHA	Priscilla Hagan	8 April 1996 (age 30)	FW	2019							
C	GHA	Ramaha Jafaru	17 March 2002 (age 24)	MF	2025–							
C	GHA	Abi Kim	19 July 1998 (age 28)	FW	2024–							
C	GHA	Faustina Kyeremeh	11 May 1999 (age 27)	MF	2023, 2025–							
C	GHA	Jennifer Mensah Adjei	4 June 2004 (age 22)	FW	2024–							
C	GHA	Fuseina Mumuni	2 April 2001 (age 25)	FW	2023–							
C	GHA	Rabi Musah	3 July 2001 (age 25)	DF	2023–							
C	GHA	Afia Nyarko	14 December 2004 (age 21)	MF	2023–							
C	GHA	Helena Obeng	13 October 1998 (age 28)		2026–							
F	GHA	Sonia Opoku	25 December 2001 (age 24)	MF	2022							
C	GHA	Elizabeth Oppong	15 May 2003 (age 23)	DF	2025–							
C	GHA	Sandra Owusu Ansah	29 January 2000 (age 26)	FW	2024–							
C	GHA	Priscilla Okyere	6 June 1995 (age 31)	MF	2022–							
C	GHA	Princess Owusu	15 May 2005 (age 21)	FW	2023–							
C	GHA	Elizabeth Owusuaa	3 August 2001 (age 25)	FW	2024–							
C	GHA	Faustina Owusu Nyamekye	29 December 2000 (age 25)	GK	2023–							
F	GHA	Patience Peterson-Kundok	29 September 2001 (age 25)	MF	2022–2025							
C	GHA	Candida Quarshie	8 July 2000 (age 26)		2025–							
C	GHA	Abigail Sakyiwaa	3 April 2004 (age 22)	FW	2025–							
C	GHA	Suzzy Teye	6 November 2002 (age 24)	MF	2022–							
F	GHA	Fredrica Torkudzor	31 July 2004 (age 22)	FW	2024							
C	GHA	Faustina Worwornyo Akpo	23 January 2001 (age 25)	FW	2024–							
C	GRE	Maria Baska	2 November 2000 (age 26)	FW	2023–							
F	GRE	Ioanna Chamalidou	11 October 1996 (age 30)	MF	2020							
C	GUI	Fatoumata Baldé	7 March 1993 (age 33)	FW	2025–							
C	GUI	Bountou Sylla	30 January 2000 (age 26)	FW	2023–							
F	GUI	Mariama Barry	4 August 1993 (age 33)		2017–2018							
C	HAI	Roselord Borgella	1 April 1993 (age 33)	FW	2024–							
C	HAI	Valentina Ornis	22 August 2003 (age 23)	FW	2023–							
C	HAI	Betina Petit-Frère	1 August 2003 (age 23)	DF	2026–							
F	HUN	Sára Pusztai	15 November 2001 (age 25)	MF	2024							
F	IRN	Parisa Geravandi	14 July 2003 (age 23)	GK	2022							
F	IRN	Hananeh Aminghashghay	14 July 2003 (age 23)	FW	2022							
C	IRN	Faezeh Esfahanian	18 December 1998 (age 27)	MF	2021–2022, 2023–							
C	IRN	Fatemeh Ghasemi	14 February 2001 (age 25)	MF	2021–							
F	IRN	Samaneh Ghashieh	24 September 1994 (age 32)		2021–2022							
F	IRN	Mina Hashemi	13 July 1984 (age 42)	FW	2022							
F	IRN	Maryam Izadpanah	26 November 1999 (age 26)	MF	2021–2022							
F	IRN	Golnoosh Khosravi	12 March 2001 (age 25)	GK	2019–2020							
F	IRN	Samira Mohammadi Jareyhani	14 June 1992 (age 34)	GK	2021–2022							
F	IRN	Fatemeh Motevallitaher	25 April 1999 (age 27)		2021–2022							
F	IRN	Kimiya Noori	3 July 1998 (age 28)		2021–2022							
C	IRN	Parmis Sabet	7 April 2005 (age 21)		2022–							
F	IRN	Maryam Yektaei	19 June 1993 (age 33)	GK	2021–2025							
C	ISR	Marian Awad	29 October 1996 (age 30)	MF	2023–							
C	ITA	Asia Bragonzi	5 March 2001 (age 25)	FW	2025–							
F	JAM	Sacha-Gay Brown	19 January 1995 (age 31)	FW	2022							
C	JAM	Konya Plummer	2 August 1997 (age 29)	DF	2024–							
F	JOR	Enas Al-Jamaeen	11 November 2003 (age 23)	MF	2022							
F	JOR	Ayah Al-Majali	9 March 1992 (age 34)	DF	2021–2022							
C	JOR	Maysa Jbarah	20 September 1989 (age 37)	FW	2021–							
F	JOR	Malak Shannak	1 August 2008 (age 18)	GK	2022							
F	JOR	Mai Sweilem	25 September 1995 (age 31)	MF	2021–2022							
C	JPN	Chinatsu Kaio	8 June 2003 (age 23)	MF	2026–							
C	KAZ	Karina Beriko	21 July 2004 (age 22)	MF	2025–							
F	KAZ	Nazym Ismailova	24 February 2001 (age 25)	GK	2022							
C	KAZ	Shokhista Khojasheva	3 February 1995 (age 31)	DF	2018–							
F	KAZ	Angelina Portnova	10 February 2001 (age 25)	GK	2021–2025							
C	KAZ	Oksana Zheleznyak	13 March 1987 (age 39)	GK	2023–							
C	KAZ	Karina Zhumabaikyzy	4 August 1996 (age 30)	MF	2024–							
C	KEN	Lavin Achola	16 January 2003 (age 23)	DF	2026–							
C	KEN	Mwanalima Adam	4 September 1997 (age 29)	FW	2021–							
F	KEN	Esse Akida	18 November 1992 (age 34)	FW	2020							
F	KEN	Christine Nafula	10 November 1991 (age 35)	MF	2022							
C	KEN	Vivian Nasaka	19 December 1999 (age 26)	DF	2022–							
C	KEN	Phoeby Okech	10 October 1994 (age 32)	MF	2023–							
F	KEN	Jentrix Shikangwa	27 November 2001 (age 24)	FW	2022							
C	KEN	Cynthia Shilwatso	23 July 1999 (age 27)	FW	2024–							
C	KEN	Euphrasier Shilwatso	1 July 2003 (age 23)	DF	2026–							
C	KGZ	Baktygul Toktobolotova	5 July 2000 (age 26)	FW	2022–							
C	KOS	Kaltrina Biqkaj	5 August 2000 (age 26)	FW	2024–							
C	KOS	Donjeta Halilaj	12 March 2000 (age 26)	MF	2023–							
C	KOS	Florentina Kolgeci	30 October 2000 (age 26)	GK	2025–							
C	KOS	Shkurte Maliqi	28 September 1995 (age 31)	DF	2025–							
C	KOS	Lumbardha Misini	2 April 2003 (age 23)	MF	2024–							
C	KOS	Rrezona Ramadani	5 September 2002 (age 24)	DF	2026–							
C	KOS	Fatlinda Ramaj	30 September 2000 (age 26)	DF	2025–							
C	KOS	Blerta Smaili	8 May 2002 (age 24)	MF	2025–							
C	KOS	Marigone Tahiri	25 February 1999 (age 27)	MF	2025–							
C	LAT	Olga Ševcova	26 November 1992 (age 33)	FW	2023–							
C	LBN	Karly Harfouche	3 August 2004 (age 22)	DF	2026–							
C	MAR	Zoubida El Bastali	9 August 2002 (age 24)	DF	2023–							
F	MAR	Imane Abdelahad	21 July 1994 (age 32)	GK	2018							
F	MAR	Chirine Knaidil	19 July 1994 (age 32)	DF	2018							
C	MAR	Doha Ouahabi	20 May 2006 (age 20)	DF	2024–							
C	MDA	Natalia Munteanu	1 December 1993 (age 32)	GK	2024–							
C	MEX	Sofía Álvarez	5 June 2000 (age 26)	DF	2023–							
C	MEX	Nayeli Rangel	28 February 1992 (age 34)	MF	2025–							
C	MEX	Karla Zempoalteca	18 May 2000 (age 26)	DF	2025–							
C	MKD	Lenche Andreevska	13 August 1992 (age 34)	MF	2023–							
F	MKD	Eli Jakovska	16 May 1995 (age 31)	FW	2019							
C	MKD	Aleksandra Markovska	4 May 1997 (age 29)	MF	2026–							
C	MKD	Ulza Maksuti	8 July 1999 (age 27)	FW	2025–							
F	MLI	Bassira Touré	6 January 1990 (age 36)	FW	2021–2022							
C	MLI	Goundo Samake	2 May 1992 (age 34)	GK	2023–							
F	MLI	Aissata Traoré	9 September 1997 (age 29)	FW	2019							
C	MLI	Saratou Traoré	27 September 2002 (age 24)	MF	2021–							
C	MNE	Darija Đukić	11 January 1996 (age 30)	MF	2024–							
C	MNE	Jelena Karličić	5 October 2002 (age 24)	FW	2024–							
C	MNE	Armisa Kuč	11 April 1992 (age 34)	FW	2023–							
C	MNE	Slađana Bulatović	4 May 1994 (age 32)	FW	2023–							
F	NAM	Zenatha Coleman	25 September 1993 (age 33)	MF	2021–2025							
F	NCA	Yorcelly Humphreys	3 September 2001 (age 25)	MF	2022–2023							
C	(Northern Cyprus) NCY	Zehra Borazancı	16 September 1989 (age 37)	MF	2011–							
C	(Northern Cyprus) NCY	Müzeyyen Dilek Özbiler	25 September 1990 (age 36)	FW	2011–							
C	(Northern Cyprus) NCY	Cemre Kara	29 September 2001 (age 25)	DF	2021–							
F	NED	Anisah Karahan	26 February 2003 (age 23)		2022							
F	NED	Danielle Anna Maria Vos	23 January 2000 (age 26)		2017–2018							
F	NED	Corina Luijks	20 November 1995 (age 30)	FW	2022–2023							
C	NGA	Suliat Abideen	3 December 2001 (age 24)	MF	2024-							
C	NGA	[[Precious<Christopher {{{last}}}]]	14 August 2001 (age 25)	MF	2026-	https://www.tff.org/Default.aspx?pageId=30&kisiId=2935527]						
F	NGA	Opeyemi Dorcas Akanbi	24 June 2001 (age 25)		2025-2026							
C	NGA	Yetunde Ayantosho	7 November 2007 (age 19)		2026-							
C	NGA	Kafayat Bashiru	17 May 2005 (age 21)		2025-							
F	NGA	Ouwatosin Demehin	13 March 2002 (age 24)	DF	2024-2026							
C	NGA	Juliet Emereole	27 July 2005 (age 21)	DF	2025-							
F	NGA	Vivian Ikechukwu	10 July 1997 (age 29)		2023–2024							
F	NGA	Alice Ogebe	30 March 1995 (age 31)	FW	2023–2024							
F	NGA	Grace Nankyer Aaron	9 January 2001 (age 25)	GK	2023–2024							
F	NGA	Ramat Abdulkareem	23 September 1999 (age 27)	MF	2020–2022							
F	NGA	Cynthia Aku	31 December 1999 (age 26)	FW	2022–2024							
C	NGA	Ojo Ayomide	12 June 1995 (age 31)	{	2023–							
C	NGA	Joy Bokiri	29 December 1998 (age 27)	MF	2019–2020, 2023–							
F	NGA	Joy Duru	23 December 1999 (age 26)	DF	2023–2024							
F	NGA	Patricia George	18 December 1996 (age 29)	FW	2022							
C	NGA	Ogheneburme Osaretin Ikkhua	28 June 2001 (age 25)		2023–							
F	NGA	Taiwo Lawal	19 February 2004 (age 22)	FW	2023–2025							
F	NGA	Blessing Nkor	1 October 2003 (age 23)		2023–2026							
C	NGA	Anurika Happiness Nwaobia	10 June 2002 (age 24)		2024–							
F	NGA	Ogheneburme Osaretin Ikkhua	28 June 2001 (age 25)		2023–							
C	NGA	Ijeoma Queenth Daniels	25 September 1992 (age 34)	DF	2015–2018, 2020–							
F	NGA	Adebesi Adetoun Dosumu	1 December 1992 (age 33)		2022							
C	NGA	Glory Ogbonna	25 December 1998 (age 27)	DF	2022–							
F	NGA	Onome Ebi	8 May 1983 (age 43)	DF	2011–2013							
C	NGA	Judith Okah	29 June 2006 (age 20)	FW	2026–							
C	NGA	Blessing Kasarachi Okpe	1 October 2003 (age 23)	FW	2024–							
C	NGA	Chioma Olise	15 March 2005 (age 21)	MF	2025–							
C	NGA	Regina Otu	5 August 1996 (age 30)	MF	2024–							
F	NGA	Chidinma Favour Edeji	15 December 1995 (age 30)	MF	2018–2019							
F	NGA	Ugochi Emenayo	20 December 1997 (age 28)	DF	2021–2026							
F	NGA	Precious Emuobor	2 February 2003 (age 23)	MF	2021–2023							
F	NGA	Oluwasun Mary Fakunle	25 August 1996 (age 30)		2018							
F	NGA	Maryam Juke Ibrahim	12 December 1995 (age 30)	DF	2022–2024							
F	NGA	Ogoma Miracle Juseph	7 December 1999 (age 26)	DF	2024–2025							
F	NGA	Josephine Mathias	16 December 1999 (age 26)	MF	2018							
F	NGA	Maryan Ogochukwu Ohadiwe	25 December 2003 (age 22)	FW	2023–2024							
C	NGA	Mary Nunumwen Ologbosere	18 May 1999 (age 27)	DF	2024–							
F	NGA	Ujunwa Okafor	20 December 1992 (age 33)	DF	2018–2019							
C	NGA	Tochukwu Oluehi	2 May 1987 (age 39)	GK	2022–							
F	NGA	Desire Oparanozie	17 December 1993 (age 32)	FW	2014							
F	NGA	Gift Ele Otuwe	15 July 1984 (age 42)	MF	2017							
F	NGA	Amanda Mbadi	4 January 1999 (age 27)	MF	2022							
C	NGA	Mary Atinuke Saiki	8 April 2000 (age 26)	MF	2025–							
F	NGA	Flourish Sabastine	20 October 2004 (age 22)	FW	2024–2026							
C	NGA	Mary Abosede Salami	16 June 2003 (age 23)	MF	2024–							
C	NGA	Oladiti Bola Sofiyat	19 October 1999 (age 27)		2023–							
C	NGA	Kafayat Shittu	14 July 1997 (age 29)		2023–							
F	NGA	Esther Sunday	13 March 1992 (age 34)	MF	2016–2021							
F	NGA	Chikodinaka Maureen Umeugochukwu	27 October 2001 (age 25)		2021–2022							
C	NGA	Oluchi Janice Wachukwu	17 October 1997 (age 29)	FW	2022–							
F	NOR	Ina Kristoffersen	16 December 1999 (age 26)	DF	2025							
F	NZL	Margaret Ellen Jenkins	14 June 2001 (age 25)	FW	2024–2025							
F	PAK	Aqsa Mushtaq	15 August 1998 (age 28)	MF	2025–2026							
C	PAN	Marta Cox	20 July 1997 (age 29)	MF	2025–							
F	PAR	Rosa Miño	13 July 1999 (age 27)	MF	2022							
F	PAR	Yanina Servín	20 December 2003 (age 22)	MF	2024							
F	PER	Alesia García	13 January 2000 (age 26)	FW	2024							
F	PER	Katsumi Cheng Morales	19 September 1999 (age 27)	MF	2024–2026							
F	PHI	Jessika Cowart	30 October 1999 (age 27)	MF	2022							
F	PHI	Cathrine Graversen	25 April 1998 (age 28)	DF/MF	2024							
F	POL	Dżesika Jaszek	4 April 1996 (age 30)	FW	2024–2025							
F	POL	Natalia Oleszkiewicz	2 March 2002 (age 24)	FW	2025–2026							
F	POR	Ana Dias	2 October 1997 (age 29)	FW	2025–							
F	POR	Ana Isabel da Cunha Teles	29 January 2001 (age 25)		2024–2025							
F	POR	Mariana Pereira Jaleca	8 October 1997 (age 29)	MF	2021–2022							
F	POR	Inês Queiroga	30 March 2000 (age 26)	DF	2024–2025							
F	POR	Maria Vieira Maia	17 June 1999 (age 27)	MF	2023–2026							
F	PUR	Danielle Julia Marcano	20 August 1997 (age 29)	FW	2022–2024							
F	PUR	Karina Socarrás	28 November 1993 (age 32)	FW	2025–2026							
F	ROU	Cosmina Dușa	4 March 1990 (age 36)	FW	2012–2020							
F	ROU	Teodora Meluță	3 August 1999 (age 27)	DF	2024–2026							
F	ROU	Raluca Sârghe	24 July 1987 (age 39)	MF	2012–2018, 2021							
C	RSA	Letago Madiba	15 July 1991 (age 35)	FW	2019–							
F	RSA	Chuene Morifi	13 February 1991 (age 35)	MF	2024–2026							
C	RSA	Rachel Sebati	3 February 1993 (age 33)	MF	2019–							
F	RUS	Zainab Ibragimova	6 June 1995 (age 31)	FW	2024–2025							
F	RUS	Marina Kiskonen	19 March 1994 (age 32)	MF	2025							
F	RUS	Aleksandra Kulakova	7 November 1996 (age 30)		2024–2025							
F	RUS	Viktoryia Marchyk	28 August 2002 (age 24)	DF	2023–2024							
F	RUS	Natalia Mashina	28 March 1997 (age 29)	FW	2023							
C	RUS	Tatiana Stepanova	18 May 1997 (age 29)		2023–							
F	RUS	Valeria Pankratova	20 April 1995 (age 31)	MF	2017							
F	RUS	Ekaterina Ulasevich	3 March 1991 (age 35)	GK	2016–2017, 2018							
C	RWA	Zawadi Usanase	15 March 2003 (age 23)	FW	2026–	-	F	SEN	Meta Camara	14 August 1997 (age 29)	MF	2024–2025
F	SEN	Hapsatou Malado Diallo	14 April 2005 (age 21)	FW	2024–2025							
F	SEY	Pascalina Moustache	23 May 1991 (age 35)	MF	2025							
C	SLE	Salamatu Kamara	6 July 1999 (age 27)		2021–							
F	SLE	Jeneba Koroma	11 May 1999 (age 27)		2021–2022							
F	SLE	Zainab Macauley	30 June 1995 (age 31)		2022							
F	SLE	Wuyah Sao Mohai	22 November 2001 (age 24)		2021–2022							
F	SLE	Saio M. Quraishi	1 May 2003 (age 23)		2021–2023							
F	SLO	Luana Zajmi	19 January 2002 (age 24)	MF	2024							
C	SLO	Mateja Zver	15 March 1988 (age 38)	MF	2025–2026							
F	SRB	Tijana Batoćanin	6 December 2003 (age 22)	MF	2024–2025							
C	SRB	Biljana Bradić	24 April 1991 (age 35)	FW	2023–							
C	SRB	Jovana Vučićević	17 April 2001 (age 25)		2024–							
F	SRB	Jelena Cubrilo	9 January 1994 (age 32)	MF	2023–2024							
F	SRB	Milica Denda	11 December 2002 (age 23)	DF	2021–2023							
F	SRB	Jovana Đukić	26 January 2005 (age 21)	GK	2024–2025	-	C	SRB	Tatiana Ewodo	9 February 1997 (age 29)	FW	2026–
F	SRB	Marija Ilić	3 June 1993 (age 33)	DF	2021–2025							
C	SRB	Tijana Josić	19 January 2000 (age 26)	DF	2024–							
F	SRB	Anđela Kričak	13 February 1999 (age 27)	MF	2024–2025							
C	SRB	Milica Mijatović	26 June 1991 (age 35)	MF	2024–							
F	SRB	Nikoleta Nikolić	11 January 1992 (age 34)	DF	2023–2024							
F	SRB	Jovana Petrović	11 September 2001 (age 25)	GK	2022–2023							
F	SRB	Nikolina Plavšić	19 December 2001 (age 24)	FW	2024–2025							
F	SRB	Jana Stefanović	1 February 2003 (age 23)	MF	2025							
F	SRB	Andrijana Trišić	2 September 1994 (age 32)	MF	2023–2024							
C	SRB	Sara Vranić	13 March 1996 (age 30)	FW	2026–							
F	SRB	Tijana Zarković	24 December 2003 (age 22)	DF	2024–2026							
F	SVK	Patrícia Chládeková	4 April 1997 (age 29)	GK	2025							
C	SWE	Amanda Lihv	5 September 2005 (age 21)	DF	2026–							
C	SYR	Huda Bozo	1 January 2008 (age 18)	FW	2018–2019, 2023–							
C	TAN	Nasma Manduta	29 August 2007 (age 19)	MF	2026–							
F	TAN	Opah Clement	14 February 2001 (age 25)	FW	2022–2024							
F	TAN	Diana Msewa	13 November 2001 (age 25)	MF	2023–2026							
C	TKM	Aysha Amanberdiyeva	8 January 2004 (age 22)	GK	2024–							
F	TKM	Maya Musaskaya	6 January 2000 (age 26)		2022–2023							
F	TOG	Takiyatou Yaya	3 April 2000 (age 26)	MF	2021–2022							
F	TRI	Kennya Cordner	11 November 1988 (age 38)	FW	2021–2023							
C	TRI	Klil Keshwar	17 July 2000 (age 26)	GK	2026–							
C	TRI	Myla Schneider	23 October 2003 (age 23)	DF	2026–	https://www.tff.org/Default.aspx?pageId=30&kisiId=2936599]						
F	TUN	Rania Aouina	5 May 1994 (age 32)	MF	2021							
C	TUN	Amani Ayed	28 December 2006 (age 19)	MF	2026–							
f	TUN	Rahma Ghars	4 November 1994 (age 32)	DF	2018							
F	TUN	Sarra Hkili	8 February 1999 (age 27)		2021							
C	TUN	Mariem Houij	8 August 1994 (age 32)	FW	2018–							
F	TUN	Yasmine Jemai	12 June 1999 (age 27)	MF	2021–2022							
F	TUN	Salima Jobrani	25 February 1997 (age 29)	GK	2021–2022							
F	TUN	Wafe Messaoud	24 October 1994 (age 32)	MF	2021–2023							
F	TUN	Imen Mrad	8 February 1992 (age 34)	MF	2019–2020							
F	TUN	Meriem Sassi	1 April 1991 (age 35)	GK	2021–2022							
F	UGA	Joan Nabirye	25 June 1998 (age 28)	MF	2025–2026							
F	UGA	Sandra Nabweteme	1 November 1996 (age 30)	FW	2023–2024							
F	UGA	Natasha Shirazi	8 February 1996 (age 30)	FW	2022, 2025							
F	UKR	Daryna Apanashchenko	16 May 1986 (age 40)	FW	2022–2023							
C	UKR	Yana Derkach	10 July 1998 (age 28)	MF	2020–							
F	UKR	Anastasiia Illina	18 December 2001 (age 24)	DF	2023–2024							
F	UKR	Nadiia Khavanska	2 April 1989 (age 37)	MF	2022–2023							
F	UKR	Tetyana Kozyrenko	4 May 1996 (age 30)	MF	2018, 2019, 2022–							
F	UKR	Darya Kravets	24 March 1994 (age 32)	DF	2024							
F	UKR	Olena Lymar	30 November 1997 (age 28)	MF	2023–2025							
C	UKR	Olha Ovdiychuk	16 December 1993 (age 32)	MF	2022–							
F	UKR	Natia Pantsulaia	28 December 1991 (age 34)	MF	2018–2019							
F	UKR	Khrystyna Pereviznyk	19 July 1997 (age 29)	MF	2019–2020, 2023–2024							
F	UKR	Iryna Pidkuiko	18 June 1989 (age 37)	GK	2018–2019							
F	UKR	Yulia Shevchuk	25 June 1998 (age 28)	MF	2022–2023							
F	UKR	Liudmyla Shmatko	25 October 1993 (age 33)	DF	2018–2019, 2020, 2022–2026	,						
F	UKR	Polina Yanchuk	25 April 2001 (age 25)	MF	2024							
F	UKR	Olha Zeziukina	24 September 1997 (age 29)		2020							
F	URU	Ximena Velazco	31 July 1995 (age 31)	MF	2023–2024							
C	USA	Jaylen Crim	2 November 1998 (age 28)	FW/FW	2025–							
F	USA	Danesha Adams	6 June 1986 (age 40)	MF/FW	2013							
C	USA	Hanna Marie Barker	14 May 1996 (age 30)	FW	2023–							
C	USA	Sydney Bellamy	24 August 2003 (age 23)	GK	2026–							
C	USA	Rashida Beal	18 November 1994 (age 32)	DF	2022–							
C	USA	Anne Bailey Colombo	23 May 1997 (age 29)	GK	2023–							
C	USA	Opal Curless	18 May 1998 (age 28)	MF	2024–							
C	USA	Teresa Deda	19 July 2003 (age 23)	MF	2026–							
F	USA	Oumou Donzo	10 January 2003 (age 23)		2024							
C	USA	Paola Ellis	11 July 1999 (age 27)	FW	2026–							
F	USA	Skye Gunn	26 June 1997 (age 29)	MF/FW	2022							
C	USA	Aryana Harvey	2 April 1997 (age 29)	MF	2022–							
C	USA	Haley Berg	23 September 1998 (age 28)	MF	2023–							
C	USA	Kiera Laney	7 November 2003 (age 23)	MF	2026–							
C	USA	Madison Less	27 April 1998 (age 28)	GK	2023–							
F	USA	Melanie Mikoy	21 July 2000 (age 26)	DF	2024							
C	USA	Sarah Mirr	29 September 2000 (age 26)	MF	2024–							
C	USA	Shea Moyer	28 December 1998 (age 27)	MF	2024–							
C	USA	Sydny Nasello	14 April 2000 (age 26)	FW	2024–							
F	USA	Kiley Norkus	1 September 1995 (age 31)	FW	2024–2025							
C	USA	Natalie Joy Oliver	19 January 2001 (age 25)	MF	2024–							
C	USA	Hannah Reynolds	25 May 1998 (age 28)		2023–							
C	USA	Heidi Ruth	4 October 1996 (age 30)	DF	2024–							
C	USA	Elena Gracinda Santos	6 February 1997 (age 29)	FW	2022–							
C	USA	Trista Seara	21 April 1998 (age 28)	DF/MF	2023–							
C	USA	Eva Vlassopoulos	29 January 1999 (age 27)	MF	2025–							
C	USA	Jazmin Wardlow	30 October 1997 (age 29)	DF	2024–							
C	USA	Erin Yenney	20 October 1992 (age 34)	MF	2021–							
C	UZB	Diyorakhon Khabibullaeva	15 September 1999 (age 27)	FW	2024–							
F	UZB	Solikha Khusniddinova	22 January 1998 (age 28)	DF	2021–2022							
F	UZB	Setora Takaboeva	8 August 2001 (age 25)	MF	2021–2022							
F	UZB	Kamila Zaripova	19 November 1998 (age 27)	MF	2021–2022							
F	UZB	Shakhrizoda Zaynitdinova	21 September 2002 (age 24)	MF	2022							
C	VEN	Oriana Altuve	3 October 1992 (age 34)	FW	2025–							
C	VEN	Enyerliannys Higuera	15 January 2001 (age 25)	FW	2024–							
F	ZAM	Margaret Belemu	24 February 1997 (age 29)	DF	2022–2023							
F	ZAM	Hellen Chanda	19 June 1998 (age 28)	FW	2023–							
C	ZAM	Lushomo Mweemba	10 April 2001 (age 25)	DF	2024–							
C	ZAM	Hazel Nali	4 April 1998 (age 28)	GK	2022–							
C	ZAM	Martha Tembo	8 March 1998 (age 28)	DF	2024–							
C	ZAM	Misozi Zulu	11 October 1994 (age 32)	MF	2021–							
F	ZIM	Emmaculate Msipa	7 June 1992 (age 34)	MF	2021–2022							

== Notes ==
1. Born in Denmark
2. Born in Georgia
3. Born in Haiti
4. Born in Israel
5. Born in Jamaica
6. Born in Kuwait
7. Born in Liberia
8. Born in Pakistan
9. Born in Republic of South Africa
10. Born in Turkey
11. Born in Uganda
12. Born in the United States
13. Capped for the Turkey women's national under-15 football team
14. Capped for the Turkey women's national under-17 football team
15. Capped for the Turkey women's national under-19 football team
16. Holds Republic of South Africa citizenship
17. Holds Belgian citizenship
18. Holds Canadian citizenship
19. Holds Swedish citizenship
20. Holds Turkish citizenship
21. Holds United States citizenship
