= Hannah Reynolds =

Hannah Reynolds may refer to:

- Hannah Reynolds (soccer)
- Hannah Reynolds (EastEnders)
