= Chidinma (given name) =

- Gender: Female
- Language: Igbo

Origin
- Meaning: Chi is beautiful/good
- Region of origin: Igboland

Other names
- Variant form: Chidimma

Chidinma // is a very common Igbo female name. It means "chi is beautiful" or "chi is good". It is also spelled Chidimma.

Note: In Igbo, the word for "good" and "beauty" is given as mma, since Igbo phonetics doesn’t allow consonant clusters to begin a syllable (ng, mm, kw, gb, kp, and nn are all phonemes). However, because English missionaries had difficulty with Igbo’s long “mm” sound, they transcribed it as nm. This is retained in some names, like Chidinma, which became the more common, if phonetically inaccurate, spelling.

== Notable people with this name ==
- Chidimma Adetshina (born 2001), Nigerian-South African beauty pageant titleholder
- Chidinma Ekile, Nigerian singer, songwriter and actress
- Chidinma Okeke, Nigerian professional footballer
- Chidinma Aaron, Nigerian model
- Chidinma Favour Edeji, Nigerian footballer
- Chidinma and Chidiebere Aneke, Nigerian actresses and movie producers
