= Chkuaseli =

Chkuaseli (Georgian: ჭკუასელი) is a Georgian surname. Notable people with the surname include:

- Avtandil Chkuaseli (1931–1994), Soviet football goalkeeper
- Nino Chkuaseli (born 1988), Georgian football goalkeeper
- Simon Chkuaseli (born 1984), Political Advisor
