= Amed S.F.K. (women's football) =

Football club in Turkey

Amed
- Full name: Amed Sportif Faaliyetler Kulübü
- Founded: 1990
- Ground: Talaytepe Amedspor Sports Facility
- Coordinates: 37°57′25″N 40°11′35″E
- Chairman: (Turkey) Nahit Eren
- Manager: (Turkey) Cemal Cengizoğlu
- League: Turkish Women's Super League
- 2025–26: 7th
- Website: www.amedspor.com.tr/

Amed Sportif Faaliyetler Kulübü, shortly Amed S.K. is the women's football team of the same-named Diyarbakır-based sports club, formerly known as Diyarbakır Büyükşehir Belediyespor. The team completed the 2016–17 season of Turkish Women's Second Football League as runner-up, and were promoted to the Turkish Women's First Football League.

== History ==
The club was renamed Amed Sportif Faaliyetler (literally Amed Sportive Activities) from the metropolitan municipality sponsored club Diyarbakır Büyükşehir Belediyespor in August 2015. "Amed" is the name of Diyarbakır in Kurdish language.

The team finished the 2016–17 Women's Second League season as division champion and winner after a play-off match, and were promoted to the First League. From 2018 until February 2019 the fans of the club were banned to enter the stadium at away games.

== Club name history ==
- Diyarbakır Büyükşehir Belediyespor (2011–2015)
- Amed Sportif Faaliyetler (2015– )

== Logo and colours ==
The club logo features a white, double-headed eagle with its wings spread positioned above a V-shape figure, on a green background reminiscent of the Diyarbakır Fortress. It also includes the club name, "Amed SK", and the founding year, "1990". The origin of the eagle figure in the club’s emblem dates back to the ancient history of Mesopotamia. Club colurs are green and red.

== Stadium ==
Amed SFK play their home matches at Talaytepe Sports Facility in Talaytepe neighborhood of Kayapınar district in Diyarbakır.

== Statistics ==
As of 14 November 2026

Season	League	Pos.	Pld	W	D	L	GF	GA	GD	Pts
2011–12	Second League; Gr. Southeastern	3	8	5	0	3	35	15	+20	15
2012–13	Second League Gr. 7	9	13	11	1	1	83	11	+72	34
2013–14	Second League Gr. 8	3	16	11	2	3	82	17	+65	35
2014–15	Third League Gr. 7	7	14	11	2	1	75	9	+66	35
2015–16	Third League Gr. 8	2	21	19	1	1	150	18	+132	56
2016–17	Second League Gr. 2	2	18	12	3	3	54	21	+33	39
2017–18	First League	7	18	5	1	12	21	40	−19	16
2018–19	First League	7	18	5	2	11	21	43	−22	17
2019–20	First League	10 (Note: Season discontinued due to COVID-19 pandemic in Turkey)	15	3	1	511	18	55	−37	10
2020–21	First League Gr. A	14	3	0	0	3	2	18	−16	0
2021–22 ]	Super League Gr. B	7	22	8	1	13	30	51	−21	25
2022–23	Super League Gr. B	4	18	8	4	6	31	22	+9	28
2022–23	Play-offs	QF	4	1	1	2	3	9	−6	4
2023–24	Super League	10	30	9	8	13	42	54	−14	35
2024–25	Super League	11	26	6	5	15	32	53	-21	23
2025–26	Super League	7	30	17	3	10	76	34	+42	54
2026–27	Super League	9	11 (Note: Season in progress)	4	1	6	17	16	+1	13
Green marks a season followed by promotion, red a season followed by relegation.

- Legend:

== Current squad ==
As of on 14 November 2026

Note: Flags indicate national team as defined under FIFA eligibility rules; some limited exceptions apply. Players may hold more than one non-FIFA nationality.

No.	Pos.	Nation	Player
1	GK	KOS	Florentina Kolgeci
29	GK	TUR	Sude Nur Sözüdoğru
5	DF	TUR	Sema Polat
7	DF	HAI	Betina Petit-Frère
14	DF	TUR	Nazlı Örnek
15	DF	CMR	Mariane Maague
22	DF	TUR	Beyza Semercioğlu
27	DF	TUR	Nide Dağlıoğlu
28	DF	TUR	Rabiya Karagül
6	MF	TUR	Meryem Sevent
18	MF	TUR	Tuana Şahin

No.	Pos.	Nation	Player
20	MF	TUR	Melike Dimçer
21	MF	TUR	Büşra Becerikli
61	MF	TUR	Kevser Kartal
65	MF	TUR	Esmanur Dural
10	FW	BIH	Vina Crnoja
12	FW	BEN	Yolande Gnammi
17	FW	TUR	Seval Tekin
36	FW	SRB	Sara Vranić
97	FW	TUR	Buket Karadağ
99	FW	CMR	Tatiana Ewodo

== Former notable players ==
Azerbaijan

- Ayshan Ahmadova
- Vusala Hajiyeva
- Gunay İsmayilova
- Sona Rahimova
- Vusala Seyfatdinova

Botswana

- Lone Gaofetoge

Brazil

- Camila Santos

Burkina Faso

- Juliette Nana

Cameroon

- Jacquette Ada
- Rose Bella

Canada

- Christabel Oduro

Democratic Republic of the Congo

- Fideline Ngoy

El Salvador

- Samaria Gómez

Georgia

- Teona Bakradze
- Tatia Gabunia

Ghana

- Juanita Aguadze
- Patience Peterson-Kundok

Iran

- Maryam Yektaei

Ivory Coast

- Melissa Behinan
- Michaela Koutouan

Jordan

- Enas Al-Jamaeen
- Malak Shannak

Kazakhstan

- Angelina Portnova

Nigeria-

- Chidinma Favour Edeji
- Ugochi Emenayo
- Genevieve Ngo Mbeleck

Republic of the Congo

- Fideline Ngoy

Russia

- Ekaterina Ulasevich

Serbia

- Nikolina Plavšić

Tanzania

- Diana Msewa

Turkey

- Nagehan Akşan
- Güzide Alçu
- Remziye Bakır
- Zelal Baturay
- Ezgi Çağlar

United States

- Kiley Norkus

== Kit history ==
2017–18 away	2018–19 home	2018–19 away	2019–20 away	2021–22 home	2022–23 away
2024–25 home

== Squad history ==
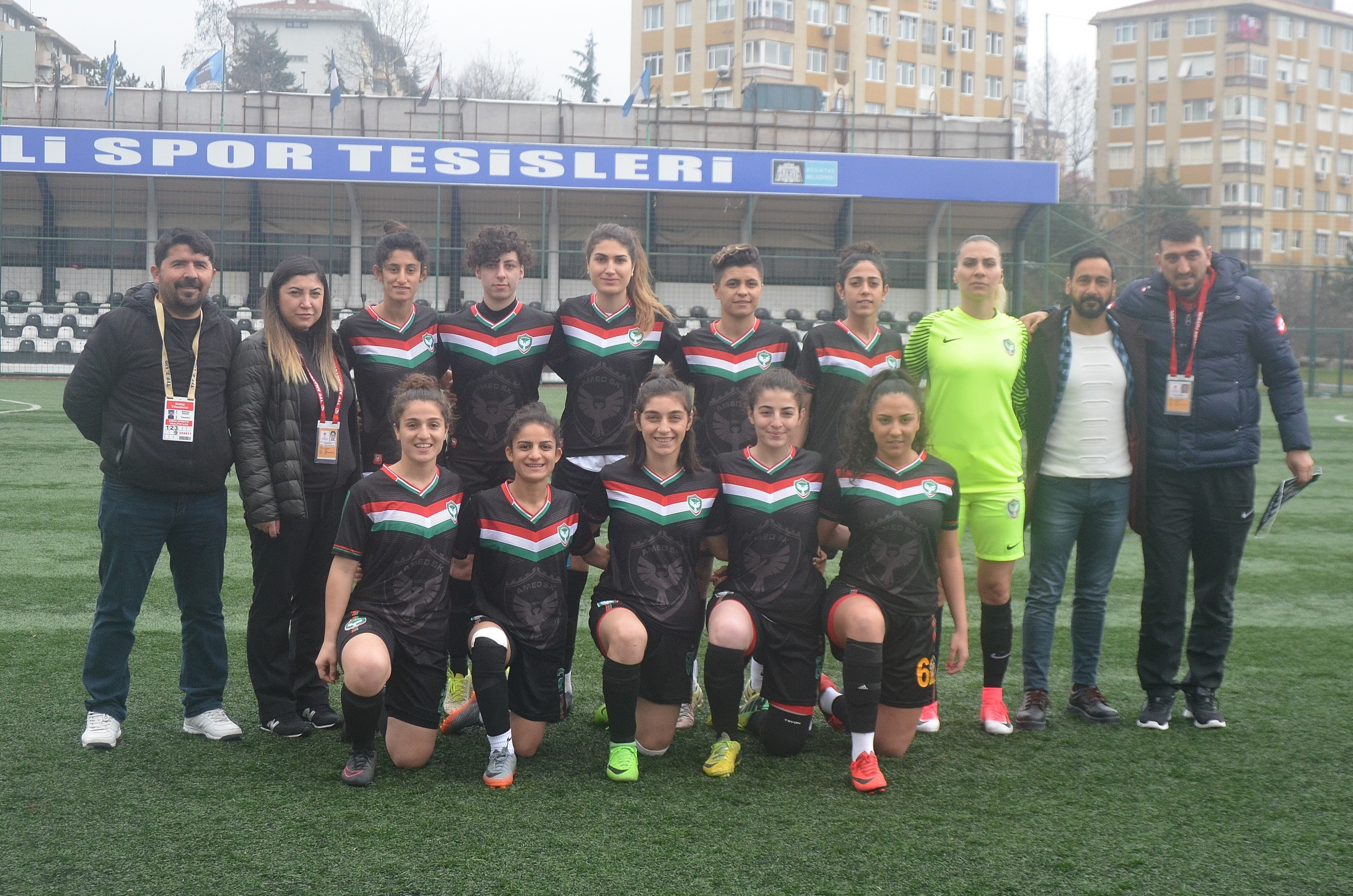
Amed SK squad in the 2017–18 Women's First League season.

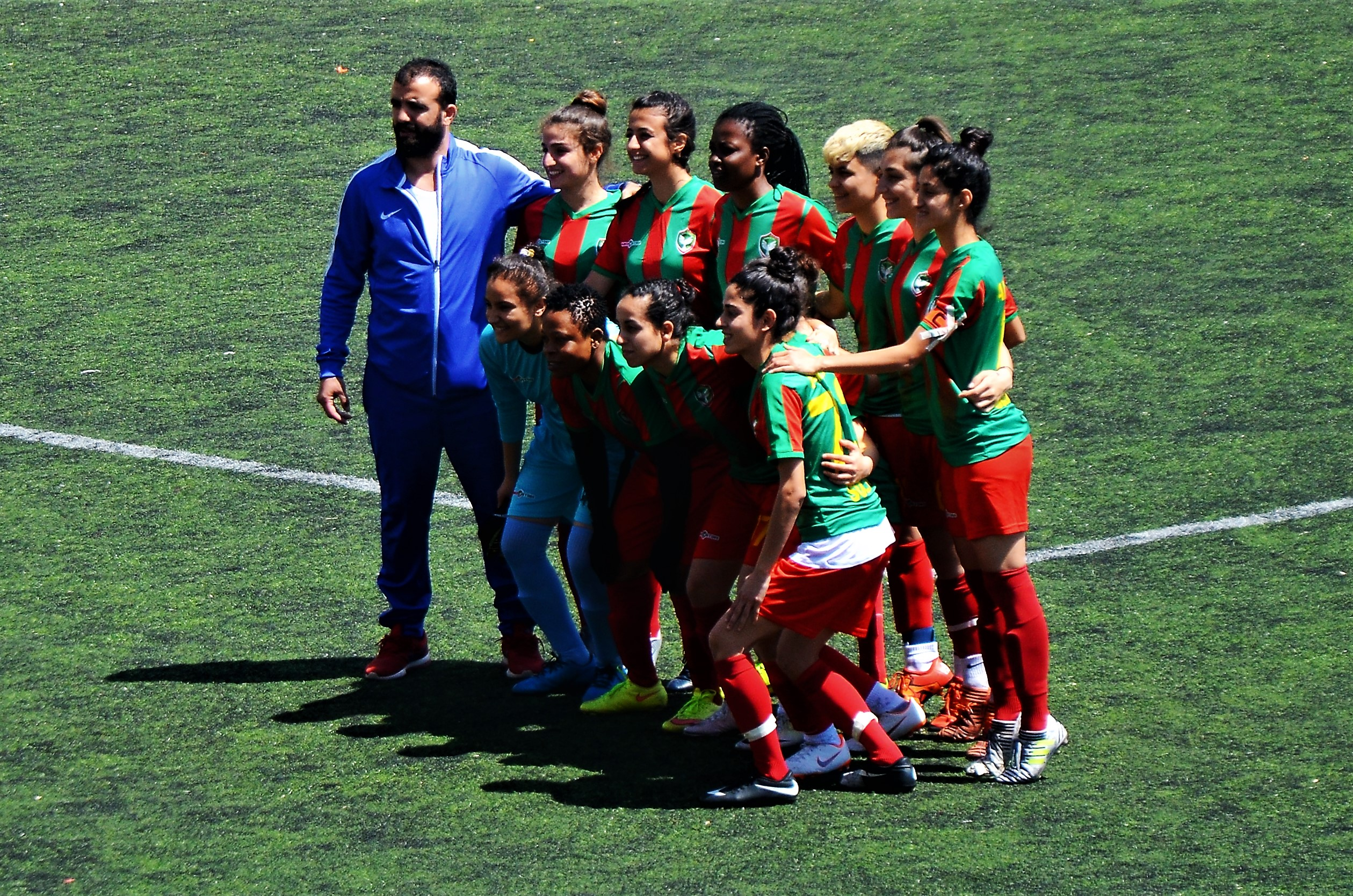
Amed SK squad in the 2018–19 Women's First League season.

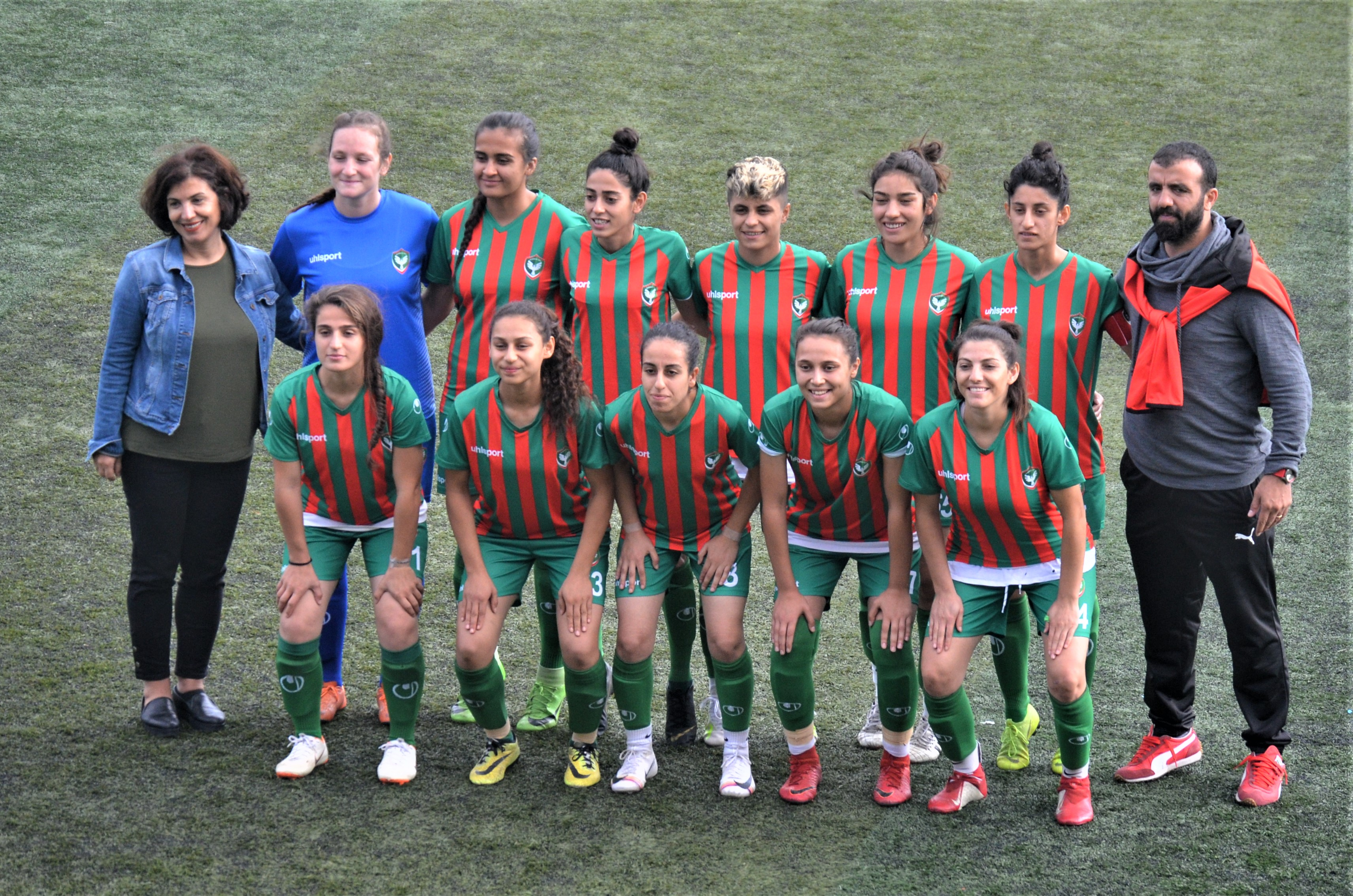
Amed S.K. squad in the 2019-20 Women's First League
