= Vusala Hajiyeva =

Azerbaijani footballer (born 1999)

Personal information
- Date of birth: 3 October 1999 (age 27)
- Position: Midfielder

Team information
- Current team: Yüksekova
- Number: 77

Senior career*
Years	Team	Apps	(Gls)
2015–2016	8 – İOEUGiM		
2016–2017	Sumgayit		
2017–2019	Torpedo Izhevsk		
2018–2019	Qubek		
2022	Samegrelo Chkhorotsku		
2021–2022	ABB Fomget	20	(0)
2022–2023	Hatay	13	(1)
2023–2024	Amed	27	(1)
2024–2025	Ünye	10	(0)
2025–	Yüksekova	3	(0)

International career^{‡}
2014–2015	Azerbaijan U17	6	(0)
2016–2018	Azerbaijan U19	9	(0)
2019–	Azerbaijan	22	(0)
- * Club domestic league appearances and goals as of 5 October 2025 ‡ National team caps and goals as of 31 May 2026

Vusala Hajiyeva (Azerbaijani: Vüsalə Hacıyeva; born 3 October 1999) is an Azerbaijani women's football midfielder who plays for the Turkish Super Leaue club Yüksekova, and the Azerbaijan national team.

== Club career ==
Hajiyeva plays in the midfielder position.

She played in her country for 8 – İOEUGiM (2015–16), Sumgayit FK (2016–17), FC Qubek (2018–19), as well as in Russia for FC Torpedo Izhevsk (2017–18, 2018–19), and in Georgia for FC Samegrelo Chkhorotsku (2022).

In December 2021, Hajiyeva moved to Turkey and joined the Ankara-based club Fomget to play in the 2021–22 Turkish Super League. In the 2022–23 Turkish Super League season, she transferred to Hatayspor. In the second half of the season, she went to Amed in Diyarbakır. She scored one goal in 27 matches played in total.

End August 2024, she went back home, returned to Turkey, however, to join the newly to the Super League promoted club Ünye in Ordu.

In September 2025, she transferred to Yüksekova in Hakkari Province, which was p,recently promoted to the Turkish Super League .

== International career ==
Hajiyeva is a member of Azerbaijan national team.

== See also ==
- List of Azerbaijan women's international footballers
