= Christabel Oduro =

Canadian soccer player (born 1992)

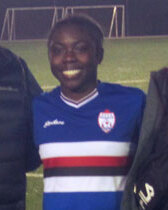
- Oduro in 2021

Personal information
- Full name: Christabel Oppong Oduro
- Date of birth: November 1, 1992 (age 34)
- Place of birth: Brampton, Ontario, Canada
- Height: 1.60 m (5 ft 3 in)
- Position: Forward

Youth career
- 2004–?: Brampton Brams United

College career
Years	Team	Apps	(Gls)
2010–2013	Memphis Tigers	84	(47)

Senior career*
Years	Team	Apps	(Gls)
2010	Toronto Lady Lynx		
2011	Hamilton Rage		
2014	Ottawa Fury		
2015–2016	Herforder	20	(10)
2016	Woodbridge Strikers	13	(12)
2016–2019	Ramat HaSharon		
2019–2020	IFK Kalmar	21	(8)
2020–2021	Birkirkara	10	(7)
2021	Grindavík	17	(14)
2021	Woodbridge Strikers	5	(5)
2022	Víkingur	17	(12)
2022–2023	Beşiktaş	16	(2)
2023–2024	Nantes	20	(3)
2024	Amed	6	(0)
2025	Halifax Tides FC	11	(0)
2026–	Woodbridge Strikers	0	(0)

International career
2010–2012	Canada U20	9	(2)
2013	Canada	5	(0)
- * Club domestic league appearances and goals as of October 17, 2025

Christabel Oppong Oduro (born November 1, 1992) is a Canadian women's soccer forward who plays for the Woodbridge Strikers in the Ontario Premier League. She has made five appearances for the Canada women's national soccer team and played domestic football in Canada, the United States, Germany, Israel, Sweden, Malta and Turkey.

== Personal life ==
Oduro is from Brampton, Ontario, Canada. She has Ghanaian heritage, as both of her parents where born in Ghana, and is the cousin of Ghanaian international soccer player Dominic Oduro. Oduro attended St. Thomas Aquinas Secondary School, where aside from soccer, she played basketball as a guard, volleyball, and participated in cross-country running. She studied at the University of Memphis, where she joined their soccer program.

== Club career ==
In 2014, Oduro signed for Ottawa Fury. In 2015, she signed for German team Herforder SV Borussia Friedenstal (HSV). She scored 10 goals in 20 games for HSV, before leaving the club in 2016 to return to Canada for personal reasons. In 2016, she made 13 appearances and scored 12 goals for the Woodbridge Strikers in League1 Ontario that year. From 2016 to 2019, Oduro played for Israeli team Ramat HaSharon. Ramat HaSharon finished second in the Ligat Nashim twice whilst Oduro was playing with them, and she also won the Israeli Women's Cup with the club. In 2019, she played for IFK Kalmar in the Swedish Elitettan; she made 21 appearances and scored eight goals in the 2019 season. In 2020, Oduro signed for Maltese club Birkirkara. In her second start for Birkirkara, she scored a hat-trick as Birkirkara beat Raiders Luxol 12–0. She has also played for Birkirkara in the 2020–21 UEFA Women's Champions League. In February 2021, Oduro signed for Icelandic 1. deild kvenna side Grindavík. She scored 14 goals in 17 matches for Grindavík. She later played for Woodbridge Strikers in the 2021 Women's League1 Ontario season. Ahead of the 2022 1. deild kvenna season, she signed for Víkingur. In October 2022, Oduro signed for Turkish team Beşiktaş. In July 2023, Oduro joined French Division 2 Féminine side FC Nantes.

In September 2024, she moved again to Turkey, and joined the Diyarbakır-based club Amed.

In January 2025, Oduro signed with Halifax Tides FC in the Northern Super League.

== International career ==
Oduro played for Canada under-20s at the 2012 CONCACAF Women's U-20 Championship, where Canada finished second. She also represented them at the 2012 FIFA U-20 Women's World Cup, where the team failed to reach the knockout stages of the competition.

In March 2012, Oduro received her first call up to the Canada women's national soccer team. She played for Canada in the 2013 Cyprus Women's Cup, where Canada finished second. In total, Oduro has made five appearances, including four starts, for Canada. All of her appearances for Canada were in non-competitive matches. In 2019, Oduro said that she wanted to play for the Ghana women's national football team. She would be eligible as she has not yet played in a competitive fixture for Canada. In 2022, Oduro said that she wanted to switch football nationalities to Ghana.
