= Ekaterina Ulasevich =

Russian footballer

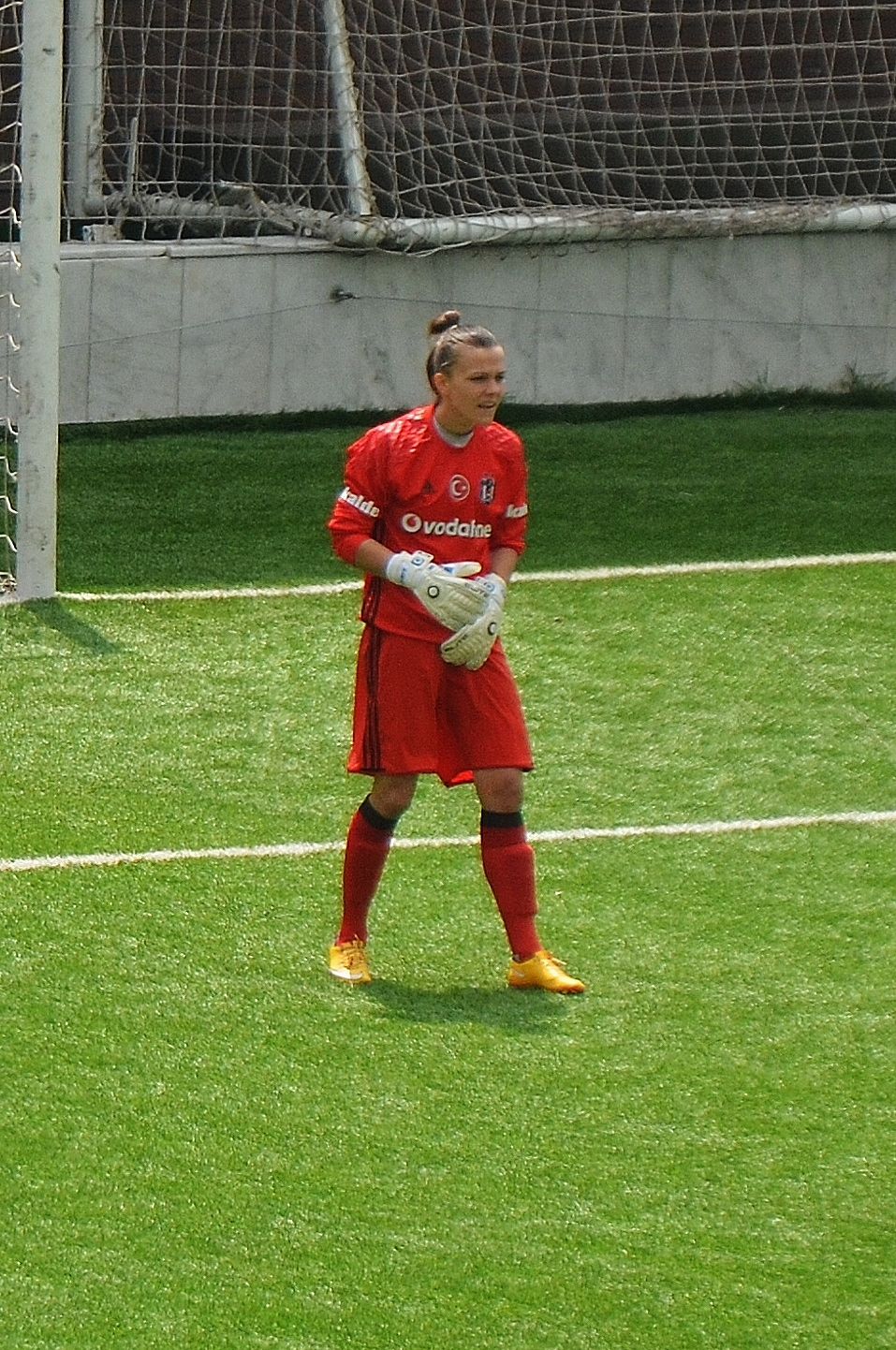
- Ekaterina Ulasevich (2016–17 season)

Personal information
- Date of birth: March 3, 1991 (age 35)
- Place of birth: Russian Federation
- Height: 1.69 m (5 ft 7 in)
- Position: Goalkeeper

Senior career*
Years	Team	Apps	(Gls)
2009–2010	Zvezda Zvenigorod	17	(0)
2011/12	Mordovochka Saransk	17	(0)
2013	WFC Rossiyanka	5	(0)
2014–2015	Ryazan VDV	6	(0)
2016–2017	Beşiktaş JK	21	(0)
2018	Olimpia Cluj		
2018	Amed S.K.	7	(0)

International career^{‡}
2009–2010	Russia women's U-19	7	(0)
- * Club domestic league appearances and goals as of 23 December 2018 ‡ National team caps and goals as of 14 March 2010

Ekaterina Ulasevich (Russian: Екатерина Уласевич) (born March 3, 1991) is a Russian women's football goalkeeper. She played in the Turkish Women's First Football League for Amed S.K. in Istanbul with jersey number 91. She appeared in the Russia women's national under-19 football team.

== Playing career ==
=== Club ===
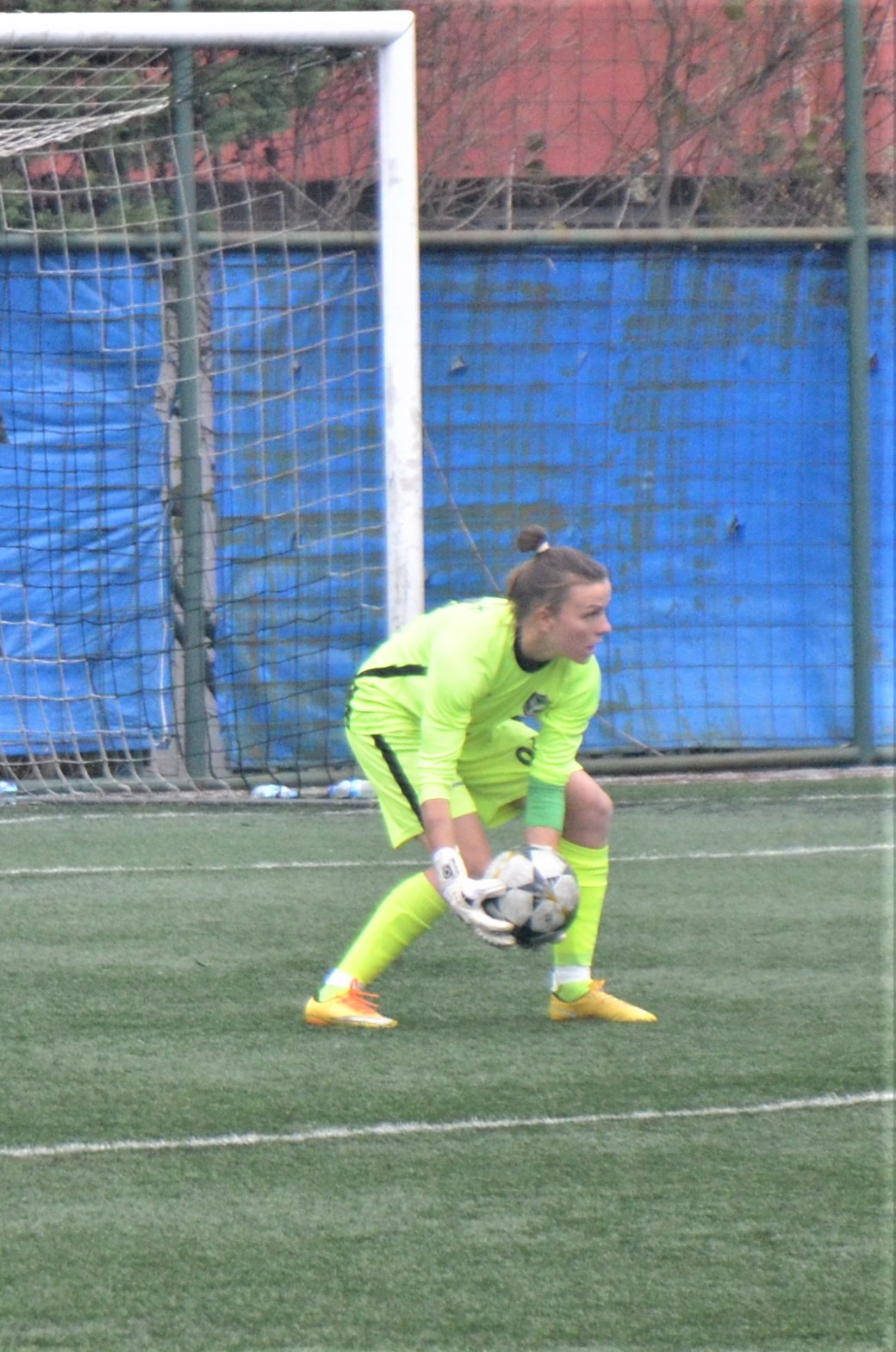
Ekaterina Ulasevich of Amed S.K. in the 2018–19 Turkish Women's First League.

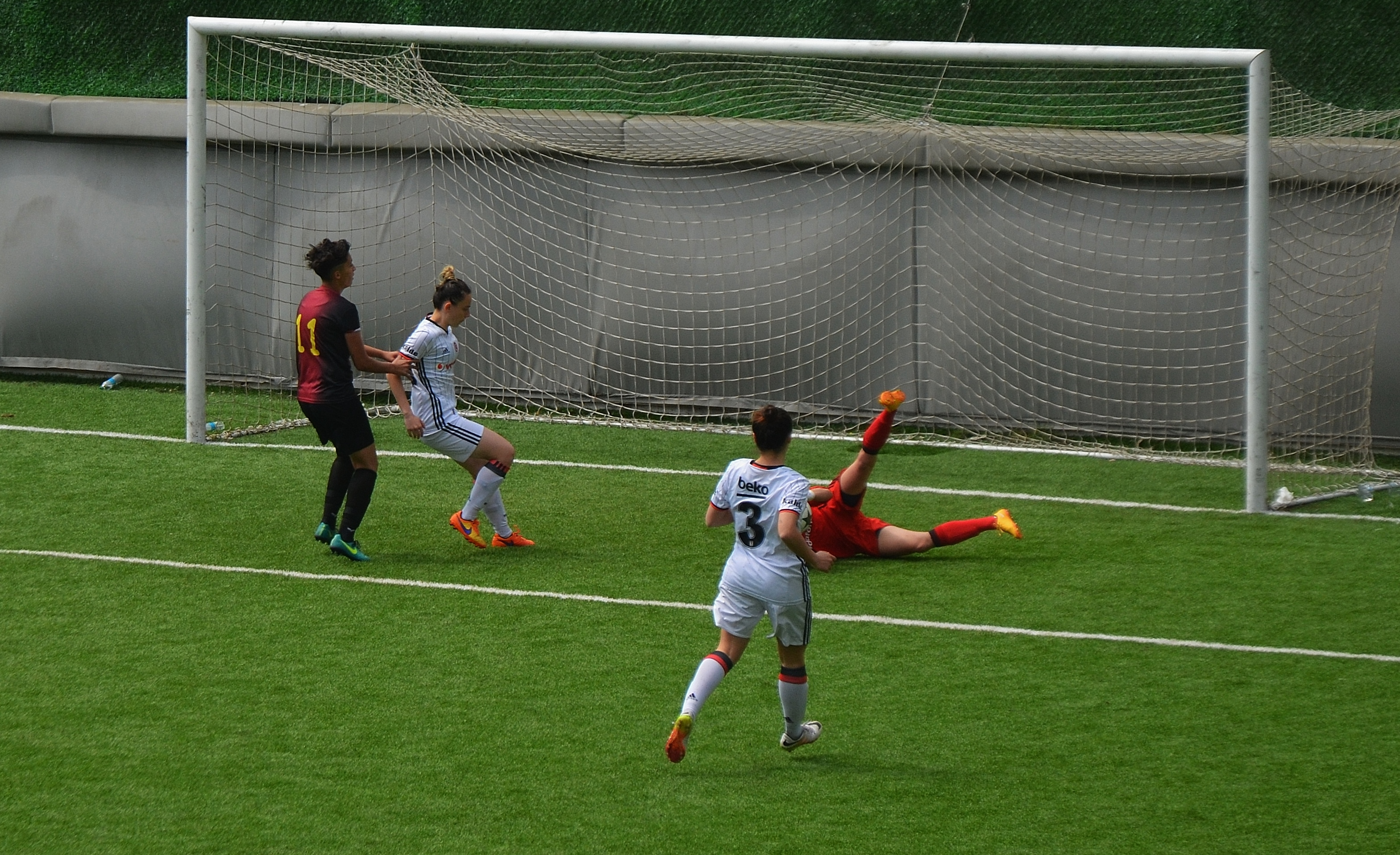
Ekaterina Ulasevich making a save for Beşiktaş J.K. in the 2016–17 season's play-off home match against 1207 Antalya Döşemealtı Belediyespor.

Ekaterina Ulasevich played for Zvezda Zvenigorod in the 2009 and 2010 Russian Women's Football Championship. In the 2011/2012 season, she was with Mordovochka Saransk in the 2011/12 season and then with WFC Rossiyanka in 2013. After playing two seasons for Ryazan VDV in 2014 and 2015, she moved to Turkey to join the Istanbul-based Turkish Women's First Football League team Beşiktaş J.K. in the 2016–17 season. She played for a few matches in the Romanian League in 2018 for champions Olimpia Cluj. In the 2018–19 Turkish Women's First League, she joined Amed S.K. from Diyarbakır.

== International ==
Ulasevich was a member of the Russia women's national under-19 football team. She played in three matches of the 2009 Kuban Spring Tournament. The same year, she took part at the 2009 UEFA Women's Under-19 Championship Second qualifying round match against Slovakia on 28 April. In 2010, she appeared in three matches of the 2010 Kuban Spring Tournament. She capped in total seven times for the Russia women's U-19 team.

== Career statistics ==
As of match played 23 December 2018.

Club	Season	League			Continental		National		Total	
Club	Season	Division	Apps	Goals	Apps	Goals	Apps	Goals	Apps	Goals
Zvezda Zvenigorod	2009	Russian Championship	3	0	–	–	4	0	7	0
Zvezda Zvenigorod	2010	Russian Championship	14		–	–	3	0	17	0
Zvezda Zvenigorod	Total		17	0	–	–	7	0	24	0
Mordovochka Saransk	2011–12	Russian Championship	17	0	–	–	0	0	17	0
Mordovochka Saransk	Total		17	0	–	–	0	0	17	0
WFC Rossiyanka	2013	Russian Championship	5	0	–	–	0	0	5	0
WFC Rossiyanka	Total		5	0	–	–	0	0	5	0
Ryazan VDV	2014	Russian Championship	1	0	–	–	0	0	1	0
Ryazan VDV	2015	Russian Championship	5	0	–	–	0	0	5	0
Ryazan VDV	Total		6	0	–	–	0	0	6	0
Beşiktaş J.K.	2016–17	Turkish First League	21	0	–	–	0	0	21	0
Beşiktaş J.K.	Total		21	0	–	–	0	0	21	0
Amed S.K.	2018–19	Turkish First League	7	0	–	–	0	0	7	0
Amed S.K.	Total		7	0	–	–	0	0	7	0
Career total			73	0	–	–	7	0	80	0

== Honours ==
Turkeish Women's First Football League
Beşiktaş J.K.

Runners-up (1): 2016–17
