= Teona Todadze =

Georgian women's football midfielder (born 1993)

Personal information
- Full name: Teona Todadze
- Date of birth: March 3, 1993 (age 33)
- Place of birth: Baghdati, Georgia
- Position: Midfielder

Team information
- Current team: WFC Lanchkhuti

Senior career*
Years	Team	Apps	(Gls)
2009–10	FC Baia Zugdidi		
2012–2015	Adana İdmanyurduspor	27	(7)
2015–2016	İlkadım Belediyespor	12	(4)
2016–	WFC Lanchkhuti		

International career^{‡}
2009–	Georgia U-19	3	(0)
2009–	Georgia	14	(0)
- * Club domestic league appearances and goals as of January 3, 2016 ‡ National team caps and goals as of April 9, 2013

Teona Todadze (Georgian: თეონა თოდაძე, born March 3, 1993) is a Georgian women's football midfielder who plays for WFC Lanchkhuti. She played in the Turkish First League for İlkadım Belediyespor with jersey number 99. She is a member of the Georgian national team since 2009.

== Playing career ==
=== Club ===
Teona Todadze played in the club FC Baia Zugdidi, which became Georgian champion in the 2009–10 season. After dissolving of the Georgian women's league in 2010, she moved to Turkey, and signed with Adana İdmanyurduspor to play in the 2012–13 Turkish Women's First Football League. After appearing two full seasons and a half season for the Adana-based team, she moved in February 2015 to İlkadım Belediyesi Yabancılar Pazarı Spor in Samsun.

She debuted at the 2010–11 UEFA Women's Champions League – Group 5 playing for FC Baia Zugdidi against the Italian team AGSM Verona on August 7, 2010. She participated in three qualifying round matches.

=== International ===
Todadze was admitted to the Georgia women's under 19 national team, and played her first match against France at the 2010 UEFA Women's U-19 Championship First qualifying round – Group 7 on September 19, 2009. She took part in the games against Serbian and Turkish junior women in the same tournament.

Appearing in the Georgia women's national team, she participated at all eight of the 2011 FIFA Women's World Cup qualification – UEFA Group 3 matches against Denmark, Scotland, Bulgaria, and Greece.

She played in three games of the UEFA Women's Euro 2013 qualifying – Group 2 appearing against Malta, Armenia, and Faroe Islands.

Todadze participated at the 2015 FIFA Women's World Cup qualification – Group 2 matches against Lithuania, Montenegro, and Faroe Islands held in Lithuania in April 2013.

== Career statistics ==
As of match played January 3, 2016.

Club	Season	League			Continental		National		Total	
Club	Season	Division	Apps	Goals	Apps	Goals	Apps	Goals	Apps	Goals
FC Baia Zugdidi	2009–2011	Georgia championship			3	0	14	0	17	0
FC Baia Zugdidi	Total				3	0	14	0	17	0
Adana İdmanyurduspor	2012–13	Turkish Women's First League	15	4	–	–	3	0	18	4
Adana İdmanyurduspor	2013–14	First League	12	3	-	–	0	0	12	3
Adana İdmanyurduspor	2014–15	First League	0	0	-	–			0	0
Adana İdmanyurduspor	Total		27	7	–	–	3	0	30	7
İlkadım Belediyespor	2014–15	First League	4	1	–	–			4	1
İlkadım Belediyespor	2015–16	First League	8	3	–	–			8	3
İlkadım Belediyespor	Total		12	4	–	–			12	4
Career total			39	11	3	0	17	0	59	11

== Honours ==
=== Club ===
Georgia Championship

FC Baia Zugdidi
Winners (1): 2009–10

WFC Lanchkhuti
Winners (1): 2023
