= Tatia Gabunia =

Georgian footballer

Personal information
- Date of birth: 7 July 2000 (age 26)
- Place of birth: Georgia
- Position: Goalkeeper

Senior career*
Years	Team	Apps	(Gls)
2020–2023	WFC Lanchkhuti		(0)
2023	Amed SFK		(0)
2023-2024	Kvartali FC	13	(1)
2025-	WFC Lanchkhuti	0	(0)

International career^{‡}
2016–2017	Georgia U-17	6	(0)
2017–2019	Georgia U-19	18	(0)
2022–	Georgia	12	(0)
- * Club domestic league appearances and goals as of 31 July 2024 ‡ National team caps and goals as of 23:50, 31 July 2024(UTC)

Tatia Gabunia (Georgian: თათია გაბუნია, born 7 July 2000) is a Georgian footballer, who plays as a goalkeeper. She is currently a part of WFC Lanchkhuti, Tbilisi, whilst representing Georgia women's national team.

== Club career ==
Gabunia played in her country for WFC Lanchkhuti, but in December 2022, she moved to Turkey, and signed with the Diyarbakir-based club Amed SFK to play in the second half of the 2022–23 Super League. After only one appearance for Amed SFK, she returned home on 3 March 2023. She is now currently playing for WFC Lanchkhuti and has 13 appearances for the club with only 6 goals conceded. With the club currently being on the top of the Georgia women's football championship.

== International career ==
Gabunia has been capped for the Georgia national team, appearing for the team during the UEFA Women's Euro 2021 qualifying cycle. She has also been called up in the national team in 2023–2024 seasons, in which she has been the starting goalkeeper for all the matches. She was a part of the legendary win against Luxembourg and an astonishing win against Lithuania, which led the national team into the European qualification play off. Because of the win against Lithuania, Georgia will face Ireland for the first round of European qualification play offs.
