= Patience Peterson-Kundok =

Ghanaian association football player

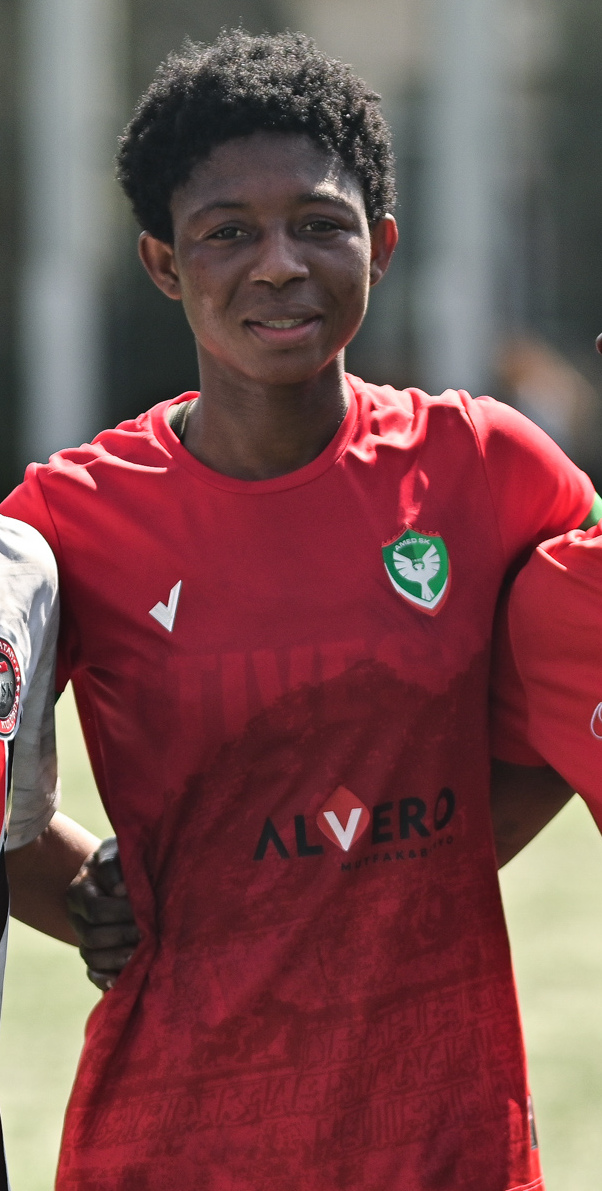

Personal information
- Date of birth: 29 September 2001 (age 25)
- Place of birth: Techiman, Bono East Region, Ghana
- Height: 1.63 m (5 ft 4 in)
- Position: Midfielder

Team information
- Current team: Trabzonspor
- Number: 14

Senior career*
| Years | Team | Apps | (Gls) |
| | Ampem Darkoa | 21 | (9) |
| | Noravank | 16 | (13) |
| 2022–2023 | Hakkarigücü | 14 | (0) |
| 2023–2024 | Amed | 23 | (0) |
| 2024– | Trabzonspor | 1 | (0) |

International career
- Ghana U-17
| 2018–2020 | Ghana U-20 | | |
- * Club domestic league appearances and goals as of 5 February 2023

Patience Peterson-Kundok (born 29 September 2001) is a Ghanaian professional women's football midfielder who plays for Trabzonsporr in the Turkish Super League. She was a member of the Ghana national U-17 and U-20 teams and earned a call-up to the senior national women's team in 2023.

== Club career ==
The 1.63 m (5 ft 4 in) tall footballer plays as midfielder.

Peterson-Kundok played for [Ampem Darkoa in her country's Premier League. In the 2020–21 season, she scored five goals in 28 matches played.

She went to Armenia in August 2021, and joined Noravank SC.

In October 2022, she moved to Turkey and signed a one-year contract with Hakkarigücü to play in the Women's Super League. She played in the 2023–24 Turkish Super League season for Amed in Diyarbakır. In September 2024, she transferred to Trabzonspor.

== International career ==
Peterson-Kundok appeared several times in the Ghana national U-17 (Black Maidens) and the U-120 (Black Princesses) teams. She played for the Ghana U-20 team at the 2018 FIFA U-20 Women's World Cup held in France. She was called up to the U-20 team again for the 2020 FIFA U-20 Women's World Cup qualifying round.
