= Maryam Yektaei =

Iranian footballer (born 1993)

Personal information
- Full name: Maryam Yektaei
- Date of birth: 19 June 1993 (age 33)
- Place of birth: Urmia, Iran
- Height: 1.77 m (5 ft 9 1/2 in)
- Position: Goalkeeper

Team information
- Current team: Amed
- Number: 1

Senior career*
Years	Team	Apps	(Gls)
2022	Beşiktaş	8	(0)
2023	Fatih Karagümrük	5	(0)
2023–2024	Beşiktaş	15	(0)
2024–	Amed	12	(0)

International career
2009–2011	Iran U19		
2013–	Iran	32	(0)
- * Club domestic league appearances and goals as of 22 December 2024

Maryam Yektaei (Persian: مریم یکتایی; born 19 June 1993 in Urmia) is an Iranian professional women's football goalkeeper who plays in the Turkish Super League for Amed. She has been a member of the Iran women's national team.

== Club career ==
In June 2021, she moved to Turkey and joined Beşiktaş to play in the Turkish Super League.

Yektaei signed an agreement with Fatih Karagümrük for six months to play in the second half of the 2022–23 Super League season. She played eight games here, including a play-off match. She returned to her former team Beşiktaş in the 2023 summer transfer period, and capped in 15 matches in the 2023–24 Super League season.

For the 2024–25 Super League season, she transferred to the Diyarbakır-based club Amed.
