= Samaria Gómez =

Salvadoran footballer (born 2002)

Personal information
- Full name: Samaria Saraí Gómez Mejía
- Date of birth: 18 February 2002 (age 24)
- Place of birth: San Martín, El Salvador
- Height: 1.56 m (5 ft 1 in)
- Position: Forward

Team information
- Current team: Atlante
- Number: 16

Youth career
- 2017–2019: AD Legends

Senior career*
Years	Team	Apps	(Gls)
2019–2021	Real Estelí	?	(52)
2021–2022	Le Havre	6	(0)
2022–2023	Elpides Karditsas	?	(14)
2023–2024	Bnot Netanya	0	(0)
2024–2025	Necaxa	22	(0)
2025–2026	Amed	2	(0)
2026–	Atlante	0	(0)

International career^{‡}
2020	El Salvador U-20	3	(1)
2022–	El Salvador	10	(4)
- * Club domestic league appearances and goals as of 28 September 2025 ‡ National team caps and goals as of 4 June 2024

Samaria Saraí Gómez Mejía (born 18 February 2002) is a Salvadoran footballer who plays as a forward for Turkish Super League club Amed S.F.K. and the El Salvador women's national team.

== Early life ==
Gómez grew up in the San Martín municipality of San Salvador. As a child, she played in youth tournaments in San Bartolo and Ilopango, often as the only girl on her team.

== Club career ==
=== AD Legends ===
In 2017, the 15-year-old Gómez began playing for AD Legends' under-17 team, ultimately winning five consecutive championships with the side.

=== Real Estelí F.C. ===
In 2019, the 17-year-old Gómez moved to Nicaragua to sign with Real Estelí. In 2021, she won back-to-back Nicaraguan women's football championships with the club.

=== Le Havre AC ===
In October 2021, the 19-year-old Gómez signed with French team Le Havre AC. She made her debut in a first-round Coupe de France victory over Valenciennes FC.

Gómez scored her first goal for the club in the subsequent second-round match against OCNA, netting Le Havre's third goal in a 4–1 win. On the final day of the season, Gómez was a 67th-minute substitute in a 4–0 win over FC Vendenheim that secured Le Havre's promotion to Division 1 Féminine.

=== Elpides Karditsas ===
In September 2022, Gómez signed a one-year deal with Greek team Elpides Karditsas. She made her Greek A Division debut on 20 November 2022, scoring a hat-trick in a 0–6 victory away to Avantes Chalkida.

=== Bnot Netanya F.C. ===
In September 2023, Gómez signed with Israeli team Bnot Netanya F.C.

=== Club Necaxa ===
In June 2024, Gómez signed with Liga MX Femenil team Club Necaxa.

=== Amed S.F.K. ===
In September 2025, Gómez moved to Turkey, and sigmed with the Diyarbakır-based club Amed to play in the Super League.

== International career ==
On April 8, 2022, Gómez earned her first senior cap for El Salvador, coming on as a half-time substitute in a 2–0 win over Barbados.
