= Ugochi Emenayo =

Nigerian football player (born 1997)

Personal information
- Full name: Ugochi Cynthia Emenayo
- Date of birth: 20 December 1997 (age 28)
- Place of birth: Nigeria
- Position: Defender

Team information
- Current team: Amed
- Number: 3

Senior career*
Years	Team	Apps	(Gls)
- Nasarawa Amazons
2021–2023	Konak	32	(7)
2023–2025	Bornova Hitab	28	(3)
2025–	Amed	2	(0)

International career
2012	Nigeria U-17		
2016	Nigeria U-20		
- Nigeria
- * Club domestic league appearances and goals as of 28 Septembery 2025

Ugochi Cynthia Emenayo (born 20 December 1997) is a Nigerian professional women's football defender who plays in the Turkish Super League for Amed in İzmir and the Nigeria women's national football team.

== Club career ==
Ugochi played as a defender for Nasarawa Amazons F.C. in her country's NWFL Premiership.

In December 2021, Ugochi moved to Turkey, and joined Konak to play in the 2021–22 Women's Super League season.

After playing two seasons in the Women's Super League, she transferred for the 2023–24 season to Bornova Hitab, which was newly promoted to the Women's First League. At the end of the season, her team was promoted to the Turkish Super League.

After playing two seasons for Bornova Hitab, she transferred to the Diyarbakır-based Amed in September 2025.

== International career ==
Ugochi has represented Nigeria at under-17, under-20 and senior national team, nicknamed "Super Falcons".

Ugochi alongside 24 other players were selected by head coach, Bala Nkiyu to represent the Nigeria U-17 team at the 2014 FIFA U-17 Women's World Cup in Costa Rica.

She didn't make the squad list for Nigeria in the 2018 Africa Women Cup of Nations.

In April 2019, Ugochi alongside Rofiat Sule, Osarenoma Igbinovia and 23 other players were selected by head coach, Thomas Dennerby to represent Nigeria at the West African Football Union Women's Cup in Abidjan.

She was among the players picked to represent Nigeria in the 2020 African Women's Olympic Games.

== Honours ==
Turkish First League

Bornova Hitab
Runners-up (1): 2023–24
