= Sona Rahimova =

Azerbaijani footballer (born 2001)

Personal information
- Date of birth: 14 July 2001 (age 25)
- Positions: Midfielder; forward

Team information
- Current team: Amed SFK
- Number: 27

Senior career*
Years	Team	Apps	(Gls)
- 8 – İOEUGiM
2021–2022	Kayseri Women's FC	6	(1)
2022–	Amed SFK	14	(0)

International career^{‡}
2016–2018	Azerbaijan U17	8	(0)
2018–2019	Azerbaijan U19	6	(0)
2020–	Azerbaijan	1	(0)
- * Club domestic league appearances and goals as of 29 January 2023 ‡ National team caps and goals as of 23 October 2020

Sona Rahimova (Azerbaijani: Sona Rəhimova; born 14 July 2001) is an Azerbaijani footballer, who plays as a midfielder and a forward for Amed SFK in the Turkish Women's Super League and the Azerbaijan women's national team.

== Club career ==
By December 2021, she moved to Turkey and joined Kayseri Women's FC to play in the 2021–22 Women's Super League. On 6 September 2022, she left Turkey. In October 2022, she returned to Turkey again, and joined the Diyarbakır-based club Amed SFK.

== See also ==
- List of Azerbaijan women's international footballers
