= Jacquette Ada =

Cameroonian footballer (born 1991)

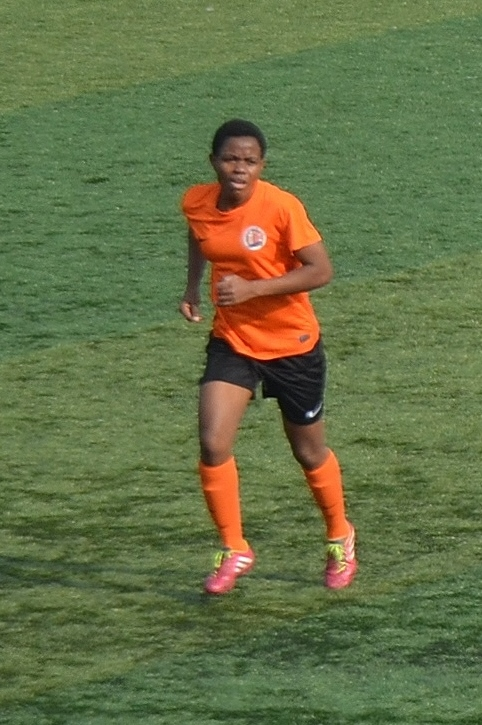
- Jacquette Ada playing for 1207 Antalyaspor

Personal information
- Date of birth: 27 August 1991 (age 35)
- Place of birth: Assok I, Cameroon
- Height: 1.62 m (5 ft 4 in)
- Position: Forward

Senior career*
Years	Team	Apps	(Gls)
2015–2016	1207 Antalyaspor	18	(15)
2016–2018	Beşiktaş	39	(18)
2018–2019	Amed	11	(3)
2021–2022	Fatih Vatan Spor	22	(6)
2022–	Ataşehir Belediyespor	8	(2)

International career
- Cameroon
- * Club domestic league appearances and goals as of 11 December 2022

Jacquette Ada (born 27 August 1991) is a Cameroonian football forward, who last played for Ataşehir Belediyespor in the Turkish Women's Super League. She is a member of the Cameroon women's national team.

== Club career ==
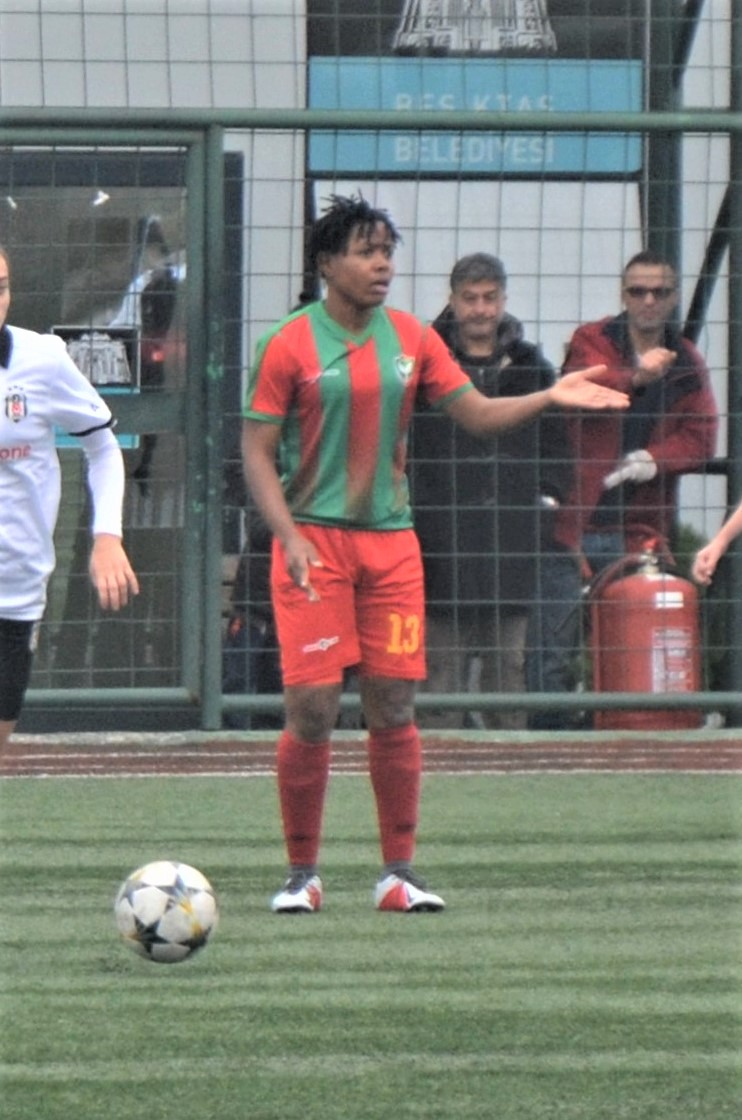
Jacquette Ada of Amed S.K. in the 2018–19 Turkish Women's First League

She played before for the Cameroonian clubs Femina Stars d'Ebolowa and Lorema FC (women).

In September 2015, she signed with 1207 Antalya Muratpaşa Belediye Spor in Antalya, which was newly promoted to the Women's First League.

In the 2016–17 season, Ada transferred to the newly promoted Beşiktaş J.K.

Returned home, she played for the Guinness Super League club Eclair FC of SA. For the 2021–22 Turkish Super League season, she went to Turkey, again and signed a one-season contract with Fatih Vatan Spor in Istanbul. The next season, she transferred to Ataşehir Belediyespor. On 2 January 2023, she returned home.

== International career ==
She is a member of the Cameroonian national team.

== Career statistics ==
As of match played 11 December 2022.

Club	Season	League			Continental		National		Total	
Club	Season	Division	Apps	Goals	Apps	Goals	Apps	Goals	Apps	Goals
1207 Antalyaspor	2015–16	First League	18	15	–	–			18	15
1207 Antalyaspor	Total		18	15	–	–			18	15
Beşiktaş J.K.	2016–17	First League	21	10	–	–			21	10
Beşiktaş J.K.	2017–18	First League	18	8	–	–			18	8
Beşiktaş J.K.	Total		39	18	–	–			39	18
Amed S.K.	2018–19	First League	11	3	–	–			11	3
Amed S.K.	Total		11	3	–	–			11	3
Fatih Vatan Spor	2021–22	Super League	22	6	–	–			22	6
Fatih Vatan Spor	Total		22	6	–	–			22	6
Ataşehir Belediyespor	2022–23	Super League	8	2	–	–			8	2
Ataşehir Belediyespor	Total		8	2	–	–			8	2
Career total			98	44	–	–			98	44

== Honours ==
Turkish Women's First League

Beşiktaş J.K.
Runners-up (2): 2016–17, 2017–18
