= Michaela Koutouan =

Ivorian footballer

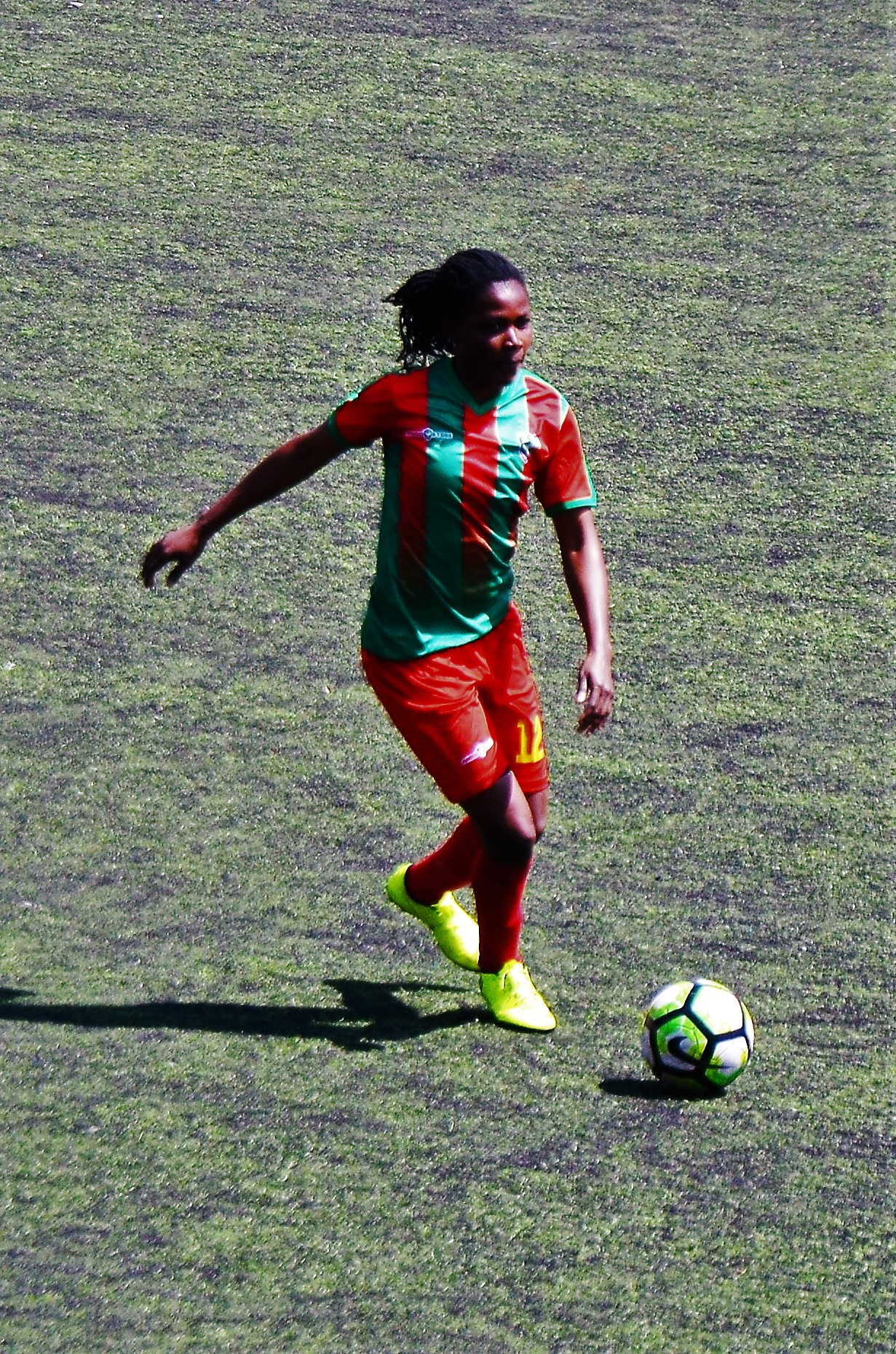
- Michaela Koutouan of Amed S.K. (April 2018)

Personal information
- Full name: Chacoum Stanie Michaela Koutouan
- Date of birth: 29 October 1990 (age 36)
- Place of birth: Man, Ivory Coast
- Position: Defender

Senior career*
Years	Team	Apps	(Gls)
2018–2019	Amed S.K.	15	(0)

International career^{‡}
2014	Ivory Coast	1	(0)
- * Club domestic league appearances and goals as of 28 April 2019 ‡ National team caps and goals as of 11 October 2014

Chacoum Stanie Michaela Koutouan (born 29 October 1990), shortly Michaela Koutouan, is an Ivorian women's football defender. She played in the Turkish Women's First League for Amed S.K.. She was a member of the Ivory Coast women's national team.

== Playing career ==
=== Club ===
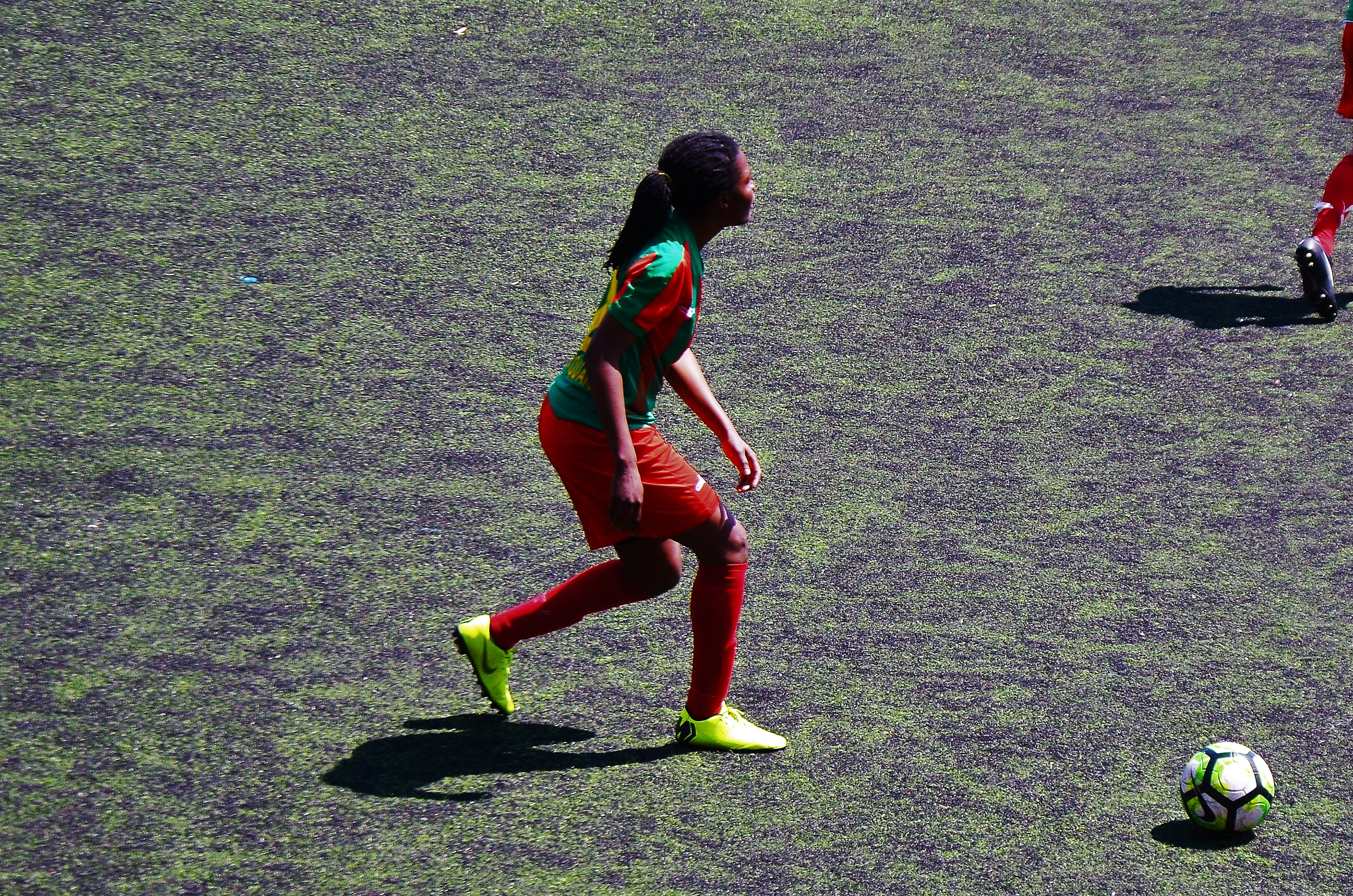
Michaela Koutouan playing for [[]Amed S.K. (women)|Amed S.K.]]] in the 2018–19 Turkish Women's First Football League.

Koutouan played in her country for Stella Club d'Adjamé. In October 2018, she moved to Turkey and joined the Diyarbakır-based club Amed S.K. to play in the Women's First League.

=== International ===
Koutouan was a member of the Ivory Coast women's national team, and took part in one of the three the 2014 African Women's Championship – Group A matches held in Namibia.

== Career statistics ==
As of match played April 28, 2019.

Club	Season	League			Continental		National		Total	
Club	Season	Division	Apps	Goals	Apps	Goals	Apps	Goals	Apps	Goals
Amed S.K.	2018–19	First League	15	0	–	–	0	0	15	0
Amed S.K.	Total		15	0	–	–	0	0	15	0

== See also ==
- List of Ivory Coast women's international footballers
