= Madison Less =

American soccer player (born 1998)

Personal information
- Full name: Madison Abigail Less
- Date of birth: April 27, 1998 (age 28)
- Place of birth: Hinckley, Ohio, United States
- Position: Goalkeeper

Team information
- Current team: Fatih Karagümrük S.K.
- Number: 12

College career
Years	Team	Apps	(Gls)
2016–2021	Cincinnati Bearcats		

Senior career*
Years	Team	Apps	(Gls)
2021	Ambassadors Cleveland		
2021–2022	BIIK Shymkent		
2022	FC Gintra		
2023–	Fatih Karagümrük S.K.	13	(0)
- * Club domestic league appearances and goals

Madison Abigail Less (born April 27, 1998) is an American professional soccer player, who plays as a goalkeeper for Fatih Karagümrük S.K. in the Turkish Women's Football Super League.

== Club career ==
During her university years, Less played in the college soccer team Cincinnati Bearcats. She also played for Cleveland Ambassadors in the Women's Premier Soccer League.

She joined BIIK Shymkent in the Kazakhstani women's football championship in July 2021. She took part in two qualifying stage matches of the Tournament 2 at the 2021–22 UEFA Women's Champions League. She left the club in June 2022.

In July 2022, she transferred to the Lithuanian Women's A League club FC Gintra. She played in two qualifying stage matches of the Tournament 5 at the 2022–23 UEFA Women's Champions League. In December 2022, she left the club.

In August 2023, she moved to Turkey and joined the Istanbul-based club Fatih Karagümrük S.K. to play in the Super League.

== Personal life ==
Madison Abigail Less was born in Hinckley, Ohio, United States on April 27, 1998.

Starting in 2016, Less studied Business Administration at the Carl H. Lindner College of Business of the University of Cincinnati. In 2020, she graduated with a BBA degree in accounting. She continued her studies, and earned an MBA title in 2021. She is a Certified Public Accountant (CPA).
