= Gunay İsmayilova =

Azerbaijani footballer (born 1998)

Gunay Ismayilova
Personal information
- Date of birth: 8 March 1998 (age 28)
- Place of birth: Azerbaijan
- Height: 1.72 m (5 ft 8 in)
- Position: Goalkeeper

Team information
- Current team: Amed
- Number: 1

Senior career*
Years	Team	Apps	(Gls)
- Fidan F.C.
2017–2018	Beşiktaş	6	(0)
2018	Kireçburnu Spor	9	(0)
2022–	Amed	14	(0)

International career
	Azerbaijan	1	(0)
- * Club domestic league appearances and goals as of 29 January 2023

Gunay Ismayilova (Azerbaijani: Günay İsmayılova; born 8 March 1998) is an Azerbaijani footballer who plays as a goalkeeper for Turkish Women's Super League clud Amed and the Azerbaijan women's national team.

== Club career ==
İsmayilova played in her country for Fidan F.C. By November 2017, she moved to Turkey, and signed a six-month deal with the Women's First League club Beliktaş J.K. In the second half of the 2017–18 First League, she transferred to Kireçburnu Spor. In November 2021, she left Turkey. Mid October 2022, she moved to Turkey again, and joined the Diyarbakır-based club Amed SFK to play in the 2022–23 Super Leafue. In November 2021, she left Turkey.

== International career ==
She is a member of the Azerbaijan women's national football team.
