= Camila Santos =

Brazilian footballer (born 2000)

Personal information
- Full name: Camila dos Santos Costa
- Date of birth: 22 September 2000 (age 26)
- Place of birth: Brazil
- Height: 1.65 m (5 ft 5 in)
- Position: Defender

Team information
- Current team: Amed
- Number: 6

Senior career*
Years	Team	Apps	(Gls)
	Lusaca	4	(0)
2018	São Francisco-BA	7	(0)
2019–2020	União Desportiva AL	10	(0)
2021–2022	São José	19	(0)
2023	Fatih Vatan	7	(0)
2023–2024	Beylerbeti	8	(0)
2024–	Amed	31	(2)
- * Club domestic league appearances and goals as of 4 May 2025

Camila dos Santos Costa (born 22 September 2000) is a Brazilian professional women's football defender who plays in the Turkish Super League for Amed.

== Club career ==
Santos is 1.65 m (5 ft 5 in) tall, and plays as a left-footer in the left-back defender position.

=== Brazil ===
Santos played in the beginning for Lusaca in the Women's championship in the State Bahia.

In 2018, she transferred to São Francisco-BA, and appeared in seven games of the second-level League A2.

The next season, she joined União Desportiva AL. She capped ten times in two seasons of the Leage A2.

In 2021, she moved to São José in the State São Paulo to play in the top Brazilian professional league Women's Championship A1, where she appeared in 34 matches in two seasons.

=== Turkey ===
By February 2023, Santos moved to Turkey, and signed with the Istanbul-based club Fatih Vatan to play in the second half of the 2022-23 Super League season. She appeared in seven matches. The next season, she transferred to Beylerbeyi in Istanbul. She played eight matches in the first half of the 2023-24 Super League season. In the second half of the seaspn, she joined the Diyarbakır-based club Amed.

== Career statistics ==
As of match played 4 May 2025.

Club	Season	League			Continental		National		Total	
Club	Season	Division	Apps	Goals	Apps	Goals	Apps	Goals	Apps	Goals
Fatih Vatan	2022–23	Turkish Super League	7	0	–	–			7	0
Beylerbeyi	2023–24	Turkish Super League	8	0	–	–			8	0
Amed	2023–24	Turkish Super League	10	1	–	–			10	1
Amed	2024–25	Turkish Super League	21	1	–	–			21	1
Amed	Total		31	2	–	–			31	2
