= Angelina Portnova =

Kazakhstani footballer

Personal information
- Date of birth: 10 February 2001 (age 25)
- Place of birth: Shardara, Kazakhstan
- Height: 1.76 m (5 ft 9 in)
- Position: Goalkeeper

Senior career*
Years	Team	Apps	(Gls)
2018–2021	Okzhetpes		
2019	→ SDYuSShOR-8 Nursultan (loan)		
2021	SDYuSShOR-8 Nursultan		
2021–2023	Adana İdman Yurdu	31	(0)
2023–2024	Okzhetpes		
2024	Hakkarigücü	15	(0)
2024	Nike Lusso		
2025	Amed	8	(0)
2026	Asteras Tripolis	1	(0)

International career^{‡}
2017–2018	Kazakhstan U19	5	(0)
2021–	Kazakhstan	16	(0)
- * Club domestic league appearances and goals as of 31 May 2026 ‡ National team caps and goals as of 30 January 2026

Angelina Portnova (Russian: Ангелина Валерьевна Портнова, born 10 February 2001) is a Kazakhstani footballer who plays as a goalkeeper for Amed in the Turkish Women's Super League and the Kazakhstan women's national team.

== Personal life ==
Born on 10 February 2001, Angelina Portnova is a native of Astana (now Nursultan) in Kazakhstan.

== Club career ==
Portnova has played for SDYuSShOR-8 Nursultan in Astana, Kazakhstan.

Mid December 2021, she moved to Turkey to join the Super League club Adana İdmanyurduspor. She awitched over to Hakkarigücü Spor in January 2024, in the mid of the 2023–24 Super League season. She transferred in the second half ogf the 2024–25 Super League season to Amed in Diyarbakır.

== International career ==
Portnova made her senior debut for Kazakhstan on 12 June 2021 in a 1–2 friendly away loss to Armenia.

== Career statistics ==
As of match played 4 May 2025.

Club	Season	League			Continental		National		Total	
Club	Season	Division	Apps	Goals	Apps	Goals	Apps	Goals	Apps	Goals
Adana İdman Yurdu	2021–22	Turkish Super League	22	0	–	–			22	0
Adana İdman Yurdu	2022–23	Turkish Super League	9	0	–	–			9	0
Adana İdman Yurdu	Total		31	0	–	–			31	0
Hakkarigücü	2023–24	Turkish Super League	15	0	–	–			15	0
Amed	2024–25	Turkish Super League	8	0	–	–			8	0
