= Hannah Reynolds (soccer) =

American soccer player

Personal information
- Full name: Hannah Elizabeth Reynolds
- Date of birth: May 25, 1998 (age 28)
- Place of birth: Seattle, Washington, U.S.
- Height: 5 ft 7 in (1.70 m)
- Position: Winger

Team information
- Current team: Kdz. Ereğli Belediye Spor
- Number: 15

Youth career
- University Preparatory Academy
- Eastside FC 96 Red

College career
Years	Team	Apps	(Gls)
2015–2017	Tufts Jumbos	6	(0)

Senior career*
Years	Team	Apps	(Gls)
2022	Hatayspor	8	(2)
2023–	Kdz. Ereğli Belediye Spor	4	(0)
- * Club domestic league appearances and goals as of January 29, 2023

Hannah Elizabeth Reynolds (born May 25, 1998) is an American professional soccer player who plays for Kdz. Ereğli Belediye Spor in the Turkish Women's Football Super League.

== Early life ==
Hannah Elizabeth Reynolds was born to George and Sara Reynolds in Seattle, Washington, on May 25, 1998. She has three elder sisters, Katherine, Elizabeth, and Jen. Katherine is also a professional soccer player.

== Youth career ==
Reynolds played soccer during her high school years at University Preparatory Academy. She then joined Eastside FC 96 Red in Issaquah, Washington. While playing for Eastside FC 96 Red U15, she was named a member of the "Pacific Northwest Team of the Month for August" by TopDrawerSoccer.com in 2011. She took part at the 2015 US Youth Soccer Region IV Championships. Reynolds won three state champion titles with University Prep. During her college years, she played for the Tufts Jumbos, an NCAA Division III team.

== Club career ==
In October 2022, Reynolds moved to Turkey and signed with Hatayspor to play in the Women's Super League. After scoring 2 goals in 8 matches, she transferred to Kdz. Ereğli Belediye Spor in the second half of the 2022–23 Super League season.
