= Nino Chkuaseli =

Georgian women's football goalkeeper

Personal information
- Full name: ნინო ჭკუასელი
- Date of birth: 22 September 1988 (age 38)
- Place of birth: Soviet Union (now Georgia)
- Position: Goalkeeper

Senior career*
Years	Team	Apps	(Gls)
- Dinamo Tbilisi
2010–2013	Trabzon İdmanocağı	55	(0)

International career^{‡}
2005–	Georgia U-19	4	(0)
–2013	Georgia	5	(0)
- * Club domestic league appearances and goals as of 21 April 2013 ‡ National team caps and goals as of 9 April 2013

Nino Chkuaseli (Georgian: ნინო ჭკუასელი, born September 22, 1988) is a Georgian women's football goalkeeper. Between 2010 and 2013, she played in the Turkish Women's First Football League for Trabzon İdmanocağı with jersey number 22. She is a member of the Georgia women's national football team.

== Playing career ==
=== Club ===
Chkuaseli played for Dinamo Tbilisi before she transferred to Trabzon İdmanocağı in Turkey. She capped 55 times in three seasons from 2010 to 2013 for the Trabzon-based team.

She took part at the 2007–08 UEFA Women's Cup – Group A7 (forerunner of the UEFA Women's Champions League) playing in three matches for the Georgian club Dinamo Tbilisi.

=== International ===
She made her international debut with the Georgia women's U-19 team appearing in the UEFA European Women's Under-19 Championship (First qualifying round) against Russia on September 29, 2005.

With the Georgia women's national team, she took part at the 2015 FIFA Women's World Cup qualification (UEFA) – Group B matches.

== Career statistics ==
As of match played April 21, 2013.

Club	Season	League			Continental		National		Total	
Club	Season	Division	Apps	Goals	Apps	Goals	Apps	Goals	Apps	Goals
Trabzon İdmanocağı	2010–11	First League	20	0	–	–			20	0
Trabzon İdmanocağı	2011–12	First League	20	0	–	–			20	0
Trabzon İdmanocağı	2012–13	First League	15	0	–	–			15	0
Trabzon İdmanocağı	Total		55	0	–	–			55	0

== Honours ==
Turkish Women's First League

Trabzon İdmanocağı
Third places (1): 2011–12
