= Chidinma Favour Edeji =

Nigerian footballer

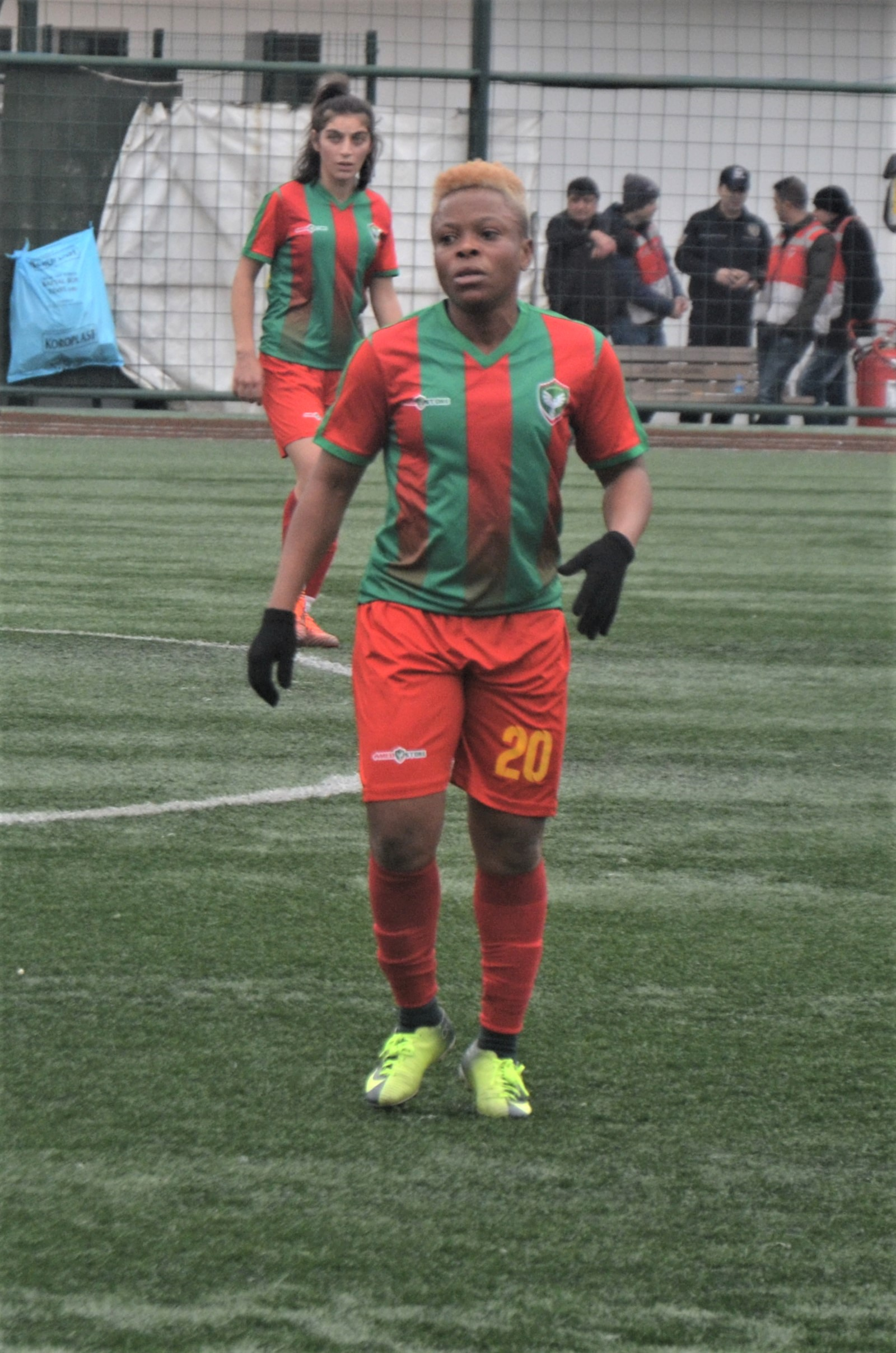
- ChidinmaFavourEdeji (2).jpg of Amed S.K. (December 2018)

Personal information
- Date of birth: 15 December 1995 (age 30)
- Place of birth: Ngor Okpala, Nigeria
- Position: Midfielder

Senior career*
Years	Team	Apps	(Gls)
2018–2019	Amed S.K.	16	(0)

International career
2012	Nigeria U-17	2	(0)
2017	Nigeria		
- * Club domestic league appearances and goals as of 28 April 2019

Chidinma Favour Edeji // (born 15 December 1995) is a Nigerian football midfielder. She played in the Turkish Women's First Football League for Amed S.K. wearing jersey number 20. She is a member of the Nigeria women's national team.

== Playing career ==
=== Club ===
Edeji played in the Nigeria Women Premier League for the Yenagoa-based club Bayelsa Queens F.C. The midfielder, who stands at 142 cm (4 ft 8 in) tall, was also part of the Treasure Coast Dynamites of Port St. Lucie, Florida, playing in the 2017 Women's Premier Soccer League.

In October 2018, she made a move to Turkey, joining the Diyarbakır-based club Amed S.K. to compete in the Turkish Women's First Football League.

=== International ===
Edeji was a member of the Nigeria girls' U-17 team, and played in one of the three the 2012 FIFA U-17 Women's World Cup matches held in Azerbaijan. She took part in a match against France in October 2012.

== Career statistics ==
As of match played 28 April 2019.

Club	Season	League			Continental		National		Total	
Club	Season	Division	Apps	Goals	Apps	Goals	Apps	Goals	Apps	Goals
Amed S.K.	2018–19	First League	16	0	–	–	0	0	16	0
Amed S.K.	Total		16	0	–	–	0	0	16	0
