= Serenay =

Serenay is a Turkish feminine name. Notable people with the name include:

- Serenay Aktaş (born 1993), Turkish former women's footballer, and television and film actress
- Serenay Öziri (born 1994), Turkish women's footballer
- Serenay Sarıkaya (born 1992), Turkish actress and model

== See also ==
- Serena (disambiguation)
