= Kamaté =

Kamaté is a surname. Notable people with the surname include:

- Dramane Kamaté (born 1985), Ivorian footballer
- Fanta Zara Kamaté (born 1995), Ivorian footballer
- Issiaka Kamate (born 2004), French footballer
