= Saira Posada =

Spanish footballer (born 1998)

Personal information
- Full name: Saira Posada Garreta
- Date of birth: 29 January 1998 (age 28)
- Place of birth: Cádiz, Spain
- Height: 1.64 m (5 ft 4 1/2 in)
- Position: Midfielder

Team information
- Current team: Fatih Vatan
- Number: 10

Youth career
- 2016–2017: Sevilla Juvenil

Senior career*
Years	Team	Apps	(Gls)
2017–2018	Sevilla		
2018–2019	Híspalis		
2019–2020	Santa Teresa		
2020–2021	Cádiz		
2022–2024	AaB		
2024–	Fatih Vatan	7	(0)
- * Club domestic league appearances and goals as of 23 November 2024

Saira Posada Garreta (born 21 January 1998) is a Spanish women's football midfielder who plays in the Turkish Super League for Fatih Vatan.

== Personal life ==
Saira Posada Garreta was born in Cádiz, Spain on 21 January 1998.

== Club career ==
Posada is 1.64 m (5 ft 4 1/2 in) tall. She plays as a midfielder.

=== Spain ===
After playing in the 2016–17 season for the Sevilla youth team, Posada was promoted by July 2017 to Sevilla A team to play in the 2017–18 Primera División. By July 2018, she transferred to Híspalis in the same city, and played in the 2018–19 Segunda División. For the 2019–20 Segunda División Pro season, she signed by January 2020 with Santa Teresa in Badajoz. By July 2020, she joined her hometown club Cádiz., which play in the Primera RFEF Group 2.

=== Denmark ===
By July 2022, she went to Denmark, and signed a deal with AaB. She scored eight goals in that season. After spending the summer holiday at home in Spain, she returned to Denmark. By August 2023, her club extended her contract. She played two seasons in the Elitedivisionen. She appeared in 32 matches.

=== Turkey ===
In July 2024, she moved to Turkey, and joined the Istanbul-based club Fatih Vatan to play as a forward in the Super League.
