= Opal Curless =

American soccer player (born 1998)

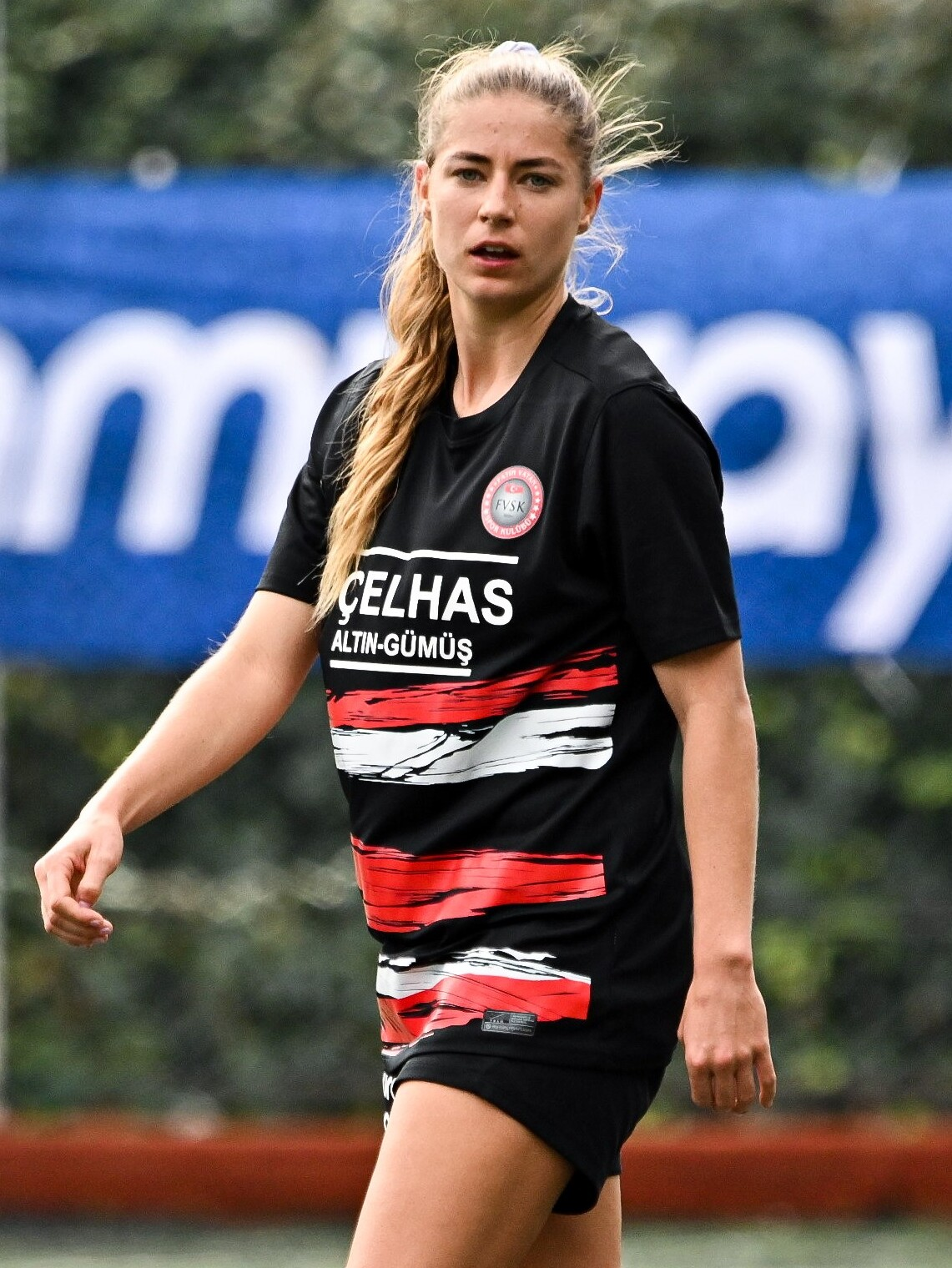
- Curless with Fatih Vatan Spor in 2024

Personal information
- Full name: Opal Courtney Curless
- Date of birth: May 18, 1998 (age 28)
- Place of birth: Mount Desert Island, Maine, United States
- Height: 5 ft 8 in (1.73 m)
- Positions: Defender; midfielder

Youth career
- Mount Desert Island HS
- FC Stars

College career
Years	Team	Apps	(Gls)
2016–2017	Syracuse Orange	35	(0)
2018–2019	Florida Gulf Coast Eagles	36	(0)

Senior career*
Years	Team	Apps	(Gls)
2020–2021	MTK Hungária		
2022–2023	Valadares Gaia	44	(2)
2024	Fatih Vatan Spor	12	(0)
2024–2025	Cruz Azul	24	(0)
2025–	Marseille	0	(0)
- * Club domestic league appearances and goals as of August 17, 2025

Opal Courtney Curless (born May 18, 1998) is an American professional soccer player who plays as a defender.

== Early years ==
Curless is 5 ft 8 in (1.73 m) tall at 58 kg (128 lb), and plays as a defender or midfielder.

She was a member of the school team during her secondary education at Mount Desert Island High School in her hometown, and was named Maine Gatorade Player of the Year in 2016, and also was selected to the All-New England Team. In 2014, she was part of Black Bear United and Acadia Fire FC. She also played for the local club FC Stars.

She played college soccer at Syracuse Orange for the 2016 and 2017 seasons. She transferred to Florida Gulf Coast Eagles, playing there for two years. She played in 36 matches for Florida Gulf Coast.

== Club career ==
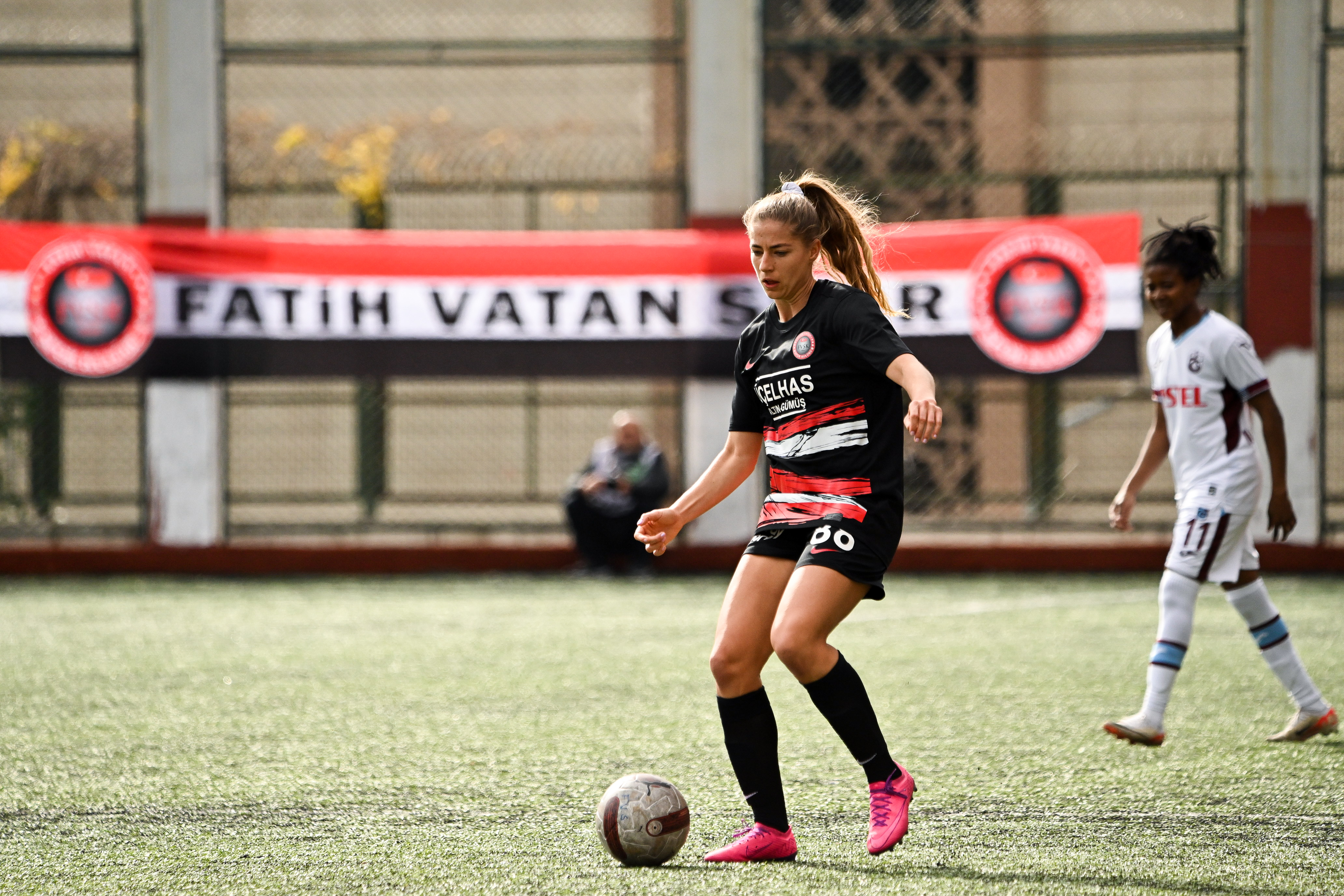
Opal Curless playing for Fatih Vatan Spor in the 2023-24 Turkish Super League.

In July 2020, Curless traveled to Hungary and started her professional soccer career, playing for Budapest-based club MTK Hungária in the Női NB I. She left the club at the end of 2021.

On January 1, 2022, she went to Portugal to play for Valadares Gaia in the 2021–22 season of the Liga BPI. She remained there for the next season. She scored two goals in 44 matches played. She also took part in the Taça de Portugal and Taça da Liga Feminina matches. Her last appearance was on January 7, 2024.

In the beginning of February 2024, she moved to Turkey and signed a deal with the Istanbul-based club Fatih Vatan Spor to play until the end of the second half of the 2023–24 Women's Super League. She appeared in 12 matches.

== International career ==
Curless was called up to the U.S. girls' U-14 team training camp in 2012 held in Carson, California.

== Personal life ==
Opal Courtney Curless was born to Michael and Abigail Curless in Mount Desert Island, Maine. She has a brother, Audyn.

After graduating from Mount Desert Island High School in Bar Harbor, Maine in 2016, she started her collegiate career at Syracuse University before transferring to Florida Gulf Coast University and majoring in psychology.

She announced her engagement to footballer Christina Burkenroad in June 21, 2026.
