= Almina Hodžić =

Bosnia and Herzegovina footballer

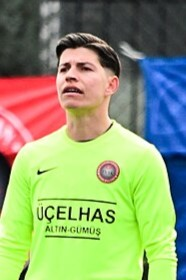
- Almina Hodžić of Fatih Vatan Spor in the 2023-24 Turkish Women's Football Super League

Personal information
- Date of birth: 2 November 1988 (age 38)
- Position: Goalkeeper

Team information
- Current team: SFK 2000
- Number: 12

Senior career*
Years	Team	Apps	(Gls)
- SFK 2000
2023–2024	Ataşehir Belediyespor	14	(0)
2024–	Fatih Vatan Spor	5	(0)

International career^{‡}
- Bosnia and Herzegovina
- * Club domestic league appearances and goals as of 17 February 2024 ‡ National team caps and goals as of 19:27, 30 August 2019 (UTC)

Almina Hodžić (born 2 November 1988) is a Bosnian footballer who plays as a goalkeeper and has appeared for the Bosnia and Herzegovina women's national team.

== Club career ==
End August 2023, Hodžić moved to Turkey and signed with Ataşehir Belediyespor to play in the 2023–24 Super League season. After capping in 14 matches for ATaşehir Belediyespor, she transferred to Fatih Vatan Spor mid January 2024 for the second half of the season.

== International career ==
Hodžić has been capped for the Bosnia and Herzegovina national team, appearing for the team during the 2019 FIFA Women's World Cup qualifying cycle.
