= Amani Ayed =

Swedish-Tunisian footballer (born 2006)

Personal information
- Date of birth: 28 December 2006 (age 19)
- Place of birth: Hässelby, Stockholm, Sweden
- Height: 1.61 m (5 ft 3 in)
- Position: Midfielder

Team information
- Current team: Sultanbeyli Gücü
- Number: 55

Youth career
- 2021–2023: Brommapojkarna
- 2024–2025: AIK

Senior career*
Years	Team	Apps	(Gls)
2026	Sollentuna		
2026–	Sultanbeyli Gücü	9	(3)

International career
2025–	Tunisia		
- * Club domestic league appearances and goals as of 1 November 2026

Amani Ayed (Arabic: أماني عايد; born 28 December 2006) is a footballer who currently plays as a midfielder for Turkish Women's Super League club Sultanbeyli Gücü. Born in Sweden, she represents Tunisia at international level.

== Club career ==
Ayed played in Sweden for the U17 and U19 teams of Brommapojkarna and Fotboll Dam between 2021 and 2025. In the beginning of 2026, she transferred to Sollentuna FK.

Late August 2026, she moved to Turkey, and signed with the Istanbul-based club Sultanbeyli Gücü to play in the Women's Super League.

== International career ==
Ayed was part of the Tunisia women's national team at the 2024 Women's Africa Cup of Nationsheld in Morocco in July 2025.

== Personal life ==
Amani Ayed was born to Tunisian mother Thouraya Sakhri, on 28 December 2006 in the Hässelby neighborhood of Stockholm, Sweden. She has a two-year older brother Amir Ayed.
