= Fatih Mimar Sinan Stadium =

Football stadium in Istanbul, Turkey

Mimar Sinan Stadium
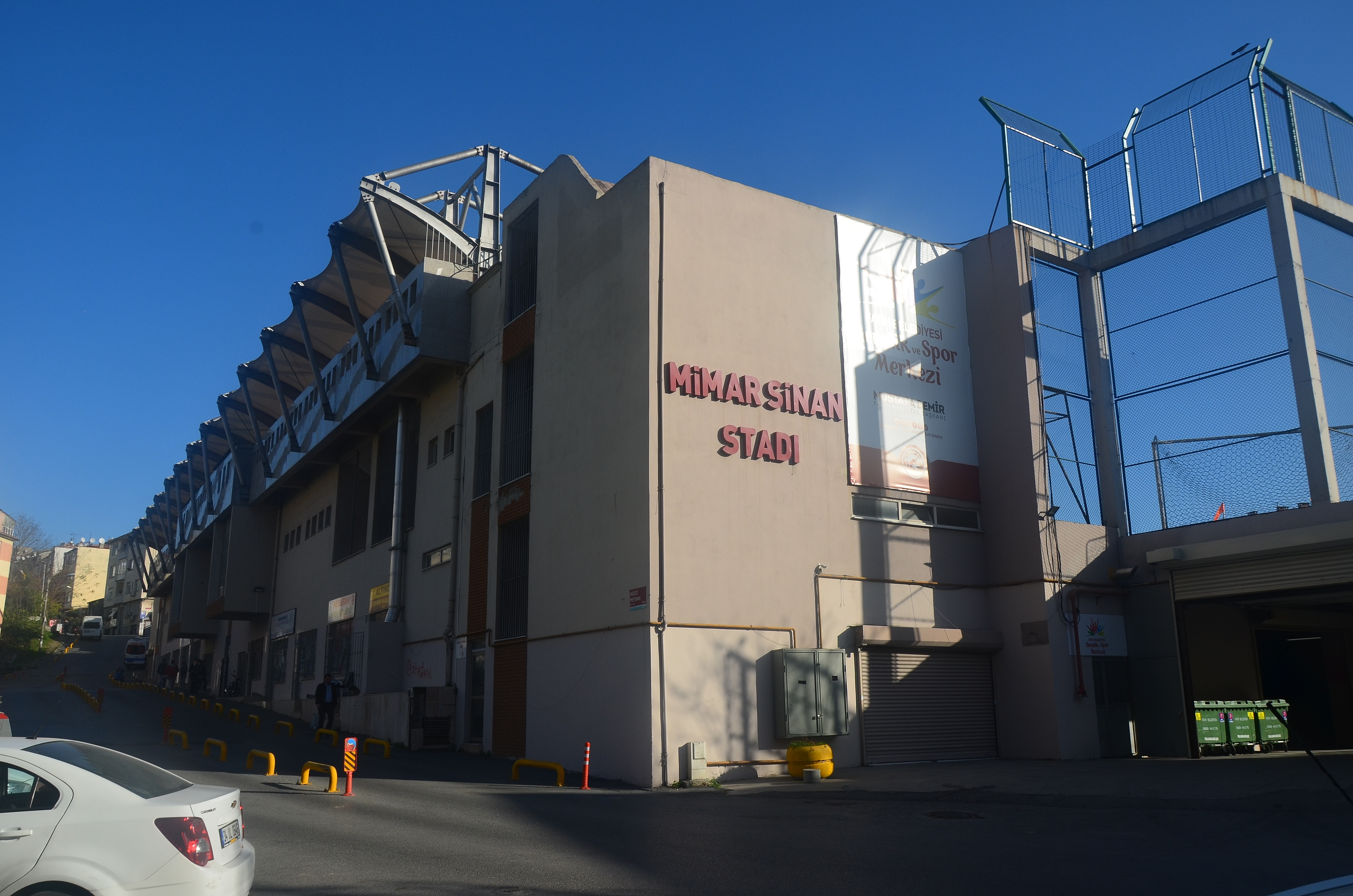

- Location of Mimar Sinan Stadium in Istanbul, Turkey
- Address: Karagümrük Mah., Keçeci Meydanı Sok. 4
- Location: Fatih, Istanbul, Turkey
- Coordinates: 41°01′26″N 28°56′03″E
- Owner: Fatih Municipality
- Operator: Fatih Municipality
- Capacity: 1,250
- Surface: Artificial turf

Construction
- Opened: 2011

Tenant
- Fatih Vatan Spor

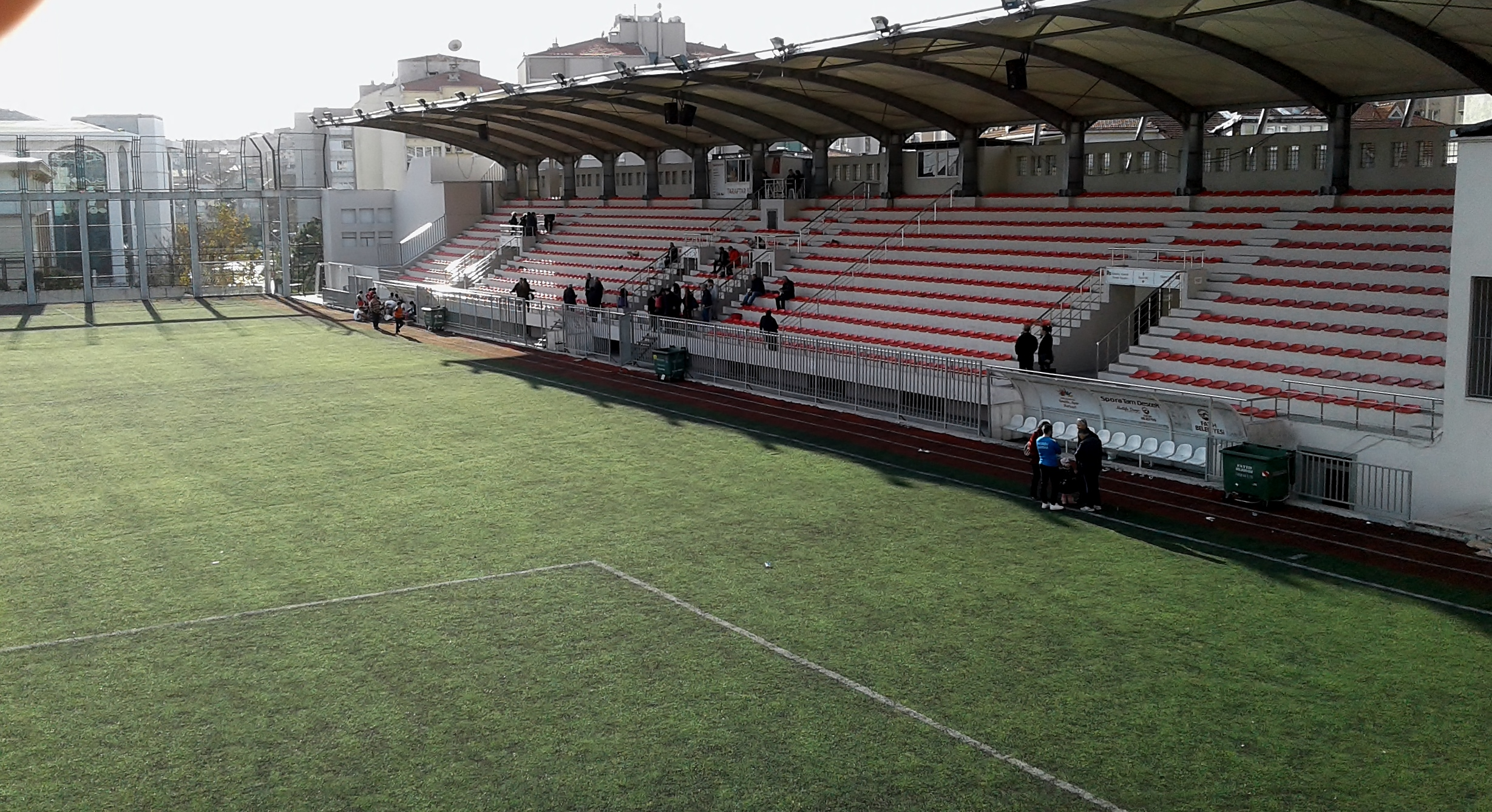
A view of Mimar Sinan Stadium.

Fatih Mimar Sinan Stadium (Turkish: Mimar Sinan Stadı) is a football stadium in the Fatih district of Istanbul, Turkey. It is named after the Ottoman chief architect Mimar Sinan (c. 1488/1490–1588).

The stadium is situated at Keçeci Meydanı Street in Karagümrük neighborhood of Fatih. Built in 2011, the venue is owned and operated by the Municipality of Fatih. The stadium has a capacity of 1,250 spectators including 20 seats for the press and 60 seats for VIP. The ground is covered by artificial turf, and it is equipped with floodlights for illumination.

The stadium is used mainly for football matches, and it is the home ground of some of the 42 amateur football clubs in the district, as well as of Fatih Vatan Spor women's football team. The venue and the Youth and Sports Center annexed also are allocated to events organized by the municipality, including summer sports schools, physical education and training of nearby schools, the annual "1453 Conquest Cup for Chess", and the traditional "Africa Football Cup and Festival" event held annually, at which citizens of more than 15 African countries living in the district take part.
