= Nargiz Aliyeva =

Azerbaijani footballer (born 2002)

Personal information
- Date of birth: 22 March 2002 (age 24)
- Place of birth: Mingachevir, Azerbaijan
- Height: 1.70 m (5 ft 7 in)
- Position: Goalkeeper

Team information
- Current team: Fatih Vatan
- Number: 67

Youth career
- 2013–2016: Mingachevir

Senior career*
Years	Team	Apps	(Gls)
2018	Baku City		
2019	Kesha		
2021–2022	Tbilisi Nike		
2021–2024	Kdz. Ereğli	55	(0)
2024–	Fatih Vatan	13	(0)

International career
2020–	Azerbaijan		
- * Club domestic league appearances and goals as of 15 Octoberber 2025

Nargiz Aliyeva (Azerbaijani: Nərgiz Əliyeva; born 22 March 2002) is an Azerbaijani women's football goalkeeper who plays in the Turkis Super League for Fatih Vatan, and the Azerbaijan women's national team.

== Early years ==
Aliyeeva started her sports career in 2013. She learned playing football under the tutelage of coach Ilgar Huseynov in her hometown. Her first club was Mingachevir, where she was a member until 2016.

== Club career ==
Aliyeva entered Baku City club in 2018. The next year, she transferred to Keshla.

In 2020, she moved to neighborhood country Georgie, and played for WFC Tbilisi Nike. After playing there for one season, she went to Turkey in December 2021, and signed a deal with Kdz. Ereğli to play in the 2021–22 Super League.

In September 2024, she transferred to the Istanbul-based club Fatih Varan.

== International career ==
Aliyeva was called up to the Azerbaijan women's national football team in March 2020. She took part in the UEFA Women's Euro 2022 qualifying Group D and the 2023 FIFA Women's World Cup qualification – UEFA Group E matches on the bench.
