= Lütfiye Ercimen =

Turkish footballer (born 1987)

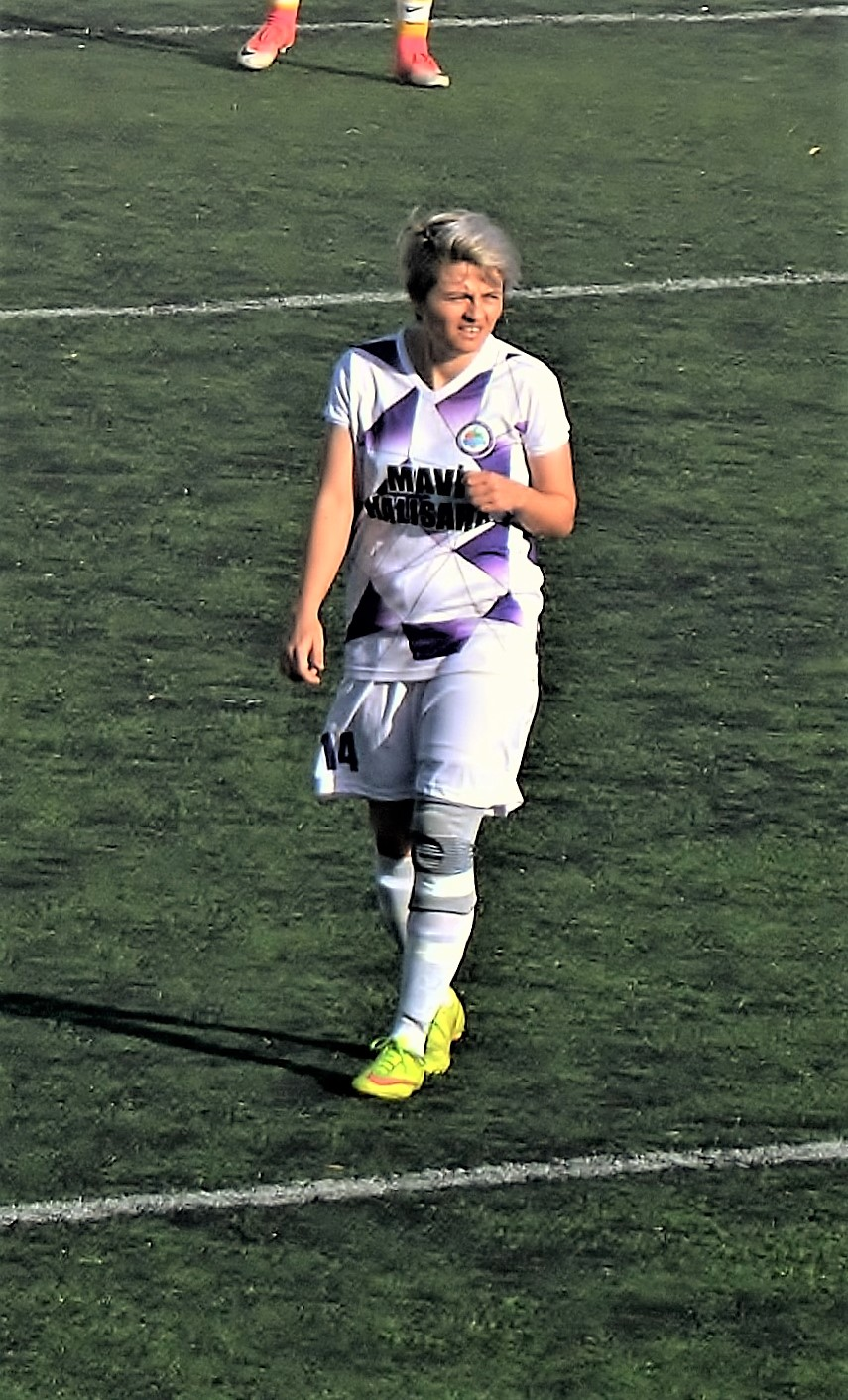
- Lütfiye Ercimen playing for Kdz. Ereğli Belediye Spor (December 2017).

Personal information
- Date of birth: October 5, 1987 (age 39)
- Place of birth: Gerede, Bolu Province, Turkey
- Position: Defender

Team information
- Current team: Kdz. Ereğli Belediye Spor
- Number: 14

Senior career*
Years	Team	Apps	(Gls)
2002–2010	Gazi Üniversitesispor	37	(38)
2010–2016	Ataşehir Belediyespor	96	(20)
2017	Kdz. Ereğli Belediye Spor	17	(0)
2018	Fatih Vatan Spor	7	(1)
2018–	Kdz. Ereğli Belediye Spor	31	(0)

International career^{‡}
2003	Turkey U-19	5	(0)
2006–2010	Turkey	18	(1)
- * Club domestic league appearances and goals as of March 8, 2020 ‡ National team caps and goals as of April 11, 2010

Lütfiye Ercimen (born October 5, 1987) is a Turkish women's football defender currently playing in the Turkish Women's First Football League for Kdz. Ereğli Belediye Spor with jersey number 14. She is a member of the Turkey women's national team since 2006.

== Early life ==
Lütfiye Ercimen was born in Gerede town of Bolu Province, Turkey on October 5, 1987.

== Club career ==
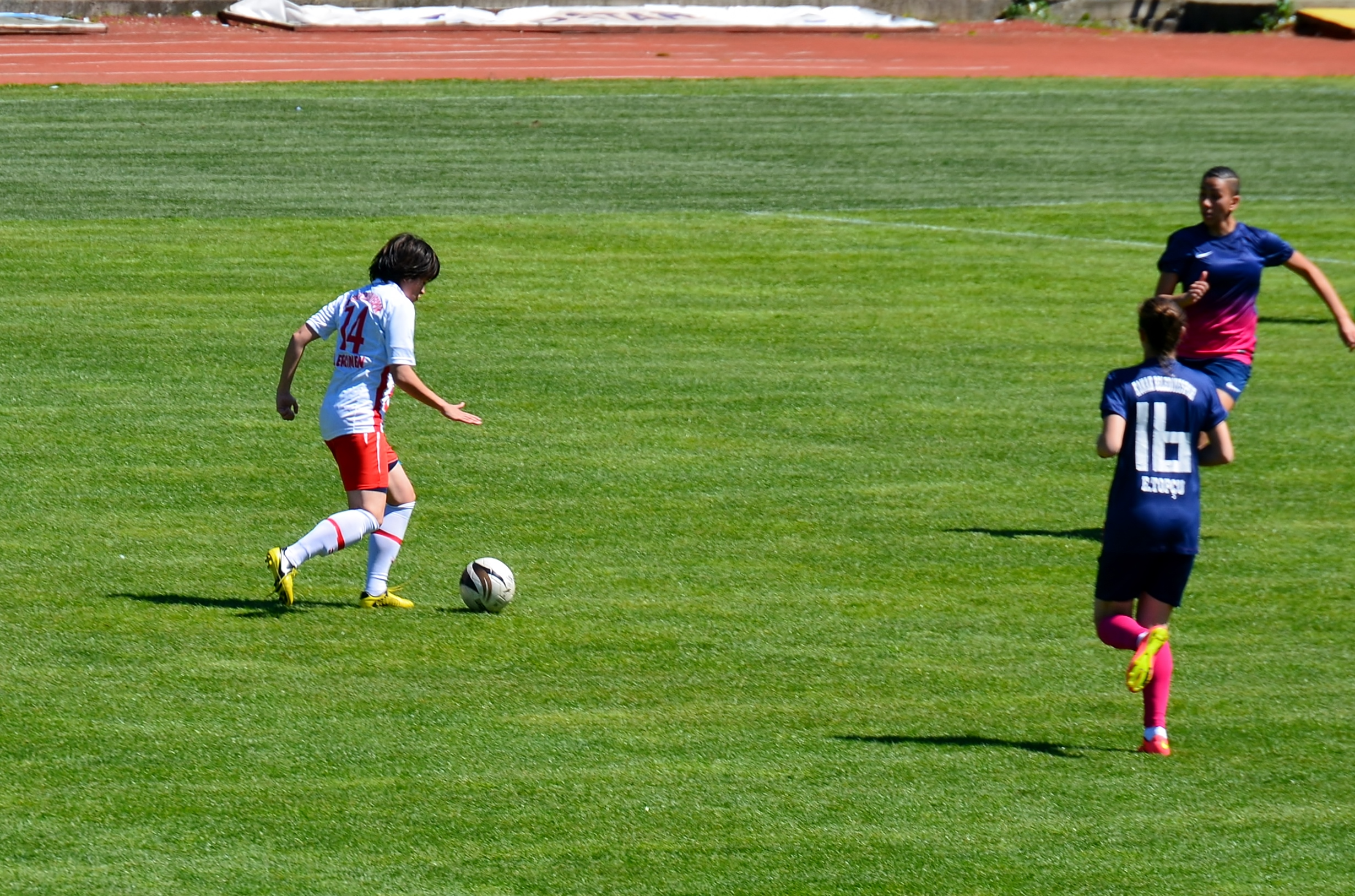
Lütfiye Ercimen (left) playing for Ataşehir Belediyespor in the 2014–15 First League.

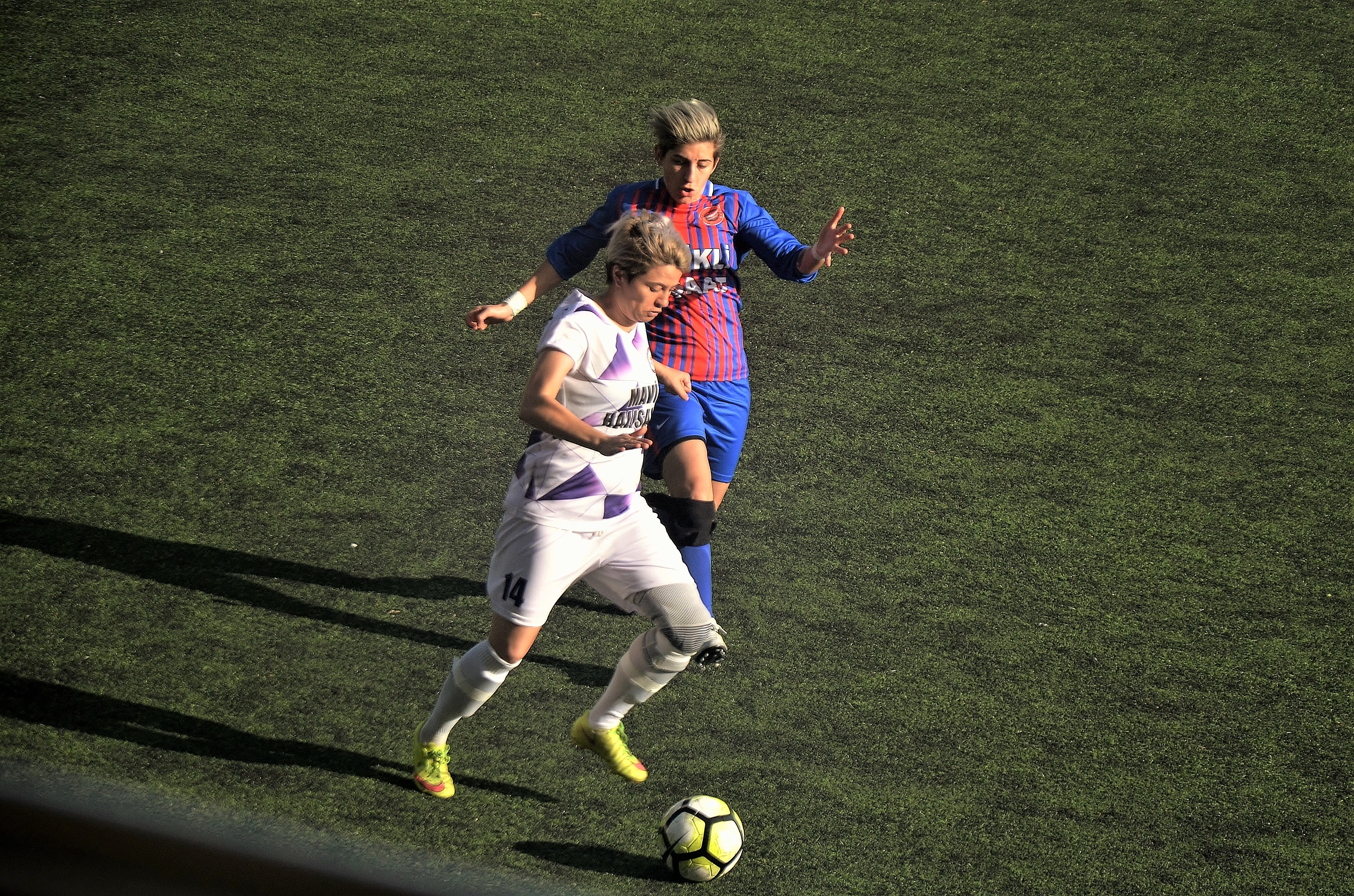
Lütfiye Ercimen (white) playing for Kdz. Ereğlispor in the 2017–18 First League.

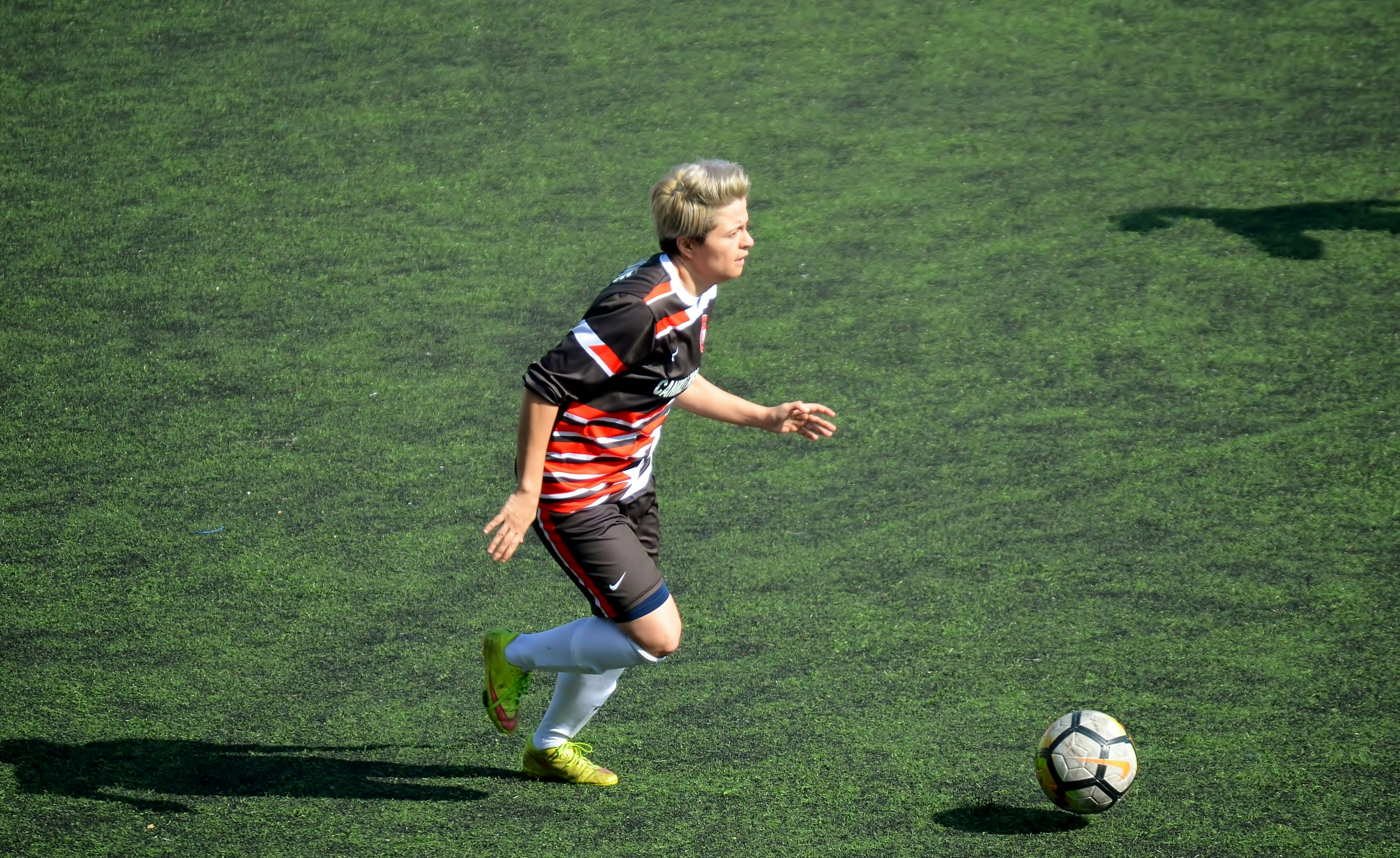
Lütfiye Ercimen playing for Fatih Vatan Spor in the 2017–18 First League.

Lütfiye Ercimen began playing football in the Ankara-based club Gazi Üniversitesispor after obtaining her license on February 28, 2002. She became three times Women's First League champion with her team, in 2007, 2008 and 2010.

In October 2010, she transferred to Ataşehir Belediyesi, where she plays since then. There, she continued her league championship in 2011 and 2012, three times consecutively.

She made her first appearance in the 2011–12 UEFA Women's Champions League – Group 4 qualifying round match playing against the Lithuanian team Gintra Universitetas on August 11, 2011. The next season, she took part again at the UEFA Women's Champions League qualification matches.

In the second half of the 2016–17 League season, she transferred to Kdz. Ereğlispor. In the beginning of the 2017–18 League, she signed for the Istanbul-based Fatih Vatan Spor.

In October 2018, she returned to her former club Kdz. Ereğlispor.

== International career ==
Ercimen made her national team debut in the 2004 UEFA Women's U-19 Championship First qualifying round match against Sweden women's national football team held on September 23, 2003. After playing five matches with the national U-19 team, she became a member of the senior team in 2006. As of September 19, 2012, she was capped 20 times in the national team scoring one goal.

== Career statistics ==
As of 8 March 2020.

Club	Season	League			Continental		National		Total	
Club	Season	Division	Apps	Goals	Apps	Goals	Apps	Goals	Apps	Goals
Gazi Üniversitesispor	2003–2008		4	2	–	–	12	1	16	23
Gazi Üniversitesispor	2008–09	First League	15	13	–	–	6	0	21	13
Gazi Üniversitesispor	2009–10	First	18	23	–	–	5	0	23	23
Gazi Üniversitesispor	Total		37	38	0	0	23	1	60	39
Ataşehir Belediyesi	2010–11	First League	20	14	–	–	0	0	20	14
Ataşehir Belediyesi	2011–12	First League	19	3	3	0	0	0	22	3
Ataşehir Belediyesi	2012–13	First League	16	0	3	0	0	0	19	0
Ataşehir Belediyesi	2013–14	First League	14	0	–	–	0	0	14	0
Ataşehir Belediyesi	2014–15	First League	12	0	–	–	0	0	12	0
Ataşehir Belediyesi	2015–16	First Leaguet	15	3	–	–	0	0	15	3
Ataşehir Belediyesi	Total		96	20	6	0	0	0	102	20
Kdz. Ereğli Belediye Spor	2016–17	First League	11	0	–	–	0	0	11	0
Kdz. Ereğli Belediye Spor	2017–18	First League	6	0	–	–	0	0	6	0
Kdz. Ereğli Belediye Spor	Total		17	0	-	-	0	0	17	0
Fatih Vatan Spor	2017–118	First League	7	1	–	–	0	0	7	1
Fatih Vatan Spor	Total		7	1	-	-	0	0	7	1
Kdz. Ereğli Belediye Spor	2018–19	First League	15	0	–	–	0	0	15	0
Kdz. Ereğli Belediye Spor	2019–20	First League	16	0	–	–	0		0	16
Kdz. Ereğli Belediye Spor	Total		31	0	-	-	0	0	31	0
Career total			188	59	6	0	23	1	217	60

== Honours ==
Turkish Women's First Football League

Gazi Üniversitesispor
Winners (3): 2006–07, 2007–08, 2009–10
Thrird place (1): 2008–09

Ataşehir Belediyespor
Winners (2): 2010–11, 2011–12
Runners-up (4): 2012–13, 2013–14, 2014–15, 2015–16
