= Sultanbeyli Gücü S.K. =

Sultanbeyli Gücü
- Full name: Sultanbeyli Gücü Spor Kulübü
- Founded: 28 April 2006; 20 years ago (club); 2007; 19 years ago (women's team)
- Ground: İBB Sultanbeyli 100th Anniversary Stadium
- Capacity: 3,000
- Coordinates: 40.969050°N 29.255290°E
- Chairman: Mehmet Suat Özcan
- Manager: (Turkey) İsmet Kamak
- League: Turkish Women's Football Super League
- 2025-26: 12th
- Website: https://www.fatihvatanspor.com.tr/

Sultanbeyli Gücü Spor Kulübü, formerly known as Fatih Vatan Spor Kulübü, is a women's football team based in Fatih, Istanbul. The team compete in the topflidht Turkish Women's Super League.

== History ==
=== Club's foundation (2006) ===
Ali Haydar Şahin, teacher of physical education in the high school Fatih Vatan Lisesi situated at Vatan Boulevard in Fatih district of Istanbul, Turkey, formed school football teams for both boys and girls. The success of the boys' team led to the establishment of the club named Fatih Vatan Lisesi Spor Kulübü Derneği (Fatih Vatan Sport Club Association) on 28 April 2006 , which was renamed later to Fatih Vatan Spor. With the contributions of the Fatih District Municipality, the club’s administrative offices, a meeting room, a lounge for athletes, and locker rooms were constructed in the basement of the high school, which was previously unused. The Küçükçekmece District Municipality provided the interior furnishings and addressed various other requirements, transforming the sports club into a modern and well-equipped facility. The club opened divisions of athletics and basketball in addition to men's football.

=== Fatih Vatan Lisesi Spor Kulübü (2007–2013) ===
The women's football side was established in the beginning of the 2007–08 season. The Fatih Vatan High School Sports Club’s girls' youth team—comprising students from Fatih Vatan High School (winners of the Fatih District Governorship Cup for high schools) and reinforced by students from Alpaslan Vocational High School of Commerce—participated in the group stage of the Turkish Girls' Youth Championship held in Kütahya. In the 2009–10 season, the women’s senior football team—participating for the first time in the third-tier Women's Regional League—finished second in their group, and qualified for the promotion playoffs for the second division, but failed due to lack of available players and various injuries. In the 2010–11 season, the women’s senior football team finished second in their group in the Women’s Regional League, thereby qualifying for the promotion play-offs. Following a successful performance in the final group stage, the team earned promotion to the Women's Second League. The team finished its group in fourth place during the 2011–12 and 2012–13 seasons.

=== Fatih Vatan Spor Kulübü (2013–2026) ===
On 30 January 2013, the club chanhed its original name from Fatih Vatan Lisesi Spor Kulübü to Fatih Vatan Spor Kulübü omitting the word "Lisesi" (high school). Following a league restructuring by the Federation, the team was relegated to the Women's Third League despite having finished the 2013–14 season in third place. In the 2014–15 season, the team finished first in its group but was eliminated after losing in the play-off matches. In the 2015–16 season, Fatih Vatan Spor finished second in its group and earned promotion to the Women's Second League following the play-offs. In the 2016–17 season, the team completed both its group stage and the play-off matches undefeated, earning promotion to the Women's First League. After competing in the Women's First League during the 2017–18, 2018–19, and 2019–20 seasons, the team reached the final in the 2020–21 season, following a series of group and knockout-style matches, where they finished as the runners-up. The league seasons from the 2021–22 on were contested as the Women's Super League.

=== Sultanbeyli Gücü Spor Kulübü (2026– ) ===
The club changed its name from Fatih Vatan Spor to Sultanbeyli Gücü before the beginning of the 2026–27 Women's Super League season.

== Stadium ==
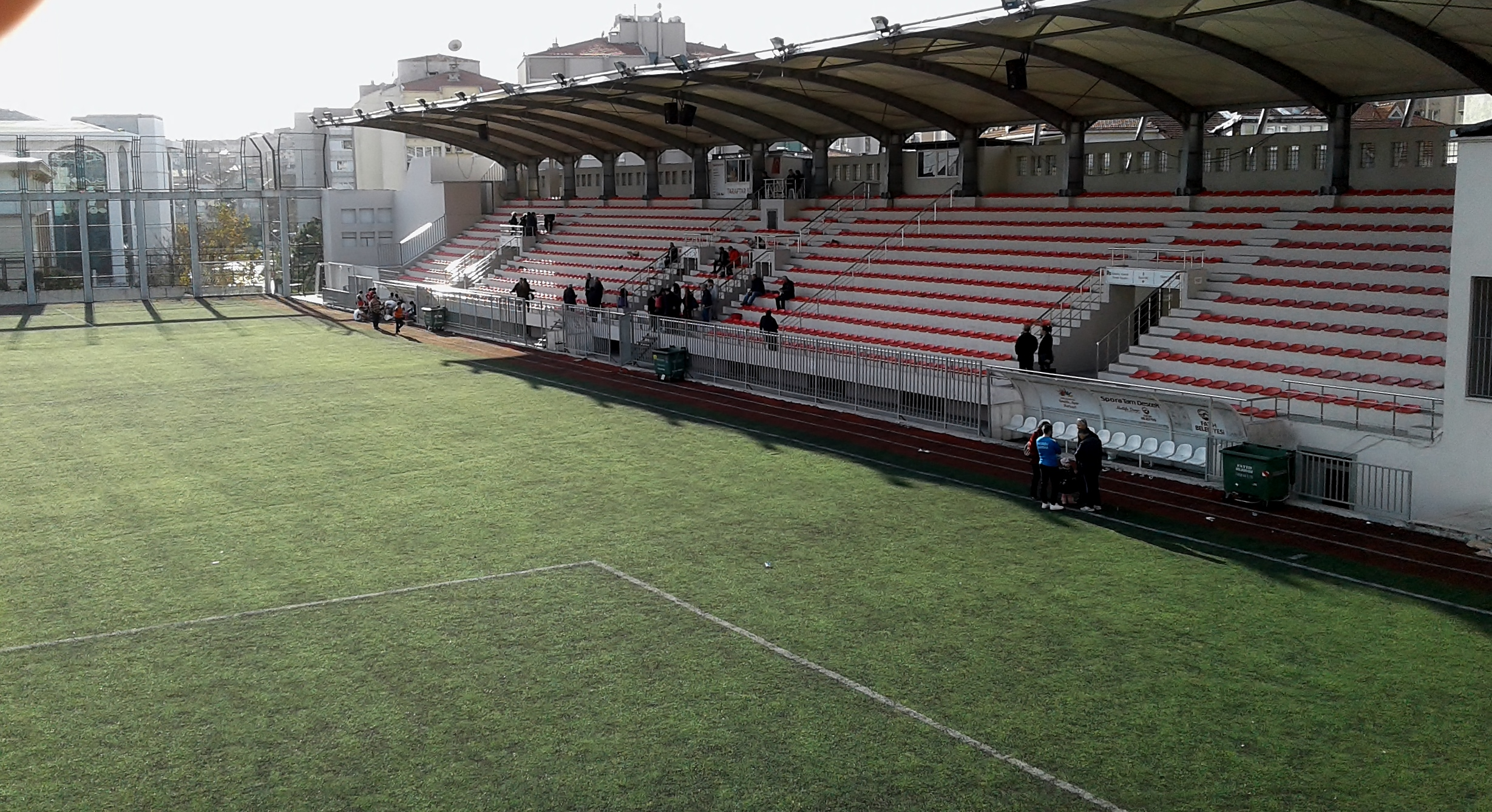
Fatih Mimar Sinan Stadium, home ground of Sultanbeyli Gücü until the end of the 2023–24 Super League season.

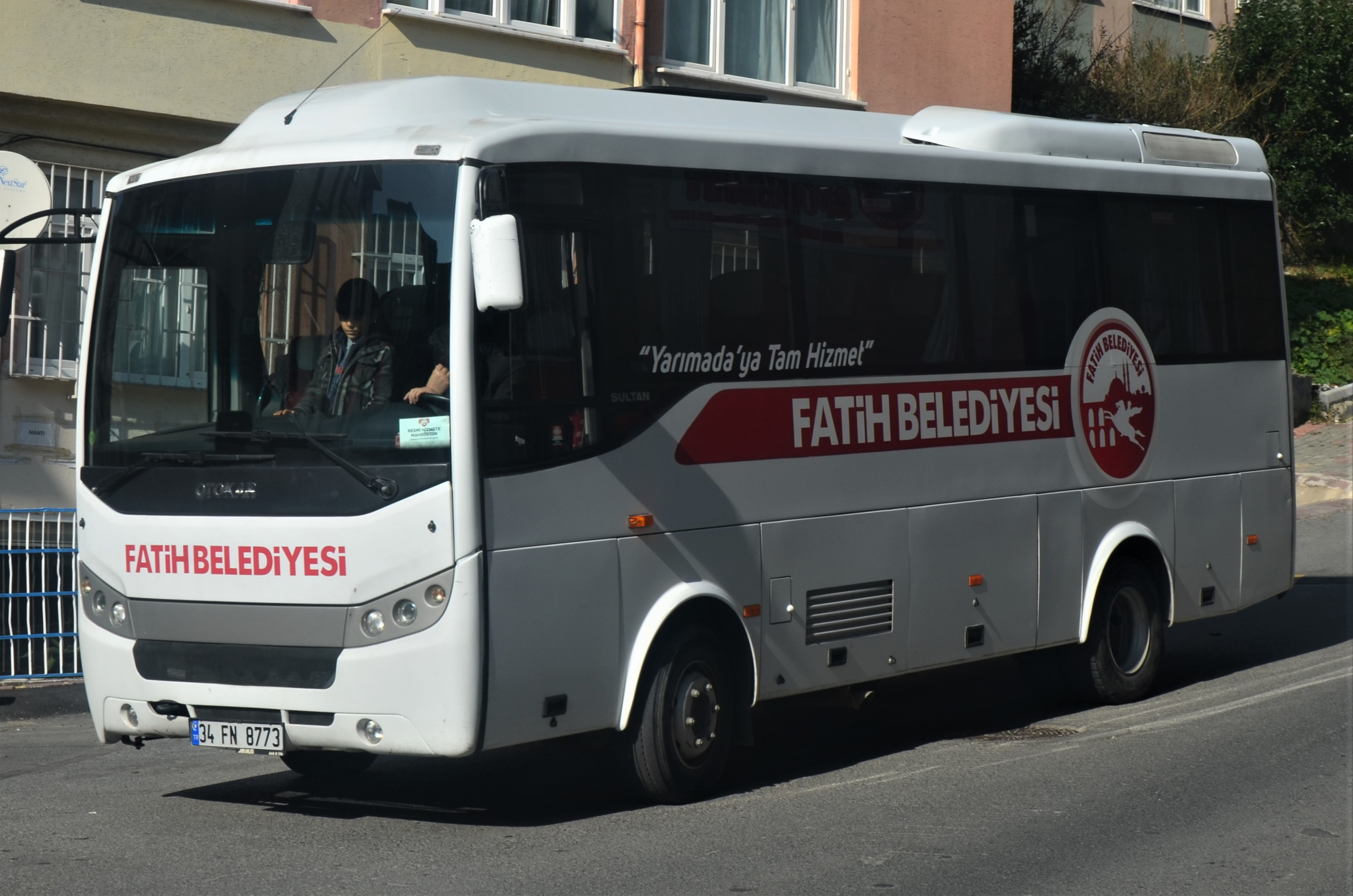
Team bus of Sultanbeyli Gücü.

The team play their home matches in Fatih Mimar Sinan Stadium.

In the 2024–25 Super League season, the team play their home matches at Bahçelievler İÖİ Stadum (Turkish: Bahçelievler İl Özel İdaresi Stadı) located in the Yenibosna neighborhood of Bahçelievler district.

The team moved to İBB Balat Stadium, located in the Ayvansaray Neighborhood of Fatih district, for their home matches in the 2025–26 Turkish Women's Football Super League season.

Following the name change to Sultanbeyli Gücü, the team started to play the home matches at the İBB Sultanbeyli 100th Anniversary Stadium.

== Statistics ==
As of 1 November 2026

Season	League	Rank	Pld	W	D	L	GF	GA	GD	Pts
2009–10	Regional League Gr. 1	2	10	7	0	3	35	13	+22	21
2010–11	Regional League Gr. Marmara	2	10	5	4	1	33	12	+21	19
2011–12	Second League Gr. 1	4	10	4	1	5	18	35	−17	13
2012–13	Second League Gr. 1	4	10	4	0	6	27	35	−8	12
2013–14	Second League Gr. 1	3	14	10	2	2	77	10	+67	32
2014–15	Third League Gr. 1	5	16	14	1	1	80	16	+64	43
2015–16	Third League Gr. 1	3	22	18	2	2	88	20	+68	56
2016–17	Second League Gr. 1	1	18	14	4	0	140	9	+131	46
2017–18	First League	6	18	6	1	11	24	35	−11	19
2018–19	First League	9	18	4	2	12	19	58	−39	14
2019–20	First league	5 (Note: Season stopped due to COVID-19 pandemic in Turkey)	15	9	1	5	30	30	0	28
2020–21	First League Gr. A	2	6	4	0	2	16	6	+10	12
2021–22	Super League Gr. A	3	22	15	2	5	45	19	+26	47
2021–22	Play-offs	Elim.	2	0	1	1	0	2	−2	1
2022–23	Super Leage Gr. A	3	16	7	4	5	22	18	+4	25
2022–23	Play-offs	Elim.	4	2	1	1	11	4		
2023–24	Super League	12	30	9	3	18	42	58	−16	30
2024–25	Super League	8	26	11	3	12	44	30	+14	36
2025–26	Super League	12	30	8	4	18	37	92	-55	25 (Note: 3 points were deducted by the decision of the Federation due to no show-up)
2026–27	Super League	9	9 (Note: Season in progress)	3	1	5	17	26	-9	10
Green marks a season followed by promotion, red a season followed by relegation.

- Legend:

== Current squad ==
As of 28 October 2026.

Head coach: (Turkey) Çağdaş Töre

Note: Flags indicate national team as defined under FIFA eligibility rules; some limited exceptions apply. Players may hold more than one non-FIFA nationality.

No.	Pos.	Nation	Player
1	GK	TUR	Duygu Yılmaz
25	GK	TUR	Ayşe Nur Göktürk
96	GK	TUR	Sude Nur Yolcu
3	DF	CMR	Judith Menguene
5	DF	TUR	Çiğdem Belci
6	DF	TUR	Nur Yuntur
14	DF	TUR	Serpil İşler
4	MF	TUR	Ayşe Şevval Ay
7	MF	TUR	Canan Çetin
8	MF	TUR	Tuana Yılmaz

No.	Pos.	Nation	Player
11	MF	TUR	Fatmanur Yantur
18	MF	TUR	Açelya Nomak
21	MF	USA	Teresa Deda
23	MF	TUR	Ülkü Kahya
30	MF	TUR	Havva İsgi
55	MF	TUN	Amani Ayed
10	FW	TUR	Şehriban Dülek
15	FW	ALB	Valentina Troka
84	FW	TUR	Irmak Olmazer
99	FW	TUR	Cansu İriş

== Former notable players ==
Azerbaijan

- Farkhunda Muhtaj
- Yeliz Açar
- Aysun Aliyeva
- Nargiz Aliyeva
- Peritan Bozdağ
- Mislina Gözükara
- Nargiz Hajiyeva
- Bilge Su Koyun
- Nazlıcan Parlak

Bosnia and Herzegovina

- Almina Hodžić

Burkina Faso

- Juliette Nana

Cameroon

- Jacquette Ada

Canada

- Daphnée Blouin
- Kathryn Harvey

Egypt

- Menna Tarek

Georgia

- Teona Sukhashvili

Ghana

- Priscilla Okyere

Ivory Coast

- Aminata Haidara
- Fanta Zara Kamaté

Kazakhstan

- Oksana Zheleznyak

Montenegro

- Darija Đukić
- Jelena Karličić

Romania

- Teodora Nicoară

Serbia

- Jelena Čubrilo
- Marija Ilić
- Nikoleta Nikolić

South Africa

- Letago Madiba
- Rachel Sebati

Spain

- Saira Posada

Tunisia

- {Yasmine Jemai
- Salima Jobrani
- Wafe Messaoud

Turkey

- Serenay Aktaş
- Zelal Baturay
- Ezgi Çağlar
- Emine Demir
- Lütfiye Ercimen
- Kader Hançar
- Tuğba Karataş
- Cansu Nur Kaya
- Beyza Kocatürk
- Esra Manya
- Safa Merve Nalçacı
- Ceren Nurlu
- Serenay Öziri
- Melike Öztürk
- Fatma Şahin
- Narin Yakut

United States

- Opal Curless
- Hanna Barker
- Alesia Garcia
- Aryana Harvey
- Sydny Nasello

Zambia

- Hazel Nali

== Honours ==
- Crystal Feet – Fair Play Team: 2023–24.

Women's Second League
Winners (1): 2016–17

== Kit history ==
2017–18 home	2017–18 away	2018–19 home	2018–19 away	2019–20 home	2020–21 home
2021–22 home	2021–22 away	2022–23 away	2023–24 away	2024–25 away

== Squad history ==
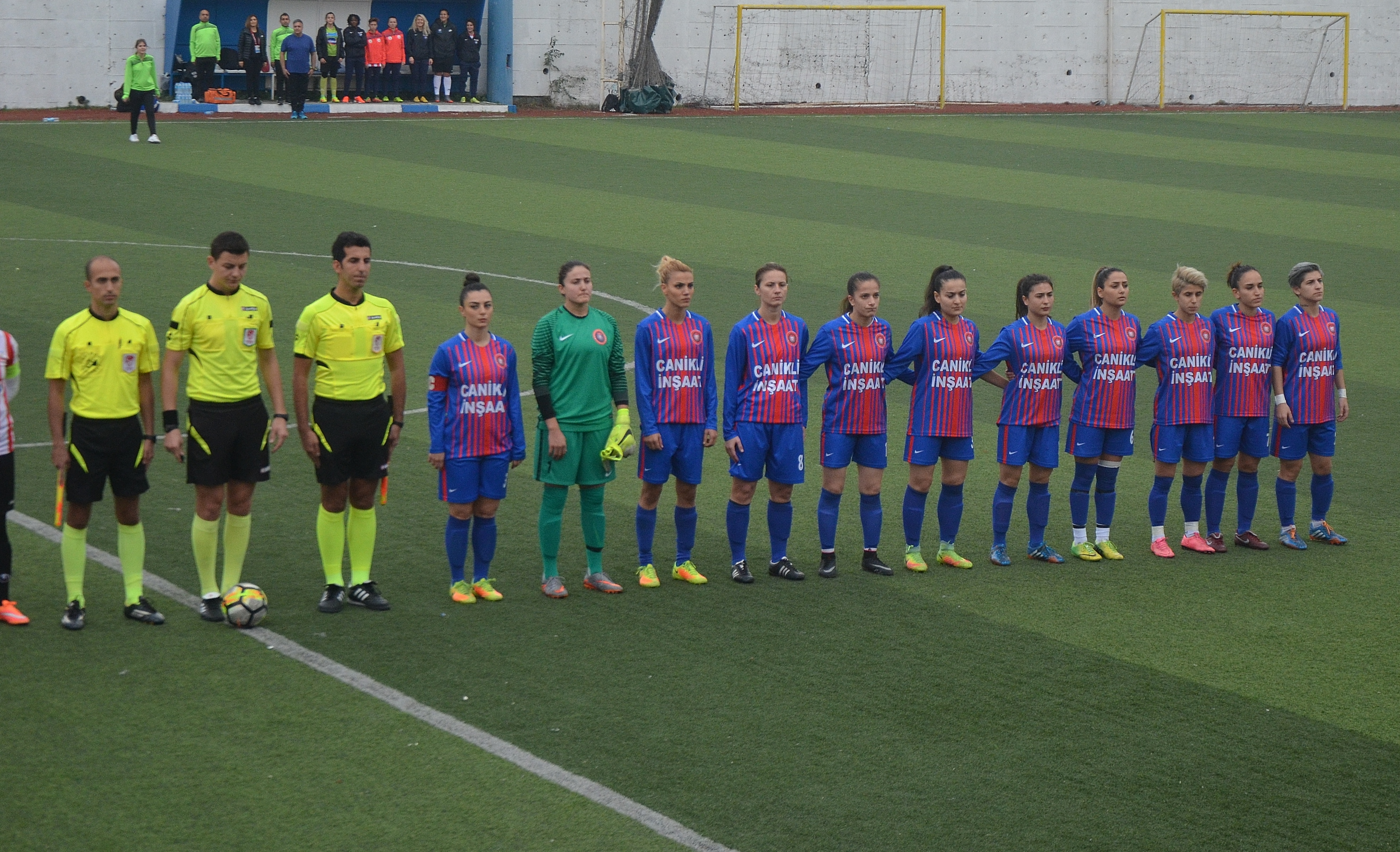
2017–18 First League season

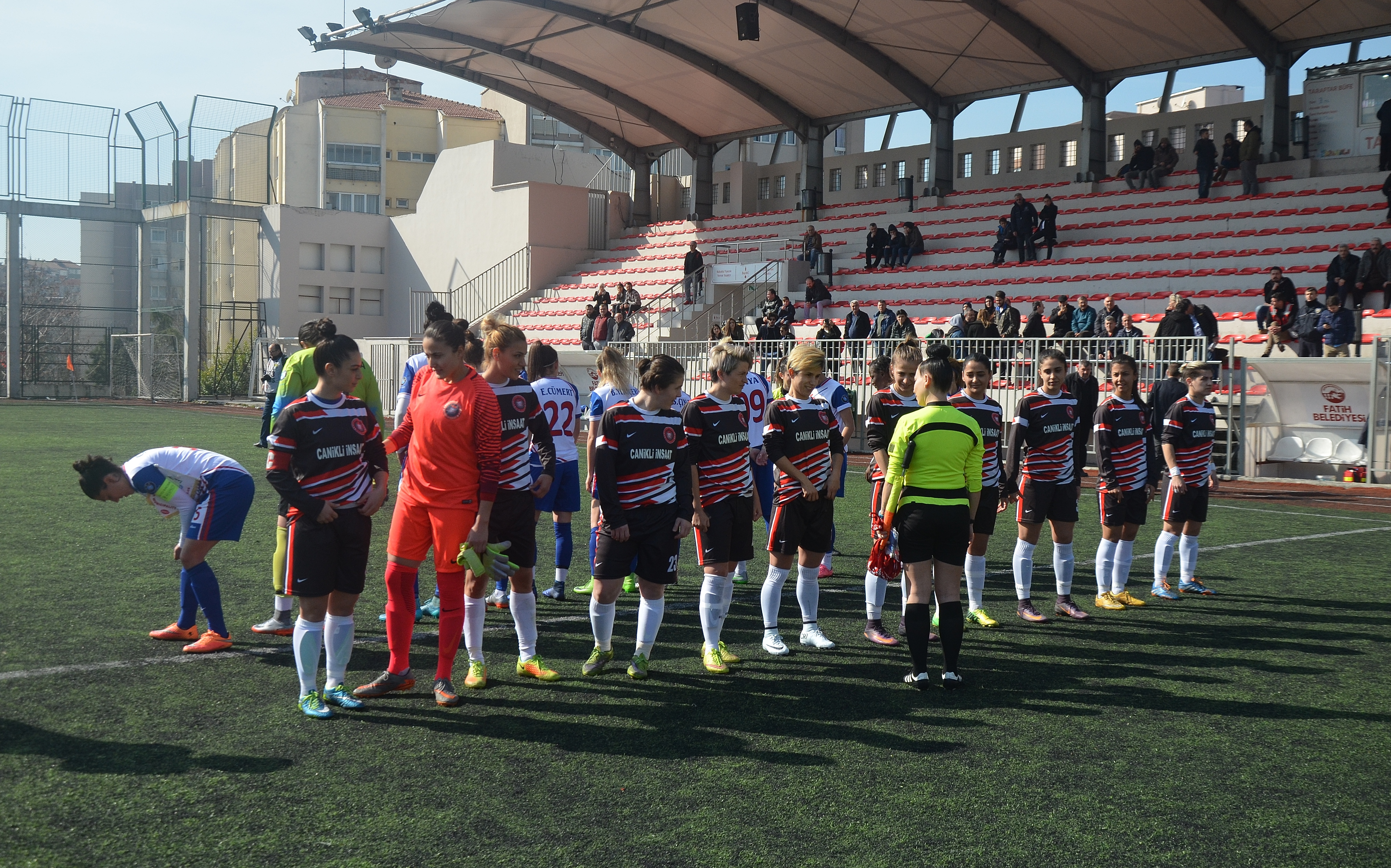
2017–18 First League season

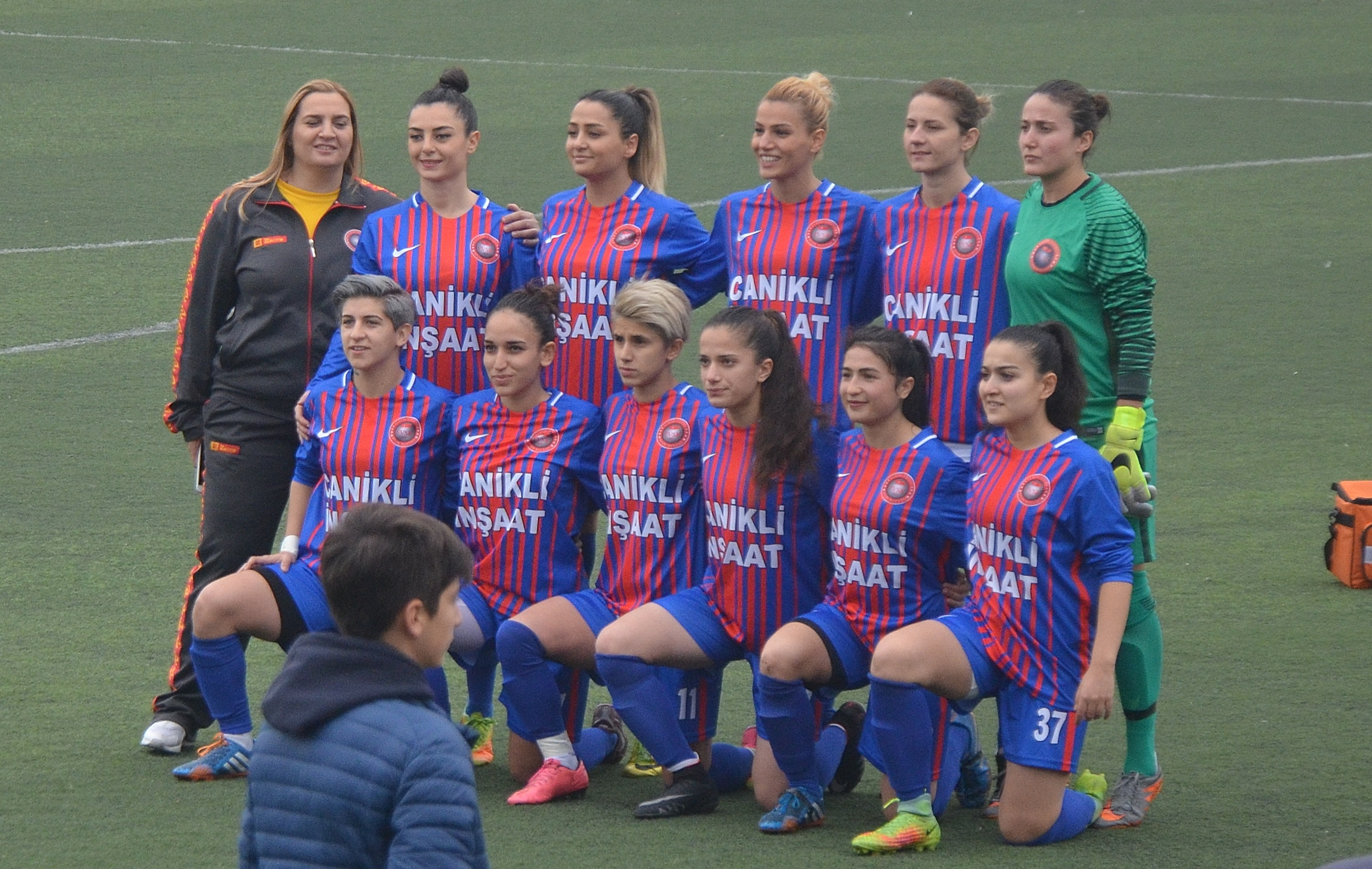
2017–18 First League season

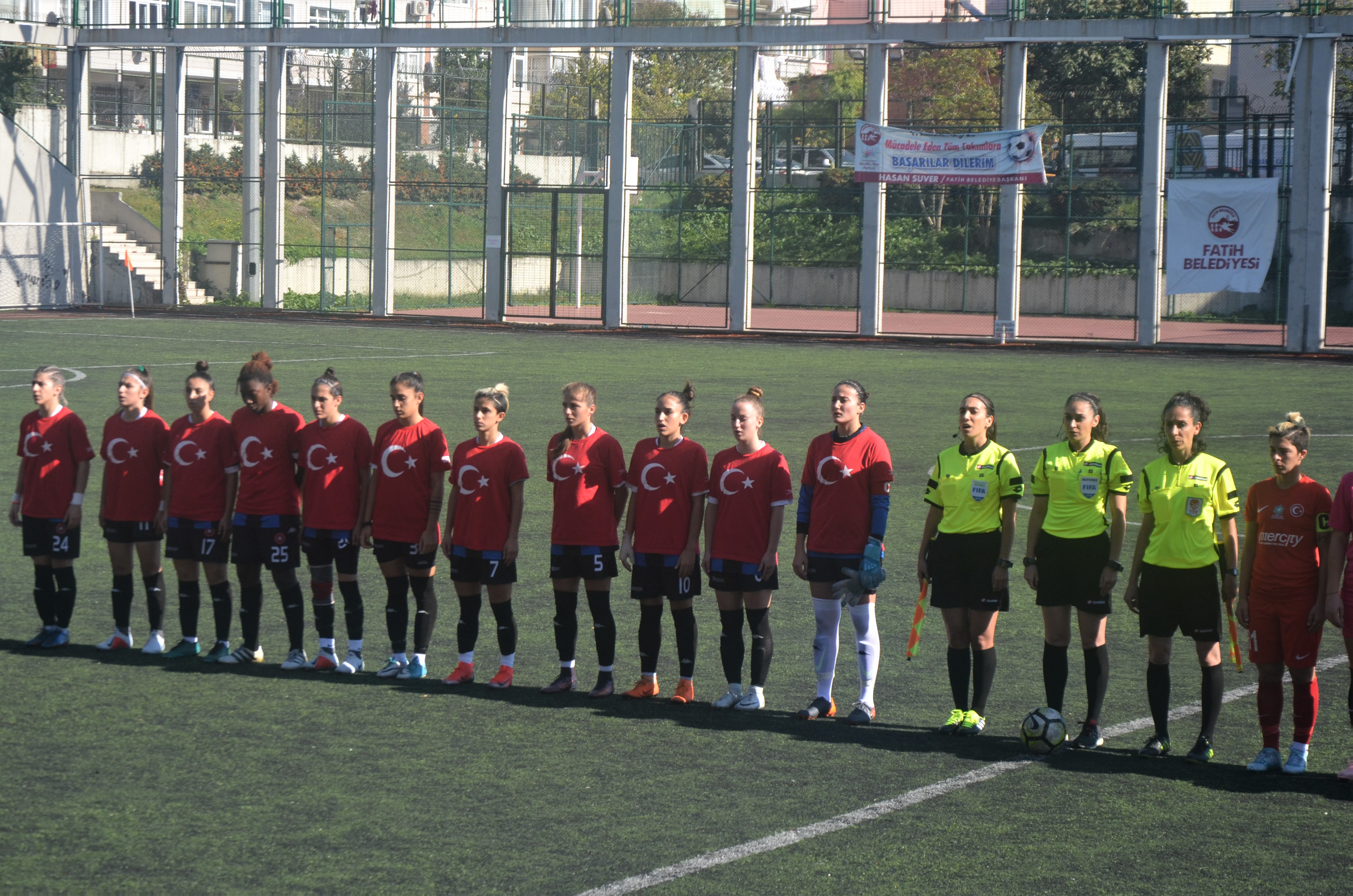
2018–19 First League season

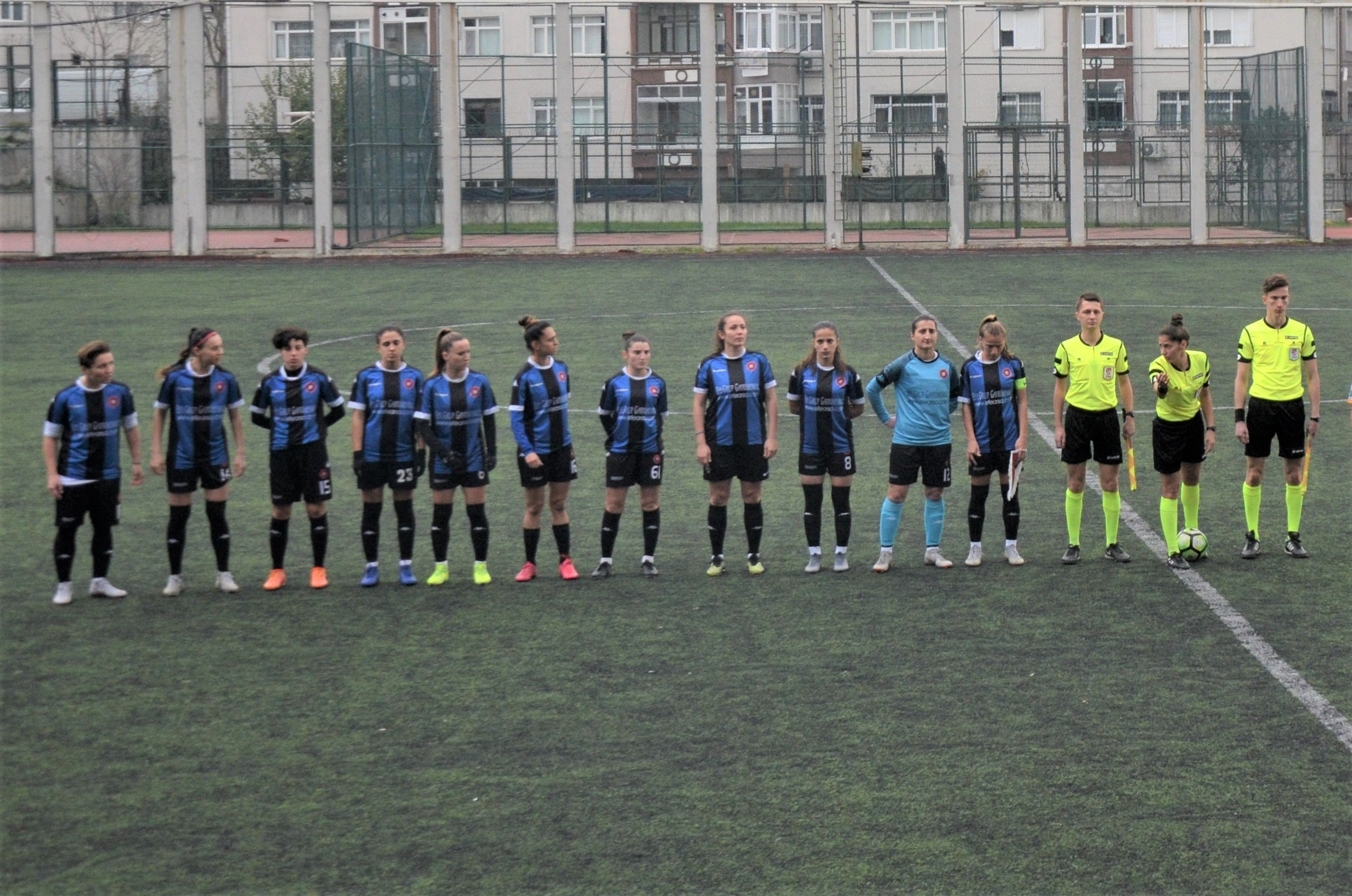
2019-20 First League season

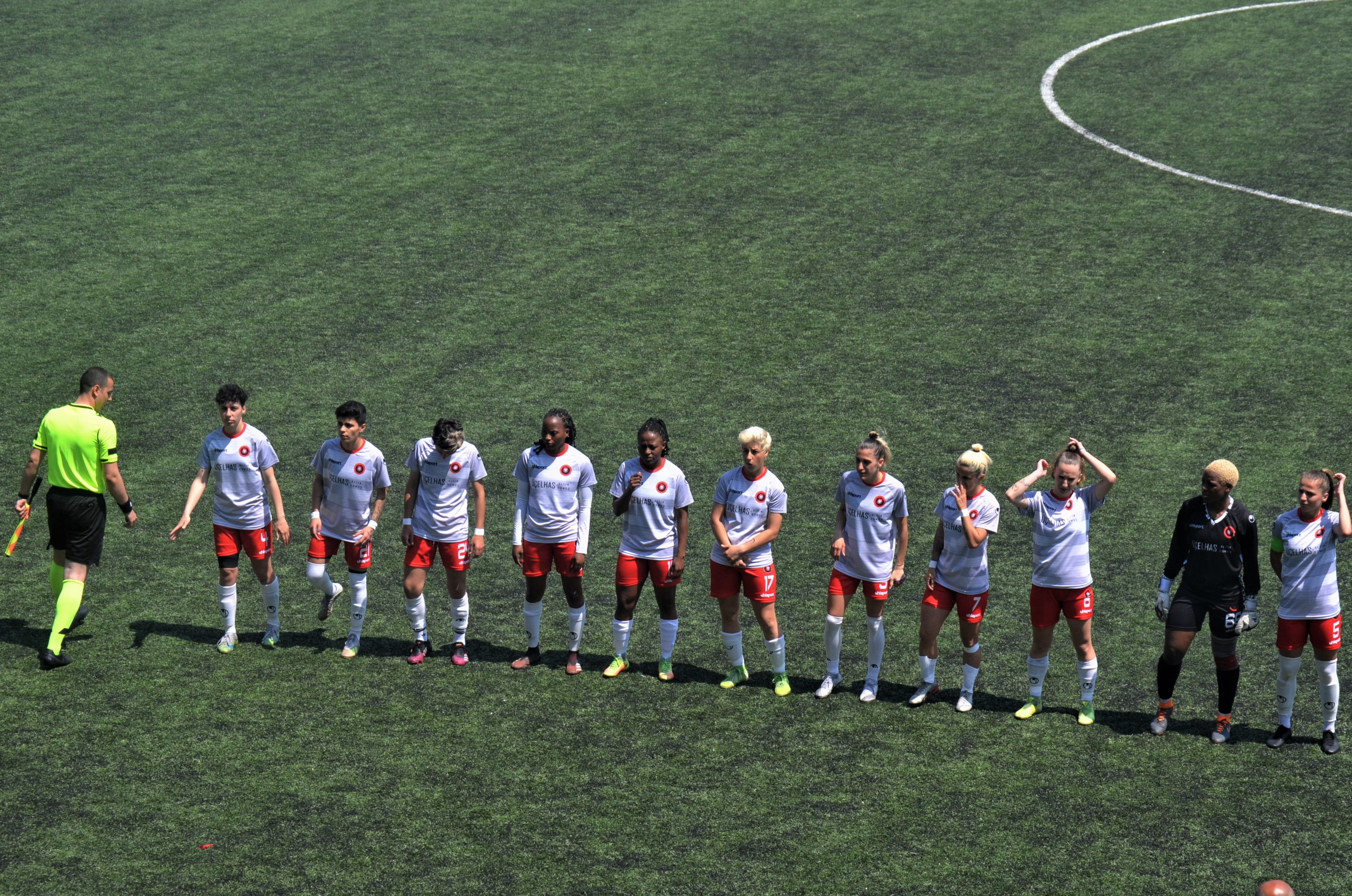
2021-22 Super League play-offs

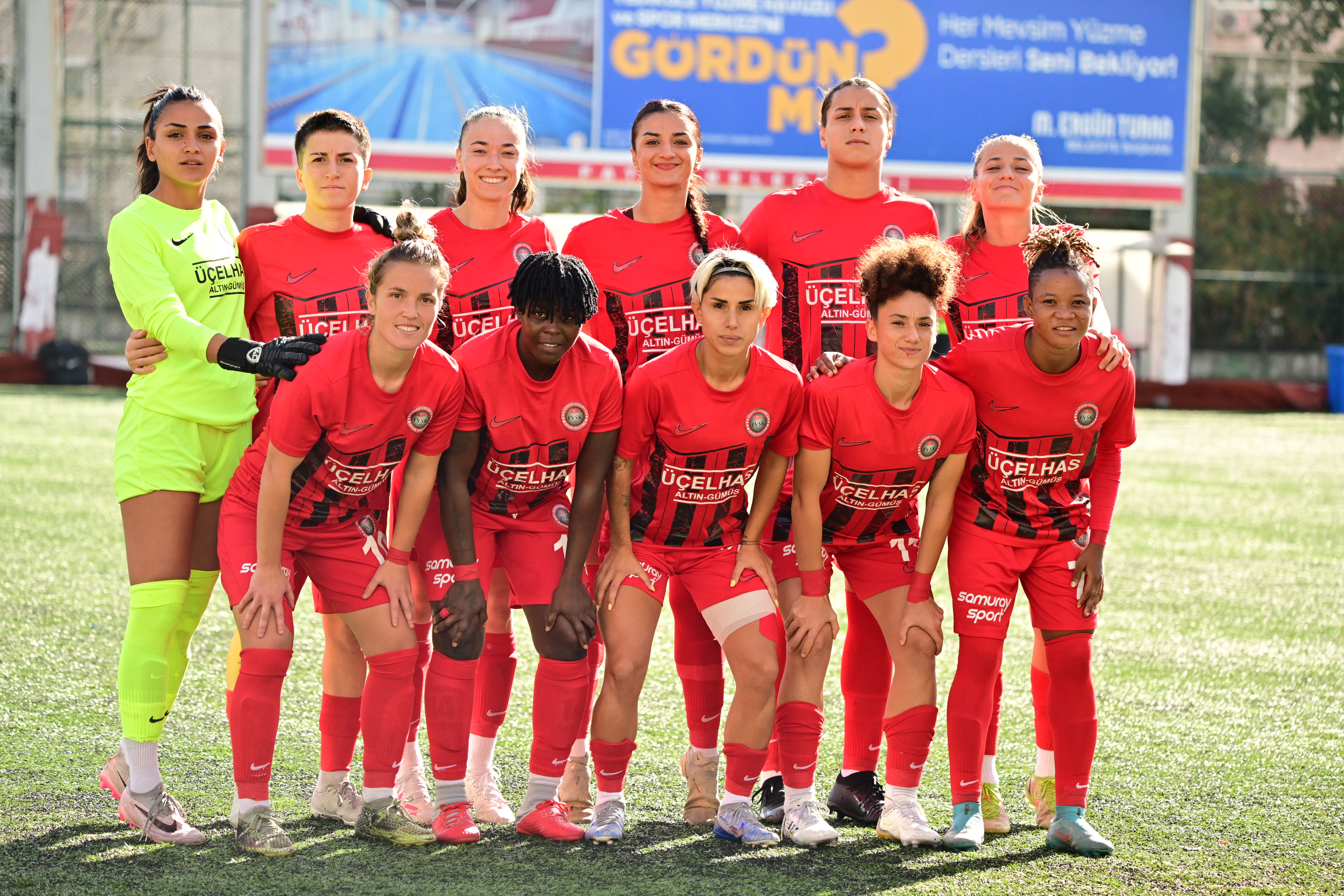
2023-24 Super League season
