= Bilge Su Koyun =

Azerbaijani footballer (born 1999)

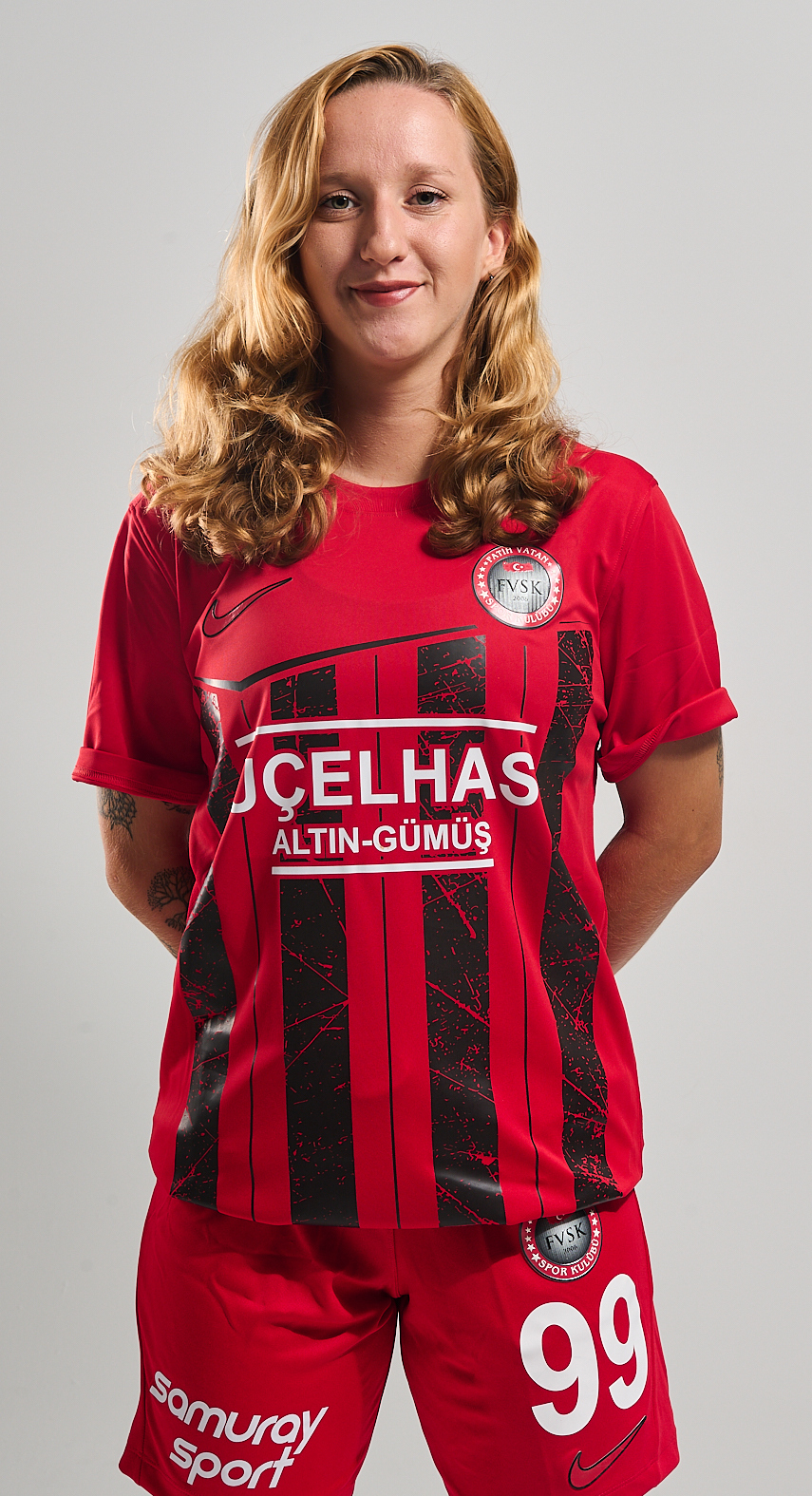
- Koyun with Fatih Vatan Spor in 2023

Personal information
- Date of birth: 3 July 1999 (age 27)
- Place of birth: Bahçelievler, Istanbul, Turkey
- Position: Midfielder

Team information
- Current team: Fatih Vatan Spor
- Number: 6

Senior career*
Years	Team	Apps	(Gls)
2014–2018	Beşiktaş	67	(5)
2018–	Fatih Vatan Spor	71	(4)

International career^{‡}
2015	Turkey U-17	1	(0)
2016–2018	Turkey U-19	21	(0)
2021–	Azerbaijan	6	(0)
- * Club domestic league appearances and goals as of 5 February 2023 ‡ National team caps and goals as of 30 November 2021

Bilge Su Koyun (born 3 July 1999) is a footballer who plays as a midfielder for Turkish Women's Super League club Fatih Vatan Spor. Born in Turkey, she represents Azerbaijan internationally. She previously played for her country of birth at under-17 and under-19 levels.

== Early life ==
Koyun was born in Bahçelievler district of Istanbul Province, Turkey on 3 July 1999.

== Club career ==
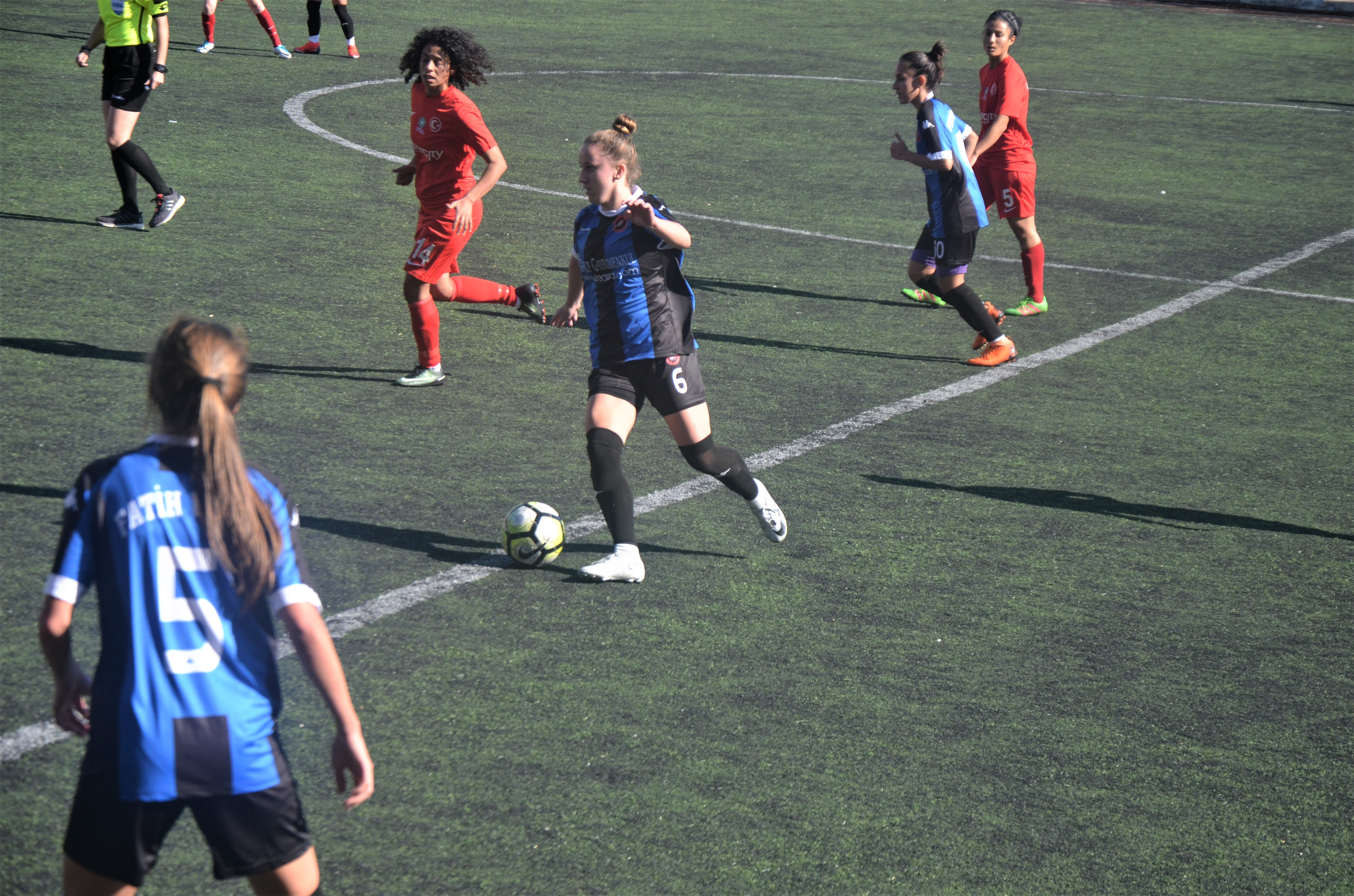
Bilge Su Koyun (#6) playing for Fatih Vatan Spor in the 2018–19 First League's home match against Ataşehir Belediyespor.

Koyun obtained her license from Beşiktaş J.K. on 30 May, 2014. She started to play in the 2014–15 Turkey Women's Third League. Her team was promoted at the end of that season to the Second League. Her team finished the season as winner, and she enjoyed her team's promotion to the First League.

In the 2018–19 First League season, she transferred to Fatih Vatan Spor.

== International career ==
=== Turkey ===
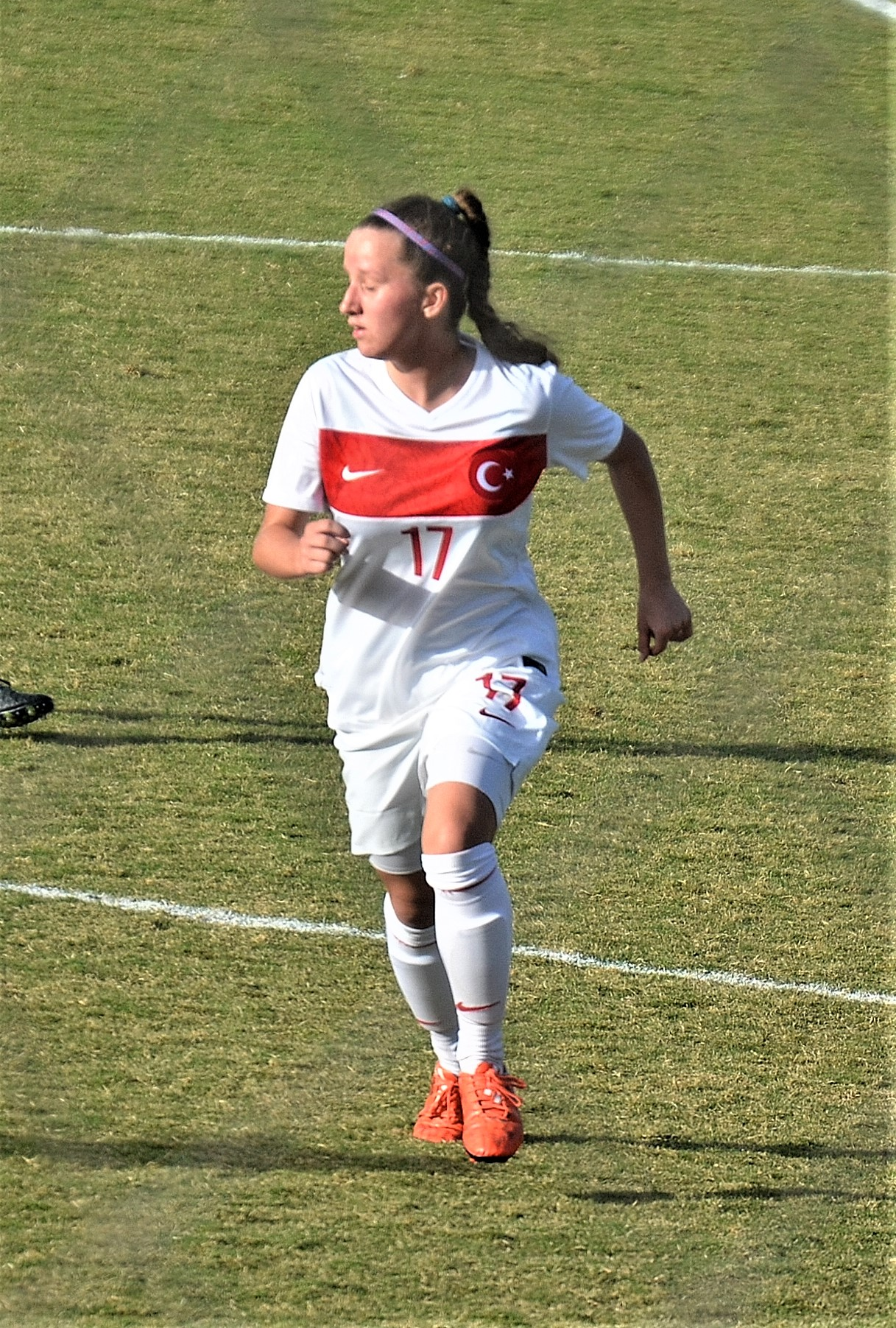
Bilge Su Koyun for Turkey U-17 (October 2015)

Koyun was admitted to the Turkey girls' U-17 ream and debuted in the 2016 UEFA Women's Under-17 Championship qualification – Group 1 match against Ireland on 20 October 2015.

She was called up to the Turkey women's U-19 team to play in the 2016 UEFA Development Tournament, which became champion. She took part at the 2017 UEFA Women's U-19 Championship qualification – Group 10, 2017 UEFA Women's U-19 Championship qualification – Elite round Group 2, 2018 UEFA Women's U-19 Championship qualification – Group 10 and 2018 UEFA Women's U-19 Championship qualification – Elite round Group 4 matches. She appeared also in friendly matches.

=== Azerbaijan ===
Koyun became a member of the Azerbaijan women's national football team. She played in six matches of the 2023 FIFA Women's World Cup qualification – UEFA Group E.

== Career statistics ==
As of match played 5 February 2023.

Club	Season	League			Continental		National		Total	
Club	Season	Division	Apps	Goals	Apps	Goals	Apps	Goals	Apps	Goals
Beşiktaş J.K.	2014–15	Third League	18	1	–	–	0	0	18	1
Beşiktaş J.K.	2015–16	Second League	20	2	–	–	4	0	24	2
Beşiktaş J.K.	2016–17	First League	18	0	–	–	5	0	23	0
Beşiktaş J.K.	2017–18	First League	11	2	–	–	13	0	24	2
Beşiktaş J.K.	Total		67	5	–	–	22	0	89	5
Fatih Vatan Spor	2018–19	First League	16	0	–	–	0	0	16	0
Fatih Vatan Spor	2019–20	First League	15	1	–	–	0	0	15	1
Fatih Vatan Spor	2020–21	First League	5	0	–	–	0	0	5	0
Fatih Vatan Spor	2021–22	Super League	22	3	–	–	6	0	28	3
Fatih Vatan Spor	2022–23	Super League	13	0	–	–	0	0	13	0
Fatih Vatan Spor	Total		71	4	–	–	6	0	67	4
Career total			138	9	–	–	28	0	166	9

== Honours ==
=== Club ===
Turkish Women's First Football League

Beşiktaş J.K.
Runners-up (2): 2016–17, 2017–18

Fatih Vatan Spor
Runners-up /1): 2020–21

Turkish Women's Second Football League

Beşiktaş J.K.
Winners (1): 2015–16

Turkish Women's Third Football League

Beşiktaş J.K.
Winners (1): 2014–05

=== International ===
UEFA Development Tournament

Turkey women's U-19
Winners (1): 2016
