= Mount Desert Island High School =

Location
- 1081 Eagle Lake Road; Bar Harbor, Maine 04609; United States; 44.372952°N 68.301203°W

Information
- Other name: MDIHS
- Type: Public high school
- Established: 1968
- School district: Mount Desert Island Regional School System
- NCES School ID: 230850000061
- Principal: Matthew Haney
- Teaching staff: 54.10 (on an FTE basis)
- Grades: 9–12
- Enrollment: 474 (2023–2024)
- Student to teacher ratio: 8.76
- Colors: Green, white, and gold
- Athletics conference: Penobscot Valley Conference Big East Eastern Maine Indoor Track League
- Mascot: Troy the Trojan
- Nickname: Trojans
- Accreditation: NEASC
- Newspaper: Trojan Tribune
- Yearbook: Islander
- Website: www.mdihs.net

Mount Desert Island High School (MDIHS) is a public high school in Bar Harbor, Maine, United States. It was established in 1968 and is part of the Mount Desert Island Regional School District.

== History ==
Mount Desert Island High School opened in fall 1968, absorbing students from Bar Harbor High School, Pemetic High School and Mount Desert High School (which previously merged with Gilman). Consolidation votes in 1949 and 1959 failed, but a successful 1965 vote started the process. Proponents of the consolidation stressed more opportunities for students and a better preparation for the professional life, while dissenters stressed a loss of local identity. After the consolidation, students from the three high schools stayed in cliques according to geographic area.

In 2019, the school converted to relying solely on solar energy.

== Athletics ==
Beginning in 2020, the Trojan football team played in an 8-man format. They had previously played in the Big 11 Football Conference.

The school has achieved the following state championships:

- Swimming and Diving (boys) — 2004, 2005, 2006, 2007, 2008, 2009, 2018, 2019, 2020
- Swimming and Diving(girls) — 1982, 1989, 2011, 2013, 2014, 2020
- Tennis (girls) — 1987, 1988, 1989
- Track and Field (boys, outdoor) — 2018, 2021
- Track and Field (boys, indoor) — 2017
- Track and Field (girls, indoor) — 1980, 1981, 1982
- Cross Country (girls) — 1976, 1980, 1981, 1982, 2006, 2011, 2012, 2013, 2021, 2024
- Cross Country (boys) — 1972, 1973, 1986
- Soccer (girls) — 1997
- Basketball (boys) — 2017
- Basketball (girls) — 1997, 2001, 2002, 2003
- Football — 2023
- Sailing —1997, 2008, 2009
- Volleyball —2025

== Music ==
The school fields three vocal ensembles a concert choir and two competitive show choirs: a mixed-gender group and the all-female "Trojan Trebles". The school also has many instrumental ensembles including a pep band, symphonic band, string orchestra, competition jazz big band, and several jazz combos. In 2008 and 2011 the school's pep band performed in the London New Years Day parade.

The music department has achieved the following state championships:

Show Choir — 2013, 2015, 2016, 2018, 2019

Jazz Big Band — 1988, 2016

== Drama ==
MDI has a theater program that produces three or four shows a year. A fall musical, winter competition one-act play, and one or two spring plays.

MDI Drama has achieved the following state championships.

One-Act Play — 1969, 1971, 1972, 1974, 1977, 1978, 1983, 1996, 2017, 2018

== Technology ==
The school has had a strong VEX robotics team. In 2018 the team won the Maine State Championship. In 2021 MDIHS introduced an esports team. The team won the League of Legends State Championship in 2021.

== Notable alumni ==
- Matthew Dunlap, politician
- Gary Allen, Athlete, founder of the MDI Marathon
- Opal Curless, Professional soccer player
