= Serenay Öziri =

Turkish footballer (born 1994)

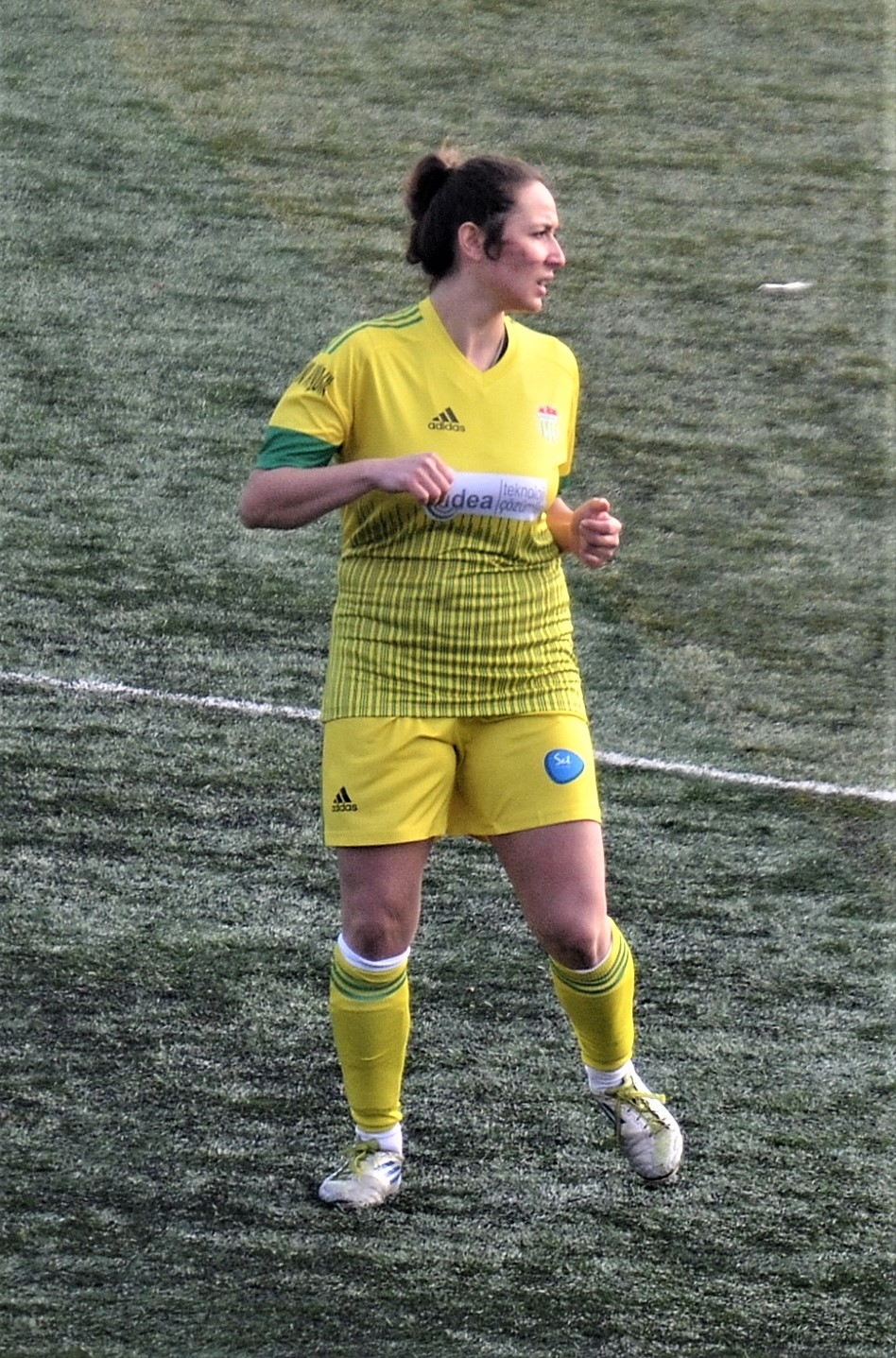
- Serenay Öziri of Kireçburnu Spor in the 2015–16 season.

Personal information
- Date of birth: 21 December 1994 (age 31)
- Place of birth: Gölcük, Kocaeli, Turkey
- Position: Defender

Team information
- Current team: Fatih Vatan Spor
- Number: 4

Senior career*
Years	Team	Apps	(Gls)
2008–2011	Gölcükspor	42	(2)
2011–2012	İzmit Belediyespor	16	(4)
2012–2013	İzmit Çenesuyu Plajyoluspor	6	(3)
2013–2014	Derince Belediyespor	21	(3)
2014–2017	Kireçburnu Spor	52	(21)
2017–2019	Kdz. Ereğli Belediye Spor	27	(7)
2019–	Fatih Vatan Spor	7	(2)

International career^{‡}
2009–2010	Turkey U-17	6	(0)
2012	Turkey U-19	2	(0)
- * Club domestic league appearances and goals as of 8 December 2019 ‡ National team caps and goals as of 25 October 2012

Serenay Öziri (born 21 December 1994) is a Turkish women's football defender currently playing in the First League for Fatih Vatan Spor with jersey number 4. She was a member of the Turkey girls' U-17 and Turkey women's U-19 teams.

== Personal life ==
Serenay Öziri was born in Gölcük, Kocaeli, Turkey on 21 December 1994. She studies physical education teaching at Kocaeli University.

== Playing career ==
Öziri played football at a very young age with her elder brother. She then played on the street with boys. She began competitive football playing when her physical education teacher formed a girls' team at her school.

She played for her school team of Kocaeli Karşıyaka High School at the 2011 ISF World School Football Championship held in Fortaleza, Brazil. Her team became the runner-up losing to the German team in the final. She became the top scorer of the tournament.

Although playing in the midfield, she is well known for her long-distance goals.

=== Club ===
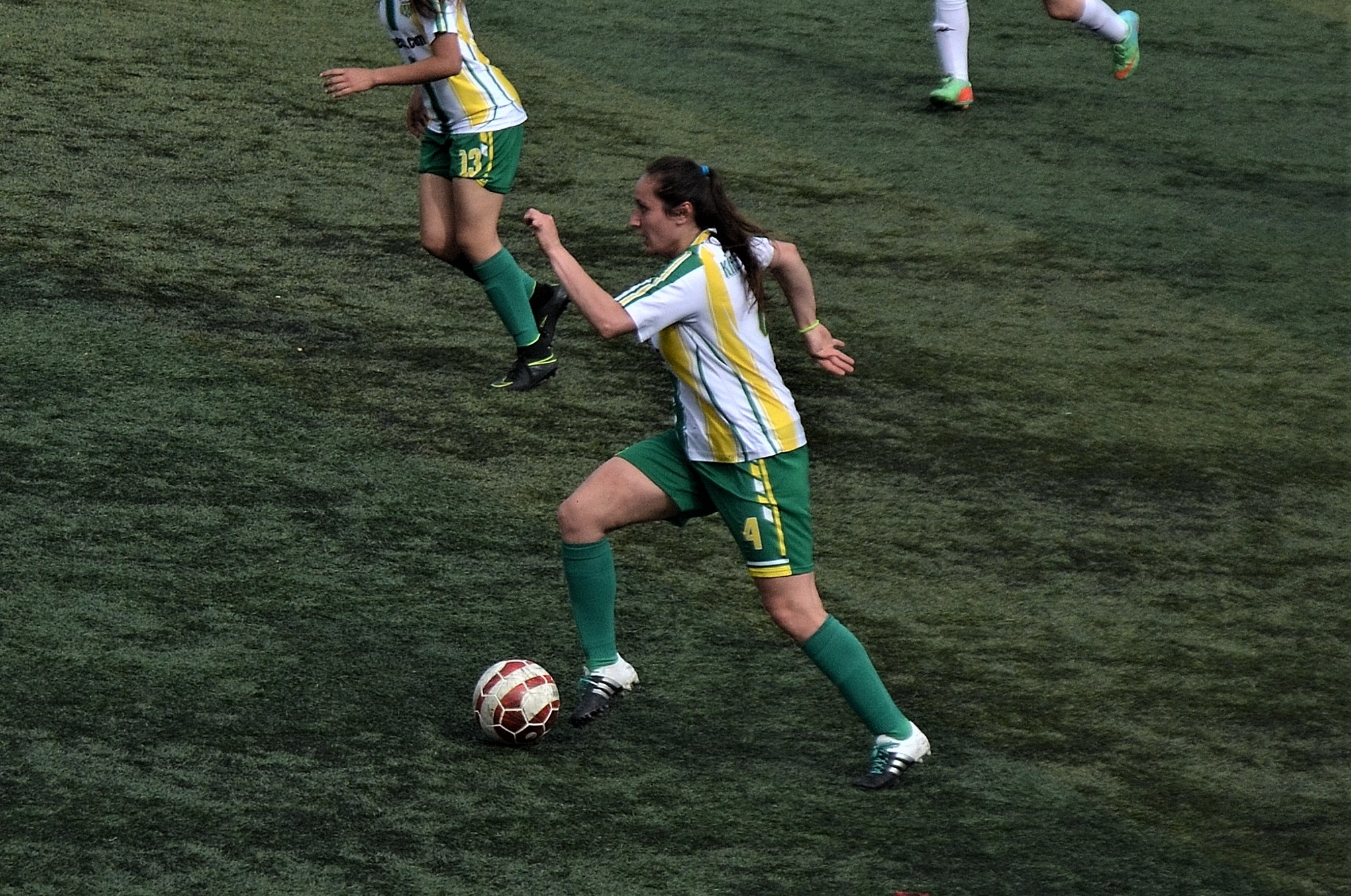
Serenay Öziri playing for Kireçburnu Spor in the 2016–17 season.

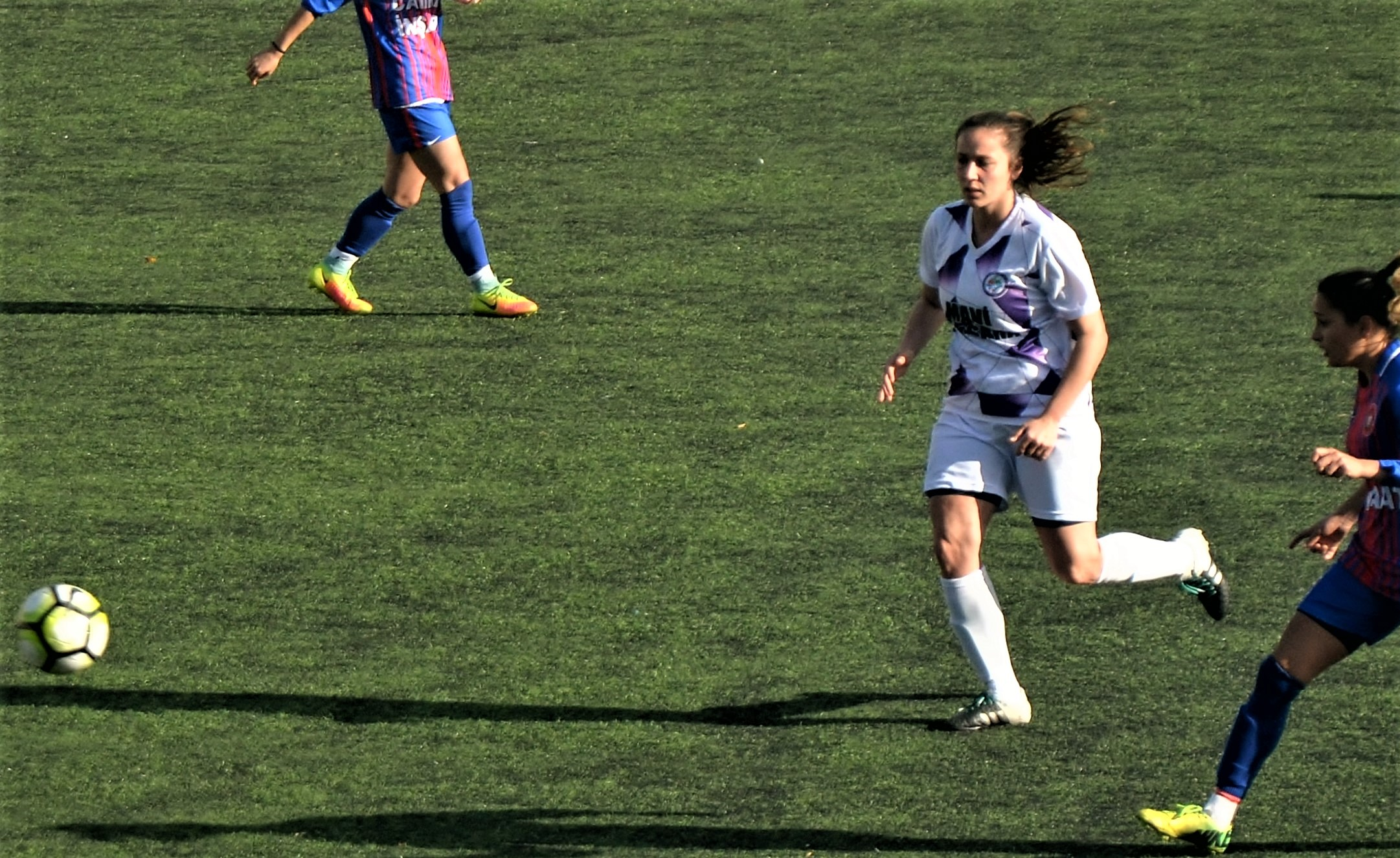
Serenay Öziri playing in the 2017–18 season for Kdz. Ereğlispor.

Öziri obtained her license from her hometown's club Gölcükspor on 10 June 2008. After playing two seasons in the Women's Second League with her team, she appeared in the Women's First League in the 2010–11 season following her team's promotion. She then transferred to İzmit Belediyespor. After one season, she was with İzmit Çenesuyu Plajyoluspor again in the Second League. Her next transfer went to Derince Belediyespor in the second half of the 2012–13 season to appear in the First League. She then transferred to the Istanbul-based Second League playing club Kireçburnu Spor in the 2014–15 season, and enjoyed her team's promotion to the First League at the end of the season. After playing three seasons in total, Öziri signed with Kdz. Ereğlispor for the 2017–18 season.

By October 2019, she transferred to the Istanbul-based club Fatih Vatan Spor.

=== International ===
Öziri was admitted to the Turkey girls' national U-17 team, and debuted at the 2010 UEFA Women's Under-17 Championship – First qualifying round against Denmark on 10 October 2009. She took part also at the 2011 UEFA Women's Under-17 Championship – First qualifying round. She was capped six times in total for the Turkey U-17 team.

She joined the Turkey women's national U-19 playing at the 2013 UEFA Women's U-19 Championship First qualifying round – Group 5 match against Norway on 20 October 2012. She was capped in two games.

=== Futsal ===
In 2018, she was a member of her alma mata's futsal team, which became champion of the Turkish Intra-University Women's Futsal Super League.

== Career statistics ==
As of 8 December 2019.

Club	Season	League			Continental		National		Total	
Club	Season	Division	Apps	Goals	Apps	Goals	Apps	Goals	Apps	Goals
Gölcükspor	2008–09	Second League	6	0	–	–	0	0	6	0
Gölcükspor	2009–10	Second League	17	1	–	–	5	0	22	1
Gölcükspor	2010–11	First League	19	1	–	–	1	0	20	1
Gölcükspor	Total		42	2	–	–	6	0	48	2
İzmit Belediyespor	2011–12	First League	16	4	–	–	0	0	16	4
İzmit Belediyespor	Total		16	4	–	–	0	0	16	4
İzmit Çenesuyu Plajyoluspor	2012–13	Second League	6	3	–	–	2	0	8	3
İzmit Çenesuyu Plajyoluspor	Total		6	3	–	–	2	0	8	3
Derince Belediyespor	2012–13	First League	7	1	–	–	0	0	7	1
Derince Belediyespor	2013–14	First League	14	2	–	–	0	0	14	2
Derince Belediyespor	Total		21	3	–	–	0	0	21	3
Kireçburnu Spor	2014–15	Second League	18	11	–	–	0	0	18	11
Kireçburnu Spor	2015–16	First League	15	6	–	–	0	0	15	6
Kireçburnu Spor	2016–17	First League	19	4	–	–	0	0	19	4
Kireçburnu Spor	Total		52	21	–	–	0	0	52	21
Kdz. Ereğli Belediye Spor	2017–18	First League	18	6	–	–	0	0	18	6
Kdz. Ereğli Belediye Spor	2018–19	First League	15	1	–	–	0	0	15	1
Kdz. Ereğli Belediye Spor	Total		33	7	–	–	0	0	33	7
Fatih Vatan Spor	2017–18	First League	7	2	–	–	0	0	7	2
Fatih Vatan Spor	Total		7	2	–	–	0	0	7	2
Career total			177	42	–	–	8	0	185	42

== Honours ==
Turkish Women's Second League

Gölcükspor
Winners (1): 2009–10

Kireçburnu Spor
Winners (1): 2014–15
