= Fanta Zara Kamaté =

Ivorian footballer

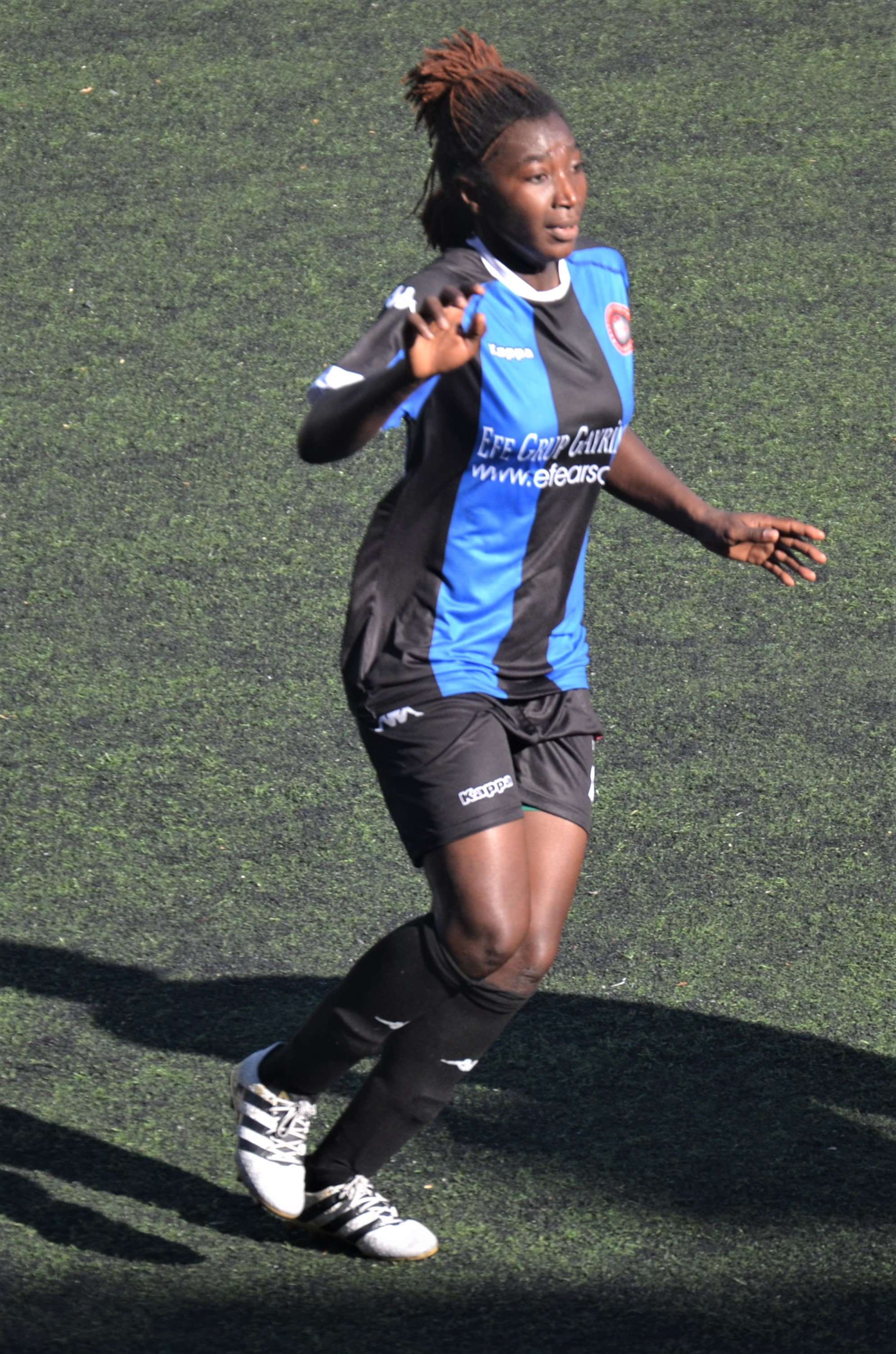
- Fanta Zara Kamate for Fatih Vatan Spor (October 2018)

Personal information
- Date of birth: 25 October 1995 (age 31)
- Place of birth: Ivory Coast
- Position: Forward

Senior career*
Years	Team	Apps	(Gls)
2018	1207 Antalyaspor	8	(1)
2018–2019	Fatih Vatan Spor	10	(0)
- * Club domestic league appearances and goals as of April 21, 2019

Fanta Zara Kamaté (25 October 1995) is an Ivorian women's football forward. She played in the Turkish Women's First League for Fatih Vatan Spor with jersey number 25.

== Playing career ==
=== Club ===
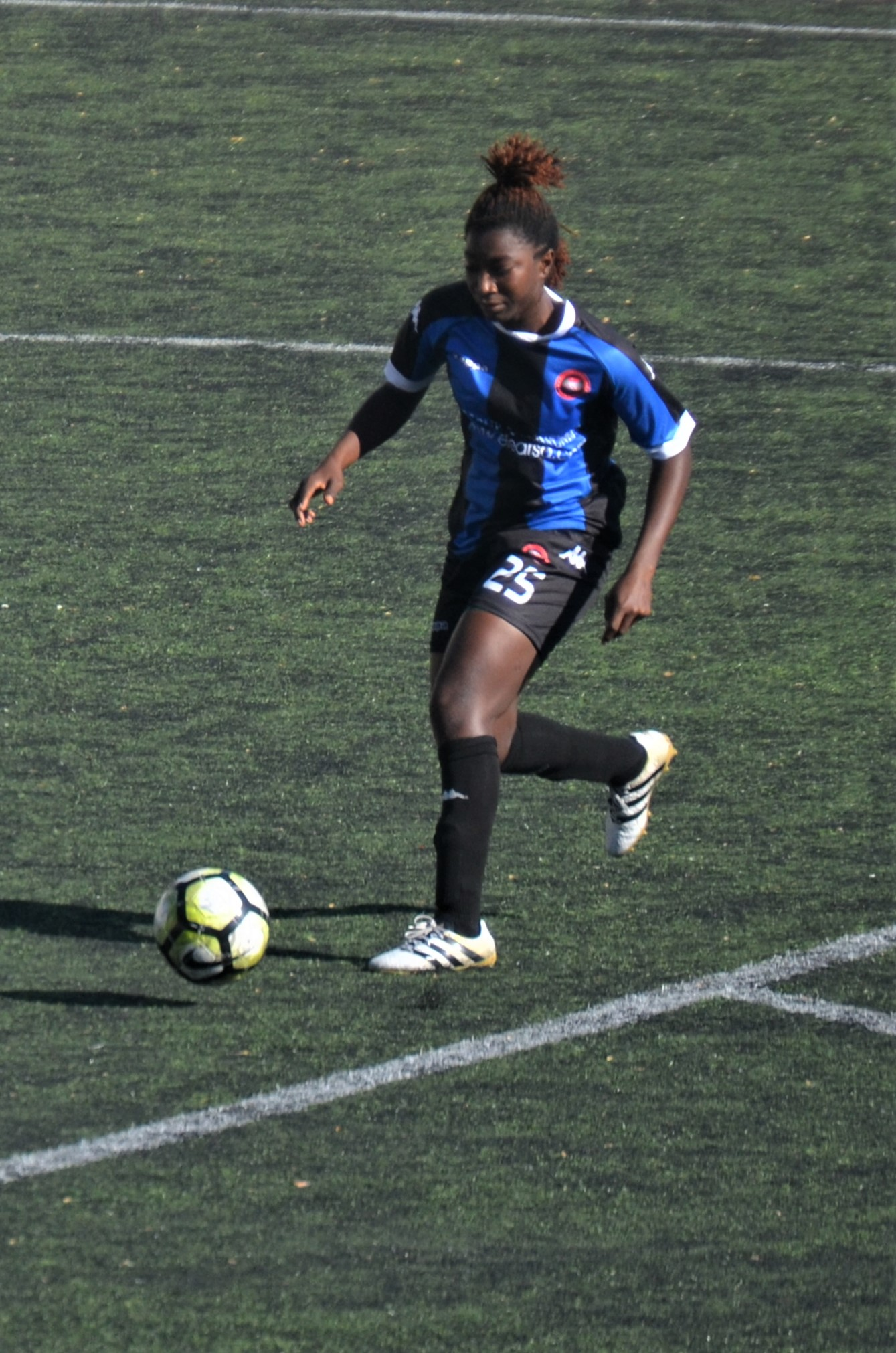
Fanta Zara Kamate playing for Fatih Vatan Spor in the 2018-19 Turkish Women's First Football League.

Kamate moved to Turkey and joined 1207 Antalya Döşemealtı Belediyespor in the second half of the 2017-18 Turkish Women's First Football League. She capped in eight matches and scored one goal.

After her team was relegated to the Women's Second Football League, she transferred to the Istanbul-based club Fatih Vatan Spor.

== Career statistics ==
As of match played April 21, 2019

Club	Season	League			Continental		National		Total	
Club	Season	Division	Apps	Goals	Apps	Goals	Apps	Goals	Apps	Goals
1207 Antalyaspor	2017–18	First League	8	1	–	–	0	0	8	1
1207 Antalyaspor	Total		8	1	–	–	0	0	8	1
Fatih Vatan Spor	2018–19	First League	10	0	–	–	0	0	10	0
Fatih Vatan Spor	Total		10	0	–	–	0	0	10	0
