= Serenay Aktaş =

Turkish actress and footballer

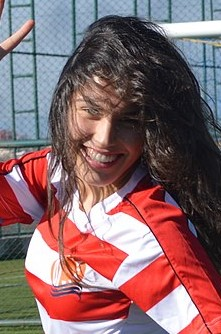
- Serenay Aktaş of 1207 Antalya Spor (February 2013)

Personal information
- Date of birth: 1 October 1993 (age 33)
- Place of birth: Bakırköy, Istanbul, Turkey
- Position: Forward

Senior career*
Years	Team	Apps	(Gls)
2008–2010	Zeytinburnuspor	23	(2)
2011–2012	Fatih Vatan Spor	12	(9)
2012–2014	1207 Antalya Spor	19	(24)
Total		54	(35)
- * Club domestic league appearances and goals as of 14 December 2014

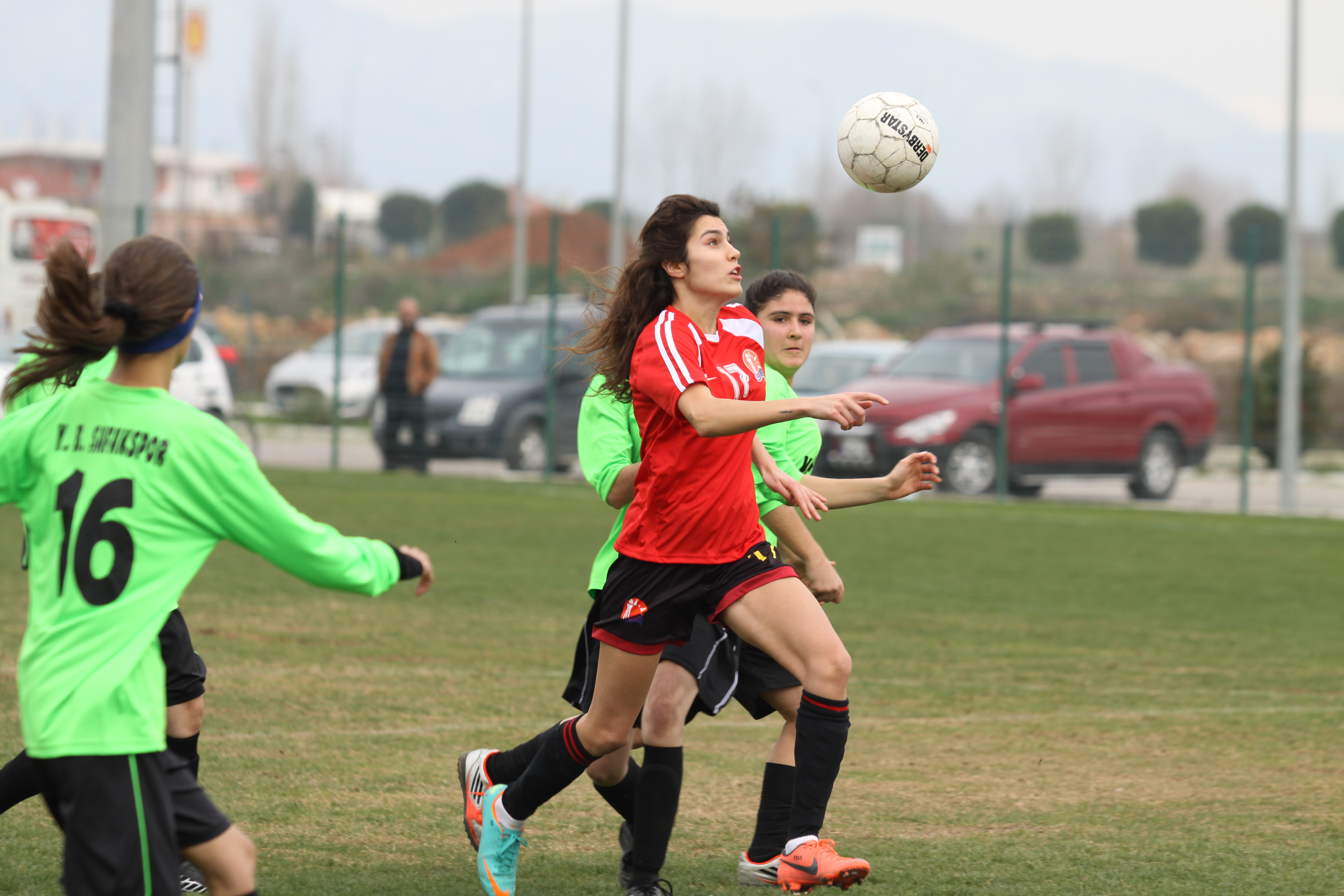
Serenay Aktaş (red/black) of 1207 Antalya Spor in the Women's Second League match. (February 2014)

Serenay Aktaş (born 1 October 1993) is a Turkish former women's football forward, and television series and film actress.

Serenay Aktaş was born in the Bakırköy district of Istanbul, Turkey on 1 October 1993.

== Sports career ==
She obtained her football license from Zeytinburnuspor on 9 October 2007. She began to play for Zeytinburnuspor in the 2008–09 Women's First League. The next season, her team was relegated to the Second League. In the beginning of the 2010–11 season, she stayed far from the field. In the beginning of the second half of that season, she moved to Fatih Vatan Spor to play in the Women's Regional League. She enjoyed her team's promotion to the Second League at the end of the 2010–11 season. In the 2012–13 Women's Second League season, she transferred to 1207 Antalya Spor. She left her club in Antalya after the first half of the 2014–15 Second League season, and returned to Istanbul and signed with then Third League-club Beşiktaş J.K. However, her contract was annulled due to her participation in the reality show Survivor Turkey as a competitor. She was capped in a total of 54 games and scored 35 goals in her career.

== Career statistics ==
As of match played 14 December 2014.

Club	Season	League			Continental		National		Total	
Club	Season	Division	Apps	Goals	Apps	Goals	Apps	Goals	Apps	Goals
Zeytinburnuspor	2008–09	First League	15	0	–	–	–	–	15	0
Zeytinburnuspor	2009–10	Second League	8	2	–	–	–	–	8	2
Zeytinburnuspor	Total		23	2	–	–	–	–	23	2
Fatih Vatan Spor	2010–11	Regional League	5	6	–	–	–	–	5	6
Fatih Vatan Spor	2011–12	Second League	7	3	–	–	–	–	7	
Fatih Vatan Spor	Total		12	9	–	–	–	–	12	9
1207 Antalya Spor	2012–13	Second League	10	12	–	–	–	–	10	12
1207 Antalya Spor	2013–14	Second League	7	12	–	–	–	–	7	12
1207 Antalya Spor	2014–15	Second League	2	0	–	–	–	–	2	0
1207 Antalya Spor	Total		19	24	–	–	–	–	19	24
Career total			54	35	–	–	–	–	54	35

== Acting career ==
=== Television series ===
In addition to her football career, she starred in a number of television series. She appeared for the first time in Kanıt (2010–2013). She had then guest appearances in television series like Türk Malı (2010), Yahşi Cazibe (2010), Kalbim Seni Seçti (2011–2012) and Alemin Kralı (2011–2013). Her main role was the character "Gülüm" in Arka Sıradakiler (2007–2011). The next year, she played the character "Ayşe Hatun" in one season of Muhteşem Yüzyıl (2013–2014). Her following roles included Acil Aşk Aranıyor (2015) and Gulumse yeter (2016).

=== Movies ===
Aktaş appeared in the movie Çılgın Dersane 3 (2014). She then became the starring character in the movie Figüran (2015),Yıldızlar da Kayar: Das Borak ("Stars Fall Too: Das Borak") (2016).

=== Reality show ===
In 2014, she participated in the celebrities team at Survivor Turkey – Celebrities vs Volunteers, where she was eliminated after 91 days. And in 2015, she competed in Survivor Turkey – All Star.

== Filmography ==
Year	Title	Role
Television series
2011	Türk Malı	(Guest star)
2011	Kanıt	(Guest star)
2011	Alemin Kralı	(Guest star)
2012	Arka Sıradakiler	Gülüm
2012	Kalbim Seni Seçti	Esra
2012	Yahşi Cazibe	Çalkara
2013	Muhteşem Yüzyıl	Ayşe Hatun
2014	Kaçak Gelinler	Pınat Yaymaz
2015	Acil Aşk Aranıyor	Zeynep
2016	Gülümse Yeter	Melis Özkan
2016	İlişki Durumu Karışık	Ceyda
2017	Meryem	Burcu Aktar
2021	Savaşçı	Lieutenant Selcen Efe
2021	Kalp Yarası	Ebru Karanfil
2022	Sevmek Zamanı	Leyla Kerimoğlu
Movies
2014	Çılgın Dersane 3	Merve
2015	Figüran	Pelin Şafak
2016	Makas	Berrak Yalçın
2016	Yıldızlar da Kayar: Das Borak	Zümray
2018	Dünya Hali	Masal
2019	Kim Daha Mutlu?	Şükran
2020	7 Melek	Kübra Doğanay
