= Emine Gümüş =

Turkish footballer (born 1992)

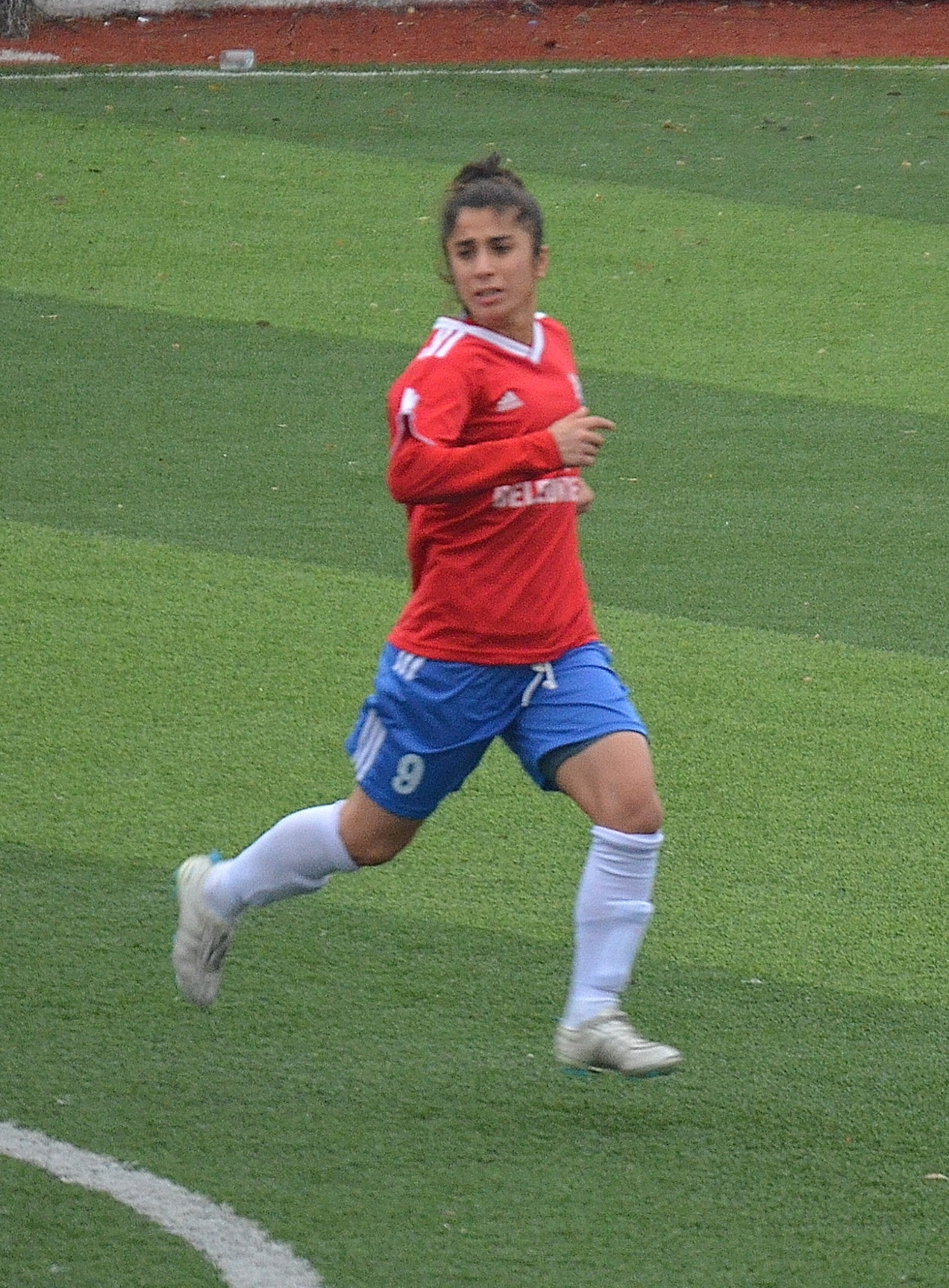
- Emine Gümüş for Adana İdmanyursuspor (November 2014).

Personal information
- Date of birth: July 12, 1992 (age 34)
- Place of birth: Mersin, Turkey
- Position: Forward

Team information
- Current team: Kdz. Ereğli Belediye Spor
- Number: 77

Senior career*
Years	Team	Apps	(Gls)
2006–2011	Mersin Camspor	54	(32)
2011–2017	Adana İdmanyurduspor	89	(50)
2017–2018	Kdz. Ereğlispor	18	(4)
2018–2019	Hakkarigücü Spor	6	(2)
2019–2020	Tavla G.S.	11	(21)
2021	Fomget G.S.	6	(0)
2021–2022	Çaykur Rizespor	20	(2)
2022–	Kdz. Ereğli Belediye Spor	1	(0)

International career^{‡}
2010	Turkey U-19	2	(0)
2014	Turkey	3	(0)
- * Club domestic league appearances and goals as of 16 October 2022 ‡ National team caps and goals as of 17 September 2014

Emine Gümüş (born July 12, 1992) is a Turkish women's football forward, who plays in the Women's Super League for Kdz. Ereğli Belediye Spor with jersey number 77. She is a member of the Turkey women's national team since 2014.

== Club career ==
Emine Gümüş obtained her license on 5 September 2006. She played for her hometown club Mersin Camspor in the Women's First and Second League. She transferred in the 2011–12 season to Adana İdmanyurduspor. After six seasons with Adana İdmanyurduspor, Gümüş moved to Kdz. Ereğlispor in the 2017-18 Turkish Women's First Football League. In October 2018, she transferred to the newly promoted First League club Hakkarigücü Spor. After appearing one season in the Women's Third League for Tavla Gençlikspor, she returned to the Women's First League with Fomget G.S. The next season, she transferred to the newly founded club Çaykur Rizespor to play in the 2021-22 Super League. After one season, she signed with her former club Kdz. Ereğli Belediye Spor.

== International career ==
Gümüş was called up to the Turkey women's national under-19 team for the friendly match against Russia on February 3, 2010. She capped twice for the women's junior team.

On May 7, 2014, she debuted at the 2015 FIFA Women's World Cup qualification – UEFA Group 6 match with the Turkey women's national team against Belarus.

== Career statistics ==
As of 16 October 2022.

Club	Season	League			Continental		National		Total	
Club	Season	Division	Apps	Goals	Apps	Goals	Apps	Goals	Apps	Goals
Mersin Camspor	2008–09	First League	16	9	–	–	0	0	16	9
Mersin Camspor	2009–10	First League	15	4	–	–	2	0	17	4
Mersin Camspor	2010–11	Second League	23	19	–	–	0	0	23	19
Mersin Camspor	Total		54	32	–	–	2	0	56	32
Adana İdmanyurduspor	2011–12	First League	12	10	–	–	0	0	12	10
Adana İdmanyurduspor	2012–13	First League	12	3	–	–	0	0	12	3
Adana İdmanyurduspor	2013–14	First League	12	11	–	–	2	0	14	11
Adana İdmanyurduspor	2014–15	First League	17	8	–	–	1	0	18	8
Adana İdmanyurduspor	2015–16	First League	15	10	–	–	0	0	15	10
Adana İdmanyurduspor	2016–17	First League	21	8	–	–	0	0	21	8
Adana İdmanyurduspor	Total		89	50	–	–	3	0	92	50
Kdz. Ereğlispor	2017–18	First League	18	4	–	–	0	0	18	4
Kdz. Ereğlispor	Total		18	4	–	–	0	0	18	4
Hakkarigücü Spor	2018–19	First League	6	2	–	–	0	0	6	2
Hakkarigücü Spor	Total		6	2	–	–	0	0	6	2
Tavla G.S.	2019–20	Third League	11	21	–	–	0	0	11	21
Tavla G.S.	Total		11	21	–	–	0	0	11	21
Fomget G.S.	2020–21	First League	6	0	–	–	0	0	6	0
Fomget G.S.	Total		6	0	–	–	0	0	6	0
Çaykur Rizespor	2021–22	Super League	20	2	–	–	0	0	20	0
Çaykur Rizespor	Total		20	2	–	–	0	0	20	2
Kdz. Ereğli Belediye Spor	2022–23	Super League	1	0	–	–	0	0	1	0
Kdz. Ereğli Belediye Spor	Total		1	0	–	–	0	0	1	0
Career total			205	111	–	–	5	0	210	111
