= Nagehan Akşan =

Turkish footballer (born 1988)

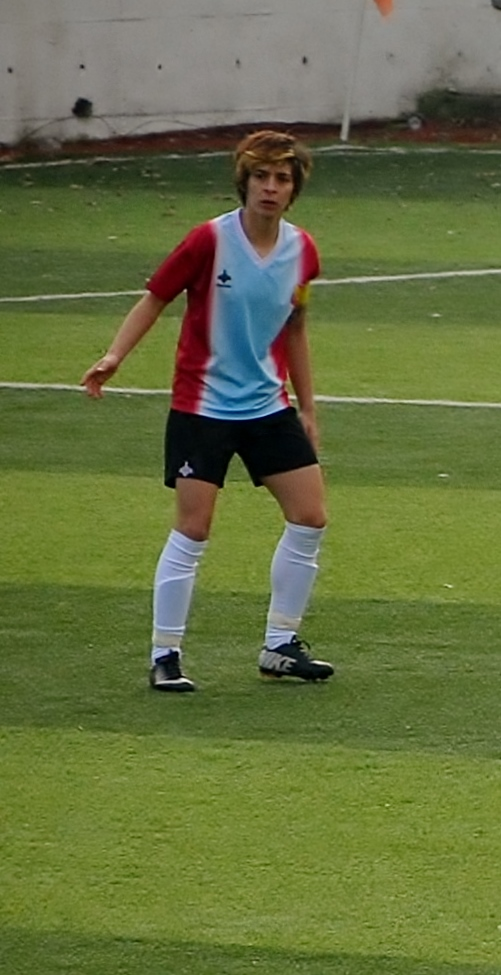
- Nagehan Akşan for Trabzon İdmanocağı in the 2014–15 season.

Personal information
- Date of birth: February 22, 1988 (age 38)
- Place of birth: Trabzon, Turkey
- Position: Defender

Team information
- Current team: Ünye
- Number: 19

Senior career*
Years	Team	Apps	(Gls)
2008–2010	Trabzon	32	(2)
2010–2011	Maltepe Yalı	19	(0)
2011–2017	Trabzon İdmanocağı	109	(3)
2017–2018	Kdz. Ereğli	16	(0)
2018–2021	Ataşehir	34	(1)
2021–2022	Çaykur Rize	6	(0)
2022–2023	Ataşehir	15	(3)
2023	Amed	1	(0)
2023–2024	Gaziantep Asya	14	(0)
2024–2025	ALG	10	(0)
2025–	Ünye	29	(1)

International career^{‡}
2009	Turkey	3	(0)
- * Club domestic league appearances and goals as of 14 November 2026 ‡ National team caps and goals as of 16 May 2009

Nagehan Akşan (born February 22, 1988) is a Turkish women's football defender who plays in the Women's Super League for ALG with jersey number 61. She was a member of the Turkish national team.

== Club career ==
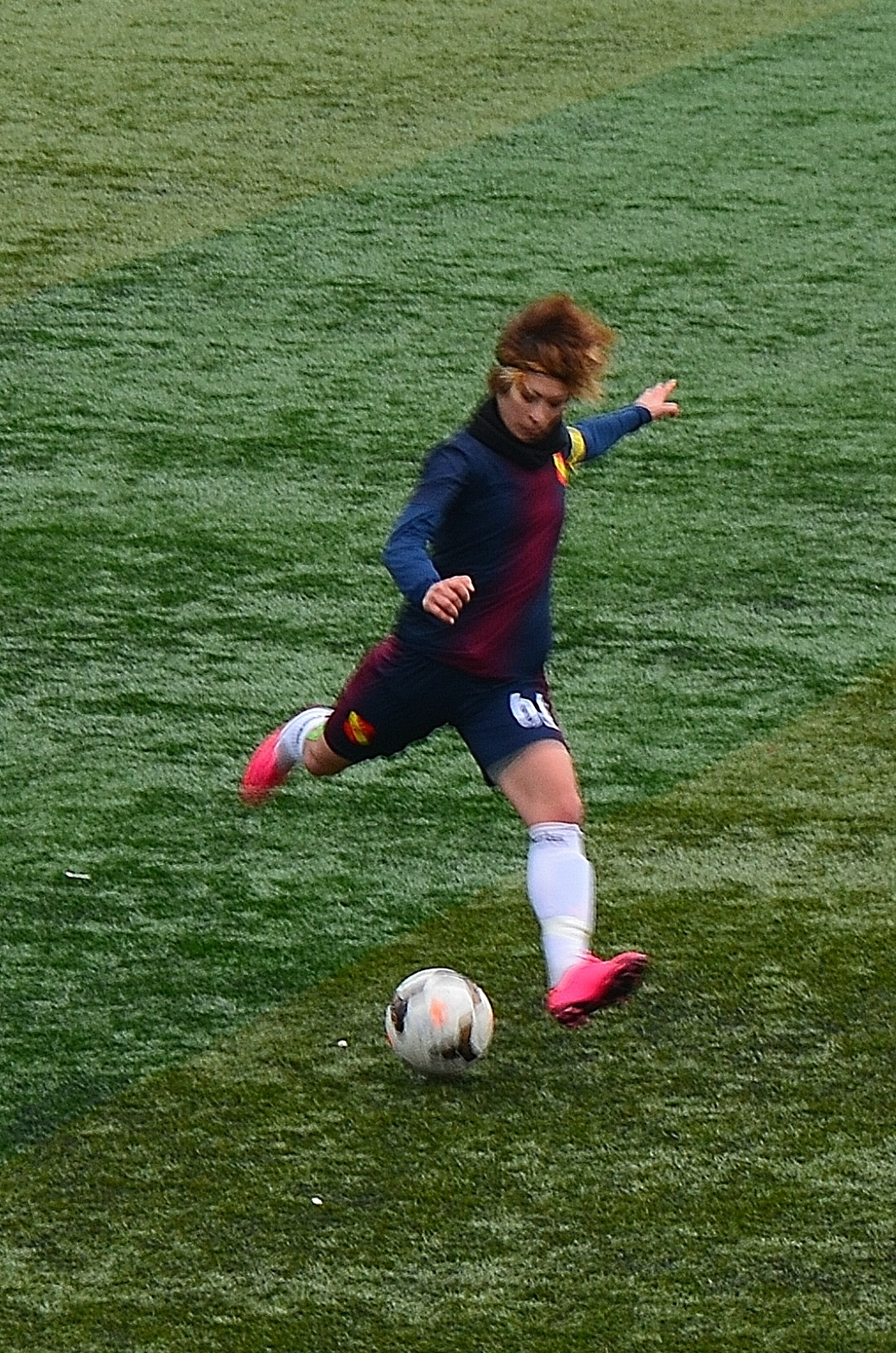
Nagehan Akşan playing for Trabzon İdmanocağı in the 2015–16 season.

Nagehan Akşan obtained her license for her hometown club Trabzonspor on November 16, 2007. After playing 32 matches and scoring two goals in two seasons, she transferred to Maltepe Yalı in Istanbul. She capped 19 times and scored an own goal for Yalıspor in the 2010–11 season. For the 2011–12 season, she returned to Trabzon to join the Trabzon İdmanocağı, where she still plays.

At the end of the 2008–09 season, her team Trabzonspor became the league champion, and was entitled to play in the UEFA Women's Champions League as the first Turkish team debuting. Akşan took part at the 2009–10 UEFA Women's Champions League – Group D matches.

Akşan transferred to Kdz. Ereğli for the 2017–18 season.

On June 1, 2018, she signed with the Istanbul-based club Ataşehir before the 2017–18 league champion club's participation at the 2018–19 UEFA Women's Champions League qualifying round. She played in all three matches of the qualification round. In the 2018–19 league season, she was appointed captain of the team.

For the 2021–22 Turkcell Women's Super League season, she transferred to the newly founded team Çaykur Rize. In the 2022–23 Super League season, she returned to her former club Ataşehir Beşediyespor. The next season, she transferred to Amed in Diyarbakır. However, after playing one match only, she moved to Gazianterp Asya. In the 2024–25 Super League season, she joined ALG in Gaziantep.

For the 2025–26 Super League season, she transferred Ünye.

== International career ==
In 2009, she was admitted to the Turkey women's national team to play in three matches of the UEFA Support International Tournament. At the 2011 FIFA Women's World Cup qualification – UEFA Group 5, she was member of the national team. However, she sat on the bench.

== Career statistics ==
As of 14 November 2026

Club	Season	League			Continental		National		Total	
Club	Season	Division	Apps	Goals	Apps	Goals	Apps	Goals	Apps	Goals
Trabzon	2008–09	First League	15	0	–	–	3	0	18	0
Trabzon	2009–10	First league	17	2	3	0	0	0	20	2
Trabzon	Total		32	2	3	0	3	0	38	2
Maltepe Yalı	2010–11	First League	19	0	–	–	0	0	19	0
Trabzon İdmanocağı	2011–12	First League	21	0	–	–	0	0	21	0
Trabzon İdmanocağı	2012–13	First League	18	0	–	–	0	0	18	0
Trabzon İdmanocağı	2013–14	First League	13	0	–	–	0	0	13	0
Trabzon İdmanocağı	2014–15	First League	16	0	–	–	0	0	16	0
Trabzon İdmanocağı	2015–16	First League	17	2	–	–	0	0	17	2
Trabzon İdmanocağı	2016–17	First League	24	1	–	–	0	0	24	1
Trabzon İdmanocağı	Total		109	3	–	–	0	0	109	3
Kdz. Ereğli	2017–18	First League	16	0	–	–	0	0	16	0
Ataşehir	2018–19	First League	14	0	3	0	0	0	17	0
Ataşehir	2019–20	First League	16	1	-	-	0	0	16	1
Ataşehir	2020–21	First League	4	0	–	–	0	0	4	0
Ataşehir	Total		34	1	3	0	0	0	37	1
Çaykur Rize	2021–22	Super League	6	0	–	–	0	0	6	0
Ataşehir	2022–23	Super League	15	3	–	–	0	0	15	3
Amed	2023–24	Super League	1	0	–	–	0	0	1	0
Gaziantep Asya	2023–24	Super League	14	0	–	–	0	0	14	0
ALG	2024–25	Super League	10	0	–	–	0	0	10	0
Ünye	2025–26	Super League	21	0	–	–	0	21	0	
Ünye	2026–27	Super League	8	1	–	–	0	0	8	1
Ünye	Total		29	1	-	-	0	0	29	1
Career total			285	9	7	0	3	0	294	10

== Honours ==
Turkish Women's First League

Trabzonspor
Winners (1): 2008–09
Runners-up (1): 2009–10

Trabzon İdmanocağı
Third places (3): 2011–12, 2014–15, 2015–16
