= Joshguna Aliyeva =

Azerbaijani footballer (born 2002)

Personal information
- Date of birth: 22 March 2002 (age 24)
- Position: Midfielder

Team information
- Current team: Kireçburnu Spor
- Number: 21

Senior career*
Years	Team	Apps	(Gls)
- Balxurma
2021–2022	Kdz. Ereğli Belediye Spor	18	(2)
2022-2024	Kireçburnu Spor	4	(0)
2024-	Neftçi PFK	25	(53)

International career^{‡}
2017–2018	Azerbaijan U17	8	(0)
2019–	Azerbaijan U19	1	(0)
2020–	Azerbaijan	1	(0)
- * Club domestic league appearances and goals as of 16 November 2022 ‡ National team caps and goals as of 11 March 2020

Joshguna Aliyeva (Azerbaijani: Coşqunə Əliyeva; born 22 March 2002) is an Azerbaijani footballer, who plays as a midfielder for Turkish Women's Super League club Kireçburnu Spor and the Azerbaijan women's national team. Aliyeva has also represented the Azerbaijan U17 and U19 teams.

== Club career ==
In December 2021, Aliyeva moved to Turkey and joined Kdz. Ereğli Belediye Spor to play in the Turkish Women's Super League. In the 2022-23 Turkish Super League season, she transferred to Kireçburnu Spor.

== See also ==
- List of Azerbaijan women's international footballers
