= Kamilla Mammadova =

Azerbaijani footballer (born 1996)

Personal information
- Date of birth: 31 August 1996 (age 30)
- Height: 1.62 m (5 ft 4 in)
- Position: Defender

Team information
- Current team: Şırnak Belediyegücü SFK

Senior career*
Years	Team	Apps	(Gls)
- Ugur FC
2017	Adana İdman Yurdu	11	(1)
2021–2022	Kdz. Ereğli Belediye Spor	20	(5)
2022–2023 = 2021–	Adana İdman Yurdu	18	(1)
2023	Gaziantep Asya S.K.	7	(0)
2024–	Şırnak Belediyegücü SFK		

International career^{‡}
2017–2018	Azerbaijan U17	8	(0)
2019–	Azerbaijan U19	1	(0)
2020–	Azerbaijan	1	(0)
- * Club domestic league appearances and goals as of 10 January 2024 ‡ National team caps and goals as of 11 March 2020

Kamilla Mammadova (Azerbaijani: Kamilla Məmmədova; born 31 August 1996) is an Azerbaijani football defender, who plays for Şırnak Belediyegücü SFK in the Turkish Women's First League and the Azerbaijan women's national team.

== Club career ==
Mammadova played for Ugur FC in her country. Mid February 2017, she moved to Turkey, and signed with Adana İdman Yurdu. Mid December 2021, she went to Turkey again, and joinedKdz. Ereğli Belediye Spor to play in the Turkish Women's Super League. In the 2022–23 Super League season, she transferred to her former club Adana İdman Yurdu.

For the 2023–24 Turkish Super League season, she transferred to Gaziantep Asya S.K., which was recently promoted to the top-level league.

In the second half of the 2023–24 Super League season, she moved to Şırnak Belediyegücü SFK to play in the Turkish First League, which is the second-tear şeague.

== See also ==
- List of Azerbaijan women's international footballers
