= Teona Bakradze =

Georgian footballer (born 1996)

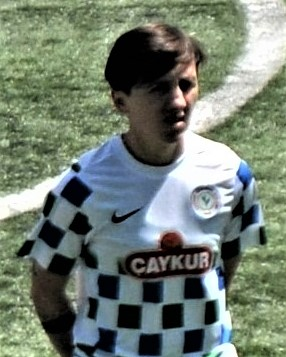
- Bakradze with Çaykur Rizespor in 2022

Personal information
- Date of birth: January 24, 1996 (age 30)
- Place of birth: Chkhorotsqu, Georgia
- Position: Forward

Team information
- Current team: Trabzonspor
- Number: 7

Senior career*
Years	Team	Apps	(Gls)
2015–2016	FC Hereti Lagodekhi		
2016–2018	Kdz. Ereğlispor	39	(23)
2018–2020	Hakkarigücü Spor	24	(21)
2021–2022	Çaykur Rizespor	22	(13)
2022–2023	Amed	14	(11)
2023–	Trabzonspor	22	(9)

International career^{‡}
2014–2015	Georgia U19	6	(0)
2016–	Georgia	39	(10)
- * Club domestic league appearances and goals as of 4 June 2024 ‡ National team caps and goals as of 4 June 2024

Teona Bakradze (Georgian: თეონა ბაქრაძე, born January 24, 1996) is a Georgian footballer who plays as a forward for Turkish Women's Super League club Trabzonspor and the Georgia national team.

== Club career ==
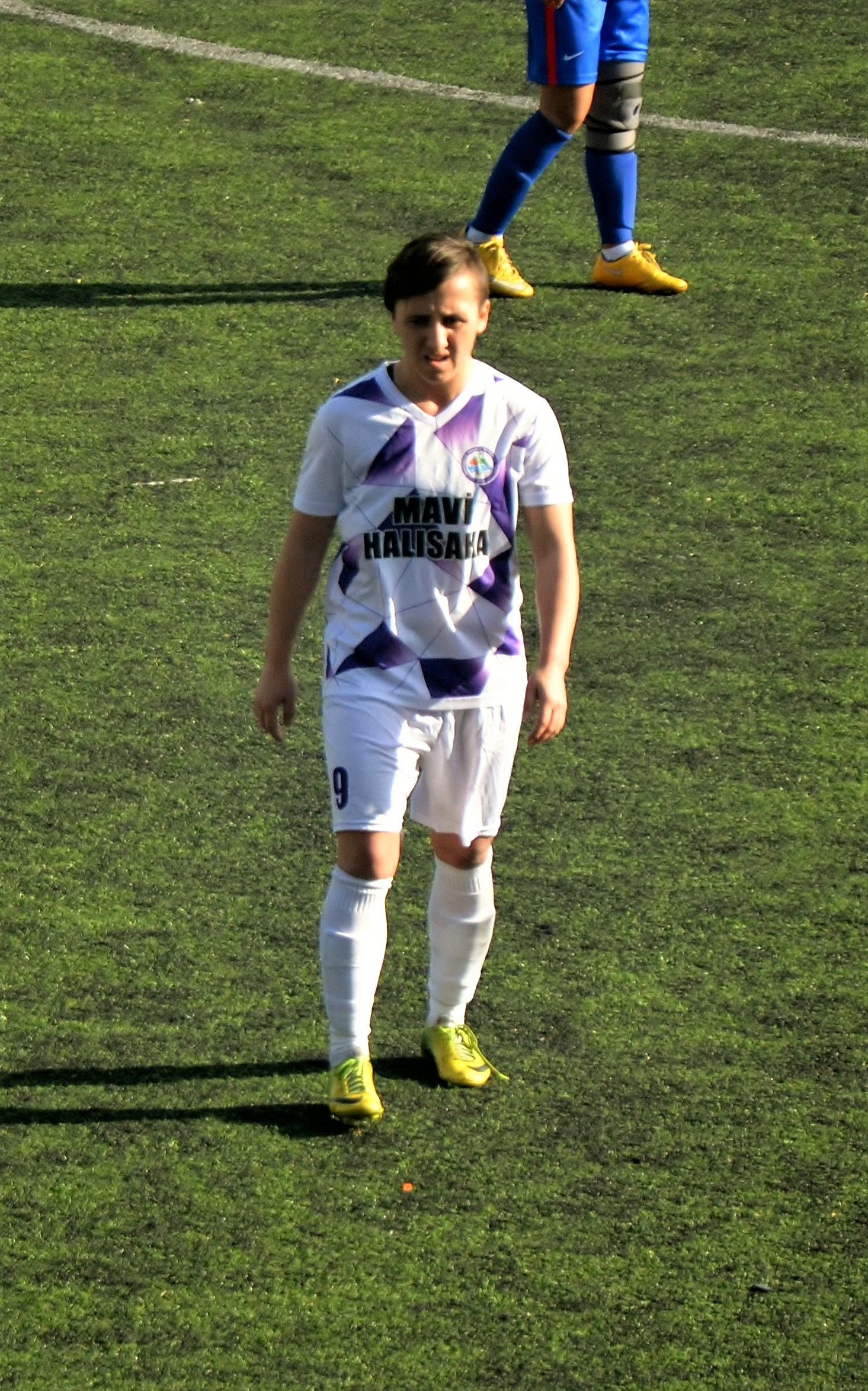
Teona Bakradze of Kdz. Ereğlispor in the 2017-18 Turkish Women's First Football League.

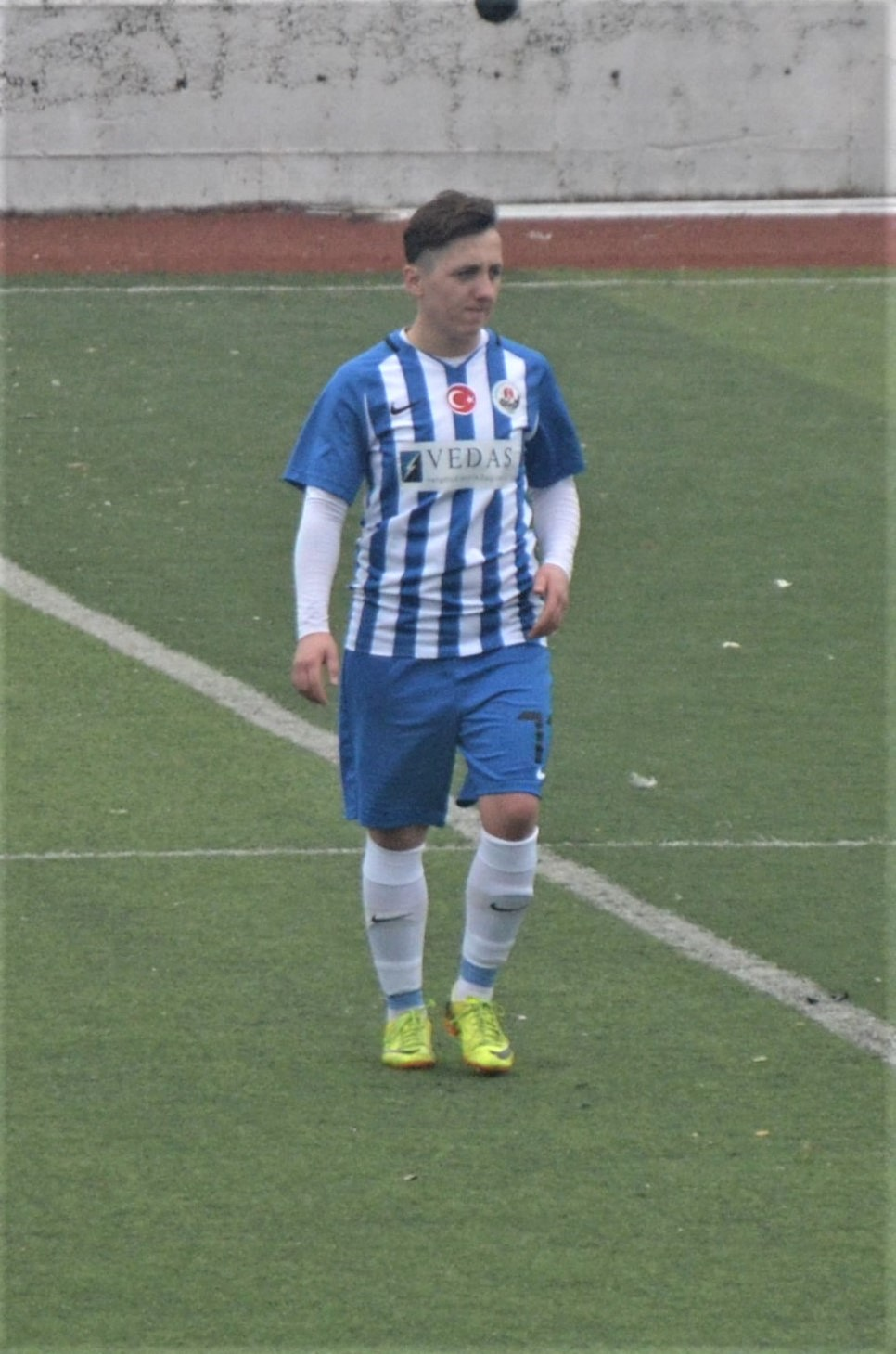
Teona Bakradze of Hakkarigücü Spor in the 2018–19 Turkish Women's First League.

She played for FC Hereti Lagodekhi in Georgia, before she moved to Turkey in November 2016, and joined Kdz. Ereğlispor to play in the Turkish Women's First Football League.

In the 2018–19season, she transferred to the newly promoted First League club Hakkarigücü Spor.

For the 2021–22 Women's Super League season, Bakradze transferred to |Çaykur Rizespor. After one season, she signed with the Diyarbakır-based club Amed S. F.K.

== International career ==
Bakradze appeared for Georgia women's national football team in four matches at the UEFA Women's Euro 2017 qualifying Group 6 in 2016 and in three matches at the 2019 FIFA Women's World Cup qualification – UEFA preliminary round Group 1 in 2017.

== Career statistics ==
As of 1 June 2024

Club	Season	League			Continental		National		Total	
Club	Season	Division	Apps	Goals	Apps	Goals	Apps	Goals	Apps	Goals
FC Hereti Lagodekhi	2015–16				–	–	3	0	3	0
FC Hereti Lagodekhi	Total				–	–	3	0	3	0
Kdz. Ereğlispor	2016–17	First League	22	16	–	–	4	0	26	16
Kdz. Ereğlispor	2017–18	First League	17	7	–	–	0	0	17	7
Kdz. Ereğlispor	Total		39	23	–	–	4	0	43	23
Hakkarigücü Spor	2018–19	First League	10	10	–	–	0	0	10	10
Hakkarigücü Spor	2019–20	First League	14	11	–	–			14	11
Hakkarigücü Spor	Total		24	21	–	–	0	0	24	21
Çaykur Rizespor	2021–22	Super League	22	13	–	–	0	0	22	13
Çaykur Rizespor	Total		22	13	–	–	0	0	22	13
Amed	2022–23	Super League	14	11	–	–	0	0	14	11
Amed	Total		14	11	–	–	0	0	14	11
Trabzonspor	2023-24	Super League	25	9					25	9
Career total			124	77	–	–	7	0	131	77

== International goals ==
Scores and results list Bakradze's goal tally first.

No.	Date	Venue	Opponent	Score	Result	Competition
1.	14 June 2019	Davit Petriashvili Stadium, Tbilisi, Georgia	United Arab Emirates	1–0	5–1	Friendly
2.	27 October 2020	Mikheil Meskhi Stadium, Tbilisi, Georgia	Israel	1–2	1–2	UEFA Women's Euro 2022 qualifying
3.	11 June 2021	GFF Technical Center Basa, Tbilisi, Georgia	Azerbaijan	1–0	3–2	Friendly
4.	13 July 2023	Mikheil Meskhi Stadium, Tbilisi, Georgia	Armenia	3–0	5–0	Friendly
5.	16 July 2023	Mikheil Meskhi Stadium, Tbilisi, Georgia	Armenia	1–0	3–1	Friendly
6.	1 December 2023	Mikheil Meskhi Stadium, Tbilisi, Georgia	Luxembourg	1–2	4–2	2023–24 UEFA Women's Nations League
7.	5 April 2024	Mikheil Meskhi Stadium, Tbilisi, Georgia	Lithuania	1–0	2–2	UEFA Women's Euro 2025 qualifying
8.	5 April 2024	Mikheil Meskhi Stadium, Tbilisi, Georgia	Lithuania	2–0	2–2	UEFA Women's Euro 2025 qualifying
9.	31 May 2024	Dasaki Stadium, Dasaki Achnas, Cyprus	Cyprus	2–0	2–0	UEFA Women's Euro 2025 qualifying
10.	4 June 2024	Mikheil Meskhi Stadium, Tbilisi, Georgia	Cyprus	1–0	1–0	UEFA Women's Euro 2025 qualifying
11.	21 February 2025	Mikheil Meskhi Stadium, Tbilisi, Georgia	Andorra	1–1	2–1	2025 UEFA Women's Nations League
12.	4 April 2025	Mikheil Meskhi Stadium, Tbilisi, Georgia	Malta	1–3	2–3	2025 UEFA Women's Nations League
