= Yeliz Açar =

Turkish and Azerbaijani footballer (born 1997)

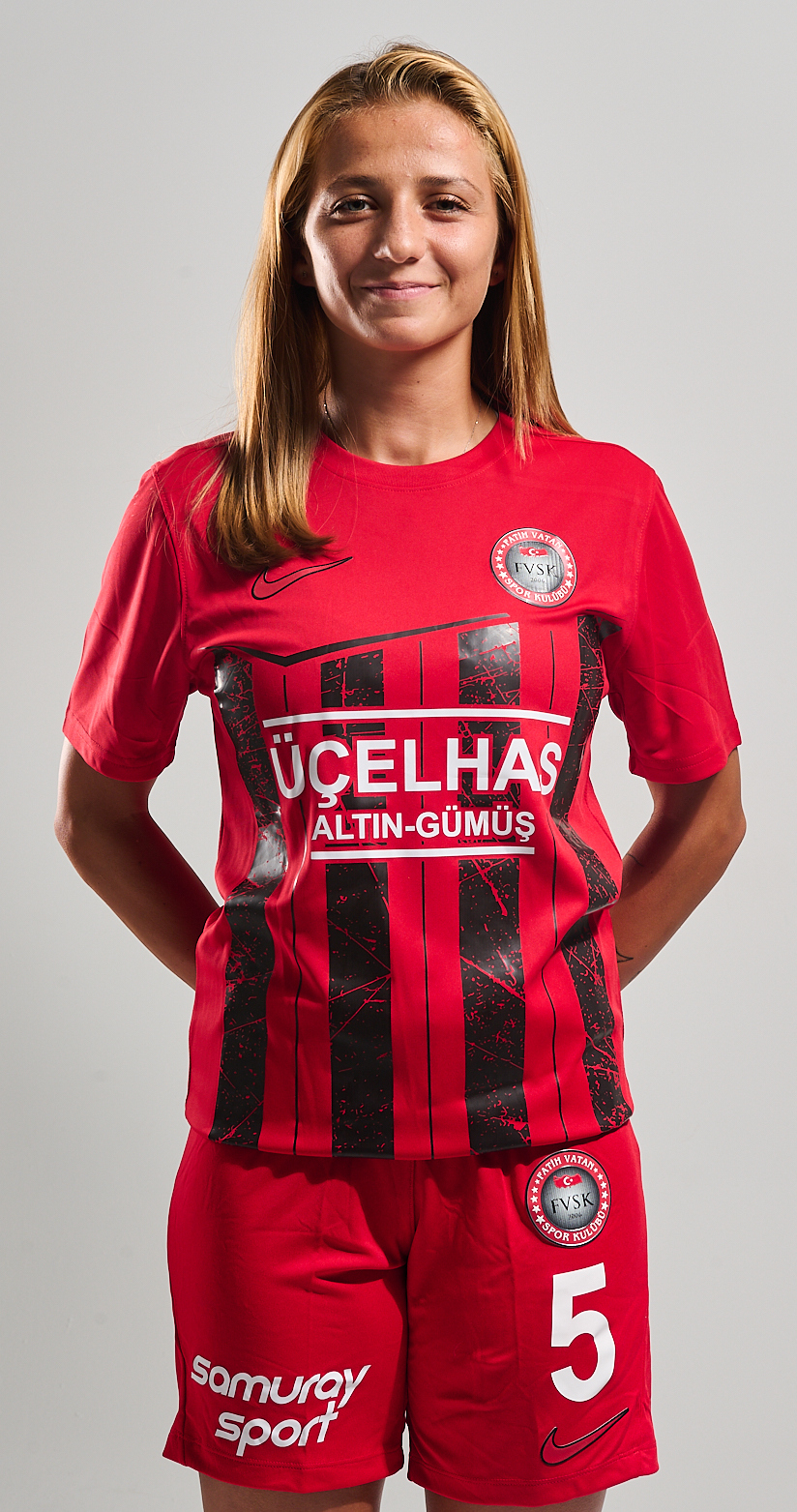
- Açar with Fatih Vatan in 2023

Personal information
- Date of birth: 19 December 1997 (age 28)
- Place of birth: Fatih, Istanbul, Turkey
- Height: 1.64 m (5 ft 5 in)
- Position: Defender

Team information
- Current team: Fatih Vatan Spor
- Number: 5

Senior career*
Years	Team	Apps	(Gls)
2011–2013	Akdeniz Nurçelik Spor	6	(3)
2013–2014	Kdz. Ereğlispor	2	(0)
2014–2017	Beşiktaş	41	(3)
2017–	Fatih Vatan	129	(2)

International career^{‡}
2013	Turkey U-17	1	(0)
2019–	Azerbaijan	7	(0)
- * Club domestic league appearances and goals as of 15 December 2024 ‡ National team caps and goals as of 30 November 2021

Yeliz Açar (born 19 December 1997) is a women's football defender who plays for Turkish Super League club Fatih Vatan. Born in Turkey, she represents Azerbaijan internationally. She previously played for her country of birth women's national under-17 team.

== Club career ==
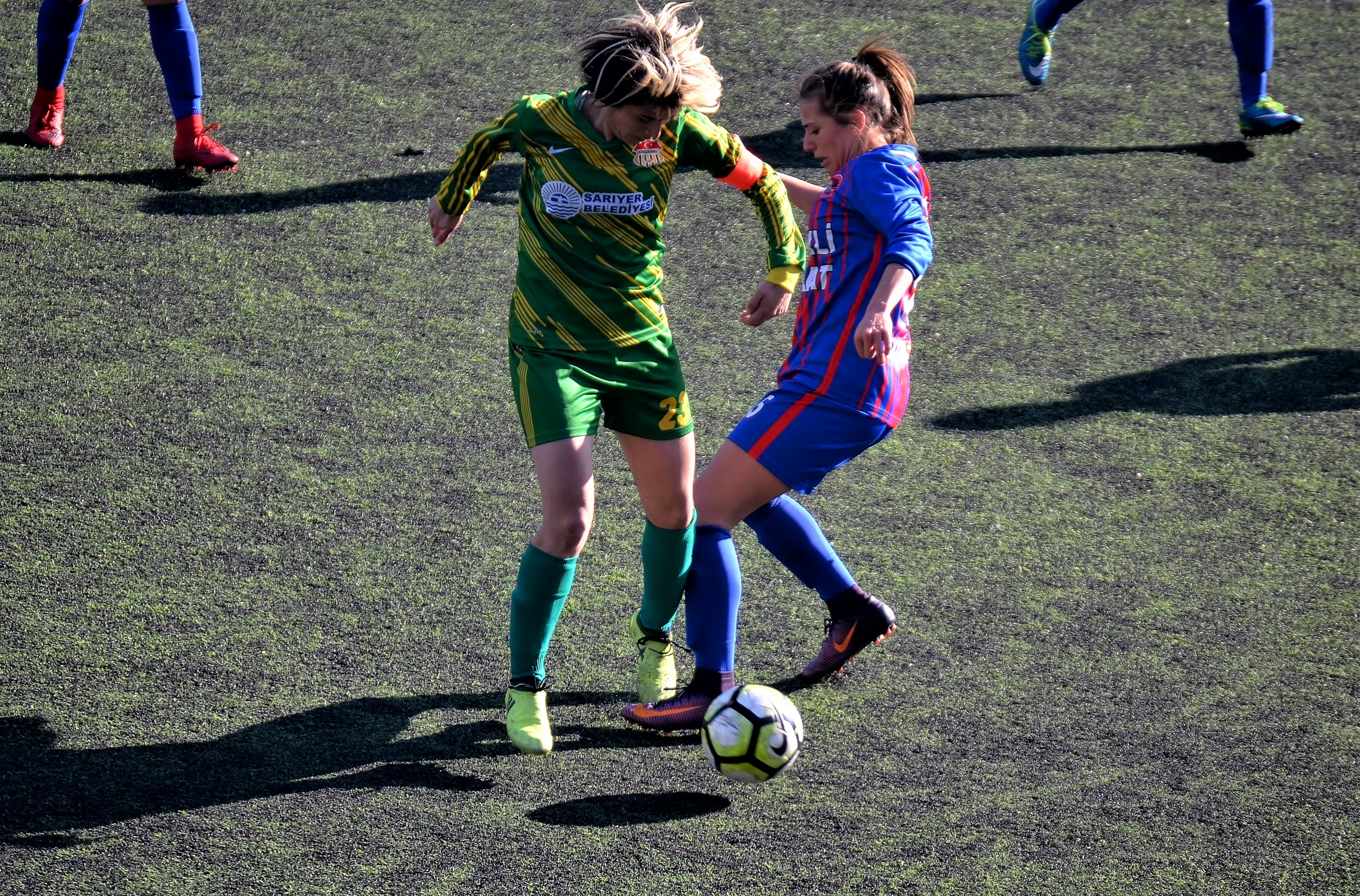
Yeliz Açar (right) of Fatih Vatan Spor challenging Merve Aladağ from Kireçburnu Spor in the 2017–18 Women's First League season.

Açar obtained her license from Zeytinburnu Spor on 19 March 2010. She made her debut in the 2011–12 Women's Second League season for Istanbul Nurçelik Spor, which was renamed the next season Akdeniz Nurçelik Spor. She then signed with Lüleburgaz 39 Spor in September 2013. However, her club withdrew from the league, and according to the Turkish Football Federation's regulation, she was not allowed to transfer to any other club in the 2013–14 season. In the second half of that season, she moved to Kdz. Ereğlispor to play in the 2013–14 Women's First League. After a brief appearance in Karadeniz Ereğli, she returned to Istanbul and joined Beşiktaş J.K. in the Turkish Women's Third Football League. At the end of the 2014–15 season, she enjoyed her team's promotion to the Women's Second League, and the next season her team's promotion to the Women's First League. After three seasons, she signed with Fatih Vatan Spor to play in the 2017–18 Women's First league.

== International career ==
=== Turkey ===
Açar was a member of the Turkey girls' U-17 team in a friendly match against Switzerland in March 2013.

=== Azerbaijan ===
Açar became a member of the Azerbaijan women's national football team. Açar played in three matches of the UEFA Women's Euro 2022 qualifying Group D, and three matches of the 2023 FIFA Women's World Cup qualification – UEFA Group E.

== Career statistics ==
As of match played on 15 December 2024.

Club	Season	League			Continental		National		Total	
Club	Season	Division	Apps	Goals	Apps	Goals	Apps	Goals	Apps	Goals
Istanbul Nurçelik	2011–12	Second League	1	0	–	–	0	0	1	0
Akdeniz Nurçelik	2012–13	Second League	6	3	–	–	1	0	7	3
Kdz. Ereğli	2013–14	First League	2	0	–	–	0	0	2	0
Beşiktaş	2014–15	Third League	16	3	–	–	0	0	16	3
Beşiktaş	2015–16	Second League	18	0	–	–	0	0	18	0
Beşiktaş	2016–17	First League	7	0	–	–	0	0	7	0
Beşiktaş	Total		41	3	–	–	0	0	41	3
Fatih Vatan	2017–18	First League	17	1	–	–	0	0	17	1
Fatih Vatan	2018–19	First League	16	0	–	–	0	0	16	0
Fatih Vatan	2019–20	First League	13	0	–	–	0	0	13	0
Fatih Vatan	2020–21	First League	6	0	–	–	4	0	10	0
Fatih Vatan	2021–22	Super League	23	1	–	–	3	0	26	1
Fatih Vatan	2022–23	Super League	17	0	–	–	0	0	17	0
Fatih Vatan	2023–24	Super League	28	0	–	–	0	0	28	0
Fatih Vatan	2024–25	Super League	9	0	–	–	0	0	9	0
Fatih Vatan	Total		129	2	–	–	7	0	136	2
Career total			178	8	–	–	8	0	186	8

== International goals ==
No.	Date	Venue	Opponent	Score	Result	Competition
1.	18 April 2026	Bank Respublika Arena, Absheron, Azerbaijan	Andorra	1–0	2–0	2027 FIFA Women's World Cup qualification

== Honours ==
Turkish Women's First Football League

Beşiktaş J.K.
Runners-up (1): 2016–17

Fatih Vatan Spor
Runners-up /1): 2020–21

Turkish Women's Second Football League

Beşiktaş J.K.
Winners (1): 2015–16

Turkish Women's Third Football League

Beşiktaş J.K.
Winners (1): 2014–15

== See also ==
- List of Azerbaijan women's international footballers
