= Mislina Gözükara =

Azerbaijani footballer (born 1997)

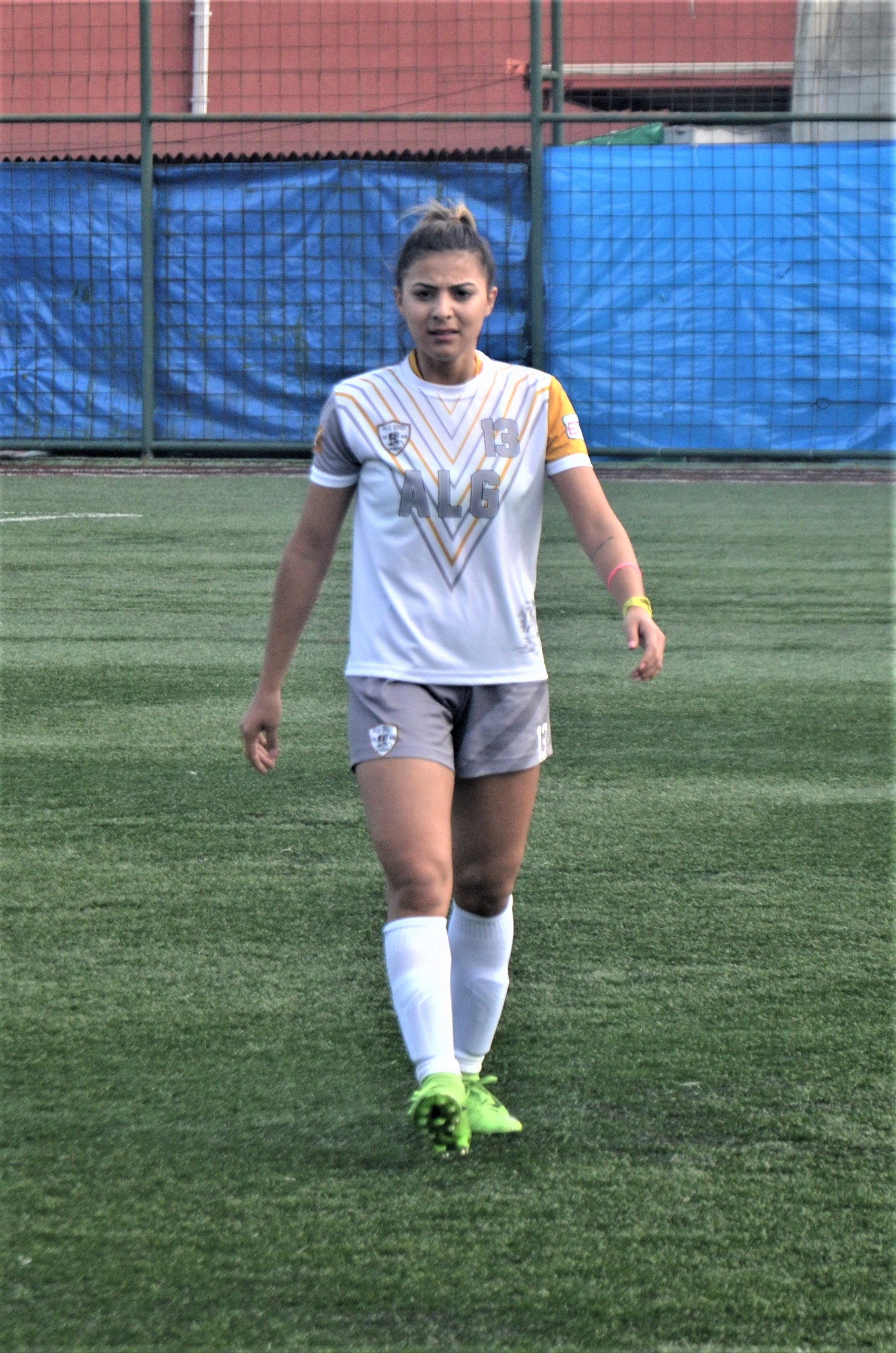
- Mislina Gözükara playing for ALG Spor (November 2018).

Personal information
- Date of birth: 20 December 1997 (age 28)
- Place of birth: Kahramanmaraş, Turkey
- Position: Forward

Team information
- Current team: Ünye
- Number: 7

Senior career*
Years	Team	Apps	(Gls)
2012–2017	Maraşgücü	66	(102)
2017–2020	ALG	46	(19)
2020–2021	Fatih Vatan	1	(0)
2021-2022	Çaykur Rizespor	20	(1)
2022	Konak	9	(1)
2023	Nuh	4	(0)
2023	Şırnak	11	(4)
2023-2025	Ünye	35	(3)
2025	Gaziantes	3	(2)
2025	Siverek Rosk	4	(4)

International career
2020–	Azerbaijan	2	(0)
- * Club domestic league appearances and goals

Mislina Gözükara (born 20 December 1997) is a Turkish-born Azerbaijani women's football forward who plays for the Turkish Super League club Ünye, and the Azerbaijan national team.

== Club career ==
Gözükara obtained her license on 23 October 2012 from Maraşgücüspor, the first women's football club established in her hometown by a female football coach a few months earlier, and started in the 2012–13 league season. She played from their first season on five seasons in the Second League and Third league, scoring 102 goals in 66 matches. She scored her 100th goal in her 60th match on 4 December 2016. She served as captain of her team. In the 2017–18 season, she transferred to the Gaziantep-based ALG Spor, playing in the Second League. At the end of the season, her team earned promotion to the First League.

In early August 2020, Gözükara transferred to the Istanbul-based club Fatih Vatan Spor. In September 2020, she underwent a surgery due to rupture of the cruciate ligament she suffered during training.

For the 2021-22 Turkcell Women's Super League season, Gözükara transferred to the newly formed team Çaykur Rizespor. In the first half of the 2022-23 Turkish Super League season, she played for Konak Belediyespor in İzmir. She moved in the second half of the 2022-23 First League season to the Diyarbakır-based Turkish First League-club Nuh Spor. After four games, she transferred to Şırnak Belediyespor in the same season. In the 2023–24 season, she transferred to Ünye, which were promoted to the Turkish Super League at the end of the season.

== International career ==
Gözükara was called up to the Turkey women's U-19 team in January 2015.

In 2020, Gözükara was called up to the Azerbaijan women's national team. She debuted in the UEFA Women's Euro 2021 qualifying Group D match against Poland on 11 March 2020.

== Career statistics ==
Club	Season	League			Continental		National		Total	
Club	Season	Division	Apps	Goals	Apps	Goals	Apps	Goals	Apps	Goals
Maraşgücü	2012–13	Second League	12	3	–	–	0	0	12	3
Maraşgücü	2013–14	Second league	14	19	–	–	0	0	14	19
Maraşgücü	2014–15	Third League	11	8	–	–	0	0	11	8
Maraşgücü	2015–16	Third league	19	68	–	–	0	0	19	68
Maraşgücü	2016–17	Second league	10	4	–	–	0	0	10	4
Maraşgücü	Total		66	102	–	–	0	0	66	102
ALG	2017–18	Second League	18	11	–	–	0	0	18	11
ALG	2018–19	First League	15	5	–	–	0	0	15	5
ALG	2019–20	First League	13	3	–	–	1	0	14	3
ALG	Total		46	19	–	–	1	0	47	19
Fatih Vatan	2020–21	First League	1	0	–	–	0	0	1	0
Çaykur Rizespor	2021–22	Super League	20	1	–	–	0	0	20	1
Konak	2022–23	Super League	9	1	–	–	0	0	9	1
Nuh	2022–23	First League	4	0	–	–	0	0	4	0
Şırnak	2022–23	First League	11	4	–	–	0	0	11	4
Ünye	2023-24	First League	21	3					21	3
Ünye	2024-25	Super League	14	0					14	0
Ünye	Total		35	3					35	3
Gaziantes	2024-25	Turkish Women's Football Second League	3	2					3	2
Siverek Rosk	2025-26	Turkish Women's Football First League	4	4					4	4
Career total			199	136	–	–	1	0	200	136

== Honours ==
Turkish Women's First League

ALG
Runners-up (1): 2018–19

Fatih Vatan
Runners-up (1): 2020–21

Ünye
Winners (1): 2023–24

Turkish Women's Second League

Maraşgücüspor
Winners (1): 2017–18

Turkish Women's Third League

Maraşgücüspor
Winners (1): 2015–16

== See also ==
- List of Azerbaijan women's international footballers
