= Ayshan Ahmadova =

Azerbaijani footballer (born 2000)

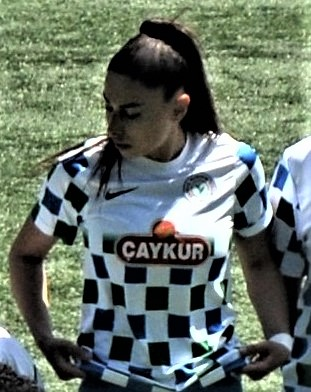
- Ayshan Ahmadova of Çaykur Rizespor (May 2022)

Personal information
- Date of birth: 5 May 2000 (age 26)
- Place of birth: Azerbaijan
- Height: 1.72 m (5 ft 8 in)
- Position: Defender

Team information
- Current team: Amed
- Number: 5

Senior career*
Years	Team	Apps	(Gls)
- Okzhetpes
2021	ALG	6	(0)
2021–2022	Çaykur Rizespor	20	(1)
2022–2023	Ankara BB Fomget	4	(0)
2023–2024	PAOK	14	(0)
2025	Ünye Kadın	8	(0)
2025–	Amed	1	(0)

International career^{‡}
2015–2016	Azerbaijan U17	6	(0)
2017–2018	Azerbaijan U19	8	(0)
2020–	Azerbaijan	1	(0)
- * Club domestic league appearances and goals as of 28 September 2025 ‡ National team caps and goals as of 11 March 2020

Ayshan Ahmadova (Azerbaijani: Ayşən Əhmədova; born 5 May 2000) is an Azerbaijani footballer who plays as a defender for PAOK in the Greek A Division and the Azerbaijan women's national team. She has also represented the Azerbaijan U17 and U19 teams.

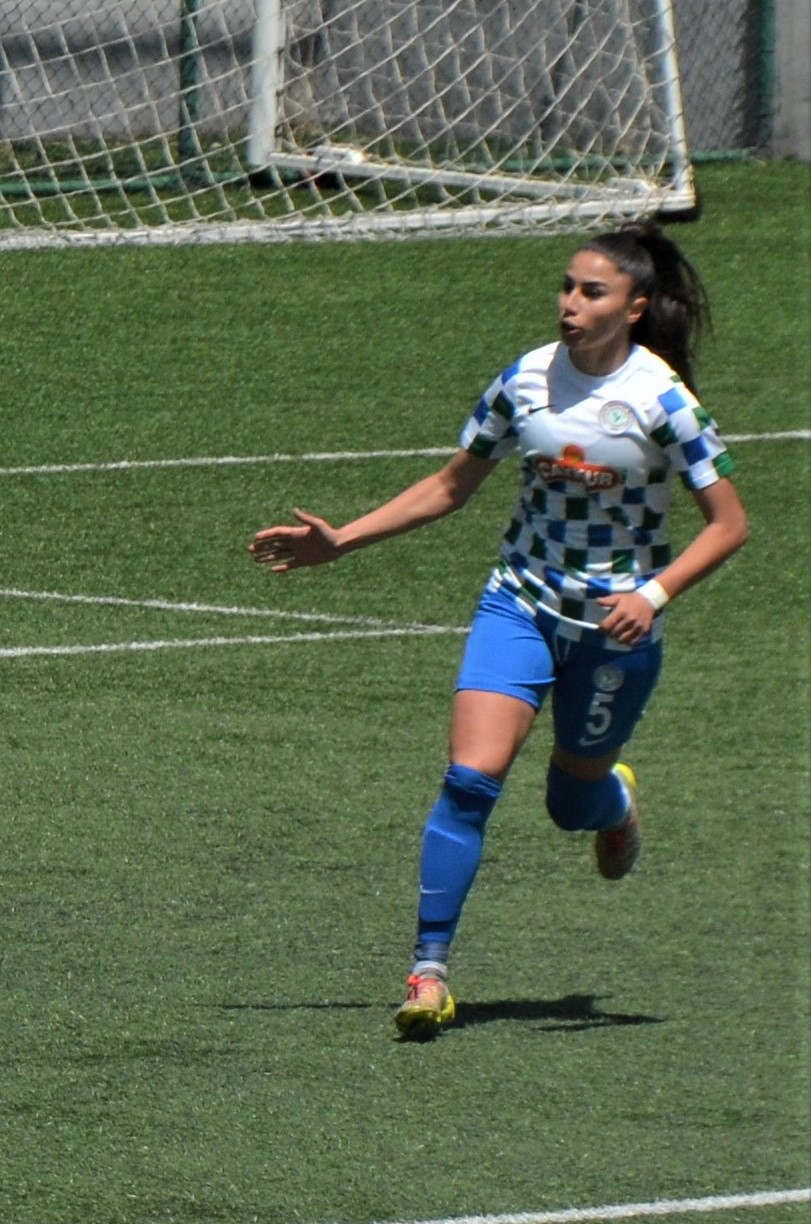
Ayshan Ahmadova of Çaykur Rizespor in the 2021-22 Turkish Women's Football Super League.

== Club career ==
In April 2021, Ahmadova moved to Turkey, and joined the Gaziantep-based club ALG Spor to play in the 2020–21 Turkish Women's Football League. The next season, she transferred to Çaykur Rizespor. In October 2022, she signed with Ankara BB Fomget GS.

In January 2025, she returned Turkey and joined Ünye Kadın to play in the second half of the 2024–25 Super League season.

She transferred to Amed in Diyarbakır in September 2025.

== International goals ==
No.	Date	Venue	Opponent	Score	Result	Competition
1.	11 June 2021	GFF Training Center Basa, Tbilisi, Georgia	Georgia	2–3	2–3	Friendly
2.	30 November 2021	Dalga Arena, Baku, Azerbaijan	Montenegro	1–0	1–0	2023 FIFA Women's World Cup qualification

== See also ==
- List of Azerbaijan women's international footballers
