= Vusala Seyfatdinova =

Azerbaijani footballer (born 2000)

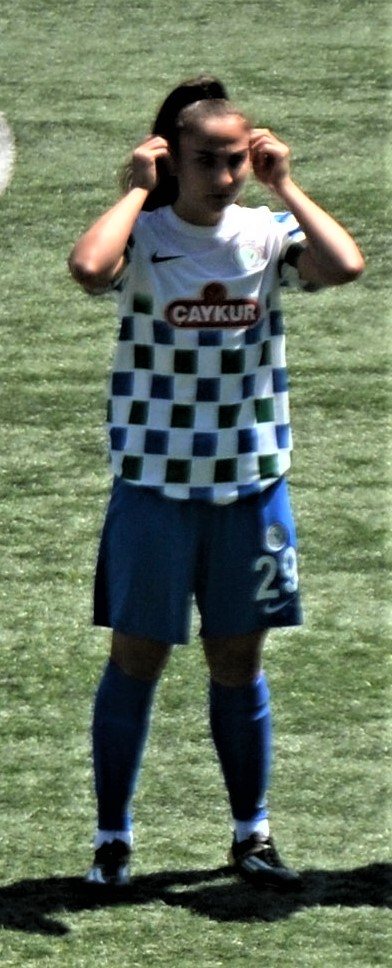
- Vusala Seyfatdinova of Çaykur Rizespor (May 2022)

Personal information
- Full name: Azerbaijani: Vüsalə Seyfətdinova
- Date of birth: 11 March 2000 (age 26)
- Place of birth: Azerbaijan,
- Height: 1.70 m (5 ft 7 in)
- Position: Midfielder

Team information
- Current team: Amed S.F.K.
- Number: 77

Senior career*
Years	Team	Apps	(Gls)
2019	Ryazan	3	(0)
2021	ALG Spor	6	(0)
2022	Çaykur Rizespor	12	(1)
2022–23	Adana İdman Yurdu	6	(0)
2023–2024	Amed S.F.K.	5	(0)
2024	Olimpiada Imittou	0	(0)
2024	Neftçi	0	(0)

International career^{‡}
2015–2016	Azerbaijan U17	5	(0)
2017–2018	Azerbaijan U19	9	(2)
2019–	Azerbaijan	3	(0)
- * Club domestic league appearances and goals as of 29 January 2023 ‡ National team caps and goals as of 10 November 2019

Vusala Seyfatdinova (Azerbaijani: Vüsalə Seyfətdinova, born 11 March 2000) is an Azerbaijani footballer, who plays as a midfielder for Neftçi PFK in the Azerbaijani women's football championship and the Azerbaijan women's national team.

== Club career ==
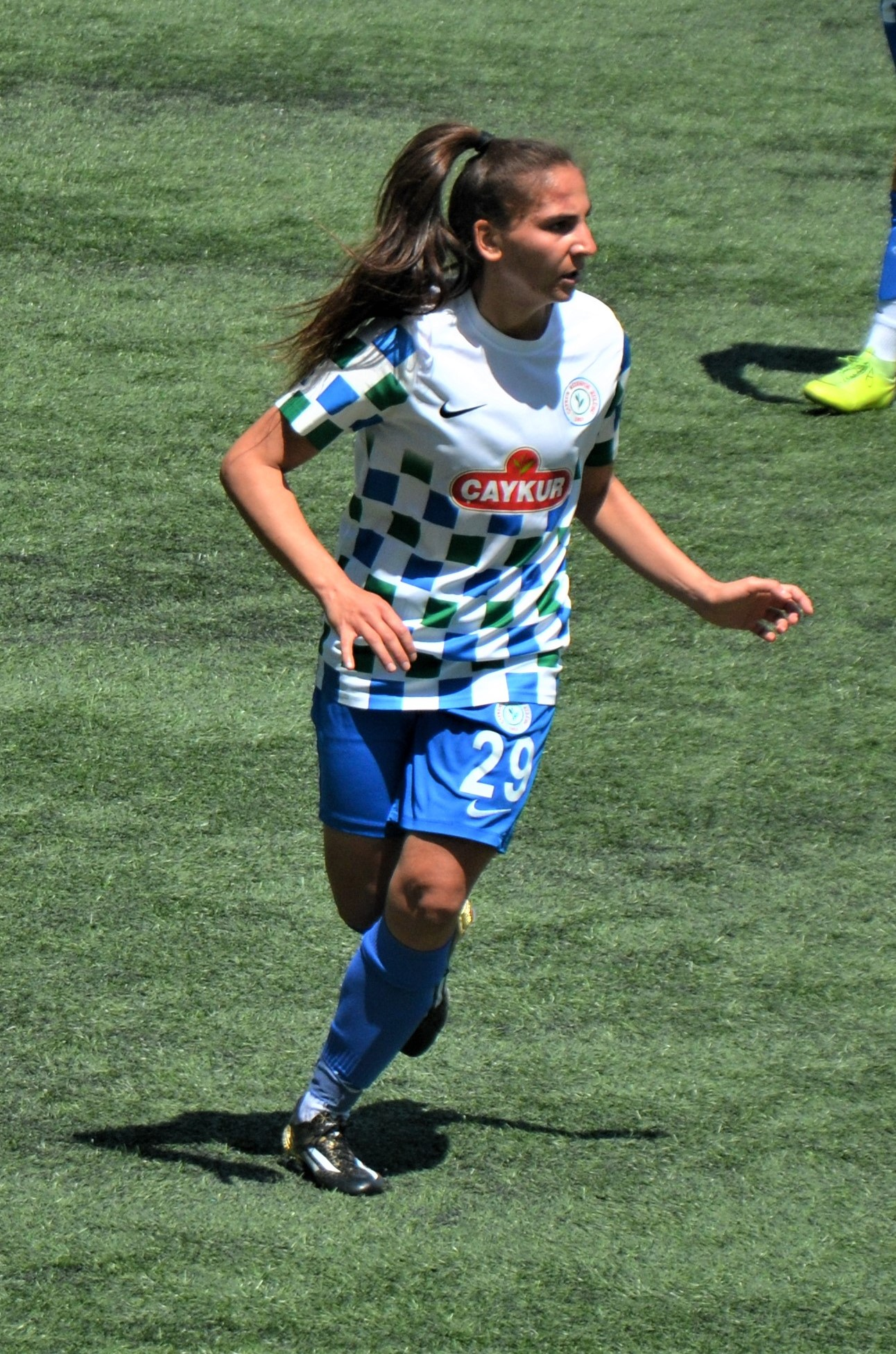
Vusala Seyfatdinova of Çaykur Rizespor in the 2021-22 Turkish Women's Football Super League.

By October 2020, she moved to Turkey, and joined the 2019–20 Women's First League top club ALG Spor in Gaziantep, which were entitled to play in the 2020–21 UEFA Women's Champions League qualifying rounds. She played in the first qualifying round against the Albanian team KFF Vllaznia Shkodër in Shkodër, Albania on 3 November 2020, and scored one goal.

In February 2022, Seyfatdinova transferred to Çaykur Rizespor to play in the second half of the 2021–22 Turkish Super League. In the first half of the 2022–23 Turkish Super League season, she was with Adana İdman Yurdu. She then moved to Amed S.F.K. to play in the 2022–23 Super League.

On September 2, 2024, she was transferred to Neftchi, competing in the Azerbaijani women's football championship.

International goals
Date	Venue	Opponent	Competition	Result	Scored
ALG Spor
November 3, 2020	Loro Boriçi Stadium, BShkodër, Albania	(Albania) Vllaznia	2020–21 UEFA Women's Champions League qualifying round	L 3–3 (a.e.t.) (3–2 p)	1

== International goals ==
No.	Date	Venue	Opponent	Score	Result	Competition
1.	26 October 2021	ASK Arena, Baku, Azerbaijan	Malta	1–2	1–2	2023 FIFA Women's World Cup qualification
2.	20 February 2022	Dalga Arena, Baku, Azerbaijan	United Arab Emirates	3–0	4–0	Friendly

== See also ==
- List of Azerbaijan women's international footballers
