= List of Azerbaijan women's international footballers =

This is a non-exhaustive list of Azerbaijan women's international footballers – association football players who have appeared at least once for the senior Azerbaijan women's national football team.

== Players ==
Key
**Bold**	Named to the national team in the past year

Name	Caps	Goals	National team years	Club(s)
Ayruz Abmammadova	1	0	2010	Retired
**Yeliz Açar**	7	0	2019–	(Turkey) Fatih Vatan Spor
**Ayshan Ahmadova**	4	0	2020–	(Kazakhstan) Okzhetpes
**Aysun Aliyeva**	8	1	2017–	Unknown
**Joshguna Aliyeva**	5	0	2020–	(Azerbaijan) Marxal
Konul Asadova	5	0	2010	Retired
Khayala Azizova	1	0	2010	Retired
**Kristina Bakarandze**	7	0	2019–	Unknown
Tamila Bayramova	1	0	2010	Retired
Alfiya Bigbulatova	1	0	2010	Retired
Neslihan Bozkaya	1	0	2020–	(Turkey) Kemer FK
**Alina Dorofeeva**	8	1	2019–	(Russia) Yenisey
Aygun Girkhlarova	3	0	2010	Retired
**Mislina Gözükara**	1	0	2020–	(Turkey) Fatih Vatan Spor
Irada Guliyeva	5	0	2010	Retired
**Roza Guliyeva**	2	0	2019–	(Kazakhstan) Okzhetpes
Gulyana Guvandiyeva	3	0	2010	Retired
**Nargiz Hajiyeva**	8	0	2019–	Unknown
**Vusala Hajiyeva**	7	0	2019–	(Russia) Izhevsk
Sevinj Jafarzade	5	0	2010–2019	(Russia) Krasnodar
Zhala Mahsimova	6	0	2019–	(Russia) Zenit
**Diana Mammadova**	4	0	2019–	(Russia) Yenisey
**Kamilla Mammadova**	4	0	2020–	(Azerbaijan) Ugur
**Nigar Mirzaliyeva**	7	0	2019–	(Russia) Rubin Kazan
Male Mollayeva	3	0	2019	Unknown
Mahsati Musayeva	2	0	2010	Retired
**Nazlıcan Parlak**	6	0	2019–	(Romania) Piroș Security
**Sona Rahimova**	2	0	2020–	(Azerbaijan) 8 - İOEUGiM
**Vusala Seyfatdinova**	7	0	2019–	(Turkey) ALG Spor
**Aytaj Sharifova**	8	0	2019–	Unknown
**Firangiz Teymurova**	2	0	2021–	(Azerbaijan) Ugur

== See also ==
- Azerbaijan women's national football team
