= Aryana Harvey =

American soccer player (born 1997)

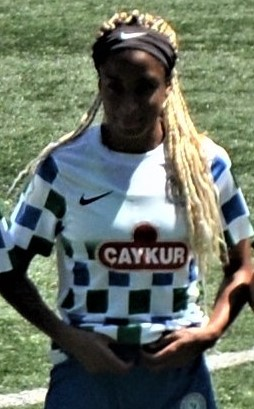
- Aryana Harvey of Çaykur Rizespor (May 2022)

Personal information
- Full name: Aryana Lynn Harvey
- Date of birth: April 2, 1997 (age 29)
- Place of birth: Tualatin, Oregon, USA
- Height: 5 ft 7 in (1.70 m)
- Positions: Defender; midfielder

Team information
- Current team: Giresun Sanayi
- Number: 44

Youth career
- 2011–2015: Tualatin High School

College career
Years	Team	Apps	(Gls)
2015–2016	Pfeiffer Falcons	19	(9)
2017–2019	Cal State Bakersfield Roadrunners	55	(7)

Senior career*
Years	Team	Apps	(Gls)
2019	So Cal Union FC		
2020–2021	Damaiense	9	(1)
2022	Çaykur Rizespor	11	(4)
2022–2023	Fatih Vatan Spor	11	(0)
2023–2024	Pomigliano CF		
2024–	Cesena		
2025–	Giresun Sanayi	2	(0)
- * Club domestic league appearances and goals as of October 5, 2025

Aryana Lynn Harvey (born April 2, 1997) is an American professional soccer player who plays as a defender for Giresun Sanayi in the Turkish Super League.

== Early years ==
Aryana Lynn Harvey was born to Antonio Harvey and Kim Starr Harvey in Tualatin, Oregon, United States on April 2, 1997. She is the niece of Richard Harvey.

She started playing soccer on the school team during her high school years in her hometown between 2011 and 2015. She played for the college team of Pfeiffer Falcons at Misenheimer, North Carolina in 2016. She scored 9 goals in 19 matches. Between 2017 and 2019, she played for the college team of CSU Bakersfield Roadrunners, where she appeared in 55 games and scored 7 goals and 9 assists. She changed position from defensive midfielder to forward in her final two seasons at Cal State Bakersfield.

== Club career ==
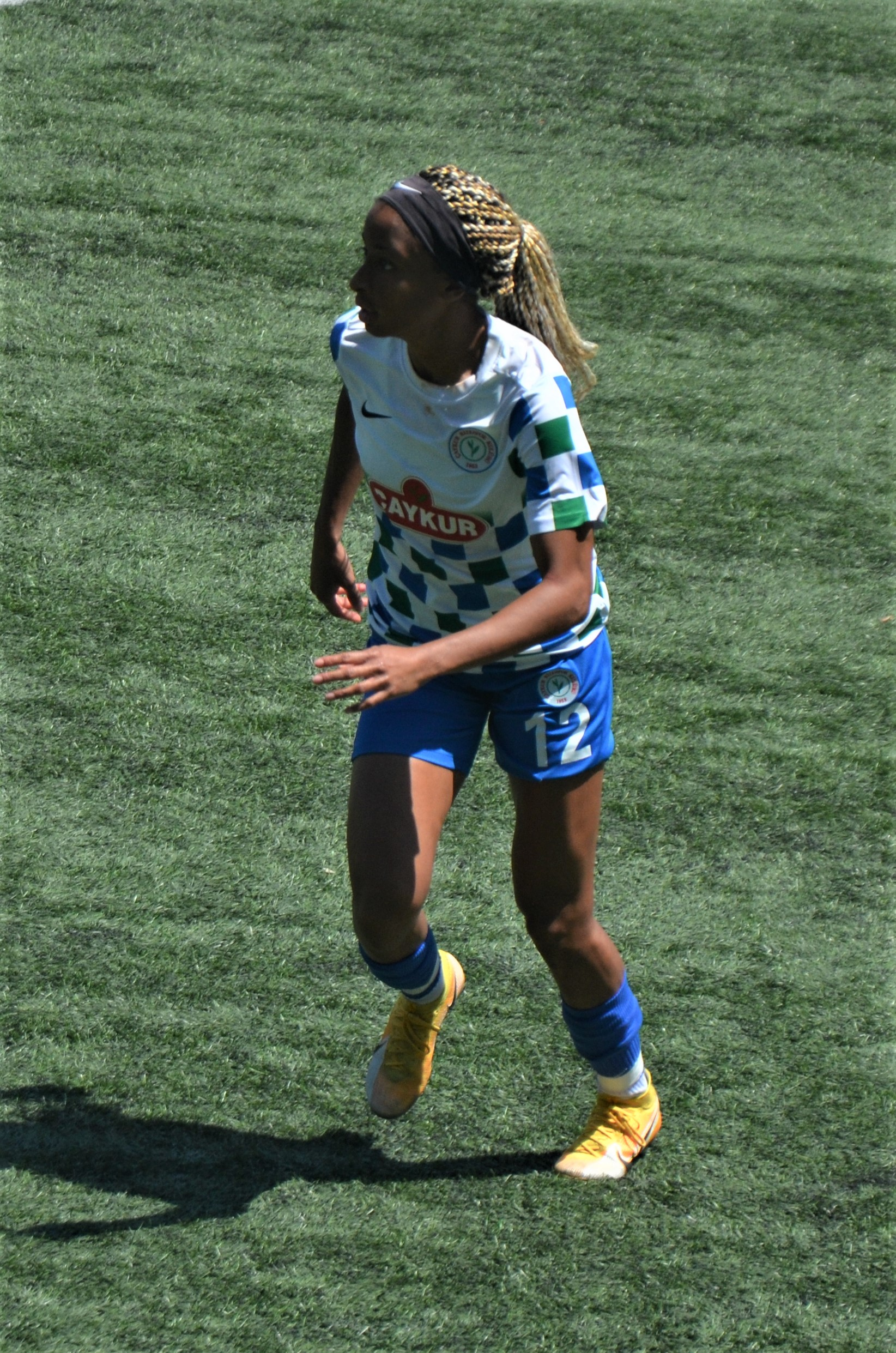
Aryana Harvey of Çaykur Rizespor in the 2021–22 Turkish Women's Football Super League.

In 2019, while attending Cal State Bakersfield, Harvey joined So Cal Union FC of the Women's Premier Soccer League in Temecula, California.

In July 2020, Harvey signed her first professional contract with Damaiense of Portugal's Campeonato Nacional Feminino.

In the beginning of 2022, she moved to Turkey, and joined the new established Çaykur Rizespor to play in the second half of the 2021–22 Turkish Women's Football Super League.

In the 2022–23 Super League season, Harvey transferred to the Istanbul-based club Fatih Vatan Spor.

After playing for Cesena FC in Italy, she went again to Turkey, and joined Giresun Sanayi, which was recently promoted to the Turkish Super League.
