= Mutlucan Zavotçu =

Turkish footballer and manager

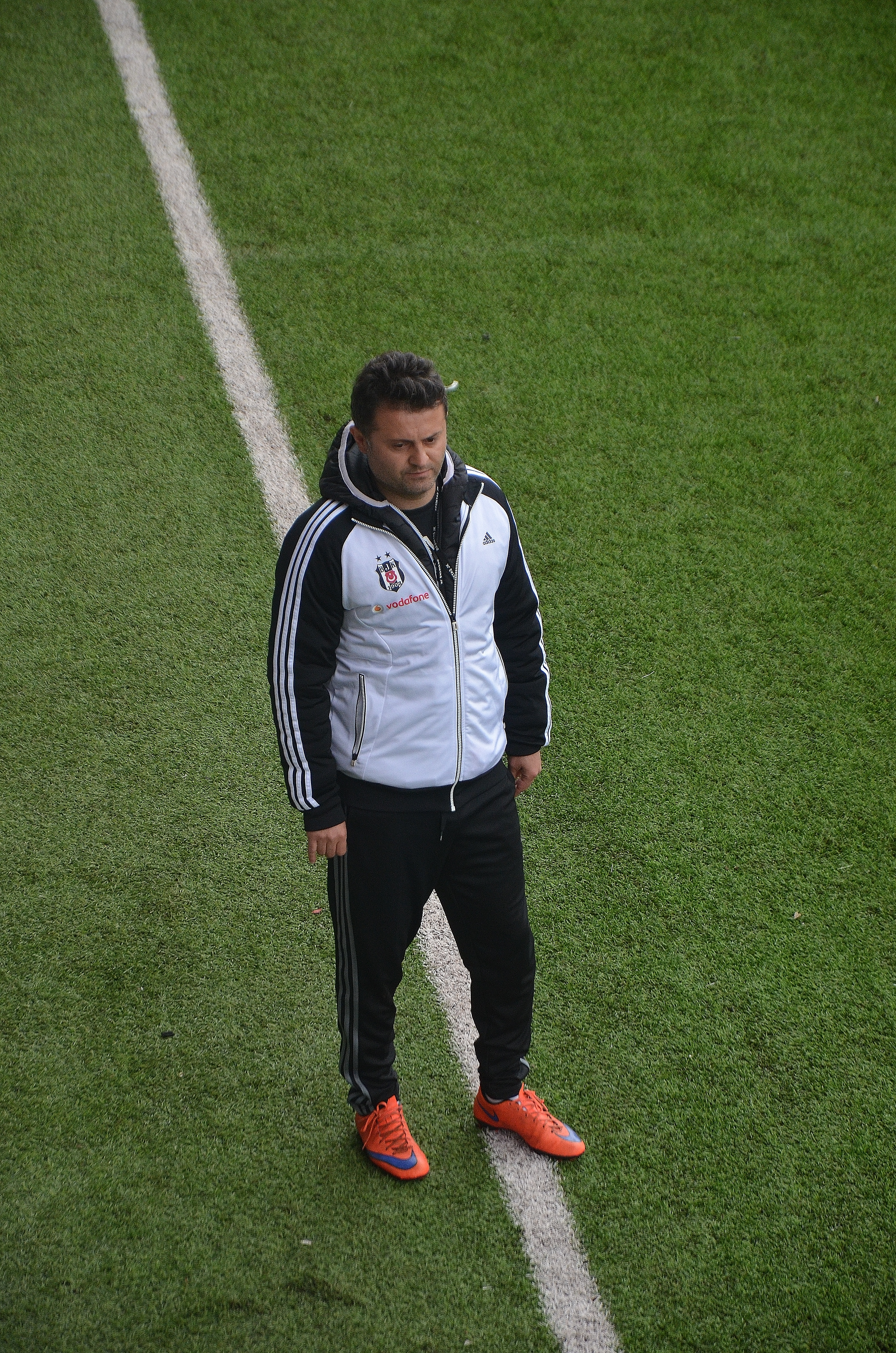
- Zavotçu during a 2016–17 season's play-off match

Personal information
- Date of birth: 8 February 1981 (age 45)
- Place of birth: Arpaçay, Kars Province, Turkey

Team information
- Current team: Çaykur Rizespor

Senior career*
Years	Team	Apps	(Gls)
1998–2000	Galatasaray		
2000–2001	Pazariçi Köprülü		
2001–2002	Küçükçekmecespor		
2002–2003	Zeytinburnuspor		
2004–2005	Alibeyköy		
2006–2007	Karsspor		
2007–2008	IFA		

Managerial career
- 2014–2020: Beşiktaş
- 2022: Çaykur Rizespor
- 2022: Beylerbeyi 1911 F.K.
- 2023: Beylerbeyi S.K: women
- 2023–: Fatih Vatan S.L.
- * Club domestic league appearances and goals

Mutlucan Zavotçu (born 8 February 1981) is a Turkish football manager and former player who coaches Çaykur Rizespor in the Women's Super League.

== Playing career ==
Zavotçu began his footballer career as an amateur at Galatasaray S.K. on 27 November 1998. After playing for the amateur clubs Pazariçi Köprülü and Küçükçekmecespor, he became professional and transferred to Zeytinburnuspor in August 2002. His next club was Alibeyköy. In August 2006, Zavotçu moved to his hometown to play for Karsspor. After one season, he returned to amateur status and signed with IFA, at which he then ended his playing career.

== Managerial career ==
Beşiktaş J.K. women's

On 31 October 2014 Zavotçu was appointed manager of the Beşiktaş J.K. women's football team, playing in the Turkish Women's Third Football League. He led the team to the Second League after winning the play-off matches at the end of the 2014–15 season. The next season, his team became champion of the Second League and was promoted to the Turkish Women's First Football League. He also led the team to win the regular 2016–17 Women's FirstLeague, failed however to become champion after the play-off round. His team became runner-up behind Konak Belediyespor, who won the title fifth time in a row. Beşiktaş J.K. finished the 2018–19 Turkish Women's First League season as leader with goal average equal on points with ALG Spor. He enjoyed his team's champion title for the first time in the First League after Beşiktaş J.K. defeated ALG Spor in the play-off match with 1–0.

By late September 2020, Zavotçu announced that he left Beşiktaş J.K. women's team, which he managed nine years.

Fenerbahçe S.K. women's

By July 2021, prior to the establishment of the women's side of Fenerbahçe S.K., the club decided firstly to transfer Mutlucan Zavotçu as manager taking in considerarton of his achievements by the founding and development of Beşiktaş J.K.

Lüleburgaz S.K.

Beginning of September 2021, Regional Amateur League (Turkish: Bölgesel Amatör Lig, BAL) club Lüleburgazspor announced that they signed with Zavotçu for the upcoming 2021–22 BAL Region 8 Group 1 season.

Çaykur Rizespor women's

Zavotçu was appointed manager of the newly established Çaykur Rizespor replacing İlknur Aktaş in third round of the 2021–22 Women's Super League season.

Beylerbeyi 1911 F.K.

In the 2022 season, he was with the BAL-club Beylebeyi 1911 F.K.

Beylerbeyi S.K. women's

After promotion of Beylerbeyi S.K. women's to the 2022–23 Women's Super League, he took over the team's management on 24 August 2023.

Fatih Vatan S.K.

Shortly before the and of the first half of the 2023–24 Women's Super League season, he transferred to Fatih Vatan S.K.. on 15 December.

=== Statistic s ===
As of 223 December 2023.

Team	Time	Record				
Team	Time	G	W	D	L	Win %
Beşiktaş J.K.
Beşiktaş J.K.	2014–2015	18	14	2	2	77.78
Beşiktaş J.K.	2015–2016	22	19	3	0	86.36
Beşiktaş J.K.	2016–2017	26	19	1	6	73.08
Beşiktaş J.K.	2017–2018	19	14	3	2	73.68
Beşiktaş J.K.	2018–2019	19	14	3	2	73.68
Beşiktaş J.K.	2019–2020	15	14	0	1	93.33
Beşiktaş J.K.	Total	119	94	12	13	78.99
Çaykur Rizespor
Çaykur Rizespor	2022	19	7	4	8	36.84
Çaykur Rizespor	Total	19	7	4	8	36.84
Beylerbeyi 1911 F.K.
Beylerbeyi 1911 F.K.	2022	4	1	1	2	25.00
Beylerbeyi 1911 F.K.	Total	4	1	1	2	25.00
Beylerbeyi women's
Beylerbeyi women's	2023	10	6	2	2	60.00
Beylerbeyi women's	Total	10	6	2	2	60.00
Fatih Vatan S.K.
Fatih Vatan S.K.	2023–2024	2	0	0	2	0.00
Fatih Vatan S.K.	Total	2	0	0	2	0.00
Grand total		154	108	19	27	70.13

== Honours ==
Turkish Women's First League

Beşiktaş J.K.
Winners (1): 2018–19
Runners-up (3): 2016–17, 2017–18, 2019–20

Turkish Women's Second League

Beşiktaş J.K.
Winners (1): 2015–16

Turkish Women's Third League

Beşiktaş J.K.
Winners (1): 2014–15
