= Çaykur Rizespor (women's football) =

Turkish women's football team

- Full name: Çaykur Rizespor women’s football
- Founded: 2021; 5 years ago
- Dissolved: 2022
- Ground: Mehmet Cengiz Facility Field #3
- Manager: (Turkey) Mutlucan Zavotçu
- League: Turkish Women's Super League
Home colours	Away colours	Third colours

Çaykur Rizespor women's football, (Turkish: Çaykur Rize Kadın Futbol Takımı), is a Turkish women's football team as part of Çaykur Rizespor based in Rize. Founded in 2021, the team play currently in the Turkish Women's Football Super League, the top tier of the women's football in Turkey.

== History ==
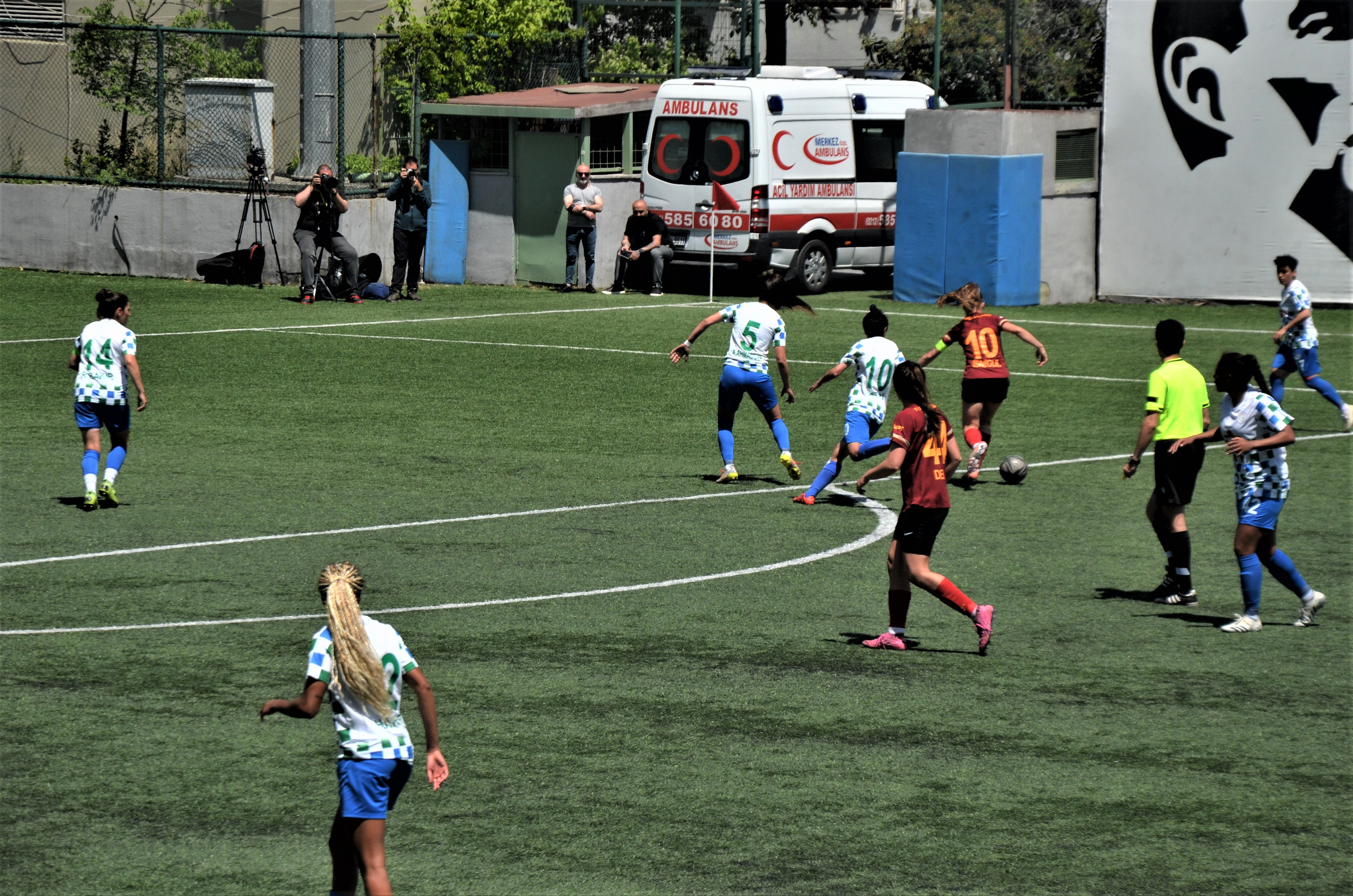
Galatasaray S.K. (red/yellow) vs Çaykur Rizespor (white/blue) in the 2021-22 Turkish Women's Football Super League's away match.

The 1953-founded Rize-based Çaykur Rizespor formed the women's football team in September 2021 with the intention to take part in the Turkish Women's Super League following the recommendation of the Turkish Football Federation.

== Stadium ==
The green-blue colored team play their home matches at the Mehmet Cengiz Facility's F eld #3. The ground is artificial turf.

== Statistics ==
As of 9 March 2022

Season	League	Rank	Pld	W	D	L	GF	GA	GD	Pts
2021-22	Super League Gr. B	7 (^{1})	12	3	2	7	18	23	-5	11
Green marks a season followed by promotion, red a season followed by relegation.

- (^{1}) : Season in progress

== Current squad ==
As of 9 March 2022

- Head coach: (Turkey) Mutlucan Zavotçu

Note: Flags indicate national team as defined under FIFA eligibility rules; some limited exceptions apply. Players may hold more than one non-FIFA nationality.

No.	Pos.	Nation	Player
1	GK	TUR	Gülsüm Tunç
3		TUR	Damla Kurt
4		TUR	Merve Odabaşoğlu
5	DF	AZE	Ayshan Ahmadova
6		TUR	Büşra Taşkın
7	FW	AZE	Mislina Gözükara
8		TUR	Rabia Nur Yılmaz
9		TUN	Sarra Hkili
10		TUR	Şehriban Dülek
11		TUR	Suzan Sayaca
12	MF	USA	Aryana Harvey
13		TUR	Aylin Ersürmeli
14	MF	TUR	Remziye Bakır
15		TUR	Gülsüm Aygün
17		TUR	Nazlı Feride Aletirik
18	FW	GEO	Teona Bakradze
19		TUR	Gözde Yıldırım

No.	Pos.	Nation	Player
20	MF	GHA	Doris Asiamah
21		TUR	Büşra Becerikli
22		TUR	Sevim Zehra Şeker
23	GK	TUR	Nagihan Bulut
27		TUR	Demet Kılınç
29	MF	AZE	Vusala Seyfatdinova
30	GK	TUN	Mariem Ben Sassi
42	MF	USA	Jessika Cowart
53		TUR	Esra Karaoğlu
54		TUR	Beyza Kuşsan
55		TUR	Gül Kaplan
61	DF	TUR	Nagehan Akşan (C)
71		TUR	Zehra Acar
77	FW	TUR	Emine Gümüş
92		TUR	Ceyda Aytemizn
97	MF	AZE	Aysun Aliyeva

== Squads ==
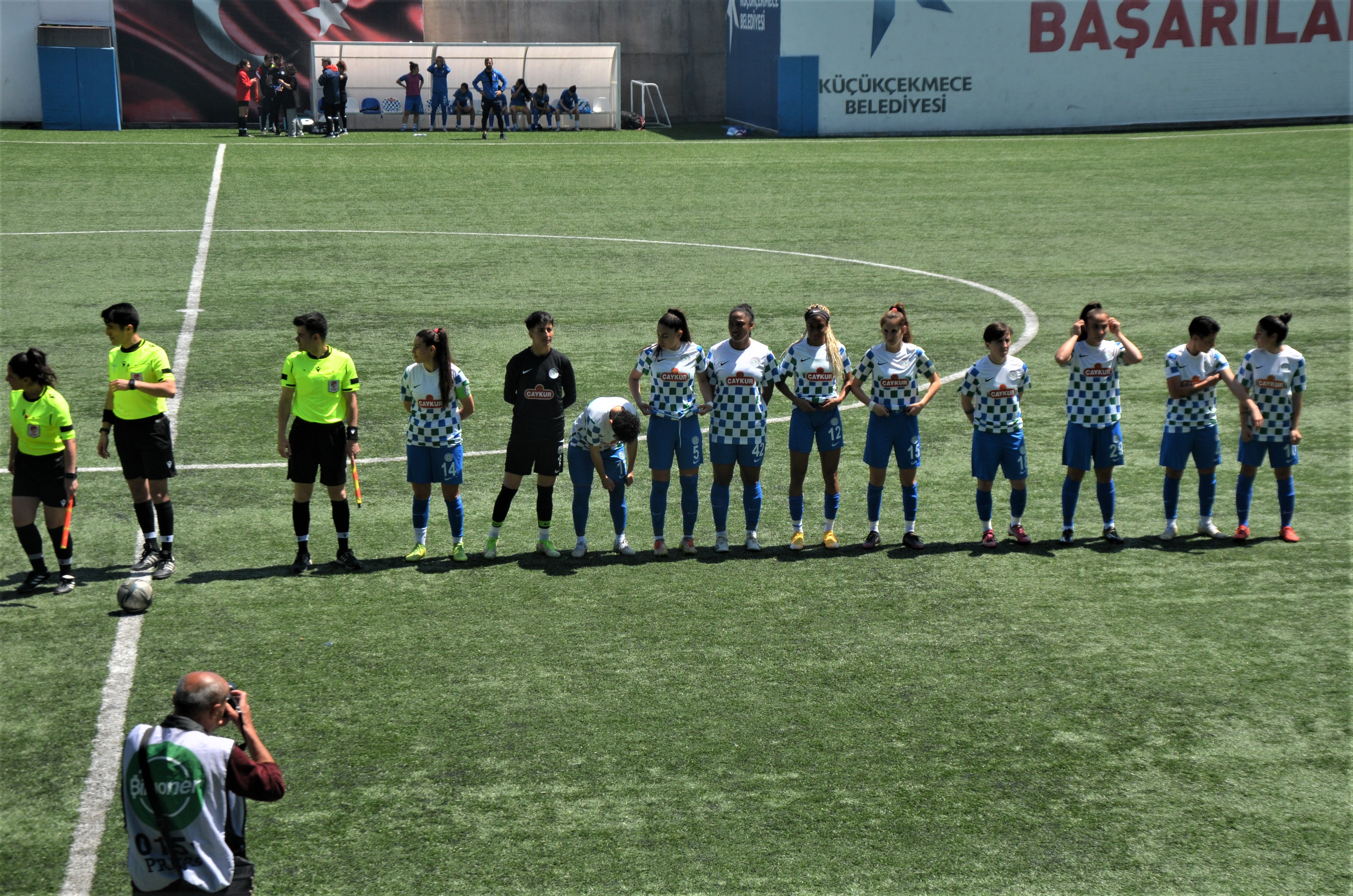
Çaykur Rizespor 2021-22 league season
