= Meriem Sassi =

Tunisian footballer (born 1991)

Mariem Ben Sassi
Personal information
- Date of birth: 1 April 1991 (age 35)
- Position: Goalkeeper

Team information
- Current team: Al-Nahda

Senior career*
Years	Team	Apps	(Gls)
- Tunisair Club
–2021	AS Banque de l'Habitat		
2021–2022	Çaykur Rizespor	4	(0)
2022–2023	Eastern Flames		
2023–	Al-Nahda		

International career
- Tunisia
- * Club domestic league appearances and goals as of 6 February 2022

Mariem Ben Sassi (Arabic: مريم ساسي; born 1 April 1991) is a Tunisian footballer, who last played as a goalkeeper for Saudi club Al-Nahda and the Tunisia women's national team.

== Club career ==
Ben Sassi has played for AS Banque de l'Habitat in Tunisia.

Ben Sassi moved to Turkey to and joined the newly founded team Çaykur Rizespor to play in the Turkish Women's Football Super League.

== International career ==
Ben Sassi has capped for Tunisia at senior level, including in a 2–0 friendly away win over Jordan on 13 June 2021.

== See also ==
- List of Tunisia women's international footballers
