= Aysun Aliyeva =

Azerbaijani footballer (born 1997)

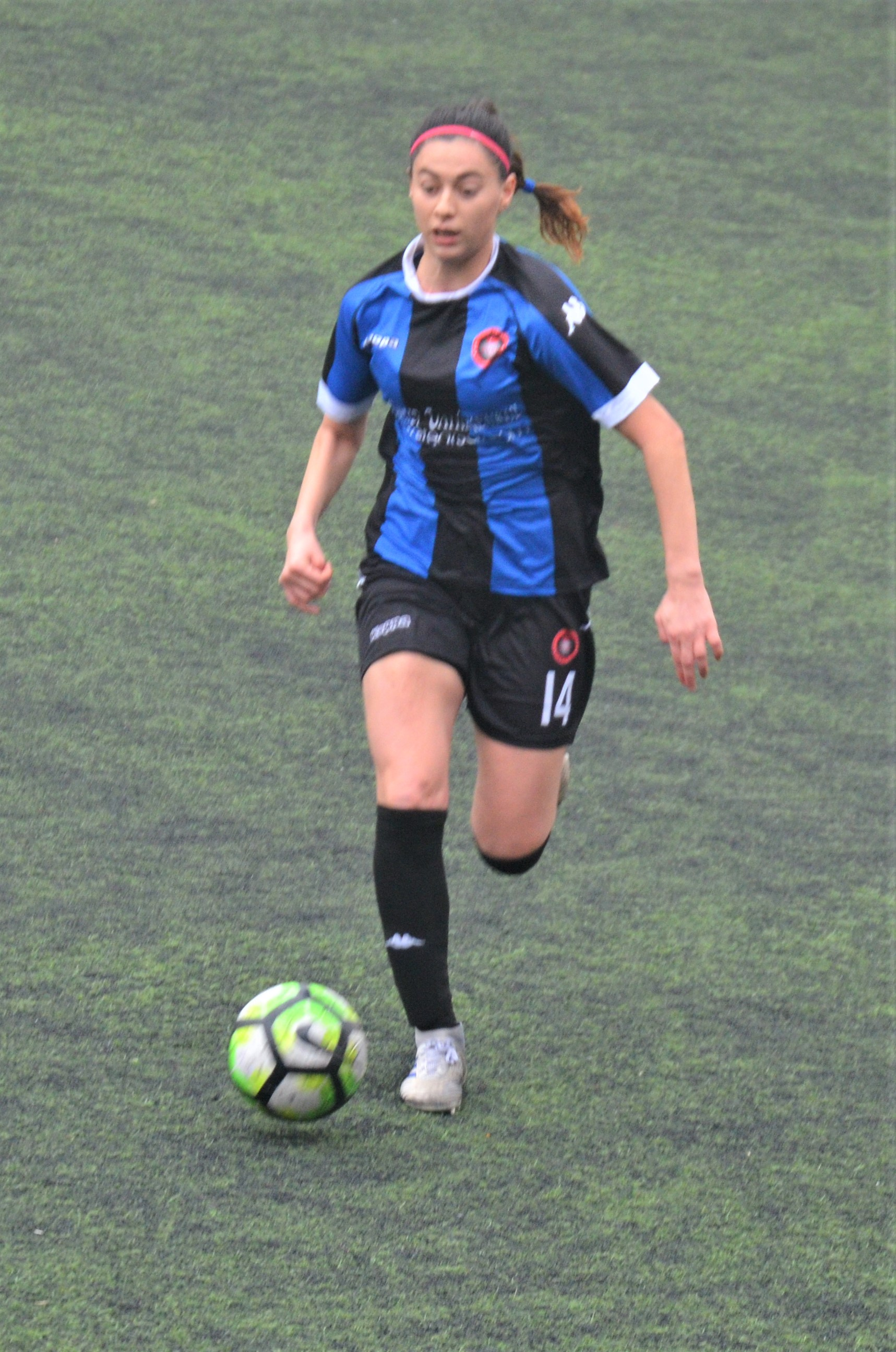
- Aysun Aliyeva of Fatih Vatan Spor in the 2019-20 Turkish Women's First Football League.

Personal information
- Date of birth: 19 July 1997 (age 29)
- Place of birth: Baku, Azerbaijan
- Height: 1.68 m (5 ft 6 in)
- Position: Midfielder

Team information
- Current team: Çaykur Rizespor
- Number: 97

Senior career*
Years	Team	Apps	(Gls)
2016	1207 Antalyaspor	8	(0)
2017	→İlkadım Belediyespor	12	(1)
2019	Okzhetpes		
2019–2020	Fatih Vatan Spor	11	(2)
2021	Fomget G.S.	6	(0)
2021	WFC Rubin Kazan	2	(0)
2021–2022	Çaykur Rizespor	16	(3)

International career^{‡}
2012	Azerbaijan U-17	6	(1)
2015–2016	Azerbaijan U-19	12	(2)
2017–	Azerbaijan	14	(1)
- * Club domestic league appearances and goals as of 17 April 2022 ‡ National team caps and goals as of 26 February 2022

Aysun Aliyeva (Azerbaijani: Aysun Əliyeva, born 19 July 1997) is an Azerbaijani footballer who plays as a midfielder for Turkis Super League club Çaykur Rizespor and the Azerbaijan women's national team. She was a member of the Azerbaijan U-17 and U-19 teams before she was admitted to the women's national U-21 team.

== Club career ==
Aliyeva played for the women's U-19 team of the Baku-based club Neftçi PFK in the Azerbaijan Women's U-19 League before she moved to Turkey in November 2016 to join the Turkish Women's First Football League team 1207 Antalyaspor.

The Samsun-based İlkadım Belediyesi took her on loan for the second half. of the 2016–17 season.

In 2019, she moved to Turkey again, and signed with the Istanbul-based club Fatih Vatan Spor on 1 November.

In the 2020-21 Turkish Women's League season, she played for the Ankara-based club Fomget Gençlik ve Spor.

Aliyeva transferred to the newly established team Çaykur Rizespor in the 2021-22 Turkish Women's Super League season.

== International career ==
Aliyeva played for Azerbaijan national U-19 team at six matches of the 2016 UEFA Women's Under-19 Championship qualification.

Aliyeva is a member of the Azerbaijan women's national under 21 football team. In 2017, she was admitted to the Azerbaijan women's national team. She played for the women's national team in all four matches of the UEFA Women's Euro 2021 qualifying Group D.

== International goals ==
No.	Date	Venue	Opponent	Score	Result	Competition
1.	23 February 2021	ASK Arena, Baku, Azerbaijan	Moldova	1–0	1–0	UEFA Women's Euro 2022 qualifying
2.	11 June 2021	GFF Training Center Basa, Tbilisi, Georgia	Georgia	1–2	2–3	Friendly

== Career statistics ==
As of match played 17 April 2022.

Club	Season	League			Continental		National		Total	
Club	Season	Division	Apps	Goals	Apps	Goals	Apps	Goals	Apps	Goals
1207 Antalya Spor	2016–17	Turkish First League	8	0	–	–			8	0
1207 Antalya Spor	Total		8	0	–	–			8	0
→İlkadım Belediyespor	2016-17	Turkish First League	12	1	–	–			12	1
→İlkadım Belediyespor	Total		12	1	–	–			12	1
Fatih Vatan Spor	2019-20	Turkish First League	11	2	–	–	4	0	15	2
Fatih Vatan Spor	Total		11	2	–	–	4	0	15	2
Fomget G.S.	2020-21	Turkish First League	6	0	–	–			6	0
Fomget G.S.	Total		6	0	–	–			6	0
Çaykur Rizespor	2021-22	Turkish Super League	16	3	–	–			16	3
Çaykur Rizespor	Total		16	3	–	–			16	3

== See also ==
- List of Azerbaijan women's international footballers
