= Tavla Gençlikspor =

- Full name: Defne Belediyesi Spor Kulübü 2019 Tavla Gençlikspor
- Founded: 2014
- Ground: Çekmece Atatürk Stadium
- Chairman: Mehmet Turunç
- League: Women's Second League

Tavla Gençlikspor (Turkish: Defne Belediyesi Spor Kulübü 2019 Tavla Gençlikspor) is a women's football club located in the Defne district of Hatay Province, southern Turkey. The team was promoted to the Turkish Women's Second Football League for the 2020–21 season.

== Statistics ==
Season	League	Pos	Pld	W	D	L	GF	GA	GD	Pts
2014–15	Women's Third League – Gr. 6	6	12	1	0	11	19	110	−91	3
2015–16	Women's Third League – Gr. 6	5	18	8	2	8	89	62	+27	26
2016–17	Women's Third League – Gr. 7	6	24	12	2	10	69	75	−6	35^{1})
2017–18	Women's Third League – Gr. 10	2	10	8	0	2	66	13	+53	24
2018–19	Women's Third League – Gr. 10	1	8	8	0	0	55	7	+48	24
2019–20	Women's Third League – Gr. 7	1	11	10	1	0	61	5	+56	31^{2})
2020–21	Women's Second League									
Green marks a season followed by promotion, red a season followed by relegation.

Notes:

- ^{1}) Three penalty points were deducted by the Turkish Football Federation
- ^{2}) Promoted to the Women's Second League by point average after the discontinued season due to the outbreak of the COVID-19 pandemic in Turkey
