= Asya S.K. =

Turkish association football club

Asya Spor
- Full name: Asya Spor Kulübü
- Founded: 2021; 4 years ago
- Ground: Aktoprak Football Field
- League: Turkish Women's Football Super League
- 2023–24: 13th

Asya Spor Kulübü, better known as Gaziantep Asya Spor, is a women's football club in Gaziantep, Turkey founded in 2021. They are also called Doğuş Gold Gaziantep Asya Spor after their sponsor Doğuş Gold Co.

== Stadium ==
The team play their home matches at Aktoprak Football Field in Şehitkamil district of Gaziantep.

== History ==
Asya S.K. was established as a women's football club in Şahinbey district of Gaziantep, Turkey in 2021. They started to play in the 2021–22 Turkish Women's Second Football League. They finished the Group A as leader, and won the play-off match. The club gained the sponsorship of the company Doğuş Gold in 2021. They were promoted to the Turkish Women's First Football League in the 2022–23 season. The team finished the season as runner-up, and was promoted to the Turkish Women's Football Super League in the 2023–24 season. Brazilian team member Giovânia Domingas Campos was one of season's two top scorers with 36 goals.

== Statistics ==
As of 16 September 2023.

Season	League	Pos.	Pld	W	D	L	GF	GA	GD	Pts
2021–22	Second League – Gr. A	1	10	9	0	1	52	7	+45	27
2022–23	First League	2	24	18	3	3	99	19	+80	57
2023–24	Super League	13 (^{1})	4	1	0	3	8	-5	+3	3

- (^{1}): Season in progress

== Current squad ==
As of 16 September 2023.

Note: Flags indicate national team as defined under FIFA eligibility rules; some limited exceptions apply. Players may hold more than one non-FIFA nationality.

No.	Pos.	Nation	Player
12	GK	COL	Maritza Guerrero
23	GK	TUR	Gülten Kara
13	DF	AZE	Alina Nahmadova
22	DF	AZE	Kamilla Mammadova
99	DF	TUR	Sibel Duman
8	MF	TUR	Azra Ardos
10	MF	TUR	Elif Kesgin
25	MF	TUR	Hacer Şengül
42	MF	CMR	Viviane Mefire Peka

No.	Pos.	Nation	Player
90	MF	COD	Bénie Kubiena
6	FW	COL	Iranis Rodríguez
27	FW	BRA	Giovânia Campos
31	FW	USA	Tatiana Mason
4		TUR	Tuana Şahin
7		TUR	Kardelen Patoğlu
9		NGA	Blessing Nikor
11		TUR	Arife Kübra Gözmener

== See also ==
Other women's football clubs in Gaziantep are:

- ALG Spor, play in the Super League,
- Gazikentspor, played earlier in the top-level league, and is now in the Second League.
