= Kdz. Ereğli Belediye Spor =

- Full name: Karadeniz Ereğli Belediye Spor Kulübü
- Ground: Beyçayırı Stadium
- Capacity: 1,300
- Coordinates: 41°17′00″N 31°25′25″E
- League: Turkish Women's Super League
- 2024-25: 14th

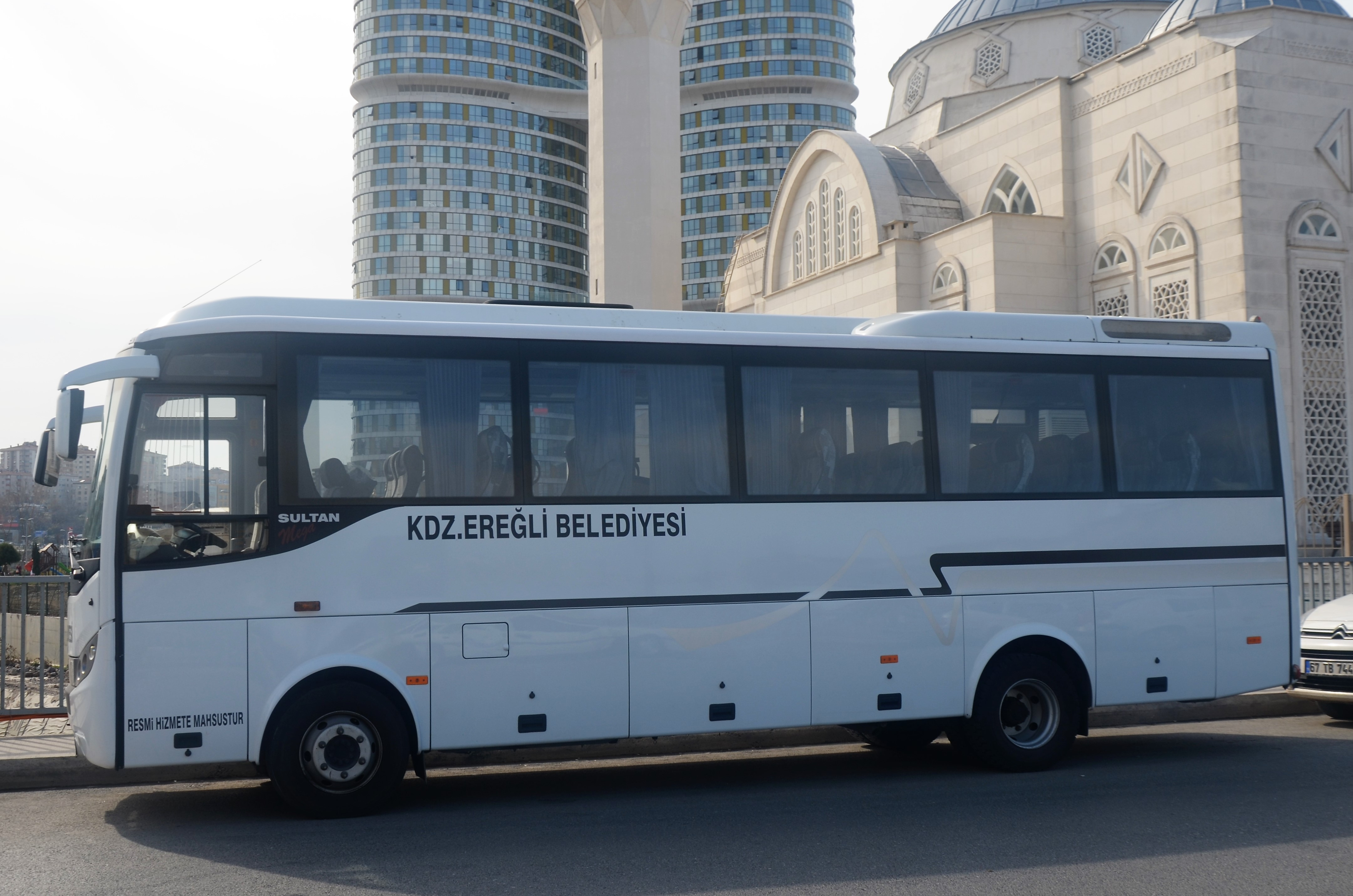
Team bus of Kdz. Ereğli Belediye Spor.

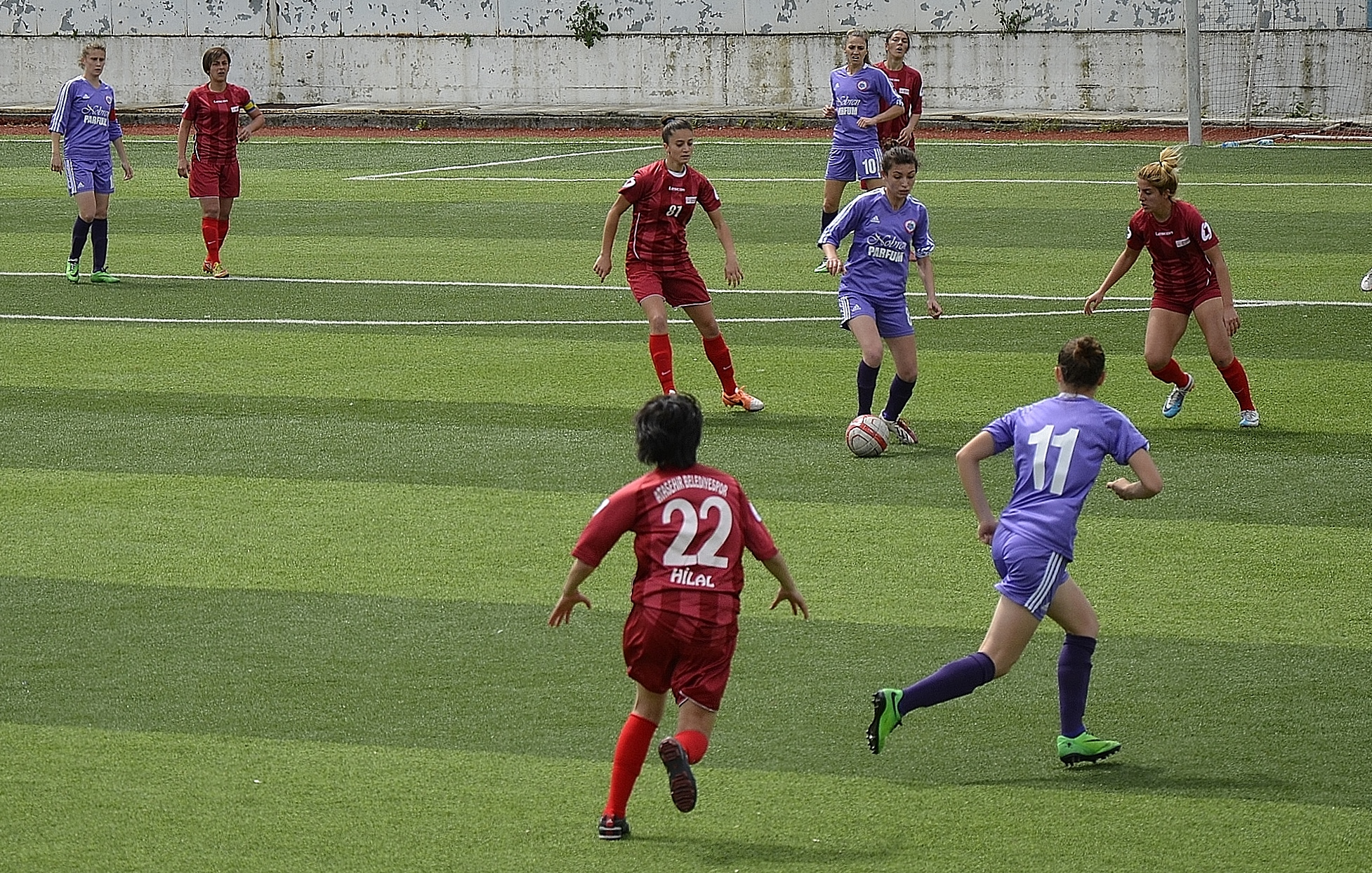
Kdz. Ereğli Belediye Spor at an away match against Ataşehir Belediyespor in the 2013–14 season

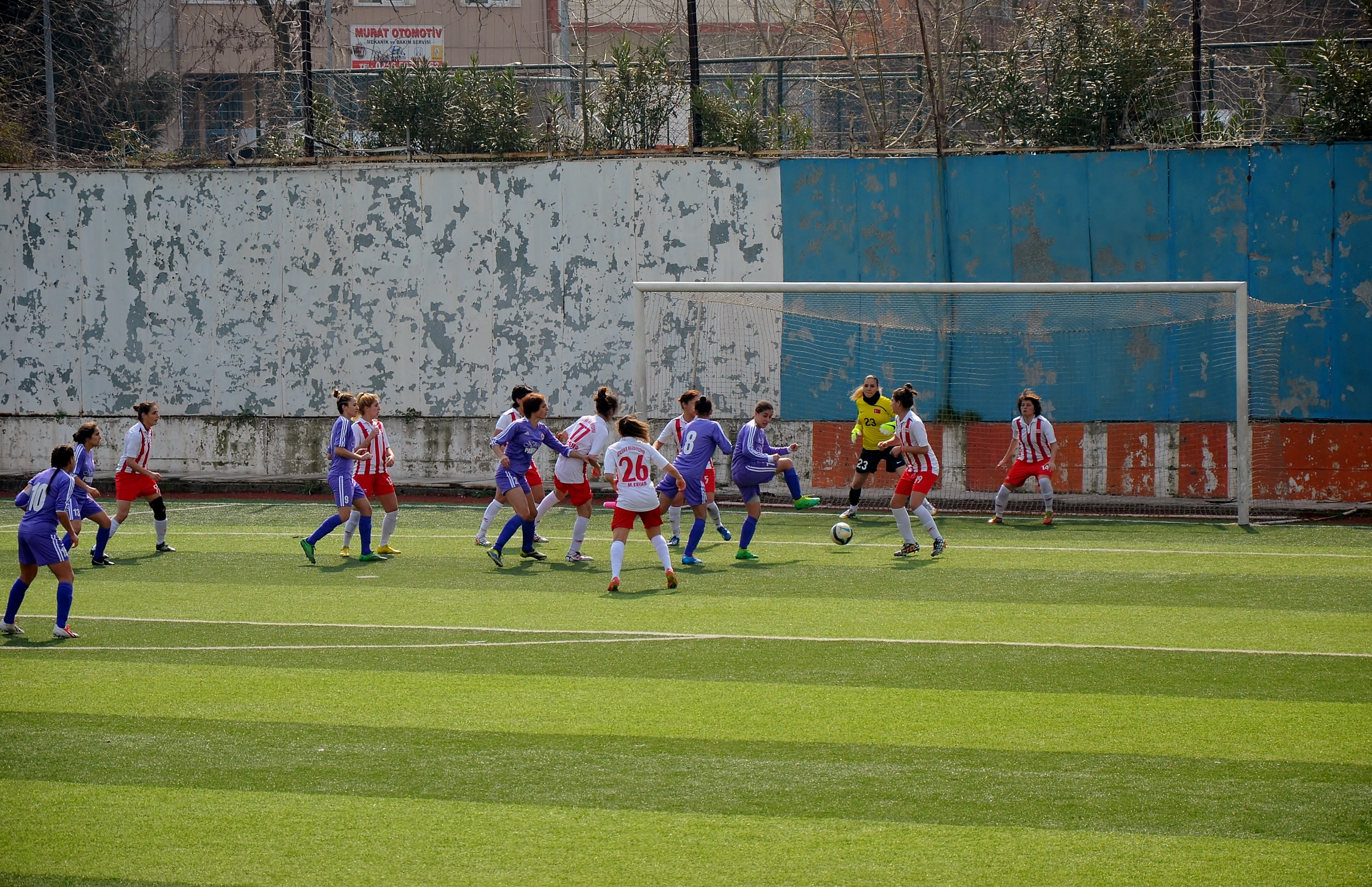
Kdz. Ereğli Belediye Spor attacking Ataşehir Belediyespor in the away match during the 2013–14 season

Kdz. Ereğli Belediye Spor is a women's football team based in the Karadeniz Ereğli district of Zonguldak Province in Turkey. They are associated with Karadeniz Ereğli Belediye Spor Kulübü, a men's side, and play in the Turkish Women's First Football League.

== History ==
At the end of the 2010–11 season, the team were promoted to the Women's First League after defeating Mersin Camspor in the play-off final match.

The team finished their first season in the Women's First League in the third place. The next season in 2012–13, Kdz. Ereğlispor women repeated their ranking. The 2013–14 season ended for them in the fourth place behind Derince Belediyespor. They finished the 2014–15 season at 5th place. The team's rank for the 2015–16 season was the 6th place.

The team has been playing in the Turkish Women's Football Super League since the 2021–22 season. The club had paid the league participation fee to the Turkish Football Federation (TFF) before the beginning of the 2024–25 league season as usual, but withdrew from the league without playing any match because there was no longer any possibility of sustainability due to lack of sponsorship support. The team placed so last, and was relegated to the Turkish Women's Football First League for the next season.

== Stadium ==
Kdz. Ereğlispor play their home matches at Beyçayırı Stadium in Karadeniz Ereğli, Zonguldak. The venue, which was renovated in September 2011, has a capacity for 1,300 spectators.

== Statistics ==
As of 22 December 2024.

| Season | League | Rank | Pld | W | D | L | GF | GA | GD | Pts |
|---|---|---|---|---|---|---|---|---|---|---|
| 2006–07 | Women's League Div. A | 11 | 10 | 2 | 3 | 5 | 15 | 28 | −13 | 9 |
| 2007–08 | Second League Div. B | 4 | 8 | 3 | 0 | 5 | 18 | 25 | −7 | 9 |
| 2008–09 | Second League Div. 2 | 2 | 8 | 3 | 3 | 2 | 11 | 8 | +3 | 12 |
| 2009–10 | Second League | 4 | 18 | 9 | 1 | 8 | 57 | 34 | +23 | 28 |
| 2010–11 | Second League | 3 | 18 | 10 | 5 | 3 | 45 | 24 | +21 | 35 |
| 2011–12 | First League | 2 | 22 | 13 | 3 | 6 | 54 | 35 | +19 | 42 |
| 2012–13 | First League | 3 | 18 | 12 | 1 | 5 | 39 | 27 | +12 | 37 |
| 2013–14 | First League | 4 | 20 | 8 | 2 | 10 | 33 | 32 | +1 | 26 |
| 2014–15 | First League | 5 | 18 | 9 | 0 | 9 | 32 | 37 | −5 | 27 |
| 2015–16 | First League | 6 | 18 | 7 | 0 | 11 | 54 | 45 | +9 | 21 |
| 2016–17 | First League | 7 | 26 | 10 | 4 | 12 | 51 | 50 | +1 | 34 |
| 2017–18 | First League | 4 | 18 | 10 | 1 | 7 | 26 | 22 | +4 | 31 |
| 2018–19 | First League | 5 | 18 | 8 | 4 | 6 | 23 | 9 | +4 | 28 |
| 2019–20 | First League | 7 (^{1}) | 16 | 4 | 3 | 9 | 16 | 28 | -12 | 15 |
| 2020–21 | First League Gr. D | 9 | 3 | 1 | 0 | 2 | 2 | 3 | -1 | 3 |
| 2021–22 | Super League Gr. A | 6 (^{2}) | 22 | 12 | 2 | 8 | 50 | 34 | +16 | 38 |
| 2022-23 | Super League Gr. A | 5 | 16 | 7 | 3 | 6 | 20 | 18 | +2 | 24 |
| 2022-23 | Playoffs | 1st Rd | 2 | 0 | 1 | 1 | 1 | 2 | -1 | 1 |
| 2023-24 | Super League | 9 | 30 | 11 | 6 | 13 | 40 | 40 | 0 | 39 |
| 2024-25 | Super League | 14 | 26 | 0 | 0 | 26 | 0 | 78 | -78 | -3 |
Green marks a season followed by promotion, red a season followed by relegation.

- (^{1}): Season in discontinued due to COVID-19 pandemic in Turkey
- (^{2}): Standing in Group A
- (^{3}): Season in progress

== Current squad ==
As of 22 December 2024.

Head coach:

No squad was formed.

== Former managers ==
- (Turkey) Yıldıray Ağar (2009–2012)
- (Turkey) Ömer Faruk Varlık (2012–2014)
- (Turkey) Necat Bakan (2014–2017)
- (Turkey) Selçuk Akbaş (2017)
- (Turkey) Necat Bakan (2017)
- (Turkey) Günal Taşdemir (2018)
- (Turkey) Yıldıray Ağar (2019)
- (Turkey) Ömer Faruk Varlık (2019–2022)

== Honours ==
Turkish Women's Second League
Runners-up: (1):2008–09
Third places: (1): 2010–11

Turkish Women's First League
Third places: (2): 2011–12, 2012–13

== Kit history ==
| 2014-15 home | 2015-16 away | 2017-18 away | 2018-19 home | 2018-19 away | 2019-20 away |
2023-24 away

== Squads ==
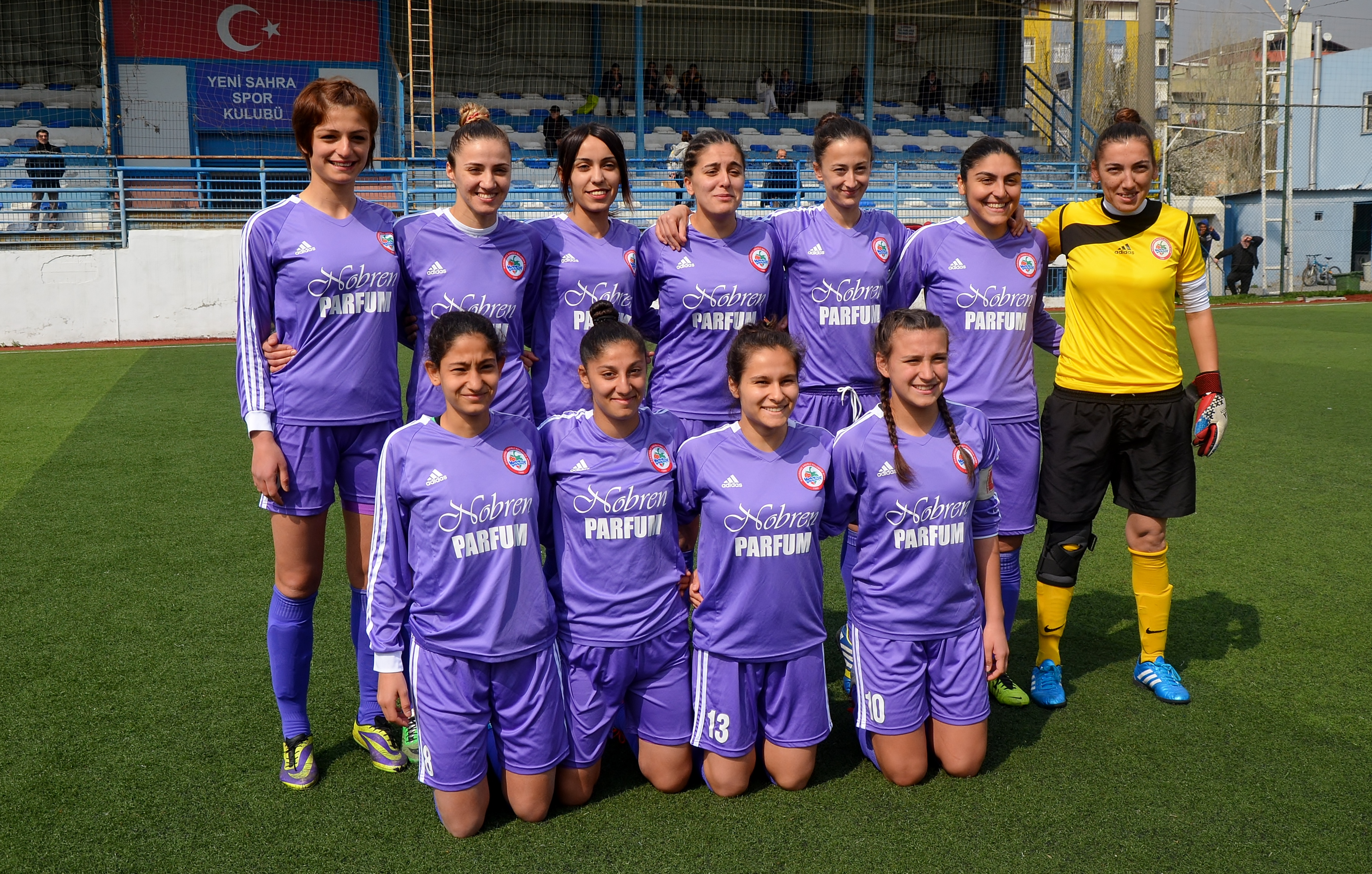
Kdz. Ereğli Belediye Spor squad in the 2014–15 Women's First League

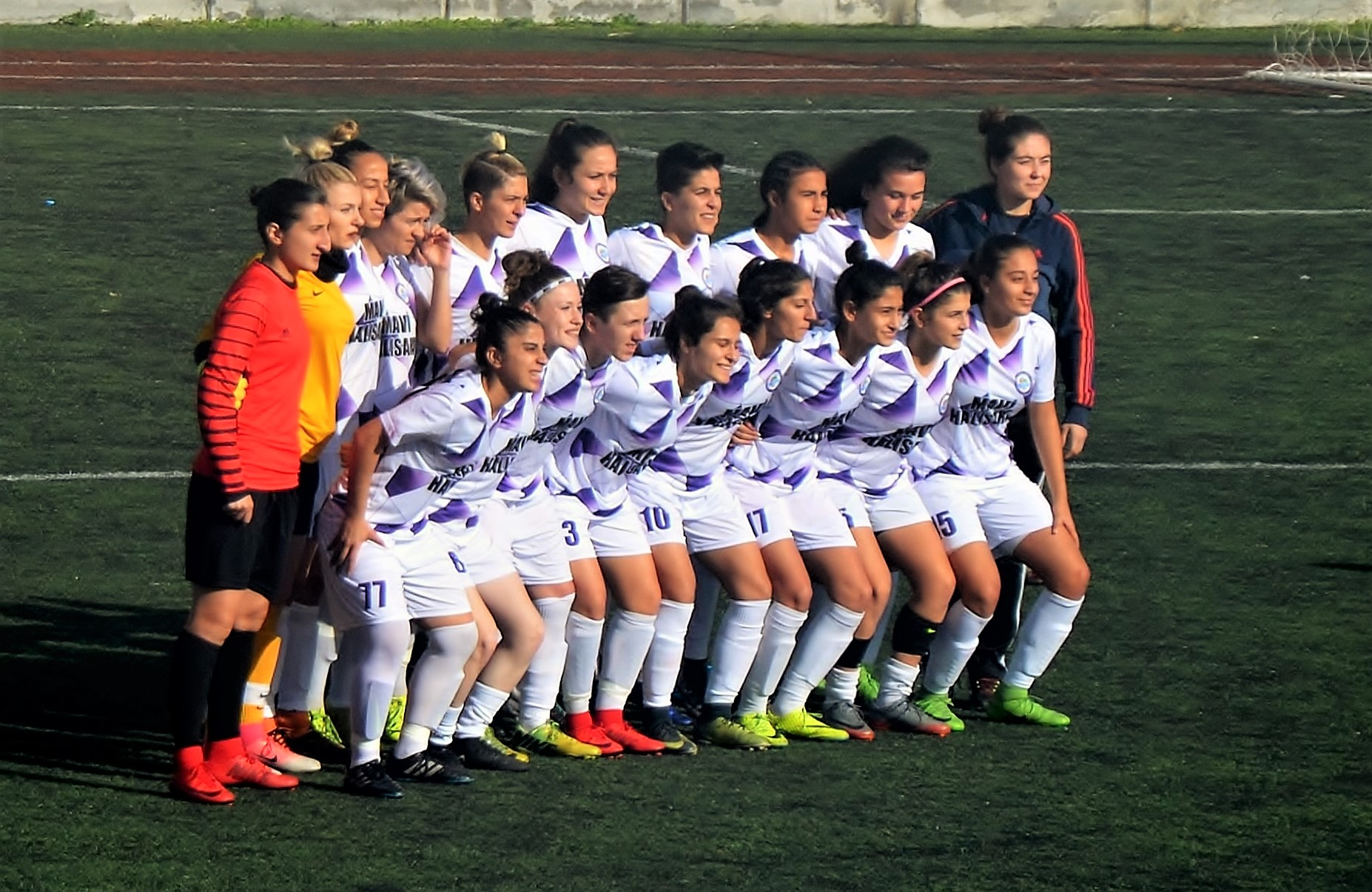
Kdz. Ereğli Belediye Spor squad in the 2017–18 Women's First League

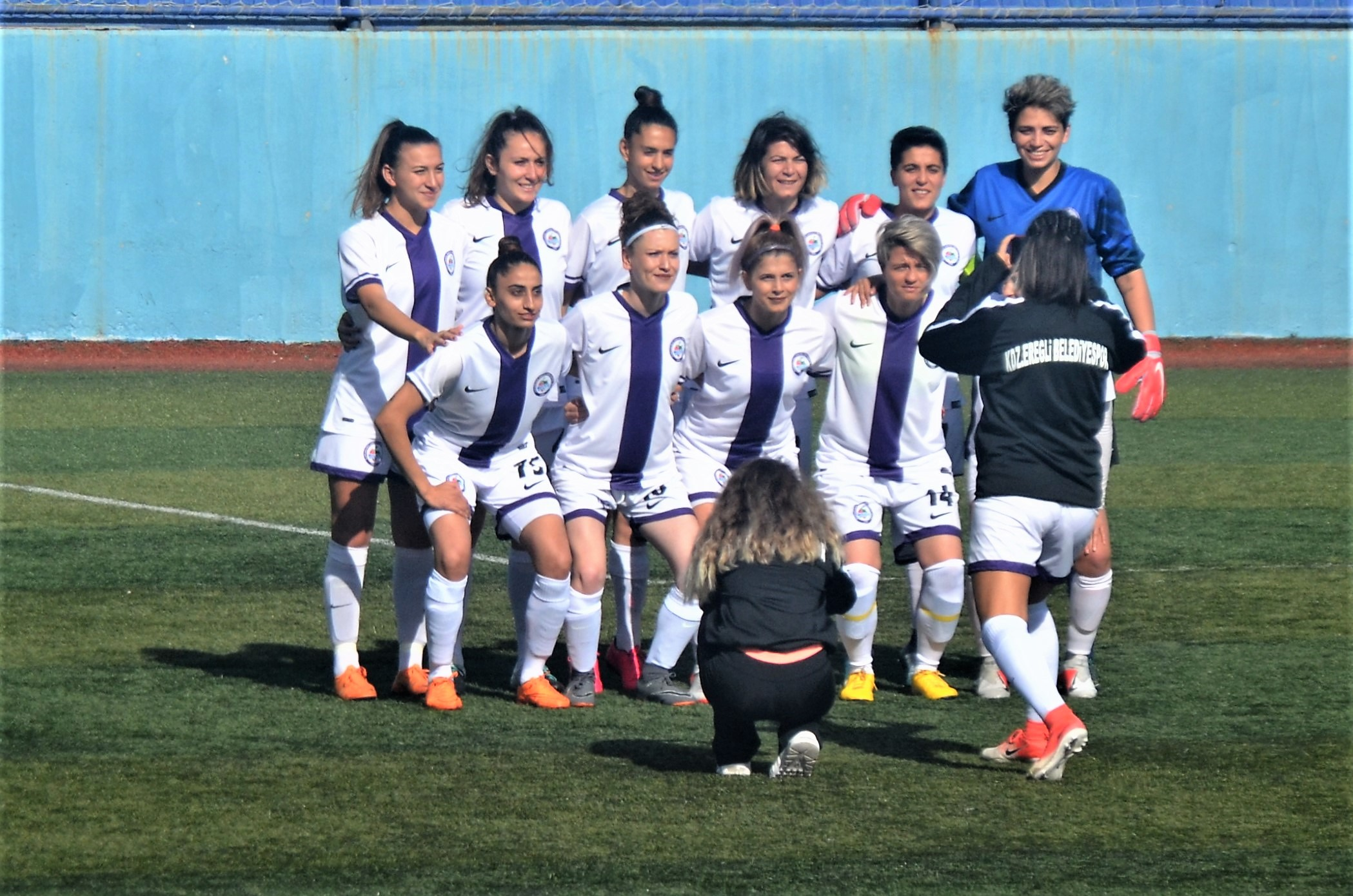
Kdz. Ereğli Belediye Spor squad in the 2018–19 Women's First League

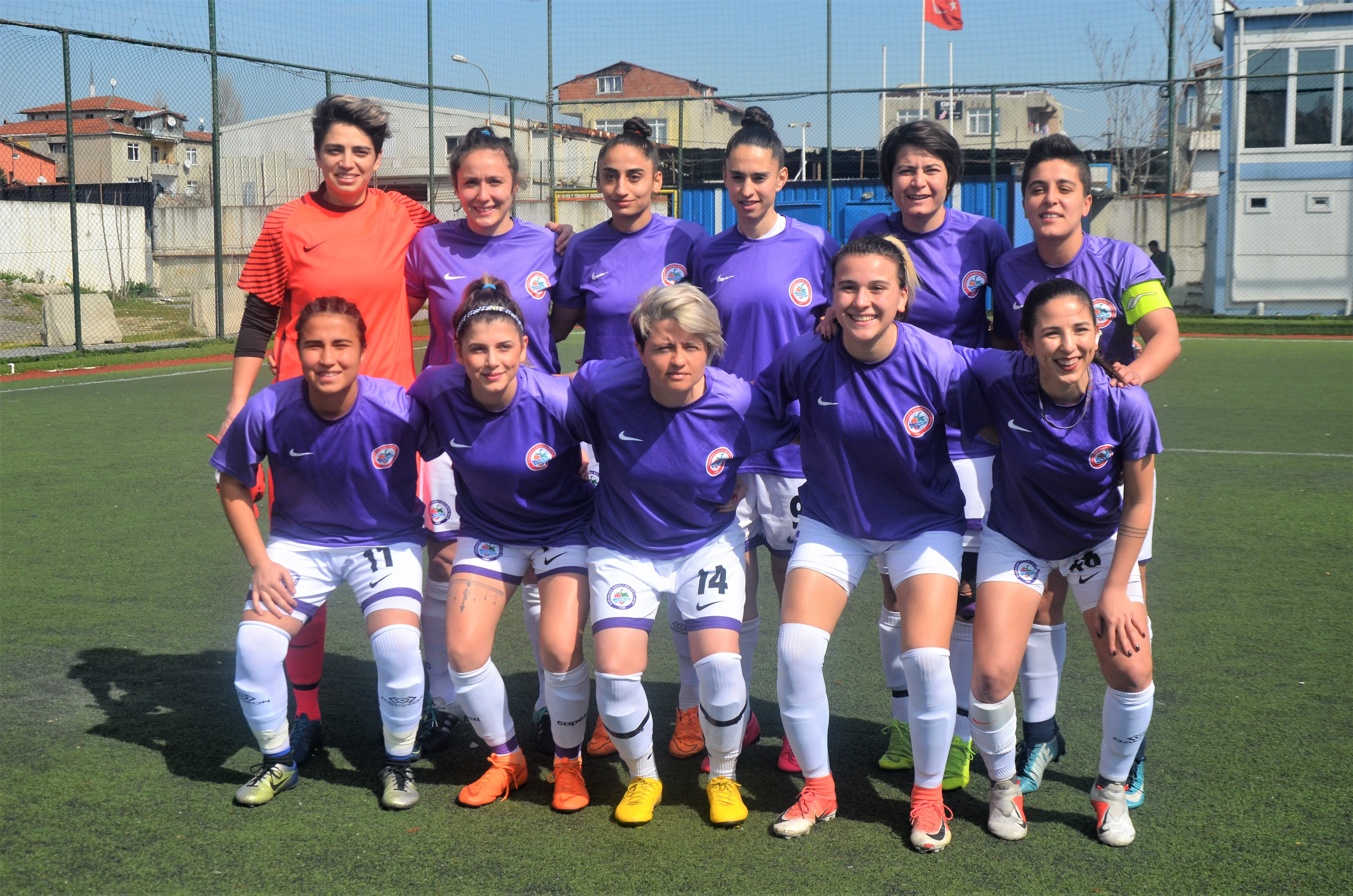
Kdz. Ereğli Belediye Spor squad in the 2018-19 Turkish Women's First Football League
