= Duygu Yılmaz =

Association football player (born 1988)

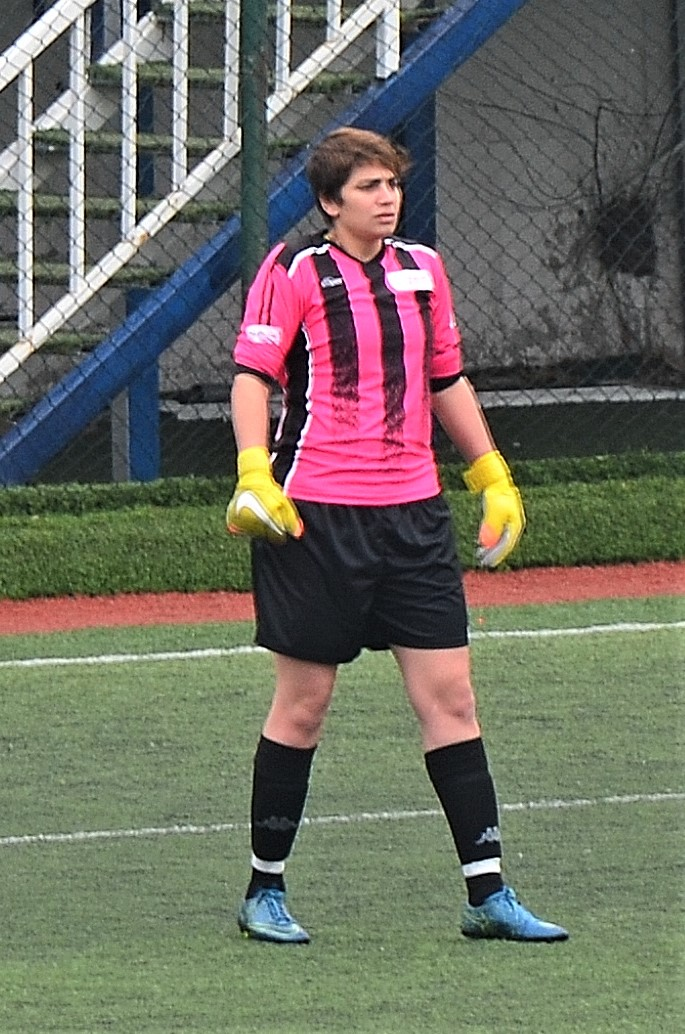
- Duygu Yılmaz playing for Ataşehir Belediyespor (March 2016)

Personal information
- Date of birth: 3 May 1988 (age 38)
- Place of birth: Keçiören, Ankara Province, Turkey
- Height: 1.75 m (5 ft 9 in)
- Position: Goalkeeper

Team information
- Current team: Sultanbeyli Gücü
- Number: 1

Senior career*
Years	Team	Apps	(Gls)
2008–2010	Gazi Üniversitesispor	26	(1)
2010–2018	Ataşehir	62	(0)
2018–2020	Kdz. Ereğli	29	(0)
2021	Beşiktaş	0	(0)
2021–2023	Fatih Karagümrük	35	(0)
2024	Beylerbeyi	12	(0)
2025	Gölbaşı Bld.	7	
2025–2026	Fatih Vatan	12	(0)
2026–	Sultanbeyli Gücü	3	(0)

International career^{‡}
2006	Turkey U-17	1	(0)
2006–2007	Turkey U-19	14	(0)
2006–2011	Turkey	21	(0)
- * Club domestic league appearances and goals as of 1 November 2026 ‡ National team caps and goals as of 28 June 2022

Duygu Yılmaz (born 3 May 1988) is a Turkish women's football goalkeeper who plays in the Turkish Women's Super League for Sultanbeyli Gücü with jersey number 1. She was a member of the U-17, U-19 and Turkey women's national team.

== Early years ==
Duygu Yılmaz was born to a footballer father in Keçiören district of Ankara Province, Turkey on 3 May 1988. Her older sister played also football.

== Club career ==
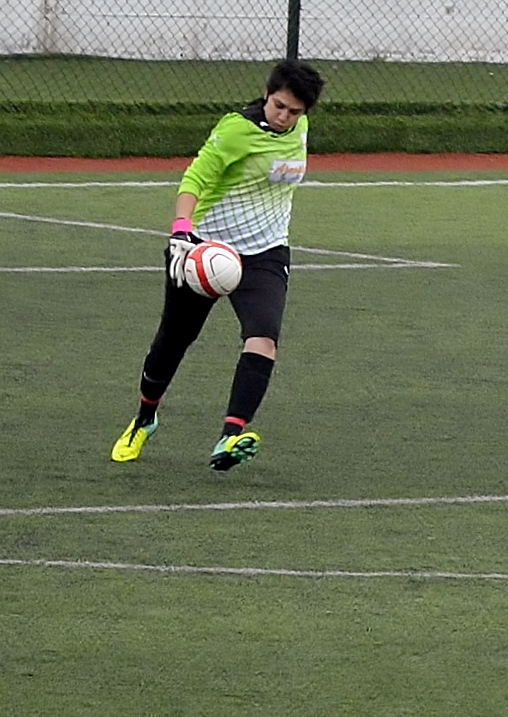
Duygu Yılmaz playing for Ataşehir Belediyespor in a home match of the 2013–14 season.

Yılmaz obtained her license for Gazi Üniversitesispor in her hometown on March 4, 2003. She began her career in the forward position. However, she accepted her trainers suggestion to play the goalkeeper from then on due to her good reflex she exposed during a training as she was keping the goal. After playing two full seasons between 2008 and 2010, she transferred to the Istanbul-based Ataşehir Belediyespor. she enjoyed league champion title at the end of the 2009–10 season with Gazi Üniversitesispor.

She took part for Ataşehir Belediyespor at all three matches of the 2011–12 UEFA Women's Champions League.

In October 2018, she transferred to Kdz. Ereğlispor.

In the 2020-21 Turkish Women's Football League season, she joined Beşiktaş and enjoyed the champion title with her team. By October 2021, she transferred to the newly established Fatih Karagümrğk Women's.

In the 2024–25 Super League season, she transferred to Beylerbeyi.

== International career ==
Yılmaz was admitted to the Turkey girls' U-17 team, and debuted in the friendly match against Belgium on January 31, 2008.

She was a member of the Turkey women's U-19 team, and took part at three matches of the 2007 UEFA Championship First qualifying round. She capped in total 14 times for the national U-19 team.

She played her first match with the Turkey women's national team on November 18, 2006, and participated in three matches of the UEFA Women's Euro 2009 qualifying, four of the 2008 UEFA Support International Tournament, tw of the 2009 UEFA Support International Tournament, seven of the 2011 FIFA Women's World Cup qualification – UEFA Group 5 matches, and one of the UEFA Women's Euro 2013 qualifying – Group 2 match. She capped in 20 matches between 2006 and 2011.

== Career statistics ==
As of match played 1 November 2026.

Club	Season	League			Continental		National		Total	
Club	Season	Division	Apps	Goals	Apps	Goals	Apps	Goals	Apps	Goals
Gazi Üniversitesispor	2004–08	First League	0	0	–	–	20	0	20	0
Gazi Üniversitesispor	2008–09	First League	14	1	–	–	4	0	18	1
Gazi Üniversitesispor	2009–10	First League	12	0	–	–	5	0	17	0
Gazi Üniversitesispor	Total		26	1	–	–	29	0	55	1
Ataşehir	2010–11	First League	16	0	–	–	3	0	19	0
Ataşehir	2011–12	First League	15	0	3	0	3	0	21	0
Ataşehir	2013–14	First League	1	0	0	0	0	0	1	0
Ataşehir	2015–16	First League	16	0	0	0	0	0	16	0
Ataşehir	2016–17	First League	7	0	0	0	0	0	7	0
Ataşehir	2017–18	First League	7	0	0	0	0	0	7	0
Ataşehir	Total		62	0	3	0	6	0	71	0
Kdz. Ereğl	2018–19	First League	15	0	–	–	0	0	15	0
Kdz. Ereğl	2019–20	First League	14	0	–	–	0	0	14	0
Kdz. Ereğl	Total		29	0	–	–	0	0	29	0
Beşiktaş	2020–21	First League	0	0	–	–	0	0	0	
Fatih Karagümrük	2021–22	Super League	24	0	–	–	1	0	25	0
Fatih Karagümrük	2022–23	Super League	11	0	–	–	0	0	11	0
Fatih Karagümrük	Total		35	0	–	–	1	0	36	
Beylerbeyi	2024–25	Super League	12	0	–	–	0	0	12	0
Gölbaşı Bld.	2024–25	First League	7	0	–	–	0	0	7	0
Fatih Vatan	2025–26	Super League	12	0	–	–	0	0	12	0
Sultanbeyli Gücü	2026–27	Super League	3	0	–	–	0	0	3	0
Career total			186	1	3	0	36	0	225	1

== Honours ==
Turkish Women's First Football League

Gazi Üniversitesispor
Winners (1): 2009–10

Ataşehir
Winners (2): 2010–11, 2011–12, 2011–12
Runners-up (4): 2012–13, 2013–14, 2014–15, 2015–16
Third places (41): 2016–17

Beşiktaş
Winners (1): 2020–21

Fatih Karagümrük
Runners-up: 2021–22
