= Zübeyde Kaya =

Turkish footballer (born 1991)

Personal information
- Date of birth: July 5, 1991 (age 35)
- Place of birth: Sungurlu, Çorum, Turkey
- Position: Defender

Team information
- Current team: Kdz. Ereğlispor

Senior career*
Years	Team	Apps	(Gls)
2008–2012	Gazi Üniversitesispor	59	(4)
2012–2014	Kdz. Ereğlispor	33	(1)
Total		92	(5)

International career^{‡}
2007	Turkey U-17	7	(1)
2007–2010	Turkey U-19	34	(0)
2010–2013	Turkey	7	(0)
- * Club domestic league appearances and goals as of May 10, 2014 ‡ National team caps and goals as of October 31, 2013

Zübeyde Kaya (born July 5, 1991) is a Turkish women's football defender, who most recently played in the Turkish Women's First League for Kdz. Ereğlispor. She was part of the Turkey girls' national U-17, Turkey women's U-19 and Turkey women's national teams.

== Playing career ==
=== Club ===
Zübeyde Kaya obtained her license for Gazi Üniversitesispor in Ankara on May 31, 2004. She played until the end of the 2011–12 season capping 59 times and scoring four goals. In the 2009–10 season, she enjoyed her club's championship title in the Women's First League. She took part at three matches of the 2010–11 UEFA Champions League – Group 1 matches for Gazi Üniversitesispor.

In October 2012, Kaya was transferred by Kdz. Ereğlispor, where she played two seasons appearing in 33 matches.

=== International ===
She was admitted to the Turkey girls' national U-17 team and debuted in the friendly match against Azerbaijan on May 27, 2007. She played in seven matches and scored one goal for the national U-17 team.

Her first appearance in the Turkey women's U-19 team was in the friendly game against Bılgaria on May 5, 2007. She played in total 34 matches until 2010.

Kaya was called up to the national team, and played in the 2011 FIFA Women's World Cup qualification – UEFA Group 5 matches debuting in the game against England on July 29, 2010. She later participated at the UEFA Women's Euro 2013 qualifying – Group 2 matches, and also at a 2015 FIFA Women's World Cup qualification – UEFA Group 6 match. Zübeyde Kaya capped in seven matches for the Turkey women's national team.

During the UEFA Women's Euro 2013 qualifying home match against Germany on February 15, 2012, she broke her collar bone.

== Career statistics ==
As of May 10, 2014

Club	Season	League			Continental		National		Total	
Club	Season	Division	Apps	Goals	Apps	Goals	Apps	Goals	Apps	Goals
Gazi Üniversitesispor	2006–2009	First League	14	2	–	–	26	1	40	3
Gazi Üniversitesispor	2009–10	First League	17	0	–	–	15	0	32	0
Gazi Üniversitesispor	2010–11	First League	20	2	3	0	2	0	25	2
Gazi Üniversitesispor	2011–12	First League	8	0	–	–	4	0	12	0
Gazi Üniversitesispor	Total		59	4	3	0	47	1	109	5
Kdz. Ereğlispor	2012–13	First League	18	1	–	–	0	0	18	1
Kdz. Ereğlispor	2013–14	First League	15	0	–	–	1	0	16	0
Kdz. Ereğlispor	Total		33	1	–	–	1	0	34	1
Career total			92	5	3	0	48	1	143	6

== Honors ==
Turkish Women's First League

Gazi Üniversitesispor
Winners (1): 2009–10
Third places (1): 2008–09

Kdz. Ereğlispor
Third places (1): 2012–13
