= Tuğba Karataş =

Turkish footballer (born 1992)

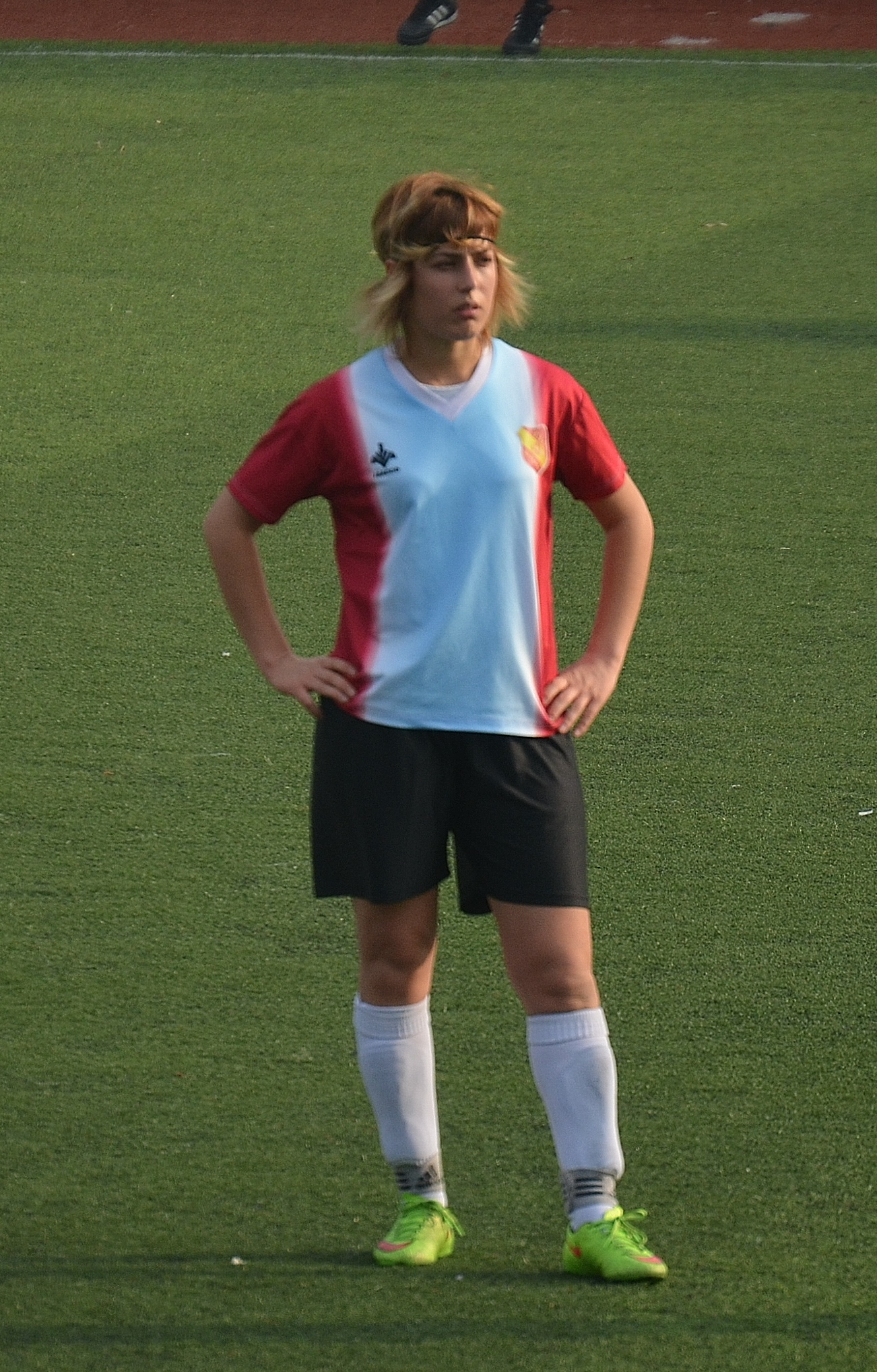
- Tuğba Karataş for Trabzon İdmanocağı (December 2014)

Personal information
- Date of birth: March 17, 1992 (age 34)
- Place of birth: Delice, Kırıkkale, Turkey
- Position: Midfielder

Team information
- Current team: Ankara BB Fomget GS
- Number: 23

Senior career*
Years	Team	Apps	(Gls)
2004–2012	Gazi Üniversitesispor	67	(25)
2012–2014	Kdz. Ereğlispor	33	(1)
2014–2018	Trabzon İdmanocağı	55	(6)
2020–2021	Fomget G.S.	10	(3)
2021–2022	Fatih Vatan Spor	21	(0)
2022–	Ankara BB Fomget GS	11	(0)

International career^{‡}
2007–2008	Turkey U-17	11	(0)
2009	Turkey U-19	6	(0)
2022–	Turkey	1	(0)
- * Club domestic league appearances and goals as of 5 February 2023 ‡ National team caps and goals as of 7 April 2022

Tuğba Karataş (March 17, 1992) is a Turkish women's football midfielder, who plays in the Turkish Women's Super League for Ankara BB Fomget GS with jersey number 23. She was part of the Turkey women's national U-17, U-19 and A teams.

== Club career ==
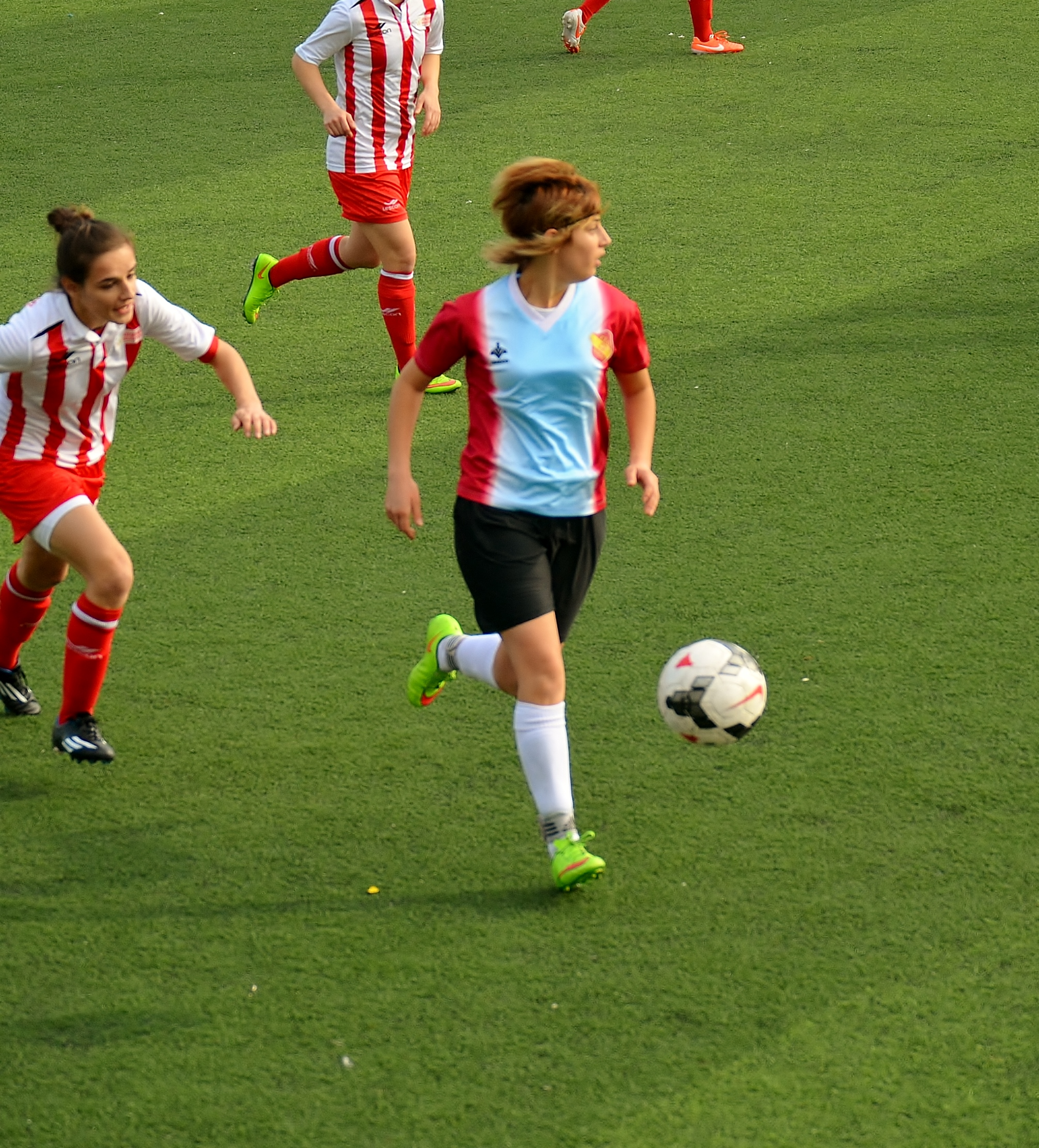
Tuğba Karataş playing for Trabzon İdmanocağı in the 2014–15 season's away match against Ataşehir Belediyespor

Tuğba Karataş obtained her license on May 31, 2004, for Gazi Üniversitesispor, where she played until the end of the 2011–12 season. She enjoyed league champion titles in the 2007–08 and 2009–10 seasons. She capped 66 times in total and scored 25 goals for Gazi Üniversitesispor. Karataş took part at the 2010–11 UEFA Women's Champions League qualifying round- – Group 1 matches with Gazi Üniversitesispor. In the 2012–13 season, she played for Kdz. Ereğlispor, where she appeared in 18 games. After one season, Karataş transferred to Trabzon İdmanocağı.

In the 2020–21 Turkish Women's League season, she played for the Ankara-based club Fomhet Gençlik ve Spor.

She transferred to Fatih Vatan Spor in Istanbul for the 2021–22 Turkish Women's Super League.

== International career ==
Tuğba Karataş was admitted to the Turkey gitls' national U-17 team and debuted in the friendly match against Azerbaijan on May 27, 2007. She took part at the 2008 UEFA Championship qualifying round – Group 6 and 2009 UEFA Championship qualifying round – Group 5 matches. She capped in 11 games.

On April 15, 2009, she played for the first time in the Turkey women's U-19 team at the friendly match against Belarus. Karataş played at the 2010 UEFA Championship First qualifying round – Group 7 matches. She was in 6 matches of the Turkey women's U-19 team.

She was called up to the Turkey women's national team to play at the UEFA Euro 2013 qualifying – Group 2 matches; however, she sat on the bench. On 7 April 2022, she debuted for the Turkey national team in the 2023 FIFA Women's World Cup qualification match against Bulgaria.

== Career statistics ==
As of 5 February 2023

Club	Season	League			Continental		National		Total	
Club	Season	Division	Apps	Goals	Apps	Goals	Apps	Goals	Apps	Goals
Gazi Üniversitesispor	2007–2009	First League	16	3	–	–	12	0	28	3
Gazi Üniversitesispor	2009–10	First League	12	5	–	–	5	0	17	5
Gazi Üniversitesispor	2010–11	First League	21	15	3	0	0	0	24	15
Gazi Üniversitesispor	2011–12	First League	18	2	–	–	0	0	18	2
Gazi Üniversitesispor	Total		67	25	3	0	17	0	87	25
Kdz. Ereğlispor	2012–13	First League	18	0	–	–	0	0	18	0
Kdz. Ereğlispor	2013–14	First League	15	1	–	–	0	0	15	1
Kdz. Ereğlispor	Total		33	1	–	–	0	0	33	1
Trabzon İdmanocağı	2014–15	First League	15	1	–	–	0	0	15	1
Trabzon İdmanocağı	2015–16	First League	17	4	–	–	0	0	17	4
Trabzon İdmanocağı	2016–17	First League	16	0	–	–	0	0	16	0
Trabzon İdmanocağı	2017–18	First League	7	1	–	–	0	0	7	1
Trabzon İdmanocağı	Total		55	6	–	–	0	0	55	6
Fomget G.S.	2019–20	First League	4	0	–	–	0	0	4	0
Fomget G.S.	2020–21	First League	6	3	–	–	0	0	6	3
Fomget G.S.	Total		10	3	–	–	0	0	10	3
Fatih Vatan Spor	2021–22	Super League	21	0	–	–	1	0	22	0
Fatih Vatan Spor	Total		21	0	–	–	1	0	22	0
Ankara BB Fomget GS	2022–23	FSuper League	11	0	–	–	0	0	11	0
Ankara BB Fomget GS	Total		11	0	–	–	0	0	11	0
Career total			197	35	3	0	18	0	218	35

== Honours ==
Turkey Women's First Football League

Gazi Üniversitesispor
Winners (2): 2007–08, 2009–10
Third places (1): 2008–09

Kdz. Ereğlispor
Third places (1): 2012–13

Trabzon İdmanocağı
Third places (1): 2014–15
