= Eylül Elgalp =

Turkish footballer (born 1991)

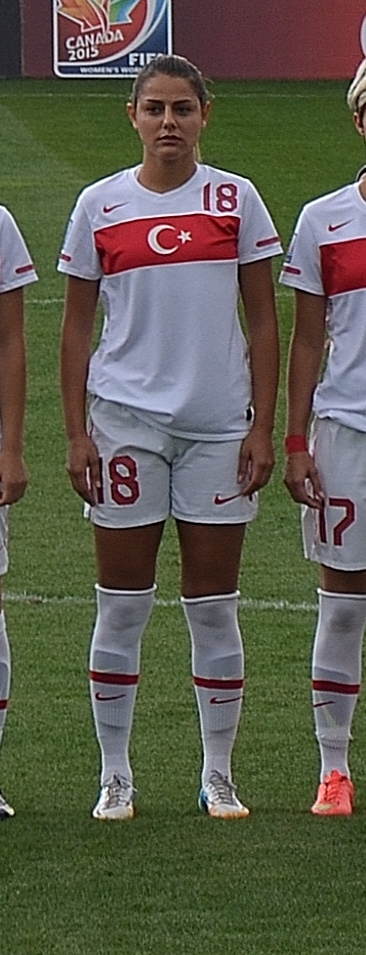
- Eylül Elgalp (September 2014)

Personal information
- Date of birth: January 9, 1991 (age 35)
- Place of birth: Seyhan, Adana Province, Turkey
- Position: Forward

Team information
- Current team: Konak Belediyespor
- Number: 8

Senior career*
Years	Team	Apps	(Gls)
2005–2010	Adana İdmanyurdu	26	(10)
2010–2011	Trabzonspor	22	(23)
2011–2013	Lüleburgaz 39 Spor	22	(10)
2013–2015	Konak Belediyespor	22	(10)
Total		92	(53)

International career^{‡}
2006–2007	Turkey U-17	10	(7)
2006–2010	Turkey U-19	38	(16)
2007–2014	Turkey	25	(2)
- * Club domestic league appearances and goals as of March 22, 2015 ‡ National team caps and goals as of September 17, 2014

Eylül Elgalp (born January 9, 1991) is a Turkish women's footballer who plays as a forward. She last played in the First League for Konak Belediyespor. She made her Champions League debut in 2013. She is a member of the Turkish national team since 2010.

== Life ==
Eylül Elgalp was born on January 9, 1991, in Seyhan district of Adana Province in southern Turkey.

== Playing career ==
=== Club ===
Elgalp began football playing in her early age at Adana İdmanyurdu in her hometown. After eight years of playing in Adana, she was transferred by the Black Sea-based club Trabzonspor, where she scored 23 goals in the 2010–11 season of the Women's First League. After one season with Trabzonspor, she moved to Lüleburgaz 39 Spor in northwestern Turkey.

She scored a total of 44 goals in 70 Women's First League matches she played including the 2012–13 season. In July 2013, Eylül Elgalp left her team Lüleburgaz 39 Spor after two seasons, and signed for the İzmir-based Konak Belediyespor, which had newly become league champion, and would compete at the UEFA Women's Champions League. She made her Champions League debut at the 2013–14 UEFA Women's Champions League on August 8, 2013, against FC NSA Sofia.

She retired after the 2014-15 Women's First League season.

=== International ===
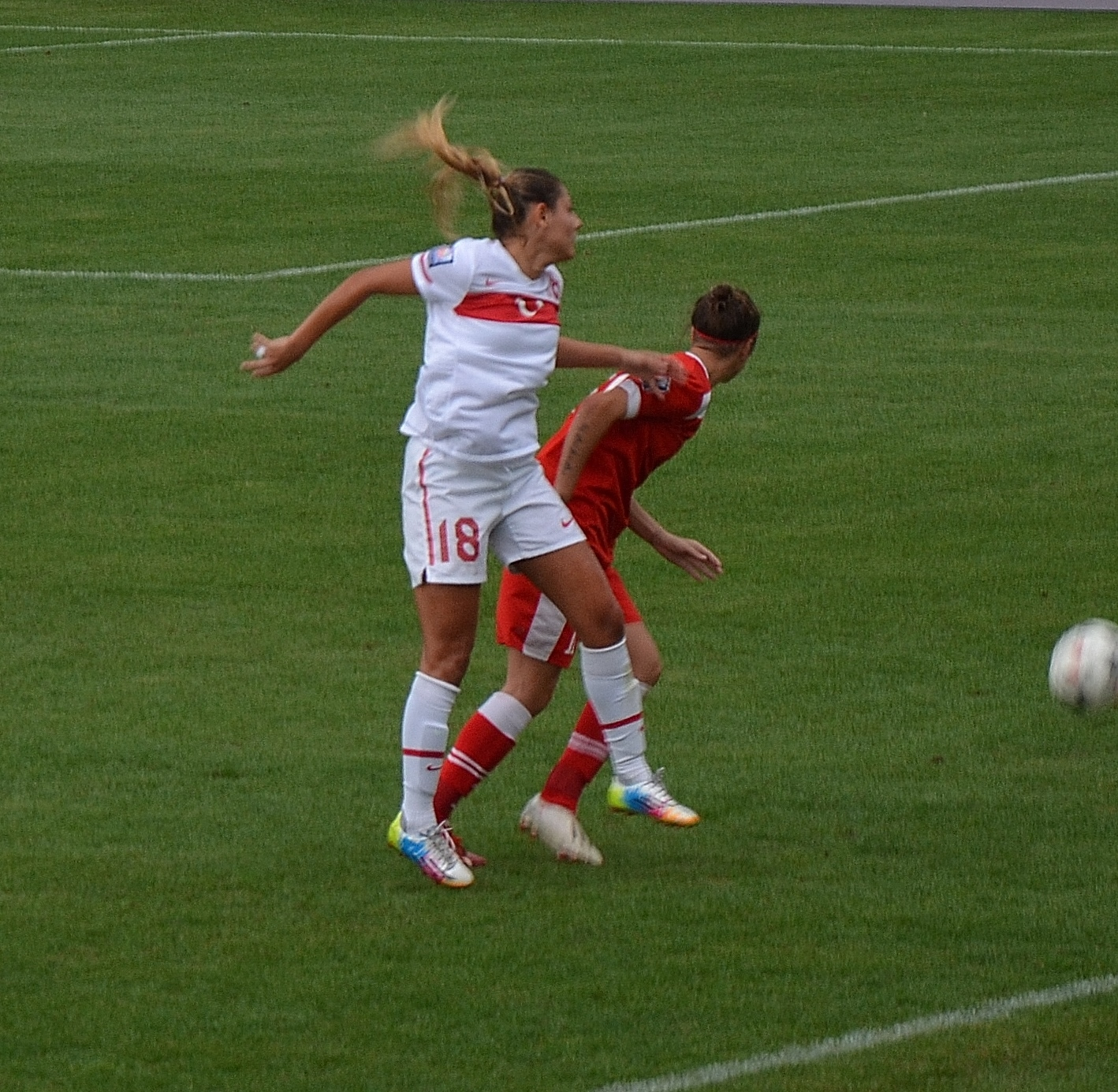
Eylül Elgalp (white kit) in the 2015 FIFA Women's World Cup qualification – UEFA Group 6 match against Belarus.

In January 2006, Elgalp became part of the U-17 and U-19 national teams. She played for the first time in national team at the match against Switzerland at the 2007 UEFA Women's U-19 Championship First qualifying round. She scored the decisive only goal in the friendly match against Russian side in 2010. She served as captain of the U-19 national team.

Since 2010 in the national team, she scored the only goal for her country's team at the 2011 FIFA Women's World Cup qualification – UEFA Group 5 match against Spain in 2010.

International goals
Date	Venue	Opponent	Competition	Result	Scored
Turkey women's U-17 national football team
May 2, 2006	Macedonia	Macedonia	Friendly	5–0	1
September 15, 2007	Gelibolu Stadium, Gelibolu, Çanakkale Province, Turkey	Macedonia	Friendly	4–0	2
October 21, 2007	Topkapı Palace Field, Antalya, Turkey	Sweden	2008 UEFA Women's U-17 Championship qualifying round	1–3	1
October 24, 2007	Topkapı Palace Field, Antalya, Turkey	Moldova	2008 UEFA Women's U-17 Championship qualifying round	7–0	3
Turkey women's U-19 national football team
May 5, 2007	Edirne 25 Kasım Stadium, Edirne, Turkey	Bulgaria	Friendly	3–0	3
September 16, 2007	Gelibolu Stadium, Gelibolu, Turkey	Macedonia	Friendly	3–1	1
September 29, 2007	Stadium LKS Przeboj, Wolbrom, Poland	Austria	2008 UEFA Women's U-19 Championship qualifying round	2–3	1
March 19, 2009	Trud Stadium, Tomsk, Russia	Estonia	2009 Kuban Spring Tournament	2–1	2
August 15, 2009	Sakarya Atatürk Stadium, Sakarya, Turkey	Moldova	Friendly	5–0	2
August 17, 2009	Sakarya Atatürk Stadium, Sakarya, Turkey	Moldova	Friendly	8–0	1
September 24, 2009	Buca Arena Buca, Turkey	Georgia	2010 UEFA Women's U-19 Championship First qualifying round – Group 7	13–0	5
February 5, 2010	Mardan Sports Complex Antalya, Turkey	Russia	Friendly	1–0	1
Turkey women's national football team
May 11, 2009	Mikheil Meskhi Stadium, Tbilisi, Georgia	Azerbaijan	2009 UEFA Support International Tournament	1–0	1
April 7, 2010	Estadio Pedro Escartín, Guadalajara, Spain	Spain	2011 FIFA Women's World Cup qualification – UEFA Group 5	1–5	1

== Career statistics ==
As of March 22, 2015.

Club	Season	League			Continental		National		Total	
Club	Season	Division	Apps	Goals	Apps	Goals	Apps	Goals	Apps	Goals
Adana İdmanyurduspor	2006–08	First League			–	–	27	12	27	12
Adana İdmanyurduspor	2008–09	Second League	8	3	–	–	11	3	19	6
Adana İdmanyurduspor	2009–10	First League	18	7	–	–	19	10	37	17
Adana İdmanyurduspor	Total		26	10	–	–	57	25	83	35
Trabzonspor	2010–11	First League	22	23	–	–	4	0	26	23
Trabzonspor	Total		22	23	–	–	4	0	26	23
Lüleburgaz 39 Spor	2011–12	First League	19	9	–	–	11	0	30	9
Lüleburgaz 39 Spor	2012–13	First League	3	1	–	–	0	0	3	1
Lüleburgaz 39 Spor	Total		22	10	–	–	11	0	32	11
Konak Belediyespor	2013–14	First League	14	8	5	0	1	0	20	8
Konak Belediyespor	2014–15	First League	8	2	–	–	1	0	9	2
Konak Belediyespor	Total		22	10	5	0	2	0	29	10
Career total			92	53	5	0	74	25	171	79

== Honours ==
Turkish Women's First League

Konak Belediyespor
Winners (2): 2013–14, 2014–15
