= Yaşam Göksu =

Turkish footballer (born 1995)

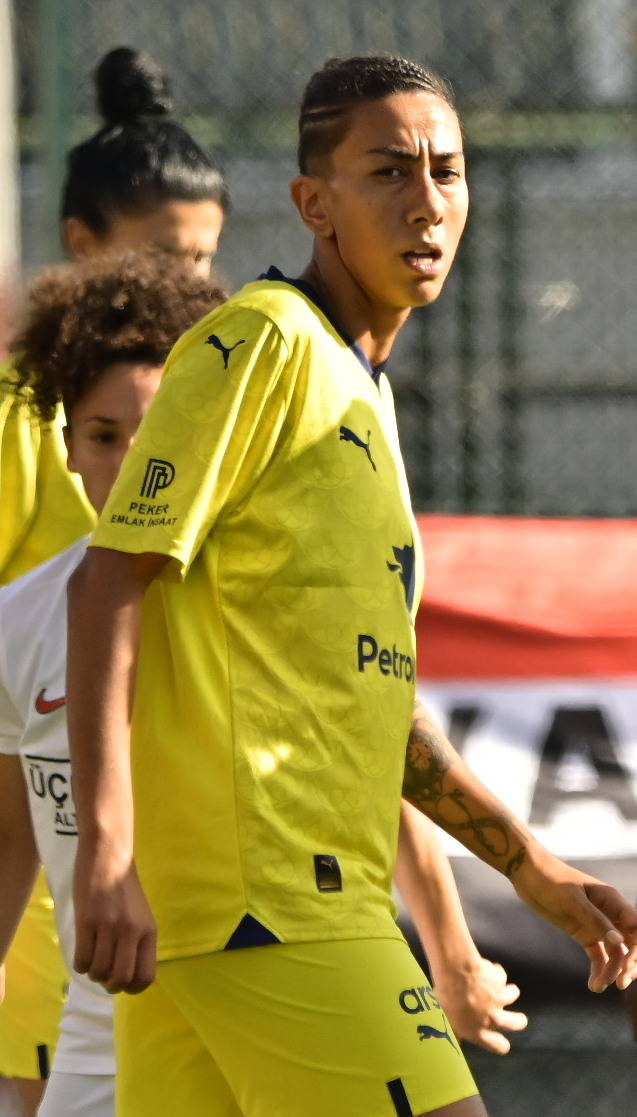
- Yaşam Göksu in 2023

Personal information
- Date of birth: September 25, 1995 (age 31)
- Place of birth: Konak, İzmir Province, Turkey
- Position: Defender

Team information
- Current team: Fenerbahçe
- Number: 4

Senior career*
Years	Team	Apps	(Gls)
2007–2015	Konak Belediyespor	126	(12)
2015–2017	1207 Antalyaspor	38	(6)
2017–2018	Konak Belediyespor	19	(2)
2018–2019	ALG Sspor	17	(1)
2019–2021	Konak Belediyespor	15	(5)
2021	SE AEM		
2021–2022	Konak Belediyespor	8	(1)
2022–	Fenerbahçe	69	(13)

International career^{‡}
2009–2010	Turkey U-15	8	(0)
2010–2011	Turkey U-17	8	(2)
2012–2014	Turkey U-19	35	(5)
2014	Turkey U-21	1	(0)
2014–	Turkey	10	(0)
- * Club domestic league appearances and goals as of 1 August 2022 ‡ National team caps and goals as of 5 April 2024

Yaşam Göksu (born September 25, 1995) is a Turkish female footballer who plays as a defender in the Turkish Women's Football Super League for Fenerbahçe. She has been part of the Turkey women's national football teams since 2010.

== Private life ==
Yaşam Göksu was born in Konak İzmir Province, Turkey on September 25, 1995. She has two elder brothers.

== Playing career ==
=== Club ===
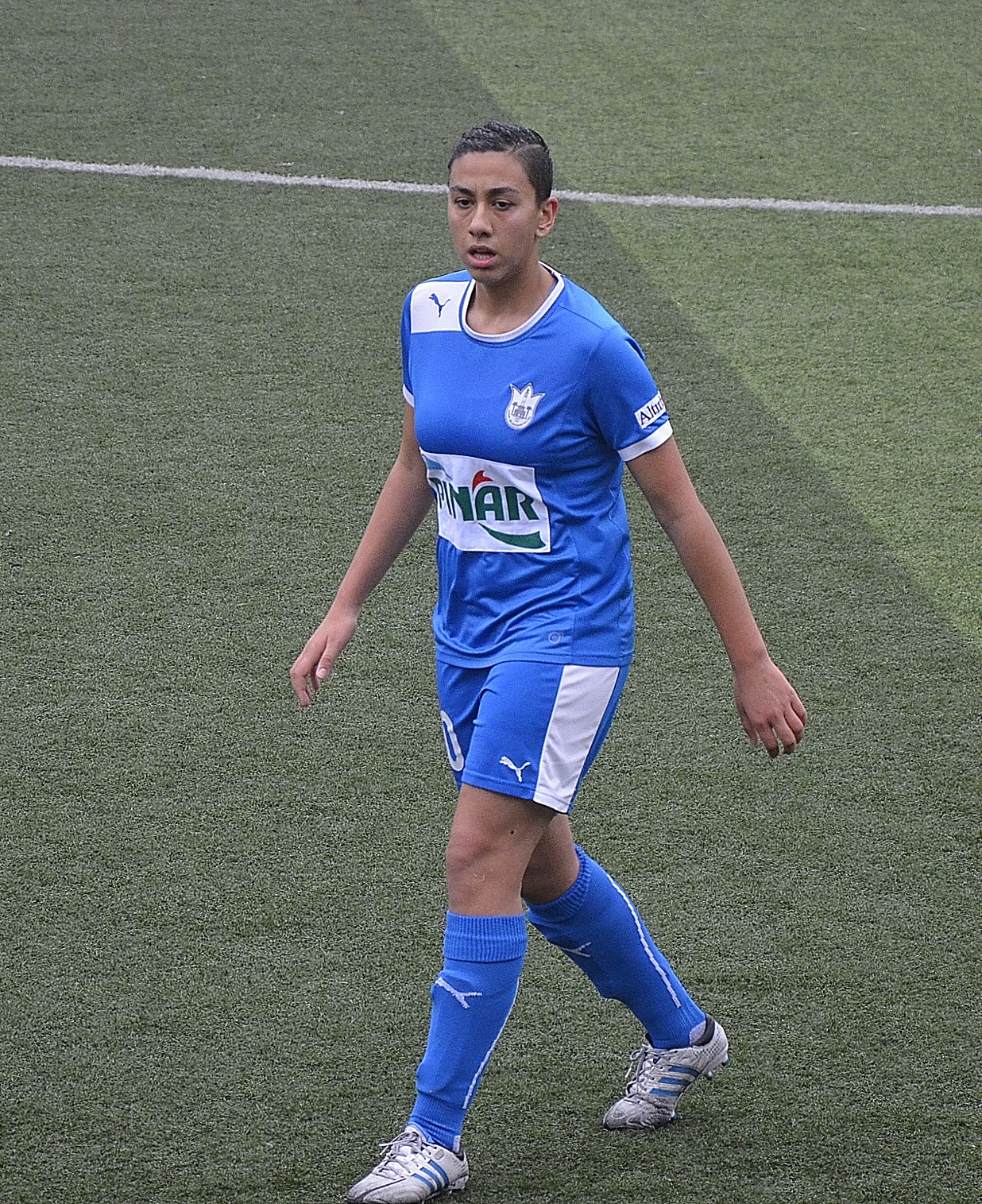
Yaşam Göksu for Konak Belediyespor in the 2013–14 season

Yaşam Göksu obtained her license on March 2, 2007, and was admitted to the Konak Belediyespor club in her hometown. Already in the 2008–09 season, she became part of the team competing in the Women's First League. As of the 2013–14 season, she capped 110 times and scored 10 goals for Konak Belediyespor. During this period, she enjoyed two consecutive champion titles, in the 2012–13 and 2013–14 season with her club.

Debuting in the match against FC NSA Sofia on August 8, 2013, she appeared in seven matches of the 2013–14 UEFA Women's Champions League, at which her team advanced to the Round of 16.

In the 2015–16 season, she transferred to 1207 Antalya Muratpaşa Belediye Spor.

After two seasons with 1207 Antayaspor, Göksu returned to her gormer club Konak Belediyespor in the 2017–18 season.

In October 2018, she joined the Gaziantep-based club ALG Spor, which were promoted to the Women's First League in the 2018–19 season. The next season, she returned to her hometown club Konak Belediyespor.

On 22 January 2021, she moved to Spain, and joined the Lleida-based club SE AEM to play in the Women's Segunda División Pro of Spain.

For the 2021–22 Turkcell Super League season, she returned home to play in her former club Konak Belediyespor.

=== International ===
Göksu became international playing for the Turkey Girls' U-15 national team in the 2010 Summer Youth Olympics qualifying round match against Georgia on October 12, 2009. She capped two times for the Turkey U-15 team.

Debuting in the match against the girls from England on October 3, 2010, she was part of the Turkey girls' national U-17 team in the four matches of the 2010 Summer Youth Olympics – Girls' tournament in Singapore, at which Turkey took the bronze medal. She played in all three matches of the 2011 UEFA Women's Under-17 Championship – Group 6 round. She capped 8 times in total for the Turkey U-17 team and scored two goals.

She appeared for the Turkey U-19 team playing in two games of the 2012 UEFA Women's Under-19 Championship – Group A round. Later, she took part at two matches of the 2013 UEFA Women's U-19 Championship First qualifying round – Group 5 scoring two goals, three matches of the 2014 UEFA Women's Under-19 Championship First qualifying round – Group 10, and three games of the 2014 UEFA Women's Under-19 Championship Second qualifying round – Group 5 competitions.

On May 7, 2014, Yaşam Göksu debuted at the 2015 FIFA Women's World Cup qualification – UEFA Group 6 match playing for the Turkey women's national team against Belarus on May 7, 2015. After five years, she was called up again to the national team to play at the UEFA Women's Euro 2022 qualifying Group A matches.

International goals (Friendly matches not included)
Date	Venue	Opponent	Competition	Result	Scored
Turkey U-19
October 25, 2012	WOW Sport Center, Antalya, Turkey	Belarus	2013 UEFA Women's Under-19 Championship first qualifying round Group 5	W 2–0	2
March 10, 2013	Sputnik Sport Center, Sochi, Russia	Russia	Kuban Spring Tournament	W 1–0	1

== Career statistics ==
As of match played 1 August 2022.

Club	Season	League			Continental		National		Total	
Club	Season	Division	Apps	Goals	Apps	Goals	Apps	Goals	Apps	Goals
Konak Belediyespor	2008–09	First League	17	0	–	–	0	0	17	0
Konak Belediyespor	2009–10	First League	18	0	–	–	4	0	22	0
Konak Belediyespor	2010–11	First League	22	5	–	–	11	2	33	7
Konak Belediyespor	2011–12	First League	20	1	–	–	9	0	29	1
Konak Belediyespor	2012–13	First League	16	2	–	–	12	3	28	5
Konak Belediyespor	2013–14	First League	17	2	7	0	16	2	40	4
Konak Belediyespor	2014–15	First League	16	2	3	0	3	0	22	2
Konak Belediyespor	Total		126	12	10	0	55	7	191	19
1207 Antalyaspor	2015–16	First League	15	3	–	–	0	0	15	3
1207 Antalyaspor	2016–17	First League	23	3	–	–	0	0	23	3
1207 Antalyaspor	Total		38	6	–	–	0	0	38	6
Konak Belediyespor	2017–18	First League	19	2	–	–	0	0	19	2
Konak Belediyespor	Total		19	2	–	–	0	0	19	2
ALG Spor	2018–19	First League	17	1	–	–	0	0	17	1
ALG Spor	Total		17	1	–	–	0	0	17	1
Konak Belediyespor	2019–20	First League	14	4	–	–	0	0	14	4
Konak Belediyespor	2020–21	First League	1	1	–	–	1	0	2	1
Konak Belediyespor	Total		15	5	–	–	1	0	16	5
SE AEM	2021-22	Segunda División Pro			–	–				
SE AEM	Total				–	–				
Konak Belediyespor	2021–22	Super League	8	1	–	–	2	0	10	1
Konak Belediyespor	Total		8	1	–	–	2	0	10	1
Career total			223	27	10	0	58	7	288	34

== Honours ==
Turkish Women's First League

Konak Belediyespor
Winners (3): 2012–13, 2013–14, 2014–15
Runners-up (1): 2010–11
Third places (3): 2009–10, 2017–18, 2019–20

ALG Spor
Runners-up (1): 2018–19

Fenerbahçe
Winners (1): 2025–26
