= Başak Ersoy =

Turkish footballer (born 1991)

Personal information
- Date of birth: 23 October 1991 (age 35)
- Place of birth: Mersin, Turkey
- Position: Midfielder

Team information
- Current team: Adana İdmanyurduspor
- Number: 19

Senior career*
Years	Team	Apps	(Gls)
2004–2010	Mersin Camspor	17	(10)
2010	Gazi Üniversitesispor	5	(2)
2010–2013	Ataşehir Belediyespor	41	(7)
2014	Hakkarigücü Spor	3	(3)
2014	Siirt Hasbey Spor	7	(2)
2015–2017	Ağrı Birlik Spor	32	(11)
2017–2018	Osmaniye Demirspor	10	(4)
2018–2019	Osmaniye Kadın Spor	1	(0)
2019–	Adana İdmanyurduspor	19	(2)

International career^{‡}
2007	Turkey U-17	13	(4)
2006–2010	Turkey U-19	47	(9)
2008–2012	Turkey	16	(1)
- * Club domestic league appearances and goals as of 29 December 2021 ‡ National team caps and goals as of 15 February 2012

Başak Ersoy (born 23 October 1991) is a Turkish women's football midfielder currently playing in the Turkish Women's Second Football League for FAdana İdmanyurduspor in the Turkish Women's Super League with jersey number 19. She was member of the Turkey women's national team between 2008 and 2012.

== Career ==
=== Club ===
Başak Ersoy obtained her license on 30 April 2004. She played in the local team Mersin Camspor until the end of 2009. In February 2010, she moved to Gazi Üniversitesispor in Ankara. For the 2010–11 season, she transferred to Ataşehir Belediyespor in Istanbul, where she played three seasons. Currently, she is part of the Second League team Ağrı Birlik Spor.

Ersoy moved to Osmaniye Demirspor in the 2017-18 Women's Second League season. The next season, her club was renamed to Osmaniye Kadın Spor.

In 2019, she transferred to the Women's First League club Adana İdmanyurduspor. In the 2021-22 season, she plays in the renamed league of Women's Super League.

=== International ===
She was member of the national U-17, U-19 and the senior teams. She took part at five matches of the UEFA Women's Euro 2013 qualifying – Group 2 round.

== Career statistics ==
As of match played 29 December 2021.

Club	Season	League			Continental		National		Total	
Club	Season	Division	Apps	Goals	Apps	Goals	Apps	Goals	Apps	Goals
Mersin Camspor	2005–2008	First League	2	0	–	–	51	8	53	8
Mersin Camspor	2008–09	First League	15	10	–	–	5	1	20	11
Mersin Camspor	Total		17	10	–	–	56	9	73	19
Gazi Üniversitesispor	2009–10	First League	5	2	–	–	13	5	18	7
Gazi Üniversitesispor	Total		5	2	–	–	13	5	18	7
Ataşehir Belediyespor	2010–11	First League	17	3	–	–	1	0	18	3
Ataşehir Belediyespor	2011–12	First League	18	4	–	–	5	0	23	4
Ataşehir Belediyespor	2012–13	First League	6	0	–	–	0	0	6	0
Ataşehir Belediyespor	Total		41	7	–	–	6	0	47	7
Hakkarigücü Spor	2013–14	Second League	3	3	–	–	0	0	3	3
Hakkarigücü Spor	Total		3	3	–	–	0	0	3	3
Siirt Hasbey Spor	2014–15	Second Lwague	7	2	–	–	0	0	7	2
Siirt Hasbey Spor	Total		7	2	–	–	0	0	7	2
Ağrı Birlik Spor	2014–15	Second League	5	6	–	–	0	0	5	6
Ağrı Birlik Spor	2015–16	Second League	17	3	–	–	0	0	17	3
Ağrı Birlik Spor	2016–17	Second League	10	2	–	–	0	0	10	2
Total			32	11	–	–	0	0	32	11
Osmaniye Demirspor	2017-18	Second League	10	4	–	–	0	0	10	4
Osmaniye Demirspor	Total		10	4	–	–	0	0	10	4
Osmaniye Kadın Spor	2018-19	Second League	1	0	–	–	0	0	1	0
Osmaniye Kadın Spor	Total		1	0	–	–	0	0	1	0
Adana İdmanyurduspor	2019–20	First League	16	2	–	–	0	0	16	2
Adana İdmanyurduspor	2021–22	Super League	3	0	–	–	0	0	3	0
Adana İdmanyurduspor	Total		19	2	–	–	0	0	19	2
Career total			135	41	–	–	75	14	210	55

== Honours ==
Turkish Women's First Football League
Gazi Üniversitesispor

Winners (1):2009–10

Ataşehir Belediyespor

Winners (2): 2010–11, 2011–12
Runners-up (1): 2012–13
