= Didem Karagenç =

Turkish footballer (born 1993)

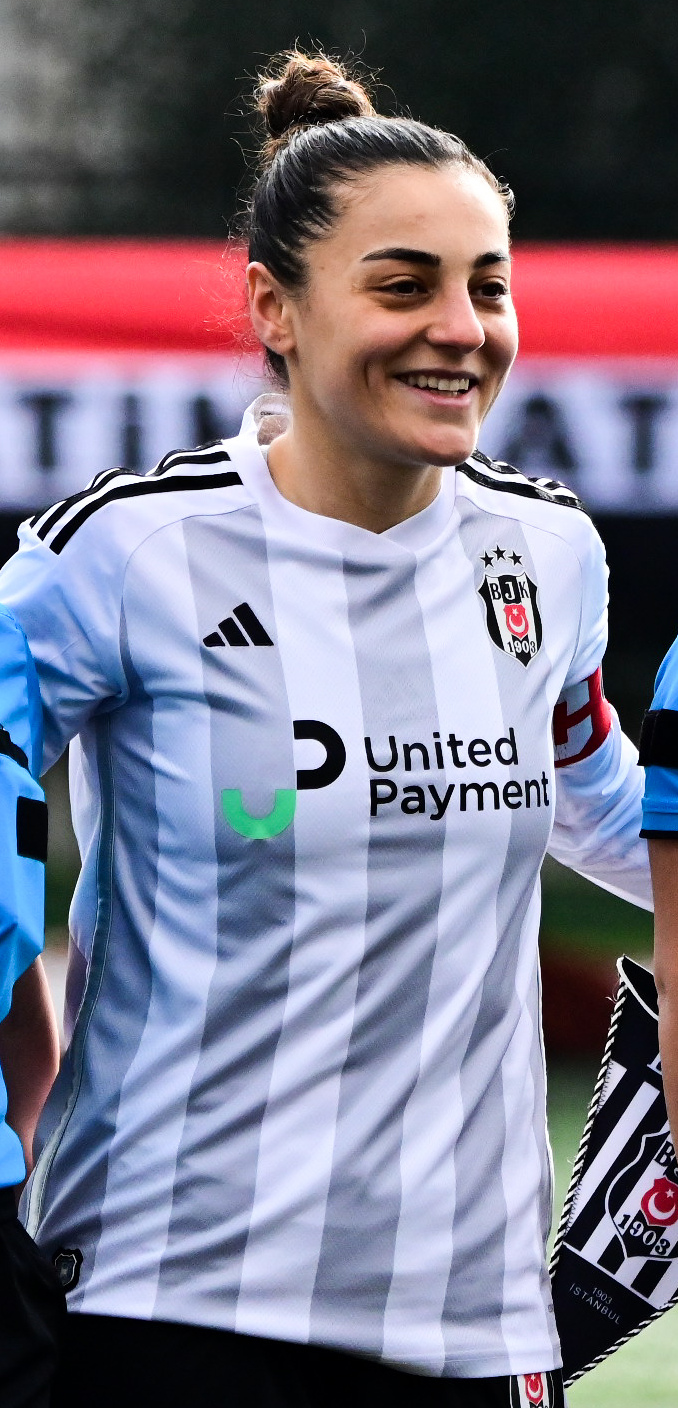
- Didem Karagenç (January 2024)

Personal information
- Date of birth: 16 October 1993 (age 33)
- Place of birth: Ankara, Turkey
- Position: Defender

Team information
- Current team: Beşiktaş (head coach)

Senior career*
Years	Team	Apps	(Gls)
2004–2007	Sakarya Yenikent Güneşspor		
2007–2012	Gazi Üniversitesispor	69	(32)
2012–2015	Konak Belediyespor	47	(1)
2015–2026	Beşiktaş	188	(17)

International career
2008–2010	Turkey U-17	16	(2)
2009–2012	Turkey U-19	32	(1)
2014	Turkey U-21	1	(0)
2010–2025	Turkey	83	(3)

Managerial career
- 2026–: Beşiktaş
- * Club domestic league appearances and goals

Didem Karagenç (born 16 October 1993)is a Turkish women's football manager and former professional footballer who is currently head coach of Turkish Women's Football Super League club Beşiktaş. She played as a defender.

== Personal life ==
Didem Karagenç was born in Ankara, Turkey, on 16 October 1993. She works as a teacher of physical education and sports in a school.

== Club career ==
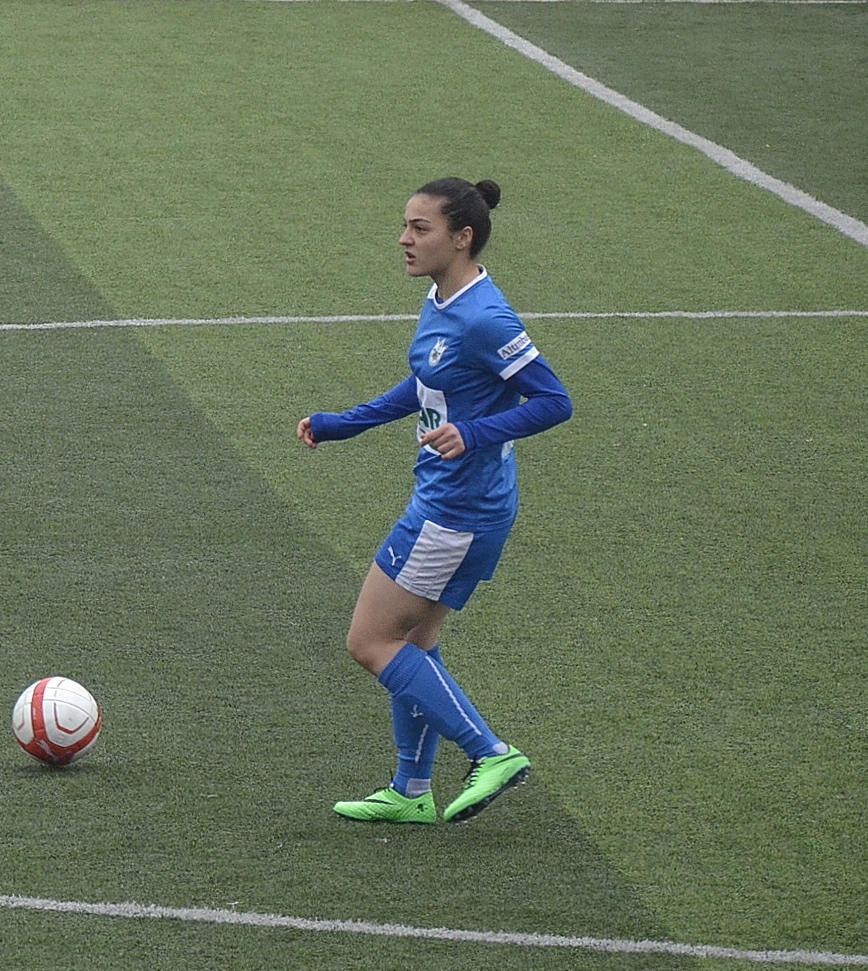
Didem Karagenç for Konak Belediyespor in the 2013–14 season.

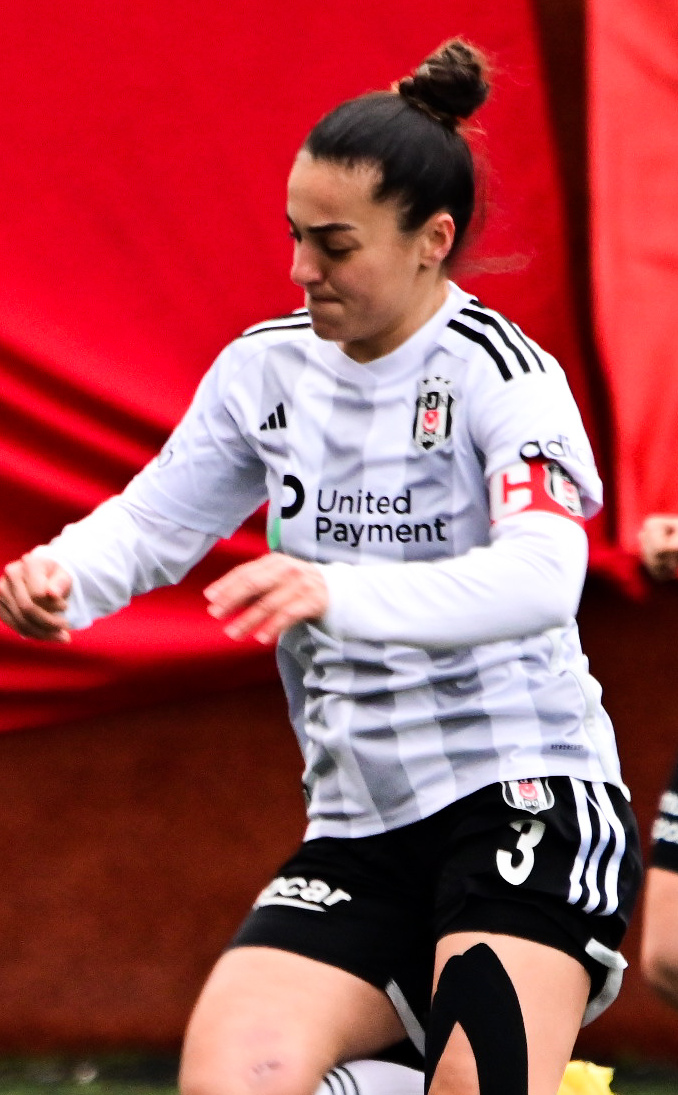
Didem Karagenç with Beşiktaş J.K. in the 2023–24 season.

Karagenç received her license for Sakarya Yenikent Güneşspor on 27 October 2004, where she was until January 2007. During this time, no leagues were held in the country. With the reestablishment of the women's football leagues, she transferred to her hometown club Gazi Üniversitesispor. In the six seasons, she played for Gazi Üniversitesispor, she capped 70 times, scored a total of 32 goals, and enjoyed three league championships in 2006–07, 2007–08 and 2009–10.

For the 2012–13 season, she signed for te İzmir-based club Konak Belediyespor. She became again champion in her first season with the team.

She played with Konak Belediyespor at the 2013–14 UEFA Women's Champions League in the qualification round matches in August 2013 and in the knockout stage matches in October 2013.

By October 2015, she transferred to the Istanbul-based team Beşiktaş J.K. to play in the Second League. At the end of the 2015–16 season, she enjoyed the league champion title and the promotion of her team to the First League. At the end of the 2018-19 First League season, she enjoyed the champion title of her team. She took part at the 2019–20 UEFA Women's Champions League - Group 9 matches.

In the 2020-21 Turkcell Women's Football League season, she enjoyed the second champion title with her team. She played in two matches of the 2021–22 UEFA Women's Champions League qualifying rounds.

== International career ==
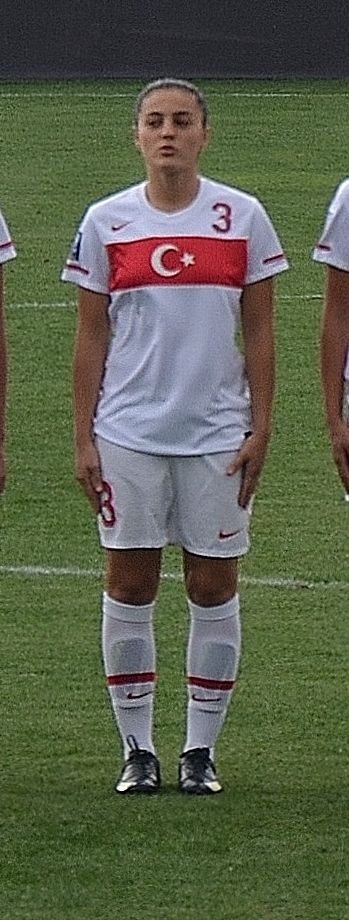
Didem Karagenç for Turkey women's national football team in the home match against Belarus

Didem Karagenç was called up to the Turkey girls' U-17 national team debuting in the match against Ireland at the 2009 UEFA Women's U-17 Championship qualifying round on 18 October 2008. She played also against the teams Netherlands and Faroe Islands at the same competition. She participated at the 2010 UEFA Women's U-17 Championship qualifying playing against Denmark, Ireland and Slovenia. She capped 16 times and scored two goals in the girls' U-17 national team.

On 19 September 2009 she made her first appearance in the women's U-19 national team playing against Serbia at the 2010 UEFA Women's U-19 Championship First qualifying round – Group 7 match. At the same tournament, she played also against France and Georgia. Karagenç participated at the 2010 UEFA Women's U-19 Championship Second qualifying round – Group 1 matches against Sweden, Ireland and England. her further appearances in the women's U-19 national team were at the 2011 UEFA Women's U-19 Championship First qualifying round – Group 9 (Romania, Czech Republic and Northern Ireland), at the 2012 UEFA Women's U-19 Championship Second qualifying round (Iceland, Germany and Wales) as well as at the 2012 UEFA Women's U-19 Championship – Group A (Portugal, Denmark and Romania). In the women's U-19 national team, she capped 32 times netting one goal.

She played for the first time for the women's national team on 15 April 2009 in a friendly match with Belarusian women. Karagenç was team member in the 2011 FIFA Women's World Cup qualification – UEFA Group 5 match against Austria. She played in nine matches of the UEFA Women's Euro 2013 qualifying – Group 2 round against Germany, Switzerland, Spain, Romania and Kazakhstan. In 2013, Karagenç took part at the 2015 FIFA Women's World Cup qualification – UEFA Group 6 matches against the English and Montenegron women.

Karagenç appeared in four games of the UEFA Women's Euro 2017 qualifying Group 5 against Croatia, Russia and Hungary.

International goals (Friendly matches not included)
Date	Venue	Opponent	Competition	Result	Scored
Turkey U-19
March 8, 2012	Sputnik Sport Center, Sochi, Russia	China	Kuban Spring Tournament	W 2–0	1
Turkey
April 8, 2017	Tórsvøllur, Tórshavn, Faroe Islands	Luxembourg	2019 FIFA Women's World Cup qualification – UEFA preliminary round - Group 4	W 9–1	1
October 27, 2020	Sapsan Arena, Moscow, Russia	Russia	UEFA Women's Euro 2022 qualifying Group A	L 2–4	1

== Career statistics ==
As of match played 8 April 2023.

Club	Season	League			Continental		National		Total	
Club	Season	Division	Apps	Goals	Apps	Goals	Apps	Goals	Apps	Goals
Gazi Üniversitesispor	2007–2009	First League	14	4	–	–	7	0	21	4
Gazi Üniversitesispor	2009–10	First League	17	4	–	–	19	1	36	5
Gazi Üniversitesispor	2010–11	First League	21	14	–	–	11	1	32	15
Gazi Üniversitesispor	2011–12	First League	17	10	–	–	19	1	36	11
Gazi Üniversitesispor	Total		69	32	–	–	56	3	125	35
Konak Belediyespor	2012–13	First League	18	1	–	–	5	0	23	1
Konak Belediyespor	2013–14	First League	16	0	7	0	6	0	29	0
Konak Belediyespor	2014–15	First League	13	0	–	–	5	0	18	0
Konak Belediyespor	Total		47	1	7	0	16	0	70	1
Beşiktaş J.K.	2015–16	Second League	12	5	–	–	6	0	18	5
Beşiktaş J.K.	2016–17	First League	21	1	–	–	3	1	24	2
Beşiktaş J.K.	2017–18	First League	16	4	–	–	3	0	19	4
Beşiktaş J.K.	2018–19	First League	17	1	–	–	4	1	21	2
Beşiktaş J.K.	2019–20	First League	13	0	3	0	5	0	21	0
Beşiktaş J.K.	2020–21	First League	6	0	0	0	6	1	12	1
Beşiktaş J.K.	2021–22	Super League	20	2	2	0	11	0	33	2
Beşiktaş J.K.	2022–23	Super League	13	0	0	0	2	0	15	0
Beşiktaş J.K.	Total		118	13	5	0	40	2	163	15
Career total			234	46	12	0	112	6	358	52

== Honours ==
Turkish Women's First Football League

Gazi Üniversitesispor
Winners (3): 2006–07, 2007–08, 2009–10
Third places (1): 2008–09

Konak Belediyespor
Winners (3): 2012–13, 2013–14, 2014–15

Beşiktaş J.K.
Winners (2): 2018–19, 2020–21
Runners-up (2): 2016–17, 2017–18

Turkish Women's Second Football League

Beşiktaş J.K.
Runners-up (1): 2015–16
