= Semanur Akbaş =

Turkish footballer (born 1996)

Personal information
- Date of birth: January 1, 1996 (age 30)
- Place of birth: Osmangazi, Bursa, Turkey
- Position: Forward

Team information
- Current team: Komyaaltı GS
- Number: 9

Senior career*
Years	Team	Apps	(Gls)
2008–2011	Bursa Sağlıkgücü	24	(3)
2011–2014	Derince Belediyespor	45	(7)
2014–2015	1207 Antalyaspor	6	(4)
2016	Denizüstü Spor	4	(8)
2017	1Trabzon İdmanocağı	13	(2)
2018–	Konyaaltı GS	6	(9)
Total		98	(33)

International career^{‡}
2010	Turkey U-15	2	(0)
2012	Turkey U-17	6	(1)
2013–2014	Turkey U-19	28	(1)
- * Club domestic league appearances and goals as of April 24, 2018 ‡ National team caps and goals as of September 18, 2014

Semanur Akbaş (born January 1, 1996, in Osmangazi, Bursa, Turkey) is a Turkish women's football striker currently playing in the Turkish Women's Third Football League for Konyaaltı Gençlik ve Spor with jersey number 9.

== Playing career ==
=== Club ===
She received her license on May 30, 2008, for her hometown club Bursa Sağlıkgücü Gençlikspor. Akbaş played two seasons, capped 24 times and scored three goals for her team in the Turkish Women's Second Football League. In the 2011–12 season, she transferred to Derince Belediyespor. At the end of the season, she enjoyed her team's promotion to the Women's First League.

After withdrawal of Derince Belediyespor from the league, Akbaş moved to Second League team 1207 Antalya Muratpaşa Belediye spor for the 2014–15 season. At the end of the season, her team became league champion, and was promoted to the Women's First League again.

In the second half of the 2017–18 First league season, she moved to Konyaaltı Gençli ve Spor in Antalya to play in the Turkish Third League.

=== International ===
Semanur Akbaş appeared twice in the TurKey girls' national U-15 team and capped 6 times for the Turkey U-17 netting one goal. Currently, she is a member of the Turkey U-19 team.

She was called up to the Turkey women's U-21 team for the match against Belgium on November 26, 2014.

== Career statistics ==
As of match played April 12, 2018

Club	Season	League			Continental		National		Total	
Club	Season	Division	Apps	Goals	Apps	Goals	Apps	Goals	Apps	Goals
Bursa Sağlıkgücü Gençlikspor	2009–10	Second League	8	0	–	–	0	0	8	0
Bursa Sağlıkgücü Gençlikspor	2010–11	Second League	16	3	–	–	2	0	18	3
Bursa Sağlıkgücü Gençlikspor	Total		24	3	–	–	2	0	26	3
Derince Belediyespor	2011–12	Second League	9	5	–	–	2	1	11	6
Derince Belediyespor	2012–13	First League	18	1	–	–	9	1	27	2
Derince Belediyespor	2013–14	First League	18	1	–	–	17	0	35	1
Derince Belediyespor	Total		45	7	–	–	28	2	73	9
1207 Antalya Muratpaşa Belediye Spor	2014–15	Second League	6	4	–	–	6	0	12	4
1207 Antalya Muratpaşa Belediye Spor	Total		6	4	–	–	6	0	12	4
Denizüstü Spor	2016–17	Third League	4	8	–	–	0	0	4	8
Denizüstü Spor	Total		4	8	–	–	0	0	4	8
Trabzon İdmanocağı	2016–17	First League	10	2	–	–	0	0	10	2
Trabzon İdmanocağı	2017–18	First League	3	0	–	–	0	0	3	0
Trabzon İdmanocağı	Total		13	2	–	–	0	0	13	2
Konyaaltı GS	2017–18	Third League	6	9	–	–	0	0	6	9
Konyaaltı GS	Total		6	9	–	–	0	0	6	9
Career total			98	33	–	–	36	2	134	35

== Honours ==
Turkish Women's First League

Derince Belediyespor
Third places (1): 2013–14.

Turkish Women's Second League

1207 Antalya Muratpaşa Belediye Spor
Winners (1): 2014–15
