= Meryem Koç =

Turkish footballer (born 1996)

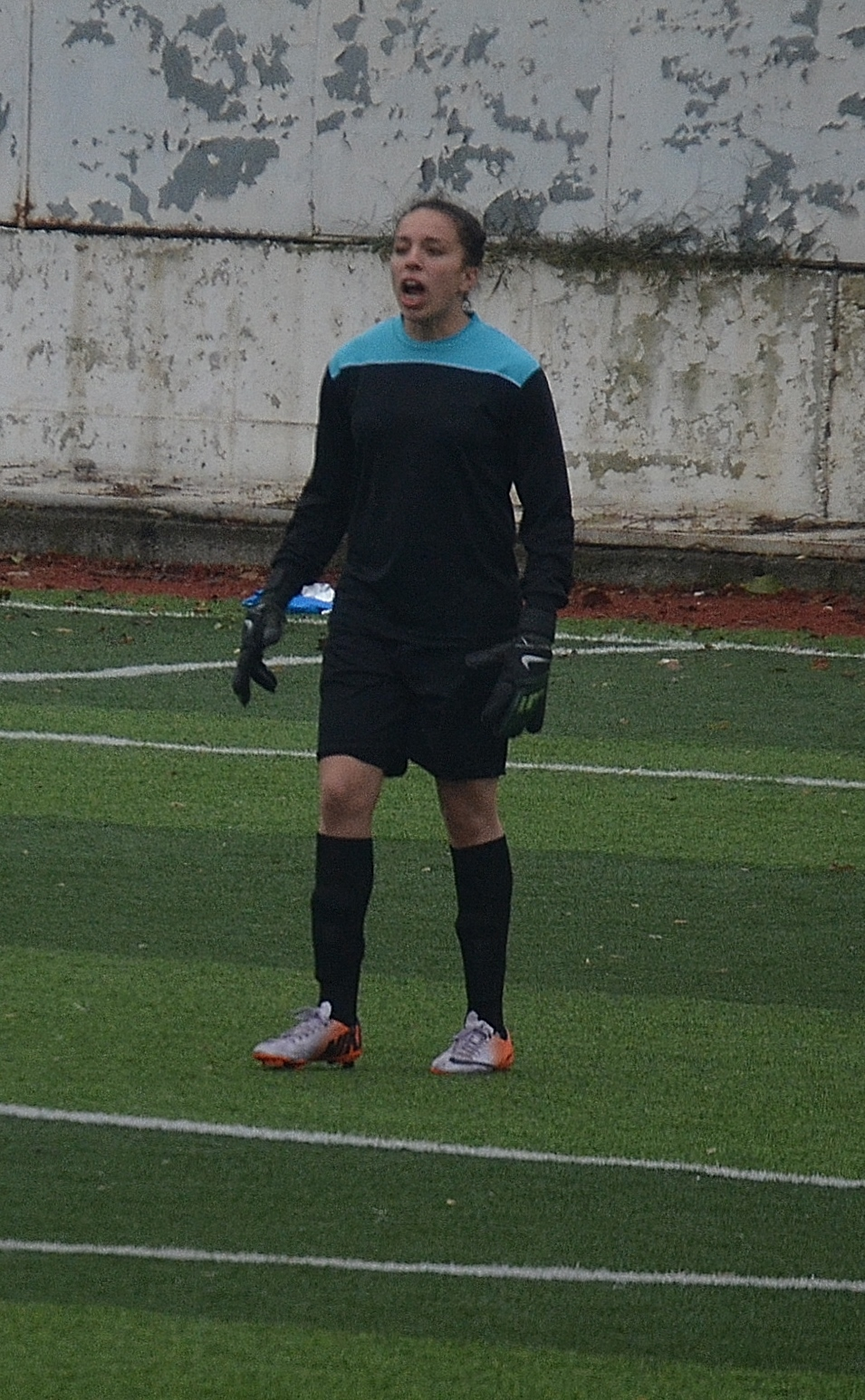
- Meryem Koç for Adana İdmanyurduspor (November 2014).

Personal information
- Date of birth: November 28, 1996 (age 29)
- Place of birth: Antakya, Turkey
- Position: Goalkeeper

Team information
- Current team: Ataşehir Belediyespor
- Number: 13

Senior career*
| Years | Team | Apps | (Gls) |
| 2010–2012 | Hatay Dumlupınarspor | 11 | (1) |
| 2012–2018 | Adana İdmanyurduspor | 49 | (0) |
| 2018– | Ataşehir Belediyespor | | |
| Total | | 60 | (1) |

International career^{‡}
| 2014–2015 | Turkey U-19 | 11 | (0) |
| 2015– | Turkey | 0 | (0) |
- * Club domestic league appearances and goals as of May 28, 2017 ‡ National team caps and goals as of April 11, 2015

Meryem Koç (born November 28, 1996) is a Turkish women's football goalkeeper currently playing in the Turkish Women's First Football League for Ataşehir Belediyespor with jersey number 13.

== Playing career ==
=== Club ===
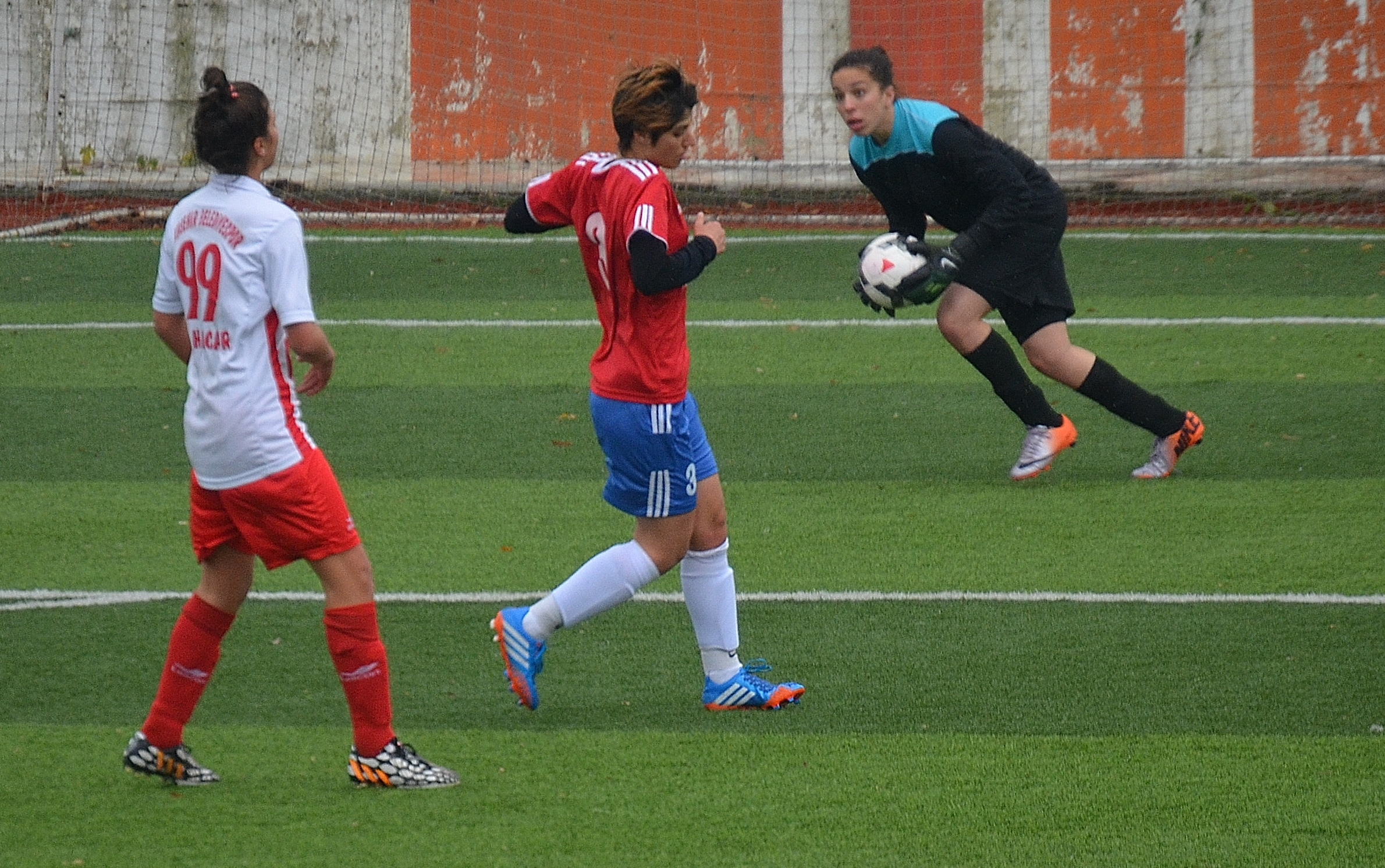
Meryem Koç for Adana İdmanyurduspor in the 2014–15 season's away match against Ataşehir Belediyespor.

Meryem Koç obtained her license on December 31, 2009, and started to play in the 2010–11 season as a forward for her hometown team Hatay Dumlupınarspor in the Women's Second League. After two seasons, she transferred on October 22, 2012, as goalkeeper to Adana İdmanyurduspor, which competes in the Women's First League.

On June 28, 2018, Koç signed with the Istanbul-based club Ataşehir Belediyespor before the club's participation at the 2018–19 UEFA Women's Champions League qualifying round. She played in one of the three matches of the qualification round.

=== International ===
In 2014, Meryem Koç was admitted to the Turkey women's national U-19 team, and debuted internationally in the friendly match against Belarus on June 11, 2014. She took part at the 2015 UEFA Women's Under-19 Championship qualification – Group 4 matches, and at the 2015 Elite round.

Meryem Koç was called up to the Turkey women's national team, and played at the UEFA Women's Euro 2017 qualifying Group 5 matches.

== Career statistics ==
As of August 13, 2018.

| Club | Season | League | | | Continental | | National | | Total | |
| Club | Season | Division | Apps | Goals | Apps | Goals | Apps | Goals | Apps | Goals |
|---|---|---|---|---|---|---|---|---|---|---|
| Hatay Dumlupınarspor | 2010–11 | Second League | 2 | 1 | – | – | 0 | 0 | 2 | 1 |
| Hatay Dumlupınarspor | 2011–12 | Second League | 9 | 0 | – | – | 0 | 0 | 9 | 0 |
| Hatay Dumlupınarspor | Total | | 11 | 1 | – | – | 0 | 0 | 11 | 1 |
| Adana İdmanyurduspor | 2012–13 | First League | 3 | 0 | – | – | 0 | 0 | 3 | 0 |
| Adana İdmanyurduspor | 2013–14 | First League | 10 | 0 | – | – | 1 | 0 | 11 | 0 |
| Adana İdmanyurduspor | 2014–15 | First League | 15 | 0 | – | – | 10 | 0 | 25 | 0 |
| Adana İdmanyurduspor | 2015–16 | First League | 12 | 0 | – | – | 0 | 0 | 12 | 0 |
| Adana İdmanyurduspor | 2016–17 | First League | 9 | 0 | – | – | 0 | 0 | 9 | 0 |
| Adana İdmanyurduspor | Total | | 49 | 0 | – | – | 11 | 0 | 60 | 0 |
| Ataşehir Belediyespor | 2018–19 | First League | | | 1 | 0 | | | 1 | 0 |
| Ataşehir Belediyespor | Total | | | | 1 | 0 | | | 1 | 0 |
| Career total | | | 60 | 1 | 1 | 0 | 11 | 0 | 72 | 1 |
