= Kübra Berber =

Turkish footballer (born 1996)

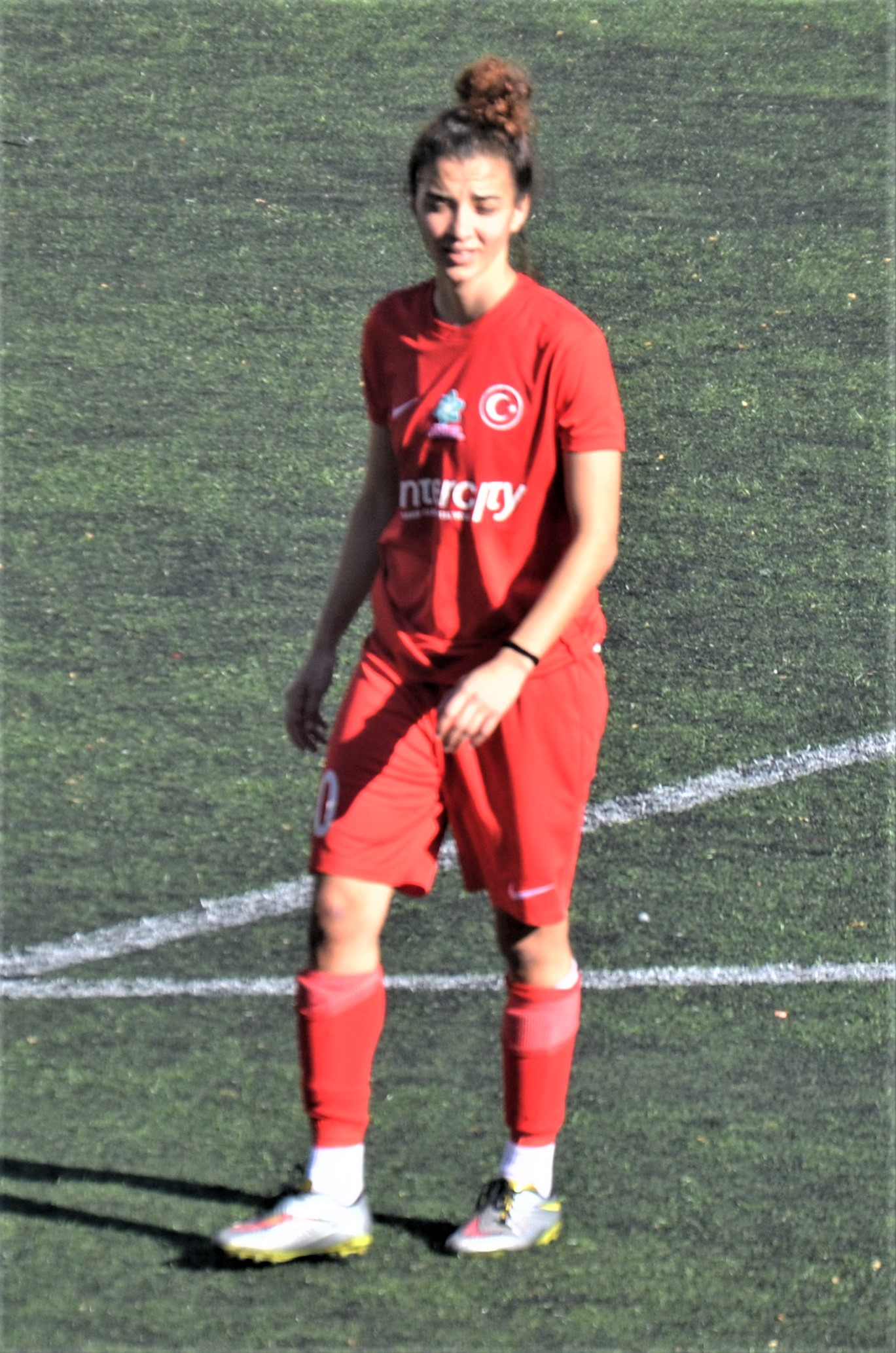
- Kübra Berber of Ataşehir Belediyespor (October 2018)

Personal information
- Date of birth: April 14, 1996 (age 30)
- Place of birth: Gölcük, Kocaeli, Turkey
- Position: Defender

Team information
- Current team: Ataşehir Belediyespor
- Number: 6

Senior career*
Years	Team	Apps	(Gls)
2008–2011	Gölcükspor	46	(2)
2011–2014	Derince Belediyespor	45	(7)
2014–2017	1207 Antalyaspor	57	(4)
2017–2018	Kireçburnu Spor	17	(2)
2018–	Ataşehir Belediyespor	10	(0)
Total		175	(15)

International career^{‡}
2010	Turkey U-15	2	(0)
2011–2013	Turkey U-17	11	(0)
2013	Turkey U-19	33	(0)
2014	Turkey U-21	1	(0)
- * Club domestic league appearances and goals as of February 23, 2019 ‡ National team caps and goals as of April 11, 2015

Kübra Berber (born April 14, 1996, in Gölcük, Kocaeli, Turkey) is a Turkish women's football defender currently playing in the First League for Ataşehir Belediyespor with jersey number 6. She is a member of the Turkish national U-19 team since 2013.

== Career ==
=== Club ===
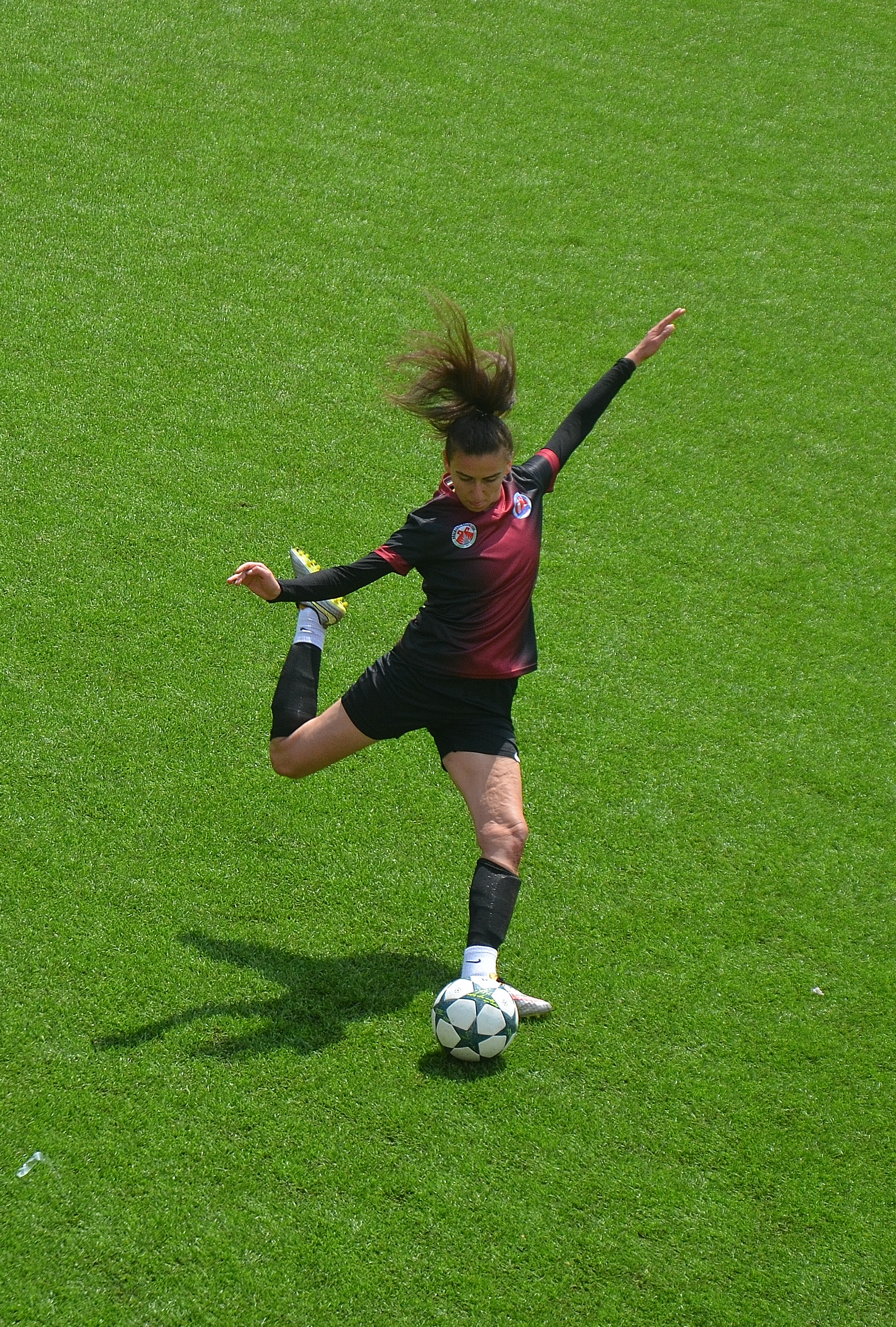
Kübra Berber playing for 1207 Antalya Döşemealtı Belediyespor in the 2016–17 season's play-off away match against Beşiktaş J.K.

She received her license on June 10, 2008, for her hometown club Gölcükspor. Berber played three seasons, capped 46 times and scored two goals for Gölcükspor in the Turkish Women's Second Football League. In the 2011–12 season, she transferred to Derince Belediyespor. At the end of the season, she enjoyed her team's promotion to the Women's First League.

She was transferred by the Second League-team 1207 Antalyaspor following her club's withdraw from the league in the 2014–15 season. She enjoyed league championship with 1207 Antalyaspor and promotion to the Women's First League.

In the 2018–19 league season, she transferred to Ataşehir Belediyespor.

=== International ===
Kübra Berber appeared twice in the TurKey girls' national U-15 team and capped 14 times for the Turkey U-17 before she was called up for the Turkey U-19.

On November 26, 2014, Berber debuted in the Turkey women's national under-21 football team playing in the friendly match against Belgium.

== Career statistics ==
As of match played February 23, 2019.

Club	Season	League			Continental		National		Total	
Club	Season	Division	Apps	Goals	Apps	Goals	Apps	Goals	Apps	Goals
Gölcükspor	2008–09	Second League	6	0	–	–	0	0	6	0
Gölcükspor	2009–10	Second League	18	1	–	–	0	0	18	1
Gölcükspor	2010–11	Second League	22	1	–	–	4	0	26	1
Gölcükspor	Total		46	2	–	–	4	0	50	2
Derince Belediyespor	2011–12	Second League	10	3	–	–	5	0	15	3
Derince Belediyespor	2012–13	First League	18	2	–	–	12	0	30	2
Derince Belediyespor	2013–14	First League	17	2	–	–	15	0	32	2
Derince Belediyespor	Total		45	7	–	–	32	0	77	7
1207 Antalyaspor	2014–15	Second League	21	3	–	–	11	0	32	3
1207 Antalyaspor	2015–16	First League	16	1	–	–	0	0	16	1
1207 Antalyaspor	2016–17	First League	20	0	–	–	0	0	20	0
1207 Antalyaspor	Total		57	4	–	–	11	0	68	4
Kireçburnu Spor	2017–18	First League	17	2	–	–	0	0	17	2
Kireçburnu Spor	Total		17	2	–	–	0	0	17	2
Ataşehir Belediyespor	2018–19	First League	10	0	–	–	0	0	10	0
Ataşehir Belediyespor	Total		10	0	–	–	0	0	10	0
Career total			175	15	–	–	47	0	222	15

== Honours ==
Turkish Women's First League

Derince Belediyespor
Third places (1): 2013–14.

Turkish Women's Second League

1207 Antalyaspor
Winners (1): 2014–15
