= Nihan Su =

Turkish footballer and manager (born 1981)

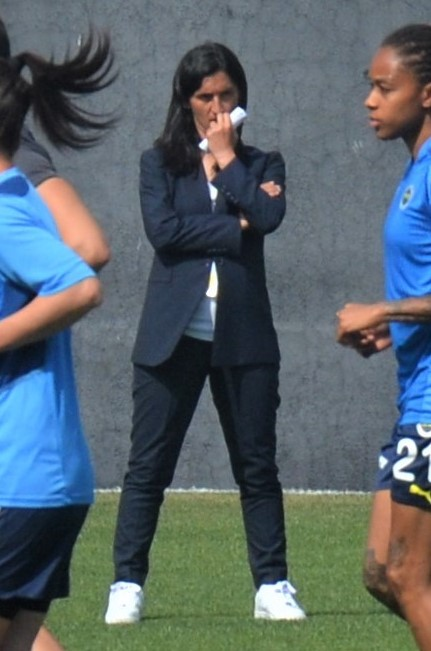
- Nihan Su, coach of Fenerbahçe (May 2022)

Personal information
- Date of birth: 22 August 1981 (age 45)
- Place of birth: Ankara, Turkey
- Position: Defender

Senior career*
Years	Team	Apps	(Gls)
1995–1997	Ankara BB Spor		
1997–1998	Bursa Delphi Packard		
1998–1999	Ankara Gürtaşspor		
1999–2006	Gazi Üniversitesispor		

International career
1997–1999	Turkey U-19	9	(0)
1999–2002	Turkey	17	(0)

Managerial career
- 2006: Gazi Üniversitesispor
- 2021–2022: Fenerbahçe
- * Club domestic league appearances and goals

Nihan Su (born 22 August 1981) is a Turkish retired footballer and football manager. She was a member of the Turkey U19 and Turkey national teams. She works as a university lecturer for physical education and sport.

== Personal life ==
Nihan Su was born in Ankara in 1981. She compşeted her primary and secondary education in her home town. She studied teacher of Sports and Physical Education at Gazi University, and graduated in 2002. She took a Master's degree in 22005.

She serves as a lecturer at the College of Sports and Physical Education at the Kocaeli University.

== Club playing career ==
Su started her football playing career in 1995. Between 1999 and 2003, she played in the clubs Ankara Metropoliten Municipality, Ankara Gürtaşspor, Bursa Delphi Packard and Gazi Üniversitesispor. In 2006, she retired form active playing.

== International playing career ==
She was a member of the Turkey U19 and Turkey national teams.

She participated at the UEFA Women's Under-18 Championship qualifyings in 1998 (2 matches), 1999 (2), 2000 First (2) and Second (3). For the Turkey women's national team, she played at the UEFA Women's Euro 2001 qualifying (3 matches), and the 2003 FIFA Women's World Cup qualification (UEFA) (7). At the 2005 Summer Universiade in İzmer, Turkey, she captained the Turkey national team.

== Managerial career ==
Su holds an UEFA coaching licence.

Gazi Üniversitesispor

Her managerial career began at Gazi Üniversitesispor.

=== Turkey women's national teams ===
From 2008 on, she worked at the Turkish Football Federation. She served as trainer of the Turkey U15, Turkey U17, Turkey U19 and the Turkey national teans between 2006 and 2014. She served as assistant trainer of the Turkey U17 (2010), Yutkey U19 (2019–2010) and the Turkey <(2011), as well as trainer of the Turkey U15 (2009–2010) and the Turkey (2008–2010, 2012). She managed the Turkey women's national deaf football team at the 2017 Summer Deaflympics held in Samsun, Turkey. In 2011, she became manager of the Turkey team.

=== Fenerbahçe ===
In 2021, she was appointed manager of the newly established Turkish Women's Football Super League club Fenerbahçe women's football team.

== Managerial statistics ==
As of 28 May 2022

Team	From	To	Record				
Team	From	To	G	W	D	L	Win %
Gazi Üniversitesispor
Gazi Üniversitesispor	2006	2007	12	9	2	1	75.00
Fenerbahçe
Fenerbahçe	2021	2022	26	20	3	3	76.92
Total			38	29	5	4	76.32
