= Selin Dişli =

German-born Turkish footballer

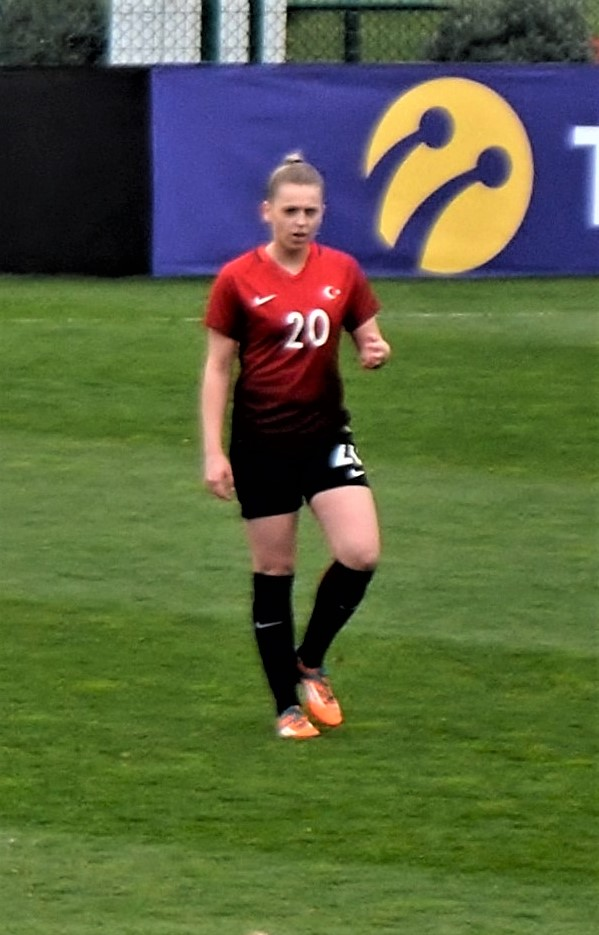
- Dişli playing for Turkey in 2018

Personal information
- Date of birth: 15 April 1998 (age 28)
- Place of birth: Viersen, North Rhine-Westphalia, Germany
- Position: Defender

Team information
- Current team: Bayer Leverkusen II
- Number: 10

Youth career
- 2013–2015: Bayer Leverkusen

Senior career*
Years	Team	Apps	(Gls)
2015–2016	Fortuna Köln	1	(0)
2016–2017	1. FC Köln II	4	(1)
2017–2018	Fortuna Köln	14	(0)
2018	Fortuna Köln II	2	(3)
2018–	Bayer Leverkusen II	26	(21)

International career^{‡}
2013–2014	Turkey U-17	8	(0)
2014–2016	Turkey U-19	21	(8)
2018–2019	Turkey	9	(1)
- * Club domestic league appearances and goals as of 8 December 2019 ‡ National team caps and goals as of 8 October 2019

Selin Dişli (born 15 April 1998) is a German-born Turkish footballer who plays as a defender for Regionalliga West club Bayer 04 Leverkusen II and the Turkey national team.

== Early life ==
Selin Dişli was born to Turkish immigrant parents in Viersen, North Rhine-Westphalia, Germany on 15 April 1998. Her father Süleyman Dişli is a native of Çaltılı village of Of district in Trabzon Province, northeastern Turkey. Her one-year older sister Aylin is also footballer in Germany and a national team member for Turkey.

== Playing career ==
=== Club ===
Dişli played football already during her school years at St. Wolfhelm Gymnasium in Schwalmtal, Viersen. She so took part in her school's U-13 team. She began her football career entering the juniors team of Bayer 04 Leverkusen. Between 2013 and 2015, she played two seasons in the "B-Juniorinnen-Bundesliga West/Südwest" capping 22 times and scoring seven goals. For the 2015–16 season, she was transferred by SC Fortuna Köln to play in the German Women's Regionalliga West, the third-tier of German women's football. After appearing in only one match, she moved the next season to 1. FC Köln II, where she capped four times and netted one goal. For the 2017–18 season, Dişli returned to her former club SC Fortuna Köln.

=== International ===
Dişli was admitted to the Turkey U-17 team debuting in the International Juniors Tournament held in Belgrad, Serbia on 22 June 2013. She played in three matches of the 2014 UEFA Under-17 European Championship qualification - Group 4 held in Russia. She capped eight times for the national U-17 team.

Dişli became a member of the Turkey U-19 team playing for the first time in the friendly match against Azerbaijan on 22 February 2014. She took part at the 2014 Kuban Spring Tournament, 2014 UEFA Championship Second qualifying round – Group 5, 2014 UEFA Under-19 Development Tournament, 2015 UEFA Under-19 European Championship qualification - Group 4. She was part of the team, which became champion of the 2016 UEFA Under-19 Development Tournament . Dişli capped in 21 games scoring eight goals in total.

Dişli was promoted to the Turkey national team. In her first participation in the national team, she remained seated on the reserve bank in the UEFA European Championship 2017 qualifying Group 5 match against Germany on 8 April 2016. Also in her next participation at the friendly match against Jordan on 27 November 2017, she came not in action.

International goals (Friendly matches not included)
Date	Venue	Opponent	Result	Competition	Scored
Turkey women's U-19
29 March 2014	Sputnik Sport Center, Sochi, Russia	Azerbaijan	W 2-0	Kuban Spring Tournament	1
1 August 2014	Zimbru Stadium, Chișinău, Moldova	Romania	W 7-0	2014 UEFA Women's Under-19 Development Tournament	2
18 September 2014	İnegöl Stadium, Bursa, Turkey	Kazakhstan	W 6-1	2015 UEFA Women's Under-19 Championship qualification - Group 4	1
9 June 2016	Football Center FRF, Buftea, Romania	Slovenia	W 8-0	2016 UEFA Women's Under-19 Development Tournament	2
10 June 2016	Mogoșoaia National Football Center, Mogoșoaia, Romania	Romania	W 8-1	2016 UEFA Women's Under-19 Development Tournament	2

== Honours ==
=== International ===
UEFA Development Tournament

Turkey women's U-19
Winners (1): 2016
