= Turkey women's national under-19 football team =

National association football team

Turkey U19
- Association: Turkish Football Federation
- Confederation: UEFA (Europe)
- Head coach: Begüm Üresin
- Most caps: Başak Ersoy (47); As of 10 April 2014
- Top scorer: Ebru Topçu (21); As of 4 April 2015
- FIFA code: TUR
First colours	Second colours

First international
- Turkey 0–8 Russia (Holon, Israel; November 17, 1997)

Biggest win
- Turkey 13–0 Georgia (Buca, Turkey; September 24, 2009)

Biggest defeat
- Turkey 0–11 England (Drogheda, Ireland; November 20, 2000)

The Turkey women's national under-19 football team (Turkish: Türkiye 19 Yaş Altı Kadın Millî Futbol Takımı) is the national under-19 football team of Turkey and is governed by the Turkish Football Federation.

== Current squad ==
As of 10 October 2022

Head coach: (Turkey) Begüm Üresin

No.	Pos.	Player	Date of birth (age)	Caps	Goals	Club
1	GK	İlayda Açelya İçier	October 23, 2004 (aged 17)	4	0	(German Football Association) KSV Hessen Kassel
12	GK	Aylin Nur Yıldırım	August 16, 2006 (aged 16)	0	0	(Swiss Football Association) Grasshopper Club Zürich
2	DF	Beyza Semercioğlu	April 9, 2004 (aged 18)	11	1	(Turkish Football Federation) Ankara BB Fomget GS
3	DF	İlayda Cansu Kara	April 28, 2005 (aged 17)	5	1	(Turkish Football Federation) Fenerbahçe S.K.
4	DF	Yuna Joelle Demir	July 13, 2005 (aged 17)	5	0	(German Football Association) SV Hegnach
5	DF	Lorin-Hiva Beyaztepe	November 23, 2005 (aged 16)	5	0	(German Football Association) FC Viktoria 1889 Berlin
7	DF	Julia Gökçe Torsell Oğuz	June 21, 2005 (aged 17)	5	0	(Swedish Football Association) Jitex Mölndal BK
13	DF	Sıla Besra Tetik	November 3, 2005 (aged 16)	0	0	(Turkish Football Federation) Konak belediyespor
14	DF	Sıla Selin Marz	September 30, 2004 (aged 18)	8	0	(German Football Association) TuS 05 Oberpleis
15	DF	Aliya Türker	March 31, 2005 (aged 17)	3	0	(German Football Association) FC Internationale Berlin 1980
6	MF	Berfin Elif Ceylan	June 16, 2005 (aged 17)	5	0	(Turkish Football Federation) Konak Belediyespor
8	MF	Zeynep Ülkü Kahya	January 27, 2004 (aged 18)	6	0	(Turkish Football Federation) Fenerbahçe S.K.
10	MF	Rojin Polat	August 20, 2004 (aged 18)	5	0	(Football Australia) SD Raiders FC
11	MF	Tülin Kuyucak	August 30, 2004 (aged 18)	10	2	(Royal Dutch Football Association) FC Eindhoven
16	MF	Hümeyra Şanver	December 14, 2004 (aged 17)	4	0	(Turkish Football Federation) Dudullu Spor
17	MF	Lina Aicha Medine Titiz	August 6, 2005 (aged 17)	5	0	(French Football Federation) AS Saint-Priest
18	MF	Yaren Sürül	January 1, 2005 (aged 17)	5	0	(German Football Association) Bayer 04 Leverkusen
19	MF	Zeynep Ece Güneş	October 23, 2004 (aged 17)	2	0	(Turkish Football Federation) Galatasaray S.K.
9	FW	Mine Yıldız	June 28, 2005 (aged 17)	4	0	(Turkish Football Federation) Pendik Çamlık Spor
20	FW	Clara Ceren Büyükdağ	January 2, 2005 (aged 17)	5	0	(German Football Association) Hannover 96 II

== Achievements ==
=== UEFA Women's U19 Championship record ===
1998-2001:U18 / Since 2002: U19

UEFA Women's U19 Championship									UEFA Women's U19 Championship Qualification					
Year	Round	Rank	M	W	D	L	GF	GA	M	W	D	L	GF	GA
(Denmark) (France) 1998	Did Not Qualify								2	0	0	2	2	11
(Sweden) 1999	Did Not Qualify								2	0	1	1	2	10
(France) 2000	Did Not Qualify								5	2	0	3	16	14
(Norway) 2001	Did Not Qualify								6	3	0	3	13	26
(Sweden) 2002	Did Not Qualify								6	2	1	3	4	14
(Germany) 2003	Did Not Qualify								3	0	0	3	0	8
(Finland) 2004	Did Not Qualify								3	1	0	2	3	6
(Hungary) 2005	Did Not Participate								Declined Participation					
(Switzerland) 2006	Did Not Participate								Declined Participation					
(Iceland) 2007	Did Not Qualify								3	0	1	2	2	8
(France) 2008	Did Not Qualify								3	1	0	2	7	10
(Belarus) 2009	Did Not Qualify								3	0	1	2	4	12
(North Macedonia) 2010	Did Not Qualify								6	1	1	4	17	15
(Italy) 2011	Did Not Qualify								6	2	1	3	7	8
(Turkey) 2012	Group stage	5th	3	0	2	1	1	2	Qualified As Hosts					
(Wales) 2013	Did Not Qualify								3	1	0	2	2	4
(Norway) 2014	Did Not Qualify								6	2	1	3	7	11
(Israel) 2015	Did Not Qualify								6	1	2	3	9	11
(Slovakia) 2016	Did Not Qualify								3	1	0	2	1	5
(Northern Ireland) 2017	Did Not Qualify								6	2	1	3	6	11
(Switzerland) 2018	Did Not Qualify								6	2	2	2	10	11
(Scotland) 2019	Did Not Qualify								6	2	0	4	5	17
(Georgia (country)) ~~2020~~	Cancelled								3	0	1	2	2	10
(Belarus) ~~2021~~	Cancelled								Not Held					
(Czech Republic) 2022	Did Not Qualify								6	2	0	4	13	19
(Belgium) 2023	Did Not Qualify								6	3	0	3	10	9
(Lithuania) 2024	Did Not Qualify								5	1	1	3	8	14
(Poland) 2025	Did Not Qualify								5	1	1	3	2	20
(Bosnia and Herzegovina) 2026	Did Not Qualify								TBD					
Total	Best: Group stage	1/25	3	0	2	1	1	2	112	30	17	65	153	286

== Results and fixtures ==
- The following is a list of match results in the last 12 months, as well as any future matches that have been scheduled.
- Friendly matches are not included.

Win Draw Lose Fixtures

== Individual records ==
=== Most capped players ===
Players in bold are still active. As of 11 April 2015

#	Name	Career	Caps	Goals
1	Başak Ersoy	2006–2010	47	9
2	Ebru Topçu	2012–2015	42	21
3	Eylül Elgalp	2004–2010	38	16
4	Arzu Karabulut	2006–2010	35	6
4	Yaşam Göksu	2012–2014	35	5
6	Zübeyde Kaya	2007–2010	34	0
7	Kübra Berber	2012–2015	33	0
8	Fatma Kara	2007–2010	32	19
8	Didem Karagenç	2009–2012	32	1
8	Gizem Gönültaş	2009–2012	32	1

=== Top goalscorers ===
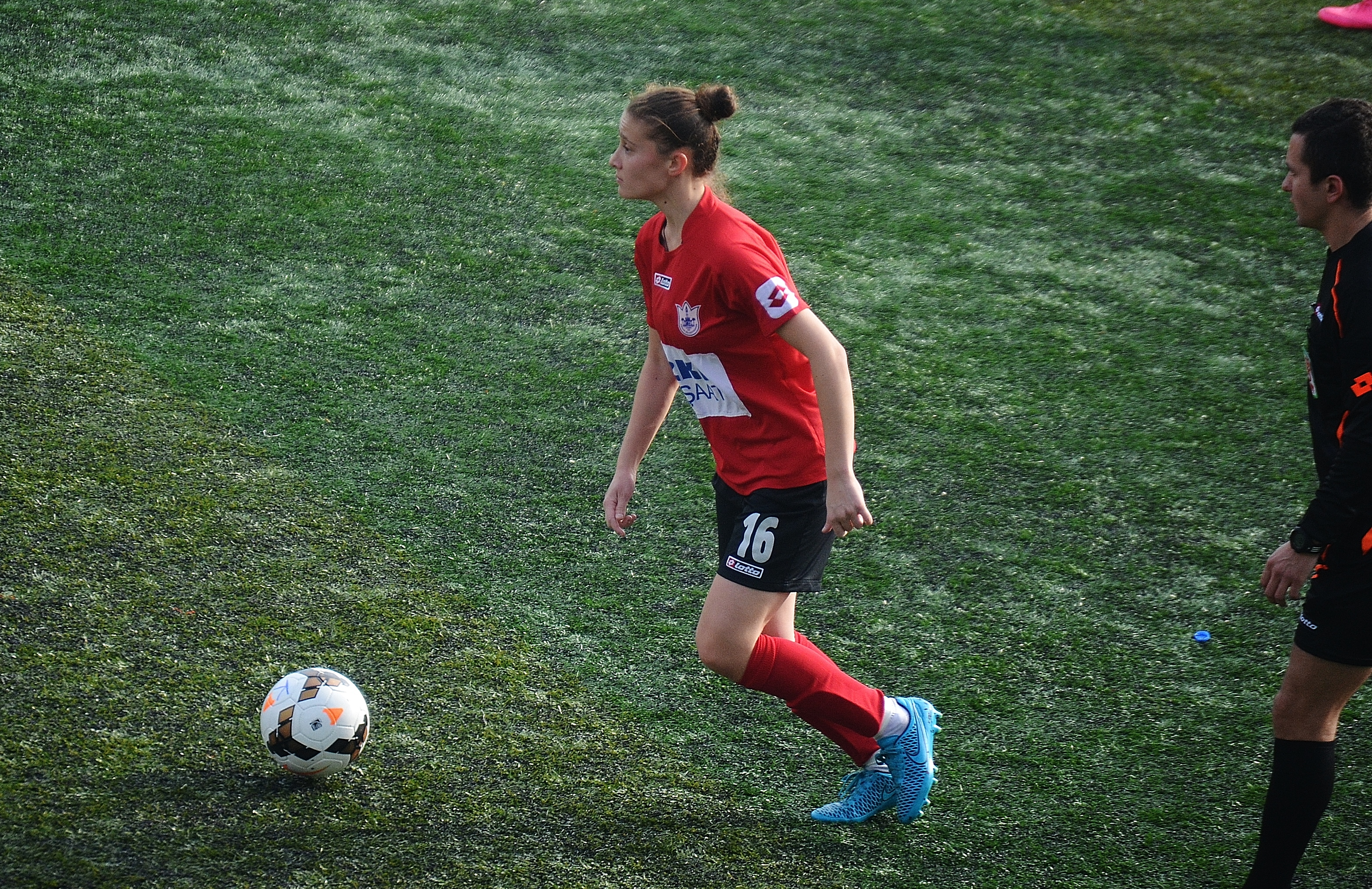
Ebru Topçu playing for Konak Belediyespor in the 2015-16 Turkish Women's First Football League.

Goalscorers with an equal number of goals are ranked in chronological order of reaching the milestone. Bold indicates still active players. As of 10 April 2017

#	Name	Career	Goals	Caps	Rate
1	Ebru Topçu	2012–2015	21	42	0.50
2	Fatma Kara	2007–2010	19	32	0.59
3	Eylül Elgalp	2004–2010	16	38	0.42
4	Başak Ersoy	2006–2010	9	47	0.19
4	Filiz İşikırık	2012	9	12	0.75
6	Selin Dişli	2014–2016	8	21	0.38
6	İlayda Civelek	2015–2017	8	17	0.47
8	Seda Tosun	1998–2000	7	9	0.78
8	Aylin Yaren	2003–2006	7	10	0.70
8	Sevgi Çınar	2011–2012	7	25	0.28
8	Leyla Güngör	2010–2012	7	11	0.64

== Notable former players ==
- Güzide Alçu (2014)
- Hasret Altındere (1998)

Goalkeepers

- Selda Akgöz (2010–2012)
- Ezgi Çağlar (2007–2010)
- Nurcan Çelik (1997–1998)
- Sude Mihri Çınar (2013–2014)
- Özlem Gezer (2008–2010)
- Meryem Koç (2014–2015)
- İrem Damla Şahin (2018–2019)
- Gamze Nur Yaman (2016–2018)
- Duygu Yılmaz (2006–2007)

Defenders

- Şevval Alpavut (2014–2017)
- Feride Bakır (2010)
- Çiğdem Belci (2003)
- Kübra Berber (2012–2015)
- Demet Bozkurt (2015)
- Serra Çağan (2013–2015)
- Sevinç Çorlu (2008)
- Emine Demir (2011–2012)
- Selin Dişli (2014–2016)
- Sibel Duman (2008)
- Medine Erkan (2013–2014)
- Esra Erol (2001–2003)
- Yaşam Göksu (2012–2014)
- Leyla Güngör (2013–2014)
- Bahar Güvenç (2013–2015)
- Didem Karagenç (2009–2012)
- Zübeyde Kaya (2007–2010)
- Beyza Kocatürk (2014–2015)
- Serenay Öziri (2012)
- Aslı Canan Sabırlı (2006–2010)
- Nihan Su (1997–1999)
- Esra Sibel Tezkan (2010–2012)
- Berna Yeniçeri (2012–2015)

Midfielders

- Derya Arhan (2015–2018)
- Aybüke Arslan (2010–2012)
- Remziye Bakır (2014–2015)
- Hilal Başkol (2012–2013)
- İlayda Civelek (2015–2017)
- Ecem Cumert (2016)
- Hanife Demiryol (2009–2010)
- Elif Deniz (2010–2012)
- Azize Erdoğan (2013–2015)
- Melisa Ertürk (2010–2012)
- Emine Ecem Esen (2011–2012)
- Buse Güngör (2010–2012)
- Başak İçinözbebek (2012)
- Fatma Kara (2007–2010)
- Arzu Karabulut (2006–2010)
- Tuğba Karataş (2009)
- Bilge Su Koyun (2016–2018)
- Esra Özkan (2013–2014)
- Selin Sivrikaya (2013–2015)
- Dilara Türk (2015)
- Ece Türkoğlu (2014–2016)
- Cansu Yağ (2006–2008)
- Aylin Yaren (2006–2007)

Forwards

- Semanur Akbaş (2013–2014)
- Zelal Baturay (2013–2015)
- Eylül Elgalp (2006–2010)
- Emine Gümüş (2010)
- Zeynep Koçer (2015–2017)
- Özge Özel (2006–2009)
- Hatice Bahar Özgüvenç (2000–2002)
- Ebru Topçu (2012–2015)
- Yağmur Uraz (2006–2008)
- Aycan Yanaç (2015)

== Managers ==
As of 110 October 2022

Manager	Years	G	W	D	L	Win %
Unknown	1997-2001	27	9	3	15	33.33
Şükrü Ersoy	2002	3	0	0	3	0.00
Emin Kızılay	2003	7	1	0	6	14.29
Ali Kızılet	2006	9	4	2	3	44.44
Fethi Demircan	2006	3	0	0	3	0.00
Özay Atmaca	2007–2008	14	7	1	6	50.00
Hamdi Aslan	2009–2010	26	10	5	11	38.46
Nur Mustafa Gülen	2011	8	3	0	5	37.50
Taygun Erdem	2012	12	7	2	3	58.33
Ogün Temizkanoğlu	2012	5	1	2	2	20.00
Nur Mustafa Gülen	2013	7	3	1	3	42.86
Talat Tuncel	2013–2014	27	15	4	8	55.56
Suat Okyar	2015–2019	53	18	9	26	33.96
Begüm Ğresin	2021–2022	13	4	1	8	30.77
Total	2006-2022	214	82	30	102	38.32

== See also ==
- Women's football in Turkey
- Turkey women's national football team
- Turkey women's national under-21 football team
- Turkey women's national under-17 football team
