= Feride Bakır =

Turkish-German footballer (born 1992)

Personal information
- Date of birth: June 26, 1992 (age 34)
- Place of birth: Bonn, Germany
- Position: Defender

Youth career
- –2008: Blau-Weiß Friesdorf

Senior career*
Years	Team	Apps	(Gls)
2008–2010	Bad Neuenahr	21	(0)
2010–2013	Bayer 04 Leverkusen	34	(2)
Total		55	(2)

International career^{‡}
2010	Turkey U-19	6	(0)
2009–2011	Turkey	13	(0)
- * Club domestic league appearances and goals as of May 3, 2015 ‡ National team caps and goals as of February 26, 2015

Feride Bakır (born June 26, 1992) is a Turkish-German female football defender, who played in the German top women's league lately for Bayer 04 Leverkusen until 2013. She was part of the Turkey women's national football team.

Bakır was born in Bonn, Germany on June 26, 1992. In July 2014, she completed an education in sports graduating from the "Elite School of Sports Leverkusen", a vocational boarding school in Leverkusen consisting of sports classes of the Landrat-Lucas-Gymnasium.

== Playing career ==
=== Club ===
In May 2006, she took part as a member of SV Siegburg 04 at a qualification tournament for girls' under-15 organized by Western German Football and Athletics Association (German: Westdeutsche Fußball- und Leichtathletikverband; WFLV) in Hennef, and played for the selection of Middle Rhine team.

Feride Bakır began her football career at Blau-Weiß Friesdorf. In 2008, she moved to SC 07 Bad Neuenahr. On March 29, 2009, she debuted in the Women's Bundesliga, the top level of the German women's football league system, at the home game against Hamburger SV. In the 2009–10 season, she was a regular player.

In the 2010–11 season, she was transferred by the Bundesliga rival Bayer 04 Leverkusen. On October 31, 2010, Bakır scored her first goal in the Bundesliga in the match against her former club, bringing her team to an intermediate lead with 1–0 in the match. After playing all the years in the midfielder position, she became a defender in the 2012–13 season. At the end of the 2012–13 season, she left Bayer 04 Leverkusen. She capped forty times in three seasons and scored three goals, including cups.

=== International ===
Feride Bakır was admitted to the Turkey women's U-19 team playing in the 2010 UEFA Women's U-19 Championship Second qualifying round – Group 1 match against Sweden on March 27, 2010. She took part also at the 2011 UEFA Women's U-19 Championship First qualifying round – Group 9 matches. She capped six times in total for the Turkey women's U-19 team.

Bakır was called up to the Turkey women's national football team before she appeared for the Turkey women's U-19 team. She played for the first time at the 2011 FIFA Women's World Cup qualification – UEFA Group 5 match against Spain on November 21, 2009. She participated at the 2011 FIFA Women's World Cup qualification – UEFA Group 5, and UEFA Women's Euro 2013 qualifying – Group 2 matches for Turkey. She capped thirteen times between 2009 and 2011.

== Career statistics ==
As of June 30, 2013

Club	Season	League			Cup		International		Total	
Club	Season	Division	Apps	Goals	Apps	Goals	Apps	Goals	Apps	Goals
SC 07 Bad Neuenahr	2008–09	Allianz Frauen-Bundesliga	6	0	0	0	0	0	6	0
SC 07 Bad Neuenahr	2009–10	Allianz Frauen-Bundesliga	15	0	0	0	6	0	21	0
SC 07 Bad Neuenahr	Total		21	0	0	0	6	0	27	0
Bayer 04 Leverkusen	2010–11	Allianz Frauen-Bundesliga	18	2	4	1	8	0	30	3
Bayer 04 Leverkusen	2011–12	Allianz Frauen-Bundesliga	10	0	1	0	5	0	16	0
Bayer 04 Leverkusen	2012–13	Allianz Frauen-Bundesliga	6	0	1	0	0	0	7	0
Bayer 04 Leverkusen	Total		34	2	6	1	13	0	53	3
Career total			55	2	6	1	19	0	80	3
