= 2010–11 Turkish Women's First Football League =

Turkish Women's First Football League
- Season: 2010–11
- Champions: Ataşehir Belediyespor
- Relegated: Marmara Üniversitesi Spor; Yalıspor
- All statistics correct as of 26 April 2017.

The 2010–11 season of the Turkish Women's First Football League is the 15th season of Turkey's premier women's football league. Ataşehir Belediyespor is the champion of the season.

== Teams ==
Location of teams in the 2010–11 season of Turkish Women's First Football League

Season 2010–11
Team	Hometown	Ground	Capacity	2009/10 finish
Adana İdmanyurduspor	Adana			
Antalyaspor	Antalya			
Ataşehir Belediyespor	Istanbul			
Bucaspor	İzmir			
Düvenciler Lisesispor	Lüleburgaz			
Gazi Üniversitesispor	Ankara			
Gölcükspor	Gölcük			
Konak Belediyespor	İzmir			
Marmara Üniversitesi Spor	Istanbul			
Trabzon İdmanocağı	Trabzon			
Trabzonspor	Trabzon			
Yalıspor	Istanbul			

== Season ==
=== Table ===
Pos	Team	Pld	W	D	L	GF	GA	GD	Pts	Qualification or relegation
1	Ataşehir Belediyespor (C)	22	18	3	1	85	7	+78	57	Qualification to Champions League qualifying round
2	Konak Belediyespor	22	14	5	3	68	19	+49	47	
3	Adana İdmanyurduspor	22	15	1	6	73	34	+39	46	
4	Düvenciler Lisesispor	22	14	2	6	79	18	+61	44	
5	Trabzonspor	22	13	4	5	81	32	+49	43	
6	Gölcükspor	22	11	3	8	62	46	+16	36	
7	Gazi Üniversitesispor	22	10	3	9	58	49	+9	33	
8	Trabzon İdmanocağı	22	6	5	11	32	43	−11	23	
9	Bucaspor	22	6	1	15	36	63	−27	19	
10	Antalyaspor	21	4	2	15	17	97	−80	14	
11	Marmara Üniversitesi Spor	21	2	5	14	17	81	−64	11	Relegation to Second Football League
12	Yalıspor	22	1	0	21	9	128	−119	3	Relegation to Second Football League

Updated to match(es) played on 19 April 2017. Source: Kadınlar 1. Ligi 2010 - 2011 Sezonu
Rules for classification: 1) Points
(C) Champions

=== Results ===
Home \ Away	AIY	ANT	ATB	BUC	DUV	GAZ	GOL	KOB	MAR	TIO	TS	YAL
Adana İdmanyurduspor	—	13–0	0–2	3–1	4–3	4–4	1–0	0–3	4–1	4–2	3–4	3–0
Antalyaspor	0–3	—	0–13	2–3	1–0	3–3	1–7	0–6	1–1	1–3	3–2	2–1
Ataşehir Belediyespor	3–0	2–0	—	5–1	1–0	1–0	4–0	3–0	8–1	2–0	0–0	16–0
Bucaspor	2–5	5–1	0–0	—	0–5	2–1	0–3	0–4	4–1	1–3	1–2	7–0
Düvenciler Lisesispor	2–0	6–0	0–1	4–0	—	2–0	2–1	1–1	4–0	4–0	2–2	16–0
Gazi Üniversitesispor	2–5	7–0	1–6	4–1	3–1	—	3–3	1–3	2–0	4–2	3–2	7–0
Gölcükspor	2–6	3–1	3–1	3–2	3–5	3–2	—	1–2	9–0	3–3	2–1	3–0
Konak Belediyespor	2–1	7–0	0–1	5–0	0–2	1–0	2–1	—	5–0	2–2	3–2	7–1
Marmara Üniversitesi Spor	1–5	1–0	0–4	3–1	0–11	0–3	1–1	1–1	—	1–1	2–3	2–1
Trabzon İdmanocağı	0–2	4–0	0–2	3–1	0–2	1–2	1–3	0–0	0–0	—	0–4	4–0
Trabzonspor	0–2	8–0	1–1	6–2	1–0	9–2	8–1	2–2	10–0	4–1	—	6–1
Yalıspor	0–5	0–1	0–9	0–2	0–7	0–4	0–7	0–12	3–2	1–2	1–4	—

Updated to match(es) played on 21 April 2017. Source: Kadınlar 1. Ligi 2010 - 2011 Sezonu
Legend: Blue = home team win; Yellow = draw; Red = away team win.

== Topscorers ==
Rank	Player	Club	Goals
1	(Turkey) Sevgi Çınar	Adana İdmanyurdu	26
2	(Turkey) Gamze İskeçeli	Konak Belediyespor	24
3	(Turkey) Eylül Elgalp	Trabzonspor	23
4	(Turkey) Esra Erol	Düvenciler Lisesispor	21
5	(Turkey) Yağmur Uraz	Ataşehir Belediyespor	20
6	(Brazil) Jaqueline Gonçalves Nogueira	Adana İdmanyurdu	19
6	(Georgia (country)) Khatia Tchkonia	Trabzon İdmanocağı	19
6	(Georgia (country)) Tatiana Matveeva	Trabzonspor	19
9	(Turkey) Reyhan Şeker	Ataşehir Belediyespor	17
10	(Turkey) Cansu Yağ	Trabzonspor	15
10	(Turkey) Filiz İşikırık	Gölcükspor	15
10	(Turkey) Tuğba Karataş	Gazi Üniversitesi	15
13	(Turkey) Didem Karagenç	Gazi Üniversitesispor	14
13	(Turkey) Lütfiye Ercimen	Ataşehir Belediyespor	14
15	(Turkey) Gülbin Hız	Gölcükspor	11
15	(Turkey) Hanife Demiryol	Bucaspor	11
15	(Turkey) İlgim Bizan	Düvenciler Lisesipor	11
18	(Turkey) Fatma Serdar	Ataşehir Belediyespor	10
18	(Turkey) Hatice Bahar Özgüvenç	Düvenciler Lisesipor	10
18	(Turkey) Tuğçe Günoğlu	Gazi Üniversitesipor	10
