= Lüleburgaz 39 Spor =

- Full name: Lüleburgaz 39 Spor
- Founded: 2007; 18 years ago
- Ground: Lüleburgaz 8 November Stadium
- League: Turkish Women's Second Football League
Home colours

Lüleburgaz 39 Spor is a Turkish women's football club based in Lüleburgaz town and district of Kırklareli Province. It was established in 2007. Currently, the club chairman is Cenk Güngör.

The club was founded as a high school girls' team, the Lüleburgaz Düvenciler Lisesi Spor, with the initiatives of Ali Kızılet, then the coach of the Turkey women's U-19 national team, and Nihat Güder, teacher of physical education and director of the high school, who had played football and was a coach also.

The team made its league debut in the 2007–08 season, lost, however, all the 8 league matches by scoring only 6 goals against 158. They were so relegated one level downwards. The next season in the Second League, the team reached the play-offs, however, lost in the finals to the league's second best team, Adana İdmanyurdu. Düvenciler Lisesi transferred eight players to strengthen the squad, and finished the 2009–10 season unbeaten champion but with one draw only. The women footballers from Lüleburgaz scored a total of 126 goals. They were so promoted to the highest women's league, the Women's First League. In the 2010–11 season, the team placed fourth, the best rank they achieved so far.

In 2011, the team changed its name to Lüleburgaz 39 Spor, and the club colors from yellow-black to red-green, the colors of the local sports club, Lülebyrgazspor.

Due to financial problems, the club management notified the Turkish Football Federation in August 2013 that they concluded not to participate in the league in the 2013–14 season.
