= 2009–10 Turkish Women's First Football League =

Turkish Women's First Football League
- Season: 2009–10
- Champions: Gazi Üniversitesispor
- Relegated: Mersin Camspor; Kartalspor
- All statistics correct as of 16 May 2017.

The 2009–10 season of the Turkish Women's First Football League is the 14th season of Turkey's premier women's football league. Gazi Üniversitesispor is the champion of the season.

== Season ==
=== Table ===
Pos	Team	Pld	W	D	L	GF	GA	GD	Pts	Qualification or relegation
1	Gazi Üniversitesispor (C)	18	16	2	0	105	8	+97	50	Qualification to Champions League
2	Trabzonspor	18	15	0	3	63	14	+49	45	
3	Konak Belediyespor	18	12	0	6	51	30	+21	36	
4	Ataşehir Belediyespor	18	11	3	4	43	32	+11	36	
5	Bucaspor	18	10	2	6	54	36	+18	32	
6	Adana İdmanyurduspor	18	7	2	9	32	36	−4	23	
7	Antalyaspor	18	4	2	12	22	79	−57	14	
8	Marmara Üniversitesi Spor	18	3	1	14	17	74	−57	10	
9	Mersin Camspor	18	2	2	14	17	57	−40	8	Relegation to Second Football League
10	Kartalspor (Note: Deducted 3 points)	18	3	0	15	27	65	−38	6	Relegation to Second Football League

Updated to match(es) played on 16 May 2017. Source: Kadınlar 1. Ligi 2009 - 2010 Sezonu
Rules for classification: 1) Points
(C) Champions

=== Results ===
Home \ Away	AIY	ANT	ATB	BUC	GAZ	KAR	KOB	MAR	MCS	TS
Adana İdmanyurduspor	—	7–1		2–2	0–7	4–1	1–3	4–1	5–1	1–0
Antalyaspor	1–3	—	2–1	2–4	1–11	2–1	0–6	1–2	1–0	1–7
Ataşehir Belediyespor	1–0	1–0	—	3–3	0–0	4–1	3–4	4–1	3–2	1–4
Bucaspor	2–0	5–0	1–3	—	2–6	2–0	3–2	2–1	7–0	1–2
Gazi Üniversitesispor	5–0	11–0	2–2	3–0	—	12–0	5–0	8–0		1–0
Kartalspor	0–3	4–5	2–3	1–7	1–4	—	1–3	5–2	4–0	1–3
Konak Belediyespor	4–0	4–2	1–2	2–1	1–2	4–1	—	3–0	6–1	1–3
Marmara Üniversitesi Spor	1–0	1–1	0–5	2–7	0–12	0–3	3–4	—	1–0	1–6
Mersin Camspor	0–0	2–2	3–4	2–4	0–6	4–1	0–2	2–0	—	0–1
Trabzonspor	3–1	9–0	5–0	5–1	1–2		2–1	7–1	2–0	—

Updated to match(es) played on 17 May 2017. Source: Kadınlar 1. Ligi 2009 - 2010 Sezonu
Legend: Blue = home team win; Yellow = draw; Red = away team win.
