= 2008–09 Turkish Women's First Football League =

Turkish Women's First Football League
- Season: 2008–09
- Champions: Trabzonspor
- Relegated: Yalıspor; Zeytinburnuspor
- All statistics correct as of 20 May 2017.

The 2008–09 season of the Turkish Women's First Football League is the 13th season of Turkey's premier women's football league. Trabzonspor is the champion of the season.

== Season ==
=== Table ===
Pos	Team	Pld	W	D	L	GF	GA	GD	Pts	Qualification or relegation
1	Trabzonspor (C)	18	15	0	3	41	14	+27	45	Qualification to Champions League
2	Bucaspor	18	13	1	4	67	21	+46	40	
3	Gazi Üniversitesispor	18	13	1	4	73	23	+50	40	
4	Sakarya Yenikent Güneşspor	18	12	3	3	50	19	+31	39	
5	Mersingücü Cengiz Topelspor	18	9	3	6	45	20	+25	30	
6	Konak Belediyespor	18	6	3	9	32	28	+4	21	
7	Kartalspor (Note: Deducted 3 points)	18	7	0	11	47	46	+1	18	
8	Mersin Camspor	18	5	3	10	36	40	−4	18	
9	Yalıspor	18	2	0	16	21	68	−47	6	Relegation to Second Football League
10	Zeytinburnuspor	18	1	0	17	8	141	−133	3	Relegation to Second Football League

Updated to match(es) played on 16 May 2017. Source: Kadınlar 1. Ligi 2009 - 2010 Sezonu
Rules for classification: 1) Points
(C) Champions

=== Results ===
Home \ Away	BUC	GAZ	KAR	KOB	MCS	MCT	SYG	TS	YAL	ZEY
Bucaspor	—	3–1	3–2	2–0	3–1	1–0	2–1	2–0	8–1	9–0
Gazi Üniversitesispor	2–1	—	7–0	3–0	5–0	4–3	2–1	1–2		16–0
Kartalspor	1–3	1–3	—	4–3	2–1	3–0	1–2	1–2	4–2	
Konak Belediyespor				—						
Mersin Camspor					—					
Mersingücü Cengiz Topelspor						—				
Sakarya Yenikent Güneşspor							—			
Trabzonspor								—		
Yalıspor									—	
Zeytinburnuspor										—

Updated to match(es) played on 21 May 2017. Source: Kadınlar 1. Ligi 2008 - 2009 Sezonu
Legend: Blue = home team win; Yellow = draw; Red = away team win.
