= 2013–14 Turkish Women's First Football League =

Turkish Women's First Football League
- Season: 2013–14
- Champions: Konak Belediyespor
- Relegated: Marmara Üniversitesi Spor; İzmit Çenesuyu Plajyoluspor
- Matches: 67
- Goals: 253 (3.78 per match)
- All statistics correct as of 8 April 2017.

The 2013–14 season of the Turkish Women's First Football League is the 18th season of Turkey's premier women's football league. Konak Belediyespor is the champion of the season

== Teams ==
Location of teams in the 2013–14 season of Turkish Women's First Football League

Season 2013–14
Team	Hometown	2012–13
Adana İdmanyurduspor	Adana	8th
Ataşehir Belediyespor	Istanbul	2nd
Derince Belediyespor	Derince	6th
İzmit Çenesuyu Plajyoluspor	İzmit	1st, 2nd League
Kdz. Ereğlispor	Karadeniz Ereğli	3rd
Konak Belediyespor	İzmir	1st
Marmara Üniversitesi Spor	Istanbul	2nd, 2nd League
Trabzon İdmanocağı	Trabzon	4th

Before the start of the season, Lüleburgaz 39 Spor and Çamlıcaspor notified the Turkish Football Federation that they concluded not to participate in the league in the 2013–14 season.

== Standings ==
=== First stage ===
Pos	Team	Pld	W	D	L	GF	GA	GD	Pts	Qualification or relegation
1	Konak Belediyespor	14	12	2	0	57	9	+48	38	Championship group
2	Ataşehir Belediyespor	14	11	2	1	50	13	+37	35	Championship group
3	Derince Belediyespor	14	7	2	5	19	19	0	23	Championship group
4	Kdz. Ereğlispor	14	7	1	6	27	17	+10	22	Championship group
5	Adana İdmanyurduspor	14	6	4	4	27	26	+1	22	
6	Trabzon İdmanocağı	14	5	0	9	18	35	−17	15	
7	Marmara Üniversitesi Spor	13	1	1	11	11	51	−40	4	Relegation to Second Football League
8	İzmit Çenesuyu Plajyoluspor	13	0	0	13	0	39	−39	0	Relegation to Second Football League

Updated to match(es) played on 8 April 2017. Source: Kadinlar 1. Ligi 2013-2014 Sezonu Fikstur ve Puan Cetveli TFF
Rules for classification: 1) Points

==== Results ====
Home \ Away	AIY	ATB	DER	ICP	KDZ	KOB	MAR	TIO
Adana İdmanyurduspor	—	2–2	2–1	3–0	1–3	0–0	8–3	2–1
Ataşehir Belediyespor	5–1	—	5–0	3–0	3–0	1–3	6–1	5–1
Derince Belediyespor	1–1	0–2	—	3–0	1–0	1–4	2–0	3–1
İzmit Çenesuyu Plajyoluspor	0–3	0–3	0–3	—	0–3	0–3	NP	0–3
Kdz. Ereğlispor	2–1	2–3	0–0	3–0	—	2–3	3–0	3–0
Konak Belediyespor	6–0	2–2	4–0	3–0	3–1	—	7–0	7–0
Marmara Üniversitesi Spor	1–1	1–5	0–3	3–0	0–4	1–7	—	0–1
Trabzon İdmanocağı	1–2	0–5	0–1	3–0	2–1	1–5	4–1	—

Updated to match(es) played on 8 April 2017. Source: Kadınlar 1. Ligi 2013 - 2014 Sezonu
Legend: Blue = home team win; Yellow = draw; Red = away team win.

=== Championship group ===
Team	Pld	W	D	L	GF	GA	GD	Pts	Qualification
Konak Belediyespor (C)	20	16	4	0	73	15	58	52	Qualification to 2014–15 Champions League
Ataşehir Belediyespor	20	14	4	2	65	23	42	46	
Derince Belediyespor	20	8	3	9	26	32	-6	27	
Kdz. Ereğlispor	20	8	2	10	33	32	1	26	

==== Results ====
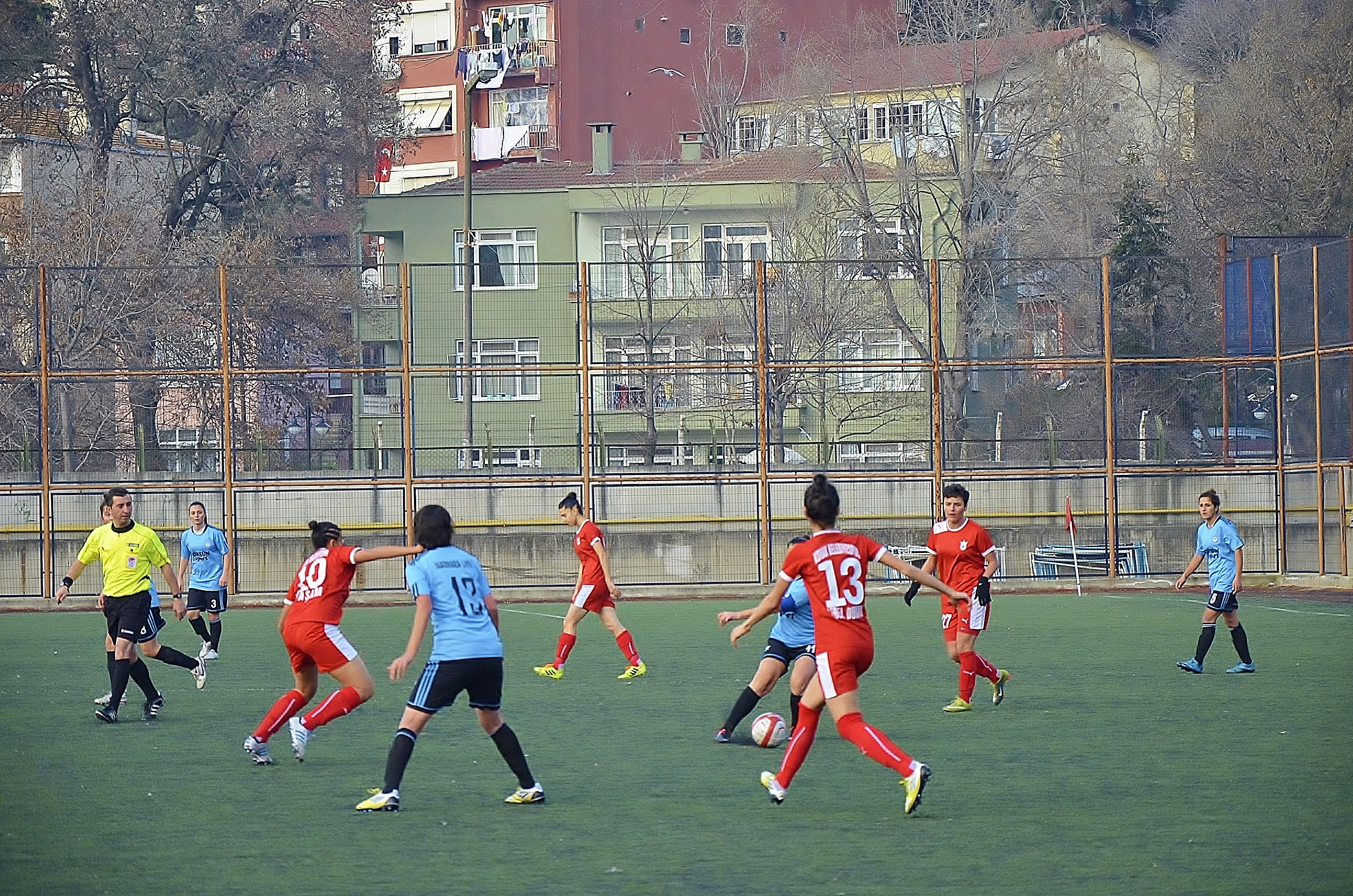
2013–14 season's match between Marmara Üniversitesi Spor and Konak Belediyespor.

Home \ Away	ATB	DER	KDZ	KOB
Ataşehir Belediyespor	—	5–1	5–1	2–2
Derince Belediyespor	1–1	—	0–1	2–3
Kdz. Ereğlispor	1–2	1–3	—	1–1
Konak Belediyespor	4–0	2–0	4–1	—

Updated to match(es) played on 08 April 2017. Source: Kadınlar 1. Ligi 2013 – 2014 Sezonu
Legend: Blue = home team win; Yellow = draw; Red = away team win.
