= Gazi Üniversitesispor =

- Full name: Gazi Üniversitesispor
- Founded: November 20, 1999; 26 years ago
- Ground: Gazi University Stadium
- League: Turkish Women's Football Premier League
- 2006–07; 2007–08; 2008–09; 2009–10: 1st; 1st; 3rd; 1st
Home colours	Away colours

Gazi Üniversitesispor is a women's football club from Ankara, Turkey. It is the team of the Gazi University and played in Turkey's top level league, the Turkish Women's Football Premier League.

== History ==
The club was founded in the 1999–2000 season at Gazi University in Ankara with female students, who attended football courses in physical education and sports programs. The team played already in that season in the Turkish Women's Football League.

Gazi Üniversitesispor became Turkish Women's First Football League champion in the seasons 2006–07, 2007–08 and 2009–10.

Although they qualified for the UEFA Women's Cup after their championship titles, they did not attend those. They did, however, compete in the 2010–11 UEFA Women's Champions League, where they played three games in the qualifying round, losing 2 and drawing against Moldovan Roma Calfa.

== Stadium ==
Gazi Üniversitesispor play their home matches at Gazi University Stadium situated within the university's campus in Ankara.

== Statistics ==
Season	League	Rank	Pld	W	D	L	GF	GA	GD	Pts
2006–07	Women's League Div. B	1	12	8	3	1	69	12	+57	27
2007–08	Women's League Div. 3	1	12	12	0	0	77	7	+70	36
2008–09	Women's First League	3	18	13	1	4	73	23	+50	40
2009–10	Women's First League	1	18	16	2	0	105	8	+97	50
2010–11	Women's First League	7	22	10	3	9	58	49	+9	33
2011–12	Women's First League	6	20	6	2	12	33	57	−24	20
Green marks a season followed by promotion, red a season followed by relegation.

== International results ==
Event	Stage	Date	Venue	Opponent	Result	Scorers
2010–11 UEFA Champions League	QR; Group 1; 4th	Aug 5, 2010	Denmark, Brøndby	(Bulgaria) FC NSA Sofia	L 0–7	
2010–11 UEFA Champions League	QR; Group 1; 4th	Aug 7, 2010	Denmark, Brøndby	(Denmark) Brøndby IF	L 0–12	
2010–11 UEFA Champions League	QR; Group 1; 4th	Aug 10, 2010	Denmark, Brøndby	(Moldova) FC Roma Calfa	D 3–3	Karagenç (2), Başkaya

=== Ranking history ===
Season	Rank	Points	Ref.
2010–11	90 ▲	0.995	
2011–12	100 ▼	1.160	
2012–13	96 ▲	1.490	
2013–14	90 ▲	3.800	
2014–15	87 ▲	4.130	

== Achievements ==
- Turkish Women's Football Premier League
  - Winners (3): 2007, 2008, 2010
  - Runners-up (1): 2003
  - Third Place (2): 2002, 2009

== See also ==
- Turkish women in sports
