= 2012–13 Turkish Women's First Football League =

Turkish Women's First Football League
- Season: 2012–13
- Champions: Konak Belediyespor
- Relegated: Fomget Gençlik ve Spor; Eskişehirspor
- Matches: 90
- Goals: 373 (4.14 per match)
- All statistics correct as of 9 April 2017.

The 2012–13 season of the Turkish Women's First Football League is the 17th season of Turkey's premier women's football league. Konak Belediyespor is the champion of the season

== Teams ==
Location of teams in the 2012–13 season of Turkish Women's First Football League

Season 2012–13
Team	Hometown	2011–12
Adana İdmanyurduspor	Adana	8th
Ataşehir Belediyespor	Istanbul	1st
Çamlıcaspor	Istanbul	9th
Derince Belediyespor	Derince	Promote to 1st League
Eskişehirspor	Eskişehir	Promote to 1st League
Fomget Gençlik ve Spor	Ankara	10th
Kdz. Ereğlispor	Karadeniz Ereğli	2nd
Konak Belediyespor	İzmir	5th
Lüleburgaz 39 Spor	Lüleburgaz	4th
Trabzon İdmanocağı	Trabzon	3rd

== League table ==
Pos	Team	Pld	W	D	L	GF	GA	GD	Pts	Qualification or relegation
1	Konak Belediyespor (C)	18	17	0	1	72	8	+64	51	Qualification to Champions League qualifying round
2	Ataşehir Belediyespor	18	14	1	3	75	22	+53	43	
3	Kdz. Ereğlispor	18	12	1	5	39	27	+12	37	
4	Trabzon İdmanocağı	18	11	2	5	46	19	+27	35	
5	Lüleburgaz 39 Spor	18	8	4	6	31	34	−3	28	
6	Derince Belediyespor	18	7	3	8	37	35	+2	24	
7	Çamlıcaspor	18	5	1	12	26	41	−15	16	
8	Adana İdmanyurduspor	18	4	2	12	24	43	−19	14	
9	Fomget Gençlik ve Spor	18	3	3	12	13	51	−38	12	Relegation to Second Football League
10	Eskişehirspor	18	0	1	17	10	93	−83	1	Relegation to Second Football League

Updated to match(es) played on 9 April 2017. Source: Kadinlar 1. Ligi 2012-2013 Sezonu Fikstur ve Puan Cetveli TFF
Rules for classification: 1) Points
(C) Champions

== Results ==
Home \ Away	AIY	ATB	CAM	DER	ESK	FOM	KDZ	KOB	LBZ	TIO
Adana İdmanyurduspor	—	2–4	3–2	1–1	3–0	0–0	1–2	0–3	0–2	1–2
Ataşehir Belediyespor	5–1	—	3–1	5–4	6–0	8–0	2–3	4–2	3–1	0–1
Çamlıcaspor	0–2	0–5	—	0–3	5–0	3–0	1–2	0–4	3–3	0–2
Derince Belediyespor	6–3	1–5	1–0	—	3–1	3–0	2–4	1–5	1–1	2–1
Eskişehirspor	1–3	0–10	2–7	0–5	—	1–1	0–2	1–11	1–2	1–8
Fomget Gençlik ve Spor	1–0	0–6	0–2	1–0	6–1	—	1–2	0–10	0–2	1–3
Kdz. Ereğlispor	2–1	1–1	1–2	4–2	5–0	3–0	—	0–4	3–1	1–0
Konak Belediyespor	4–0	3–1	2–0	1–0	7–0	2–0	2–0	—	3–1	2–0
Lüleburgaz 39 Spor	4–2	1–5	2–0	2–1	4–0	1–1	3–2	0–5	—	1–1
Trabzon İdmanocağı	4–1	1–2	6–0	1–1	5–1	4–1	4–2	0–2	3–0	—

Updated to match(es) played on 10 April 2017. Source: Kadınlar 1. Ligi 2012 - 2013 Sezonu
Legend: Blue = home team win; Yellow = draw; Red = away team win.
