= Medine Erkan =

Turkish women's football defender (born 1995)

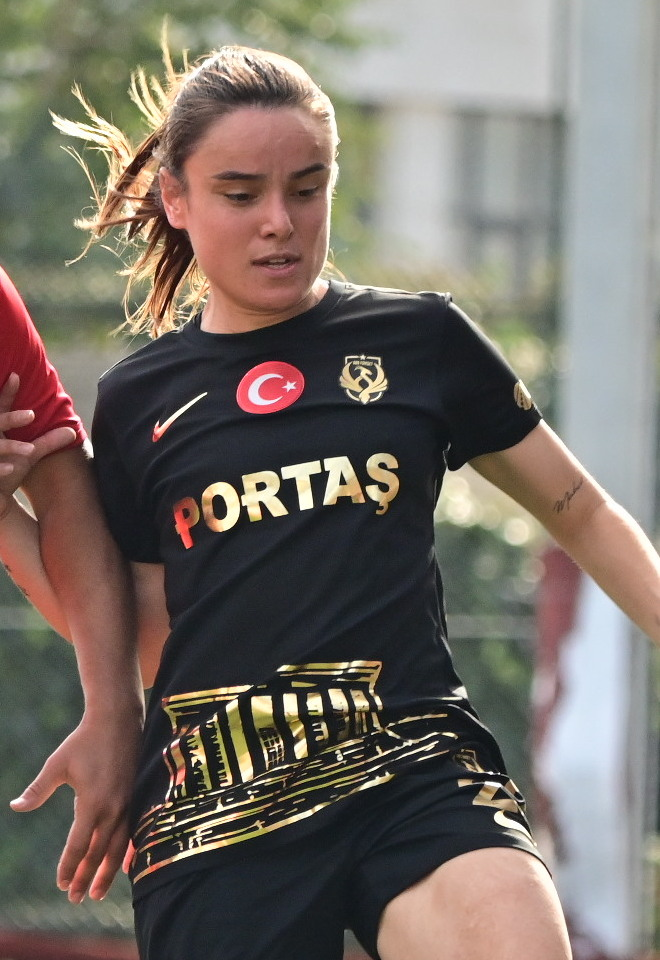
- Medine Erkan in the 2023–24 season.

Personal information
- Date of birth: 10 September 1995 (age 31)
- Place of birth: Eskişehir, Turkey
- Position: Defender

Team information
- Current team: Ankara BB Fomget
- Number: 22

Senior career*
Years	Team	Apps	(Gls)
2010–2013	Eskişehirspor	49	(15)
2013–2014	Derince	17	(2)
2014–2016	Ataşehir	40	(1)
2018–2019	Kocaeli	28	(13)
2019–2022	ALG	32	(3)
2023–	Ankara BB Fomget	44	(0)

International career^{‡}
2010	Turkey U-15	2	(0)
2012–2014	Turkey U-19	26	(0)
2016–	Turkey	16	(0)
- * Club domestic league appearances and goals as of 4 May 2025 ‡ National team caps and goals as of 30 November 2021

Medine Erkan (born 10 September 1995) is a Turkish women's football defender who plays in the Turkish Women's Super League for Ankara BB Fomget with jersey number 22. She plays for the Turkish women's national team.

== Club career ==
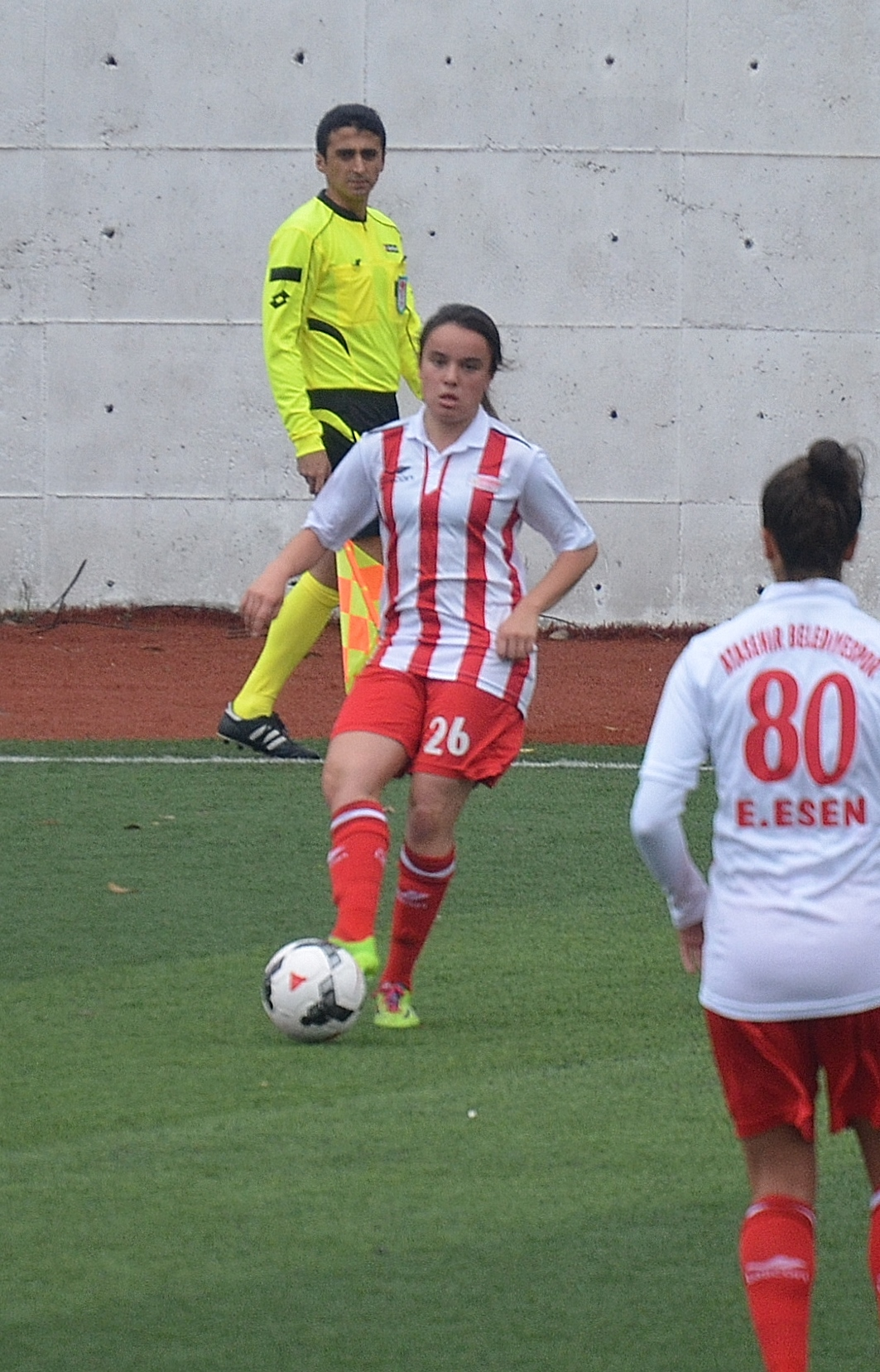
Medine Erkan for Ataşehir Belediyespor (2014–15 season).

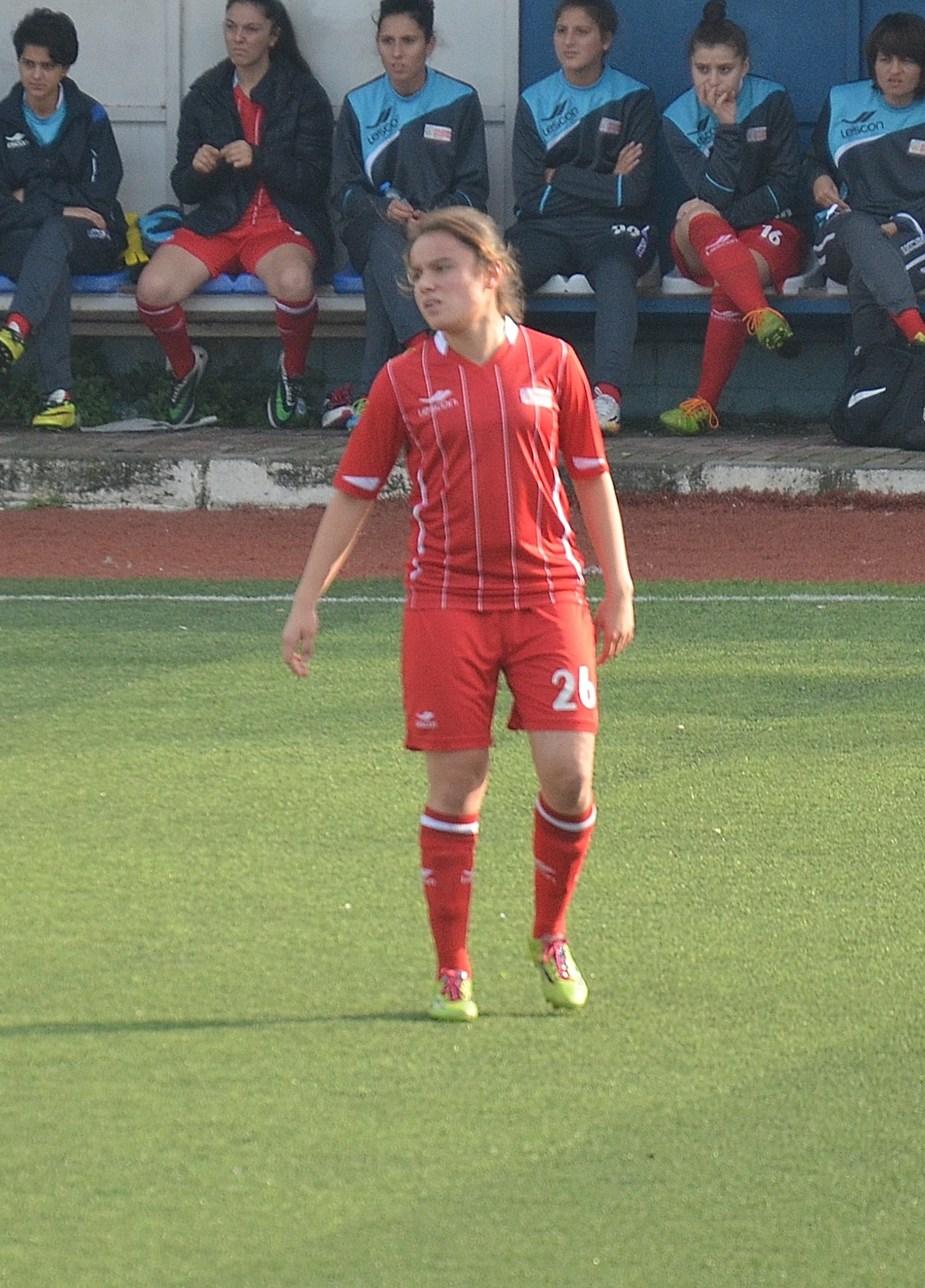
Medine Erkan playing for Ataşehir Belediyespor in the 2014–15 season.

Medine Erkan received her license on February 9, 2010, for her hometown club Eskişehirspor, where she played four seasons in the Regional League, Women's Second League and finally Women's First League. In the 2013–14 season, she transferred to Derince Belediyespor. After one season, Derince Belediyespor withdrew from the league, and Erkan moved to play with Ataşehir Belediyespor in the 2014–15 season.

By end September 2019, she transferred to ALG Spor in Gaziantep. She enjoyed the 2021–22 Women's Super League champion title of her team.

End August 2023, Erkan moved to Ankara BB Fomget. In that season, she became runners-up, and she won the champions title in the 2024–25 season.

== International career ==
Medine Erkan was admitted to the Turkey U-15, and debuted in the 2010 summer Youth Olympics held in Singapore, and capped four time.

On September 26, 2012, Erkan played for the first time at the Turkey U-19 appearing in the friendly match against Wales. She played in the 2013 UEFA Women's U-19 Championship First qualifying round – Group 5, 2013 Kuban Spring Tournament, 2014 UEFA Women's Under-19 Championship qualification – Group 10, 2014 Kuban Spring Tournament and 2014 UEFA Women's Under-19 Championship qualification – Group 5 matches. She capped 32 times for the women's national U-19 team.

Erkan was admitted to the national team and played in three matches of the UEFA Women's Euro 2017 qualifying Group 5.

== Career statistics ==
As of match played on 4 May 2025

Club	Season	League			Continental		National		Total	
Club	Season	Division	Apps	Goals	Apps	Goals	Apps	Goals	Apps	Goals
Eskişehirspor	2009–10	Regional League	10	0	–	–	2	0	12	0
Eskişehirspor	2010–11	Regional League	10	1	–	–	0	0	10	1
Eskişehirspor	2011–12	Second League	11	8	–	–	0	0	11	8
Eskişehirspor	2012–13	First League	18	6	–	–	10	0	28	6
Eskişehirspor	Total		49	15	–	–	12	0	61	15
Derince	2013–14	First League	17	2	–	–	16	0	33	2
Ataşehir	2014–15	First League	17	1	–	–	0	0	17	1
Ataşehir	2015–16	First League	17	0	–	–	3	0	20	0
Ataşehir	2016–17	First League	6	0	–	–	0	0	6	0
Ataşehir	Total		40	1	–	–	3	0	43	1
Kocaeli	2017–18	Third League	8	4	–	–	0	0	8	4
Kocaeli	2018–19	Second League	20	9	–	–	5	0	25	9
Kocaeli	Total		28	13	–	–	5	0	33	13
ALG	2019–20	First League	10	1	–	–	6	0	16	1
ALG	2020–21	First League	6	0	–	–	1	0	7	0
ALG	2021–22	Super League	16	2	–	–	1	0	17	2
ALG	Total		32	3	–	–	8	0	40	3
Ankara BB Fomget	2023–24	Super League	26	0	–	–	0	0	26	0
Ankara BB Fomget	2024–25	Super League	18	0	–	–	0	0	18	0
Ankara BB Fomget	Total		44	0	–	–	0	0	44	0
Career total			210	34	–	–	44	0	256	34

== Honours ==
Turkish Women's Super League

Ankara BB Fomget
Champions (1): 2024–25
Runners-up (1): 2023–24

Turkish Women's First League

Ataşehir
Runners-up (2): 2014–15, 2015–16
Third places (1): 2016–17

ALG
Winners (2): 2019–20, 2021–22
Third places (1): 2020–21

Turkish Women's Second League

Kocaeli
Third places (1): 2018–19
