= Esra Solmaz =

Turkish women's football striker (born 1995)

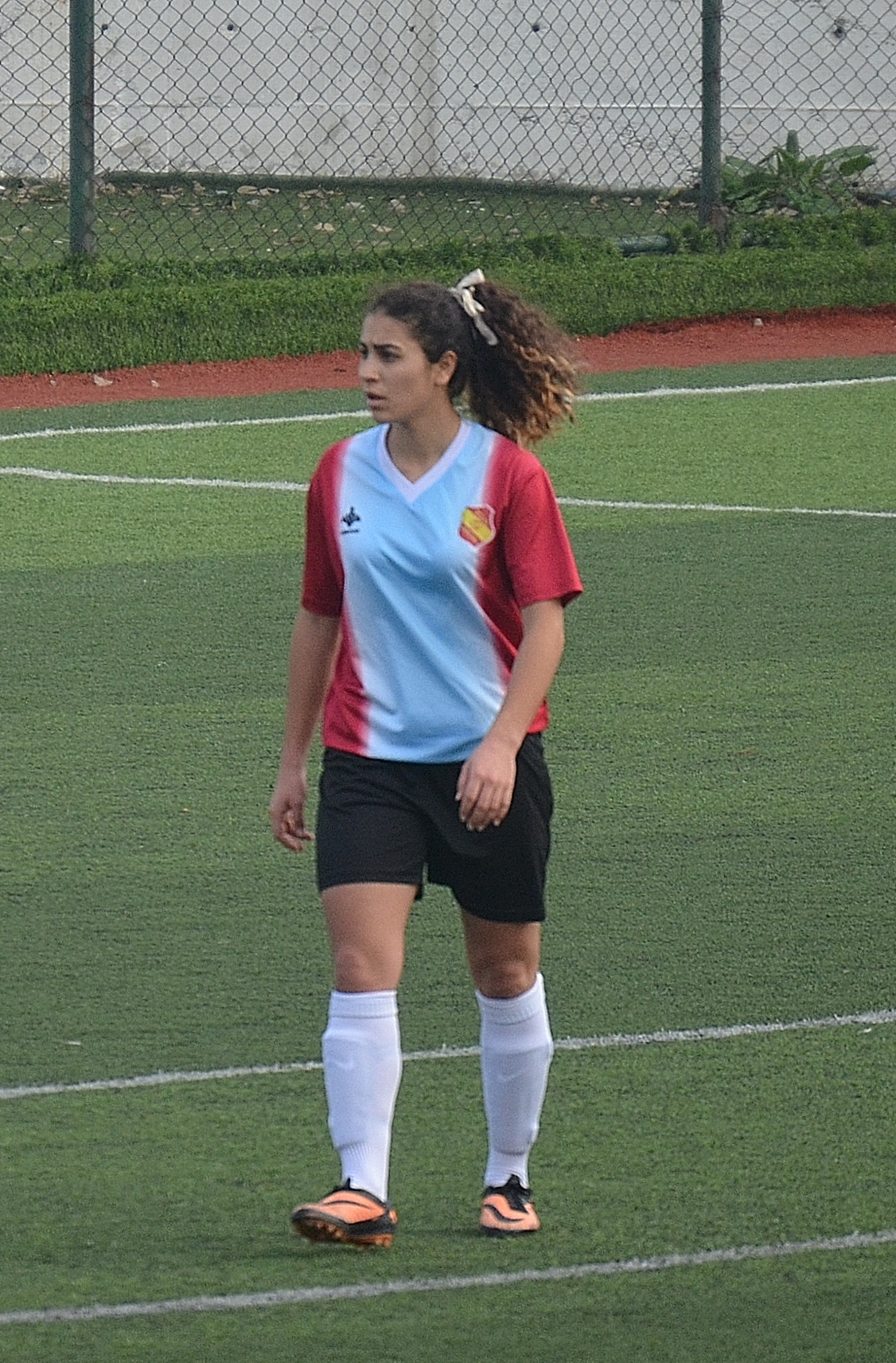
- Esra Somaz for Trabzon Şdmanocağı (women) (2014–14 season)

Personal information
- Date of birth: March 20, 1995 (age 31)
- Place of birth: Elazığ, Turkey
- Position: Striker

Team information
- Current team: Balıkesir BB Spor
- Number: 9

Senior career*
Years	Team	Apps	(Gls)
2010–2013	Eskişehirspor	37	(29)
2013–2014	Kızılcık Spor	14	(18)
2014–2015	Trabzon İdmanocağı	20	(13)
2017–2018	Balıkesir BB Spor	8	(12)
Total		79	(72)

International career^{‡}
2011	Turkey U-17	2	(0)
- * Club domestic league appearances and goals as of February 18, 2018 ‡ National team caps and goals as of October 1, 2011

Esra Solmaz (born March 20, 1995) is a Turkish women's football striker, who last played in the Turkish Women's Third League for Balokesir Büyükşehir Belediyespor with jersey number 9. In 2011, she played for the Turkish girls' national U-17 team.

== Early life ==
Born in Elazığ on March 20, 1995, she grew up in Yalova with her family.

== Career ==
=== Club ===
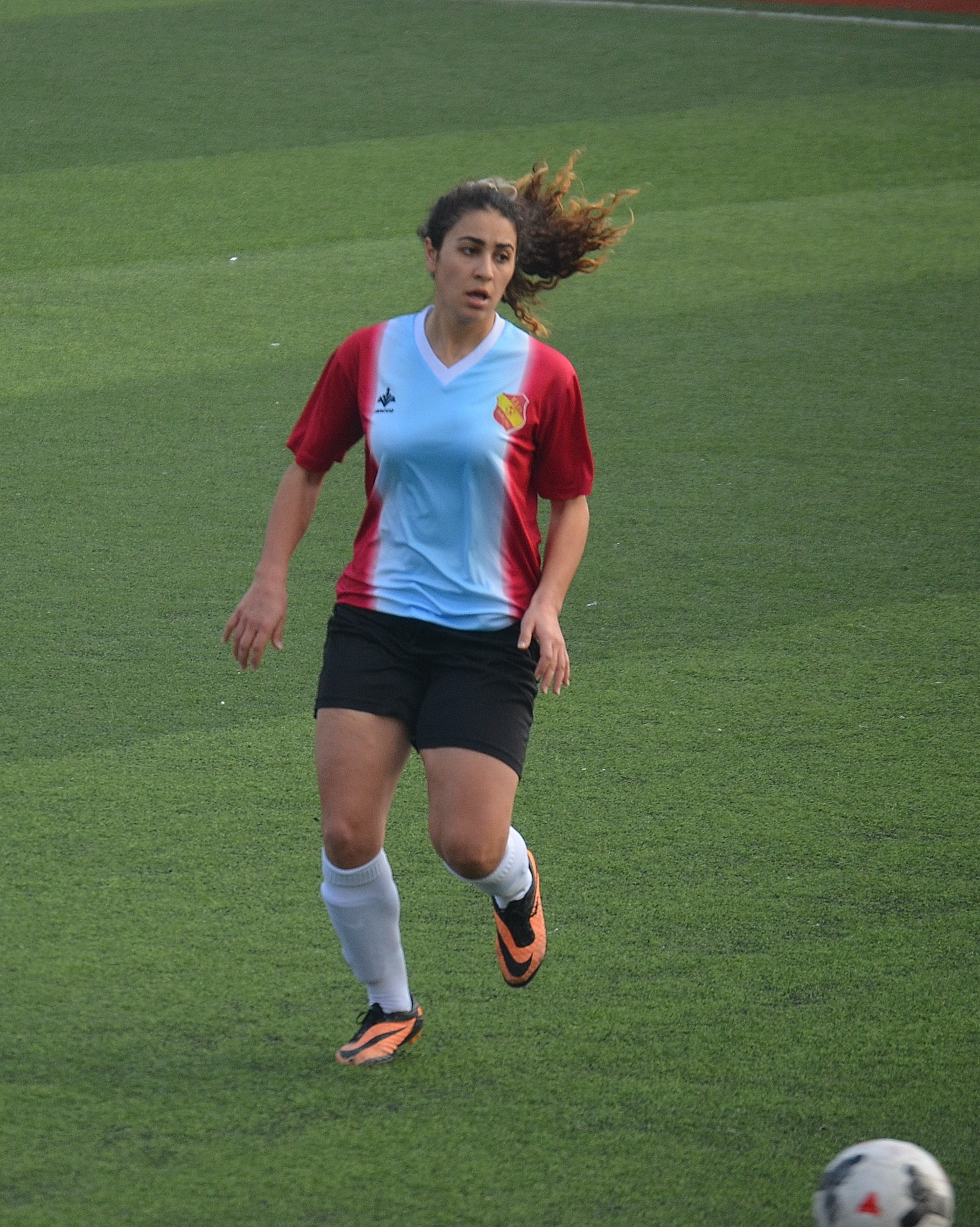
Esra Solmaz playing for Trabzon İdmanocağı in the away match against Ataşehir Belediyespor in the 2014–15 season.

She received her license on February 9, 2010 for Eskişehirspor, where she played until the end of the 2012–13 season capping 37 times and scoring 29 goals. In August 2012, she suffered a serious leg injury, which led her to stay away from the football field some time. After one season with Kızılcık Spor in Sakarya Province. she transferred to Trabzon İdmanocağı in October 2014. She scored 13 goals in 20 games of two First League seasons. In the 2017-18 season, she moved to Balıkesir Büyükşehir Belediyespor playing in the Third League. After netting 12 goals in eight matches, she retired.

=== International ===
Esra Solmaz was called up to the Turkey girls' U-17 team, and debuted in the 2012 UEFA Championship qualifying round – Group 7 match against Serbia on September 29, 2011. She was capped twice for the Turkey U-17 national team.

== Career statistics ==
As of February 18, 2018

Club	Season	League			Continental		National		Total	
Club	Season	Division	Apps	Goals	Apps	Goals	Apps	Goals	Apps	Goals
Eskişehirspor	2009–10	Regional League	10	0	–	–	0	0	10	0
Eskişehirspor	2010–11	Regional League	9	5	–	–	0	0	9	5
Eskişehirspor	2011–12	Second League	13	22	–	–	2	0	15	22
Eskişehirspor	2012–13	First League	5	2	–	–	0	0	5	2
Eskişehirspor	Total		37	29	–	–	2	0	39	29
Kızılcık Spor	2013–14	Second League	14	18	–	–	0	0	14	18
Kızılcık Spor	Total		14	18	–	–	0	0	14	18
Trabzon İdmanocağı	2014–15	First League	16	11	–	–	0	0	16	11
Trabzon İdmanocağı	2015–16	First League	4	2	–	–	0	0	4	2
Trabzon İdmanocağı	Total		20	13	–	–	0	0	20	13
Balıkesir BB Spor	2017–18	Third League	8	12	–	–	0	0	8	12
Balıkesir BB Spor	Total		8	12	–	–	0	0	8	12
Career total			79	72	–	–	2	0	81	72
