= Özge Özel =

Turkish footballer (born 1991)

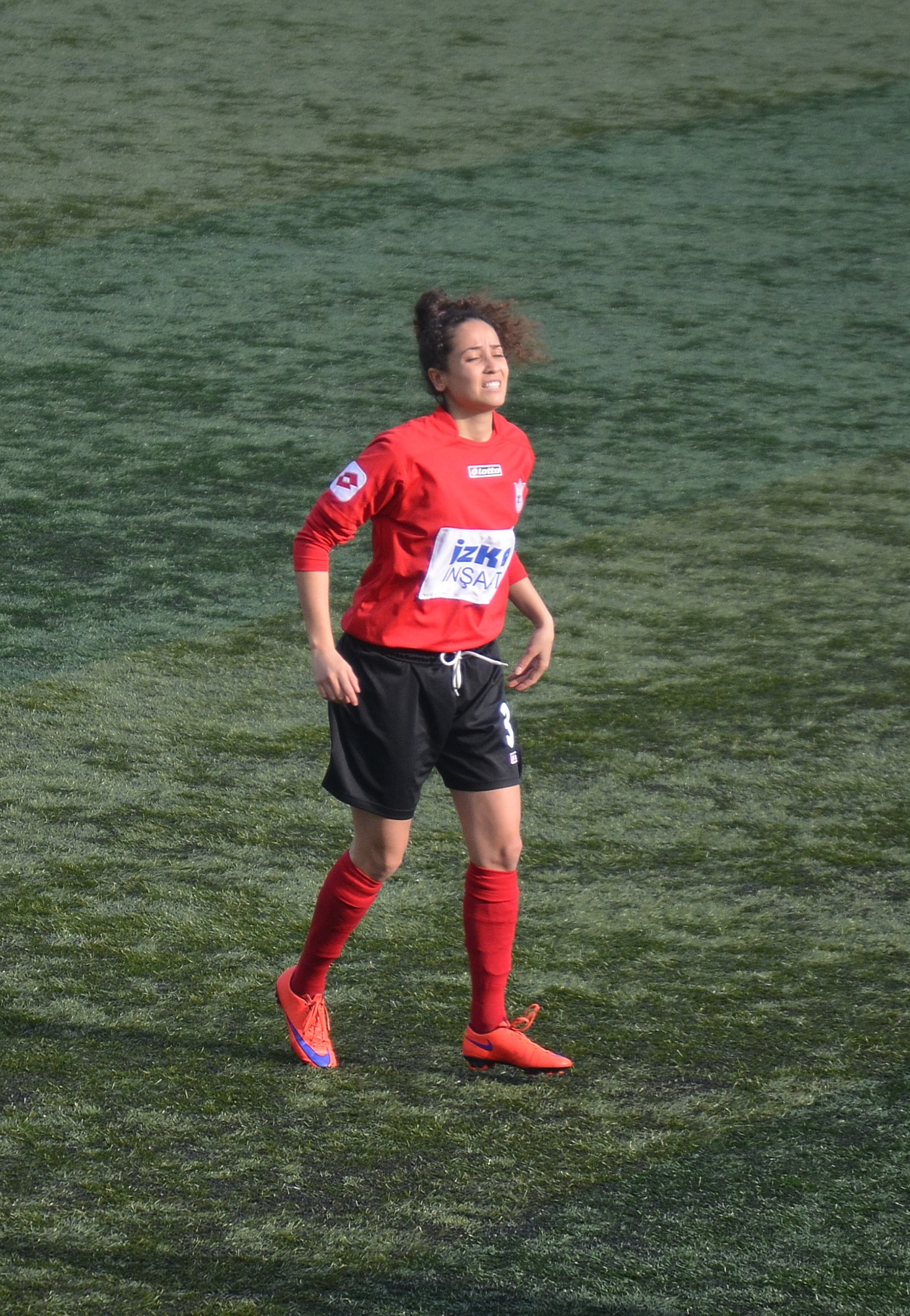
- Özge Özel playing for Konak Belediyespor (December 2015)

Personal information
- Date of birth: March 5, 1991 (age 35)
- Place of birth: Konak, İzmir, Turkey
- Position: Forward

Team information
- Current team: Konak Belediyespor
- Number: 35

Senior career*
Years	Team	Apps	(Gls)
2008–2011	Bucaspor	52	(29)
2011–2012	Kdz. Ereğlispor	12	(2)
2013–2014	Kızılcaköyspor	3	(2)
2014–2015	Karşıyaka BESEM Spor	2	(0)
2015–	Konak Belediyespor	8	(3)
Total		77	(36)

International career
2006–2007	Turley U-17	11	(0)
2006–2009	Turley U-19	22	(1)
- * Club domestic league appearances and goals as of March 27, 2016

Özge Özel (born March 5, 1991) is a Turkish women's football forward currently playing in the Turkish Women's First Football League for Konak Belediyespor in İzmir.

== Playing career ==
=== Club ===
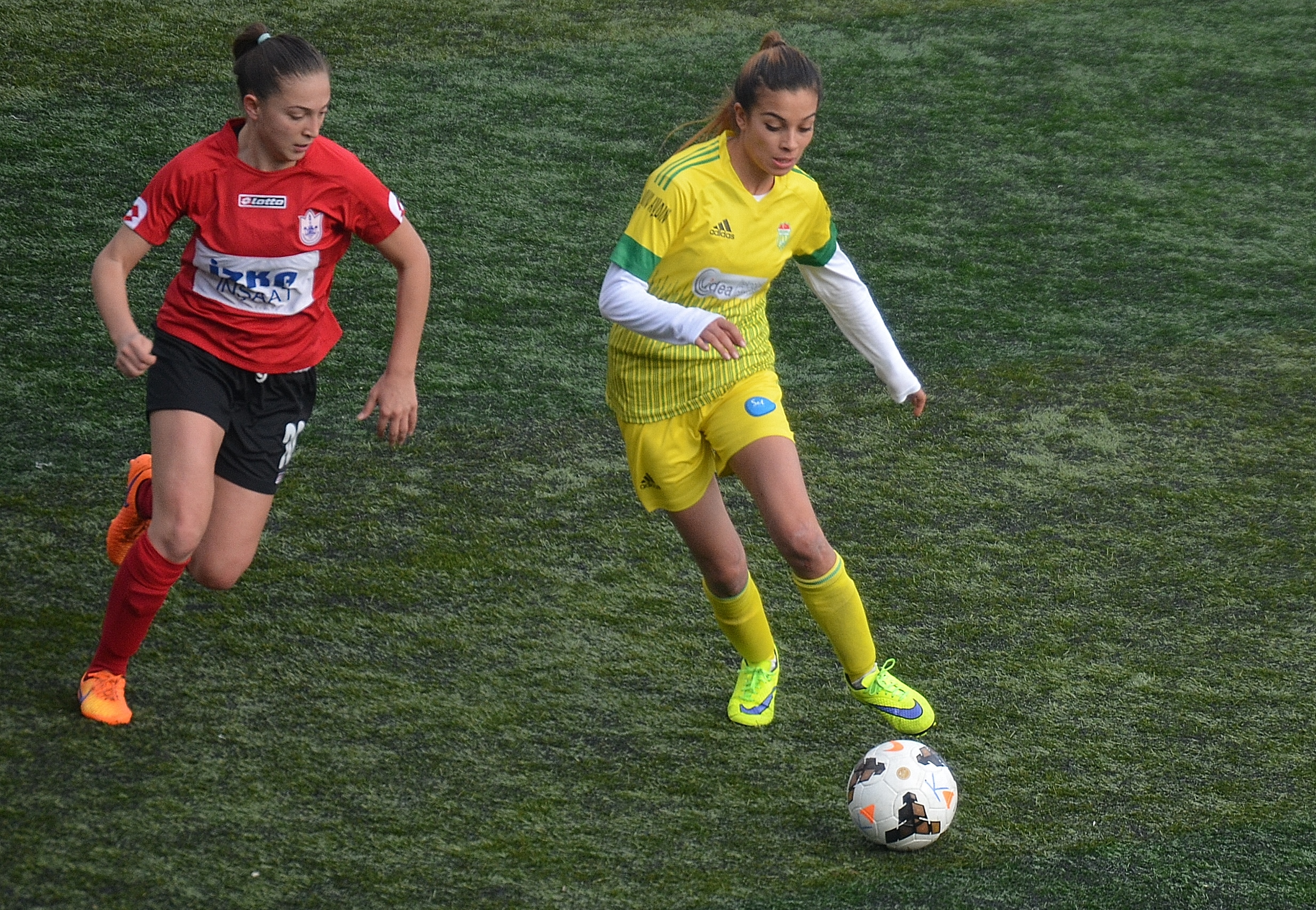
Özge Özel (left) playing for Konak Belediyespor in the away match of the 2014–15 season against Kireçburnu Spor.

Özge Özel obtained her license on April 28, 2006, for Bucaspor, and began playing in the 2008–09 season of the Women's First League. After capping in 52 matches and scoring 29 goals in three seasons, she was transferred by Kdz. Ereğlispor in the second half of the 2011–12 season. She stood away from the pitch one season, and then moved to Second League-club Kızılcaköyspor in Aydın for the second half of the 2013–14 season, where she appeared in three games. With the beginning of the 2014–15 season's second half, Özel joined the İzmir-based Karşıyaka BESEM Spor, which was recently promoted to the First League. Her team was relegated at the end of the season, and she transferred to her hometown club Konak Belediyespor. She played in three matches of the 2015–16 UEFA Women's Champions League qualifying round.

=== International ===
Özge Özel played for the Turley girls' national U-17 team in eleven matches between 2006 and 2007. Between 2006 and 2009, She was also a member of the Turley women's U-19 team, where she capped 22 times scoring one goal.

== Career statistics ==
As of March 27, 2016.

Club	Season	League			Continental		National		Total	
Club	Season	Division	Apps	Goals	Apps	Goals	Apps	Goals	Apps	Goals
Bucaspor	2006–08	First League	0	0	–	–	21	0	21	0
Bucaspor	2008–09	First League	18	18	–	–	9	0	27	18
Bucaspor	2009–10	First League	12	7	–	ü	3	1	15	8
Bucaspor	2010–11	First League	22	4	–	–	0	0	22	4
Bucaspor	Total		52	29	–	–	33	1	85	30
Kdz. Ereğlispor	2011–12	First League	12	2	–	–	0	0	12	2
Kdz. Ereğlispor	Total		12	2	–	–	0	0	12	2
Kızılcaköyspor	2013–14	Second League	3	2	–	–	0	0	3	2
Kızılcaköyspor	Total		3	2	–	–	0	0	3	2
Karşıyaka BESEM Spor	2014–15	First League	2	0	–	–	0	0	2	0
Karşıyaka BESEM Spor	Total		2	0	–	–	0	0	2	0
Konak Belediyespor	2015–16	First League	8	3	3	0	0	0	11	3
Konak Belediyespor	Total		8	3	3	0	0	0	11	3
Career total			77	36	3	0	33	1	113	37

== Honours ==
Turkish Women's First League

Bucaspor
Runners-up (1): 2008–09

Kdz. Ereğlispor
Runners-up (1): 2011–12

Konak Belediyespor
Winners (1): 2015–16
