= Birgül Sadıkoğlu =

Turkish footballer (born 2000)

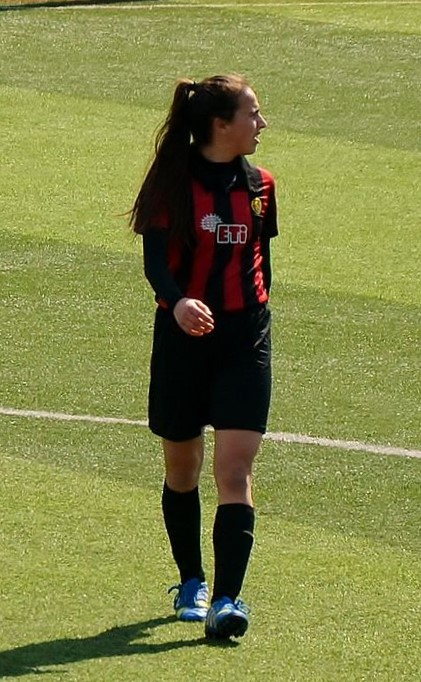
- Birgül Sadıkoğlu of Eskişehir (March 2015)

Personal information
- Date of birth: March 23, 2000 (age 26)
- Place of birth: Eskişehir, Turkey
- Position: Midfielder

Team information
- Current team: Trabzon
- Number: 23

Senior career*
Years	Team	Apps	(Gls)
2014–2016	Eskişehirspor	30	(9)
2016–2017	Bozüyük	22	(45)
2017–2019	Eskişehir Öncü	24	(62)
2019–2020	Konak	16	(7)
2021–2022	Zhytlobud-1 Kharkiv	0	(0)
2022–2023	Galatasaray	29	(18)
2023–2024	ABB Fomget	15	(1)
2024	Tenerife		
2024–	Huelva		
2025–	Trabzon	4	(3)

International career^{‡}
2015–2017	Turkey U-17	19	(6)
2017–2019	Turkey U-19	15	(2)
2019–	Turkey	38	(8)
- * Club domestic league appearances and goals as of 11 October 2025 ‡ National team caps and goals as of 29 October 2024

Birgül Sadıkoğlu (born March 23, 2000) is a Turkish women's football midfielder who plays for Trabzon in the Turkish Super League. She played for the Turkey U-17 and U-19 teams before she became a member of the Turkey national team.

She graduated from a vocational technical and industrial high school in Eskişehir.

== Club career ==
She played football in her school's football team. In 2013, she became top scorer with five goals in the Turkish Intra-school Cadets Football Championship held in Kastamonu.

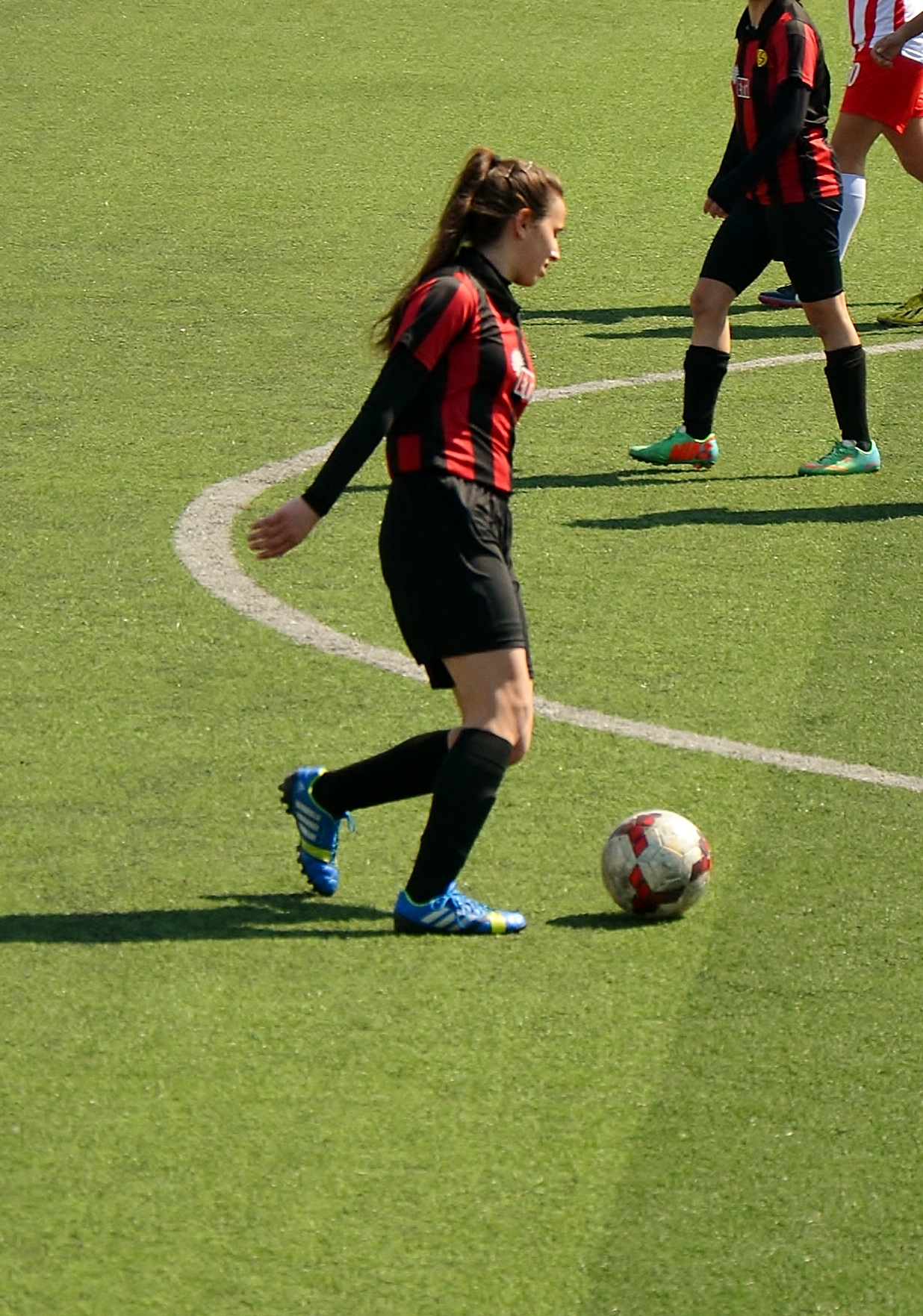
Birgül Sadıkoğlu playing for Eskişehir in the away match of the 2014–15 season against Ataşehri.

Birgül Sadıkoğlu obtained her license on May 31, 2012, and entered Eskişehirspor in her hometown.

She became Top scorer at the 2013 Turkish Interschool Football Championship for Girls held in Kastamonu, and repeated her achievement at the same competition the next year in Samsun.

As Eskişehir was relegated from the Women's First league, she transferred by October 2016 to Bozüyük Halk Eğitim Gençlik ve Spor club in the Third League. The following season, she moved to Eskişehir Öncü Spor ve Gençlik, which played also in the Third League. After three seasons in total in the Third League, she was signed by the İzmir-based club Konak Belediyespor in the 2019–20 season.

=== Zhytlobud-1 Kharkiv ===
On 23 February 2021, she moved to Ukraine and joined WFC Zhytlobud-1 Kharkiv to play in the Ukrainian Women's League.

=== Galatasaray ===
On 1 February 2022, the Turkish Women's Football Super League team was transferred to the Galatasaray club.

=== ABB Fomget ===
In August 2023, Sadıkoğlu transferred to the 2022–23 Super Leagıe champion ABB Fomget. She took part at the 2023–24 UEFA Women's Champions League and scored one goal each in the matches against the Icelandic Valur and Hajvalia from Kosova.

=== Trabzon ===
In September 2025, she transferred to Trabzon.

== International career ==
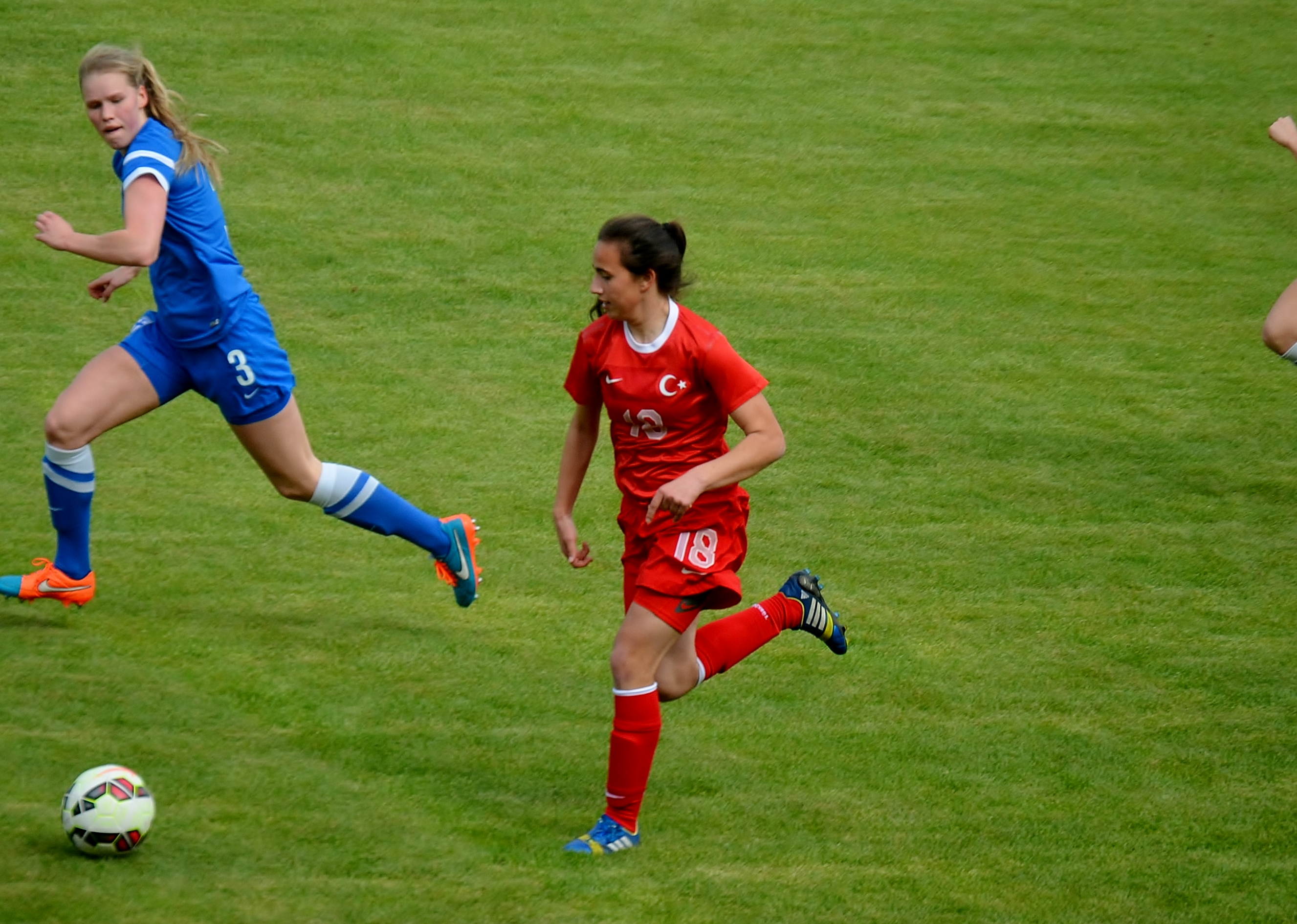
Birgül Sadıkoğlu in the Turkey women's national under-17 football team (red) driving the ball at 2015 UEFA Women's Under-17 Championship qualification Elite round match against Finland.

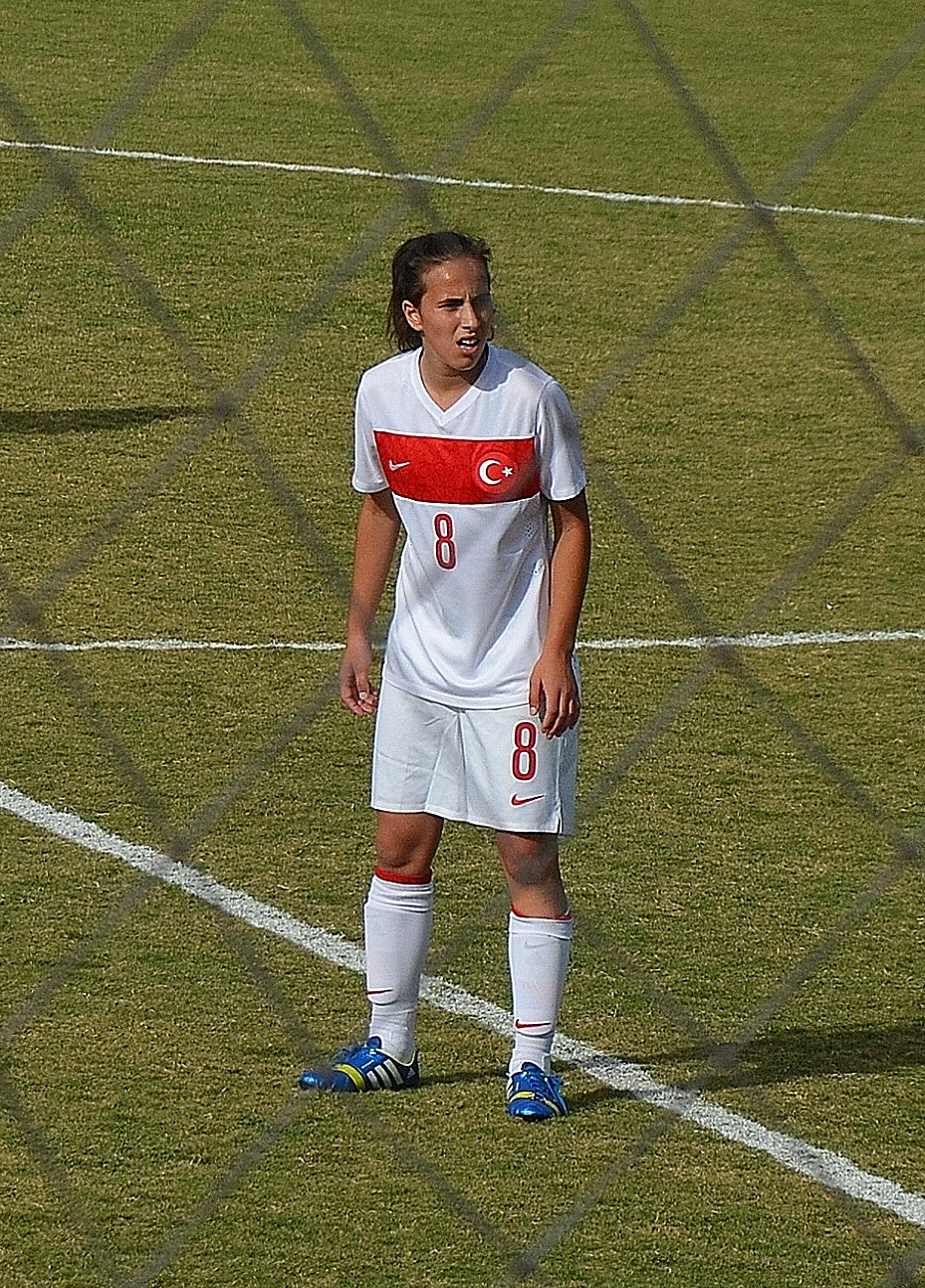
Birgül Sadıkoğlu playing for Turkey Women's U17 at 2016 UEFA Women's Under-17 Championship qualification match against Ireland.

She was called up to the Turkey girls' national U-15 team.

Sadıkoğlu debuted in the Turkey U-17 team appearing at the 2015 UEFA Women's Under-17 Championship qualification- Elite round match against Finland. She capped in all three games of the tournament. She scored two goals in the first match of the 2016 UEFA Women's Under-17 Championship qualification – Group 1 against Andorra. She also played at the 2017 UEFA Women's Under-17 Championship qualification – Group 7 and the 2017 UEFA Development Cup matches. She scored in total six goals for the national U-17 team in 19 matches.

In 2017, she entered the Turkey women's U-19 team. She took part at the 2017 UEFA Women's Under-19 Championship qualification – Elite round, 2019 UEFA Women's Under-19 Championship qualification – Group 2 and Elite round matches. She capped 15 times and scored two goals.

On 11 November 2019, Sadıkoğlu debuted in the Turkey women's national team. She scored one goal each at the 2023 FIFA Women's World Cup qualification – UEFA Group H against Israel, and at the 2023–24 UEFA Women's Nations League C against Georgia, Lithuania, and Luxembourg.

== Career statistics ==
=== Club ===
As of 11 October 2025.

Club	Season	League			Continental		National		Total	
Club	Season	Division	Apps	Goals	Apps	Goals	Apps	Goals	Apps	Goals
Eskişehir	2014–15	First League	13	4	–	–	6	0	19	4
Eskişehir	2015–16	First League	17	5	–	–	6	2	23	7
Eskişehir	Total		30	9	–	–	12	2	42	11
Bozüyük	2016–17	Third League	22	45	–	–	5	1	27	46
Eskişehir Öncü	2017–18	Third League	13	48	–	–	7	3	20	51
Eskişehir Öncü	2018–19	Third League	11	14	–	–	10	2	21	16
Eskişehir Öncü	Total		24	62	–	–	17	5	41	67
Konak	2019–20	First League	16	7	–	–	2	0	18	7
Konak	2020–21	First League	0	0	–	–	3	0	3	0
Konak	Total		16	7	–	–	5	0	21	7
Galatasarayr	2021–22	Super League	9	5	–	–	11	1	20	6
Galatasarayr	2022–23	Super League	20	13	–	–	5	1	25	14
Galatasarayr	Total		29	18	–	–	16	2	45	20
ABB Fomget	2023–24	Super League	15	1	2	2	13	5	230	5
Tenerife	2024	Liga F			0	0	4	1	4	1
Trabzon	2025–26	Super League	4	3	0	0	0	0	4	3
Career total			140	158	2	2	72	16	214	176

=== International ===
International goals (^{†})
Date	Venue	Opponent	Competition	Result	Scored
Turkey women's
30 November 2021	Mersin Arena, Mersin, Turkey	Israel	2023 FIFA Women's World Cup qualification – UEFA Group H	W 3–2	1
22 September 2023	Mikheil Meskhi Stadium, Tbilisi, Georgia	Georgia	2023–24 UEFA Women's Nations League C	W 3–0	1
26 September 2023	Elazığ Atatürk Stadium, Elazığ, Turkey	Lithuania	2023–24 UEFA Women's Nations League C	W 2–0	1
31 October 2023	New Çorum Stadium, Çorum, Turkey	Luxembourg	2023–24 UEFA Women's Nations League C	W 1–0	1
16 July 2024	Gyirmóti Stadion, Gyirmót, Hungary	Hungary	UEFA Women's Euro 2025 qualifying League B Group 1	W 4–1	1

(^{†}): Friendly matches not included

== Honours ==
=== Individual ===
Turkish Women's Third League
Topscorer (41 goals) 2017–18 season with Eskişehir Öncü GS.
