= Selda Akgöz =

Turkish footballer (born 1993)

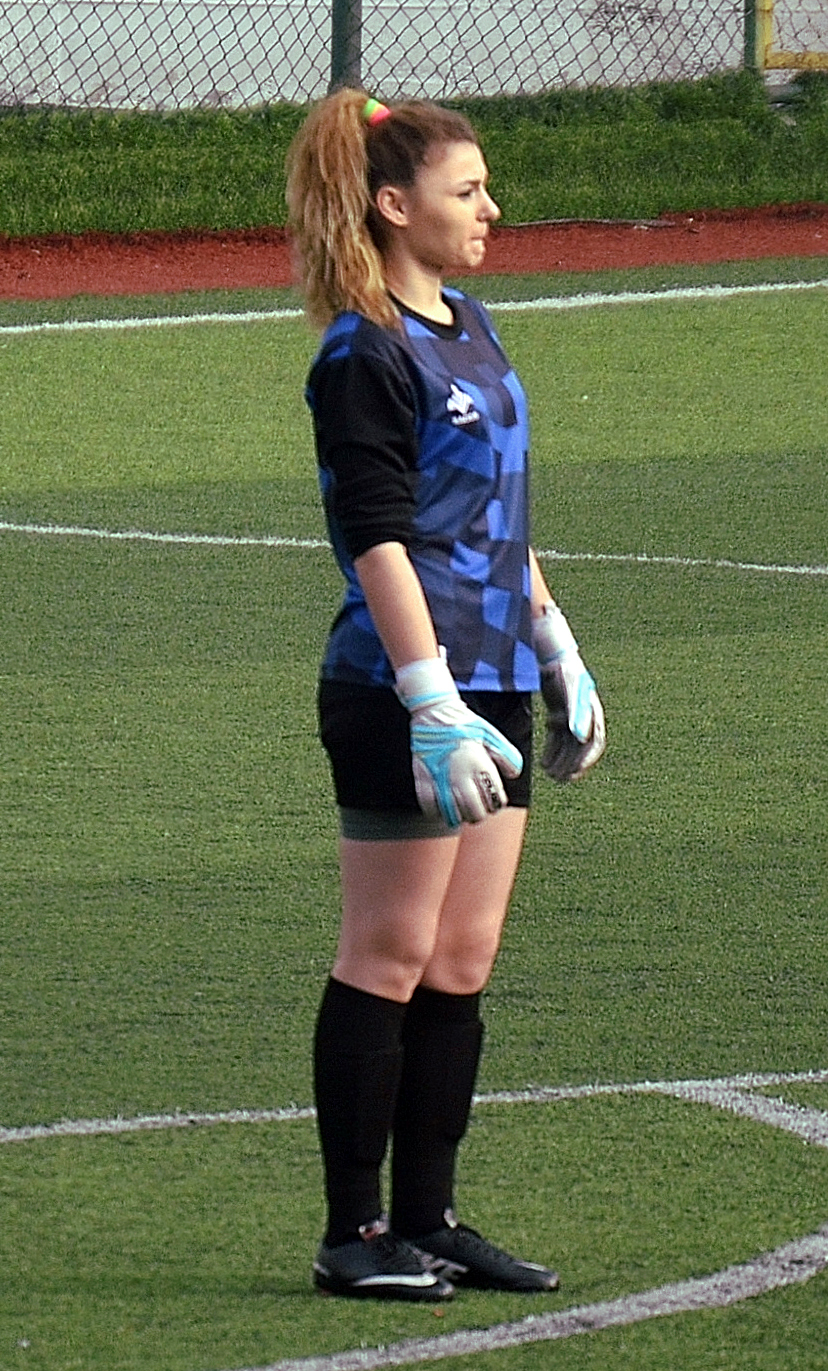
- Selda Akgöz for Trabzon İdmanocağı (December 2014)

Personal information
- Date of birth: June 9, 1993 (age 33)
- Place of birth: Çaycuma, Zonguldak, Turkey
- Height: 1.80 m (5 ft 11 in)
- Position: Goalkeeper

Team information
- Current team: Ankara BB Fomget GS
- Number: 1

Senior career*
Years	Team	Apps	(Gls)
2009–2011	Ovacık Gençlik Spor	25	(2)
2011–2014	Fomget	37	(1)
2014–2017	Trabzon İdmanocağı	57	(1)
2017–2018	Kdz. Ereğli	17	(0)
2018–2020	Ataşehir	32	(0)
2020–2022	ALG	30	(0)
2022–	Ankara BB Fomget	68	(0)

International career^{‡}
2010	Turkey U-17	3	(0)
2011–2012	Turkey U-19	14	(0)
2014	Turkey U-21	1	(0)
2015–	Turkey	55	(0)
- * Club domestic league appearances and goals as of 4 May 2025 ‡ National team caps and goals as of 8 April3 June 2025

Selda Akgöz (born June 9, 1993) is a Turkish women's footballer who plays as a goalkeeper in the Turkish Women's Football Super League for Ankara BB Fomget GS. She is a member of the Turkey women's team.

== Early years ==
Selda Akgöz was born in Çaycuma town of Zonguldak Province on June 9, 1993. Already in school years, she began playing handball before she switched over to volleyball. In the end, she found herself in football through her teacher's suggestion. From the beginning on, she wanted to be a goalkeeper and got enthusiastic about diving save, which she still performs.

== Club career ==
Selda Akgöz obtained her license on March 5, 2009, for the Regional League team Ovacık Gençlik Spor in Karabük. After graduation from the high school and playing 26 matches in two seasons, she moved to Fomget Gençlik ve Spor in Ankara to play in the Women's First league and to begin with her university study in physical education and sports there. She became captain of the team, and appeared at 37 matches in three seasons before she was transferred by Trabzon İdmanocağı in the 2014–15 season.

By August 2017, she transferred to the İzmir-based league-champion Konak Belediyespor, and took part at the 2017–18 UEFA Champions League as the reserve goalkeeper. In October of the same year, she left Konak Belediyespor to join Kdz. Ereğlispor in the 2017–18 season.

On June 1, 2018, Akgöz signed with the Istanbul-based club Ataşehir Belediyespor before the club's participation at the 2018–19 UEFA Women's Champions League qualifying round. She played in two of the three matches of the qualification round.

By August 2020, she transferred to the Gaziantep-based 2019–20 Women's League season top club ALG Spor. She enjoyed the 2021–22 Women's Super League champion title of her team.

Akgöz transferred to her former club Ankara BB Fomget GS in October 2022. She won the champions title in the 2022–23 season, became runners-up the next season, and again won the champions title in the 2024–25 season.

== International career ==
Selda Akgöz was admitted to the Turkey girls' U-17 team for the 2010 UEFA Championship qualifying round – Group 4 matches. However, she played first time at the International Friendly Tournament in the match against Bulgaria on June 27, 2010. She capped 3 times for the U-17 nationals.

She was called up to the Turkey women's U-19 team for the 2011 UEFA Women's U-19 Championship First qualifying round – Group 9, at which she served as substitute only. She debuted in the 2011 Kuban Spring Tournament match against China on March 10. Finally, Akgöz participated at the 2012 UEFA Women's Under-19 Championship – Group A matches. She played 14 times in total for the Turkey women's U-19 team.

On November 26, 2014, Selda Akgöz played the goalkeeper of the Turkey women's U-21 team in the friendly game against Belgium.

Selda Akgöz debuted in the Turkey women's team in a friendly match against Georgia on February 26, 2015.

== Career statistics ==
As of 4 May 2025.

Club	Season	League			Continental		National		Total	
Club	Season	Division	Apps	Goals	Apps	Goals	Apps	Goals	Apps	Goals
Ovacık Gençlik Spor	2009–10	Regional League	8	0	–	–	2	0	10	0
Ovacık Gençlik Spor	2010–11	Second League	17	2	–	–	4	0	21	2
Ovacık Gençlik Spor	Total		25	2	–	–	6	0	31	2
Fomget	2011–12	First League	18	0	–	–	8	0	26	0
Fomget	2012–13	First League	17	1	–	–	3	0	20	1
Fomget	2013–14	Second League	2	0	–	–	0	0	2	0
Fomget	Total		37	1	–	–	11	0	48	1
Trabzon İdmanocağı	2014–15	First League	16	0	–	–	2	0	18	0
Trabzon İdmanocağı	2015–16	First League	17	1	–	–	4	0	21	1
Trabzon İdmanocağı	2016–17	First League	24	0	–	–	5	0	29	0
Trabzon İdmanocağı	Total		57	1	–	–	11	0	68	1
Kdz. Ereğli	2017–18	First League	17	0	–	–	2	0	19	0
Ataşehir	2018–19	First League	16	0	2	0	3	0	21	0
Ataşehir	2019–20	First League	16	0	0	0	5	0	21	0
Ataşehir	Total		32	0	2	0	8	0	42	0
ALG	2020–21	First League	6	0	–	–	2	0	8	0
ALG	2021–22	Super League	24	0	–	–	9	0	33	0
ALG	Total		30	0	–	-	11	0	41	0
Ankara BB Fomget	2022–23	Super League	17	0	–	–	4	0	21	0
Ankara BB Fomget	2023–24	Super League	29	0	–	–	9	0	38	0
Ankara BB Fomget	2024–25	Super League	22	0	–	–	8	0	30	0
Ankara BB Fomget	Total		68	0	–	-	21	0	89	0
Career total			266	4	2	0	70	0	338	4

== Honours ==
=== Club ===
Turkish Women's First League

Trabzon İdmanocağı
Third places (2): 2014–15, 2015–16

ALG
Champions (1): 2021–22
Third places (1): 2020–21

Turkish Women's Super League

Ankara BB Fomget
Champions (2): 2022–23, 2024–25
Runners-up (1): 2023–24

=== Individual ===
Crystal Feet – Best Goalkeeper: 2023–24.
