= Selin Sivrikaya =

Turkish women's football midfielder (born 1997)

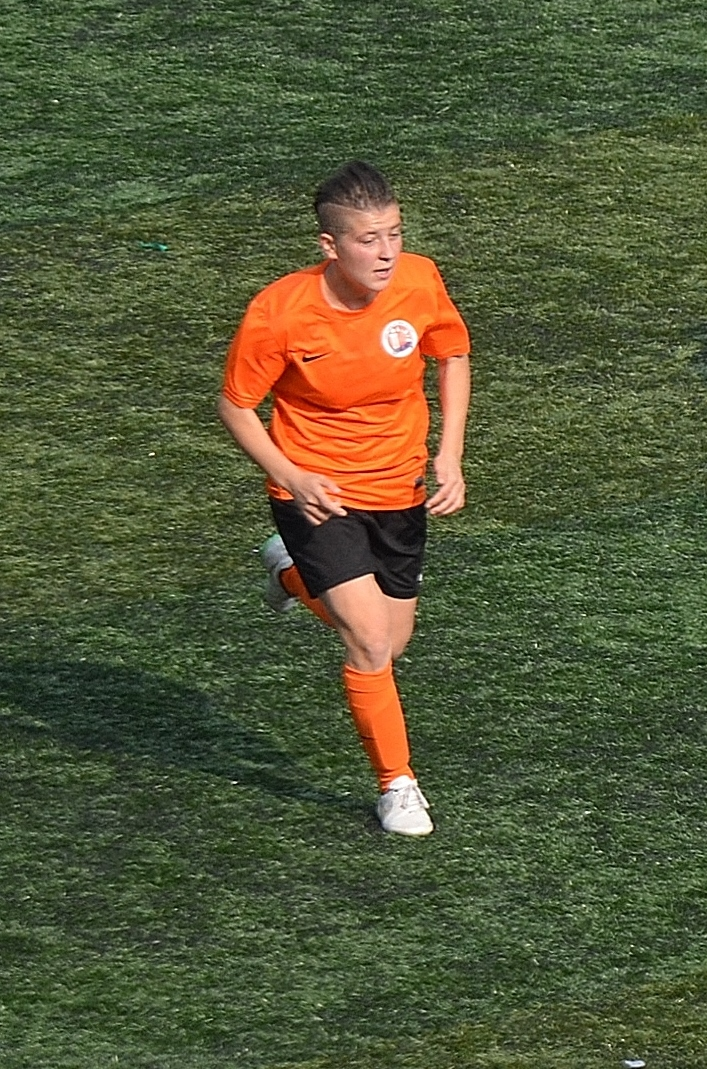
- Selin Sivrikaya for 1207 Antalyaspor in the 2015–16 season

Personal information
- Date of birth: January 1, 1997 (age 29)
- Place of birth: Akhisar, Manisa, Turkey
- Position: Midfielder

Team information
- Current team: 1207 Antalya
- Number: 7

Senior career*
Years	Team	Apps	(Gls)
2012–2014	Karşıyaka BESEM Spor	19	(45)
2014–2016	1207 Antalyaspor	22	(9)
2016–	Kireçburnu Spor	33	(12)
2019	Soma Zafer	4	(2)
2021–2022	Kireçburnu	23	(3)
2022–	1207 Antalya	63	(16)

International career^{‡}
2013–2014	Turkey U-17	9	(13)
2013–2015	Turkey U-19	31	(7)
2014	Turkey U-21	1	(0)
- * Club domestic league appearances and goals as of 4 October 2025 ‡ National team caps and goals as of 20 September 2015

Selin Sivrikaya (born January 1, 1997) is a Turkish women's football midfielder who plays in the Super League for 1207 Antalya with jersey number 7. She was a member of the Turkey women's U-19 team.

== Early life ==
Selin Sivrikaya was born to Bekir Sivrikaya and his wife Hülya in Akhisar town of Manisa Province on January 1, 1997. She was schooled in her hometown, and graduated from Akhisar Zeynep Gülin Öngör Vocational High School for Girls.

During her high school years, she played futsal and helped to her school team's achievement as becoming the champion of Manisa Province League and of the regional league.

== Club career ==
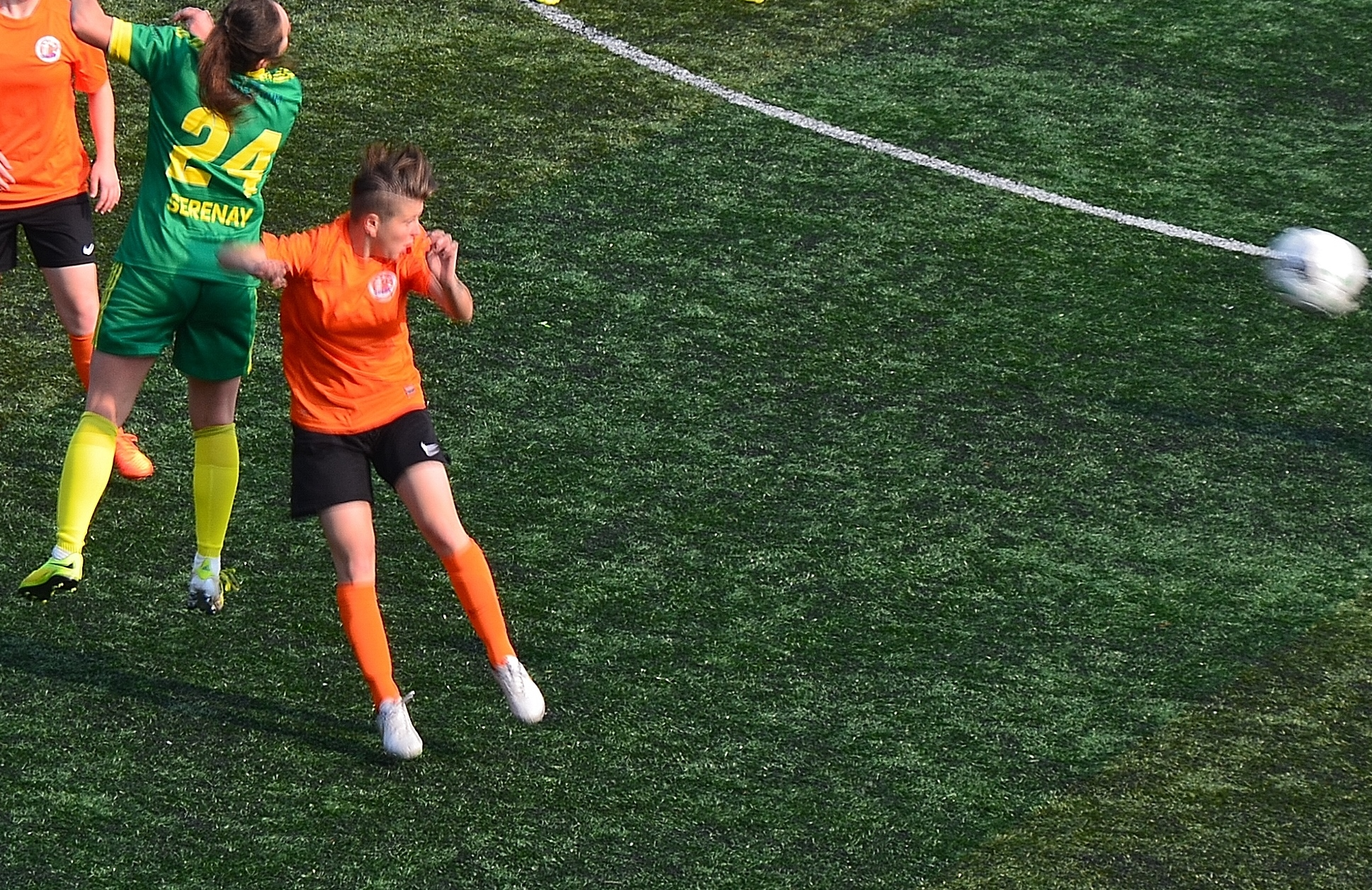
Selin Sivrikaya (orange/black) playing for 1207 Antalya Muratpaşa Belediye Spor in the 2015–16 season's away match against Kireçburnu Spor.

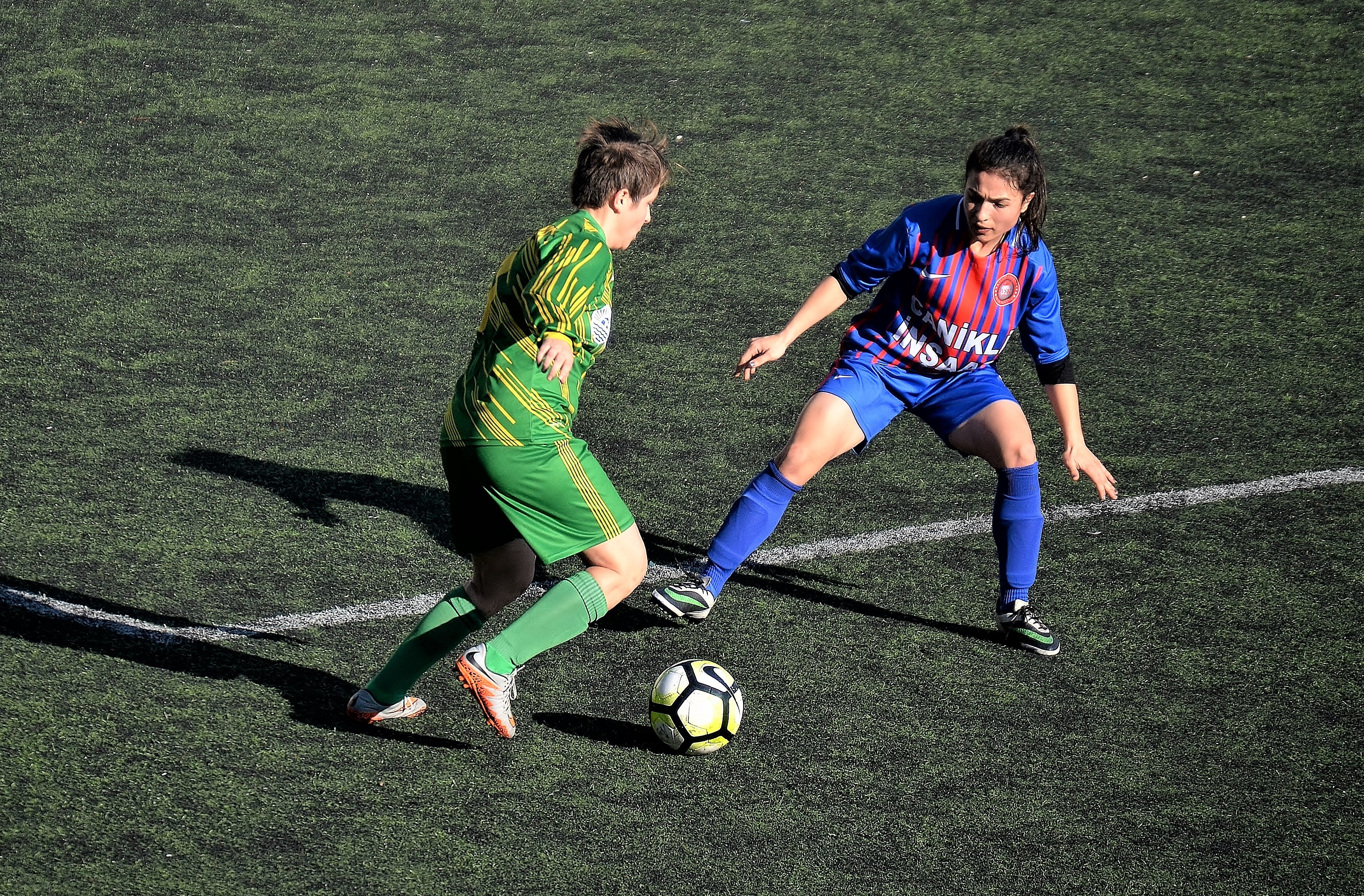
Selin Sivrikya (keft) of Kireçburnu Spor challenged by Safa Merve Nalçacı of Fatih Vatan Spor in the 2017–18 season match.

She obtained her license on March 9, 2012, for Karşıyaka BESEM Spor in İzmir, which competed in the Turkish Women's Second League. Sivrikaya played two seasons for her club and scored 45 goals in 19 matches. At the end of the 2013–14 season, she enjoyed her team's promotion to the Women's First League.

However, she transferred in January 2015 for the second-half season to 1207 Antalya Muratpaşa Belediye Spor, which played in the Second League. Sivrikaya enjoyed a second time the promotion of her team to the First League, this time with 1207 Antalya Muratpaşa Belediye Spor. In the 2015–16 season, she played in the Women's First League. The next season, Sivrikaya transferred to the Istanbul-based club Kireçburnu Spor.

In the 2022–23 Super League season, she returned to 1207 Antalya.

== International career ==
Selin Sivrikaya was admitted to the Turkey girls' U-17 team and debuted in the International Women's Under-17 Tournament against Slovenia on June 22, 2013, and already scored two goals in her first international appearance. She took part at the 2014 UEFA Women's Under-17 Championship qualification – Group 4 matches. She played in nine matches of the Turkey girls' U-17 team and scored thirteen goals until 2014. She ranks on second place of the all-time top goalscorers list.

On November 26, 2013, Sivrikaya appeared for the first time with the Turkey women's U-19 team in the friendly game against Azerbaijan. She played at the UEFA Women's Under-19 Championship qualification matches in 2014, 2015, 2015 Elite round and 2016. She capped 31 times in total and scored seven goals for the Turkey women's U-19 team.

She played once for the Turkey women's U-21 team in the friendly match against Belgium on November 26, 2014.

== Career statistics ==
As of match played 4 October 2025

Club	Season	League			Continental		National		Total	
Club	Season	Division	Apps	Goals	Apps	Goals	Apps	Goals	Apps	Goals
Karşıyaka BESEM	2012–13	Second League	10	19	–	–	3	6	13	25
Karşıyaka BESEM	2013–14	Second League	9	26	–	–	17	6	26	32
Karşıyaka BESEM	Total		19	45	–	–	20	12	39	57
1207 Antalya	2014–15	Second League	8	4	–	–	15	7	23	11
1207 Antalya	2015–16	First League	14	5	–	–	6	1	20	5
1207 Antalya	Total		22	9	–	–	21	8	43	17
Kireçburnu	2016–17	First League	15	7	–	–	0	0	15	7
Kireçburnu	2017–18	First League	18	5	–	–	0	0	18	5
Kireçburnu	Total		33	12	-	-			33	12
Soma Zafer	2018-2019	Third League	4	2	-	-	0	0	4	2
Kireçburnu	2021–22	Super League	23	3	-	-	0	0	23	3
1207 Antalya	2022–23	Super League	13	4	–	–	0	0	13	4
1207 Antalya	2023–24	Super League	26	3	–	–	0	0	26	3
1207 Antalya	2024–25	First League	21	9	–	–	0	0	21	9
1207 Antalya	2025–26	Super League	3	0	–	–	0	0	3	0
1207 Antalya	Total		63	16	–	–	0	0	63	16
Career total			164	87	–	–	41	20	205	107

== Honours ==
Turkish Women's First League

1207 Antalya
Third places (1): 2024–25

Turkish Women's Second League

Karşıyaka BESEM
Runners-up (1): 2013–14
Third places (1): 2012–13

1207 Antalya
Winners (1): 2014–15
