= Hatay Dumlupınarspor =

- Full name: Hatay Dumlupınarspor
- Chairman: İsmail Barın
- League: Turkish Women's Third Football League

Hatay Dumlupınarspor is a women's football club located in İskenderun near Hatay, southern Turkey. The team competes in Turkish Women's Third Football League.

== Statistics ==
Season	League	Pos	Pld	W	D	L	GF	GA	GD	Pts
2007–08	Women's League – Gr. E	5	8	0	0	8	3	55	-52	0
2008–09	Women's Second League - Gr.4	5	8	1	1	6	3	22	-19	4
2009–10	Women's Regional League– Gr. 4	1	5	4	1	0	30	3	+27	13
2010–11	Women's Second League	10	18	1	1	16	9	81	-72	4
2011–12	Women's Second League - Gr. Çukurova	2	8	5	1	2	14	13	+1	16
2012–13	Women's Second League – Gr. 7	5	12	4	1	7	15	65	50	13
2013–14	Women's Second League – Gr. 5	9	16	0	0	16	2	211	-209	−3 ^{1})
2014–15	Women's Third League – Gr. 6	7	12	1	0	11	11	119	-108	0 ^{2})
2015–16	Women's Third League – Gr. 6	8	18	5	0	13	23	198	175	15
2016–17	Women's Third League – Gr. 7	11	24	4	1	19	39	117	-78	13
2017–18	Women's Third League – Gr. 10	6	10	0	0	10	1	119	-118	0
2018–19	Women's Third League – Gr. 10	4	8	2	0	6	9	74	-65	0^{3})
2019–20	Women's Third League – Gr. 7	10	11	0	0	11	2	132	-130	0
Green marks a season followed by promotion, red a season followed by relegation.

Notes:

- ^{1}) Three penalty points were deducted by the Turkish Football Federation (TFF)
- ^{2}) Three penalty points were deducted by the TFF
- ^{3}) Six penalty points were deducted by the TFF
