= Turkish Women's Regional Football League =

Turkish football competition

Turkish Women's Regional Football League Kadınlar Bölgesel Futbol Ligi
- Founded: 2009
- Folded: 2011
- Country: Turkey
- Divisions: 4
- Number of clubs: 23
- Promotion to: Turkish Women's Second Football League
- Last champions: Marmara: Sakarya Bayan Futbolspor; Anadolu: Altaş Soyaspor; Ege: Bozkurt Spor Lisesispor; Doğu: Erzurum Albayraklarspor (2010–11)
- Website: Official website

The Turkish Women's Regional Football League (Turkish: Kadınlar Bölgesel Futbol Ligi) was the third-level league competition for women's association football in Turkey.

== History ==
The Women's Regional League was established in 2009 launching its first season in the 2009–10. It was replaced by Turkish Women's Third Football League in 2014.

== Format ==
At the 2010–11 season, 23 teams competed for promoting to the Women's Second League. They were divided into 4 groups according to their geographical location. In each group, teams play against each other home-and-away in a round-robin format. After folding all teams were promoted to Women's Second League.

Number of teams by season archive of the Turkish Football Federation
Regional League (3rd tier)

| 2009–10 | 22 |
| 2010–11 | 23 |

Total: 45

== Teams promoted to Women's Second League ==
| Season | Teams |
|---|---|
| 2009–10 | İzmit Belediyespor, Altınşehir Lisesispor, Bursa Sağlıkgücü Gençlikspor, Çamlıcaspor, Fomget Gençlik ve Spor, Ovacık Gençlik ve Spor, Hatay Dumlupınarspor |
| 2010–11 | Sakarya Bayan Futbolspor, Fatih Vatan Lisesispor, Kireçburnu Spor, Hüseyin Özdilek Tekstil Meslek Lisesi Gençlik ve S, Kaynarcaspor, Başkentgücüspor, İlkadım Belediyespor, Eskişehirspor, Yıldırım Beyazıt Şafakspor, Bozkurt Spor Lisesispor, Karşıyaka BESEM Spor, Nazilli Belediyespor, 7 Eylül Gençlik Spor, Mersin Gençlerbirliği, Elitspor, Hakkarigücü Spor, Organize Birlikspor, Dicle Aslanspor, Muş Lalespor |

== 2010–11 season ==
The 2010-11 Turkish Women's Regional Football League consisted of 23 teams.

| Group | Team | Hometown |
|---|---|---|
| Marmara | Bakırköy Gençlikspor | İstanbul, Bakırköy |
| Marmara | Fatih Vatan Lisesispor | İstanbul, Fatih |
| Marmara | Hüseyin Özdilek Tekstil Meslek Lisesi Gençlik ve S | Bursa, Nilüfer |
| Marmara | Kaynarcaspor | İstanbul, Pendik |
| Marmara | Kireçburnu Spor | İstanbul, Sarıyer |
| Marmara | Sakarya Bayan Futbolspor | Sakarya, Karasu |
| Anadolu | Altaş Soyaspor | Ordu |
| Anadolu | Başkentgücüspor | Ankara, Keçiören |
| Anadolu | Eskişehirspor | Eskişehir |
| Anadolu | İlkadım Belediyespor | Samsun, İlkadım |
| Anadolu | Keçiören Bağlumspor | Ankara, Keçiören |
| Anadolu | Yıldırım Beyazıt Şafakspor | Kayseri |
| Ege | 7 Eylül Gençlik Spor | Aydın, Efeler |
| Ege | Karşıyaka BESEM Spor | İzmir, Karşıyaka |
| Ege | Bozkurt Spor Lisesispor | Denizli, Bozkurt |
| Ege | Elitspor | İzmir, Balçova |
| Ege | Mersin Gençlerbirliği | Mersin |
| Ege | Nazilli Belediyespor | Aydın, Nazilli |
| Doğu | Dicle Aslanspor | Ağrı |
| Doğu | Erzurum Albayraklarspor | Erzurum, Palandöken |
| Doğu | Hakkarigücü Spor | Hakkâri |
| Doğu | Muş Lalespor | Muş |
| Doğu | Organize Birlikspor | Gaziantep |

== See also ==
- Women's football in Turkey
- Turkish Women's Football Super League
- Turkish Women's Football First League
- Turkish Women's Second Football League
- Turkish Women's Third Football League
- List of women's football clubs in Turkey
- Turkish women in sports
