= Karşıyaka BESEM Spor =

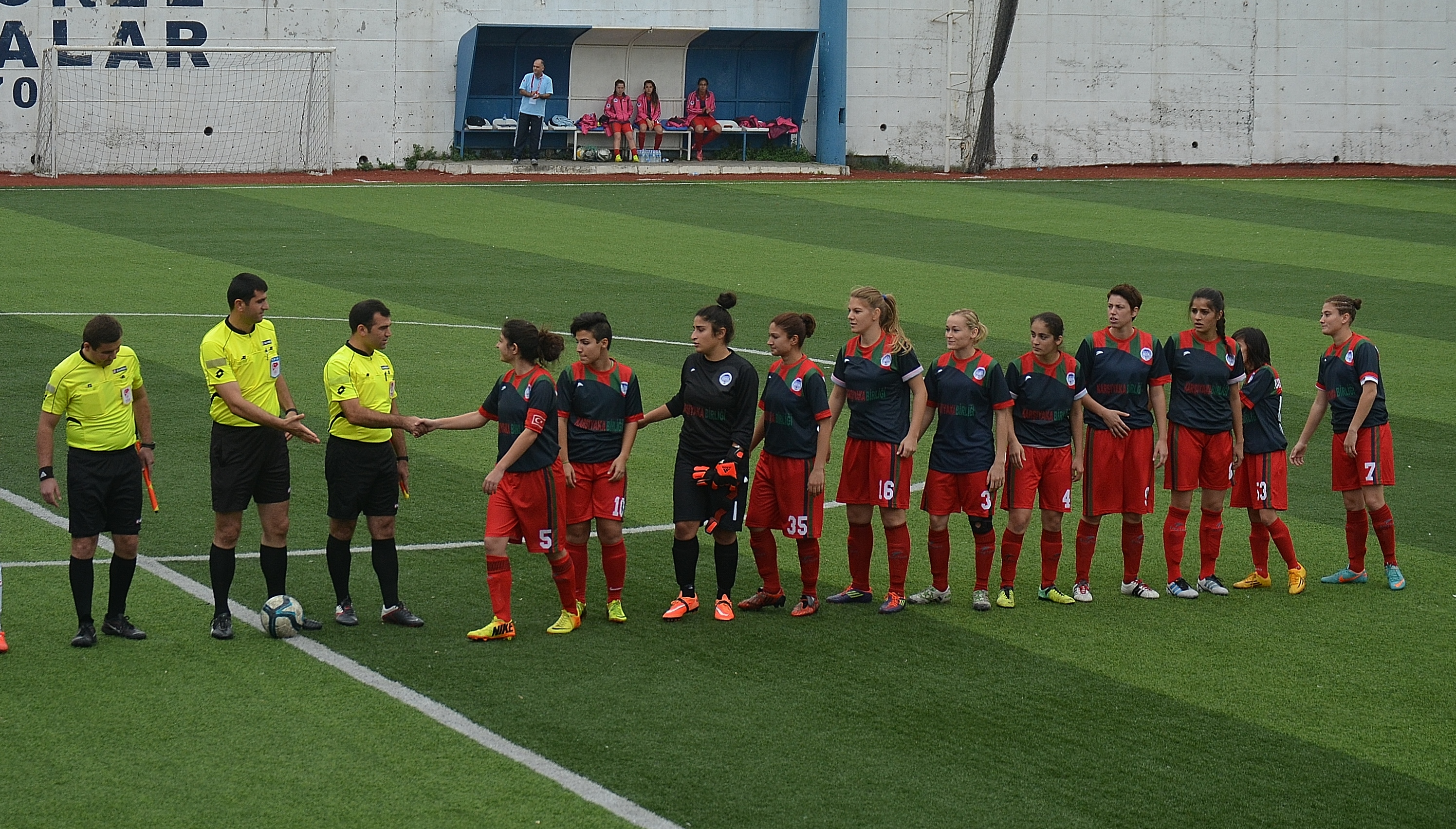
- Karşıyaka BESEM Spor team in the away match on October 26, 2014.
- Full name: Karşıyaka Beden Eğitimi ve Spor Eğitim Merkezi Spor Kulübü
- Founded: 2007
- Ground: Hasan Türker Stadium
- Coordinates: 38°27′58″N 27°05′19″E
- Manager: Feriha Paylar
- League: Turkish Women's First Football League
Away colours

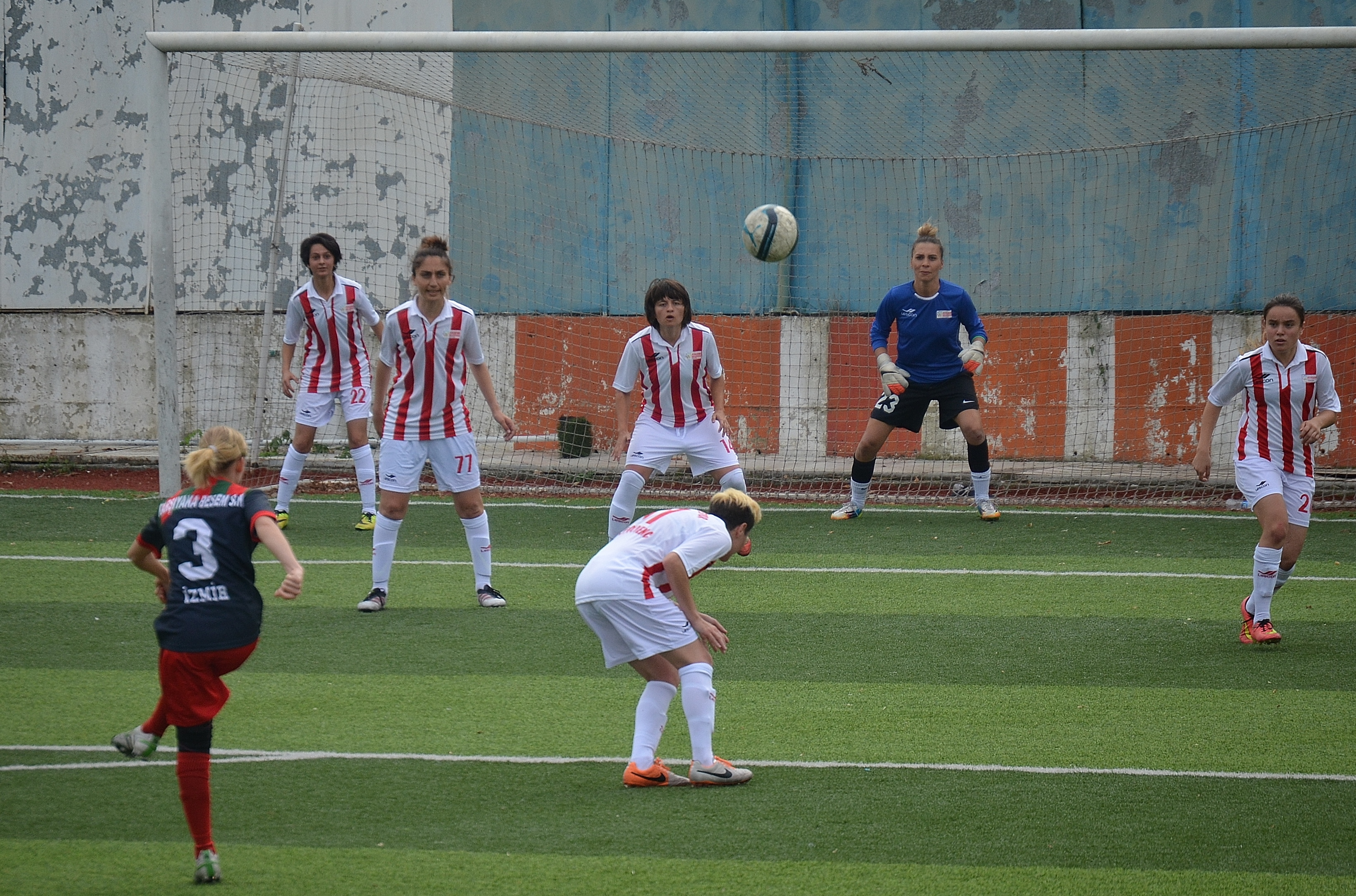
Karşıyaka BESEMSpor attacking Ataşehir Belediyespor in the away match on October 26, 2014.

Karşıyaka BESEM Spor, short for Karşıyaka Beden Eğitimi ve Spor Eğitim Merkezi Spor Kulübü, is a women's football club based in Karşıyaka district of İzmir, Turkey.

The club was founded by Feriha Paylar, who serves also as the team coach, and her husband Erbil Paylar in 2007.

After finishing the Division 4 of the Women's Second League in the 2013–14 season as the runners-up, and winning the second leg play-off match against Amasya Eğitim Spor, the team was promoted to play for the 2014–15 season in the Women's First League.

== Colors ==
The colors of Karşıyaka BESEM Spor are red, green and black.

== Stadium ==
Karşıyaka BESEM Spor play their home matches at Hasan Türker Stadium in Atakent neighborhood of Karşıyaka district in Izmir.

== Statistics ==
As of 23 April 2016.

Season	League	Pos.	Pld	W	D	L	GF	GA	GD	Pts
2007–08	Women's League – Div. 1 Group D	5	8	0	0	8	3	54	−51	0
2008–09	Second League – Group 3	5	8	2	0	6	13	16	−3	6
2009–10	Regional League Group 2	2	10	6	0	4	32	30	+2	18
2010–11	Regional League Group Aegean	2	10	8	0	2	51	20	+31	24
2011–12	Second League – Group Aegean	1	6	4	1	1	37	8	+29	13
2012–13	Second League – Group 2	3	10	6	0	4	40	29	+11	18
2013–14	Second League Group 4	2	16	13	0	3	77	18	+59	39
2014-15	First League	9	18	4	1	13	22	69	−47	13
2015–16	Second League	11	22	5	2	15	26	64	−38	17
Green marks a season followed by promotion, red a season followed by relegation.

== Current squad ==
As of 23 April 2016

Head coach: (Turkey) Feriha Paylar

Note: Flags indicate national team as defined under FIFA eligibility rules; some limited exceptions apply. Players may hold more than one non-FIFA nationality.

No.	Pos.	Nation	Player
1	GK	TUR	Buse Sarıcı
11	GK	TUR	Begüm Dağ
47	MF	TUR	Sevgi Koç
35	FW	TUR	Melisa Göl
2		TUR	Pelin Işıl Işık
7		TUR	Dilan Çalışkan
9		TUR	Demet Dumrul
12		TUR	Gözde Urlu

No.	Pos.	Nation	Player
13		TUR	Hilal Saygın
14		TUR	Beste Altınelmalı
16		TUR	Zeynep Alma
17		TUR	Cansel Çetinkaya
27		TUR	Tuba Moral
28		TUR	Sadiye Aras
88		TUR	Elif Baş
99		TUR	Kıymet Güleç
