= Derince Belediyespor =

Derince Belediyespor Women's Football
- Full name: Derince Belediye Spor Kulübü
- Ground: Derince Belediye Stadium
- Coordinates: 38°23′48″N 27°04′33″E
- Chairman: Şahin Çavuşoğlu
- Manager: Hasan Alemdaroğlu
- League: Turkish Women's First Football League
- 2013–14: 3rd
Home colours

Derince Belediyespor Women's Football (Turkish: Derince Belediyespor Bayan Futbol Takımı) is the women's football team of the Turkish multi-sport club of Derince Belediyespor, a.k.a. Derince Spor A.Ş., based in Derince district of Kocaeli, Turkey.

== History ==
Derince Belediyespor entered the national competition in the Turkish Women's Second League's 2011–12 season playing in the Division Marmara A. The team was promoted to the Women's First League after defeating Marmara Üniversitesispor in the final match of the play-offs. In 2012–13, in their first season in the top women's league, they ranked 6th. The team finished the 2013–14 season in the third place ahead of Kdz. Ereğlispor.

Derince Belediyespor withdrew from the Women's First League one week before the beginning of the 2014–15 season and two days before the deadline of the footballer transfer term. They did not show at the scheduled first match against Adana İdmanyurduspor. They finished the season at the bottom of the league list without playing any game. Relegated to the Women's Second League, the team did not show up at any match of the 2015–16 season.

== Colors and badge ==
Derince Belediyespor's colors are navy and yellow. The club's badge features Turkish flag in the upper left quarter, and the striped club colors in the upper right quarter. The club's title is shown in the middle bar. The lower half is reserved for the club initials "db" with club's establishment year "1994" on the club colors navy-yellow.

== Stadium ==
The team play their home matches at the Derince Belediye Stadium. Its ground is covered by artificial turf.

== Statistics ==
As of 10 January 2016

Season	League	Pos.	Pld	W	D	L	GF	GA	GD	Pts
2011–12	Second League Div. Marmara A	1	13	11	2	0	50	12	+38	35
2012–13	First League	6	18	7	3	8	37	35	+2	24
2013–14	First League	3	20	8	3	9	26	32	−6	27
2014–15	First League	10	18	0	0	18	0	54	−54	−3
2015–16	Second League	10	10	0	0	10	0	30	−30	−3
Green marks a season followed by promotion, red a season followed by relegation.

== Honors ==
Turkish Women's Second Football League

- Winners: 2011–12

Turkish Women's First Football League

- Third places: 2013–14

== See also ==
- Turkish women in sports
