= Trabzon İdmanocağı (women's football) =

- Full name: Trabzon İdmanocağı Spor Kulübü
- Ground: Yavuz Selim Stadium
- Capacity: 1,820
- Coordinates: 41°00′14″N 39°42′24″E
- Chairman: Mehmet Öz
- Manager: Mustafa Keleş
- League: Turkish Women's First League
Away colours

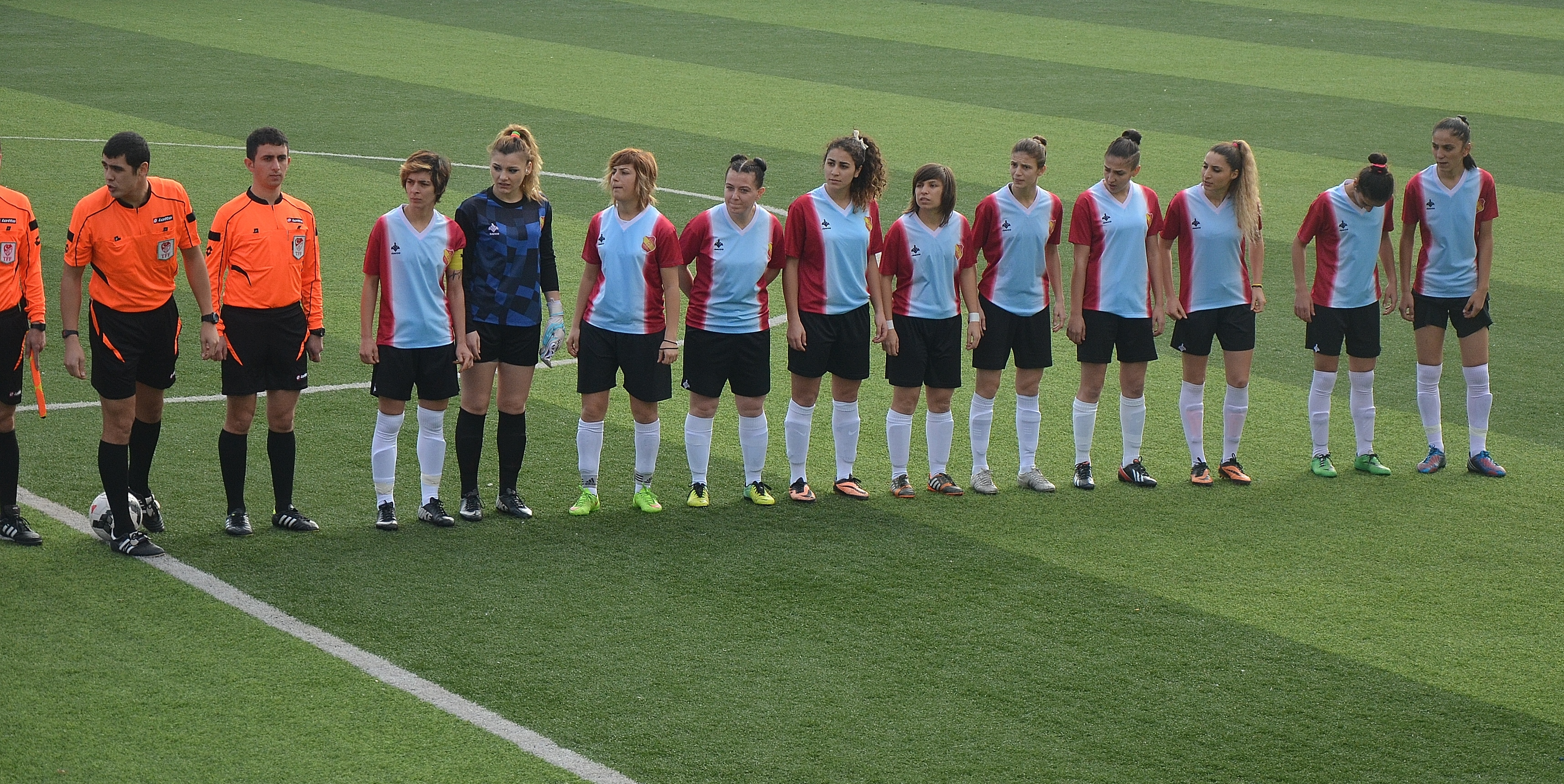
Trabzon İdmanocağı (women) squad in the 2014–15 season

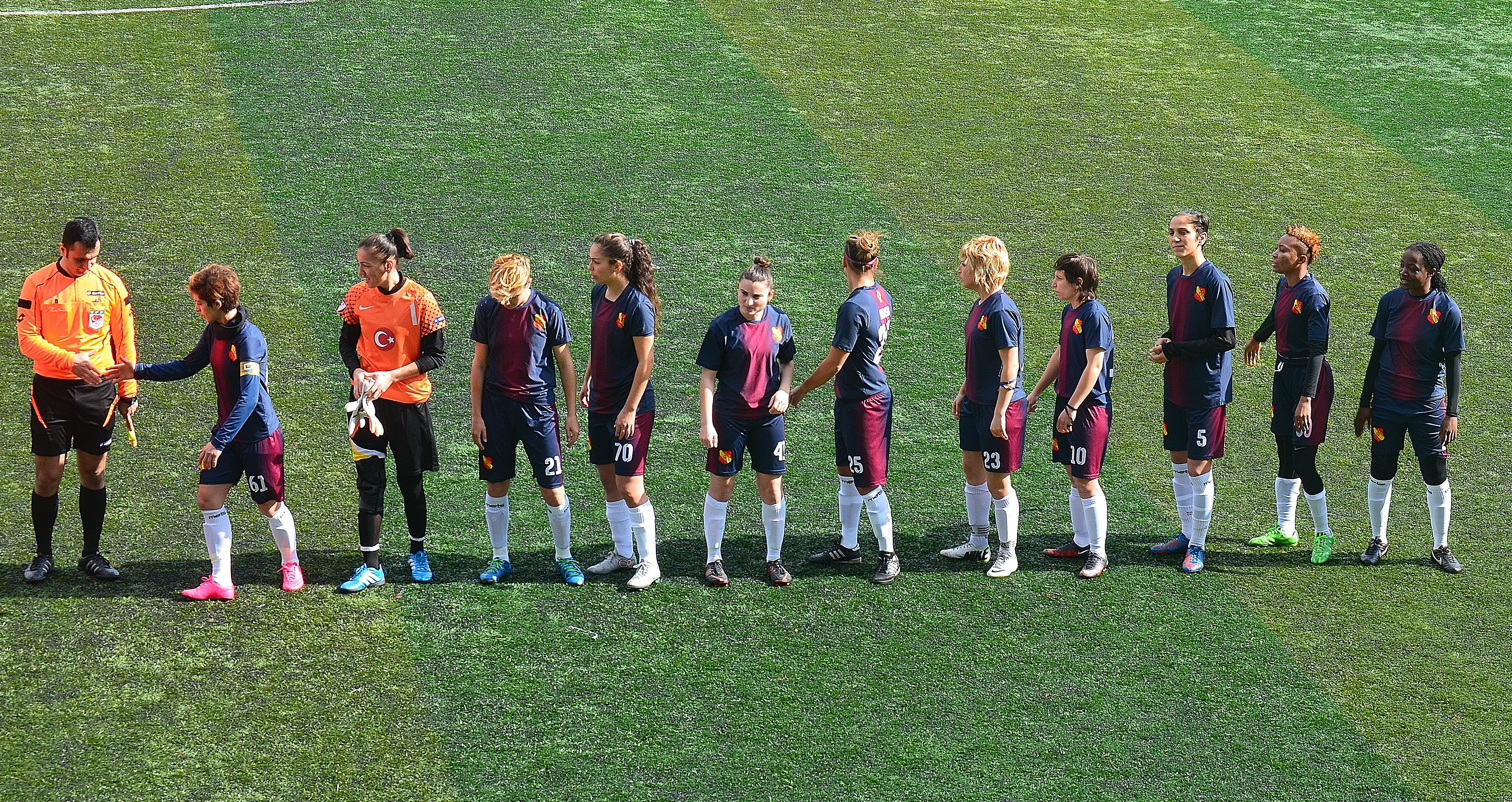
Trabzon İdmanocağı (women) squad in the 2015–16 season

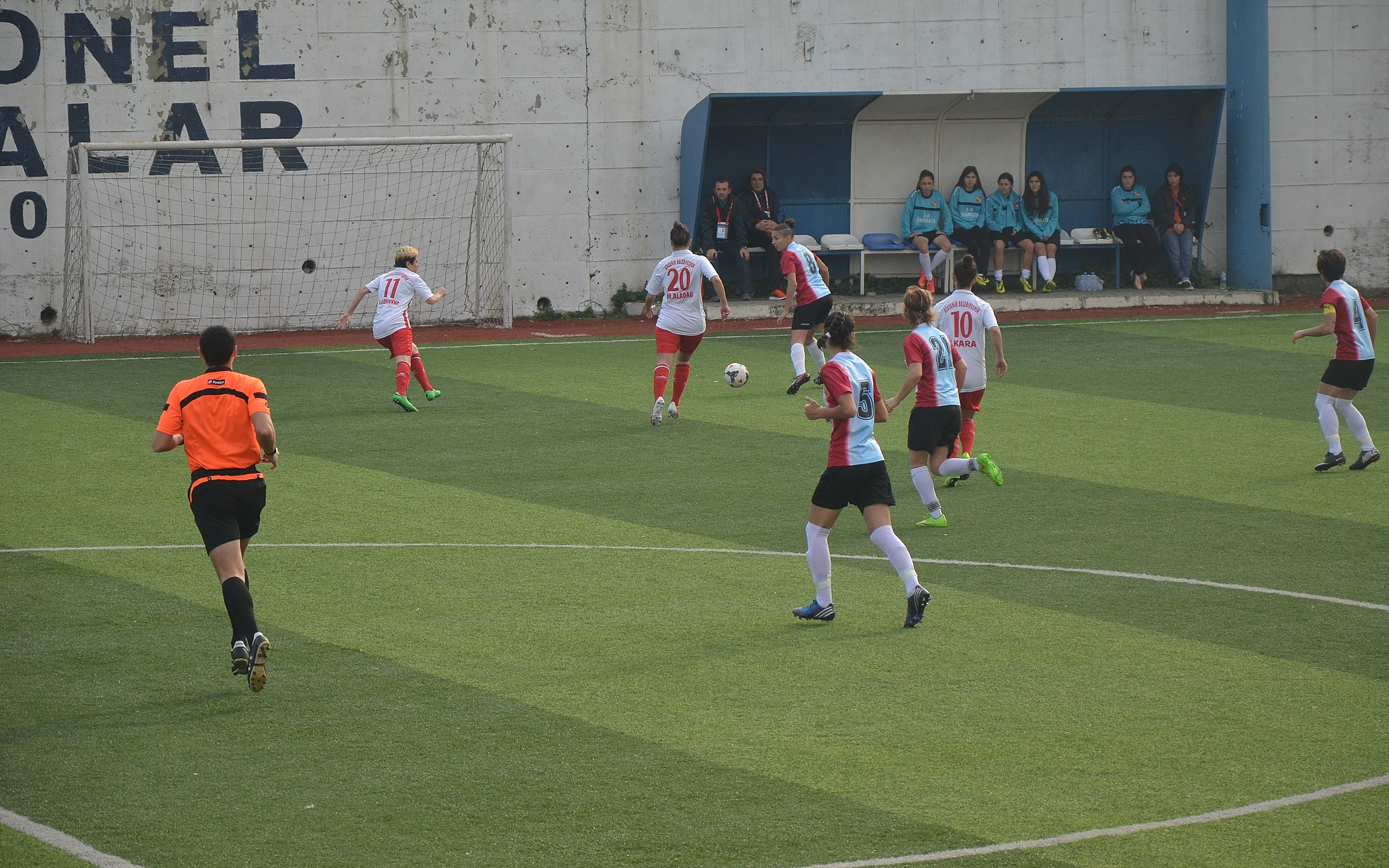
Trabzon İdmanocağı (women) against Ataşehir Belediyespor in the 2014–15 season's away match

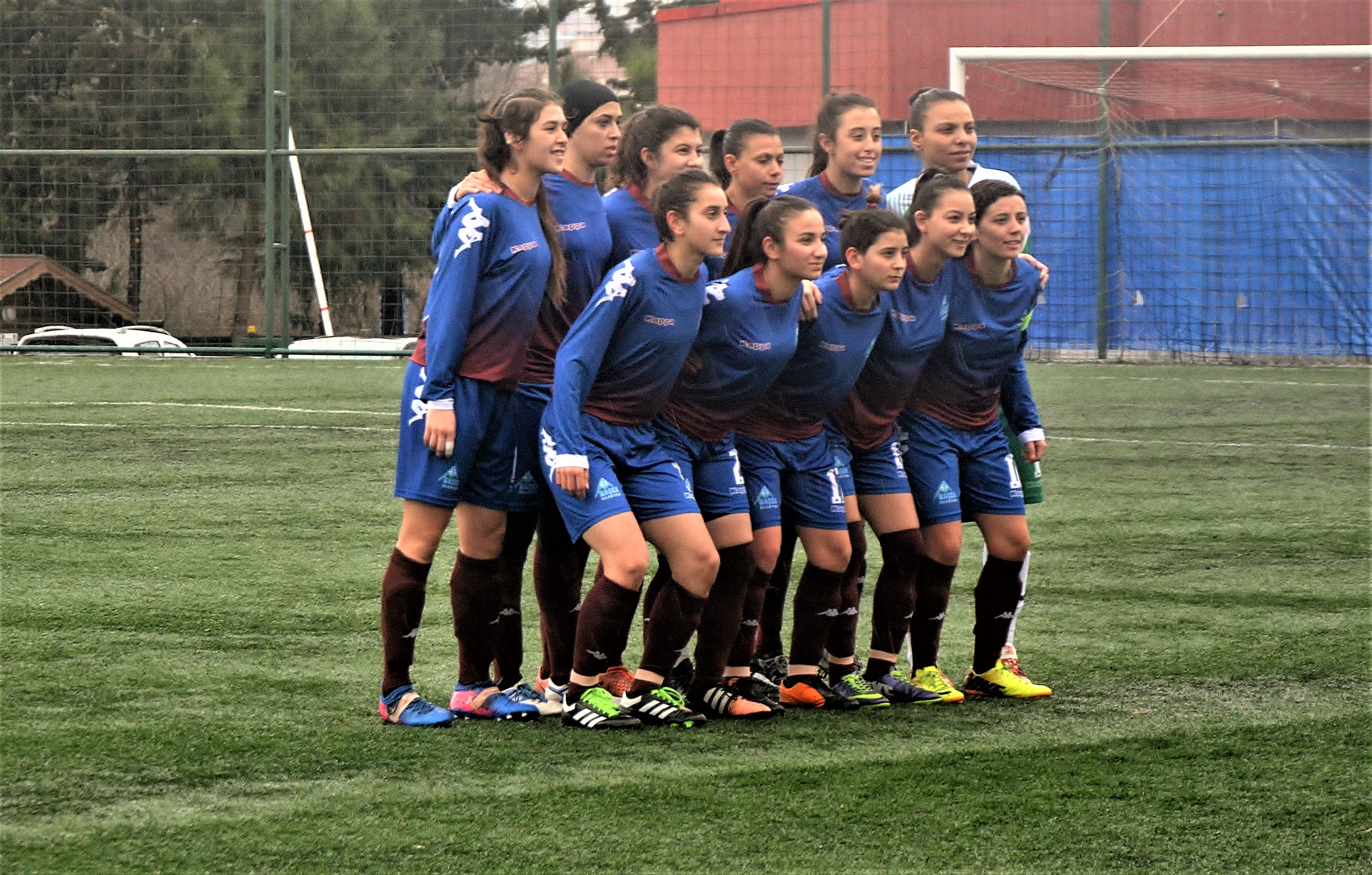
Trabzon İdmanocağı (women) squad in the 2015–16 season

Trabzon İdmanocağı is a professional women's football side of Trabzon İdmanocağı Spor Kulübü based in Trabzon, Turkey. The team plays in the Turkish Women's First Football League. They finished the 2011–12, 2014–15 and 2015–16 seasons at third place.

== History ==
The women's team of Trabzon İdmanocağı was established in the 2007–08 season, and played in the Women's Second League. At the end of the 2009–10 season, the team were promoted to the Women's First League. The team finished the 2011–12 season at third place.

In November 2017, the women's football section of Trabzon İdmanocağı club was transferred to the municipality of Maçka district in Trabzon Province for a period of three years. The team played the 2017-18 First League matches under their original name Trabzon İdmanocağı although officially they were named Maçka Belediyesi İdmanocağı. The team did not show up in any match of the 2018-19 First League season, officially finished the league at last position, and was so relegated.

== Colors and badge ==
The club colors are red and yellow. Club's badge features a football in the middle flanked by the club initials "T.I.O." and the foundation year "1921" on red-yellow diagonal colors.

People from Trabzon living outside of the city demanded that the women's team wear kits with the colors claret and blue, which are in fact the colors of the rival club in the city, the successful club Trabzonspor. The board of directors of the club chaired by Mehmet Öz concluded in the beginning of the 2014–15 league season to use the colors claret and blue in respect of the people originating from Trabzon and living in the major cities, where the women's team play away matches. Team manager Gürkan Çavdar notes from experience that this implementation fulfills the fans' longing.

The team finished the 2015–16 season at third rank again.

== Stadium ==
Trabzon İdmanocağı women's team play their home matches at Yavuz Selim Stadium in Trabzon. The venue has a seating capacity of 1,820 spectators. The ground is artificial turf.

== Statistics ==
As of 1 March 2020.

Season	League	Rank	Pld	W	D	L	GF	GA	GD	Pts
2007–08	Second League Div. C	4	8	2	0	6	18	22	−4	6
2008–09	Second League Div. 1	3	6	2	1	3	10	11	−1	7
2009–10	Second League	5	18	8	2	8	45	36	+9	26
2010–11	First League	8	22	6	5	11	32	43	−11	23
2011–12	First League	3	22	10	5	7	39	23	+16	35
2012–13	First League	4	18	11	2	5	46	19	+27	35
2013–14	First League	6	14	5	0	9	18	35	−17	15
2014–15	First League	3	18	14	0	4	41	18	+23	42
2015–16	First League	3	18	13	2	3	89	9	+80	41
2016–17	First League	4	26	12	4	10	51	36	+15	40
2017–18	First League	8	18	3	4	11	12	56	−44	13
2018–19	First League	10	18	0	0	18	0	54	−54	-3 ^{1})
2019–20	Second League	8 ^{2}	15	5	0	10	26	68	−42	15
Green marks a season followed by promotion, red a season followed by relegation.

- ^{1}): Three penalty points had been deducted in the beginning of the season for not showing up imposed by the Turkish Football Federation.
- ^{2}): Season discontinued due to COVID-19 pandemic in Turkey

== Former managers ==
- Abdülkadir Çelik
- Gürkan Çavdar
- Mustafa Keleş

== Honours ==
- Turkish Women's First Football League
  - Third places (2): 2011–12, 2014–15, 2015–16

== Kit history ==
2013–14 away	2014–15 home	2014–15 away	2015–16 home	2015–16 away
