= 2014–15 Turkish Women's First Football League =

Turkish Women's First Football League
- Season: 2014–15
- Champions: Konak Belediyespor
- Relegated: Karşıyaka BESEM Spor; Derince Belediyespor
- Matches: 91
- Goals: 372 (4.09 per match)
- Top goalscorer: (Romania) Cosmina Dușa (33 goals)
- All statistics correct as of 7 April 2017.

The 2014–15 season of the Turkish Women's First Football League is the 19th season of Turkey's premier women's football league. Konak Belediyespor is the champion of the season

== Teams ==
Location of teams in the 2014–15 season of Turkish Women's First Football League

Season 2014–15
Team	Hometown	2013/14 finish
Adana İdmanyurduspor	Adana	5th
Ataşehir Belediyespor	Istanbul	2nd
Derince Belediyespor	Kocaeli	3rd
Eskişehirspor	Eskişehir	Play-off winner, 2nd League
Gazikentspor	Gaziantep	Play-off winner, 2nd League
İlkadım Belediyesi	Samsun	Play-off winner, 2nd League
Kdz. Ereğlispor	Karadeniz Ereğli	4th
Karşıyaka BESEM Spor	İzmir	Play-off winner, 2nd League
Konak Belediyespor	İzmir	1st
Trabzon İdmanocağı	Trabzon	6th

== League table ==
Pos	Team	Pld	W	D	L	GF	GA	GD	Pts	Qualification or relegation
1	Konak Belediyespor	18	16	2	0	105	3	+102	50	Advance to Final
2	Ataşehir Belediyespor	18	16	2	0	69	9	+60	50	Advance to Final
3	Trabzon İdmanocağı	18	14	0	4	41	18	+23	42	
4	Adana İdmanyurduspor	18	10	1	7	33	23	+10	31	
5	Kdz. Ereğlispor	18	9	0	9	32	37	−5	27	
6	İlkadım Belediyesi	18	6	3	9	24	34	−10	21	
7	Eskişehirspor	18	4	3	11	26	55	−29	15	
8	Gazikentspor	18	4	2	12	18	68	−50	14	
9	Karşıyaka BESEM Spor	18	4	1	13	22	69	−47	13	Relegation to Second Football League
10	Derince Belediyespor (Note: Deducted 3 points)	18	0	0	18	0	54	−54	−3	Relegation to Second Football League

Updated to match(es) played on 7 April 2017. Source: Kadinlar 1. Ligi 2014-2015 Sezonu Fikstur ve Puan Cetveli TFF
Rules for classification: 1) Points

== Final ==
The final was played on 24 April 2015 at the İsmetpaşa Stadium in Kocaeli.

24 April 2015
14:00 EEST

Konak Belediyespor	2–0	Ataşehir Belediyespor
Yağmur Uraz 55'; Esra Erol 62'	Report

İsmetpaşa Stadium, Kocaeli
Referee: Enes Kanpara

== Results ==
Home \ Away	AIY	ATB	DER	ESK	GAZ	ILK	KDZ	KSK	KOB	TIO
Adana İdmanyurduspor	—	0–1	3–0	2–0	2–0	1–1	4–1	0–3	0–5	0–1
Ataşehir Belediyespor	3–1	—	3–0	5–1	9–0	4–0	2–1	13–1	0–0	2–1
Derince Belediyespor	0–3	0–3	—	0–3	0–3	0–3	0–3	0–3	0–3	0–3
Eskişehirspor	1–4	1–4	3–0	—	2–4	3–3	0–2	2–1	1–7	2–5
Gazikentspor	0–4	0–6	3–0	1–1	—	2–1	1–4	2–4	0–7	0–1
İlkadım Belediyesi	1–4	0–2	3–0	1–1	2–0	—	2–0	2–0	0–6	0–1
Kdz. Ereğlispor	0–2	0–5	3–0	3–2	2–0	3–0	—	2–0	0–9	1–2
Karşıyaka BESEM Spor	1–2	2–5	3–0	1–2	1–1	0–4	1–5	—	0–9	1–6
Konak Belediyespor	3–0	1–1	3–0	9–1	18–0	5–0	4–0	10–0	—	4–0
Trabzon İdmanocağı	2–1	0–1	3–0	3–0	4–1	2–1	3–2	4–0	0–2	—

Updated to match(es) played on 22 March 2015. Source: Kadınlar 1. Ligi 2014 - 2015 Sezonu
Legend: Blue = home team win; Yellow = draw; Red = away team win.

== Topscorers ==
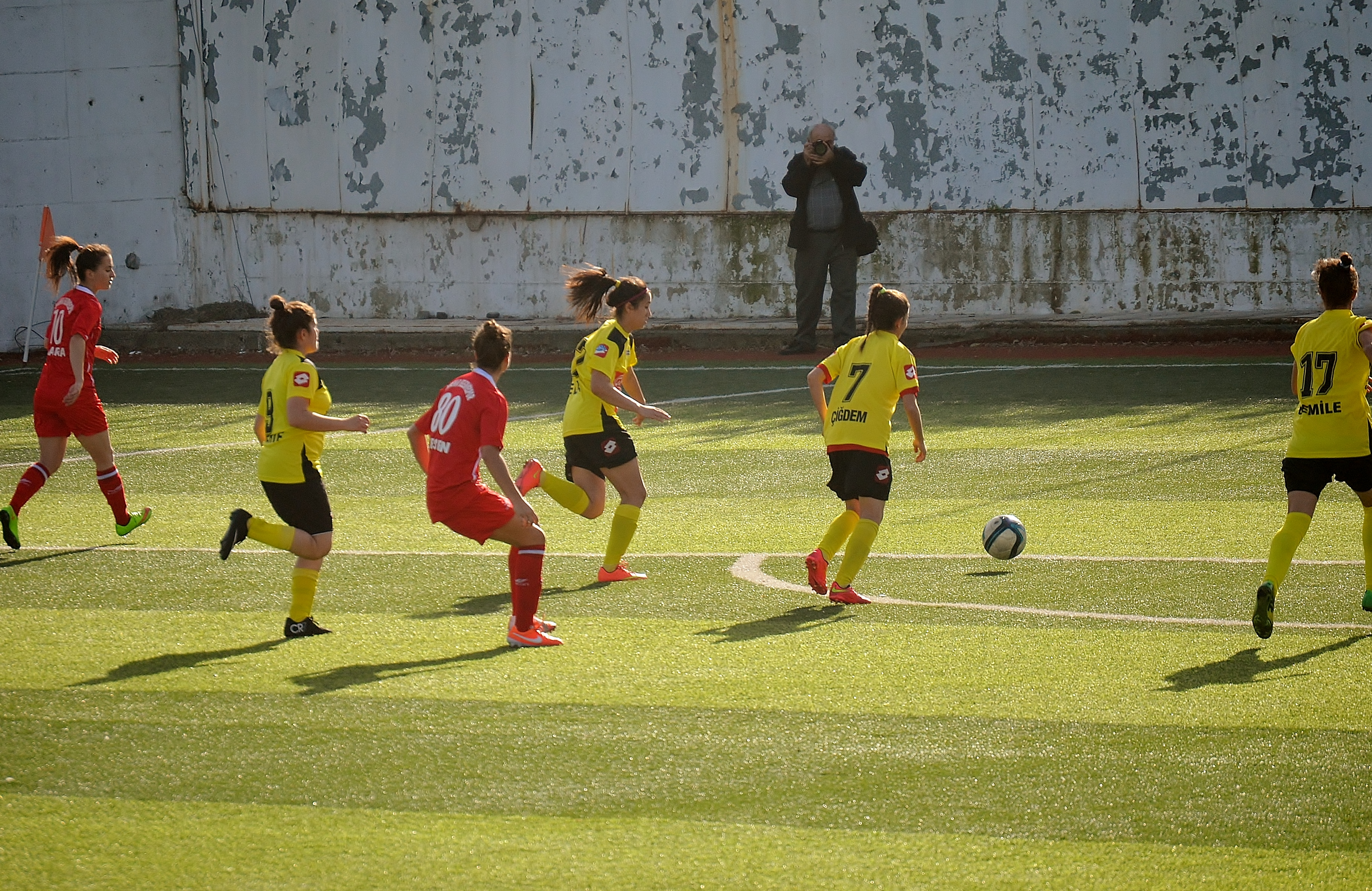
2014–15 season's match between Ataşehir Belediyespor and Gazikentspor

As of 25 April 2015.

Rank	Player	Club	Goals
1	(Romania) Cosmina Dușa	Konak Belediyespor	33
2	(Turkey) Ebru Topçu	Konak Belediyespor	18
3	(Turkey) Merve Aladağ	Ataşehir Belediyespor	17
4	(Turkey) Esra Solmaz	Trabzon İdmanocağı	11
4	(Georgia (country)) Tatiana Matveeva	Konak Belediyespor	11
6	(Georgia (country)) Lela Chichinadze	Adana İdmanyurdu	10
