= 2015–16 Turkish Women's First Football League =

Turkish Women's First Football League
- Season: 2015–16
- Champions: Konak Belediyespor
- Relegated: Gazikentspor; Eskişehirspor
- Matches: 90
- Goals: 503 (5.59 per match)
- Top goalscorer: (Turkey) (Germany) Arzu Karabulut (23 goals)
- All statistics correct as of 4 April 2017.

The 2015–16 season of the Turkish Women's First Football League was the 20th season of Turkey's premier women's football league. Konak Belediyespor was the champion of the season

== Teams ==
Location of teams in the 2015–16 season of Turkish Women's First Football League

Season 2015–16
Team	Hometown	2014/15 finish
1207 Antalya Muratpaşa Belediye Spor	Antalya	1st, 2. Ligi
Adana İdmanyurduspor	Adana	4th
Ataşehir Belediyespor	Istanbul	2nd
Eskişehirspor	Eskişehir	7th
Gazikentspor	Gaziantep	8th
İlkadım Belediyesi	Samsun	6th
Kdz. Ereğlispor	Karadeniz Ereğli	5th
Kireçburnu Spor	Istanbul	2nd, 2. Ligi
Konak Belediyespor	İzmir	1st
Trabzon İdmanocağı	Trabzon	3rd

== League table ==
Pos	Team	Pld	W	D	L	GF	GA	GD	Pts	Qualification or relegation
1	Konak Belediyespor (C)	18	16	0	2	91	16	+75	48	Qualification to Champions League qualifying round
2	Ataşehir Belediyespor	18	14	0	4	73	13	+60	42	
3	Trabzon İdmanocağı	18	13	2	3	89	9	+80	41	
4	1207 Antalya Muratpaşa Belediye Spor	18	12	2	4	53	12	+41	38	
5	Kireçburnu Spor	18	10	2	6	65	20	+45	32	
6	Kdz. Ereğlispor	18	7	0	11	54	45	+9	21	
7	Adana İdmanyurduspor	18	6	2	10	41	51	−10	20	
8	İlkadım Belediyesi	18	5	2	11	22	51	−29	17	
9	Gazikentspor	18	2	0	16	7	95	−88	6	Relegation to Second Football League
10	Eskişehirspor (Note: Deducted 3 points)	18	0	0	18	8	191	−183	−3	Relegation to Second Football League

Updated to match(es) played on 4 April 2017. Source: Kadinlar 1. Ligi 2015–2016 Sezonu Fikstur ve Puan Cetveli TFF
Rules for classification: 1) Points
(C) Champions

== Results ==
Home \ Away	1207	AIY	ATB	ESK	GAZ	ILK	KDZ	KRC	KOB	TIO
1207 Antalya Muratpaşa Belediye Spor	—	5–0	0–2	9–0	9–0	0–0	6–1	1–1	0–2	0–1
Adana İdmanyurduspor	0–2	—	0–3	12–1	4–0	2–1	5–1	1–3	0–6	1–1
Ataşehir Belediyespor	1–0	5–1	—	18–0	13–0	0–3	1–0	2–1	2–1	0–1
Eskişehirspor	0–4	1–8	0–14	—	0–2	1–5	0–14	1–13	1–11	0–16
Gazikentspor	0–2	0–1	0–2	1–0	—	1–2	1–2	0–11	1–4	0–8
İlkadım Belediyesi Yabancılar Pazarı Spor	0–3	4–4	0–4	3–0	2–1	—	1–2	1–2	0–5	0–6
Kdz. Ereğlispor	2–4	3–2	0–2	15–2	8–0	3–0	—	0–1	0–5	0–4
Kireçburnu Spor	0–1	3–0	1–2	10–0	11–0	2–0	3–0	—	1–2	1–1
Konak Belediyespor	0–4	4–0	3–1	17–1	8–0	9–0	5–3	6–1	—	2–1
Trabzon İdmanocağı	2–3	8–0	2–1	19–0	8–0	6–0	3–0	2–0	0–1	—

Updated to match(es) played on 28 March 2016. Source: Kadınlar 1. Ligi 2015 – 2016 Sezonu
Legend: Blue = home team win; Yellow = draw; Red = away team win.

== Topscorers ==
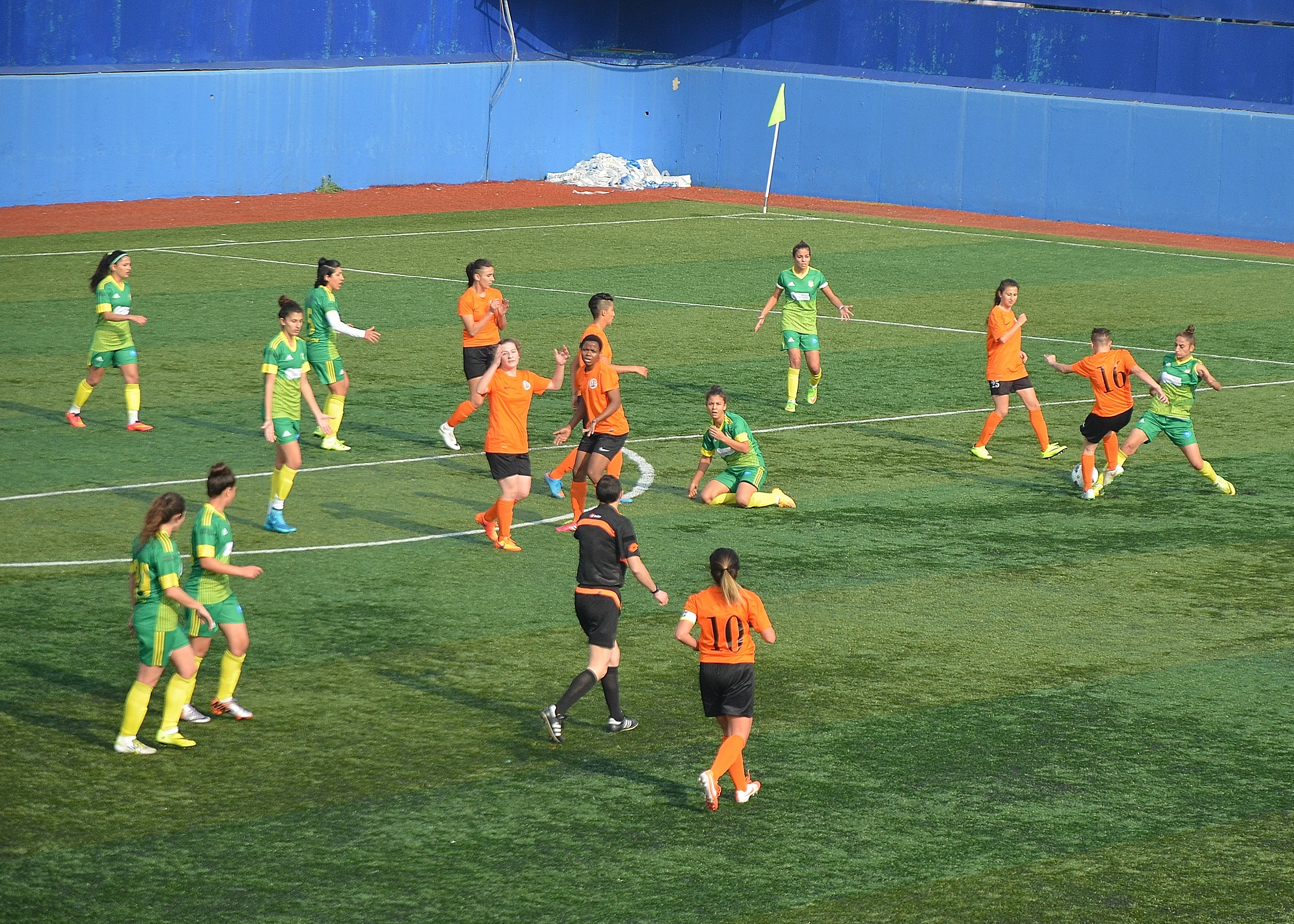
2015–16 season's match between Kireçburnu Spor and 1207 Antalaya Muratpaşa Belediyespor.

As of 27 March 2016.

Rank	Player	Club	Goals
1	(Turkey) (Germany) Arzu Karabulut	Trabzon İdmanocağı	23
2	(Romania) Cosmina Dușa	Konak Belediyespor	20
3	(Turkey) Hatice Bahar Özgüvenç	Ataşehir Belediyespor	18
3	(Georgia (country)) Lela Chichinadze	Ataşehir Belediyespor	18
5	(Turkey) Ceren Nurlu	Konak Belediyespor	17
5	(Turkey) Sevgi Çınar	Konak Belediyespor	17
7	(Cameroon) Jacquette Ada	1207 Antalyaspor	15
7	(Georgia (country)) Khatia Tchkonia	Karadeniz Ereğlispor	15
9	(Turkey) Esra Erol	Kireçburnu Spor	12
9	(Turkey) Yağmur Uraz	Kireçburnu Spor	12
11	(Turkey) Emine Gümüş	Adana İdmanyurdu	10
11	(Turkey) Seval Kıraç	Ataşehir Belediyespor	10
