= Eskişehirspor (women) =

Eskişehirspor Women's Football
- Full name: Eskişehirspor Kadın Futbol Takımı
- Nickname: Es Es
- Founded: 2009
- Ground: Vali Hanefi Demirkol Stadium
- Coordinates: 39°47′55″N 30°31′15″E
- Chairman: Mesut Hoşcan
- Manager: Selçuk Şahiner
- League: Turkish Women's Second Football League
- 2013–14: 1st
| Home colours | Away colours |

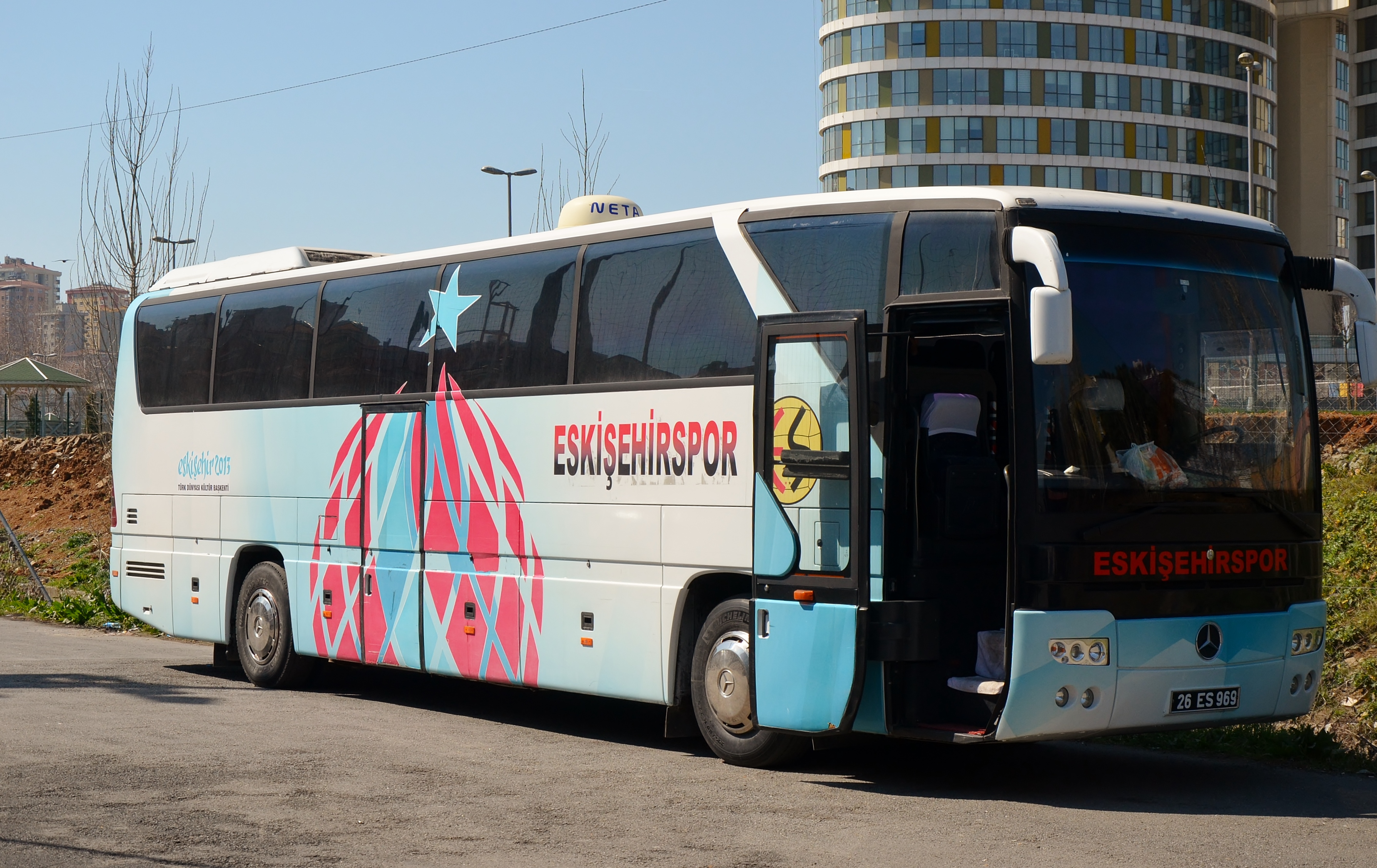
Club bus of Eskişehirspor.

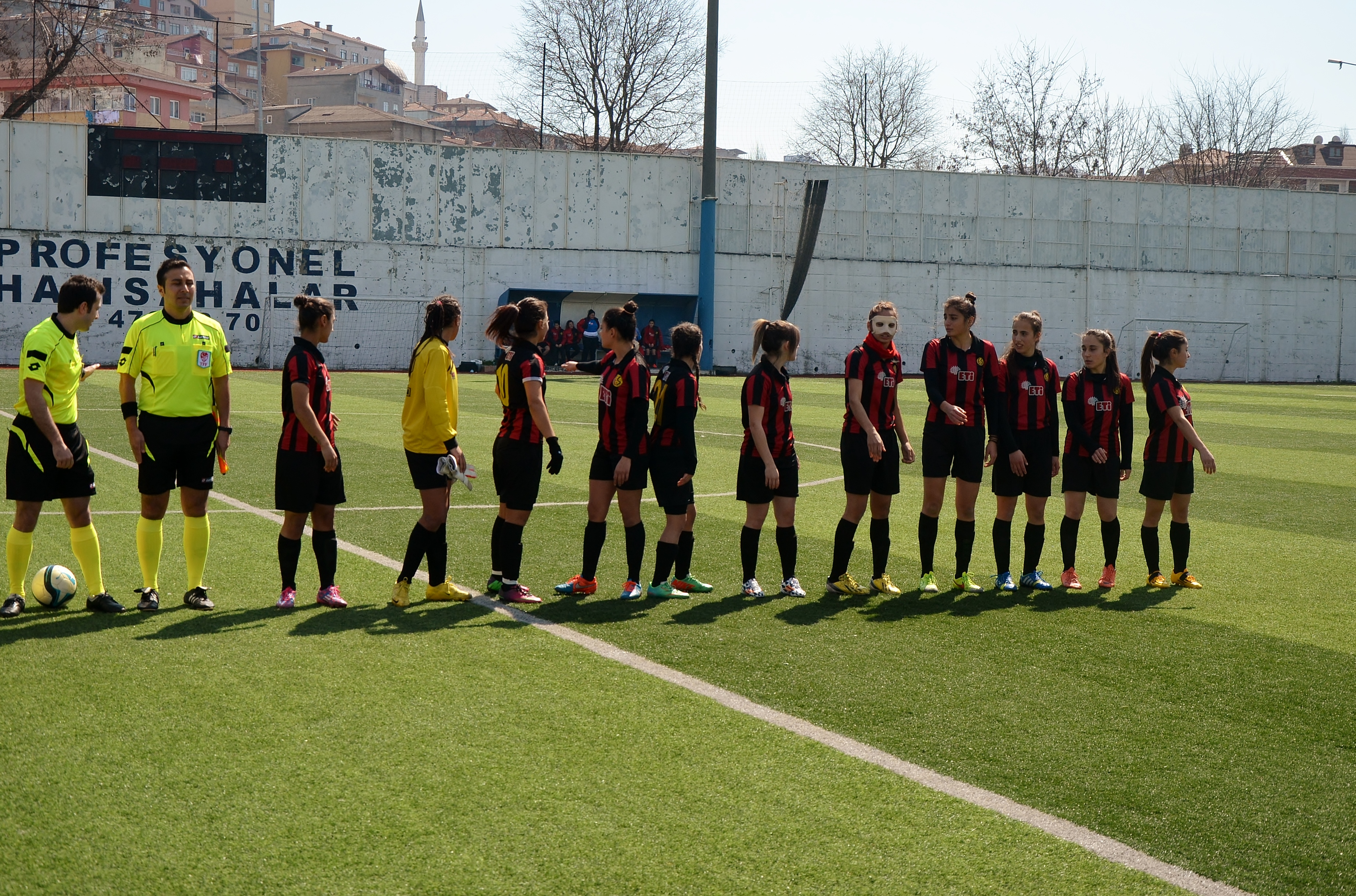
Eskişehirspor squad at the away match against Ataşehir Belediyespor in the 2014–15 season.

Eskişehirspor Women's Football (Turkish: Eskişehirspor Kadın Futbol Takımı) is the women's football team of the Turkish multi-sport club of Eskişehirspor based in Eskişehir,

== History ==
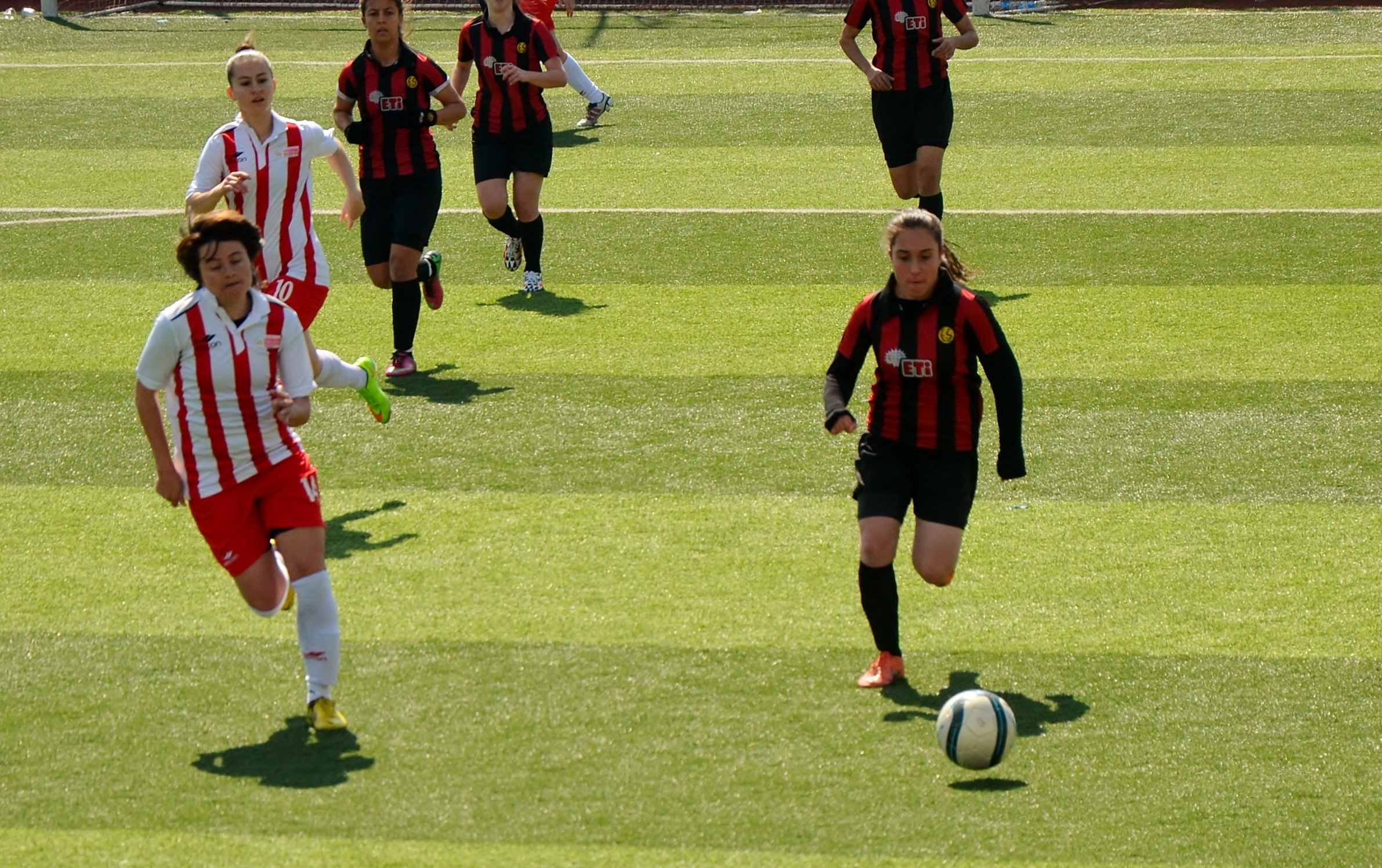
Eskişehirspor attacking Ataşehir Belediyespor in the away match of the 2014–15 season.

Eskişehirspor entered the national competition in the Turkish Women's Regional League's 2009–10 season playing in the Division 3. At the end of their second season in the Regional League, the team was promoted to the Turkish Women's Second League. The team finished the 2011–12 season in the Central Anatolia Division of the Second League as runners-up, and was promoted to the Turkish Women's First Football League. At the end of the 2012–13 season, Eskişehir women landed at the bottom of the team list, and was relegated to the Second League. The team was successful in the 2013–14 season, and finished the league as winner after winning the play-off matches. The team played the 2014–15 season again in the First League, and finished at 7th place.

== Colors and badge ==
Eskişehirspor's colors are black, red and yellow. The club's badge features a yellow football with the red-colored letter "E" for the hometown "Eskişehir" and the black-colored letter "S" for "Spor" flanking the main club's foundation year of 1965.

== Stadium ==
The team play their home matches at the Vali Hanefi Demirkol Stadium.

== Statistics ==
As of 20 February 2016.

| Season | League | Pos. | Pld | W | D | L | GF | GA | GD | Pts |
|---|---|---|---|---|---|---|---|---|---|---|
| 2009–10 | Regional League Div. 3 | 6 | 10 | 1 | 2 | 7 | 10 | 41 | −31 | 5 |
| 2010–11 | Regional League Div. Anatolia | 4 | 10 | 3 | 2 | 5 | 15 | 19 | −4 | 11 |
| 2011–12 | Second League Div. Central Anatolia | 2 | 13 | 10 | 2 | 1 | 54 | 10 | +44 | 32 |
| 2012–13 | First League | 10 | 18 | 0 | 1 | 17 | 10 | 93 | −83 | 1 |
| 2013–14 | Second League Div. 1 | 1 | 14 | 12 | 1 | 1 | 93 | 7 | +86 | 37 |
| 2014–15 | First League | 7 | 18 | 4 | 3 | 11 | 26 | 55 | −29 | 15 |
| 2015–16 | First League | 10 | 14 | 0 | 0 | 14 | 7 | 166 | −159 | 0 |
Green marks a season followed by promotion, red a season followed by relegation.

== Current squad ==
As of 7 May 2020.

Head coach: (Turkey) Ali Ersoy

Note: Flags indicate national team as defined under FIFA eligibility rules; some limited exceptions apply. Players may hold more than one non-FIFA nationality.

| No. | Pos. | Nation | Player |
|---|---|---|---|
| 1 | GK | TUR | Elif Nur Özer |
| 2 | DF | TUR | Gözde Kalyon |
| 3 | DF | TUR | Meryem Kaynar |
| 4 | DF | TUR | Serpşl Yılmaz |
| 5 | FW | TUR | Buse Nur Toraman |
| 8 | FW | TUR | Fatma Çaprak |
| 9 | FW | TUR | Zühal Çabuk |

| No. | Pos. | Nation | Player |
|---|---|---|---|
| 6 | | TUR | Merve Kaynar |
| 7 | | TUR | Sümeyra Yılmaz |
| 11 | | TUR | Elanur Mandacı |
| 12 | | TUR | İlayda Seçilir |
| 13 | | TUR | Neslihan Gülhan |
| 14 | | TUR | Gizem Yaşar |
| 16 | | TUR | Kader Bayram |
| 18 | | TUR | Fatmanur Güven |

== Honours ==
Turkish Women's Second Football League

- Winners (1): 2013–14
- Runners-up (1): 2011–12
