= Henriette Akaba =

Cameroonian footballer (born 1992)

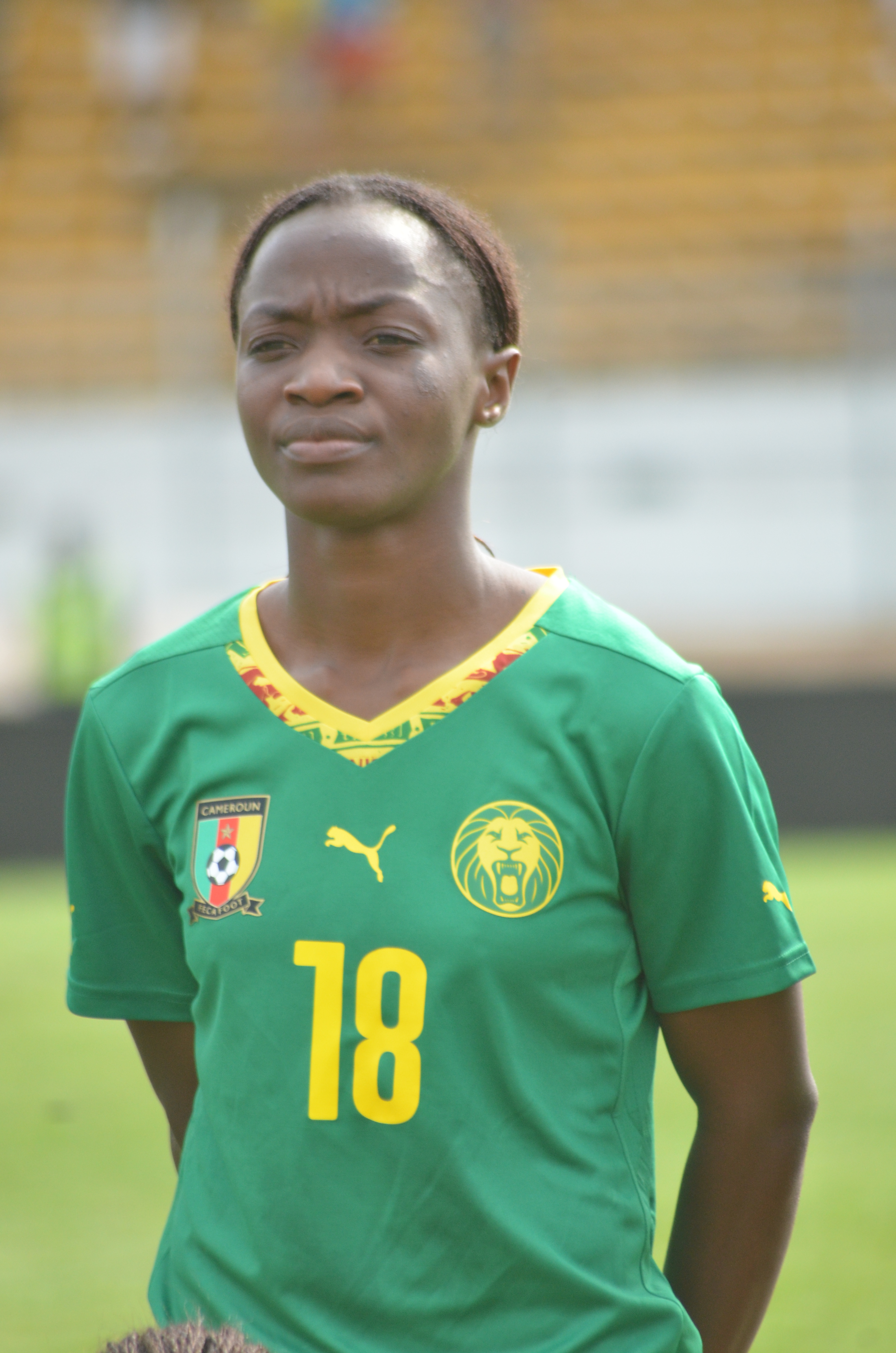
- Akaba representing Cameroon in July 2015

Personal information
- Full name: Henriette Michèle Akaba Edoa
- Date of birth: 7 June 1992 (age 34)
- Place of birth: Yaoundé, Cameroon
- Height: 1.65 m (5 ft 5 in)
- Position: Forward

Youth career
- Amazone FC

Senior career*
Years	Team	Apps	(Gls)
2008–2009	Lorient Yaoundé		
2010	Bangkokthonburi SC		
2010–2011	Canon Yaoundé		
2011	Louves Minproff		
2012	FC Energy Voronezh		
2012–2015	Lorema FC		
2015–2017	Trabzon İdmanocağı	30	(11)
2018	Ataşehir Belediyespor	11	(8)
2019	Beşiktaş	6	(2)
2020	Minsk	5	(2)
2021	Soyaux	5	(1)
2021–2022	Santa Teresa	27	(0)
2022	Levante Las Planas		
2023	ALG Spor	8	(0)
2023–2024	Ataşehir Belediyespor	20	(1)
2024	Al-Riyadh		

International career
	Cameroon	66	(0)
- * Club domestic league appearances and goals

Henriette Michèle Akaba Edoa (born 7 June 1992), shortly Henriette Akaba, or Michèle Akaba, is a Cameroonian professional footballer, who plays as a forward for the Cameroon women's national team.

== Club career ==
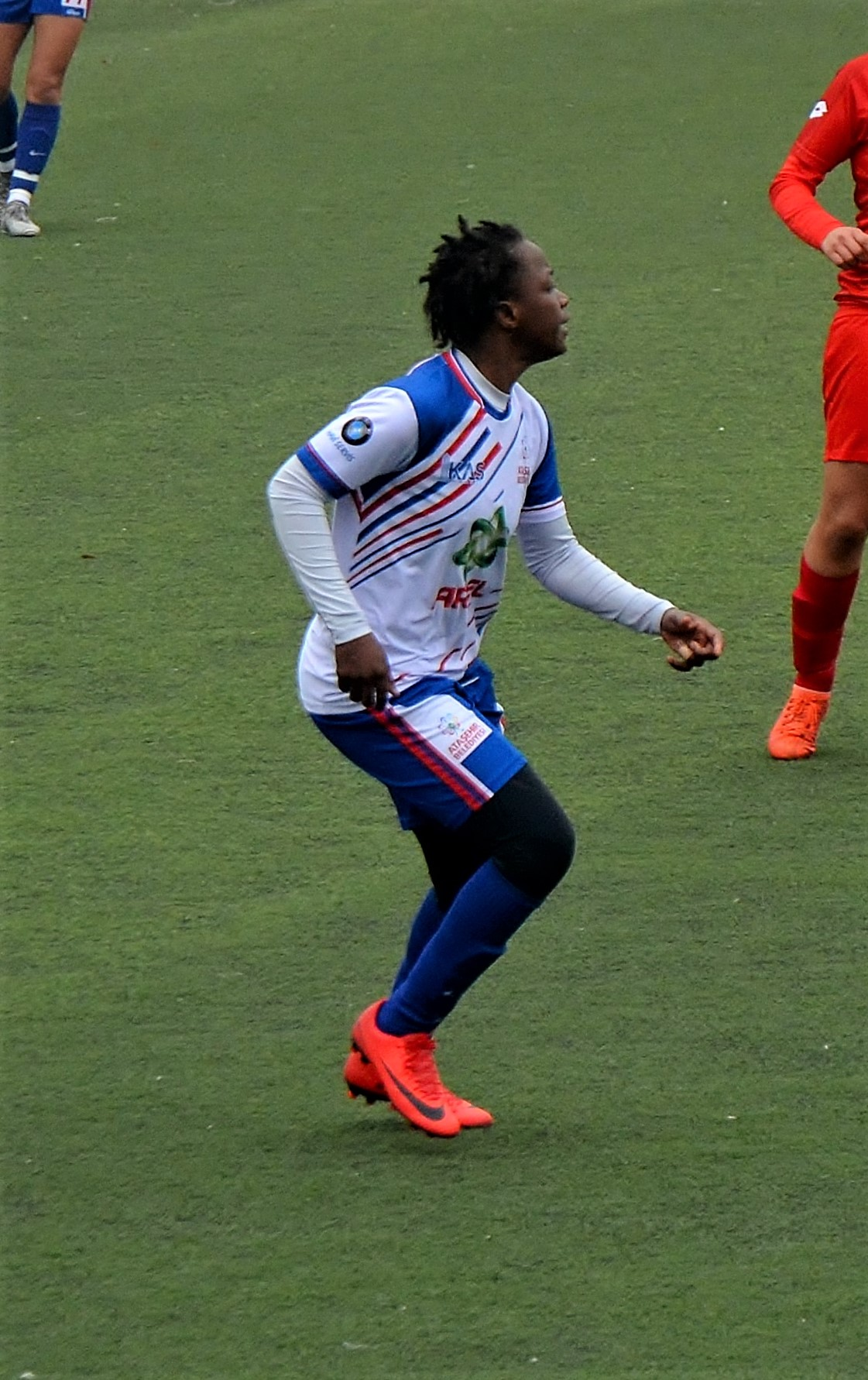
Henriette Akaba of Ataşehir Belediyespor in the 2017–18 Turkish Women's First League

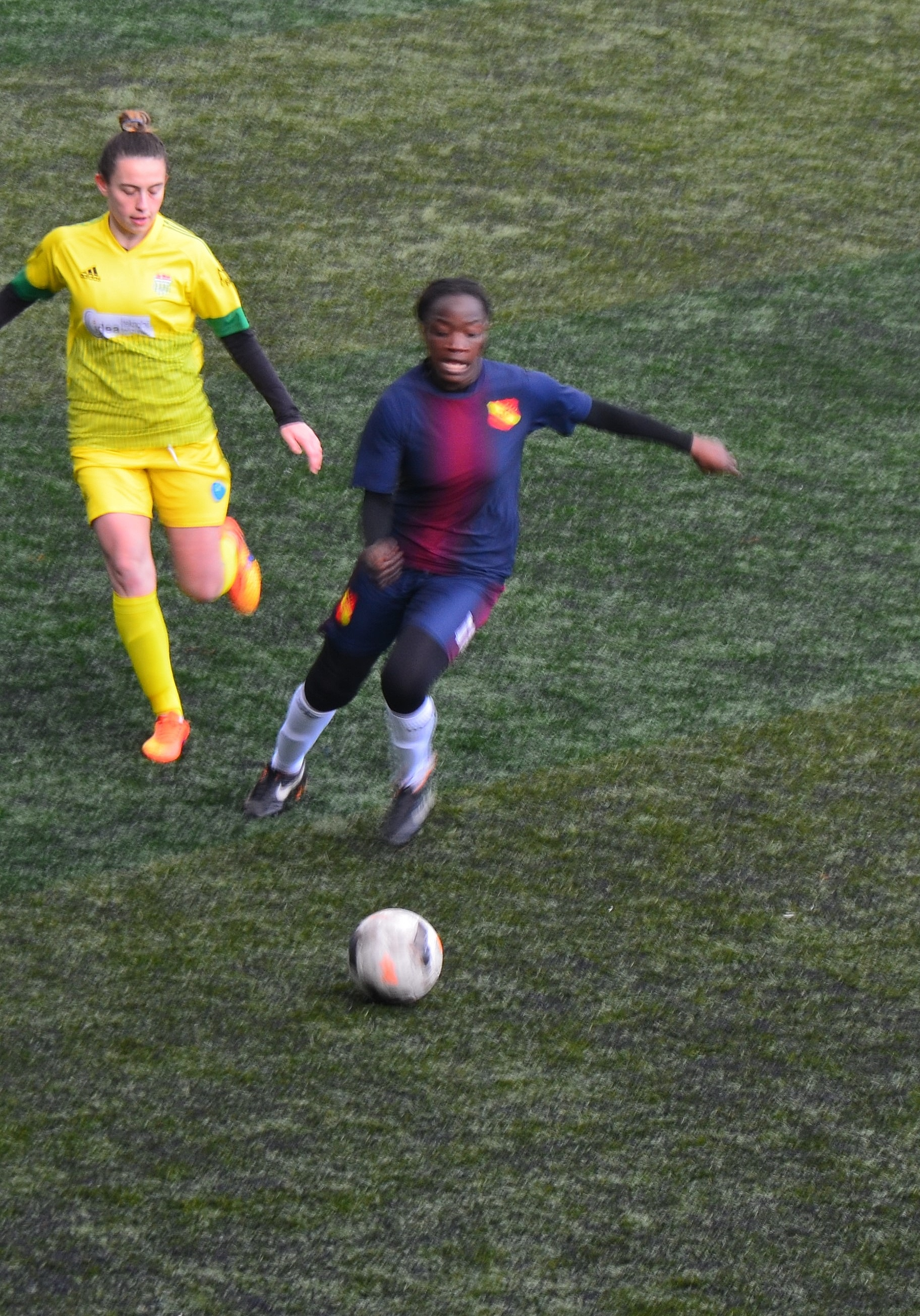
Henriette Akaba playing for Trabzon İdmanocagı in the 2015–16 season's away match against Kireçburnu Spor.

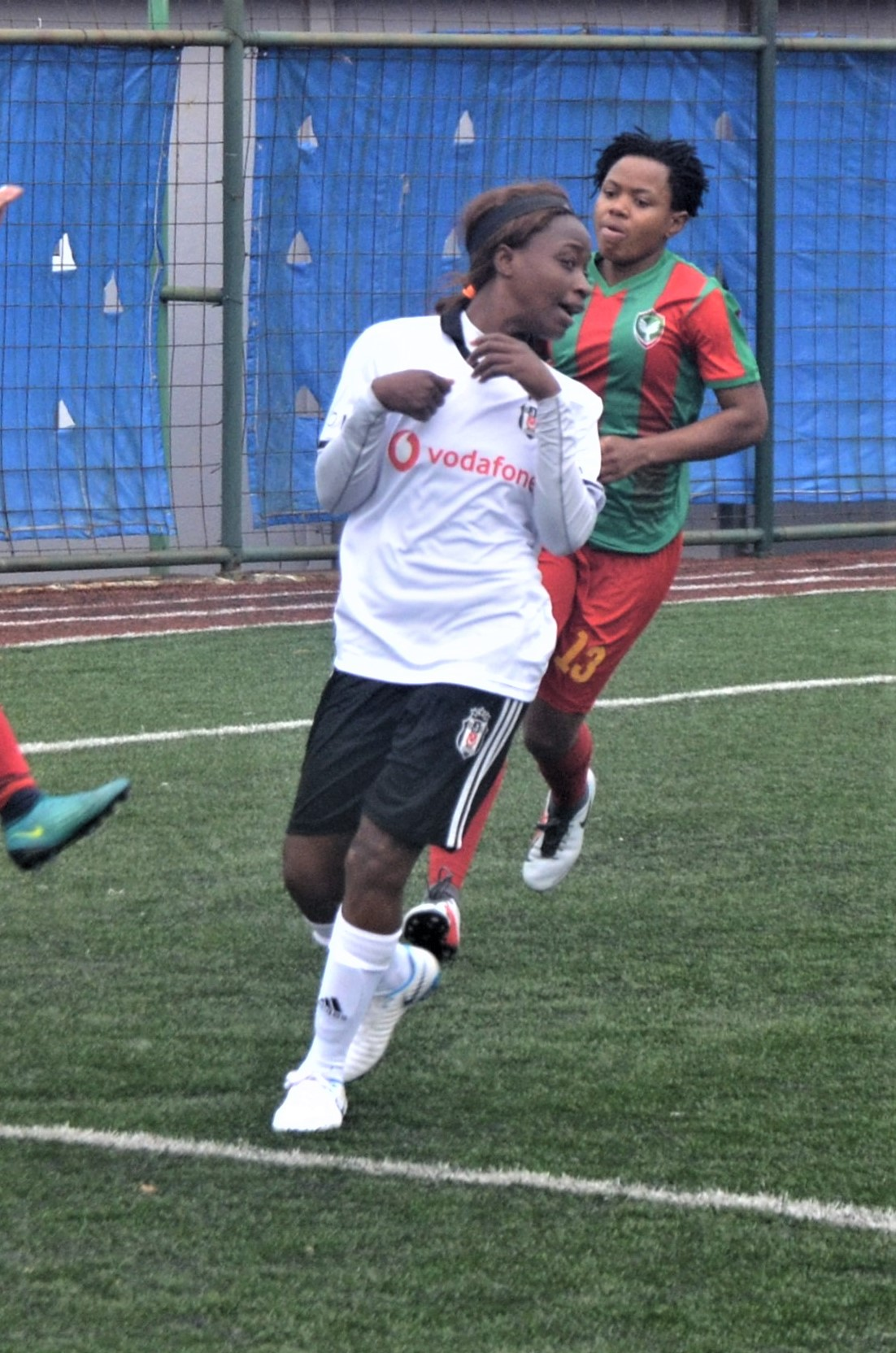
Henriette Akaba (white/black) of Beşiktaş J.K. in the 2018–19 Turkish Women's First League's home match against Amed S.K.

Akaba began her football career with Amazone FC in her hometown in Cameroon. In Spring 2008, she went to the rival Lorient FC Yaoundé, where she debuted as a senior player in the Ligue 2. After two and half years, she moved to Thailand in Spring 2010 to play for Bangkokthonburi SC in the Thailandish Women's First League. After one year, she returned home, and signed with Canon Yaoundé. In November 2011, Akaba joined Louves Minproff de Yaoundé. In Spring 2012, she moved to Russia to play for FC Energy Voronezh in the 2011–12 UEFA Women's Champions League. After only a half year, she returned to her country in June 2012, and joined Lorema FC Filles De Yaoundé.

End 2015, Akaba moved to Turkey, and was transferred on 4 December by Trabzon İdmanocağı, which competes in the Women's First League. She scored already one goal for her new team in the home match against Kireçburnu Spor two days later.

In October 2017, Akaba signed a two-year contract with the Istanbul-based club Ataşehir Belediyespor effective 2 January 2018. She participation at the 2018–19 UEFA Women's Champions League qualifying round. She scored one goal each in all three matches she played. In the 2018–19 league season, she transferred to Beşiktaş J.K.

In February 2023, she moved again to Turkey, and signed with the Gaziantep-based club ALG Spor to play in the second half of the 2022–23 Super League season.

In the 2023-24 Turkish Super League season, she was again with Ataşehir Belediyespor from Istanbul.

International goals
Date	Venue	Opponent	Competition	Result	Scored
Ataşehir Beledyespor
7 August 2018	III. Kerületi TVE Stadion, Budapest, Hungary	(Czech Republic) SK Slavia Prague	2018–19 UEFA Women's Champions League	L 2–7	1
10 August 2018	Hidegkúti Nándor Stadion, Budapest, Hungary	(Hungary) MTK Hungária FC	2018–19 UEFA Women's Champions League	D 2–2	1
13 August 2018	III. Kerületi TVE Stadion, Budapest, Hungary	(Kosovo) KFF Mitrovica	2018–19 UEFA Women's Champions League	W 6–1	1

== International career ==
Akaba is a member of the Cameroon women's national football team, nicknamed the "Indomitable Lionesses". She took part in women's football tournament at the 2012 Summer Olympics, in 2015 FIFA Women's World Cup Group C and in 2019 FIFA Women's World Cup Group E. She capped 66 times for the national team.

== Career statistics ==
As of match played 5 May 2024.

Club	Season	League			Continental		National		Total	
Club	Season	Division	Apps	Goals	Apps	Goals	Apps	Goals	Apps	Goals
Trabzon İdmanocağı	2015–16	First League	12	4	–	–			12	4
Trabzon İdmanocağı	2016–17	First League	18	7	–	–			18	7
Trabzon İdmanocağı	Total		30	11	–	–			30	11
Ataşehir Belediyespor	2017–18	First League	11	8	–	–	0	0	11	8
Ataşehir Belediyespor	2018–19	First League	0	0	3	3	0	0	3	3
Ataşehir Belediyespor	Total		11	8	3	3			14	11
Beşiktaş J.K.	2018–19	First League	6	2	-	-			6	2
Beşiktaş J.K.	Total		6	2	-	-			6	2
ALG Spor	2022–23	Super League	8	0	-	-			8	0
ALG Spor	Total		8	0	-	-			8	0
Ataşehir Belediyespor	2023–24	Super League	20	1	-	-			20	1
Ataşehir Belediyespor	Total		20	1	-	-			20	1

== Honours ==
Turkish Women's First Football League

Trabzon İdmanocağı (women)
Third places (1): 2015–16

Ataşehir Belediyespor
Winners (1): 2017–18
