= Carine Yoh =

Cameroonian footballer (born 1993)

Personal information
- Full name: Carine Mbuh Ndoum Yoh
- Date of birth: 10 April 1993 (age 33)
- Place of birth: Bamenda, Cameroon
- Height: 1.56 m (5 ft 1 in)
- Position: Midfielder

Senior career*
Years	Team	Apps	(Gls)
2010	Gentile Ladies Bamenda		
2011–2012	Ecole Franck Rohliceck de Douala		
2012–2013	Panthère Security de Garoua		
2013–2015	Confluence Queens FC		
2016	Ataşehir Belediyespor	5	(1)

International career
- Cameroon
- * Club domestic league appearances and goals as of 27 March 2016

Carine Mbuh Ndoum Yoh (born 10 April 1993) is a Cameroonian football forward last played in the Turkish Women's First Football League for Ataşehir Belediyespor and the Cameroonian national team. The 1.56 m (5 ft 1 in) tall sportswoman plays in the midfield position.

== Playing career ==
=== Club ===
In 2010, Yoh played for her hometown club Gentile Ladies Bamenda. The next season, she joined Ecole Franck Rohliceck de Douala.

Yoh was transferred in the 2013–14 season by the Nigerian club Confluence Queens FC from Panthère Security de Garoua in Cameroon to play in the Nigeria Women Premier League.

In January 2016, she left her Lokoja-based club to move to Turkey for Ataşehir Belediyespor, which play in the Turkish Women's First Football League.

=== International ===
In 2010, 2012 and again in 2014, she was admitted to the Cameroon women's national football team.

== Career statistics ==
As of 27 March 2016.

Club	Season	League			Continental		National		Total	
Club	Season	Division	Apps	Goals	Apps	Goals	Apps	Goals	Apps	Goals
Ataşehir Belediyespor	2015–16	First League	5	1	–	–	0	0	5	1
Ataşehir Belediyespor	Total		5	1	–	–	0	0	5	1
