= Ataşehir Belediyespor =

- Full name: Ataşehir Belediyesi Spor Kulübü
- Founded: 2007; 19 years ago
- Ground: Yenisahra Stadium
- Coordinates: 40°59′33″N 29°05′19″E
- Chairman: Abdullah Der
- Manager: Levent Avcı
- League: Turkish Women's Super League
- 2023–24: 14th
Home colours	Away colours

Ataşehir Belediyespor is a Turkish sports club based in the Ataşehir district of Istanbul. It is known for its women's football team that won the Turkish championship in 2011, in the fourth year of its existence. They defended their title successfully in 2012.

== History ==
The women's team was founded as a high school team, Ümraniye Mevlana Lisesi SK, in 2007. The team was promoted at the end of their first season in the Women's Regional League to the Women's Second League. The next season, they were able to ascend to the Women's First League. The girls became champion in the Junior Women's League also the same year. Representing Turkey at the World Intercollegiate Football Championship held in Antalya, the high school team placed seventh.

The club with financial problems was purchased by the newly established Ataşehir Municipality. The club was renamed Ateşehir Belediyesi Spor Kulübü in the summer of 2009. They first participated in the national league season 2009–10, ending the season in third place.

In the 2010–11 season, the team won the championship three weeks before the end. The women's team represented Turkey in the 2011–12 UEFA Women's Champions League, and also in the 2012–13 UEFA Women's Champions League.

Ataşehir Belediyespor competed in the Group 4 of the qualifying round of the 2011–12 UEFA Champions League, lost two and drew one match finishing at third place without advancing to the knockout stage. In the 2012–13 UEFA Champions League, they played in the Group 1, lost two matches and won one match that resulted in the third rank. They were not able to advance further again.

Ataşehir Belediyespor women finished the 2012–13 and 2013–14 seasons runner-up behind Konak Belediyespor. Even though Ataşehir Belediyespor finished the 2014–15 season undefeated and with the same point as Konak Belediyespor, they lost the play-off game and became again runner-up.

The team finished the 2015–16 season as runner-up fourth time in a row. In September 2016, the Turkish Football Federation imposed a penalty of six points due to the club's misleading that came in effect in the 2016–17 season.

In the 12th week of the 2017–18 league season, Ataşehir Belediyespor hosted their five-time consecutive league champion archrival Konak Belediyespor. Both teams were undefeated, Ataşehir Belediyespor was league leader with no goals conceded so far. The Istanbul-based team won the derby match 4–1, and kept so their rival at bay with five points difference, a consolation for the one goal conceded in the match.

Ataşehir Belediyespor became the 2017–18 League champion two matches before the league's end, regaining the title from Konak Belediyespor, who held the title five seasons in a row. This is the third title of the Istanbul-based team in their history.

Ataşehir Belediyespor took part in the Group 4 of the 018–19 UEFA Women's Champions League qualifying round held in Budapest, Hungary between 7–13 August 2018. They lost to the Czech team SK Slavia Praha, drew with the host team MTK Hungária FC and defeated KFF Mitrovica from Kosovo. They ranked third in the group, and failed so to advance to the Round of 32.

Ataşehir Belediyespor finished the 2018-19 First League season in the fourth place. They efaeted their arch rival Konak Belediyespor with 3-1 in the home match of the season's last round.

The team finished the 2023-24 Super League season at 14th place, and was relegated to the First League for the next season.

== Stadium ==
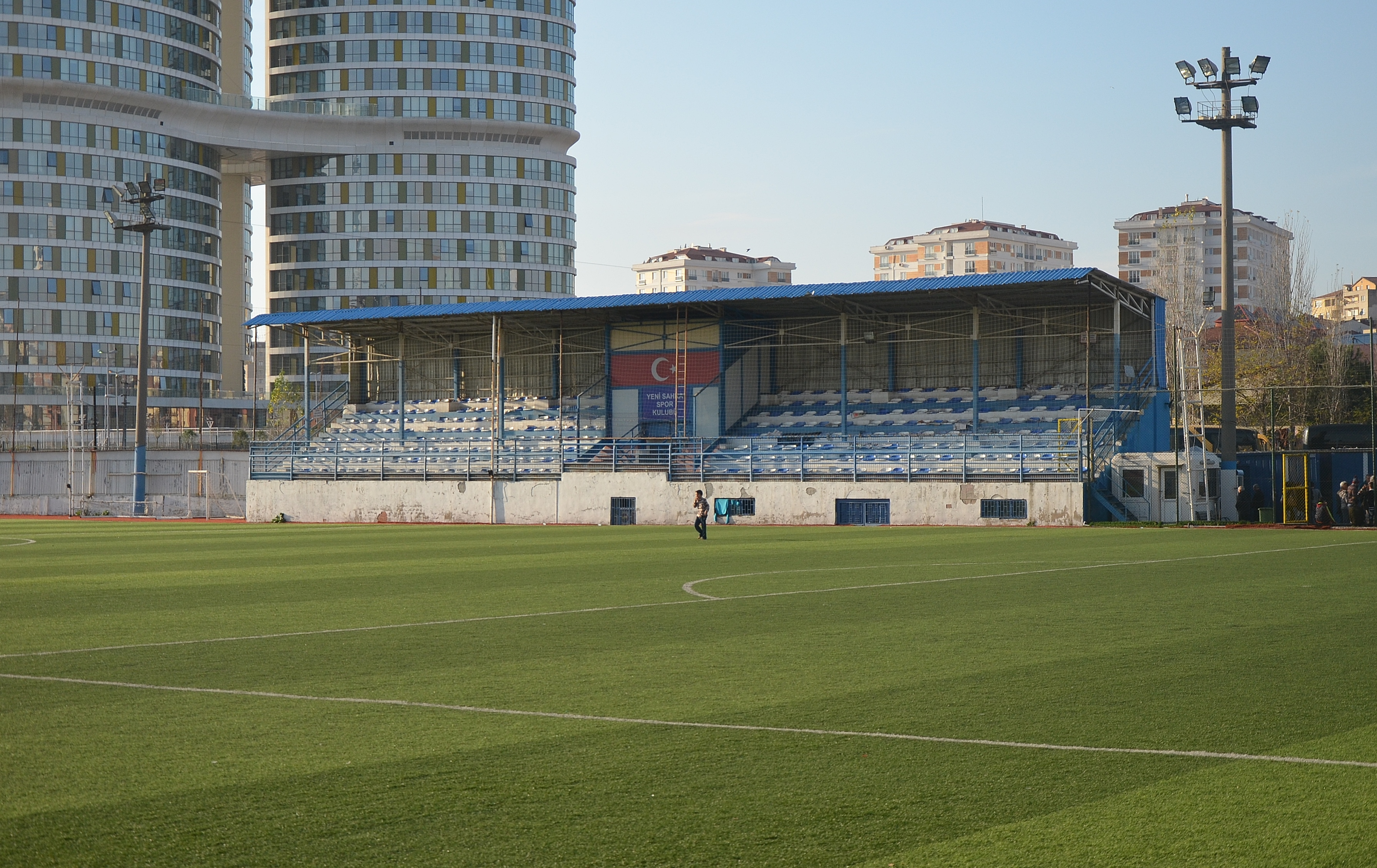
Yeni Sahra Stadium, home of Ataşehir Belediyespor.

Ataşehir Belediyespor play their home matches at Yeni Sahra Stadium in Yenisahra neighborhood of Ataşehir district in Istanbul. Opened in 2008, the venue is owned by Istanbul Metropolitan Municipality and operated by Yeni Sahra Sports Club.

The stadium is illuminated for night matches. Its ground is covered by artificial turf. The venue offers a parking lot for up to 50 cars.

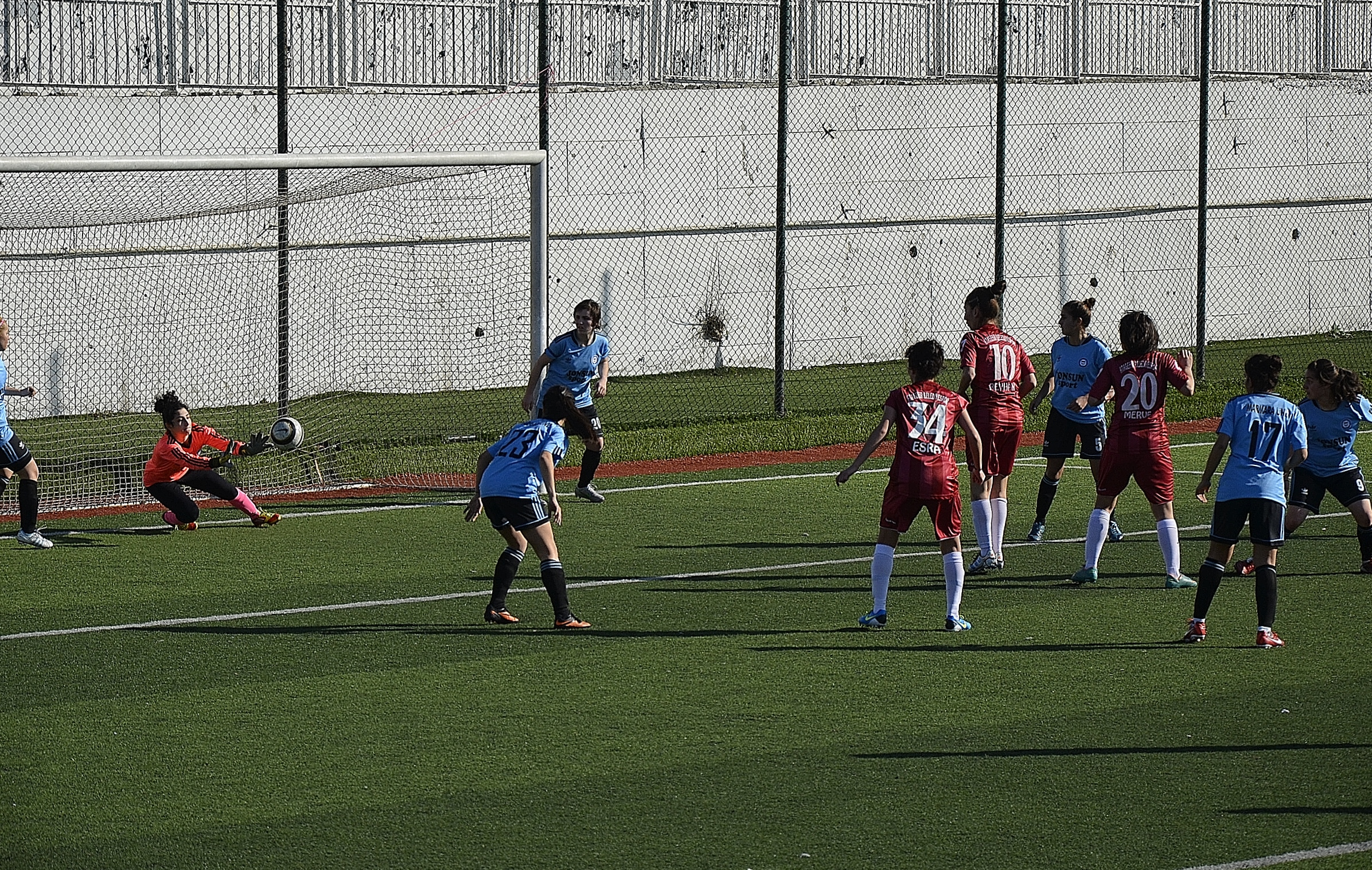
Ataşehir Belediyespor (red) in attack at home match against Marmara Üniversitesi Spor (2013–14 season)

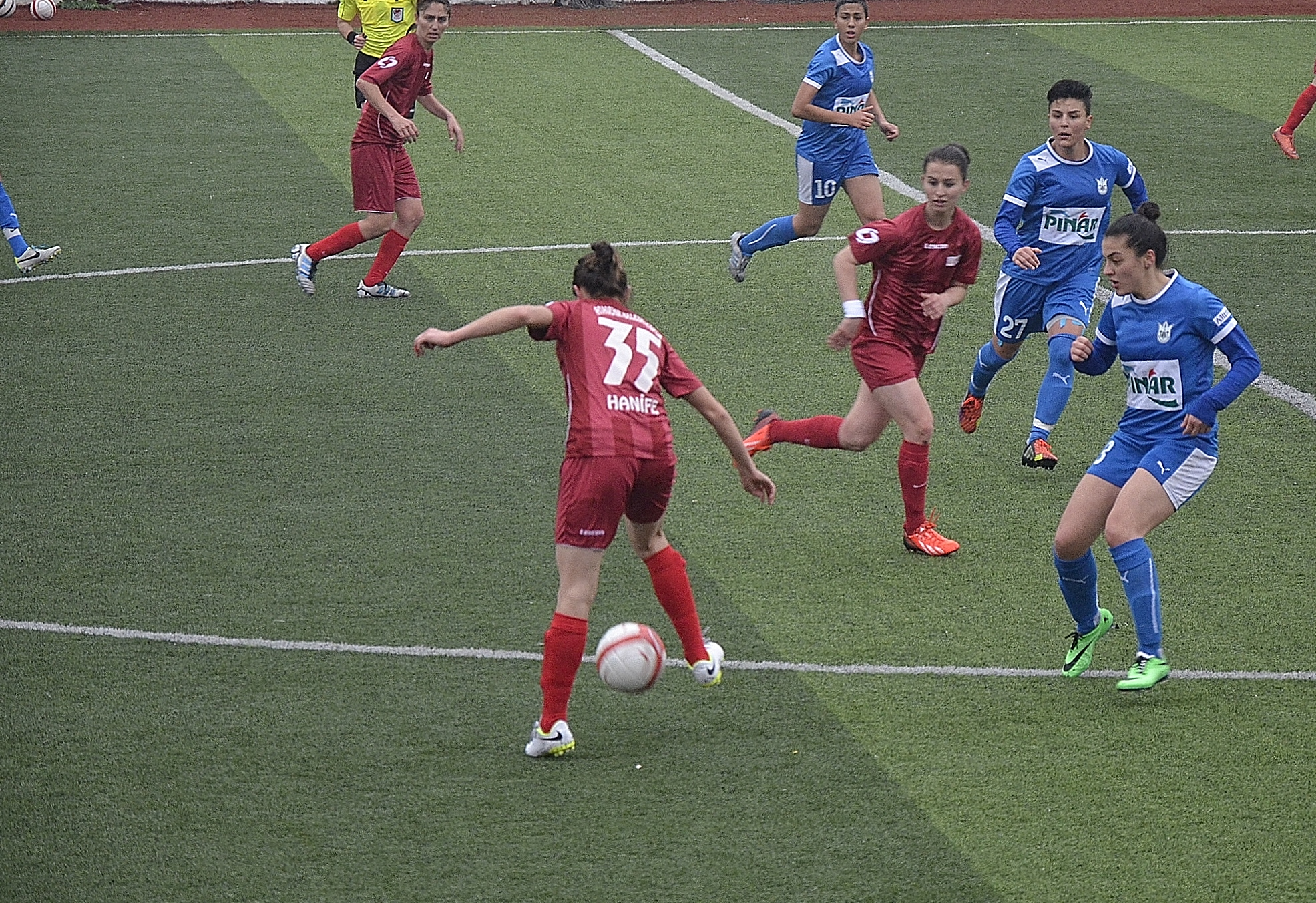
Ataşehir Belediyespor (red) in attack at home match against Konak Belediyespor (2013–14 season)

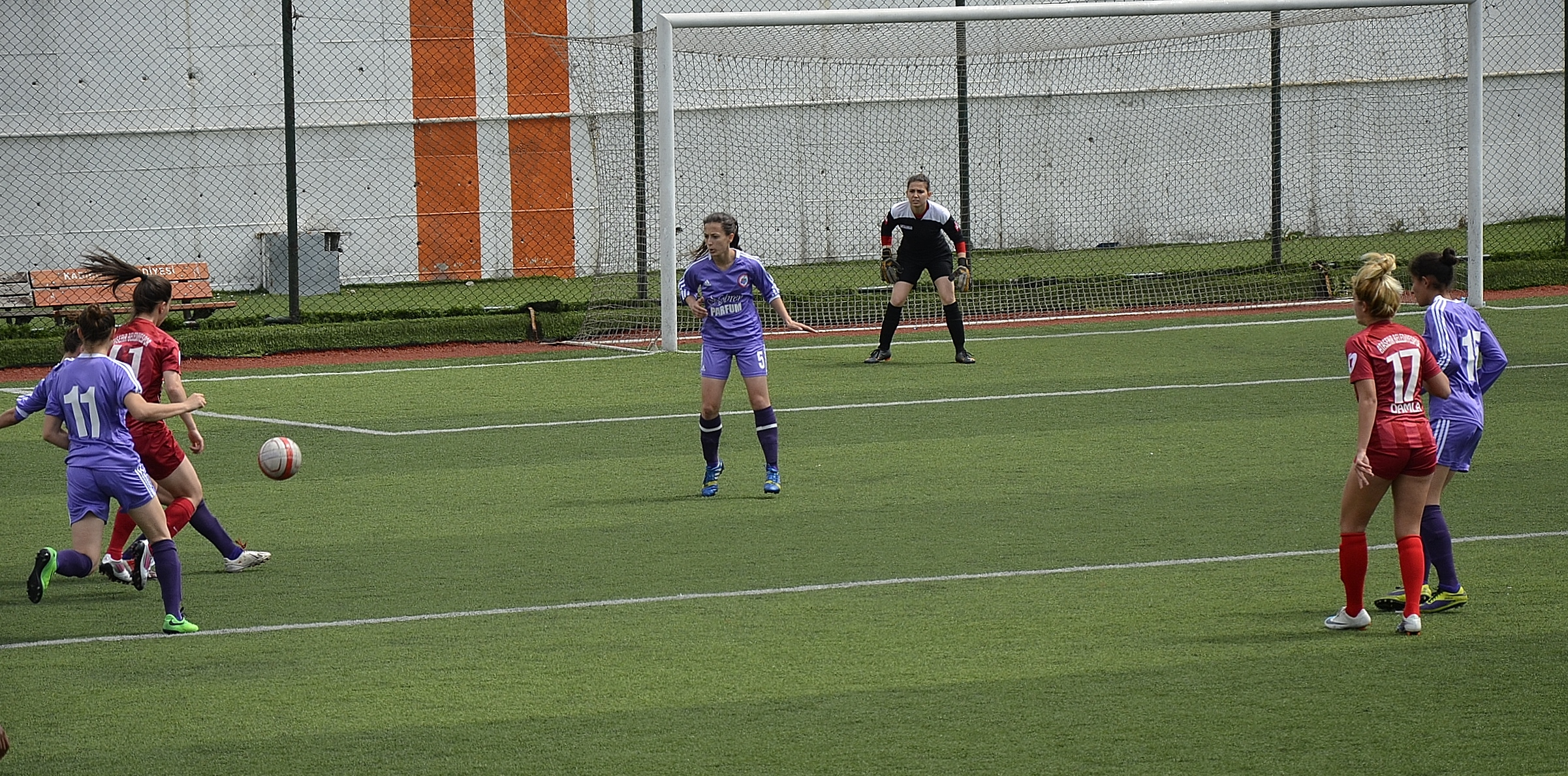
Ataşehir Belediyespor (red) in attack at home match against Kdz. Ereğlispor (2013–14 season)

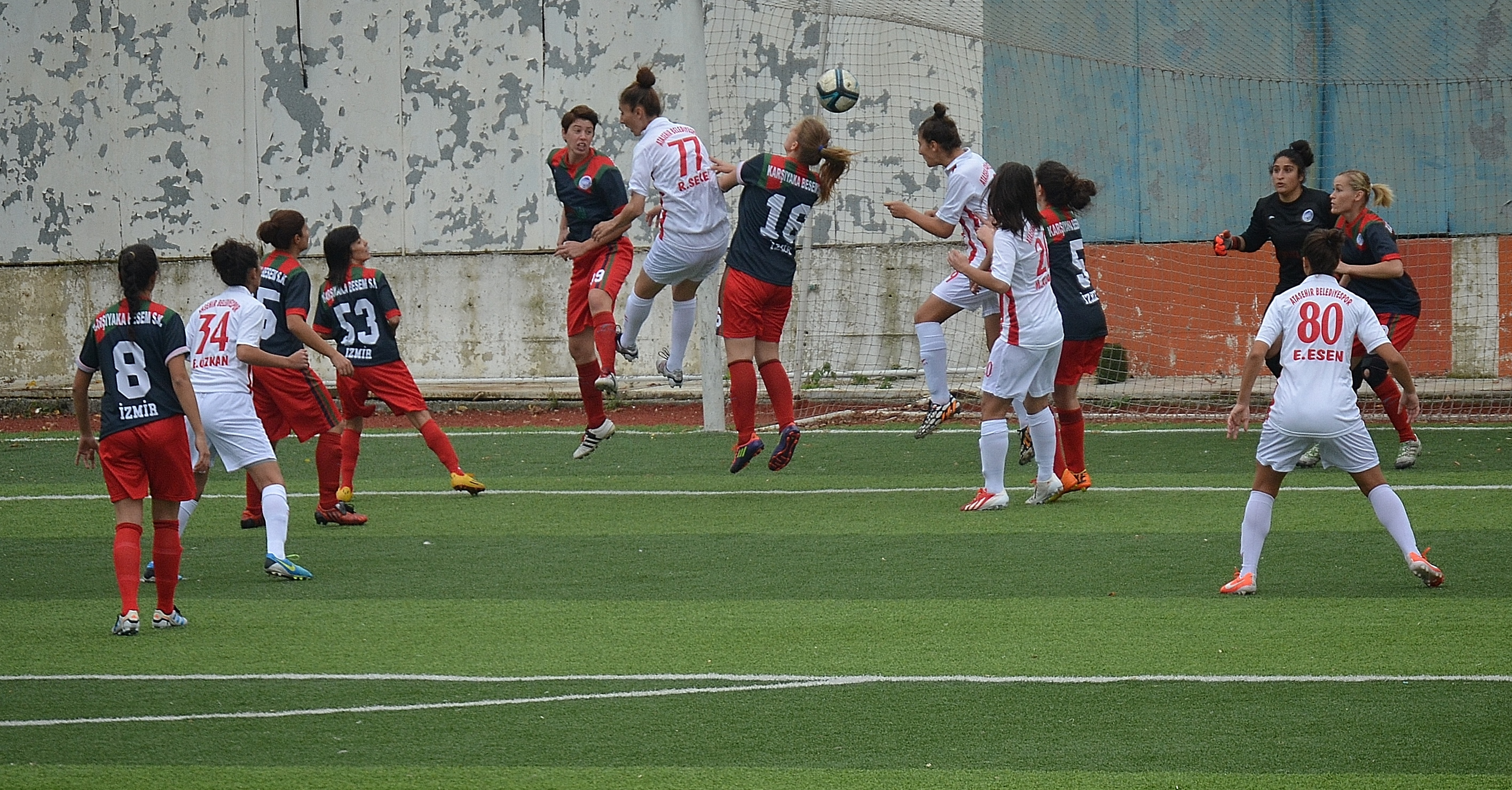
Ataşehir Belediyespor (white) vs Karşıyaka BESEM Spor in the 2014–15 season

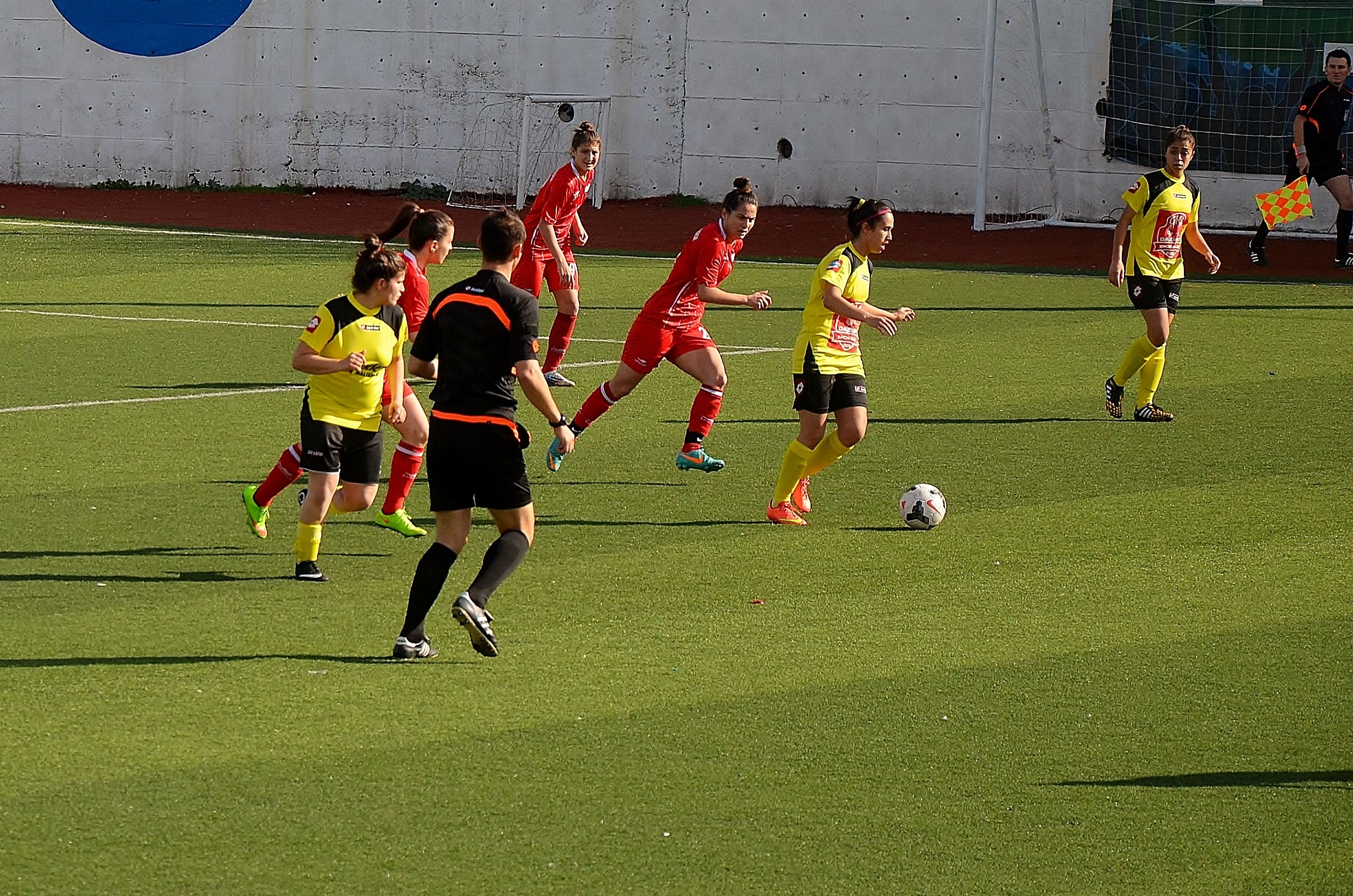
Ataşehir Belediyespor (red) vs Gazikentspor in the 2014–15 season

== Statistics ==
As of 8 January 2023

Season	League	Rank	Pld	W	D	L	GF	GA	GD	Pts
2008–09	Second League Div. 2	1	8	5	1	2	21	5	+16	16
2009–10	First League	4	18	11	3	4	43	32	+11	36
2010–11	First League	1	22	18	3	1	85	7	+78	57
2011–12	First League	1	20	17	1	2	88	10	+78	52
2012–13	First League	2	18	14	1	3	75	22	+53	43
2013–14	First League	2	20	14	4	2	65	23	+37	46
2014–15	First League	2	19	16	2	1	69	11	+58	50
2015–16	First League	2	18	15	0	3	78	10	+68	45
2016–17	First League	3	26	17	5	4	58	24	+34	50 (^{1})
2017–18	First League	1	18	16	2	0	75	4	+71	50
2018–19	First League	4	18	11	2	5	41	24	+17	35
2019–20	First League	4	16	10	2	4	43	21	+22	32
2020–21	First League Gr. B	8	4	1	2	1	8	5	+3	5
2021-22	Super League Gr. A	8 (^{2})	22	8	0	14	34	38	-4	24
2022-23	Super League Gr. B	6 (^{3})	18	6	3	9	35	51	-16	21
2022-23	Play-offs		2	0	0	2	0	11	-11	0
2023-24	Super League	14	30	5	7	18	30	75	-45	22
Green marks a season followed by promotion, red a season followed by relegation.

- (^{1}) Six penalty points had been deducted in the beginning of the season imposed by the Turkish Football Federation.
- (^{2}) Finished Gr. A 8th
- (^{3}) Season in progress

== 2024 squad ==
As of 5 May 2024

- Head coach: (Turkey) Levent Avcı

Note: Flags indicate national team as defined under FIFA eligibility rules; some limited exceptions apply. Players may hold more than one non-FIFA nationality.

No.	Pos.	Nation	Player
1	GK	TUR	Ceren Başaran
16	DF	TUR	Rabia Balaban
23	DF	MAR	Zoubida El Bastali
30	DF	BRA	Milena Costa de Melo
66	DF	TUR	Ekinsu Çakmak
6	MF	TUR	Damla Kılınç
8	MF	TUR	Gül Eroğlu

No.	Pos.	Nation	Player
14	MF	BRA	Sara Piveta
18	MF	TUR	Helin Ataç
19	MF	USA	Sarah Mirr
20	MF	TUR	Zeynep Ece Güneş
99	MF	TUR	Gizem Yarlıgaç
7	FW	VEN	Enyerliannys Higuera Bretis
9	FW	NGR	Taiwo Lawal
28	FW	CMR	Henriette Akaba

== Former managers ==
- Adnan Katip (2010–2011)
- Muharrem Uzun (2012–2013)
- Gürkan Çavdar (2013)
- Selma İzitaş (2013)
- Bahtiyar Topal (2009–2010, 2011–2012, 2013–2015)
- Ekrem Köse (2015–216)
- Murat Kaya (2016)
- Taner Öner (2016–2017, 2022-2023)
- Şeref Aslan (2017)

== International results ==
Event	Stage	Date	Venue	Opponent	Result	Scorers
2011–12 UEFA Women's Champions League	QR; Group 4; 3rd	Aug 11, 2011	Bosnia and Herzegovina, Sarajevo	(Lithuania) Gintra Universitetas	D 1–1	Stasiulytė (o.g.)
2011–12 UEFA Women's Champions League	QR; Group 4; 3rd	Aug 13, 2011	Bosnia and Herzegovina, Sarajevo	(Bosnia and Herzegovina) SFK 2000	L 1–4	Aladağ
2011–12 UEFA Women's Champions League	QR; Group 4; 3rd	Aug 16, 2011	Bosnia and Herzegovina, Sarajevo	(Romania) Olimpia Cluj	L 1–4	Aladağ
2012–13 UEFA Women's Champions League	QR; Group 1; 3rd	Aug 11, 2012	Slovenia, Lendava, Beltinci	(Lithuania) Gintra Universitetas	W 3–2	Matveeva (2), Aladağ
2012–13 UEFA Women's Champions League	QR; Group 1; 3rd	Aug 13, 2012	Slovenia, Lendava, Beltinci	(Switzerland) Zürich	L 0–4	
2012–13 UEFA Women's Champions League	QR; Group 1; 3rd	Aug 16, 2012	Slovenia, Lendava, Beltinci	(Slovenia) Pomurje	L 2–4	Uraz, Ebi
2018–19 UEFA Women's Champions League	QR; Group 4; 3rd	Aug 7, 018	Hungary, Budapest	(Czech Republic) SK Slavia Praha	L 2–7	Uraz, Akaba
2018–19 UEFA Women's Champions League	QR; Group 4; 3rd	Aug 10, 2018	Hungary, Budapest	(Hungary) MTK Hungária FC	D 2–2	Uraz, Akaba
2018–19 UEFA Women's Champions League	QR; Group 4; 3rd	Aug 13, 2018	Hungary, Budapest	(Kosovo) KFF Mitrovica	W 6–1	Sunday, Houij (2), Çınar, Uraz, Akaba

== UEFA Ranking history ==
Season	Rank	Points	Ref.
2011–12	99 ▲	1.160	
2012–13	92 ▲	2.490	
2013–14	83 ▲	4.800	
2014–15	85 ▼	5.130	
2015–16	78 ▲	5.295	
2016–17	78	4.960	
2018–19	81 ▲	3.975	
2019–20	84 ▼	3.975	
2020–21	90 ▼	3.000	
2021–22	103 ▼	3.100	
2022–23	113 ▼	3.000	

== Notable former players ==
Turkey national team members

- Büşra Ahlatcı (2009–2015, 2016)
- Nagehan Akşan (2018–2019,2022–2023)
- Merve Aladağ (2011–2015)
- Elif Ataol (2018–2019)
- Bilgesu Aydın (2012–2015)
- Çiğdem Belci (2010–2015, 2016–2018)
- Kübra Berber (2016–2019)
- Ezgi Çağlar (2011–2015, 2017)
- Sevgi Çınar (2017–2018)
- Sevinç Çorlu (2009–2017)
- Damla Demirdön (2010–2916)
- Sibel Duman (2019)
- Hanife Demiryol (2012–2015)
- Lütfiye Ercimen (2010–2016)
- Medine Erkan (2014–2016)
- Esra Erol (2018)
- Başak Ersoy (2010–2013)
- Emine Ecem Esen (2014–2015)
- Başak Gündoğdu (2014–2015)
- Kader Hançar (2013–2017)
- Fatma Kara (2014–2017)
- Arzu Karabulut (2017–2018)
- Seval Kıraç (2011–2017)
- Beyza Kocatürk (2018–2019)
- Safa Merve Nalçacı (2018)
- Mevlüde Öztürk (2013–2015)
- Reyhan Şeker (2010–2018)
- Ebru Topçu (2017–2018)
- Ece Türkoğlu (2017–2018)
- Yağmur Uraz (2010–2013, 2016–2018)
- Berna Yeniçeri (2017–2018)
- Duygu Yılmaz (2010–2018)

Foreigners

- (Belarus) Anastasiya Kunitskaya (2019)
- (Cameroon) Henriette Akaba (2018)
- (Cameroon) Bibi Medoua (2014)
- (Cameroon) Carine Yoh (2016)
- (Georgia (country)) Tatiana Matveeva (2011–2013)
- (Georgia (country)) Nino Pasikashvili (2016–2017)
- (Georgia (country)) Nino Sutidze (2016–2018)
- (Georgia (country)) Khatia Tchkonia (2017)
- (Nigeria) Cynthia Aku (2022–2023)
- (Nigeria) Ijeoma Queenth Daniels (2015–2016)
- (Nigeria) Onome Ebi (2011–2013)
- (Nigeria) Desire Oparanozie (2014)
- (Nigeria) Esther Sunday (2018)
- (Ukraine) Tetyana Kozyrenko (2018)
- (United States) Danesha Adams (2013)

== Honours ==
Turkish Women's First Football League

- Winners (3): 2010–11, 2011–12, 2017–18
- Runners-up (4): 2012–13, 2013–14, 2014–15, 2015–16
- Third places (1): 2016–17

Turkish Women's Second Football League

- Winners (1): 2008–09

== Kit history ==
2013–14 home	2014–15 home	2014–15 5 away	2015–16 home	2016–17 home	2016–17 away
2017–18 home	2017–18 away	2018–19 home	2018–19 away	2018–19 alt	2019–20 home
2019–20 away	2021–22 home

== Squad history ==
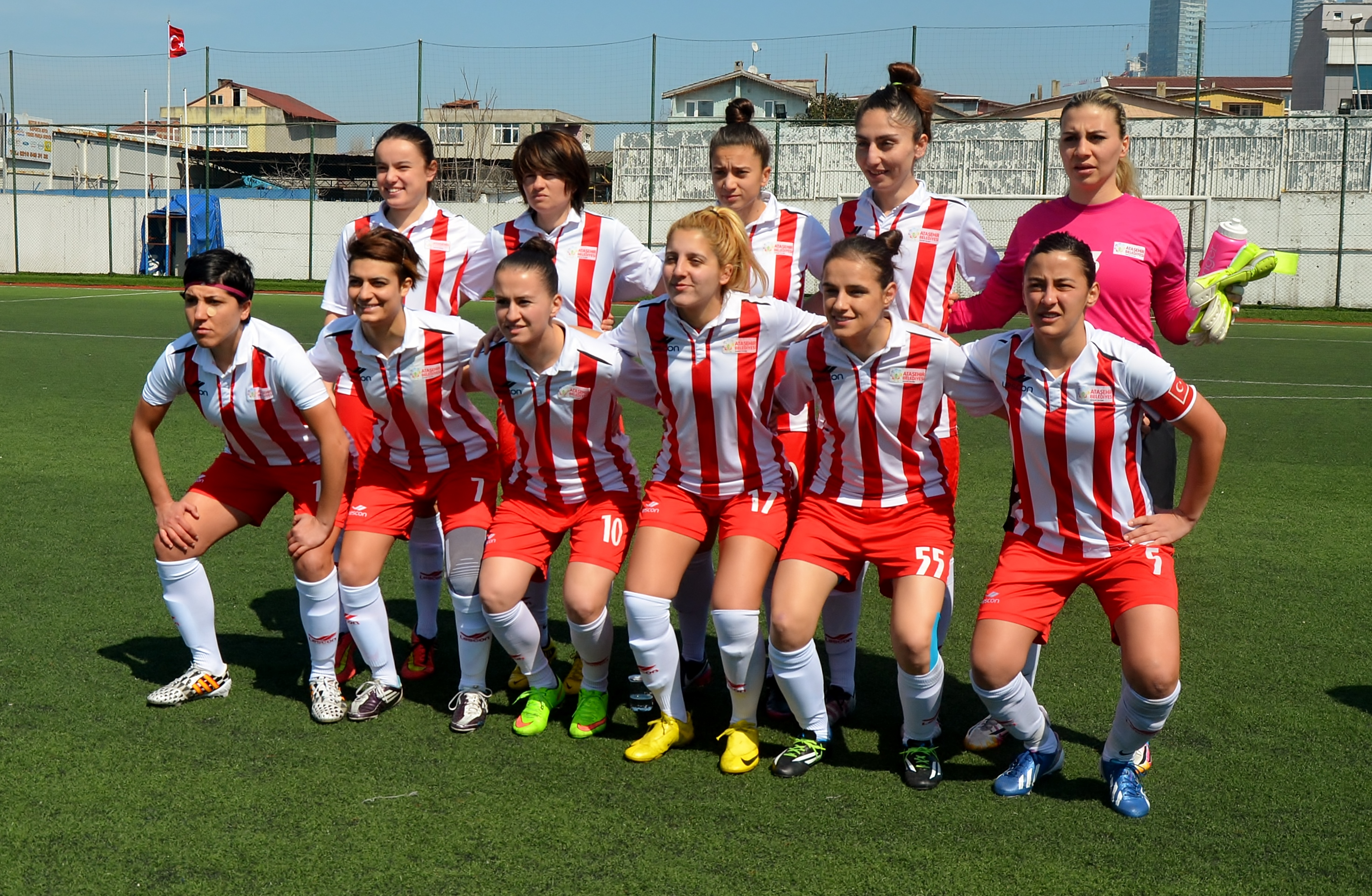
Ataşehir Belediyespor 2014–15 league season

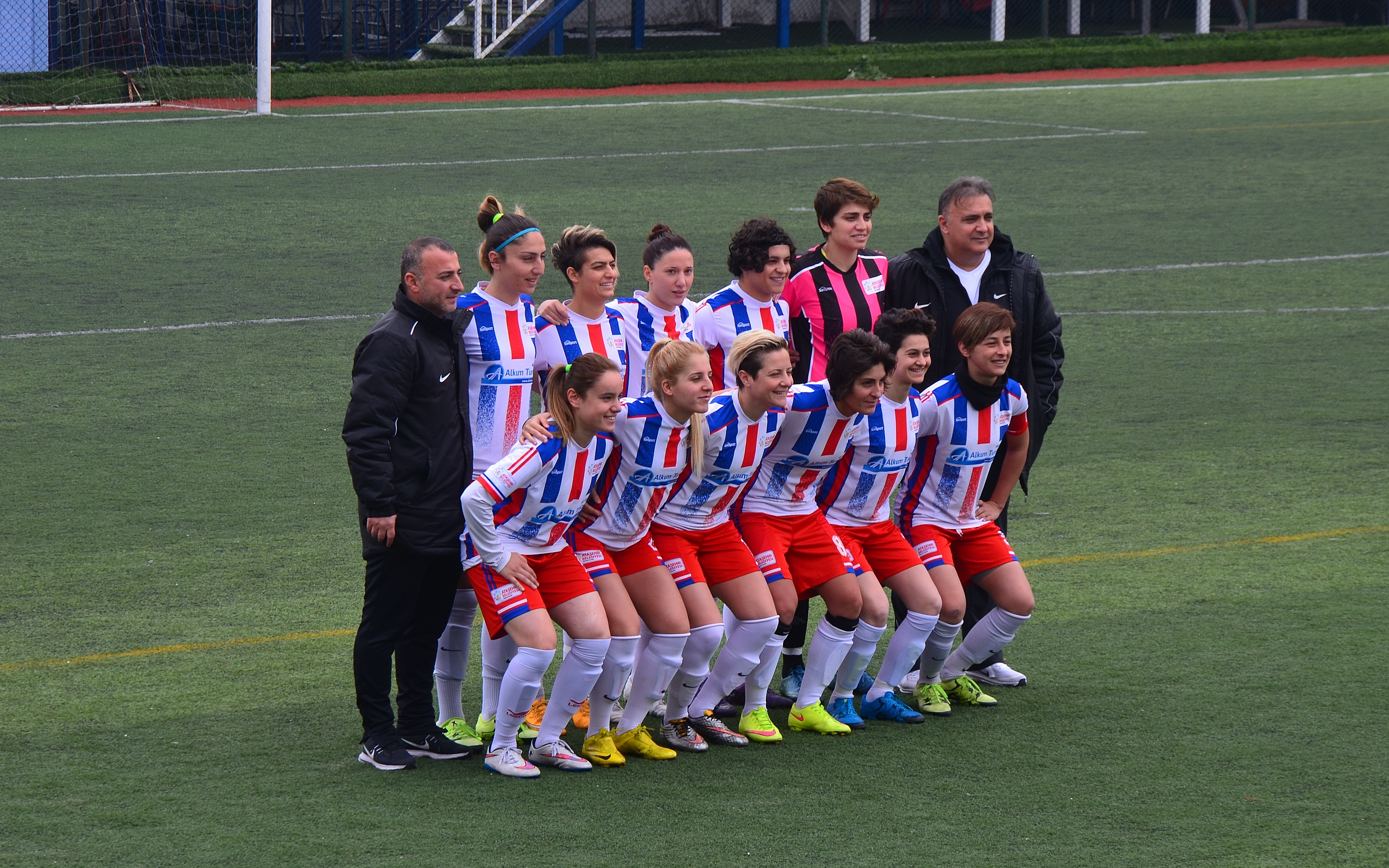
Ataşehir Belediyespor 2015–16 league season

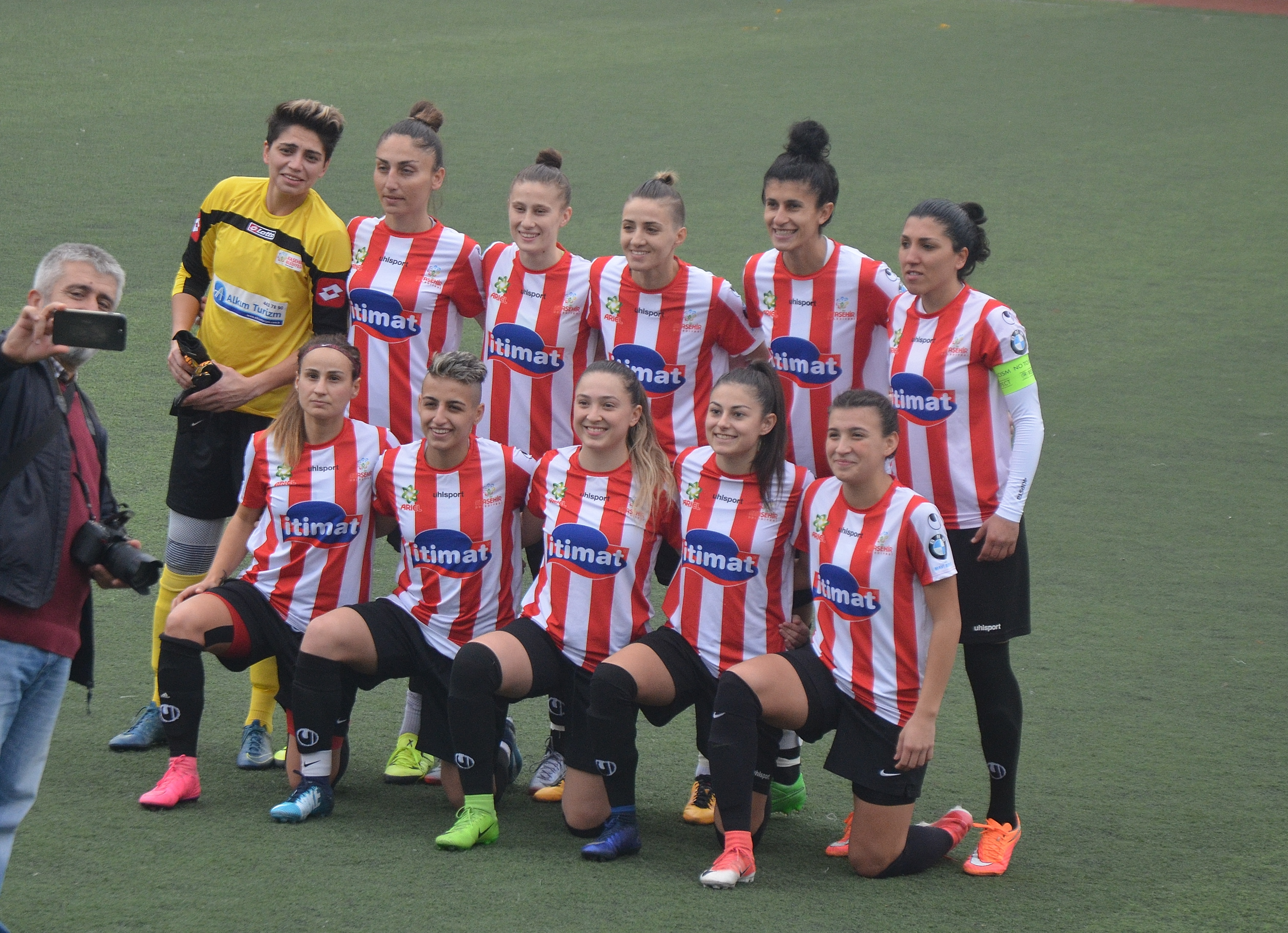
Ataşehir Belediyespor 2017–18 league season

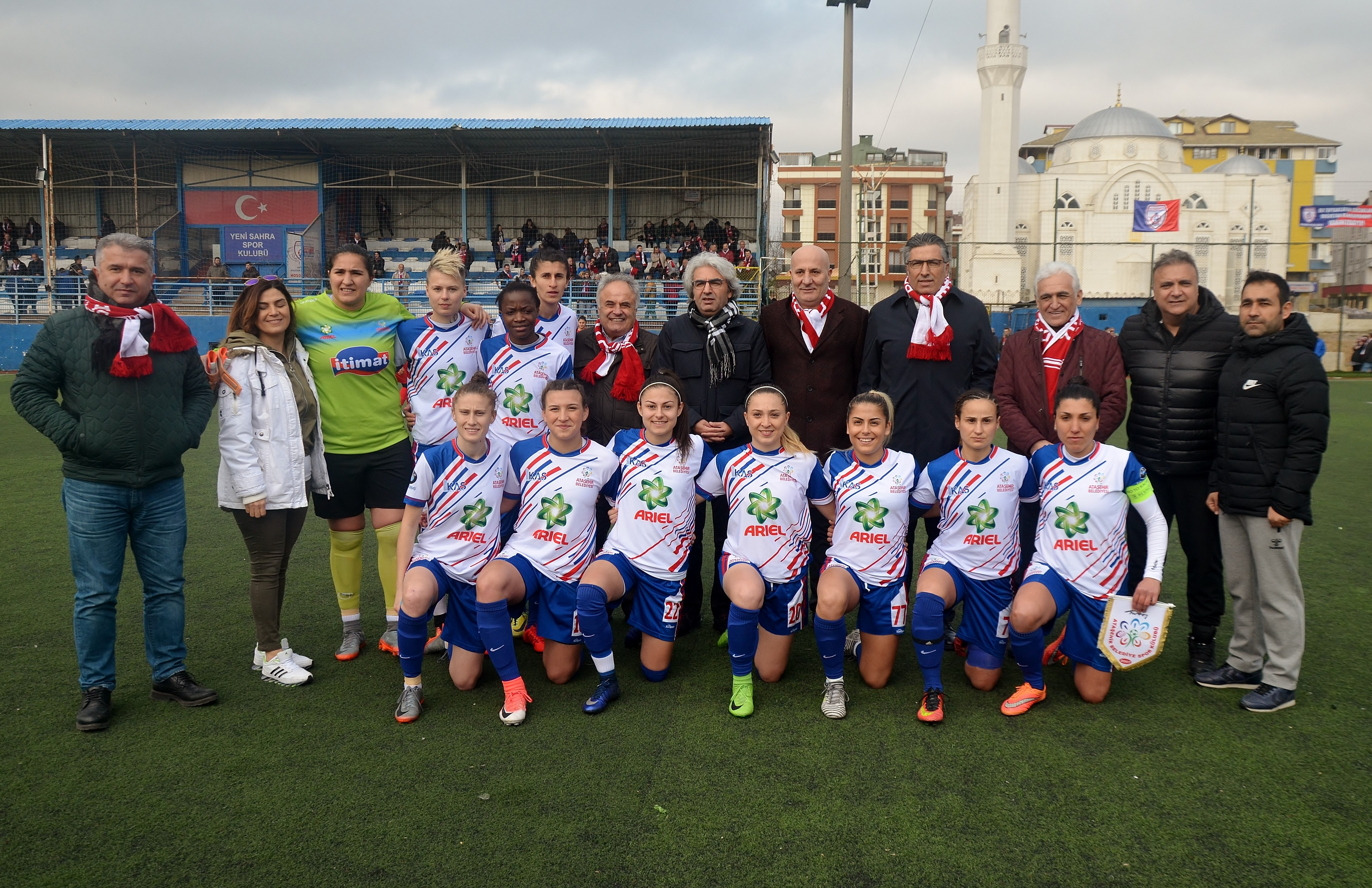
Ataşehir Belediyespor 2017–18 league season

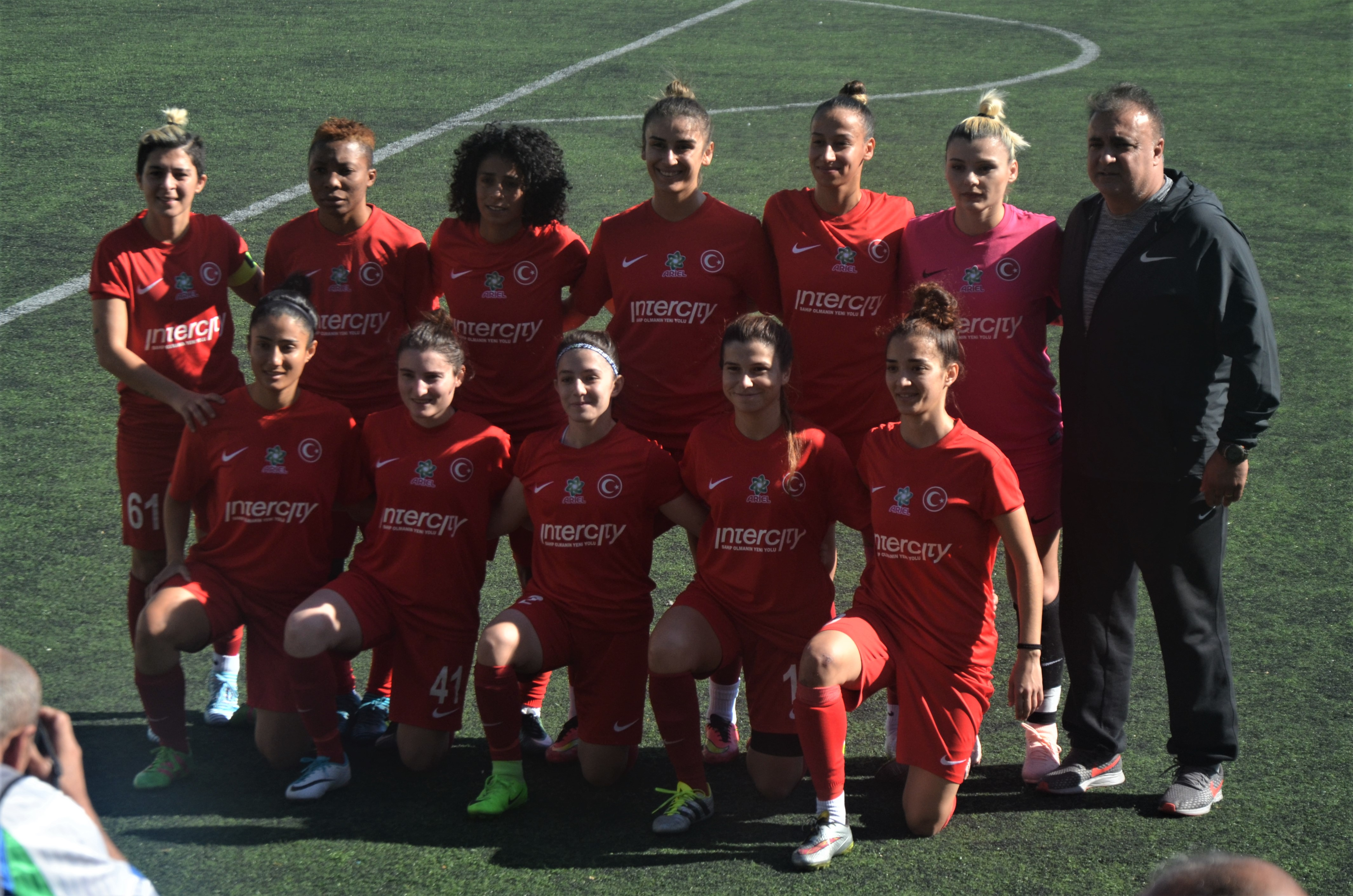
Ataşehir Belediyespor 2018–19 league season

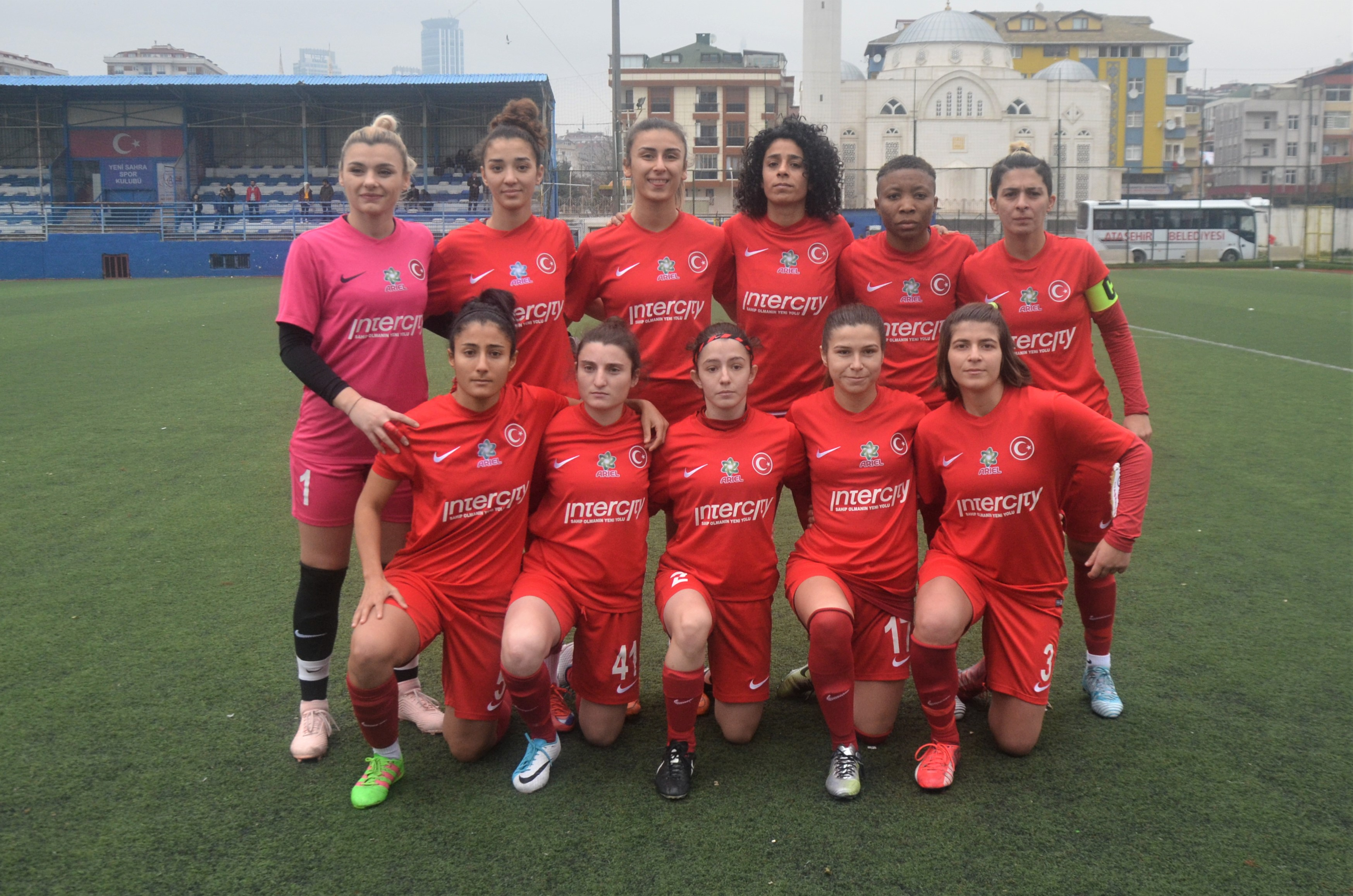
Ataşehir Belediyespor 2018–19 league season

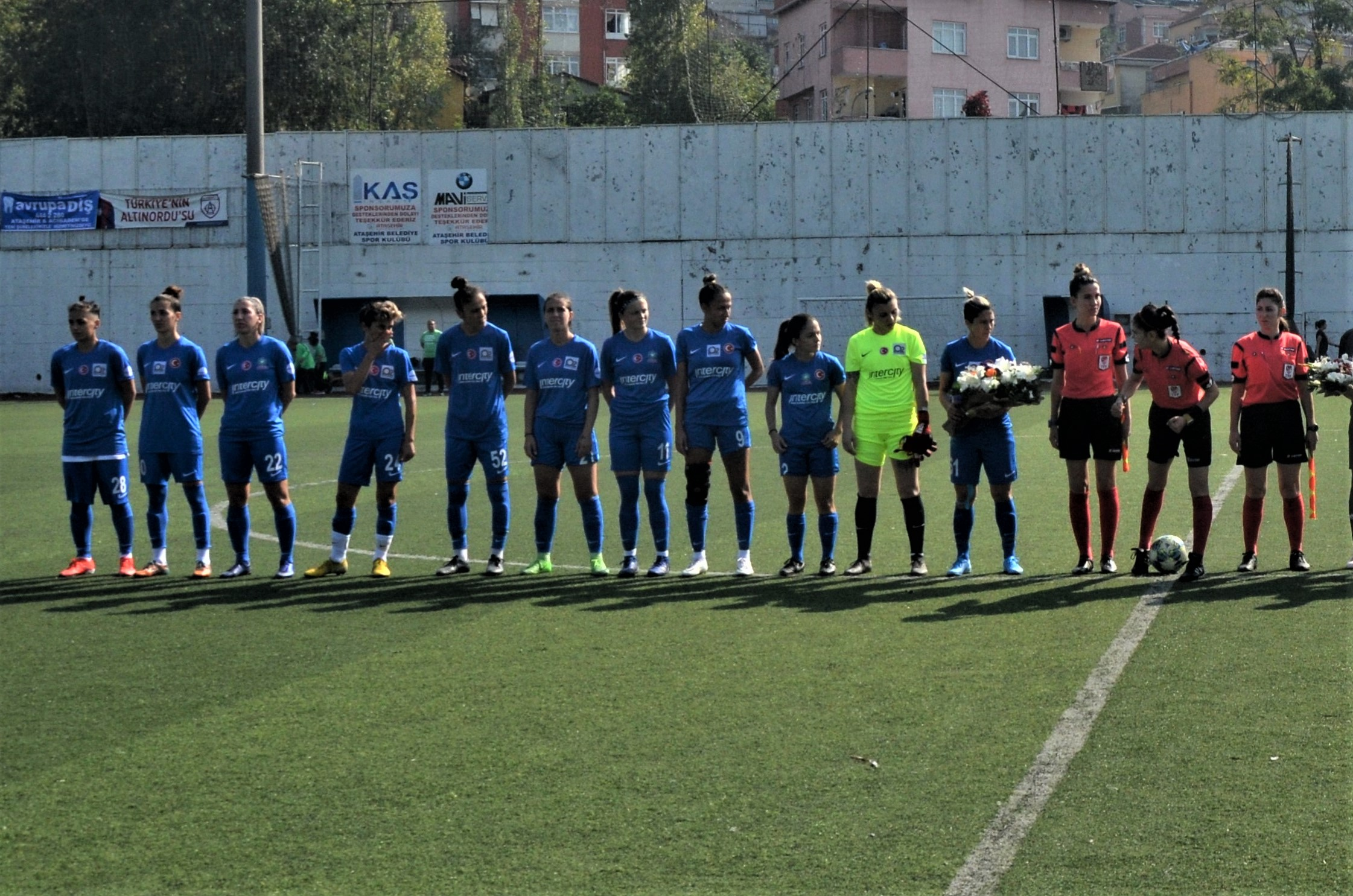
Ataşehir Belediyespor in the 2019-20 Women's First League season's home match against Beşiktaş J.K.

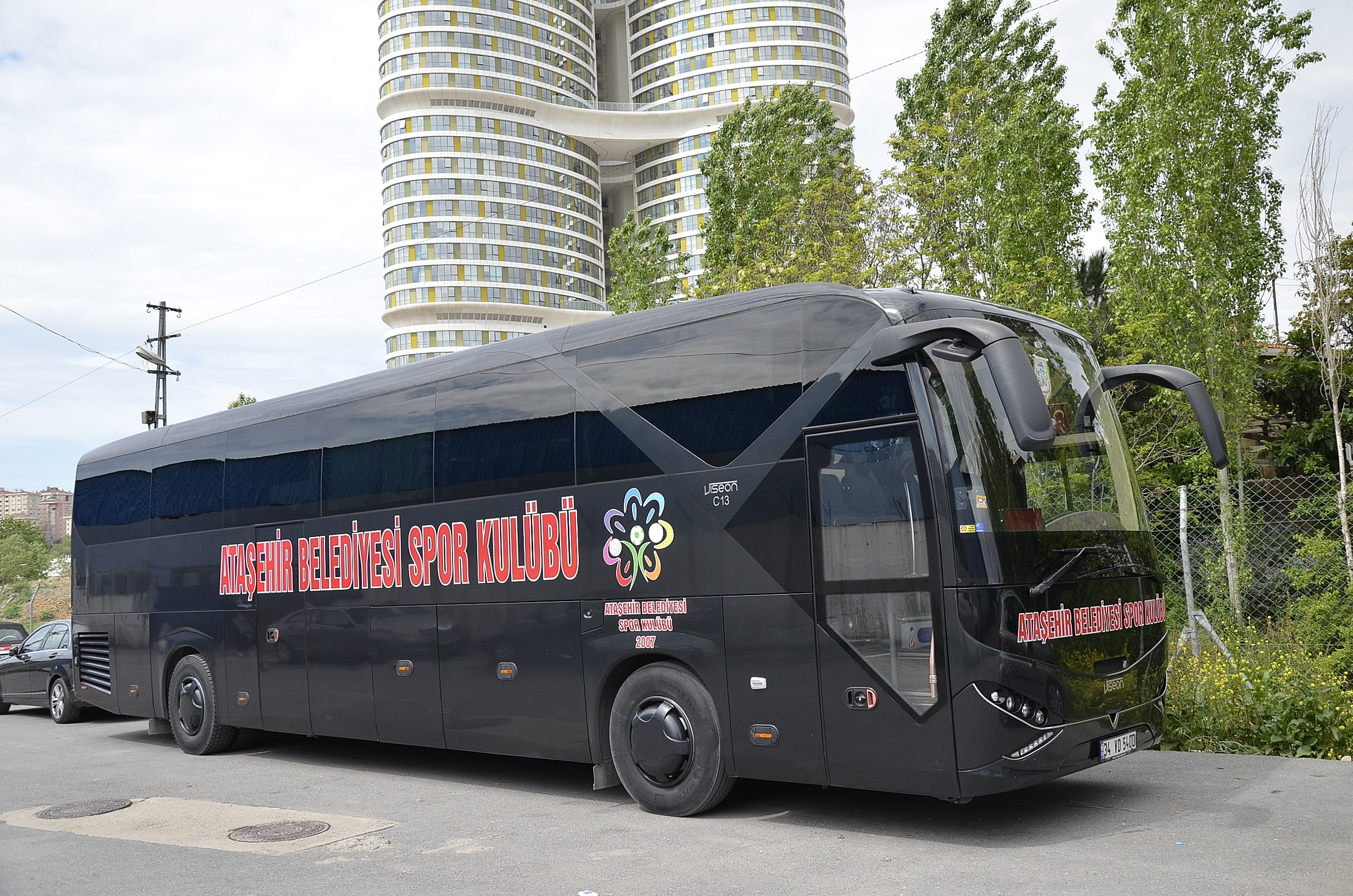
Team bus (April 2014)
