= Yeni Sahra Stadium =

Sporting venue in Turkey

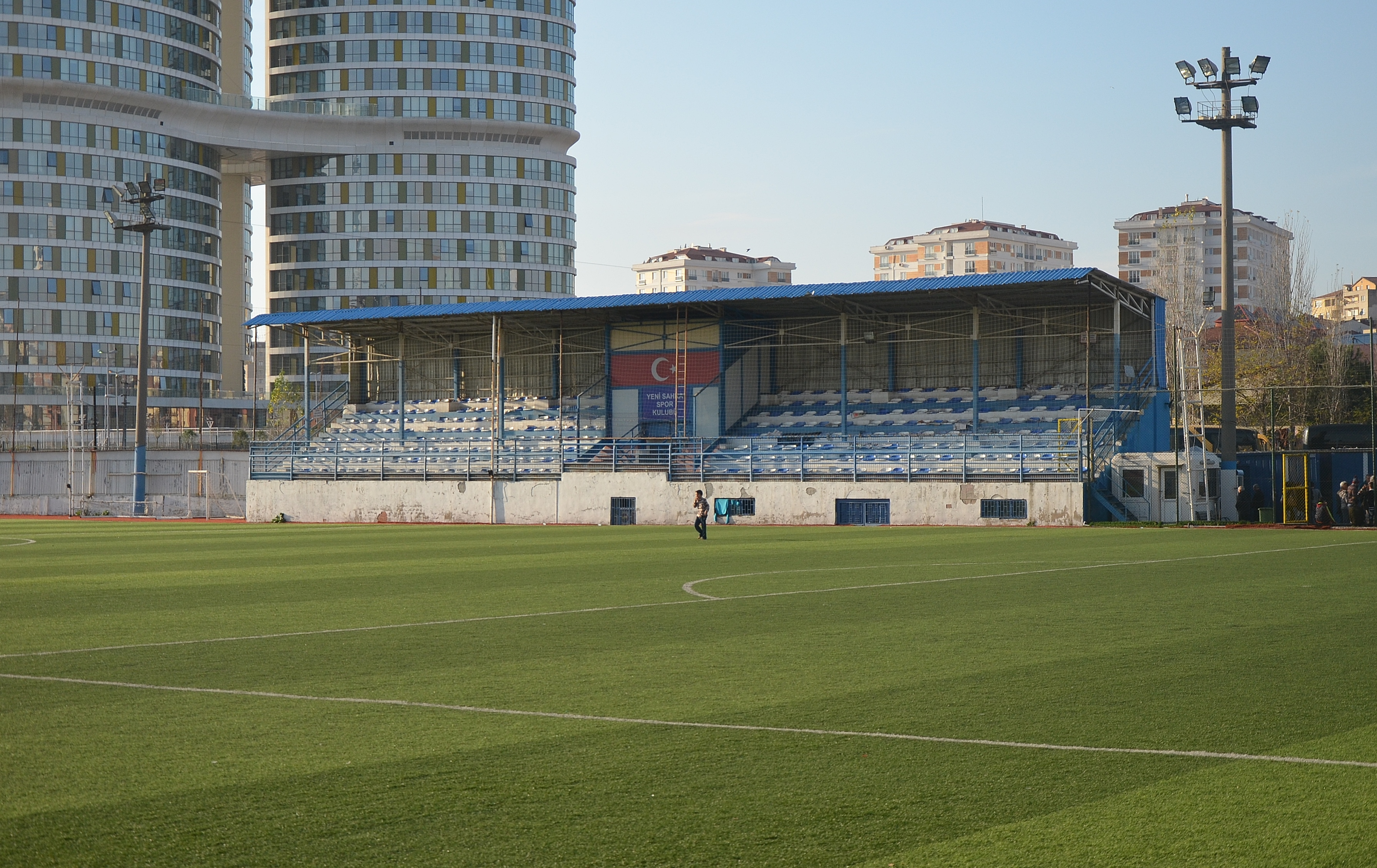
- View of Yeni Sahra Stadium

- Location of Yeni Sahra Stadium in Istanbul, Turkey
- Address: Yeni Sahra Mah., Karaman Cad. 51
- Location: 34746 Ataşehir, Istanbul, Turkey
- Coordinates: 40°59′33.60″N 29°05′19.11″E
- Owner: Istanbul Metropolitan Municipality
- Capacity: 1000 (500 seats + 500 standing)
- Surface: Artificial turf

Construction
- Opened: 2008; 18 years ago

Tenant
- Ataşehir Belediyespor

Yeni Sahra Stadium (Turkish: Yeni Sahra Stadı) is a football stadium in the Ataşehir district of the city of Istanbul. The stadium has a capacity of 700 spectators (1000 in 2025) and was built in 2008. Stadium was under renovation between 2024-25.

The stadium is currently used for football matches only, and it is the home ground of Ataşehir Belediyespor women's football team.

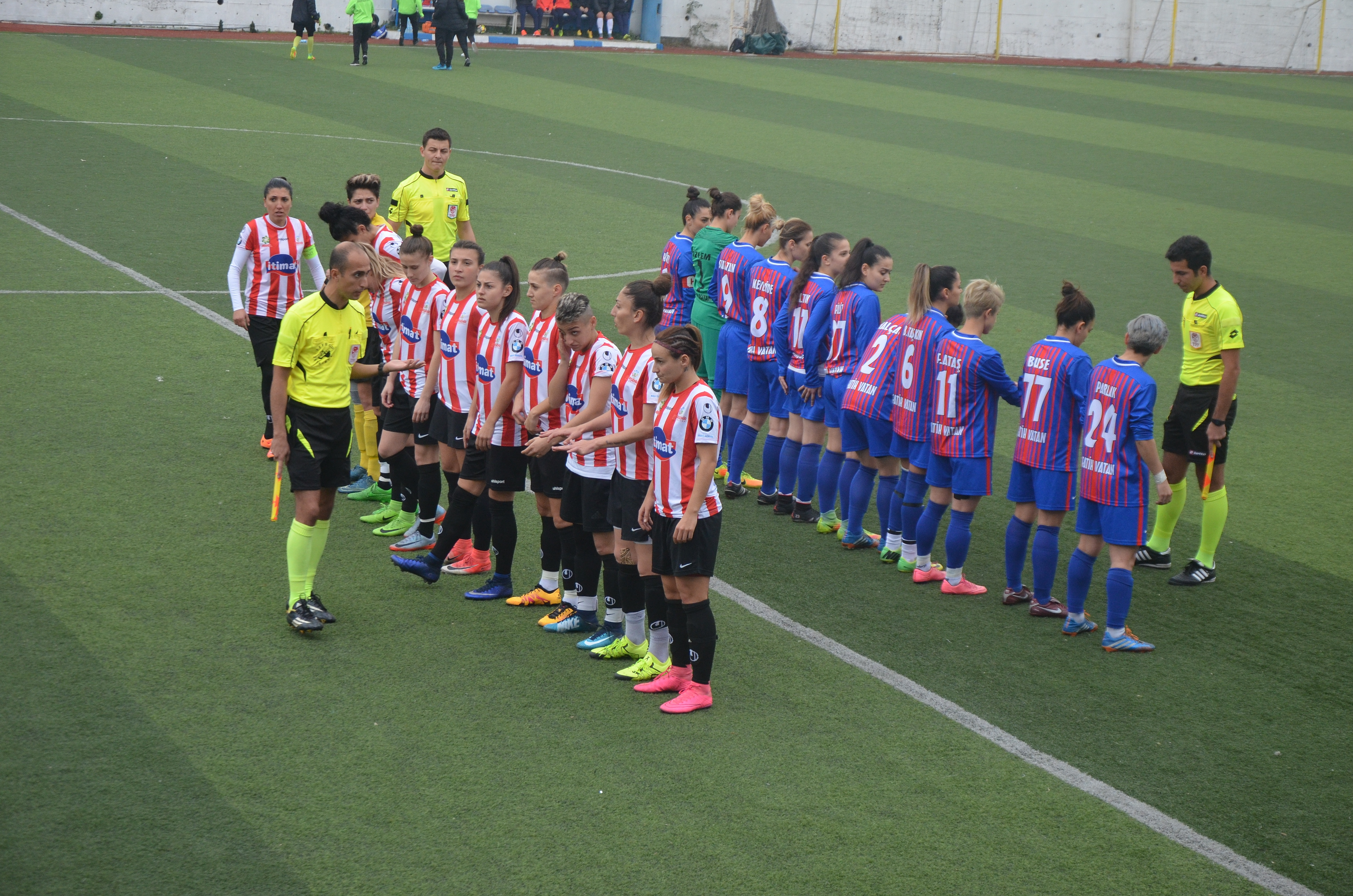
A match in the stadium

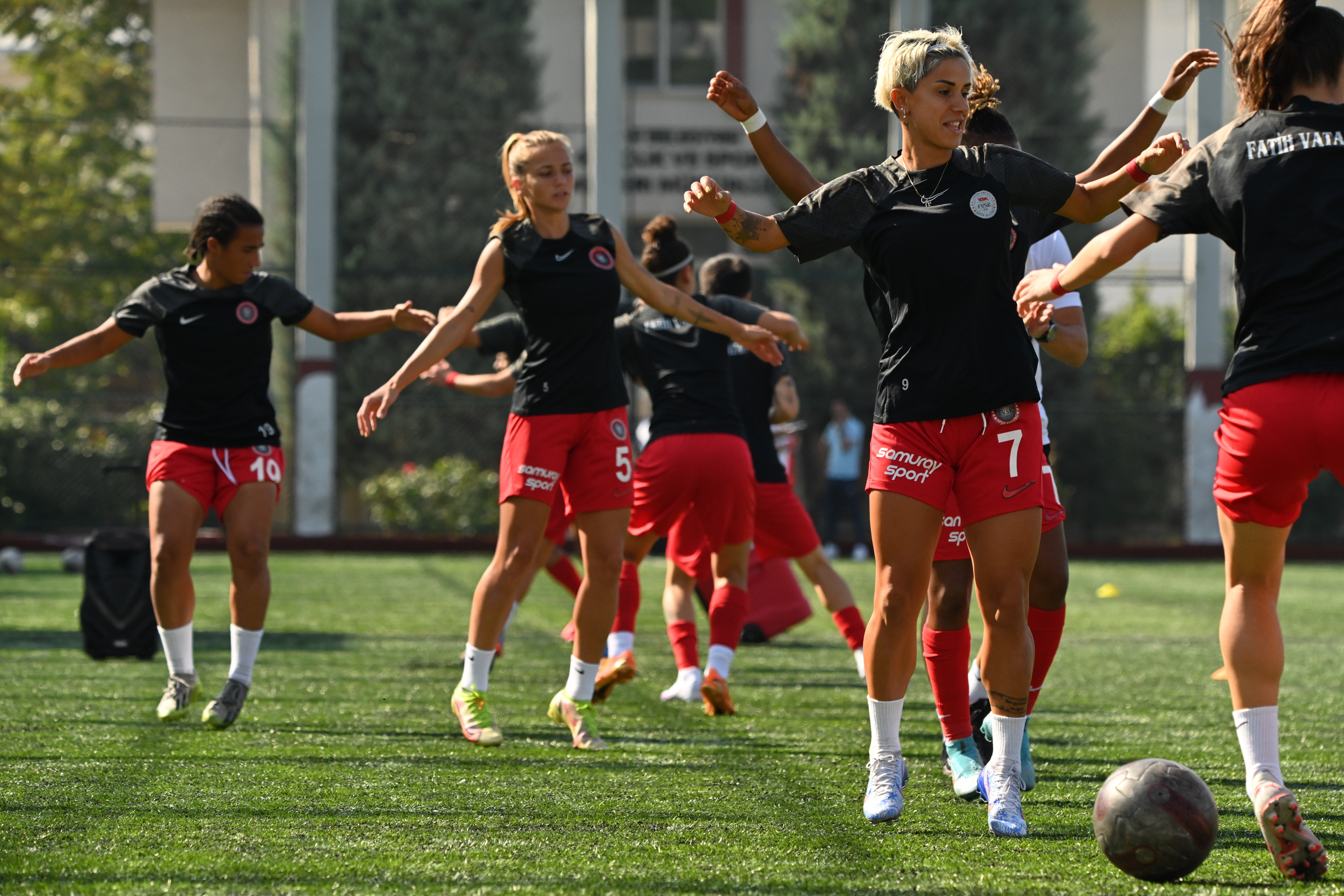
Training in the stadium

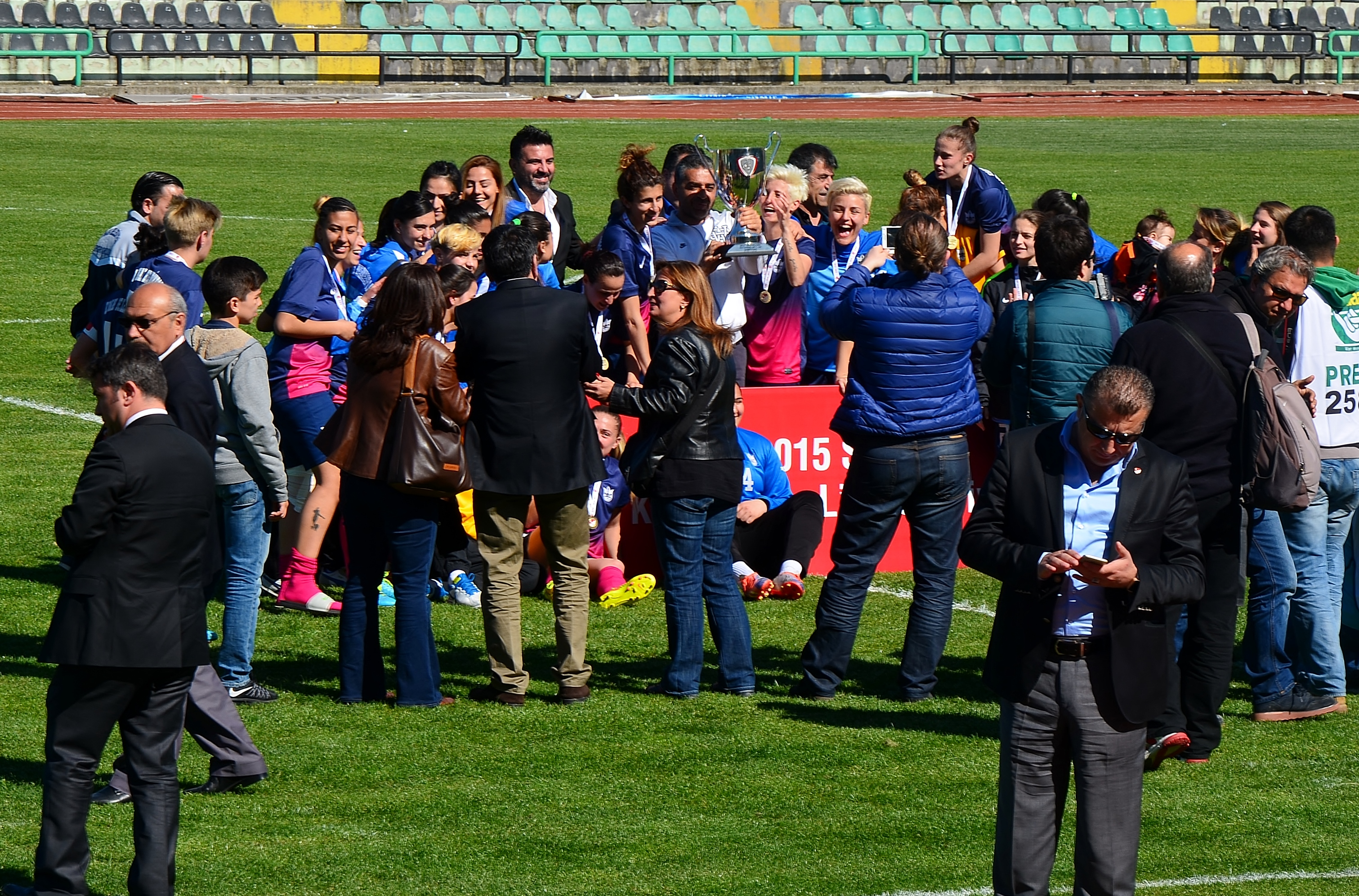
Trophy event in the stadium

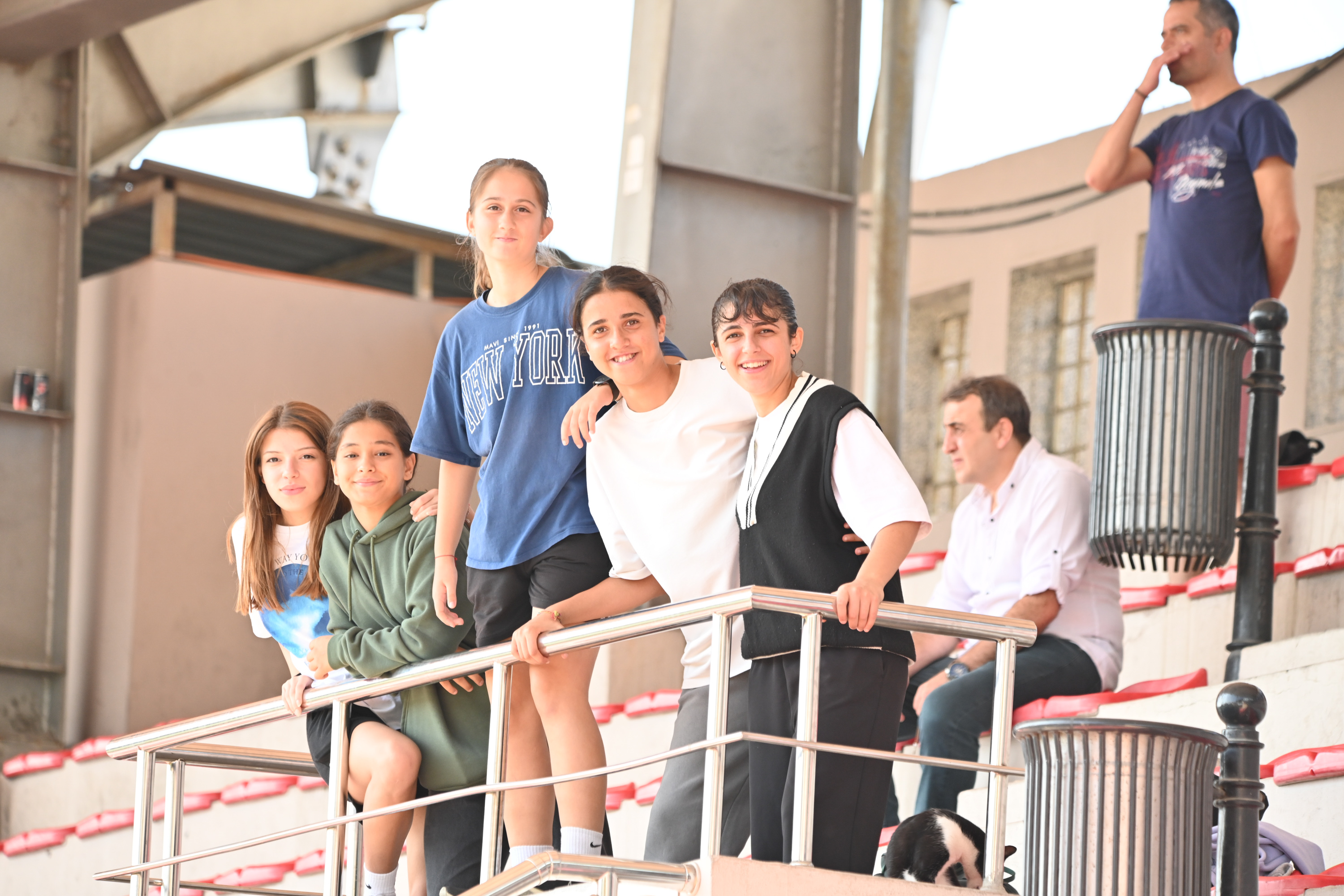
Supporters in the stadium
