= Anastasiya Kunitskaya =

Belarusian footballer

'Anastasiya Kunitskaya
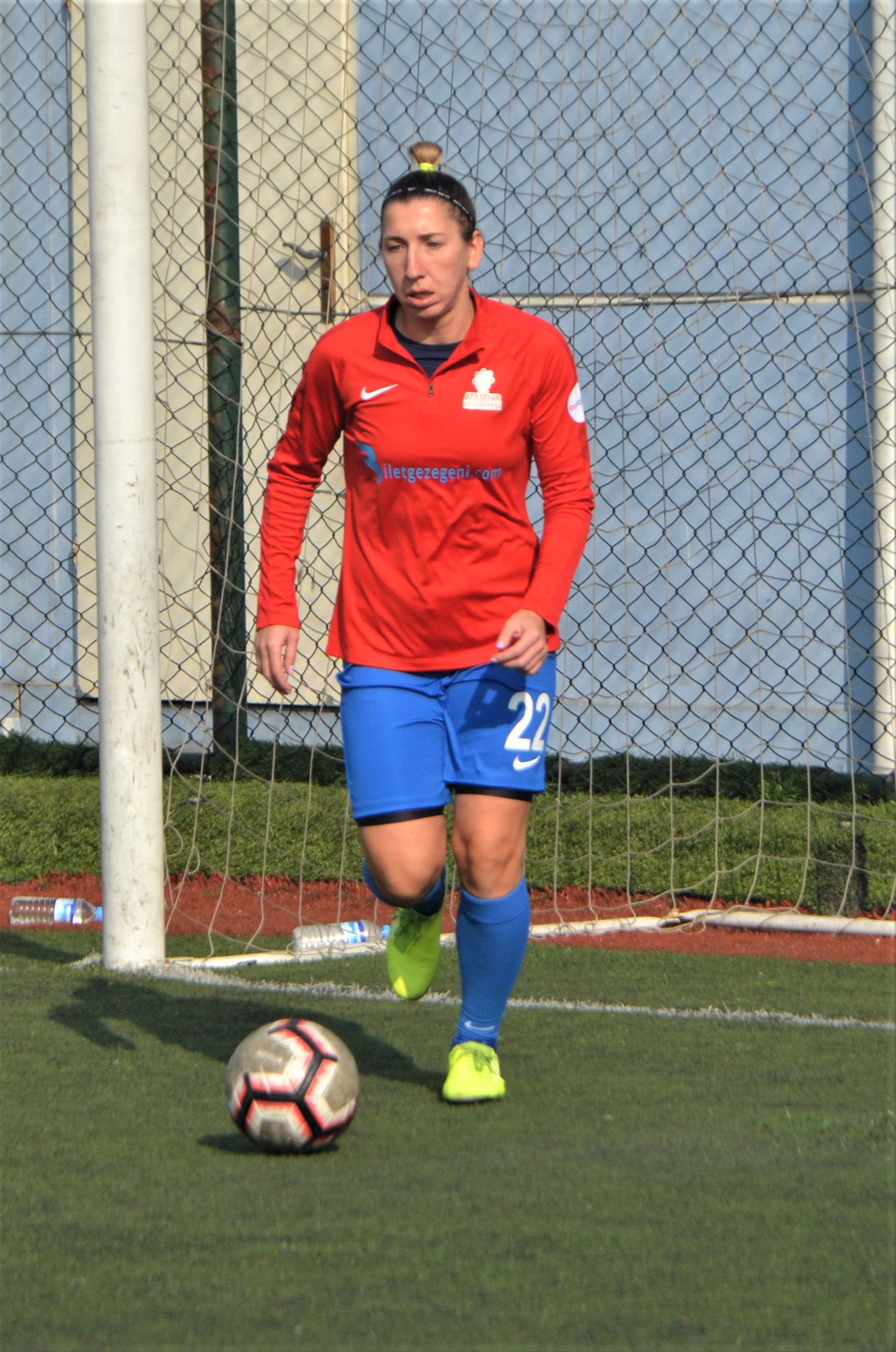
- Anastasiya Kunitskaya of Ataşehir Belediyespor (November 2019)

Personal information
- Date of birth: January 22, 1989 (age 37)
- Place of birth: Belarus
- Height: 1.68 m (5 ft 6 in)
- Position: Defender

Team information
- Current team: Horozkent Spor
- Number: 22

Senior career*
| Years | Team | Apps | (Gls) |
| 2010–2015 | Bobruichanka Bobruisk | 96 | (1) |
| 2016–2017 | Zorka-BDU | 30 | (1) |
| 2018–2019 | Bobruichanka Bobruisk | 32 | (1) |
| 2019 | Ataşehir Belediyespor | 3 | (0) |
| 2022 | Hatayspor | 16 | (0) |
| 2022–2023 | Kireçburnu Spor | 7 | (0) |
| 2023– | Horozkent Spor | 6 | (0) |

International career
| 2017– | Belarus | 4 | (0) |
- * Club domestic league appearances and goals as of 12 March 2023

Anastasiya Kunitskaya (Belarusian: Анастасія Куніцкая; born 22 January 1989) is a Belarusian women's football defender. She plays in the Turkish Women's First Football League for Horozkent Spor with jersey number 22.

== Club career ==
Kunitskaya played in her country for Bobruichanka Bobruisk between 2010 and 2015, capping in 96 matches in the Women's Premier League and scoring one goal. In that period, she appeared in 23 matches of the Women's Cup netting two goals, in two matches of the Women's Super Cup and played three games in the Women's Championship. In 2016 and 2017, she was with FC Energetik-BGU Minsk, where she scored one goal in 30 league matches. She took part in six games of the Women's Cup, in one match of the Women's Super Cup and three matches of the Women's Championships. She then returned to her home club in the 2018 league season. She scored one goal in 32 league matches, and played in five Women's Cup matches.

In the beginning of October 2019, she moved to Turkey to join the Istanbul-based top-level Turkish First League club Ataşehir Belediyespor. She left the team after capping in three matches. For the 2021–22 Turkish Super League season, she signed with Hatayspor. In the beginning of the 2022–23 Turkish Super League season, she signed with the Istanbul-based club Kireçburnu Spor. Mid January 2023 in the half of the season, she transferred to the newly-starting second-level Turkish First League club Horozkent Spor in Denizli.

== International career ==
As a member of the Belarus women's national football team, Kunitskaya took part at three qualification matches of the UEFA Women's Euro 2017, and in one match of the UEFA Women's Euro 2021 qualification round.
