= Merve Aladağ =

Turkish women's footballer

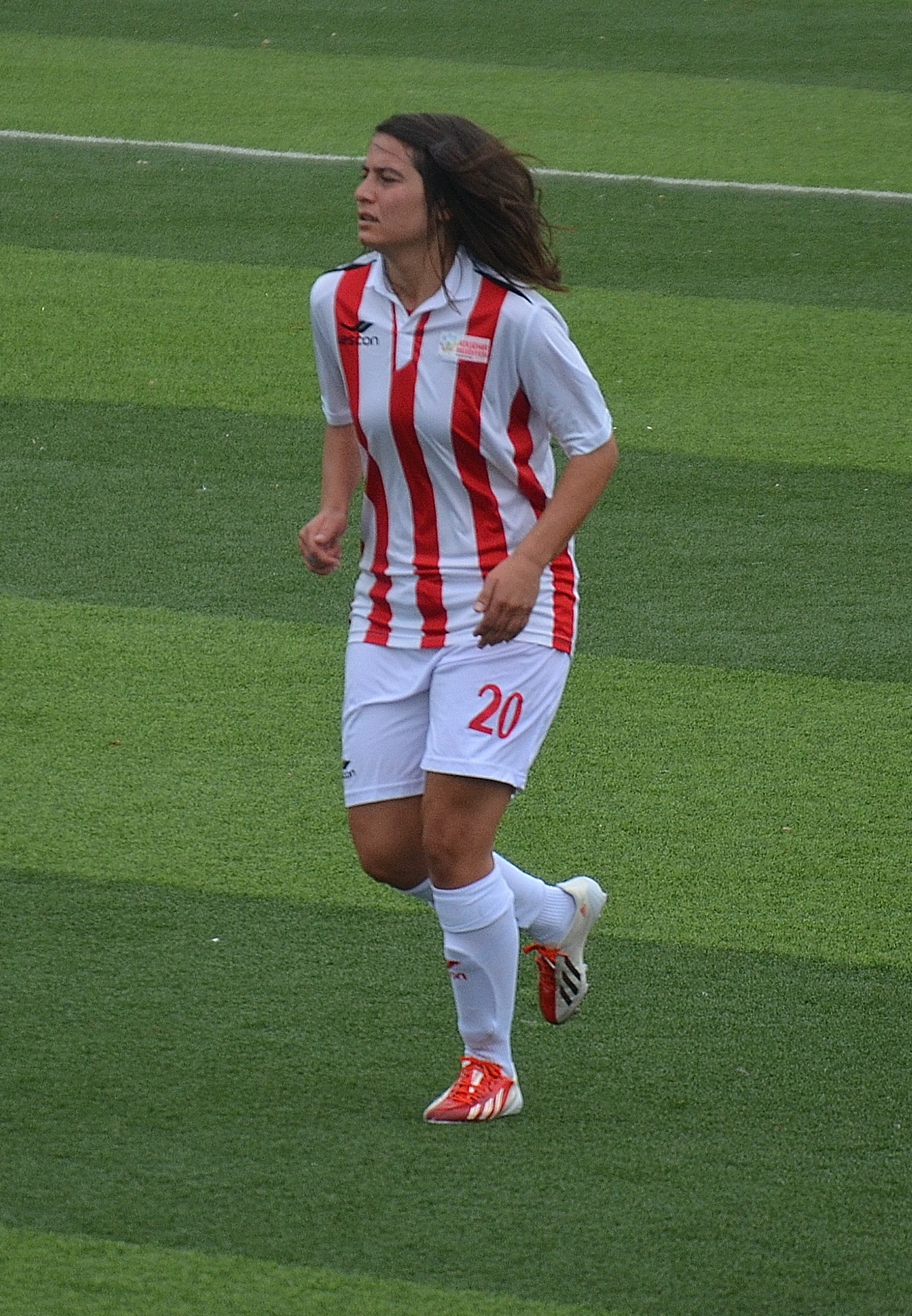
- Merve Aladağ for Ataşehir Belediyespor (October 2014)

Personal information
- Full name: Merve Aladağ
- Date of birth: 1 March 1993 (age 33)
- Place of birth: Akçadağ, Malatya, Turkey
- Position: Striker

Team information
- Current team: Kdz. Ereğli Belediye Spor
- Number: 23

Senior career*
Years	Team	Apps	(Gls)
2006–2009	Malatya Gençlik Spor	3	(2)
2009–2011	Altınşehir Lisesi Spor	27	(25)
2011–2015	Ataşehir Belediyespor	72	(62)
2016–2018	Kireçburnu Spor	43	(17)
2018–	Kdz. Ereğli Belediye Spor	28	(5)

International career^{‡}
2009	Turkey U-17	8	(1)
2009	Turkey U-19	8	(3)
2011–2012	Turkey	4	(0)
- * Club domestic league appearances and goals as of 8 March 2020 ‡ National team caps and goals as of 19 September 2012

Merve Aladağ (1 March 1993) is a Turkish footballer who plays as a striker for Turkish First League club Kdz. Ereğli Belediye Spor. With her team, she has also played the Champions League. She is a member of the Turkish national team, having made her official debut on 23 November 2011 against Romania, and as a junior international she played the 2012 U-19 European Championship.

== Playing career ==
=== Club ===
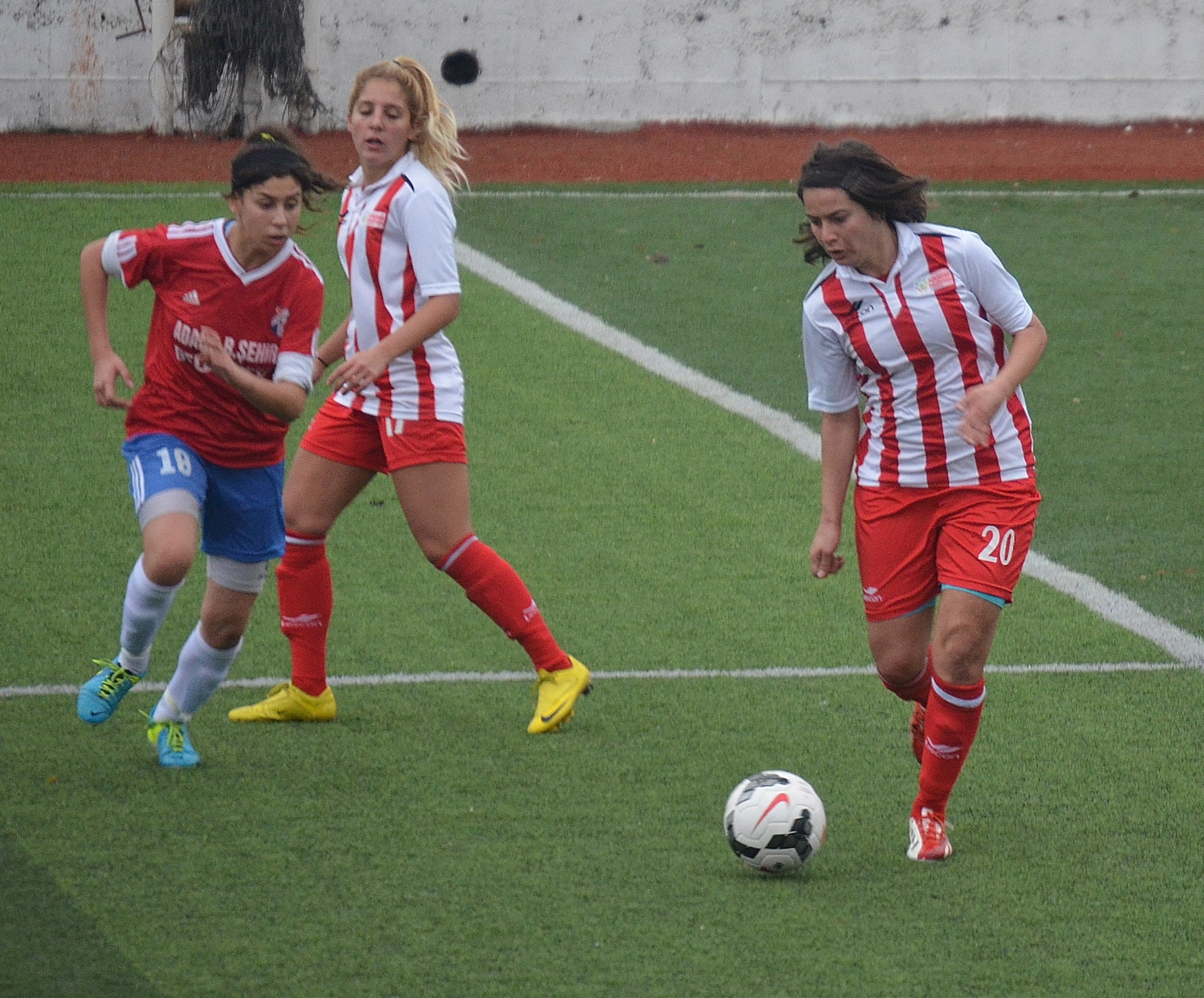
Merve Aladağ (right) playing for Ataşehir Belediyespor in the 2014–15 season home match against Adana İdmanyurduspor

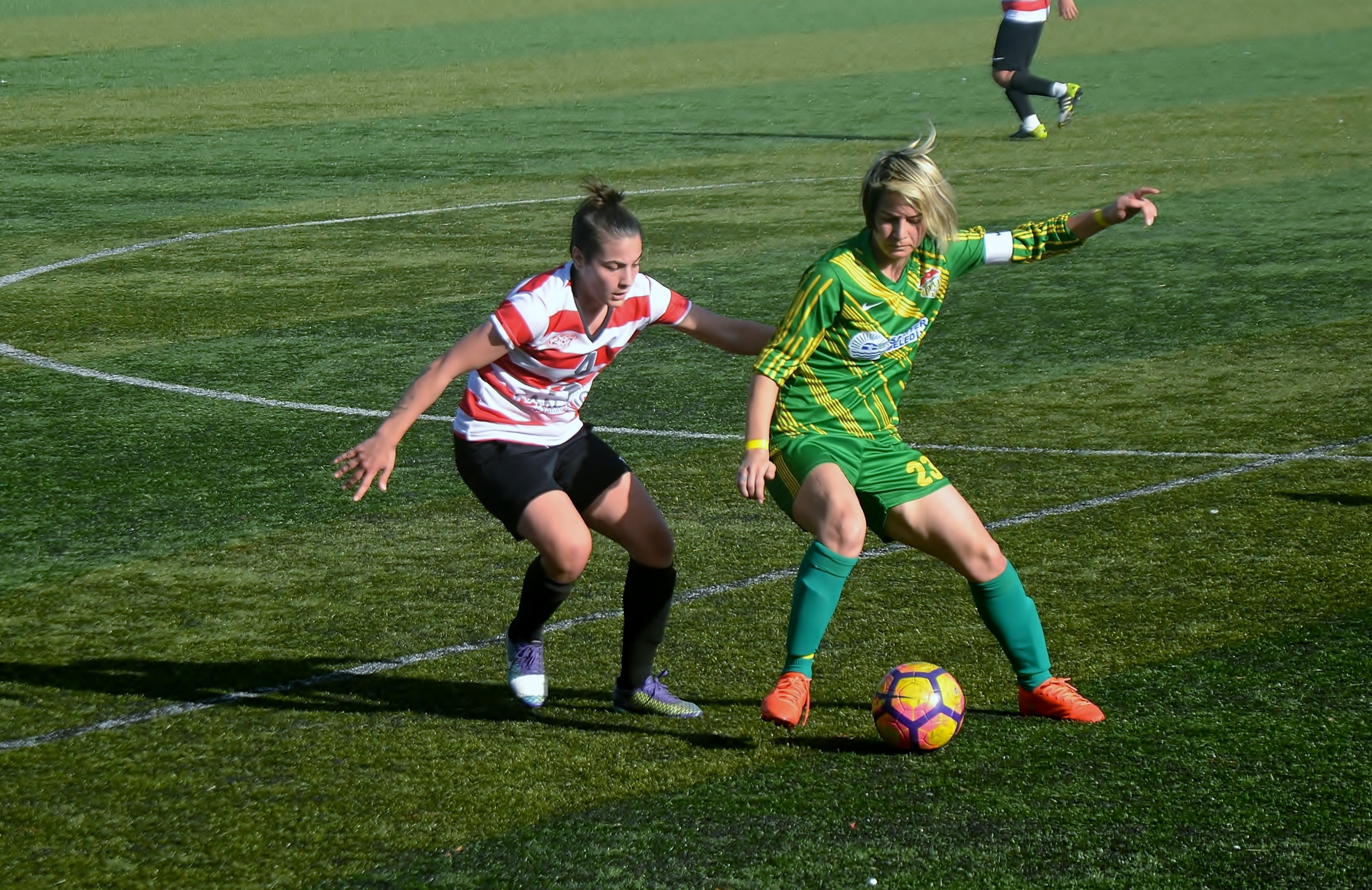
Merve Aladağ (right) playing for Kireçburnu Spor in the 2017–18 League season's home match against Ataşehir Belediyespor

Aladağ began her career in the high school team of Altınşehir Lisesi Spor, which played in the Turkish Women's Second Football League. Appeared in 17 league matches in the 2010–11 season, she scored a total of 21 goals.

The next season, she was transferred by Ataşehir Belediyesi, a club competing in the Turkish Women's First League. Aladağ netted 27 goals in 21 matches in the 2011–12 season, was named Top Scorer (Turkish: Gol kraliçesi) and enjoyed her first league championship. She played in three matches at the 2011–12 UEFA Women's Champions League and scored the only goals of her team in two matches. In the 2012–13 season, she netted 12 goals for Ataşehir Belediyesi in 17 matches.

In the beginning of the 2015–16 league season, Merve Aladağ was transferred by Kireçburnu Spor. After three seasons with the Istanbul-based club, she moved to Kdz. Ereğlispor in October 2018.

International goals
Date	Venue	Opponent	Result	Competition	Scored
Ataşehir Belediyespor
13 August 2011	Asim Ferhatović Hase Stadium Sarajevo Canton, Bosnia and Herzegovina	(Bosnia and Herzegovina) SFK 2000 Sarajevo	L 1–4	2011–12 UEFA Women's Champions League – Group 4	1
18 August 2011	Asim Ferhatović Hase Stadium Sarajevo Canton, Bosnia and Herzegovina	(Romania) CFF Olimpia Cluj	L 1–4	2011–12 UEFA Women's Champions League – Group 4	1
11 August 2012	Lendava Sports Park Lendava, Slovenia	(Lithuania) Gintra Universitetas	W 3–2	2012–13 UEFA Women's Champions League – Group 1	1

=== International ===
Aladağ made her national team debut on 23 November 2011 in the UEFA Women's Euro 2013 qualifying – Group 2 match against the Romanian team.

She played for the Turkey U-19 national team in four games, the first on 8 May 2012. She scored a goal in the friendly match against the Hungarian team on 8 May 2012.

International goals (Friendly matches not included)
Date	Venue	Opponent	Result	Competition	Scored
Turkey women's U-19
24 September 2009	Byca Arena Buca, Turkey	Georgia	W 13–0	2010 UEFA Women's U-19 Championship First qualifying round – Group 7	2

== Career statistics ==
As of 8 March 2020.

Club	Season	League			Continental		National		Total	
Club	Season	Division	Apps	Goals	Apps	Goals	Apps	Goals	Apps	Goals
Malatya Gençlik Spor	2006–2009	Second League	3	2	–	–	3	0	6	2
Malatya Gençlik Spor	Total		3	2	–	–	3	0	6	2
Altınşehir Lisesi Spor	2009–10	Second League	10	4	–	–	9	3	19	7
Altınşehir Lisesi Spor	2010–11	Second League	17	21	–	–	0	0	17	21
Altınşehir Lisesi Spor	Total		27	25	–	–	9	3	36	28
Ataşehir Belediyespor	2011–12	First League	21	27	3	2	4	1	28	30
Ataşehir Belediyespor	2012–13	First League	17	12	3	1	4	0	24	13
Ataşehir Belediyespor	2013–14	First League	14	3	–	–	0	0	14	3
Ataşehir Belediyespor	2014–15	First League	15	17	–	–	0	0	15	17
Ataşehir Belediyespor	2015–16	First League	5	3	–	–	0	0	5	3
Ataşehir Belediyespor	Total		72	62	6	3	8	1	86	66
Kireçburnu Spor	2015–16	First League	7	4	–	–	0	0	7	4
Kireçburnu Spor	2016–17	First League	19	5	–	–	0	0	19	5
Kireçburnu Spor	2017–18	First League	17	8	–	–	0	0	17	8
Kireçburnu Spor	Total		43	17	–	–	0	0	43	17
Kdz. Ereğli Belediye Spor	2018–19	First League	12	2	–	–	0	0	12	2
Kdz. Ereğli Belediye Spor	2019–20	First League	16	3	–	–	0	0	16	3
Kdz. Ereğli Belediye Spor	Total		28	5	–	–	0	0	28	5
Career total			173	111	6	3	20	4	199	118

== Honors ==
=== Club ===
Turkey Women's First Football League

Ataşehir Belediyespor
Winners (1): 2011–12
Runners-up (3): 2012–13, 2013–14, 2014–15

=== Individual ===
Turkish Women's First League
Top Scorer 2011–12 – (27 goals) with Ataşehir Belediyespor
