= Mevlüde Öztürk =

Turkish footballer (born 1988)

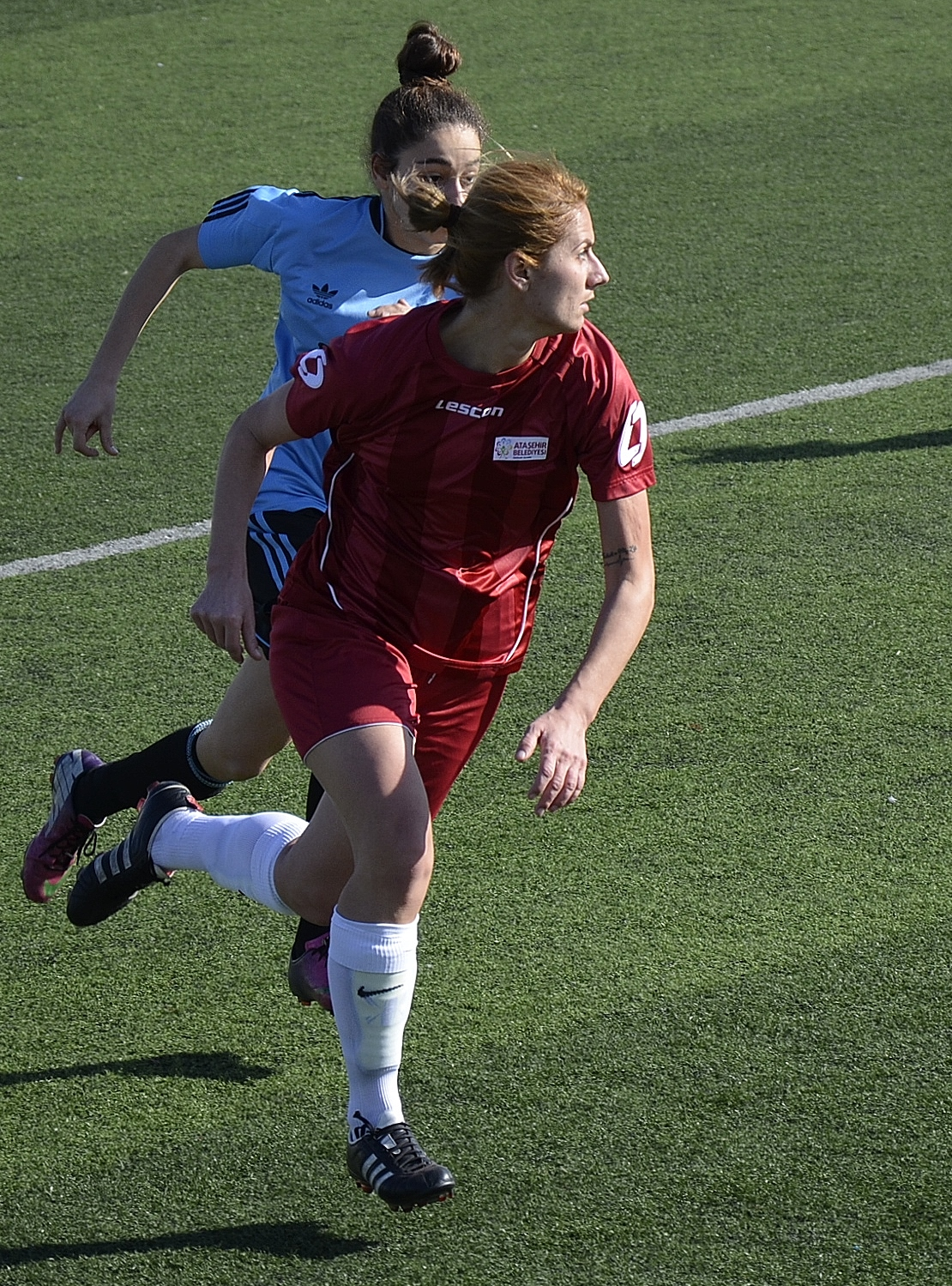
- Mevlüde Öztürk for Ataşehir Belediyespor (March 2014)

Personal information
- Date of birth: December 5, 1988 (age 37)
- Place of birth: Kartal, Istanbul, Turkey
- Position: Midfielder

Team information
- Current team: Fatih Vatan Spor
- Number: 8

Senior career*
| Years | Team | Apps | (Gls) |
| 2006–2008 | Kartalspor | | |
| 2008–2009 | Sakarya Yenikent Güneşspor | 16 | (8) |
| 2009–2012 | Lüleburgaz 39 Spor | 55 | (38) |
| 2013 | Trabzon İdmanocağı | 7 | (1) |
| 2013–2015 | Ataşehir Belediyespor | 15 | (1) |
| 2016–2017 | Fatih Vatan Spor | 21 | (2) |
| Total | | 114 | (50) |

International career^{‡}
| 2007–2009 | Turkey | 9 | (0) |
- * Club domestic league appearances and goals as of December 23, 2017 ‡ National team caps and goals as of May 16, 2009

Mevlüde Öztürk (born December 5, 1988) is a Turkish women's football midfielder, who last played in the Turkish Women's Second Football League for Fatih Vatan Spor in Istanbul with jersey number 8. She is member of the Turkey women's national team since 2006.

== Club career ==
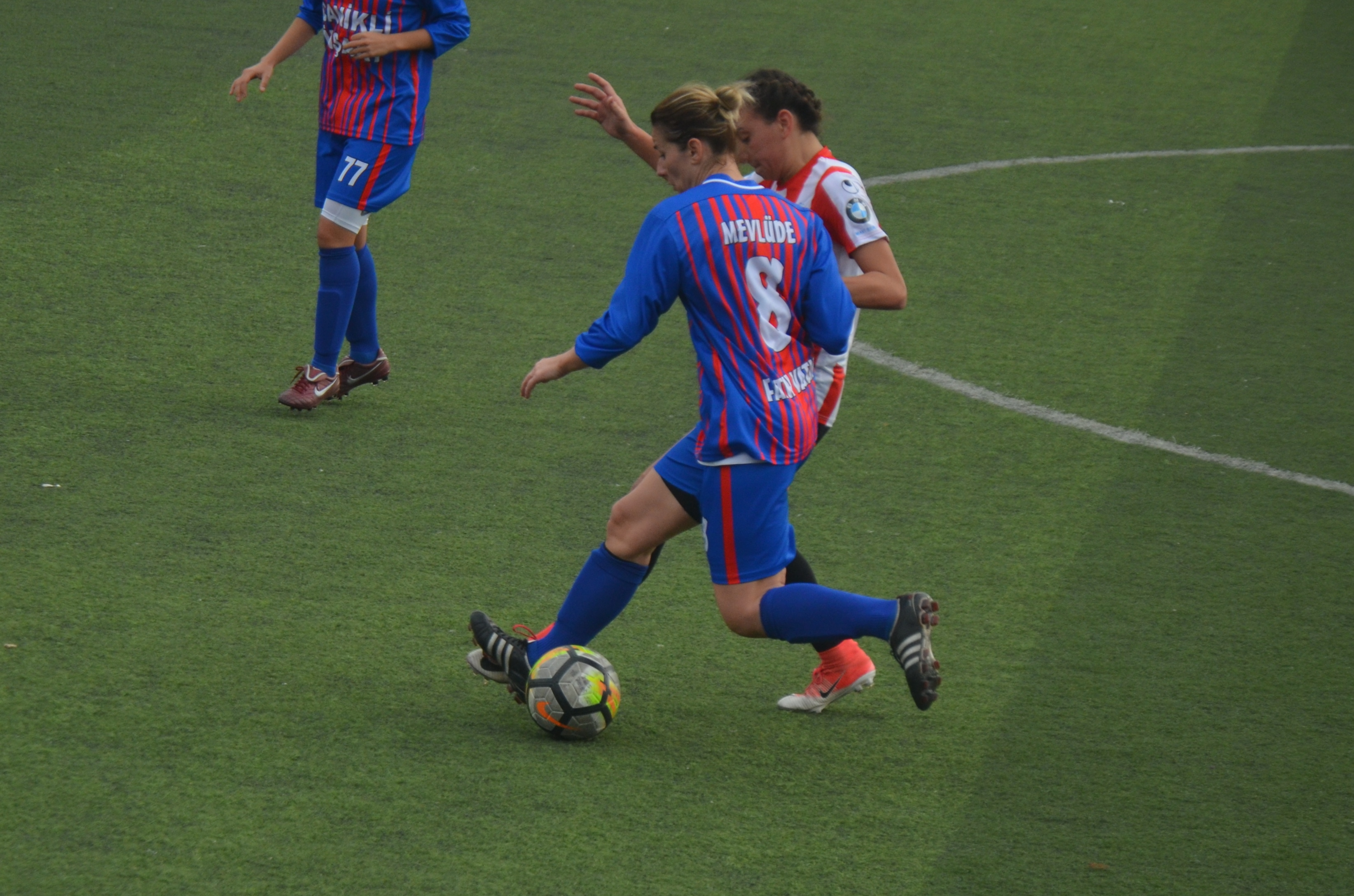
Mevlüde Öztürk playing for Fatih Vatan Spor in the away match against Ataşehir Belediyespor in the 2017–18 season.

Mevlüde Öztürk obtained her license on May 10, 2006. She played two seasons in the Second League club Kartalspor in her hometown Kartal, Istanbul. After one season with Sakarya Yenikent Güneşspor, she transferred to Lüleburgaz 39 Spor. Between 2009 and 2012, she played four seasons for the Lüleburgaz-based club, which advanced to the Turkish First League after her first season. Öztürk capped 55 times and scored 38 goals during this time. In the second half of the 2012–13, she moved to Trabzon İdmanocağı. In the 2013–14 season, she signed with Ataşehir Belediyespor. After playing two seasons with Ataşehir Belediyespor, she took a break for one year. In the beginning of the 2016–17 season, she transferred to the Second-League team Fatih Vatan Spor, which was promoted to the First league at the end of the season. She last played in the first half of the 2017-19 Women's First Leafue season. She scored a total of 50 goals in her club career's 114 matches.

== International career ==
In 2006, Öztürk was admitted to the Turkey women's national team and debuted in the friendly match against Ukraine on March 3, 2006. She took part in ten matches of the all UEFA Support International Tournament between 2007 and 2009. She capped 15 times in the women's national team.

== Career statistics ==
As of match played December 23, 2017.

| Club | Season | League | | | Continental | | National | | Total | |
| Club | Season | Division | Apps | Goals | Apps | Goals | Apps | Goals | Apps | Goals |
|---|---|---|---|---|---|---|---|---|---|---|
| Kartalspor | 2006–2008 | Second League | | | – | – | 10 | 0 | 10 | 0 |
| Kartalspor | Total | | | | – | – | 10 | 0 | 10 | 0 |
| Sakarya Yenikent Güneşspor | 2008–09 | First League | 16 | 8 | – | – | 5 | 0 | 21 | 8 |
| Sakarya Yenikent Güneşspor | Total | | 16 | 8 | – | – | 15 | 0 | 21 | 8 |
| Lüleburgaz 39 Spor | 2009–10 | Second league | 18 | 25 | – | – | 0 | 0 | 18 | 25 |
| Lüleburgaz 39 Spor | 2010–11 | First League | 19 | 8 | – | – | 0 | 0 | 19 | 8 |
| Lüleburgaz 39 Spor | 2011–12 | First League | 11 | 3 | – | – | 0 | 0 | 11 | 3 |
| Lüleburgaz 39 Spor | 2012–13 | First League | 7 | 1 | – | – | 0 | 0 | 7 | 1 |
| Lüleburgaz 39 Spor | Total | | 55 | 38 | – | – | 0 | 0 | 55 | 38 |
| Trabzon İdmanocağı | 2012–13 | First League | 7 | 1 | – | – | 0 | 0 | 7 | 1 |
| Trabzon İdmanocağı | Total | | 7 | 1 | – | – | 0 | 0 | 7 | 7 |
| Ataşehir Belediyespor | 2013–14 | First League | 12 | 1 | – | – | 0 | 0 | 12 | 1 |
| Ataşehir Belediyespor | 2014–15 | First League | 3 | 0 | – | – | 0 | 0 | 3 | 0 |
| Ataşehir Belediyespor | Total | | 15 | 1 | – | – | 0 | 0 | 15 | 1 |
| Fatih Vatan Spor | 2016–17 | Second League | 16 | 2 | – | – | 0 | 0 | 16 | 2 |
| Fatih Vatan Spor | 2017–18 | First League | 5 | 0 | – | – | 0 | 0 | 5 | 0 |
| Fatih Vatan Spor | Total | | 21 | 2 | – | – | 0 | 0 | 21 | 2 |
| Career total | | | 114 | 50 | | | 15 | 0 | 129 | 50 |

== Honours ==
Turkish Women's First Football league

Ataşehir Belediyespor
Runners-up (1): 2013-14

Turkish Women's Second Football league

Fatih Vatan Spor
Winners (1): 2016-17
