= Taner Öner =

Turkish football manager (born 1971)

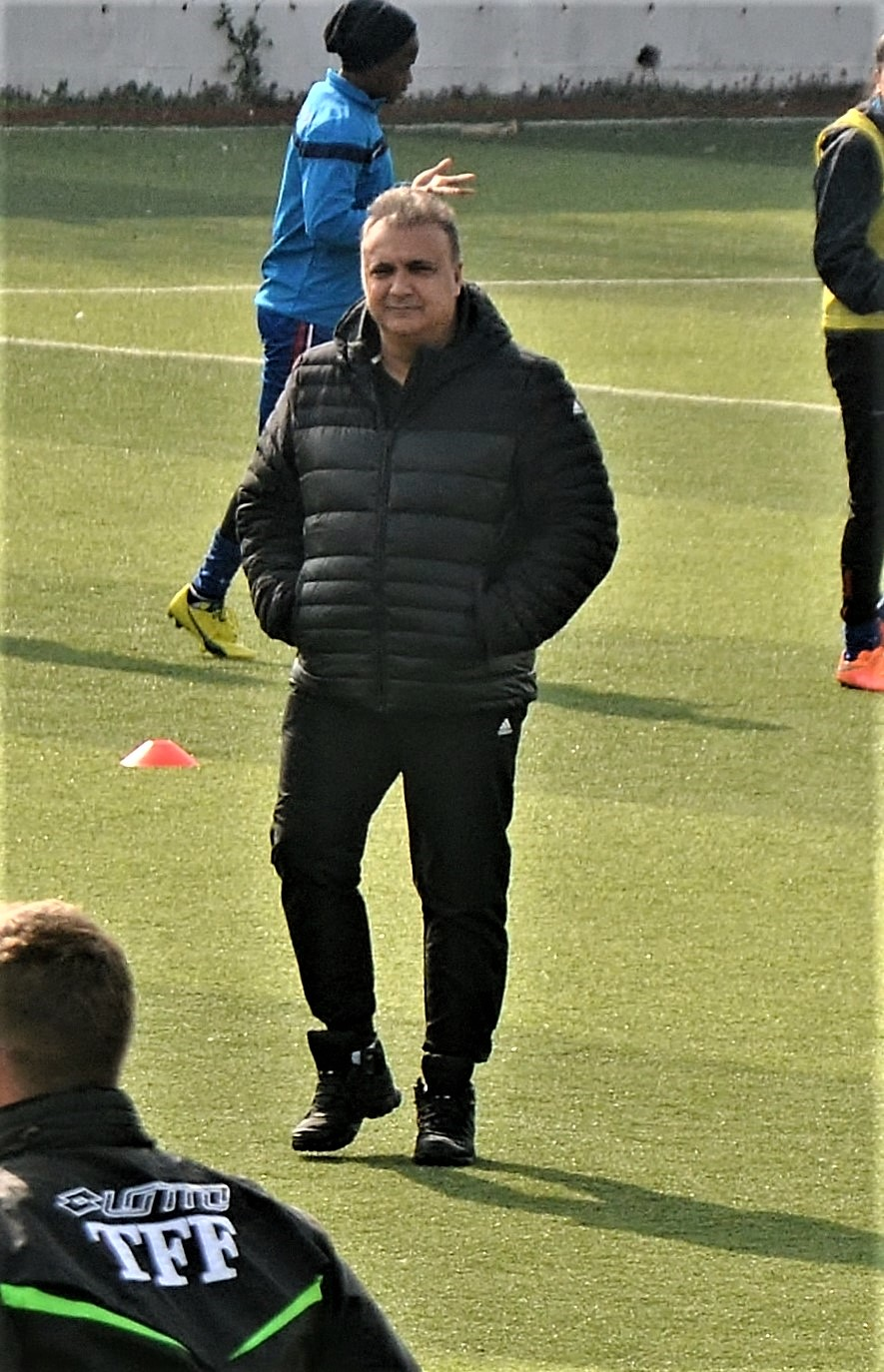
- Taner Öner (February 2018)

Personal information
- Date of birth: March 4, 1971 (age 55)
- Place of birth: Erzincan, Turkey

Team information
- Current team: Ataşehir Belediyespor

Managerial career
- Years: Team
- 2016–: Ataşehir Belediyespor

Taner Öner (born March 4, 1971) is a Turkish football manager. Currently, he serves as the manager of the Istanbul-based Ataşehir Belediyespor in the Turkish Women's First Football League.

Taner Öner was born in Erzincan, Turkey on March 4, 1971.

His team, Ataşehir Belediyespor, finished the 2016–17 Turkish Women's First League season after the play-offs in third place. In the 2017–18 season, he enjoyed the league championship with his team.

== Managerial statistics ==
As of April 18, 2018

Team	From	To	Record				
Team	From	To	G	W	D	L	Win %
Ataşehir Belediyespor
Ataşehir Belediyespor	2016	2017	26	17	5	4	65.38
Ataşehir Belediyespor	2017	2018	18	16	2	0	88.89
Total			44	33	7	4	75.00

== Honours ==
Turkish Women's First Football League

Ataşehir Belediyespor
Winners (1): 2017–18
Third places (1): 2016–17
