= Hatice Bahar Özgüvenç =

Turkish footballer and manager (born 1984)

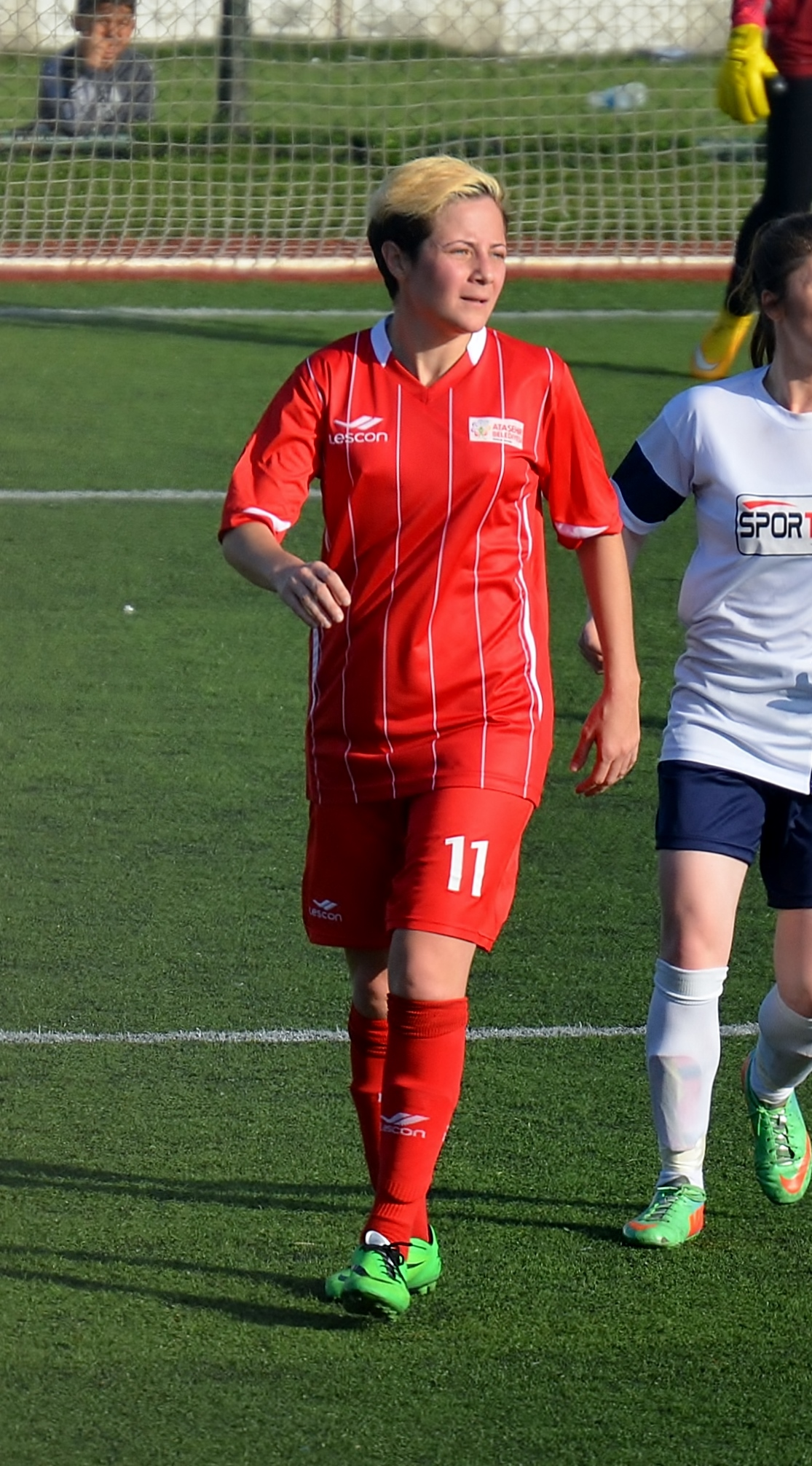
- Hatice Bahar Özgüvenç for Ataşehir (December 2014).

Personal information
- Date of birth: 10 June 1984 (age 42)
- Place of birth: Bakırköy, Istanbul, Turkey
- Position: Forward

Senior career*
Years	Team	Apps	(Gls)
1997–1999	Feriköyspor		
1999–2001	Delta Mobilyaspor	1	(1)
2001–2002	Kuzeyspor	2	(2)
2002–2006	Maltepe Yalıspor		
2006–2007	Marmara Üniversitesi Spor		
2007–2008	Zeytinburnuspor		
2008–2009	Maltepe Yalıspor	13	(6)
2009–2013	Lüleburgaz 39 Spor	48	(42)
2014–2017	Ataşehir	39	(28)
Total		103	(79)

International career^{‡}
2000–2002	Turkey U-19	14	(5)
2001–2007	Turkey	10	(4)

Managerial career
- 2020–2021: Beşiktaş
- 2021–2024: Fatih Karagümrük
- 2024–2025: Beylerbeyi
- 2025–: Trabzon
- * Club domestic league appearances and goals as of 4 June 2017 ‡ National team caps and goals as of 8 November 2007

Hatice Bahar Özgüvenç (born 10 June 1984) is a Turkish female football manager and former women's football player. She coaches Fatih Karagümrük. She was a member of the Turkish national team.

Özgüvenç serves as teacher for physical education in a primary school in Muratlı town of Tekirdağ Province.

== Club career ==
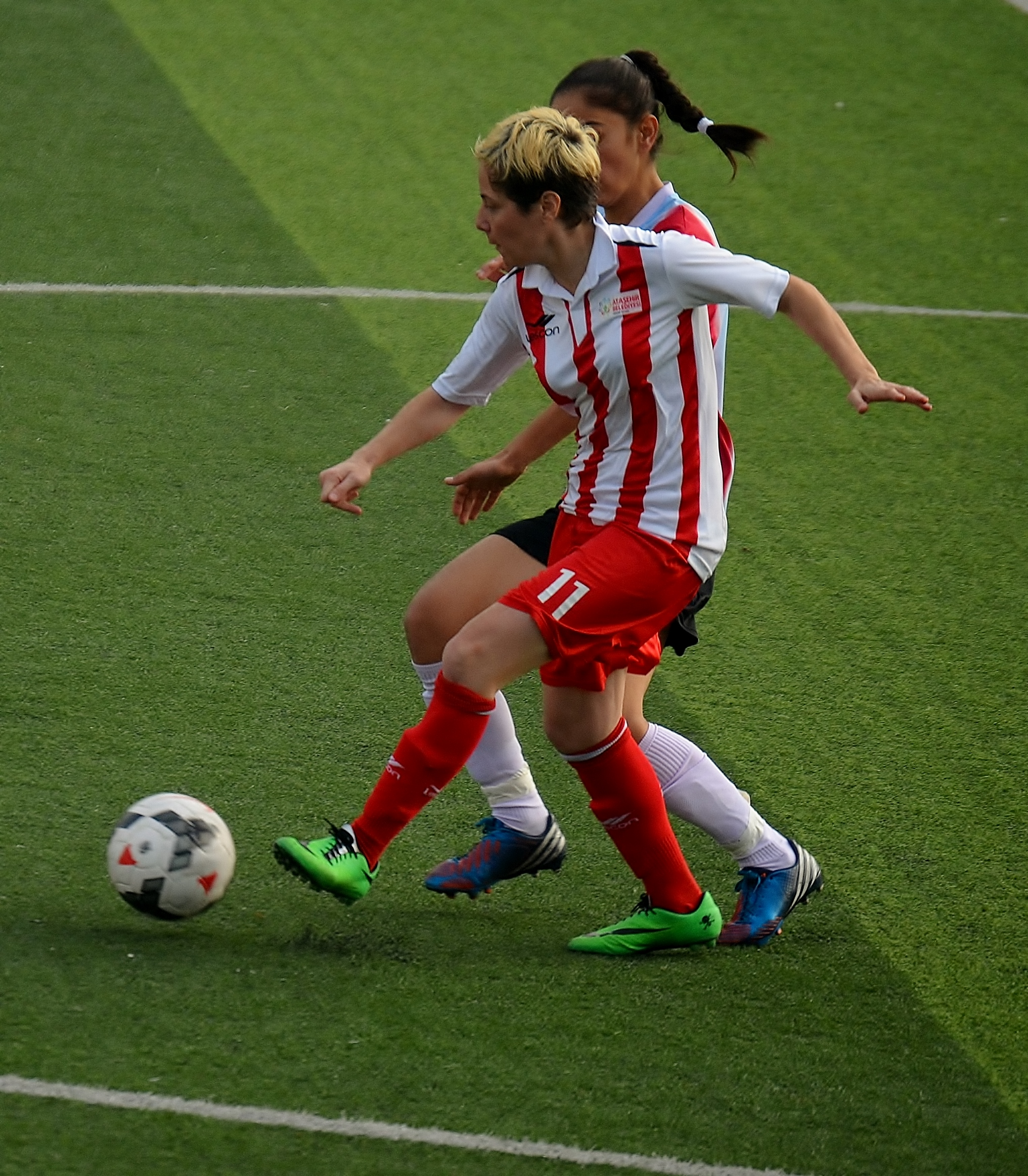
Hatice Bahar Özgüvenç playing for Ataşehir in the 2014–15 season.

Hatice Bahar Özgüvenç obtained her license for Feriköyspor on 23 October 1997. She has been playing in the Turkish Women's First League since 1999, and for Ataşehir since the 2013–14 season.

At the end of the 1999–2000 season, she enjoyed league championship with her club Delta Mabilyaspor. She played for Kuzeyspor (2001–02), Marmara Üniversitesi Spor (2006–07), Zeytinburnuspor (2007–08), Maltepe Yalıspor (2008–09), Lüleburgaz 39 Spor (2009–2013) and Ataşehir (2013–2017). After the 2016–17 First League season, she retired from active football playing at the age of 32.

== International career ==
On 20 November 2006 she scored the only goal for Turkey in the UEFA Euro 2009 qualifying – Group A1 match against Croatia. In the UEFA Support International Tournament group qualifying matches in November 2007, she netted a goal against the Bulgarian, and two goals against the Azeri women's team.

Özgüvenç took part in a special friendly football game of mixed gender held on 17 May 2011 in the BJK İnönü Stadium, Istanbul that was played on the "World Hypertension Day" in order to increase the awareness of hypertension.

As of 4 June 2017.

International goals
Date	Venue	Opponent	Result	Competition	Scored
20 November 2006	Burhanettin Kocamaz Stadium, Tarsus, Mersin, Turkey	Croatia	1–2	UEFA Euro 2009 qualifying – Group A1	1
4 November 2007	Buca Arena, Buca, İzmir Province, Turkey	Bulgaria	2–2	UEFA Support International Tournament (Group Qualifying)	1
8 November 2007	Buca Arena, Buca, İzmir Province, Turkey	Azerbaijan	4–2	UEFA Support International Tournament (Group Qualifying)	2

=== Playing career statistics ===
As of 10 January 2016.

Club	Season	League			Continental		National		Total	
Club	Season	Division	Apps	Goals	Apps	Goals	Apps	Goals	Apps	Goals
Delta Mobilyaspor	1999–2001	First League	1	1	–	–	7	1	8	2
Delta Mobilyaspor	Total		1	1	–	–	7	1	8	2
Kuzeyspor	2001–02	First League	2	2	–	–	8	2	10	4
Kuzeyspor	Total		2	2	–	–	8	2	10	4
Marmara Üniversitesi Spor	2006–07	First League			–	–	7	3	7	3
Marmara Üniversitesi Spor	Total				–	–	7	3	7	3
Zeytinburnuspor	2007–08	First League			–	–	2	3	2	3
Zeytinburnuspor	Total				–	–	2	3	2	3
Maltepe Yalıspor	2008–09	First League	13	6	–	–	0	0	13	6
Maltepe Yalıspor	Total		13	6	–	–	0	0	13	6
Lüleburgaz 39 Spor	2009–10	First League	18	24	–	–	0	0	18	24
Lüleburgaz 39 Spor	2010–11	First League	17	10	–	–	0	0	7	10
Lüleburgaz 39 Spor	2012–13	First League	13	8	–	–	0	0	13	8
Lüleburgaz 39 Spor	Total		48	42	–	–	0	0	48	42
Ataşehir	2013–14	First League	2	2	–	–	0	0	2	2
Ataşehir	2014–15	First League	16	8	–	–	0	0	16	8
Ataşehir	2015–16	First League	18	18	–	–	0	0	25	18
Ataşehir	2016–17	First League	3	0	–	–	0	0	3	0
Ataşehir	Total		39	28	–	–	0	0	39	28
Career total			103	79	–	–	24	9	127	88

== Managerial career ==
By September 2020, Özgüvenç was appointed manager of the Beşiktaş J.K. In the 2020–21 Turkcell League season, her team won the champion title after defeating Fatih Vatan Spor in the play-off final match.

By October 2021, Özgüvenç was appointed as a manager of the newly established women's team of Fatih Karagümrük. She mede her team runners-up in their first season in the 2021-22 Super League. She served three seasons at the team. In the beginning of the 2024-25 Super League season, her team was folded, and she transferred to Beylerbeyi.

In the beginning of September 2025, she was appointed head coach of the Super League club Trabzon.

=== Managerial career statistics ===
As of 5 October 2025.

Team	From	To	Record				
Team	From	To	G	W	D	L	Win %
Beşiktaş
Beşiktaş	2020	2021	6	6	0	0	100.00
Fatih Karagümrük
Fatih Karagümrük	2021	2022	27	18	6	3	66.67
Fatih Karagümrük	2022	2023	20	12	4	4	60.00
Fatih Karagümrük	2023	2024	30	15	7	8	50.00
Fatih Karagümrük	Total		77	45	17	15	58.44
Beyletbeyi	2024	2025	26	15	3	8	57.69
Trabzon	2025	2026	3	2	0	1	66.67
Career Total			112	68	20	24	60.71

== Honours ==
=== Player ===
Turkish Women's Football First League

Delta Mabilya
Winners (1): 1999–2000

Ataşehir
Runners-up (3): 2013–14, 2014–15, 2015–16
Third places (1): 2016–17

=== Manager ===
Turkish Women's Football First League

Beşiktaş
Winners (1): 2020–21
Fatih Karagümrük
Runners up (1): 2021-22
