= Corina Luijks =

Dutch footballer

Personal information
- Full name: Corina Cornella Johanna Cathari Luijks
- Date of birth: 20 November 1995 (age 30)
- Place of birth: Lepelstraat, Bergen op Zoom, Netherlands
- Position: Forward

Team information
- Current team: Como 1907

Senior career*
Years	Team	Apps	(Gls)
2013–2014	RSC Anderlecht	3	(0)
2014–2015	PSV Eindhoven		
2015–2016	Lierse SK		
2017–2018	Excelsior Rotterdam	21	(2)
2018–2020	A.S.D. Pink Sport Time	18	(4)
2020–2021	S.V. Zulte Waregem	6	(2)
2021–2022	ASJ Soyaux	10	(1)
2022–2023	Fatih Karagümrük S.K.	1	(0)
2023–2024	Al Shabab	7	(2)
2024–2025	Como 1907		

International career^{‡}
2018–	Netherlands Futsal	3	(1)
- * Club domestic league appearances and goals as of 16 October 2022 ‡ National team caps and goals as of 26 October 2024

Corina Cornella Johanna Cathari Luijks (born 20 November 1995) is a Dutch women's association footballer who plays as a forward for Como 1907 and the Netherlands women's national futsal team.

== Private life ==
Born on 20 November 1995, Luijks is a native of Lepelstraat, Bergen op Zoom, Netherlands.

== Club career ==
Corina Luijks played for the Belgian RSC Anderlecht in Anderlecht capping in three matches during the 2013–14 BeNe League season. The next season, she returned home to join PSV Eindhoven. In the 2015–16 season, she again moved to Belgium, and was with Lierse SK. In the 2017–18 season, she was with her home country's Excelsior Rotterdam in Rotterdam, where she scored two goals in 21 matches of the Eredivisie. In the 2018–19 season, she moved to Iyaly to play for the Bari-based club A.S.D. Pink Sport Time in the Serie B. She scored three goals in ten matches, and the next season, she appeared in eight games netting one goal. She then returned home, and signed with S.V. Zulte Waregem, where she appeared in six matches and netted two goals. In the 2021–2022 season, she went to Soyaux, France to play for the local club ASJ Soyaux, where she scored one goal in ten matches. In October 2022, Luijks moved to Turkey, and joined Fatih Karagümrük S.K. in Istanbul to play in the 2022–23 Super League. In August 2023, she joined Saudi club Al Shabab.

== International career ==
Luijks was selected to the Netherlands women's national futsal team in 2018.
