= Nagehan =

Nagehan, aka Nagihan, is a Turkish feminine given name. People named "Nagehan" include:

== Nagehan ==
- Nagehan Akşan (born 1988), Turkish women's footballer
- Nagehan Malkoç (born 1985), Turkish female boxer

== Nagihan ==
- Nagihan Avanaş (born 1997), Turkish women's footballer
- Nagihan Karadere (born 1984), Turkish sprint runner
