= Başak Gündoğdu =

Turkish association football player

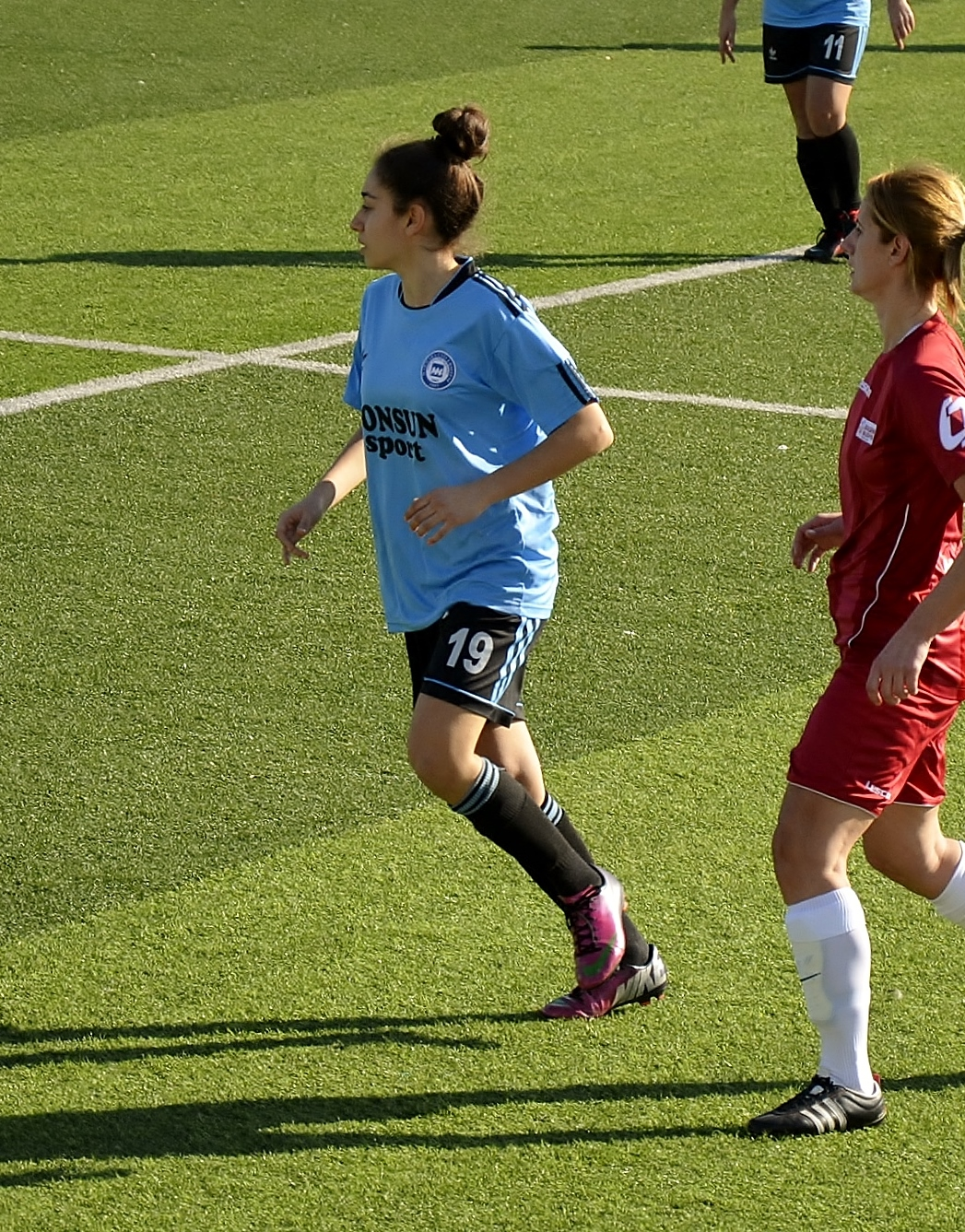
- Başak Gündoğdu for Marmara Üniversitesi Spor in the 2013–14 season.

Personal information
- Date of birth: 23 April 1992 (age 34)
- Place of birth: Şişli, Istanbul, Turkey
- Position: Forward

Team information
- Current team: Beşiktaş
- Number: 15

Senior career*
Years	Team	Apps	(Gls)
2006–2011	Marmara Üniversitesi Spor	14	(7)
2011–2013	Çamlıcaspor	34	(15)
2013–2014	Marmara Üniversitesi Spor	8	(3)
2014–2015	Ataşehir Belediyespor	3	(0)
2015–	Beşiktaş	118	(56)

International career^{‡}
2006–2007	Turkey U-17	4	(0)
2016–2019	Turkey	9	(0)
- * Club domestic league appearances and goals as of 9 March 2022 ‡ National team caps and goals as of 11 November 2019

Başak Gündoğdu (born 23 April 1992) is a Turkish women's football forward currently playing in the Turkish Women's First League for Beşiktaş with jersey number 15. She played in the Turkish girls' U-17, and plays for the Turkey women's team.

== Club career ==
Gündoğdu obtained her license for Marmara Üniversitesi Spor on 4 May 2006. She played three seasons between 2008 and 2010 for her club. Then, she was two seasons with Çamlıcaspor. In the 2013–14 season, she returned to her initial club. At the end of the season, she took part at three play-off matches for Ataşehir Belediyespor. She signed with beşiktaş J.K., which played in the Third League. She enjoyed league championship titles and promotions to a higher league with her new club at the end of 2014–15 and 2015–16. She became top scorer in the 2015–16 Women's Second league season with 19 goals sharing the title with İlayda Civelek of Amasya Eğitim Spor. She enjoyed the champion title of her team Beşiktaş J.K. in the 2018–19 season. She took part at the 2019–20 UEFA Women's Champions League - Group 9 matches. Following her team's champions title in the 2020-21 Turkcell League season, she played in one match of the 2021–22 UEFA Women's Champions League qualifying rounds.

== International career ==
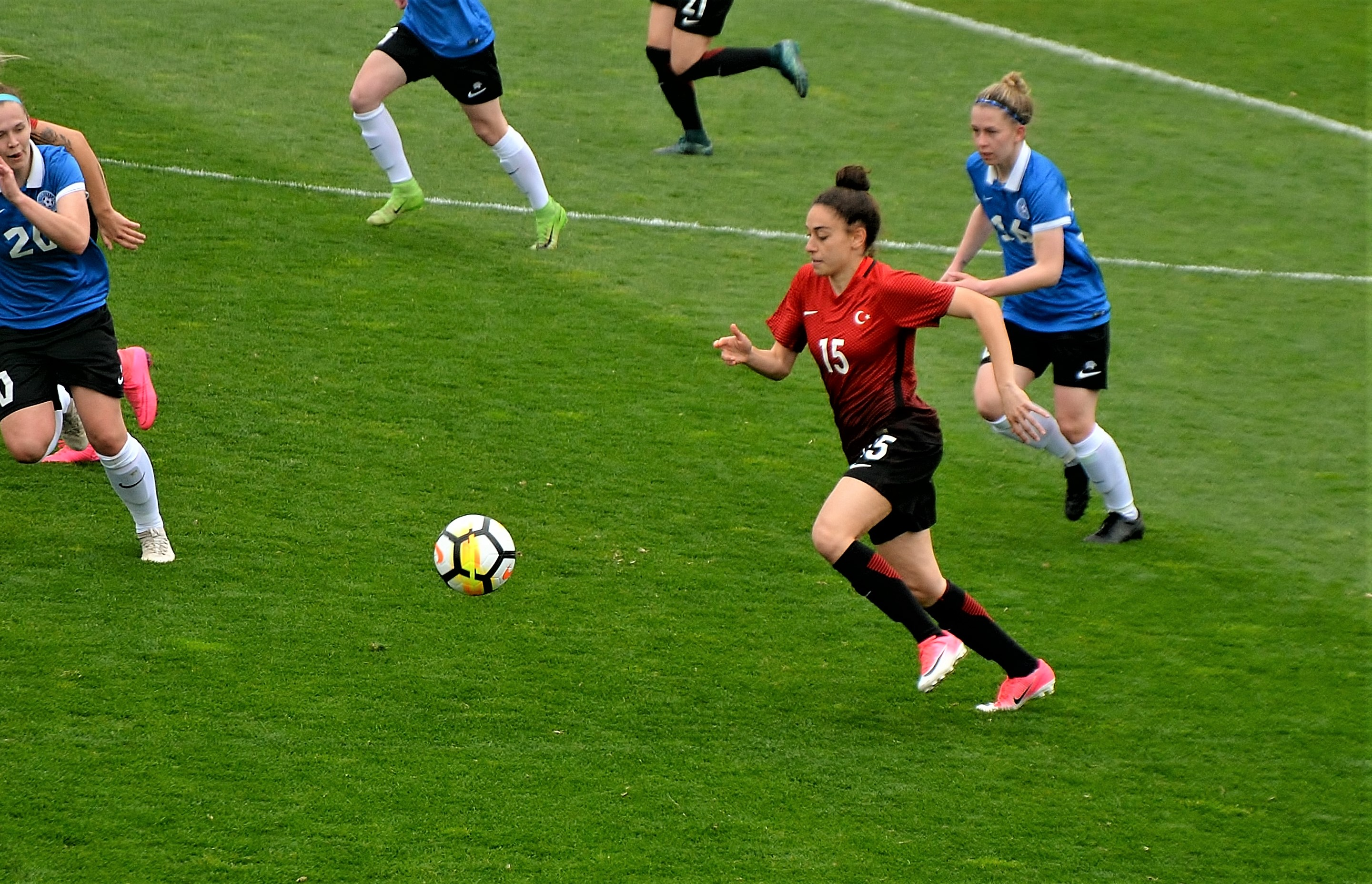
Başak Gündoğdu (red/black) attacking Estonia for Turkey national in the friendly match at TFF Riva Facility on April 7, 2018.

Gündoğdu appeared in four friendly matches for national U-17 team in 2006 and 2007. She played in one game of the UEFA Euro 2017 qualifying round.

== Career statistics ==
As of 23 October 2022.

Club	Season	League			Continental		National		Total	
Club	Season	Division	Apps	Goals	Apps	Goals	Apps	Goals	Apps	Goals
Marmara Üniversitesi Spor	2006–08		0	0	–	–	4	0	4	0
Marmara Üniversitesi Spor	2008–09	First League	5	5	–	–	0	0	5	5
Marmara Üniversitesi Spor	2009–10	First League	2	1	–	–	0	0	2	1
Marmara Üniversitesi Spor	2010–11	First League	7	1	–	–	0	0	7	1
Marmara Üniversitesi Spor	Total		14	7	–	–	4	0	18	7
Çamlicaspor	2011–12	First League	19	7	–	–	0	0	19	7
Çamlicaspor	2012–13	First League	15	8	–	–	0	0	15	8
Çamlicaspor	Total		34	15	–	–	0	0	34	15
Marmara Üniversitesi Spor	2013–14	First League	8	3	–	–	0	0	8	3
Marmara Üniversitesi Spor	Total		8	3			0	0	8	3
Ataşehir Belediyespor	2013–14	First League	3	0	–	–	0	0	3	0
Ataşehir Belediyespor	Total		3	0	–	–	0	0	3	0
Beşiktaş J.K.	2014–15	Third League	7	11	–	–	0	0	7	11
Beşiktaş J.K.	2015–16	Second League	18	19	–	–	1	0	19	19
Beşiktaş J.K.	2016–17	First League	23	7	–	–	3	0	26	7
Beşiktaş J.K.	2017–18	First League	16	4	–	–	2	0	18	4
Beşiktaş J.K.	2018–19	First League	17	5	–	–	2	0	19	5
Beşiktaş J.K.	2019–20	First League	13	3	3	0	1	0	17	3
Beşiktaş J.K.	2020–21	First League	6	2	-	-	0	0	6	2
Beşiktaş J.K.	2021–22	Super League	16	3	1	0	0	0	17	3
Beşiktaş J.K.	2022–23	Super League	2	2	0	0	0	0	2	2
Beşiktaş J.K.	Total		118	56	4	0	9	0	131	56
Career total			177	81	4	0	13	0	194	81

== Honours ==
=== Club ===
Turkish Women's First League

Ataşehir Belediyespor
Runners-up (1): 2013–14

Beşiktaş J.K.
Winners (2): 2018–19, 2020–21
Runners-up (2): 2016–17, 2017–18

Turkish Women's Second League

Beşiktaş J.K.
Winners (1): 2015–16

Turkish Women's Third League

Beşiktaş J.K.
Winners (1): 2014–15

=== Individual ===
Turkish Women's Second League
Top scorer (1): 2015–16 with Beşiktaş J.K. (19 goals).
