= Fatih Karagümrük S.K. (women's football) =

Fatih Karagümrük
- Full name: Fatih Karagümrük Spor Kulübü
- Nicknames: Kara Kırmızı (Black Red); Fatih'in Torunları (Fatih's grandchildren)
- Founded: 2 October 2021; 4 years ago
- Ground: Vefa Stadium
- Capacity: 6,000
- Owner: Süleyman Hurma
- President: Süleyman Hurma
- Head coach: Bahar Özgüvenç
- League: Turkish Women's Football Super League
- 2023–24: Turkish Women's Football Super League, 7th of 24
- Website: www.karagumruk.com
Home colours	Away colours	Third colours

Fatih Karagümrük Spor Kulübü Kadın Futbol Takımı, also known as Wulfz Fatih Karagümrük, is a Turkish football team as part of the Fatih Karagümrük S.K. based in the Karagümrük neighbourhood of the Fatih district in Istanbul. Established on 2 October 2021, the red-black colored team currently play in the Turkish Women's Football Super League, the top tier of women's football in Turkey.

== History ==
The women's football section of the club was formed after the Turkish Football Federation established the Turkish Women's Football Super League replacing Turkish Women's First Football League in 2021, and appealed to the major men's football clubs in the Süper Lig to participate in the women's football. The women's football team of Fatih Karagümrük S.K. is one of the eight new formed teams, which joined the 2021–22 Turkish Women's Football Super League for the first time. The team is sponsored by the second-hand car dealer Vavacars. By February 2022 after eight league rounds, sports kit company Wulfz became the new sponsor.

== Stadium ==
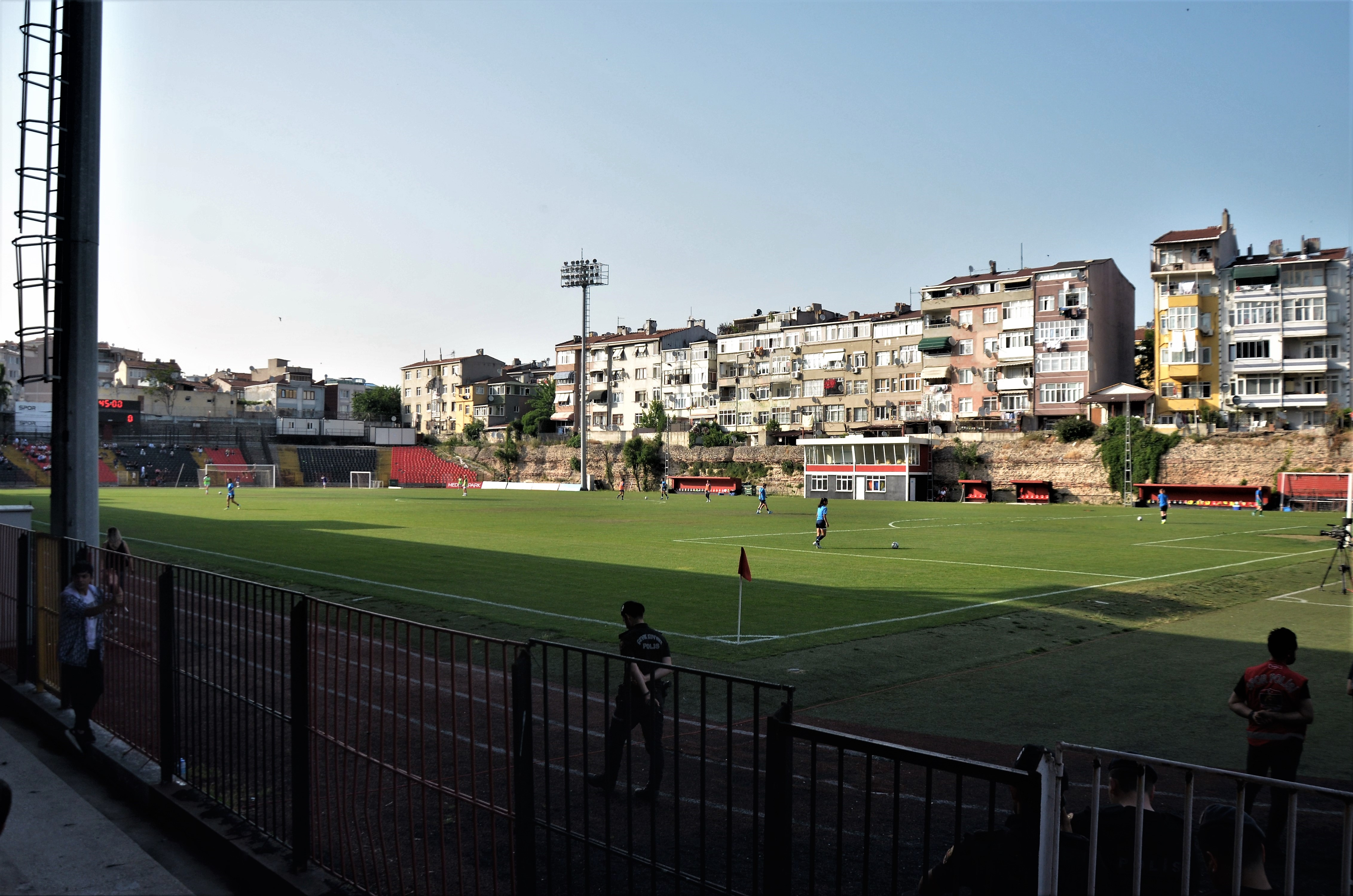
Vefa Stadium

Fatih Karagümrük women's team play their home matches at Vefa Stadium, which is situated in the Karagümrük neighborhood and also called Karagümrük Stadium. It is owned by the Ministry of Youth and Sports and operated by Fatih Karagümrük S.K.

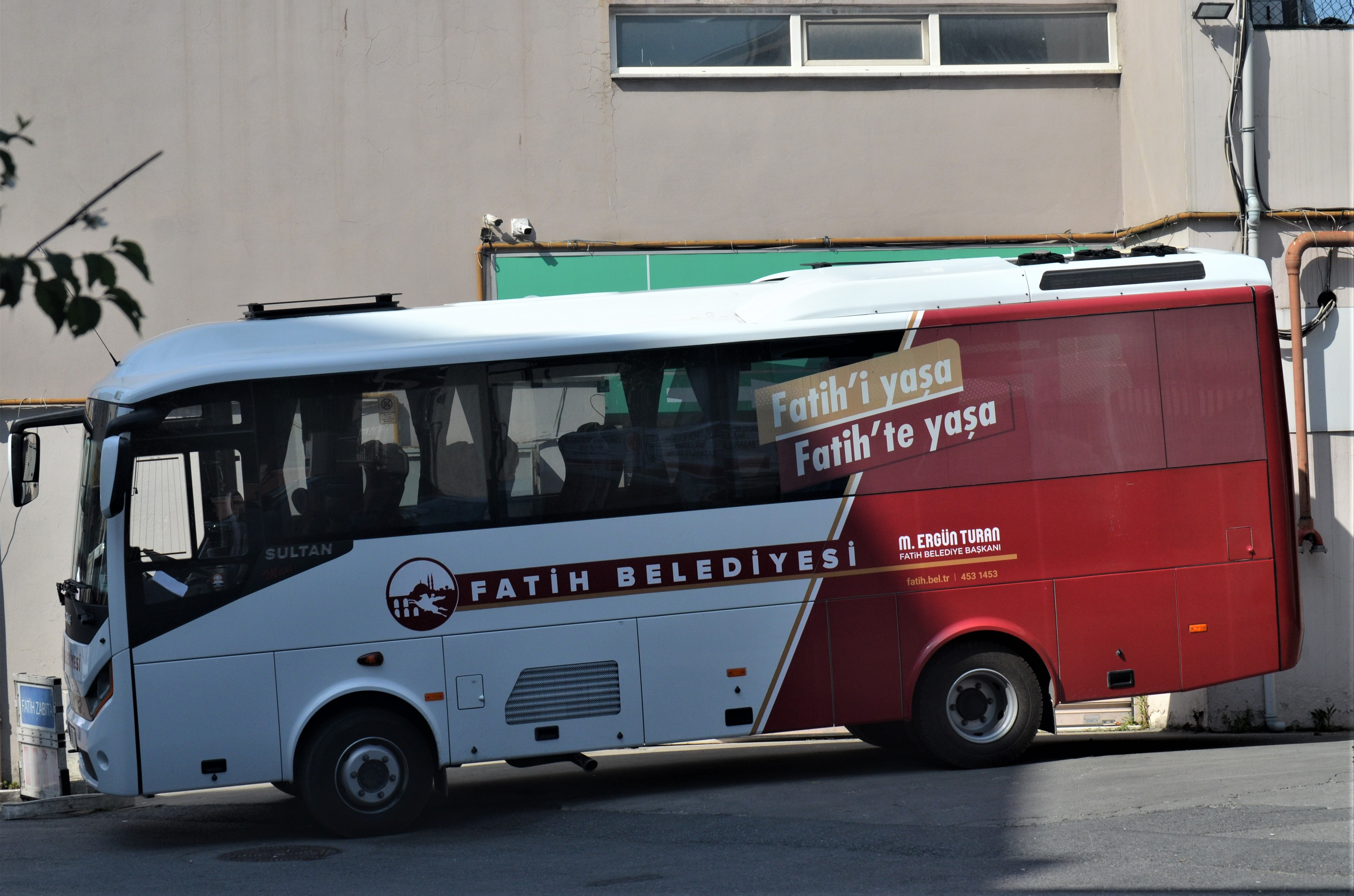
Team bus of Fatih Karagümrük women's.

== Statistics ==
As of 16 October 2022.

Season	League	Rank	Pld	W	D	L	GF	GA	GD	Pts
2021-22	Super League Gr. B	2 (^{1})	27	18	6	3	58	20	+38	60
2022-23	Super League Gr. A	2 (^{2})	1	1	0	0	2	0	+2	3
Green marks a season followed by promotion, red a season followed by relegation.

- (^{1}): League runner-up after Group leadership and play-offs
- (^{2}): Season in progress

== Current squad ==
As of 16 October 2022

- Head coach: (Turkey) Hatice Bahar Özgüvenç

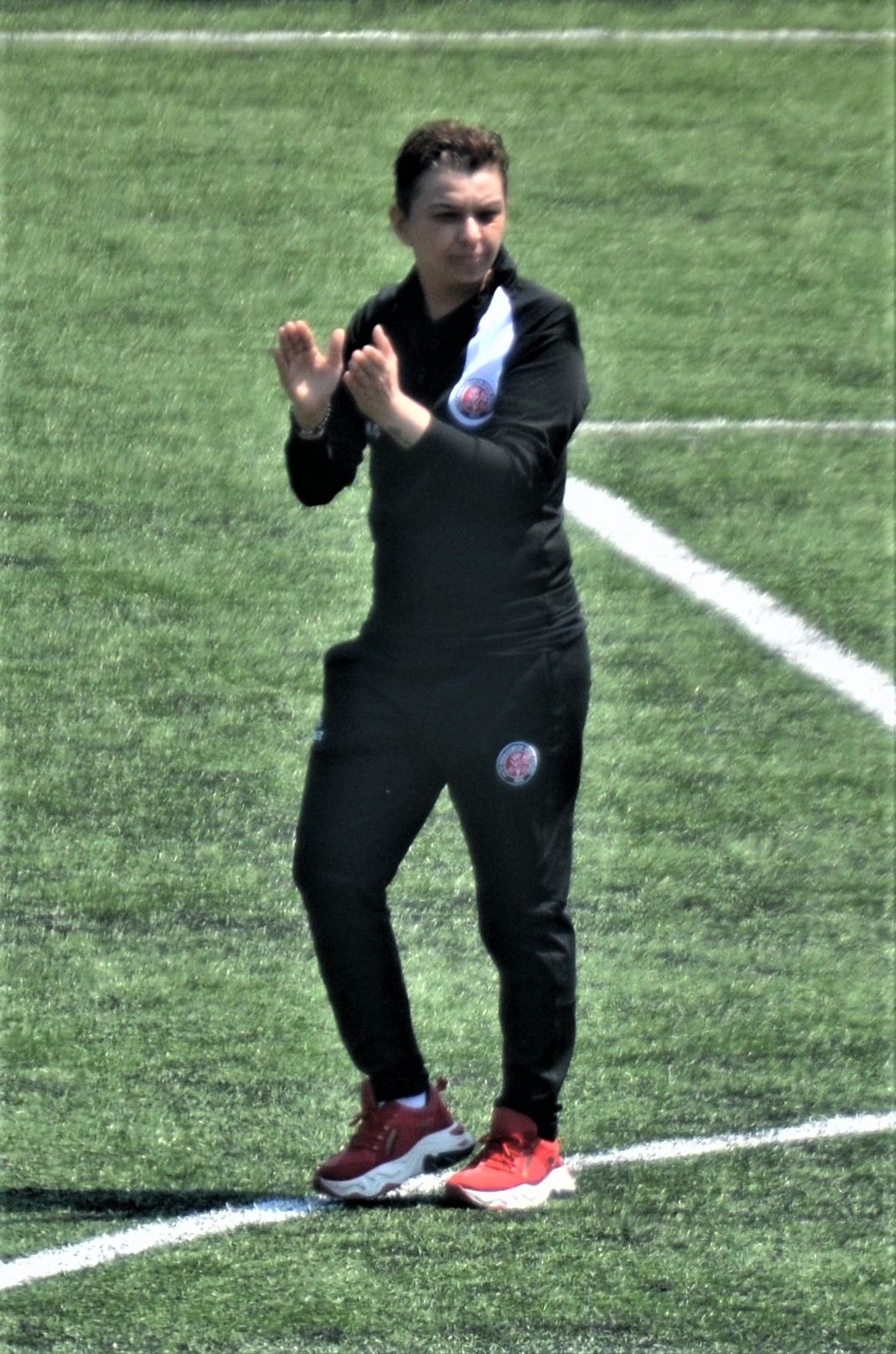
Coach Hatice Bahar Özgüvenç in the 2021-22 Super League play-offs.

Note: Flags indicate national team as defined under FIFA eligibility rules; some limited exceptions apply. Players may hold more than one non-FIFA nationality.

No.	Pos.	Nation	Player
1	GK	TUR	Duygu Yılmaz
44	GK	TUR	Ayşe Nur Göktürk
3	DF	CIV	Rita Akaffou
4	DF	BFA	Madinatou Rouamba
5	DF	TUR	Çiğdem Belci
19	DF	TUR	Sümeyra Kıvanç
24	DF	TUR	Nazlı Örnek
7	MF	GEO	Tatiana Matveeva
10	MF	MLI	Saratou Traoré
55	MF	TUR	Elif Keskin

No.	Pos.	Nation	Player
74	MF	TUR	Songül Demirtürk
14	FW	NED	Corina Luijks
18	FW	TUR	Şilan Aykoç
21	FW	TUR	Nagihan Avanaş
8		TUR	Şevval Dursun
13		TUR	Buse Uçan
20		TUR	Ayşe Soylu
21		TUR	Ece Selen Terzioğlu
28		TUR	Ceren Konar
60		TUR	Nurcan Yağcı

== Kit history ==
2021-22 home	2021-22 away

== Squads ==
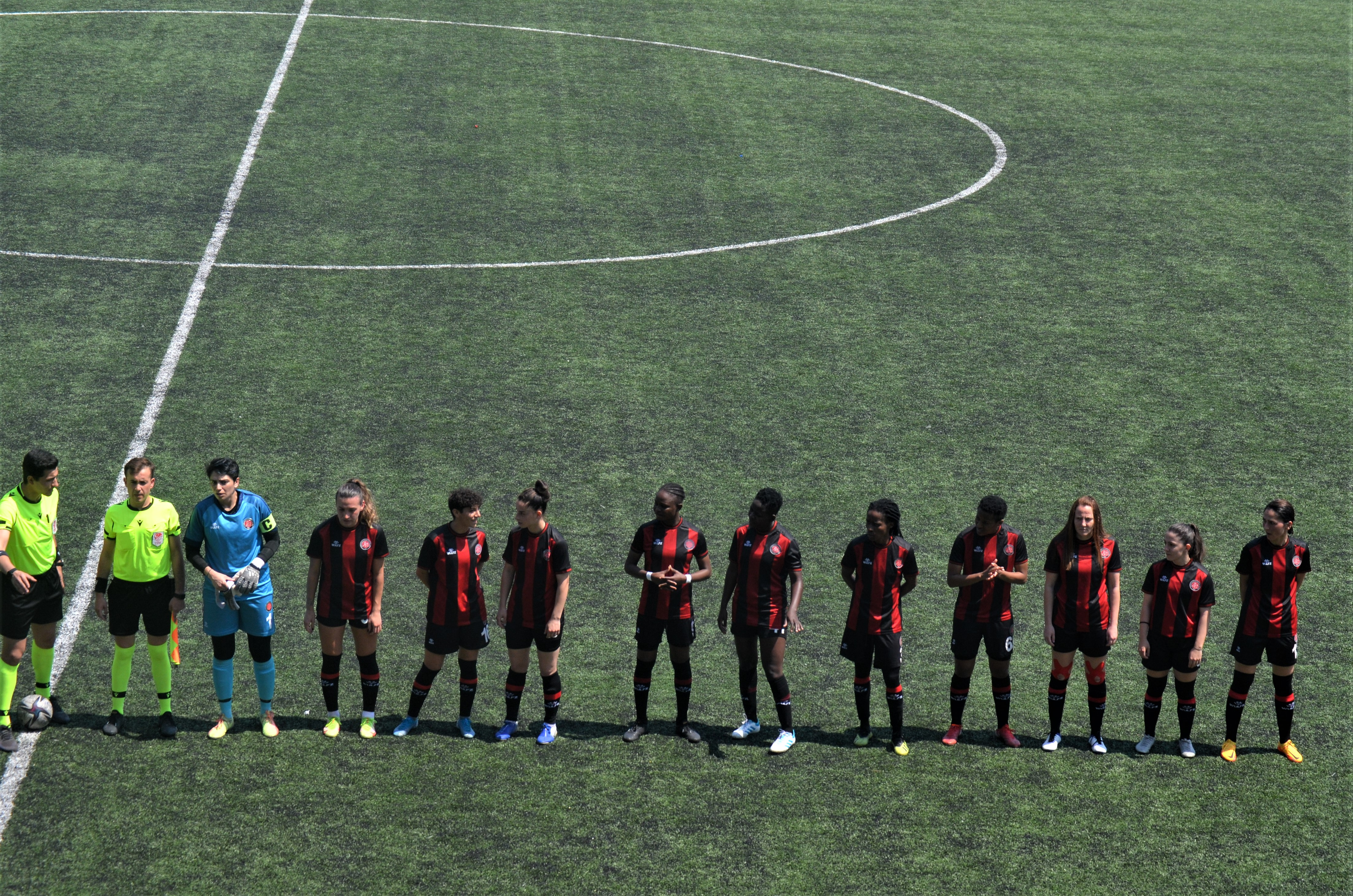
Fatih Karagümrük women's in the 2021-22 Super League play-offs
