= Tatiana Matveeva (footballer) =

Georgian footballer (born 1990)

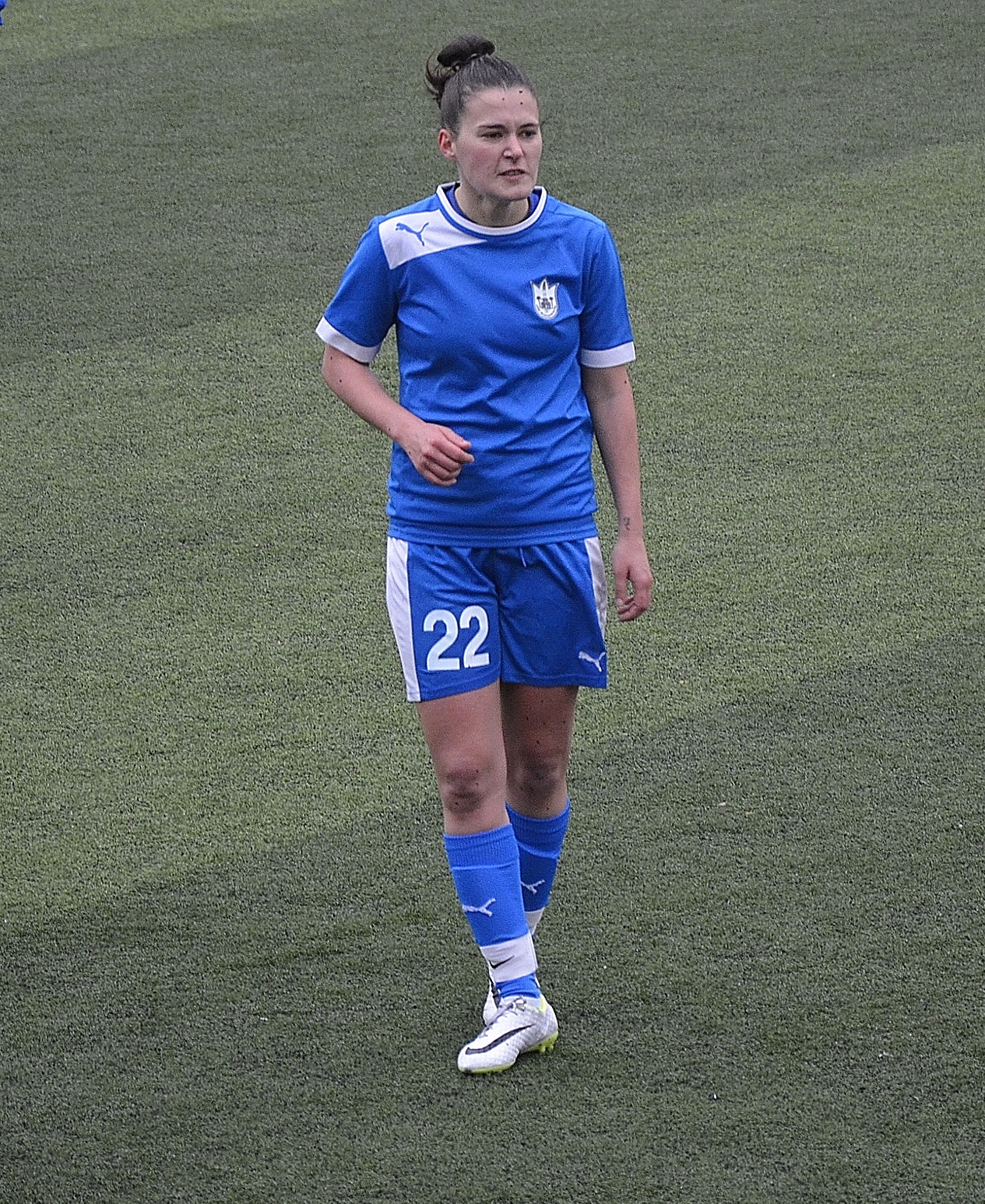
- Tatiana Matveeva in 2014

Personal information
- Date of birth: 25 July 1990 (age 36)
- Place of birth: Georgian SSR, Soviet Union
- Height: 1.71 m (5 ft 7 in)
- Positions: Attacking midfielder; forward

Team information
- Current team: Fatih Karagümrük
- Number: 7

Senior career*
Years	Team	Apps	(Gls)
- Iveria Khashuri
2008–2011	Trabzonspor	56	(51)
2011–2013	Ataşehir Belediyesi	44	(23)
2014–2015	Konak Belediyespor	24	(13)
2017	1207 Antalya Spor	3	(0)
2019–2020	Granadilla	13	(2)
2022–	Fatih Karagümrük	10	(5)

International career^{‡}
2006–	Georgia	6	(1)
- * Club domestic league appearances and goals as of 4 March 2023 ‡ National team caps and goals as of 28 August 2013

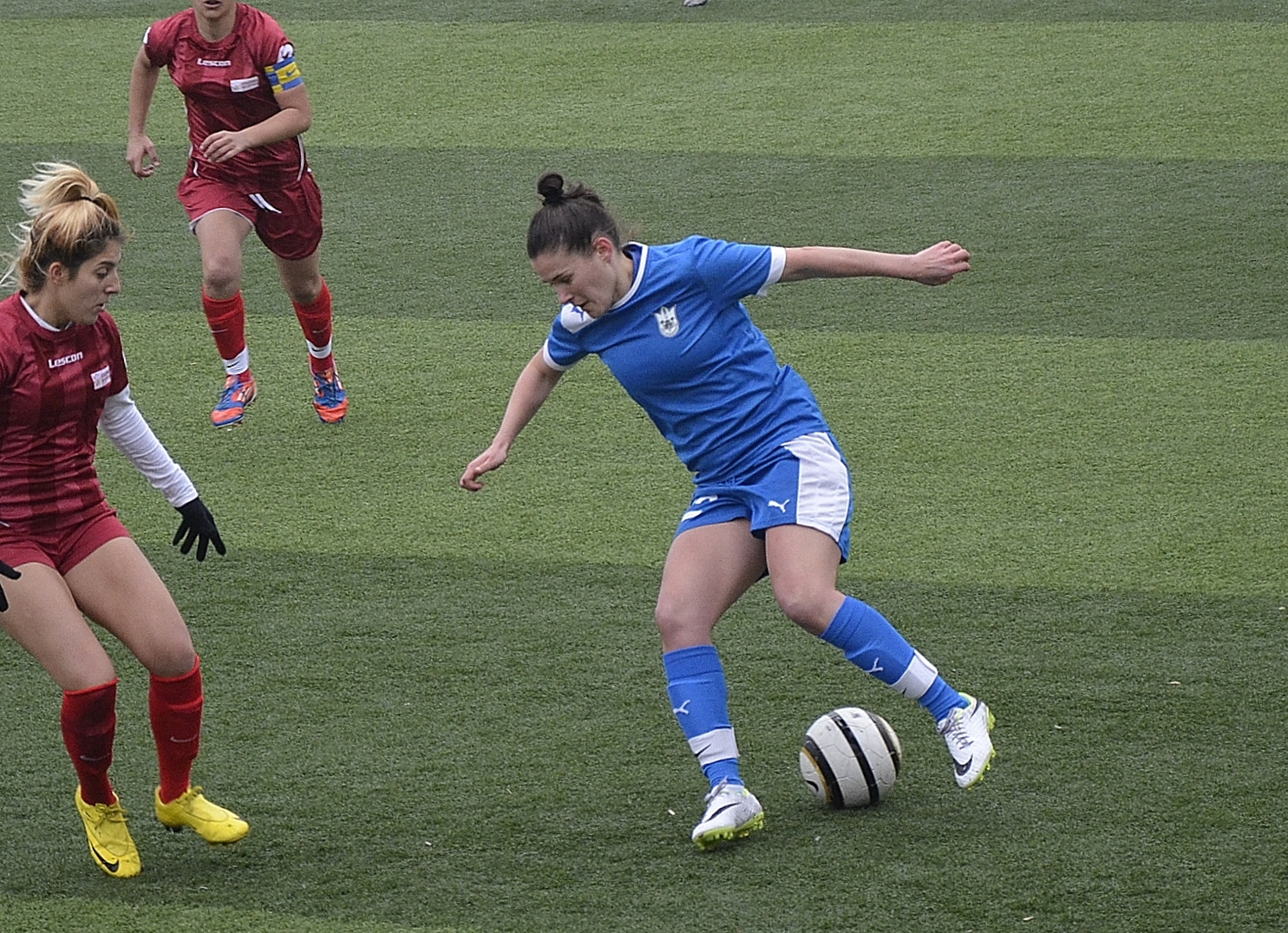
Tatiana Matveeva (right) in action for Konak Belediyespor in the 2013–14 season

Tatiana Matveeva, nicknamed Tata (Georgian: ტატიანა მატვეევა; born 25 July 1990), is a Georgian footballer, who plays as a forward. She played in the Turkish Super League for Fatih Karagümrük with jersey number 7. She is a member of the Georgian national team since 2006.

== Club career ==
She began her career in Iveria Khashuri before moving to Turkey to play for Trabzonspor. She took part at the 2009–10 UEFA Women's Champions League – Group D matches.

When the team folded in 2011, she moved to Ataşehir Belediyespor. Enjoyed her second championship at the end of the 2011–12 season, she played at the 2012–13 UEFA Women's Champions League – Group 1 matches until her team's elimination. She scored two goals in three games.

In the beginning of the 2013–14 season's second half, she was transferred by the İzmir-based Konak Belediyespor.

She joined the 1207 Antalya Döşemealtı Belediyespor in the nsecond half of the 2016–17 Turkish Women's First Football League season, at which she capped three times. In October 2022, she moved to Turkey again, and joined Fatih Karagümrük to play in the 2022–23 Super League season.

== International career ==
Tatiana Matveeva is a member of the Georgian national team. She played at the UEFA Women's Euro 2013 qualifying round's three matches as the captain of the national team. At the 2015 FIFA Women's World Cup qualification (UEFA) – Group 2 matches, she captained again, capping three times and scoring one goal.

== Career statistics ==
As of 4 March 2023

Club	Season	League			Continental		National		Total	
Club	Season	Division	Apps	Goals	Apps	Goals	Apps	Goals	Apps	Goals
Trabzonspor	2008–09	First League	14	4	–	–			14	4
Trabzonspor	2009–10	First League	17	28	3	0			20	28
Trabzonspor	2010–11	First League	22	19	–	–	3	0	25	19
Trabzonspor	Total		53	51	3	0	3	0	59	51
Ataşehir Belediyespor	2011–12	First League	20	9	–	–	0	0	20	9
Ataşehir Belediyespor	2012–13	First League	17	9	3	2	3	1	23	12
Ataşehir Belediyespor	2013–14	First League	4	3	–	–	0	0	4	3
Ataşehir Belediyespor	Total		41	21	3	2	3	1	47	24
Konak Belediyespor	2013–14	First League	9	2	–	–	0	0	9	2
Konak Belediyespor	2014–15	First League	15	11	–	–	0	0	15	11
Konak Belediyespor	Total		24	13	–	–	0	0	24	13
1207 Antalya Döşemealtı Belediyespor	2016–17	First League	3	0	–	–	0	0	3	0
1207 Antalya Döşemealtı Belediyespor	Total		3	0	–	–	0	0	3	0
fatih Karagümrük S.K.	2022–23	Super League	10	5	–	–	0	0	10	5
fatih Karagümrük S.K.	Total		10	5	–	–	0	0	10	5
Career total			131	90	6	2	6	1	143	93

== Honours ==
Turkish Women's First Football League

Trabzonspor (women)
Winners (1): 2008–09

Ataşehir Belediyespor
Winners (1): 2011–12
Runners-up (1): 2012–13

Konak Belediyespor
Winners (2): 2013–14, 2014–15
