= Marmara Üniversitesi Spor =

Marmara Üniveritesi Spor Women's Football
- Full name: Marmara Üniversitesi Spor Kulübü Derneği
- Founded: 2003; 23 years ago
- Ground: Anadoluhisarı Akademi Stadium
- Coordinates: 41°04′54″N 29°04′11″E
- Manager: Atakan Çağlayan
- League: Turkish Women's First Football League
Home colours

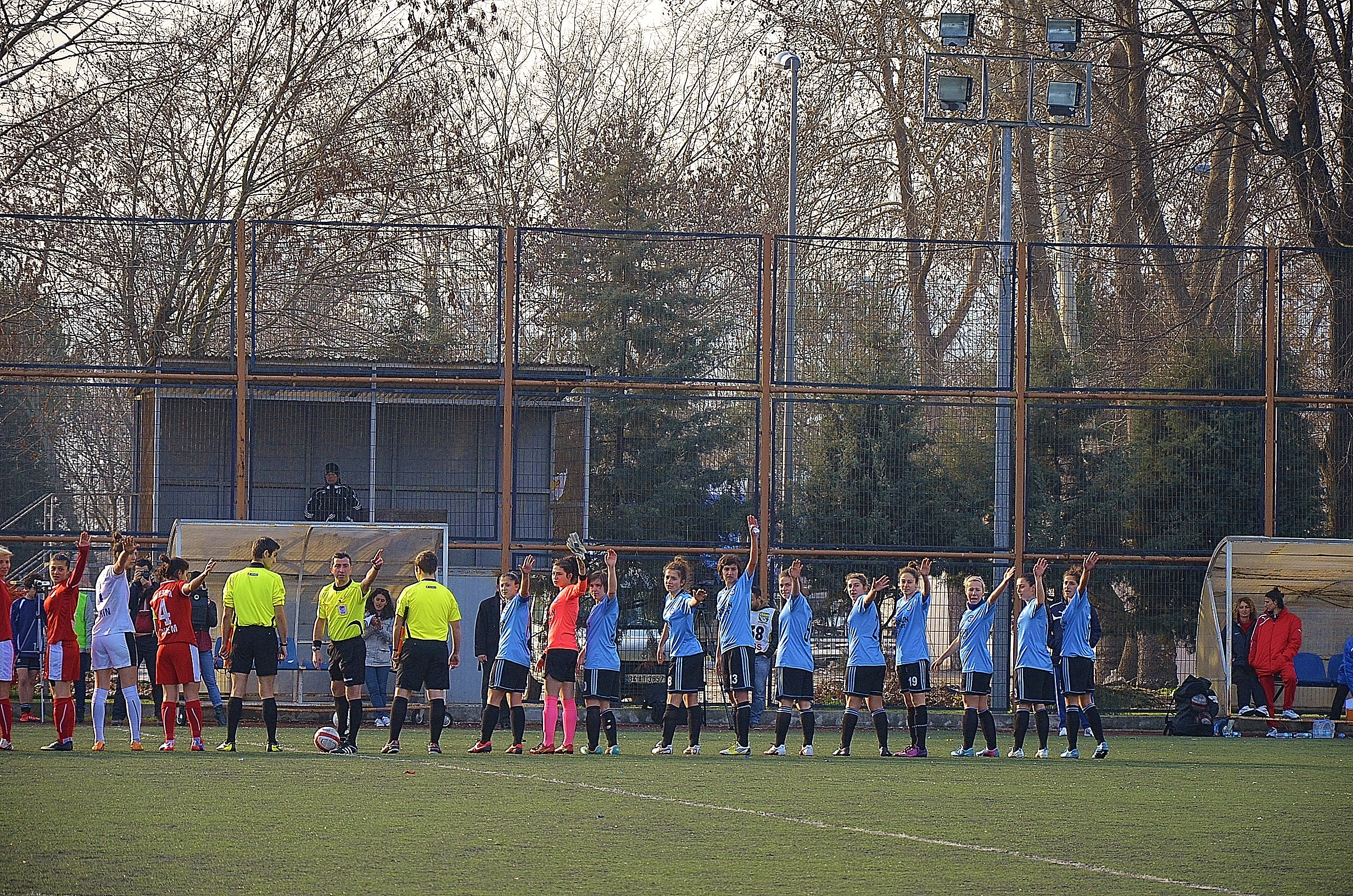
Marmara Üniversitesi Spor squad at a home match in the 2013–14 season.

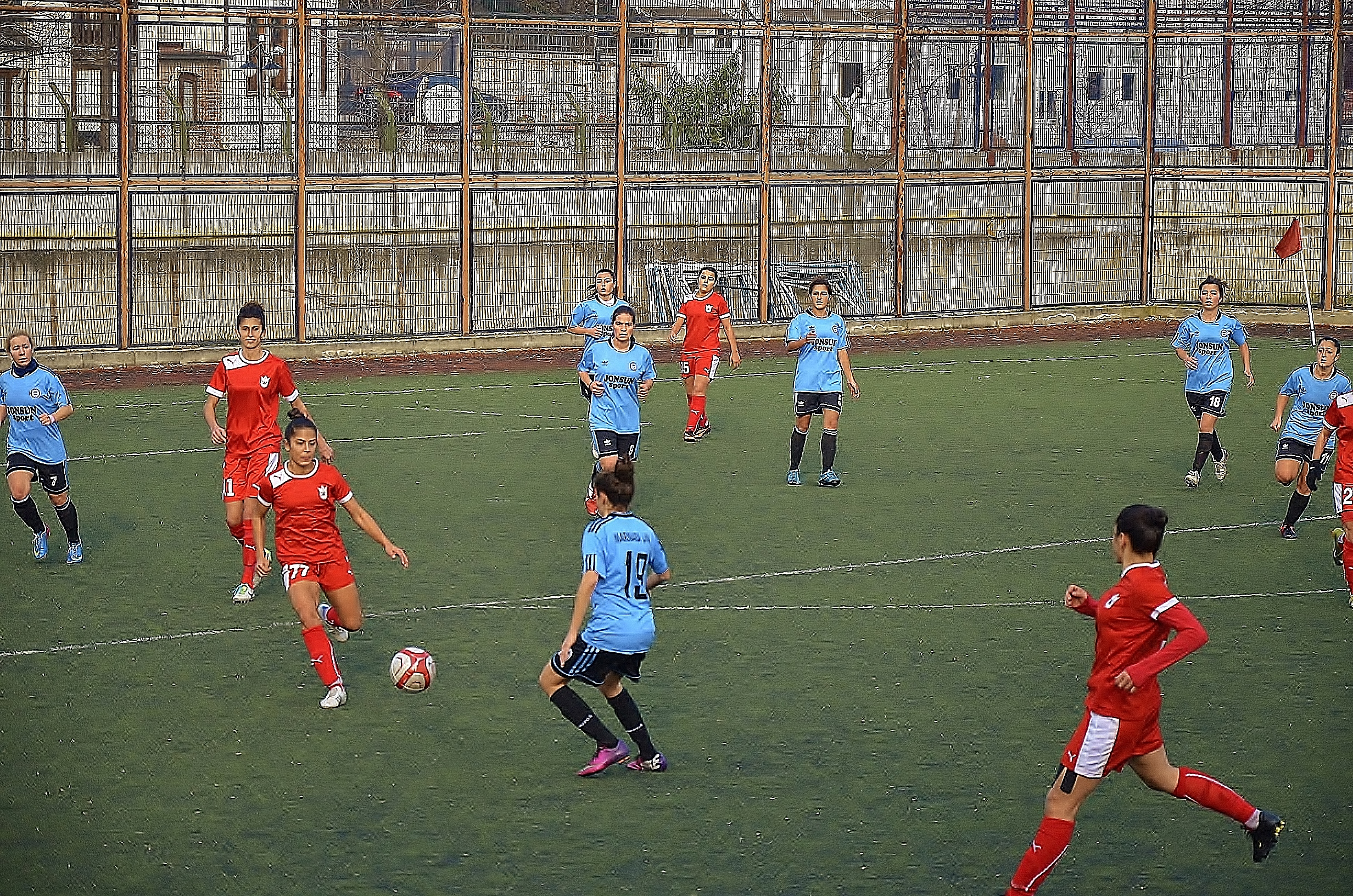
Marmara Üniversitesi Spor (in blue/black kit) at home match against Konak Belediyespor in the 2013–14 season.

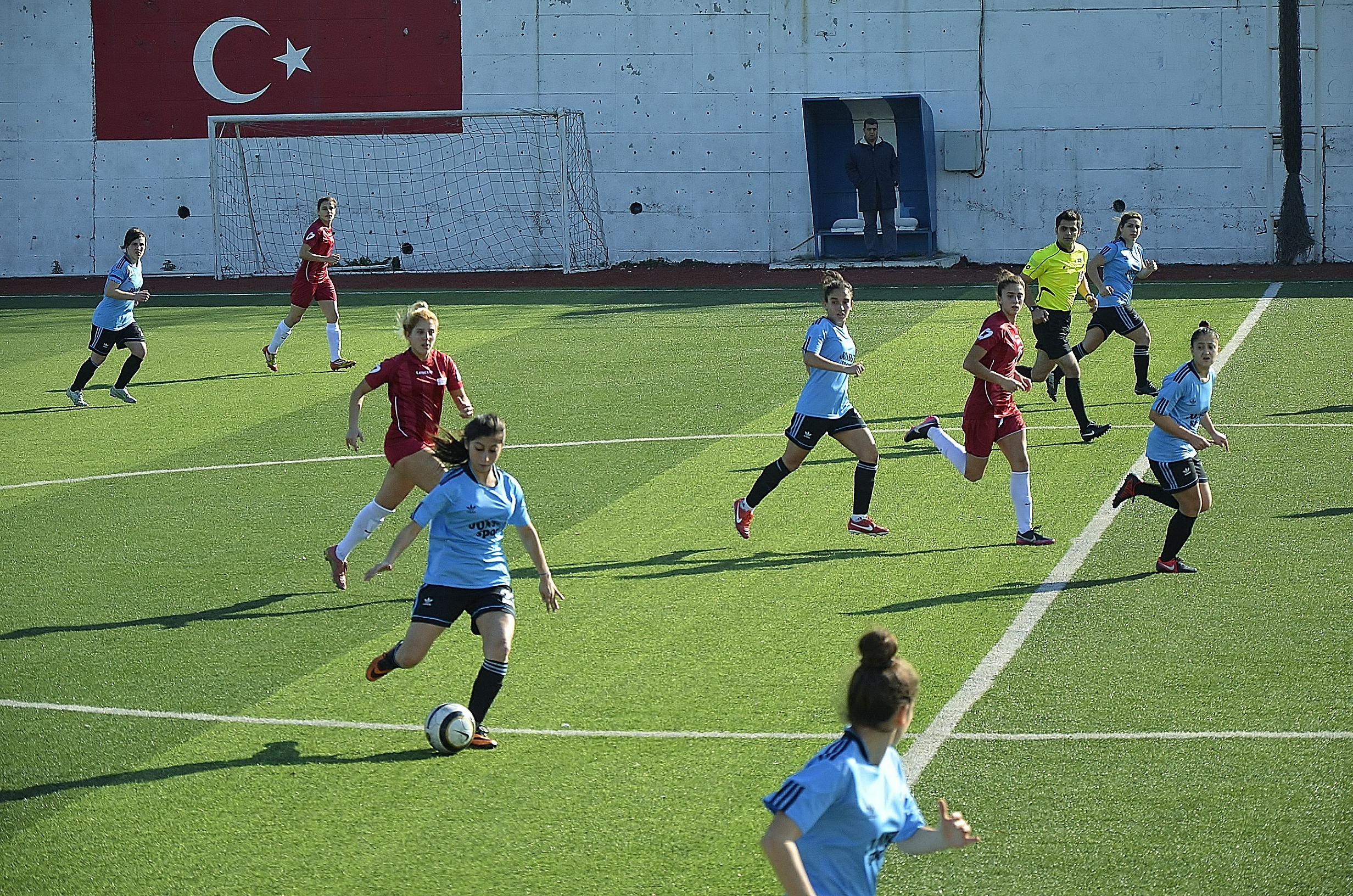
Marmara Üniversitesi Spor (in blue/black kit) at away match against Ataşehir Belediyespor in the 2013–14 season.

Marmara Üniveritesi Spor Women's Football (Turkish: Marmara Üniveritesi Spor Bayan Futbol Takımı) is a women's football team based in Istanbul playing in the Turkish Women's First Football League. It was established in 2003 as part of the multi-sport Marmara Üniversitesi Sports Club (Turkish: Marmara Üniversitesi Spor Kulübü Derneği) at the Physical Education and Sports College of Marmara University.

== History ==
Marmara Üniversitesi Spor advanced to the Women's First League after finishing the 2012–13 season runner-up in the Women's Second League Group 2.

Close to the end of the 2013–14 season, the Arbitration Board of the Turkish Football Federation imposed a penalty of three-point deduction on the team for failing to show at two matches in one period. It was ruled that the opponent teams win by 3–0 in forfeit against Marmara Üniversitesi Spor following that match date.

== Colors ==
The colors of Marmara Üniversitesi Spor are blue and black.

== Stadium ==
The team play their home matches at the Anadoluhisarı Akademi Stadium, which is situated inside the multi-sport facilities of the university at Anadoluhisarı neighborhood of Beykoz district . The venue's ground is covered by artificial turf.

== Statistics ==
As of 10 May 2014

Season	League	Pos.	Pld	W	D	L	GF	GA	GD	Pts
2006–07	Women's League – Gr. B	4	13	8	4	1	48	10	+38	28
2007–08	Women's League – Div. 2 Gr. B	2	8	5	1	2	34	18	+16	16
2008–09	Women's Second League – Gr. 1	1	6	4	0	2	17	9	+8	12
2009–10	Women's First League	8	18	3	1	14	17	74	−57	10
2010–11	Women's First League	11	21	2	5	14	17	81	−64	11
2011–12	Women's Second League – Gr. Marmara B	2	15	14	0	1	58	16	+42	42
2012–13	Women's Second League – Gr. 2	2	14	11	0	3	57	23	+34	33
2013–14	Women's First League	7	13	1	1	11	11	51	−40	1
Green marks a season followed by promotion, red a season followed by relegation.

== Current squad ==
As of 19 January 2014

Head coach: (Turkey) Atakan Çağlayan

Note: Flags indicate national team as defined under FIFA eligibility rules; some limited exceptions apply. Players may hold more than one non-FIFA nationality.

No.	Pos.	Nation	Player
1	GK	TUR	Müge İnan
2		TUR	Dilan Erkul
3		TUR	Hülya Ünlü
5		TUR	Esra Çelik
6		TUR	Perihan Yılmaz
7		TUR	Sinem Çakar
9		TUR	Seyhan Aycibin
11		TUR	Bürke Köksalan (Captain)
13		TUR	Tuğba Uzunay

No.	Pos.	Nation	Player
14		TUR	Ümmügül Sancak
15		TUR	Nuray Perçin
16		TUR	Burcu Turan
17		TUR	Buse Budak
18		TUR	Ayşe Sena Altınsoy
19	FW	TUR	Başak Gündoğdu
20		TUR	Özlem Şahintürk
23		TUR	Özlem Çoban
24	MF	TUR	Nazlıcan Parlak
