= Lepelstraat =

- Village
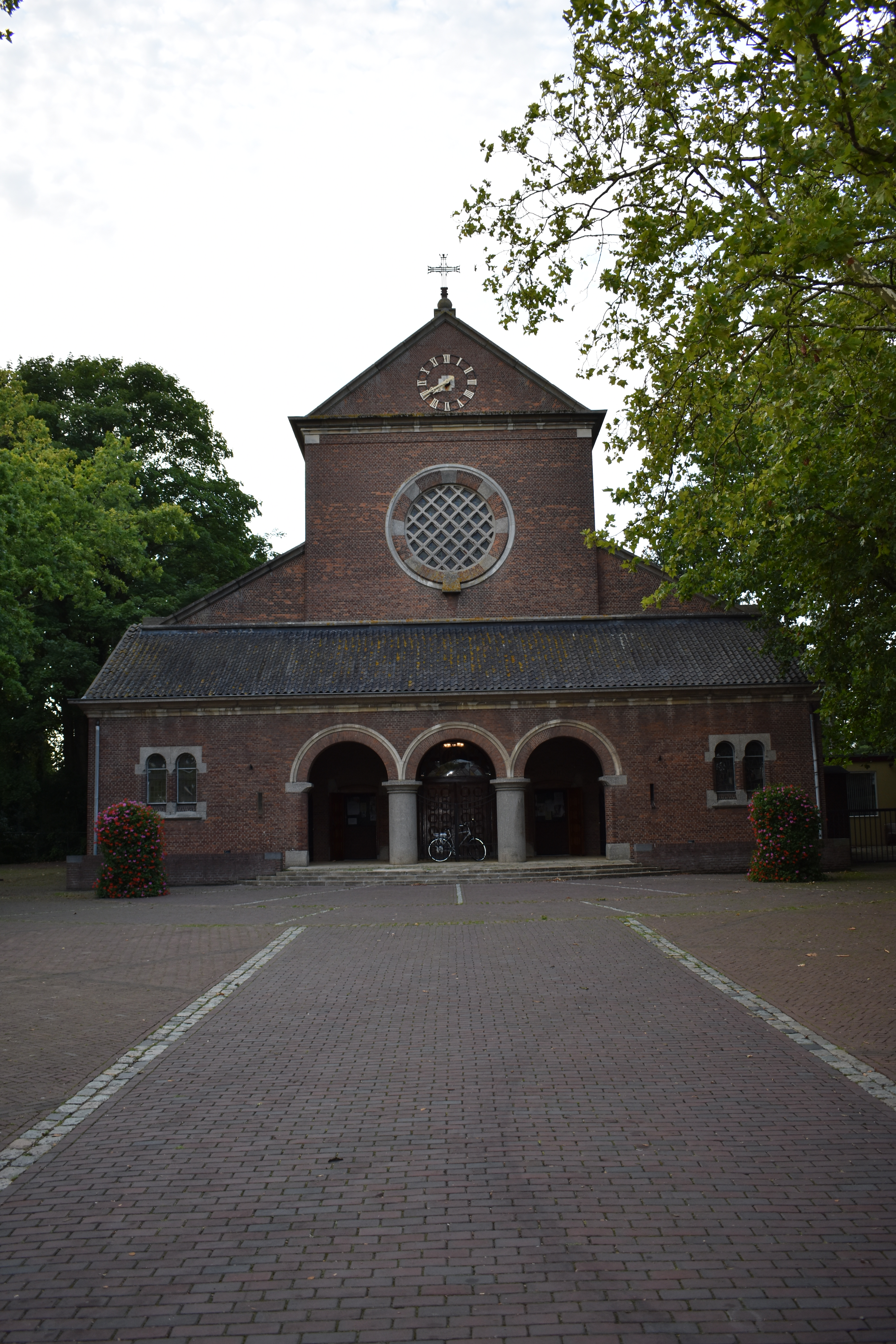
- St Anthony of Padua Church

- Location in the province of North Brabant in the Netherlands Lepelstraat (Netherlands)
- Coordinates: 51°33′N 4°17′E
- Country: Netherlands
- Province: North Brabant
- Municipality: Bergen op Zoom

Area
  - Total: 11.18 km^{2} (4.32 sq mi)
- Elevation: 4 m (13 ft)

Population (2021)
  - Total: 1,925
  - Density: 172.2/km^{2} (446.0/sq mi)
- Time zone: UTC+1 (CET)
  - Summer (DST): UTC+2 (CEST)
- Postal code: 4664
- Dialing code: 0164

Lepelstraat (Dutch pronunciation: [ˈleːpəlstraːt]) is a Dutch village six kilometres north of the city of Bergen op Zoom, and part of the municipality with that name. Its earliest records of history date back to 1298 where in a manuscript of landrights it was mentioned as "Den Leepel Straet."

Lepelstraat has always been important in its region's religious history. In 1612, a little church was created in the attic of a farmhouse that was kept from the knowledge of authorities because Roman Catholicism was forbidden at that time. Even though this situation changed later in the 17th century, it existed until 1875 when Lepelstraat got its first real church, with a tower having a height of 68 metres. This tower was blown up near the end of World War II by retreating German troops and has never been rebuilt.

During the Netherlands' "Great Flood" in 1953 most of the land around Lepelstraat became flooded, costing almost two thousand lives. The water did not reach Lepelstraat itself, making it a safe haven for refugees who lost their homes, friends, and families.
