= Nagihan Avanaş =

Turkish footballer (born 1997)

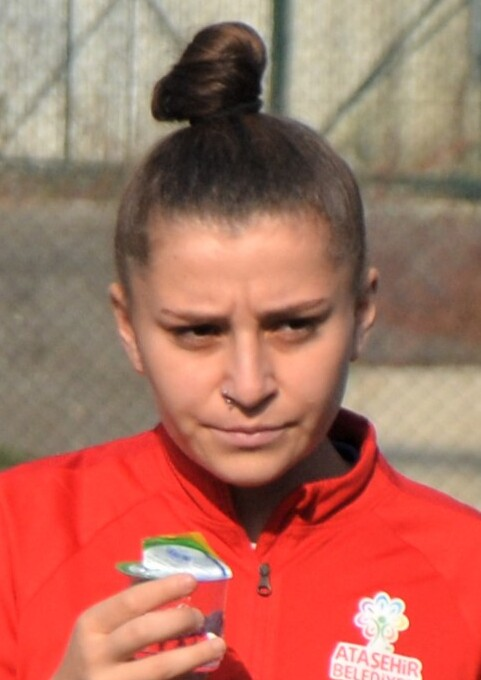
- Nagihan Avanaş (2019)

Personal information
- Date of birth: 23 May 1997 (age 29)
- Place of birth: Susuz, Kars Province, Turkey
- Position: Forward

Team information
- Current team: Fatih Karagümrğk S.K.
- Number: 21

Senior career*
Years	Team	Apps	(Gls)
2011–2013	Ovacık Gençlik ve Spor	17	(8)
2013–2017	Ataşehir Belediyespor	10	(0)
2017–2018	Kireçburnu Spor	21	(2)
2019–2021	Ataşehir Belediyespor	22	(1)
2021–	Fatih Karagümrğk S.K.	2	(0)

International career^{‡}
2012	Turkey U-17	1	(0)
- * Club domestic league appearances and goals as of 16 October 2022 ‡ National team caps and goals as of 19 April 2012

Nagihan Avanaş (born 23 May 1997) is a Turkish women's football forward, who plays in the Turkish Women's Football Super League for Fatih Karagümrğk S.K. in Istanbul with jersey number 21. She was member of the Turkey women's national U-17 team.

== Personal life ==
Nagihan Avanaş was born in Susuz district of Kars Province, Turkey on 23 May 1997.

Avanaş has spoken out about the difficulties that female Turkish footballers face, stating that they rarely get news coverage and many of them struggle financially. Outside of her football career, she is a physical education and sports teacher.

== Club career ==
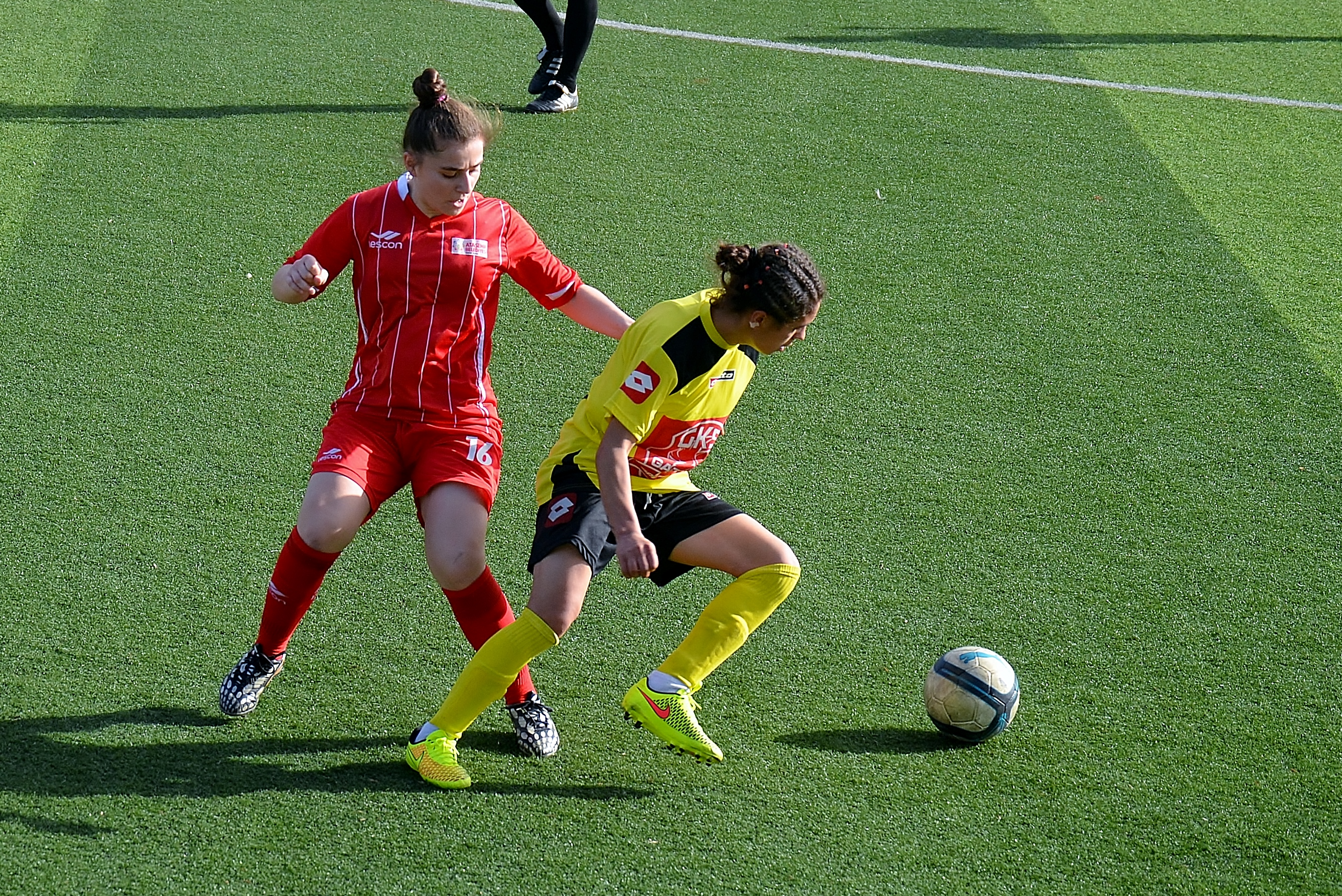
Nagihan Avanaş (left) for Ataşehir Belediyespor challenging an attack of Gazikentspor in the 2014–15 League season's home match.

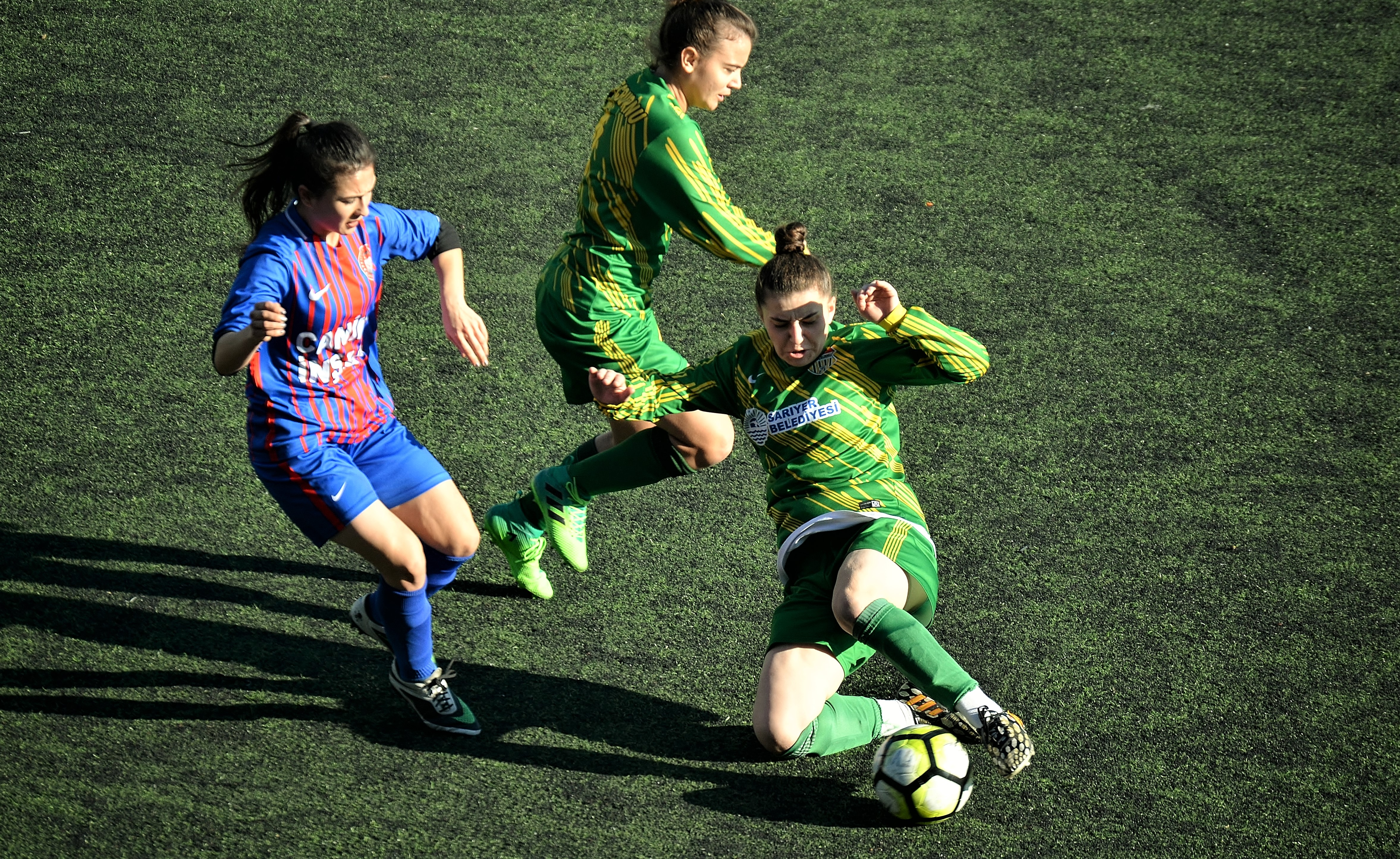
Nagihan Avanaş (right) playing for Kireçburnu Spor in the 2017–18 Women's First League match against Fatih Vatan Spor.

Nagihan Avanaş obtained her license for the Istanbul-based club Sosyal Hizmetler Gençlik ve Spor on 25 May 2011. After playing two seasons with Ovacık Gençlik ve Spor in Karabük, she transferred to Ataşehir Belediyespor in the 2013–14 season, where she still plays.

In 2014, she was part of the highschool team, which became champion at the ISF World Schools Futsal Championship held in Cagliari, Sardinia, Italy.

After staying away from the pitch in the 2016–17 season, she transferred to Kireçburnu Spor in October 2017. In the second half of the 2018*19 First League season, Avanaş returned to her former club Ataşehir Belediyespor.

In December 2021, Avanaş transferred to rge newly founded club Fatih Karagümrük S.K.

== International career ==
On19 April 2012 Avanaş debuted in the Turkey girls' U-17 team playing against Azerbaijan in the U17 Women's win UEFA Development Cup.

== Career statistics ==
As of match played 16 October 2022.

Club	Season	League			Continental		National		Total	
Club	Season	Division	Apps	Goals	Apps	Goals	Apps	Goals	Apps	Goals
Ovacık Gençlik ve Spor	2011–2012	Second League	7	2	–	–	0	0	7	2
Ovacık Gençlik ve Spor	2012–2013	Second League	10	6	–	–	0	0	10	6
Ovacık Gençlik ve Spor	Total		17	8	–	–	0	0	17	8
Ataşehir Belediyespor	2013–14	First League	3	0	–	–	1	0	3	0
Ataşehir Belediyespor	2014–15	First League	3	0	–	–	0	0	4	0
Ataşehir Belediyespor	2015–16	First League	4	0	–	–	0	0	4	0
Ataşehir Belediyespor	Total		10	0	–	–	1	0	11	0
Kireçburnu Spor	2017–18	First League	16	2	–	–	0	0	16	2
Kireçburnu Spor	2018–19	First League	5	0	–	–	0	0	15	0
Kireçburnu Spor	Total		21	2	–	–	0	0	21	2
Ataşehir Belediyespor	2018–19	First League	5	0	–	–	0	0	5	0
Ataşehir Belediyespor	2019–20	First League	13	1	–	–	0	0	13	1
Ataşehir Belediyespor	2020–21	Women's League	4	0	–	–	0	0	4	0
Ataşehir Belediyespor	Total		22	1	–	–	0	0	22	1
Fatih Karagümrük S.K.	2021–22 |	Super League	1	0	–	–	0	0	1	0
Fatih Karagümrük S.K.	2022–23	Super League	1	0	–	–	0	0	1	0
Fatih Karagümrük S.K.	Total		2	0	–	–	0	0	2	0
Career total			72	11	–	–	1	0	73	11

== Honours ==
- Turkish Women's Football Super League
  - Fatih Karagümrük S.K.
  - Runners-up (1): 2021-22
- Turkish Women's Football First League
  - Ataşehir Belediyespor
  - Runners-up (2): 2013–14, 2014–15
- ISF World Schools Futsal Championship
  - Mevlana Vocational Highschool for Girls team
  - Winners (1): 2014
